= Symmetry (album) =

Studio album by Saga
- Released: 12 March 2021
- Studio: Goodnight Nashville, Stan Portley's Cliffhanger Studio, Symphony Court Studios, Desolation Studios (Toronto), Dangling Carot Studio (Ontario), Sekret Studios (Missouri)
- Genre: Progressive rock
- Label: earMUSIC
- Producer: Jim Crichton (Note: No producer credit given, Crichton's role is called "project custodian")

Saga chronology
Sagacity (2014)	Symmetry (2021)

Symmetry is the twenty-second studio album by Canadian rock band Saga. It was released on March 12, 2021. It contains acoustic versions of previously released songs, some in the form of medleys or augmented with new interludes. The idea originated on the 40th anniversary tour in 2017, where the band would perform acoustically as their own support band "Pockets".

Initially, the band considered releasing a live album from this tour, but decided against it and settled for new studio recordings instead. The individual parts were recorded remotely during the COVID-19 pandemic, the arrangements were mostly worked out by Jim Crichton, who had retired from live performances in 2017. Several songs had already been played in similar versions on the aforementioned tour ("Time to Go", "The Perfectionist", "Images", "No Regrets" and the medley of songs from Trust). It was also on this tour when drummer Mike Thorne first used kitchen utensils for percussion sounds in the acoustic set. The piano interlude "La foret harmonieuse" includes a few lines from the song "Book of Lies".

The artwork has its roots in the 2017 tour, too, where a similar image (featuring a tree in the middle of a library, overlooked by the band's insect mascot) was used as a large backdrop for the acoustic section of the shows. According to Michael Sadler, the tree symbolizes the organic element of the album.

"Tired World" was released on streaming platforms on 4 December 2020, accompanied by an animated video clip. This was followed by "Wind Him Up" (again with an animated video) and "Always There". For the latter, the fans were asked to send in video material, which was then assembled into a video clip.

== Reception ==
Symmetry was met with surprise and praise from reviewers. Metal Hammer lauded the surprising arrangements and interesting medleys and pointed out the folksy vibe of many songs. The Prog Report notes that despite its acoustic nature, the album "crackles with energy, intensity and inventiveness", the medleys are described as "the real showstoppers" and passages likened to Gentle Giant. Michael Sadler's voice gets a special mention for its "ageless" quality. The review is summarized with "Most tracks are loyal enough to the originals to satisfy longtime fans, while also sparkling with fresh musical ideas."

Oliver Kube of the German Classic Rock gave the album 8 out of 10 points, lauding the fact that Saga completely re-invented their tunes for the album. The only criticism is the fact that the amount of actual new music is confined to the interludes.

Steven Reid of Sea of Tranquility (3 ½ stars of 5) was somewhat less impressed, liking that "no easy options [are] taken and no quick fixes accepted" but winding up with the statement "I’m left more impressed than I am involved with this release." John Aizlewood of LouderSound also gave the album 3 ½ stars, stating "[w]hat in lesser, less-thoughtful hands could have been an anaemic re-treading is now – acoustic or not – more intriguingly complex." A positive review was also published by the German website My Revelations, giving the album 10/15 points. Another German site, Metal.de, gave the album 8 out of 10 points, summarizing the album as "the better type of acoustic album" which has a "natural flow".

== Charts ==
The album went to #18 on the German iTunes Chart and achieved a top position of #11 on the official German Album Chart, which makes it the highest charting Saga album in Germany since 1985's Behaviour. (Previously, the best charting Saga album since the 1980s had been 2012's 20/20 with a top position of #13.) On the Swiss Albums Chart, it reached #20, the best chart showing of a Saga album since 1987's Wildest Dreams. In Denmark, it entered the physical album charts at #6 and the vinyl charts at #31.

== Track listing ==
No.	Title	Writer(s)	Original release (year)	Length
1.	"Pitchman"	Crichton, Crichton, Gilmour, Sadler, Negus	Heads or Tales (1983)	5:18
2.	"The Perfect Time to Feel Better: Time To Go / The Perfectionist / We Hope You’re Feeling Better"	J. Crichton, Sadler (a-c), I. Crichton, Gilmour, Negus (c)	Silent Knight (1981) / Saga (1978) / Generation 13 (1995)	8:17
3.	"Images (Chapter 1)"	J. Crichton, Sadler	Images at Twilight (1979)	4:56
4.	"Always There"	Crichton, Crichton, Gilmour, Sadler	House of Cards (2001)	4:08
5.	"Prelude # 1"	Ian Crichton	2021	0:49
6.	"Say Goodbye to Hollywood"	Crichton, Crichton, Gilmour, Sadler, Negus	Steel Umbrellas (1994)	5:04
7.	"Prelude # 2"	Ian Crichton	2021	0:51
8.	"The Right Side of the Other Hall: Footsteps in the Hall / On the Other Side / You Were Right"	Crichton, Crichton, Gilmour, Sadler	Trust (2006)	5:48
9.	"La Forêt harmonieuse"	Jim Gilmour	2021	2:00
10.	"Wind Him Up"	Crichton, Crichton, Gilmour, Sadler, Negus	Worlds Apart (1981)	5:08
11.	"No Regrets (Chapter 5)"	Jim Crichton, Sadler	Worlds Apart (1981)	3:46
12.	"Tired World (Chapter 6)"	Crichton, Crichton, Sadler, Rochon], Negus	Saga (1978)	6:24

== Personnel ==
- Michael Sadler – lead vocals
- Ian Crichton – guitars, mandolin, banjo
- Jim Gilmour – clarinet, accordion, piano, backing vocals, lead vocals on "Say Goodbye to Hollywood" and "No Regrets"
- Jim Crichton – bass, project custodian
- Mike Thorne – drums (kick drum, snare drum, kitchen percussion), backing vocals
- Shane Cook – fiddle
- Stefany Seki – cello
- Beth Silver – cello
- Seren Sadler – backing vocals

== Charts ==
Chart (2021)	Peak position
Belgian Albums (Ultratop Wallonia)	157
German Albums (Offizielle Top 100)	11
Swiss Albums (Schweizer Hitparade)	20
UK Independent Albums (OCC)	39
UK Rock & Metal Albums (OCC)	13
