= Network (album) =

Studio album by Saga
- Released: November 30, 2004
- Recorded: Sound Image Studios, Van Nuys, California, 2004
- Genre: Progressive rock; neo-prog
- Length: 49:44
- Label: SPV/Steamhammer; Inside Out Music
- Producer: Jim Crichton

Saga chronology
Marathon (2003)	Network (2004)	The Chapters Live (2005)

Professional ratings
Review scores
Source	Rating
Allmusic	(not rated)
ProgressiveWorld.net	4.5/5 stars

Network is the sixteenth studio album by Canadian rock band Saga, released in the fall of 2004. A two-disc version was released on November 8, 2005, comprising the original CD and a DVD containing a 5.1 mix of the original album. It is the only Saga album to feature drummer Christian Simpson, who had replaced original drummer Steve Negus.

== Concept ==
Network appears to be a partial concept album about television; the opening number is entitled "On the Air", and it features songs like "Keep It Reel" and "Live at Five", which make references to television programming. In addition, the cover artwork features a television set depicting five earlier Saga covers on the screen (the debut album prominently in the middle, Images at Twilight top left, Silent Knight bottom right, Full Circle bottom left and House of Cards top right). On the back cover, the song titles were prefaced with "Channel 1", "Channel 2", "Channel 3" and so on, recalling the Chapters series that had closed with the previous album, Marathon.

== Track listing ==
All music is composed by Saga.

No.	Title	Length
1.	"On the Air"	6:25
2.	"Keep It Reel"	4:18
3.	"I'm Back"	5:01
4.	"If I Were You"	3:48
5.	"Outside Looking In"	4:13
6.	"Don't Look Now"	5:05
7.	"Live at Five"	5:15
8.	"Back Where We Started"	4:16
9.	"Believe"	4:56
10.	"Don't Make a Sound"	6:18

== Credits ==
Saga

- Michael Sadler – vocals
- Jim Crichton – bass
- Ian Crichton – guitar
- Jim Gilmour – keyboards, vocals
- Christian Simpson – drums

Production

- Produced by Jim Crichton
- Engineered by Jim Crichton
- Mixed by Jim Crichton assisted by Michael Sadler
- Recorded and Mixed at Sound Image Studios, Van Nuys, California, US
- Additional recording done at:
  - Dangling Carrot Studios, Brantford, Ontario, Canada
  - Good Sheppard Studios, Toronto, Ontario, Canada
  - Canyon Studios, Malibu Canyon, California, US
- Mastered by Brian Foraker, Autumnwood Mastering, Nashville, Tennessee, US
- Cover Concept by Jim Crichton
- Cover Design by Penny Crichton for Imagestockaid

== Charts ==
Chart (2004)	Peak position
German Albums (Offizielle Top 100)	78
