= How Do I Look (album) =

Greatest hits album by Saga
- Released: 20 December 1996
- Genre: Progressive rock
- Label: Spectrum

Saga chronology
Generation 13 (1995)	How Do I Look (1996)	Pleasure & the Pain (1997)

How Do I Look is a compilation by the Canadian progressive rock band Saga. It was originally released in 1996 only to the German market by the budget label Spectrum. It only covers the albums up to 1989's The Beginner's Guide to Throwing Shapes and also doesn't include anything off the debut Saga, however another Spectrum compilation Wildest Dreams (not to be confused with the album of the same title) included all songs from that LP.

== Track listing ==
All songs written by Saga.

No.	Title	Length
1.	"How Do I Look"	4:33
2.	"Starting All Over"	4:01
3.	"Waiting in the Wings"	4:55
4.	"Take It or Leave It"	3:58
5.	"The Way of the World"	4:18
6.	"The Sound of Strangers"	4:07
7.	"Time to Go"	4:24
8.	"Wildest Dreams"	4:58
9.	"The Flyer"	3:42
10.	"(You've Got) Too Much to Lose (Chapter 7)"	4:41
11.	"See Them Smile"	3:25
12.	"On the Loose"	4:12
13.	"Amnesia"	3:29
14.	"Wind Him Up (Live)"	5:48
Total length:		60:31
