= Saga (album) =

Studio album by Saga
- Released: April 1978
- Recorded: 1977–1978
- Studios: Phase One Studios, Toronto, Canada
- Genres: Progressive rock; new wave
- Length: 46:01
- Label: Polydor
- Producer: Paul A. Gross

Saga chronology
Saga (1978)	Images at Twilight (1979)

Professional ratings
Review scores
Source	Rating
AllMusic	2/5 stars

Saga, the first studio album by the Canadian progressive rock band Saga, was originally released in April 1978. It is the band's only album to feature original keyboardist Peter Rochon.

== Live performances ==
True to the album's legendary status among fans, there are few Saga concerts without material from the debut. "Humble Stance" is a fan favourite and a mainstay of the band's setlists. The song features on all the band's official live releases. "How Long", "Tired World (Chapter Six)", "Perfectionist" and "Ice Nice" are also frequently played live.

- "How Long" appears on In Transit (1982), Detours (rec. 1997, rel. 1999) and Worlds Apart Revisited (rec. 2005, rel. 2007).
- "Tired World (Chapter Six)" is featured on The Chapters Live (rec. 2003, rel. 2005) and Spin It Again! Live in Munich (rec. 2012, rel. 2013).
- "Perfectionist" can be found on Detours (rec. 1997, rel. 1999), Contact - Live in Munich (rec. 2007, rel. 2009) and Spin It Again! Live in Munich (rec. 2012, rel. 2013).
- "Ice Nice" is on Detours (rec. 1997, rel. 1999), Worlds Apart Revisited (rec. 2005, rel. 2007) and Live in Hamburg (rec. 2015, rel. 2016).
- "Will It Be You? (Chapter Four)" is featured on The Chapters Live (rec. 2003, rel. 2005).
- "Give 'em the Money" appears on Worlds Apart Revisited (rec. 2005, rel. 2007).

All the songs from the album except "Climbing the Ladder", which has never been played live to date, are available in official live versions.

== Other information ==
"Humble Stance" is one of only a few songs on which Michael Sadler plays bass guitar, while Jim Crichton plays keyboards. As it is a regular part of the live setlist - unlike "It's Time" or "No Stranger", which also feature the same configuration - fans usually know the band is about to play "Humble Stance" as soon as Sadler assumes the bass guitar.

The album cover introduced the trademark alien insect, a figure that plays a prominent role in the "Chapters" storyline. The creature is sometimes called 'Golden Warrior', 'GoldenBoy' or 'Harold, the Locust'. While only the first three albums featured this creature on the cover, it was later revived for Full Circle (1999), an album that also revived the "Chapters" story. At that point the figure assumed the role of Saga's mascot and has since appeared on numerous releases. It can also be seen as a stage backdrop, as seen on the current DVD Spin It Again! Live in Munich (recorded in 2012 and released the following year). The image of the insect has changed over the years; the locust on the cover of the debut is noticeably different than that which appears on Images at Twilight (1979) and Silent Knight (1980). On Full Circle (1999) the locust sheds its old skin and it is this image that features on most following Saga releases.

== The Chapters ==
Two of the songs, "Will It Be You? (Chapter Four)", and "Tired World (Chapter Six)", were part of a series of eight (but later sixteen) songs that Saga included within their first four albums called "The Chapters". The songs told the story of a young Albert Einstein. These songs were later included on The Chapters Live (recorded in 2003 and released in 2005), though to date, there has been no official compilation of the chapters in their studio incarnation.

== Track listing ==
All credits adapted from the original release.

Side one
No.	Title	Lyrics	Music	Length
1.	"How Long"	Michael Sadler	Jim Crichton, Michael Sadler, Peter Rochon	4:01
2.	"Humble Stance"	J. Crichton	Ian Crichton, J. Crichton, Peter Rochon, Sadler	5:50
3.	"Climbing the Ladder"	M. Sadler	I. Crichton, J. Crichton, Rochon, Sadler	4:45
4.	"Will It Be You? (Chapter Four)"	J. Crichton	I. Crichton, J. Crichton, Steve Negus, Rochon, Sadler	7:13

Side two
No.	Title	Lyrics	Music	Length
5.	"Perfectionist"	J. Crichton	J. Crichton, Sadler	5:46
6.	"Give 'Em the Money"	J. Crichton	J. Crichton, Sadler	4:25
7.	"Ice Nice"	J. Crichton	J. Crichton	6:55
8.	"Tired World (Chapter Six)"	J. Crichton	I. Crichton, J. Crichton, Negus, Rochon, Sadler	7:06

== Personnel ==
Saga

- Michael Sadler – lead vocals, keyboards, Moog synthesizer
- Ian Crichton – all guitars
- Peter Rochon – lead keyboards, vocals, Moog synthesizer, keyboard programming and orchestration
- Jim Crichton – bass guitar, synth bass, bass pedals
- Steve Negus – drums, percussion, Moog drum

Production

- Paul Gross – producer
- Alan Thorne – engineer, mixing
- Zoran Busic – design, concept
- Rene Zamic – illustrations
- All songs published by Pocket Music/Cyborg Music, except "Ice Nice" published by Pocket Music.

== Charts ==
Chart (1982)	Peak position
Swedish Albums (Sverigetopplistan)	33
