= Images at Twilight =

Studio album by Saga
- Released: May 1979
- Recorded: 1979
- Studio: Phase One Studios, Toronto, Canada
- Genre: Progressive rock; new wave
- Length: 37:55
- Label: Polydor; Maze (1979 Canadian reissue)
- Producer: Paul A. Gross

Saga chronology
Saga (1978)	Images at Twilight (1979)	Silent Knight (1980)

Professional ratings
Review scores
Source	Rating
AllMusic	3/5 stars

Images at Twilight is the second studio album by the Canadian progressive rock band Saga and was originally released in May 1979. It introduces the vocoder keyboard as an important instrument in Saga's development. It is also the only album to feature keyboardist Gregg Chadd who had replaced original keyboardist Peter Rochon.

== Live performances ==
"You're Not Alone" remains a fixed part of Saga's live set, and is notable in part for the frequent audience participation during certain passages. Vocalist Michael Sadler typically divides the crowd by gender or section, and the different sections take turns singing "You're not, you're not, you're not alone." The song is featured on all the band's official live releases. A remake titled "You're Not Alone '97" (keeping only the chorus and instrumental parts) was included on the album Pleasure & the Pain. "Mouse in a Maze" returned to the setlist in 2012, appearing on Spin It Again! Live in Munich, and the Special Edition of Sagacity (2014). Both performances omit the a cappella intro and start with the main guitar riff. It is also on the Limited Edition of All Areas - Live in Bonn 2002 (2004), along with "Images (Chapter One)".

"It's Time! (Chapter Three)" and "Images (Chapter One)" are featured on The Chapters Live (recorded in 2003 and released in 2005). "See Them Smile" can be found on All Areas - Live in Bonn 2002 (2004) and Worlds Apart Revisited (2007). "Take It or Leave it" is also on All Areas - Live in Bonn. "Hot to Cold" is available on Live in Hamburg (2016). From the album, only "Slow Motion" was never played live.

== The Chapters ==
Two of the songs, "Images (Chapter One)" and "It's Time (Chapter Three)" were part of a series of eight (but later sixteen) songs that Saga included within their first four albums called "The Chapters", which told the story of a young Albert Einstein. To date, there's been no official compilation of the chapters in their studio incarnation.

== Track listing ==
All credits adapted from the original release.

Side one
No.	Title	Lyrics	Music	Length
1.	"It's Time (Chapter Three)"	J. Crichton	Jim Crichton, Ian Crichton, Greg Chadd, Steve Negus, Michael Sadler	4:01
2.	"See Them Smile"	J. Crichton	J. Crichton	3:25
3.	"Slow Motion"	M. Sadler	Sadler, J. Crichton	3:55
4.	"You're Not Alone"	J. Crichton	J. Crichton, I. Crichton, Negus, Peter Rochon	5:22

Side two
No.	Title	Lyrics	Music	Length
5.	"Take It or Leave It"	Sadler	Sadler, J. Crichton	3:58
6.	"Images (Chapter One)"	J. Crichton	J. Crichton, Sadler	6:31
7.	"Hot to Cold"	Sadler	Sadler, Rochon	5:02
8.	"Mouse in a Maze"	J. Crichton	J. Crichton, Negus, Rochon	5:41

2002 Multimedia bonus track
No.	Title	Length
1.	"It's Time (Chapter Three)" (Live video)

== Personnel ==
Saga

- Michael Sadler – lead vocals, keyboards, Moog synthesizer, bass guitar on "It's Time!"
- Ian Crichton – electric and acoustic guitars
- Gregg Chadd – keyboards, backing vocals, Moog synthesizer, vocoder
- Jim Crichton – bass guitar, Moog Taurus bass synthesizer
- Steve Negus – drums, percussion

Production

- Paul Gross – producer
- Alan Thorne, Mick Walsh – recording engineers
- Mark Wright – re-mixing engineer
- Jeff Stobbs, Robin Brouwers – re-mixing engineer assistants
- Zoran Busic – album graphic concept and design
- Cover illustration by Tony Roberts, Young Artists, London, England
