= 10,000 Days (Saga album) =

Studio album by Saga
- Released: November 6, 2007
- Recorded: 2007
- Genre: Progressive rock
- Length: 51:00
- Label: InsideOut Music, SPV GmbH
- Producer: Saga

Saga chronology
Trust (2006)	10,000 Days (2007)	The Human Condition (2009)

Professional ratings
Review scores
Source	Rating
Allmusic	4/5 stars

10,000 Days is the eighteenth studio album by Canadian band Saga. It was recorded after Michael Sadler had explained that he would leave the band for family reasons. The title therefore alludes to the thirty years Sadler had been part of Saga (which equates roughly 10,000 days). Sadler left after the tour but would return to the fold four years later.

"Corkentellis" is the first full-band instrumental Saga ever recorded ("Conversations" had some lines sung through a vocoder, whereas "Voila!" and "Watching the Clock" were solo piano interludes by Jim Gilmour). The track's unusual title is an amalgam of the names of three former Saga managers - Clive Corcoran, Geoff Kent and Michael Ellis. Along with "Book of Lies", it has become a live favourite.

== Track listing ==
No.	Title	Length
1.	"Lifeline"	5:36
2.	"Book of Lies"	5:44
3.	"Sideways"	4:53
4.	"Can't You See Me Now?"	6:13
5.	"Corkentellis"	7:11
6.	"More Than I Deserve"	5:22
7.	"Sound Advice"	5:17
8.	"10,000 Days"	4:32
9.	"It Never Ends"	6:10

== Personnel ==
- Michael Sadler – vocals, keyboards
- Ian Crichton – guitars
- Jim Crichton – bass, keyboards
- Jim Gilmour – keyboards, vocals
- Brian Doerner – drums

== Production ==
- Recorded and Engineered by Saga
- Drums Recorded and Engineered by Mark Fortuna
- Mixed by Jim Crichton
- Mastered by Peter van't Riet
- Produced by Saga
- Illustrations by Warren Flanagan. Graphic Design by Patrick Zahorodniuk

== Charts ==
Chart (2007)	Peak position
German Albums (Offizielle Top 100)	78
