= You Know I Know =

You Know I Know may refer to:

- You Know I Know (band), a Canadian rock band formerly known as "Inward Eye"
- You Know I Know (album), a 2018 album by English musician Olly Murs
- "You Know, I Know", a song by John Lee Hooker from No Escape from the Blues: The Electric Lady Sessions
- "You Know I Know", song from the TV series The Little Mermaid
- "You Know I Know", song by Saga from their album Marathon
- "You Know I Know", song by the Saints from their album Howling
