= The Works (Saga album) =

Greatest hits album by Saga
- Released: 1991
- Genre: Progressive rock
- Label: Bon Aire Records

Saga chronology
The Beginner's Guide to Throwing Shapes (1989)	The Works (1991)	The Security of Illusion (1993)

The Works is a greatest hit compilation by the Canadian progressive rock band Saga. It was originally released in 1991 only to the German market, as a double CD and vinyl for Bon Aire Records.

It includes three new tracks - "Gotta Love It", "The Call" (both released as singles), and a cover of "Solsbury Hill."

All songs written by Saga except for "Solsbury Hill," which was written by Peter Gabriel.

== CD 1 ==
No.	Title	Length
1.	"Gotta Love It"	4:43
2.	"How Long"	3:59
3.	"What Do I Know?"	3:37
4.	"Only Time Will Tell"	4:22
5.	"Humble Stance"	5:47
6.	"Don't Be Late (Chapter Two)"	5:59
7.	"The Vendetta (Still Helpless)"	3:38
8.	"Times Up"	4:01
9.	"The Flyer"	3:42
10.	"Angel"	4:20
11.	"As I Am"	5:16
12.	"On the Loose"	4:09
13.	"Chase the Wind"	4:52
14.	"You and the Night"	5:15
Total length:		54:44

== CD 2 ==
No.	Title	Length
1.	"The Call"	4:19
2.	"Scratching the Surface"	5:13
3.	"Take a Chance"	3:52
4.	"Starting All Over"	4:00
5.	"Slow Motion"	3:50
6.	"Catwalk"	4:23
7.	"Once Upon a Time"	6:35
8.	"Solsbury Hill (Written By – Peter Gabriel)"	4:39
9.	"Out of the Shadows"	4:45
10.	"Careful Where You Step"	4:22
11.	"Wildest Dreams"	4:56
12.	"Help Me Out"	5:52
13.	"Wind Him Up"	5:54
14.	"A Brief Case"	2:14
Total length:		65:88

== LP 1 Side 1 ==
No.	Title	Length
1.	"Gotta Love It"	4:36
2.	"How Long"	3:58
3.	"What Do I Know?"	3:39
4.	"Only Time Will Tell"	4:22
5.	"Times Up"	4:08
6.	"Chase the Wind"	4:52
7.	"You and the Night"	5:17

== LP 1 Side 2 ==
No.	Title	Length
1.	"The Call"	4:15
2.	"Scratching the Surface"	5:26
3.	"Don't Be Late (Chapter Two)"	6:02
4.	"Humble Stance"	5:54
5.	"On the Loose"	4:12
6.	"As I Am"	5:15

== LP 2 Side 1 ==
No.	Title	Length
1.	"Solsbury Hill (Peter Gabriel)"	4:29
2.	"The Vendetta (Still Helpless)"	3:55
3.	"(Goodbye) Once Upon a Time"	6:35
4.	"Catwalk"	4:24
5.	"Slow Motion"	3:25
6.	"Angel"	4:20
7.	"Take a Chance"	3:52

== LP 2 Side 2 ==
No.	Title	Length
1.	"The Flyer"	3:37
2.	"Help Me Out"	5:50
3.	"Starting All Over"	4:01
4.	"Out of the Shadows"	4:46
5.	"Careful Where You Step"	4:18
6.	"Wind Him Up"	5:48
7.	"A Brief Case"	2:19

== Credits ==
- Michael Sadler – lead vocals
- Ian Crichton – guitars
- Jim Gilmour – keyboards, backing vocals
- Jim Crichton – bass, keyboards
- Steve Negus – drums, percussion, Moog synthesizer
- Curt Cress - percussion, drums
- Peter Rochon - keyboards
- Gregg Chadd - keyboards

== Charts ==
Chart (1991)	Peak position
German Albums (Offizielle Top 100)	18
