= The Chapters Live =

Live album by Saga
- Released: 8 November 2005
- Recorded: 2003
- Genre: Rock
- Length: 80:40
- Label: InsideOut Music
- Producer: Jim Crichton

Saga chronology
| Network (2004) | The Chapters Live (2005) | Trust (2006) |

Professional ratings
Review scores
| Source | Rating |
|---|---|
| AllMusic | 4/5 stars |

The Chapters Live is a live album by Canadian progressive rock band Saga that was recorded in 2003, released in 2005. It is the last live recording to feature drummer Steve Negus.

== Details ==
The album compiles all 16 "Chapter" songs in live format in its correct order, which were originally released over eight studio albums starting in 1978 and concluding in 2003. The studio versions were released over a 25-year period in a mixed-up order to create a conceptual puzzle.

== Concept ==
The story was inspired by the Cold War, and the preservation of Albert Einstein's brain, which was kept by Thomas S. Harvey, M.D. There are also science fiction themes, such as aliens being concerned with humanity's self-destruction, and the resurrection of the dead through technology.

== Track listing ==
Disc One
| No. | Title | Writer(s) | Originally From | Length |
|---|---|---|---|---|
| 1. | "Images (Chapter 1)" | J. Crichton, M. Sadler | Images at Twilight, 1979 | 5:03 |
| 2. | "Don't Be Late (Chapter 2)" | I. Crichton, J. Crichton, M. Sadler | Silent Knight, 1980 | 6:27 |
| 3. | "It's Time (Chapter 3)" | J. Crichton, I. Crichton, G. Chadd, S. Negus, M. Sadler | Images at Twilight, 1979 | 4:09 |
| 4. | "Will It Be You? (Chapter 4)" | I. Crichton, J. Crichton, S. Negus, P. Rochon, M. Sadler | Saga, 1978 | 6:27 |
| 5. | "No Regrets (Chapter 5)" | I. Crichton, J. Crichton, J. Gilmour, S. Negus, M. Sadler | Worlds Apart, 1981 | 3:48 |
| 6. | "Tired World (Chapter 6)" | I. Crichton, J. Crichton, S. Negus, P. Rochon, M. Sadler | Saga, 1978 | 6:36 |
| 7. | "Too Much to Lose (Chapter 7)" | J. Crichton, J. Gilmour, M. Sadler | Silent Knight, 1980 | 3:18 |
| 8. | "No Stranger (Chapter 8)" | J. Crichton, M. Sadler | Worlds Apart, 1981 | 6:23 |
| Total length: | | | | 42:11 |

Disc Two
| No. | Title | Writer(s) | Originally From | Length |
|---|---|---|---|---|
| 1. | "Remember When? (Chapter 9)" | I. Crichton, J. Crichton, J. Gilmour, S. Negus, M. Sadler | Full Circle, 1999 | 5:24 |
| 2. | "Not This Way (Chapter 10)" | I. Crichton, J. Crichton, J. Gilmour, S. Negus, M. Sadler | Full Circle, 1999 | 2:57 |
| 3. | "Ashes to Ashes (Chapter 11)" | I. Crichton, J. Crichton, J. Gilmour, S. Negus, M. Sadler | House of Cards, 2001 | 4:37 |
| 4. | "You Know I Know (Chapter 12)" | I. Crichton, J. Crichton, J. Gilmour, S. Negus, M. Sadler | Marathon, 2003 | 4:01 |
| 5. | "Uncle Albert's Eyes (Chapter 13)" | I. Crichton, J. Crichton, J. Gilmour, S. Negus, M. Sadler | Full Circle, 1999 | 4:55 |
| 6. | "Streets of Gold (Chapter 14)" | I. Crichton, J. Crichton, J. Gilmour, S. Negus, M. Sadler | Marathon, 2003 | 4:11 |
| 7. | "We'll Meet Again (Chapter 15)" | I. Crichton, J. Crichton, J. Gilmour, S. Negus, M. Sadler | House of Cards, 2001 | 5:40 |
| 8. | "Worlds Apart (Chapter 16)" | I. Crichton, J. Crichton, J. Gilmour, S. Negus, M. Sadler | Marathon, 2003 | 6:44 |
| Total length: | | | | 38:29 |

== Personnel ==
- Michael Sadler – lead vocals, except on "No Regrets (Chapter 5)" and "Not This Way (Chapter 10)", keyboards
- Ian Crichton – guitars
- Jim Gilmour – keyboards, clarinet (on Disc one title 5), backing and lead vocals on "No Regrets (Chapter 5)", "Not This Way (Chapter 10)" and first and last part of "Worlds Apart (Chapter 16)".
- Jim Crichton – bass, bass keyboards
- Steve Negus – drums
