= Detours (Saga album) =

Live album by Saga
- Released: 1999
- Recorded: 1997 European Tour
- Genre: Rock
- Length: 113:14
- Label: SPV/Steamhammer
- Producer: Jim Crichton

Saga chronology
Phase 1 (1997)	Detours (1999)	Full Circle (1999)

Detours is a live album by Canadian progressive rock band Saga. It was recorded during their European Tour in 1997.

== Track listing ==
Disc 1
No.	Title	Length
1.	"In the Hall of the Mountain King William" (Instrumental)	2:46
2.	"How Long"	4:46
3.	"The Perfectionist"	5:51
4.	"Careful Where You Step"	4:32
5.	"Ice Nice"	5:57
6.	"Don't Be Late (Chapter Two)"	7:13
7.	"The Interview"	3:38
8.	"Wind Him Up"	5:46
9.	"Welcome to the Zoo"	4:18
10.	"Take a Chance"	4:34
11.	"William's Walkabout"	2:39
12.	"The Cross"	4:12
Total length:		56:12

Disc 2
No.	Title	Length
1.	"Scratching the Surface"	5:26
2.	"On the Loose"	4:55
3.	"The Security of Illusion"	5:00
4.	"I Walk With You"	3:10
5.	"Time's Up"	2:11
6.	"Heaven Can Wait"	5:55
7.	"The Flyer"	4:54
8.	"You're Not Alone"	7:43
9.	"Framed"	5:46
10.	"Humble Stance"	12:02
Total length:		57:02

== Notes ==
- The first disc of the original release contains a live video of "The Pitchman"
- The second disc of the original release contains a live video of "Intermission"
- "You're Not Alone" is a combination of the remake (from Pleasure & the Pain) and the original version
- "Humble Stance" ends after 7:20, it's followed by about 90 seconds of silence and then Steve Negus' drum solo plays as a hidden track

== Personnel ==
- Ian Crichton – guitars
- Jim Crichton – bass, keyboards
- Jim Gilmour – keyboards, vocals
- Steve Negus – drums
- Michael Sadler – vocals, keyboards

== Production ==
- Produced by Jim Crichton
- Engineered by John Henning
- Mixed by John Henning, Assisted by Chris Morrison
- Mixed at Sound Image Studios, L.A.
- Concept and Front Cover Photo by Jim Crichton
- Cover and Photos by Penny Crichton for Picture This Productions, Inc.
