= In Transit (Saga album) =

Live album by Saga
- Released: August 1982
- Recorded: Copenhagen, Munich
- Genre: Rock
- Length: 43:54
- Labels: Steamhammer, Polydor, Maze Records (Canada)
- Producer: Jim Crichton

Saga chronology
Worlds Apart (1981)	In Transit (1982)	Heads or Tales (1983)

Professional ratings
Review scores
Source	Rating
Allmusic	4/5 stars

In Transit is a live album by Canadian progressive rock band Saga. The album was recorded at the Rudi-Sedlmayer-Halle in Munich on February 5, 1982, and at the Tivoli Concert Hall in Copenhagen on February 22, 23, and 24, 1982. The album went platinum in Canada, selling 100,000 copies and gold in Germany, selling 250,000 copies. The album reached #10 in Canada October 23rd and was #58 in the Canadian year end chart.

== Track listing ==
Side One
No.	Title	Writer(s)	Length
1.	"Careful Where You Step"	Jim Crichton, Michael Sadler	4:20
2.	"Don't Be Late (Chapter Two)"	J. Crichton, Sadler, Ian Crichton	6:52
3.	"Humble Stance"	J. Crichton, Sadler, Peter Rochon, I. Crichton	5:50
4.	"Wind Him Up"	J. Crichton, Sadler, I. Crichton, Jim Gilmour, Steve Negus	5:48

Side Two
No.	Title	Writer(s)	Length
5.	"How Long"	J. Crichton, Sadler, Rochon	3:52
6.	"No Regrets (Chapter Five)"	J. Crichton, Sadler	3:57
7.	"A Brief Case"	Sadler, Negus	2:19
8.	"You're Not Alone"	J. Crichton, I. Crichton, Negus, Rochon	5:31
9.	"On the Loose"	Sadler, J. Crichton, I. Crichton, Gilmour, Negus	5:25

== Notes ==
- At the end of the album, the toll of chiming bells at Copenhagen Town Hall can be heard
- The 2003 re-release contains a screensaver

== Personnel ==
- Michael Sadler - lead vocals, except on "No Regrets (Chapter Five)", keyboards, bass guitar, electronic drum pads on "A Brief Case"
- Ian Crichton - guitars
- Jim Crichton - bass guitar, keyboards
- Jim Gilmour - lead keyboards, backing and lead vocals on "No Regrets (Chapter Five)", clarinet
- Steve Negus - drums and electronic percussion

== Production ==
- Produced by Jim Crichton
- Sound Engineering - Gerd Rautenbach
- Assistant Mixing Engineering by Andi Charal
- Technician - Mike Kahsnitz, assisted by Detlef Wiederhoeft
- Mixed at Phase One and Manta Sound Studios, Toronto
- Engineering - Mark Wright, assisted by Robin Brouwer and Lenny DeRose (Phase One) and Ron Searles (Manta)
- Art Direction by Zoran Busic
- Cover design and graphics by Hugh Syme
- Photography by Deborah Samuel

== Charts ==
=== Weekly charts ===
Chart (1982)	Peak position
Canada Top Albums/CDs (RPM)	10
Dutch Albums (Album Top 100)	38
German Albums (Offizielle Top 100)	3
Norwegian Albums (VG-lista)	13
Swedish Albums (Sverigetopplistan)	27

=== Year-end charts ===
Chart (1982)	Position
Canada Top Albums/CDs (RPM)	58
German Albums (Offizielle Top 100)	66

== Certifications and sales ==
Region	Certification	Certified units/sales
Canada (Music Canada)	Platinum	100,000^{^}
Germany (BVMI)	Gold	250,000^{^}
Yugoslavia	—	8,547
^{^} Shipments figures based on certification alone.
