= The Beginner's Guide to Throwing Shapes =

Studio album by Saga
- Released: December 1989; 2003 incl. bonus track 2015
- Recorded: 1989
- Studio: Picture This Studios; Pilot Studios
- Genre: Progressive rock
- Length: 44:34
- Label: SPV, Steamhammer, earMUSIC
- Producer: Saga

Saga chronology
Wildest Dreams (1987)	The Beginner's Guide to Throwing Shapes (1989)	The Works (1991)

The Beginner's Guide to Throwing Shapes is the eighth studio album by Saga, originally released in 1989. It is also the second album recorded by the band without longtime drummer Steve Negus and keyboardist Jim Gilmour, who temporarily left the band over management concerns.

== Track listing ==
All music is composed by Michael Sadler, Jim Crichton and Ian Crichton.

Side One
No.	Title	Length
1.	"How Do I Look?"	4:33
2.	"Starting All Over"	4:01
3.	"Shape"	5:10
4.	"Odd Man Out"	4:54
5.	"The Nineties"	4:16

Side Two
No.	Title	Length
6.	"Scarecrow"	4:20
7.	"As I Am"	5:15
8.	"Waiting in the Wings"	4:55
9.	"Giant"	7:10

2003 Bonus Track
No.	Title	Length
1.	"Framed" (Live)	5:46

2015 Bonus Tracks
No.	Title	Length
1.	"Wind Him Up" (Live)	5:46
2.	"The Flyer" (Live)	4:17

== Personnel ==
- Michael Sadler: Vocals & Keyboards
- Jim Crichton: Bass, Keyboards and Synthaxe
- Ian Crichton: Guitars, Synthaxe & Banjo
- Curt Cress: Drums and Percussion

Production

- Produced by Saga
- Jim Crichton – Recording Engineer
- Brian Foraker – Mixing Engineer
- Berthold Weindorf – Drum Recording Engineer
- Drums Recorded in Pilot Studio, Munich
- Album Recorded and Mixed at Picture This Studios
- Album Cover Design and Photographs – Penny Crichton
- Art Co-ordinator – Phillippe Grabowski
