= Allison Hossack =

Canadian actress

- Born: Steinbach, Manitoba, Canada
- Occupation: Actress
- Years active: 1989–present
- Spouse: Jamie Ollivier

Allison Hossack is a Canadian actress.

== Early years ==
Born in Steinbach, Manitoba, Canada, Hossack grew up in Killarney, Manitoba, and participated in musical theatre productions while a student there. She began her studies at Brandon University as a piano major but changed to a major in voice. Then she tried drama, and she later said, "By the time I graduated I was only interested in acting." She graduated from Brandon with a degree in music, after which she studied at Banff School of Fine Arts.

== Career ==
Following her collegiate studies, Hossack worked on stage at venues including the Muskoka Festival in Ontario and the Rainbow Stage in Winnipeg.

Her television roles include Another World from 1989 to 1992; Cobra from 1993 to 1994; Profit in 1996; Hope Island in 1999; and Stephen King's Kingdom Hospital in 2004. She starred in the Canadian TV series, Falcon Beach in 2006. Hossack has made guest appearances on television shows such as Sliders, Mysterious Ways, Da Vinci's Inquest, The Outer Limits, Eureka, Stargate SG-1, Stargate: Atlantis, and Fringe. She played Mrs. Oliver on the TV series Reaper. She also played Deanna Campbell, the mother of Mary Winchester and the maternal grandmother of Dean Winchester and Sam Winchester on the CW paranormal/horror series Supernatural.

== Personal life ==
Hossack married Jamie Ollivier, a writer and stand-up comic.

== Filmography ==
=== Movies ===
Year	Title	Role	IMDB Page	Notes
1991	White Light	Rachel Ruthledge	White Light	
1993	Night Owl	Jackie	Night Owl	
1995	Dangerous Intentions	Terri	Dangerous Intentions	
1997	The Hired Heart	Jenny	The Hired Heart	
1998	In the Doghouse	Jenna Wagner	In the Doghouse	
1999	Escape from Mars	Andrea Singer, Mission Chemist	Escape from Mars	
2001	Anthrax	Robin Anderson	Anthrax	
2005	Falcon Beach	Ginny Bradshaw	Falcon Beach	
2005	Ladies Night	Carole Ross	Ladies Night	
2005	Saving Milly		Saving Milly	
2006	A Little Thing Called Murder	Prosecutor Eleanor Hunt	A Little Thing Called Murder	
2006	A Job to Kill For	Andrea Tremmell	A Job to Kill For	
2007	Normal	Abby	Normal	
2008	The Quality of Life	Elaine Cushing	The Quality of Life	
2009	The Gambler, the Girl and the Gunslinger	Liz Calhoun	The Gambler, the Girl and the Gunslinger	
2010	Battle of the Bulbs	Mindy Wallace	Battle of the Bulbs	
2012	Duke	Dr. Angela	Duke	
2012	The Philadelphia Experiment	Lena	The Philadelphia Experiment	
2012	Christmas Miracle	Mary Wells	Christmas Miracle	
2014	Guidance	Ginny	Guidance	
2017	Sometimes the Good Kill	Mother Superior	Sometimes the Good Kill	
2019	Radio Silence	Daisy Reid	Radio Silence	
2019	A Very Country Wedding	Suzanne	A Very Country Wedding	
2019	Angel Falls: A Novel Holiday	Gloria	Angel Falls: A Novel Holiday	

=== Television shows ===
Year	Title	Role	Notes
1989–1992	Another World	Olivia Matthews	Recurring role
1993	Secret Service	Michelle	Episode: "The High Cost of Loving/Impostors"
1993	Forever Knight	Agnus Ferguson	Episode: "If Looks Could Kill"
1993–1994	Cobra	Danielle LaPointe	Main role (22 episodes)
1994	Lonesome Dove: The Series	Katie O'Malley	Episode: "Ballad of a Gunfighter"
1995	Sliders	Dr. Eileen Stanley	Episode: "Fever"
1995	The Outer Limits	Erin Whitley	Episode: "Dark Matters"
1996	Two	Sarah McCain / Sally Bragg	Episodes: "Pilot", "Reunion"
1996	Poltergeist: The Legacy	Constance Merrick	Episode: "Revelations"
1996–1997	Profit	Nora Gracen	Main role (8 episodes)
1997	Dead Man's Gun	Anna Butler	Episode: "The Healer"
1997	Viper	Rachel Caine	Episode: "Hidden Agenda"
1998	Psi Factor: Chronicles of the Paranormal	Jennifer	Episode: "The Kiss"
1998	F/X: The Series	Helen Fenick	Episode: "Vigilantes"
1998	Poltergeist: The Legacy	The Banshee	Episode: "Stolen Hearts"
1998	Fast Track		Episodes: "Kat's Cradle", "Change of Heart"
1999–2000	Hope Island	Molly Brewster	Main role (22 episodes)
2000	First Wave	Gwen	Episode: "The Believers"
2001	Mysterious Ways	Beth Montgomery	Episode: "Strike Two"
2001	The Chris Isaak Show	Helen	Episode: "The Real Me"
2001	Da Vinci's Inquest	Annie	Episode: "Ugly Quick"
2001	Night Visions	Carol Thorpe	Episode: "Now He's Coming Up the Stairs"
2002	Stargate SG-1	Zenna Valk	Episode: "Cure"
2002	Da Vinci's Inquest	Annie	Episode: "Run by the Monkeys"
2003	Da Vinci's Inquest	Annie	Episode: "Doing the Chicken Scratch"
2003	The Twilight Zone	Janet's Nurse	Episode: "Eye of the Beholder"
2004	Kingdom Hospital	Dr. Christine Draper	Main role (13 episodes)
2004	Stargate: Atlantis	Perna	Episode: "Poisoning the Well"
2004	Life As We Know It	Dr. Kornblum	Episode: "Pilot Junior"
2006	Saved	Paula Burton	Episode: "Family"
2006	Three Moons Over Milford	Evie Sissel	Episode: "Pilot"
2006–2007	Falcon Beach	Ginny Bradshaw	Main role (13 episodes)
2007	Masters of Science Fiction	Kelly Prosky	Episode: "A Clean Escape"
2007	Eureka	Dr. Emily Glenn	Episode: "E=MC...?"
2007–2008	Reaper	Mrs. Oliver	Recurring role (7 episodes)
2008	Robson Arms	Trixie Hoskins	Recurring role (6 episodes)
2008	Supernatural	Deanna Campbell	Episode: "In the Beginning"
2008	Heartland	Callie Phillips	Episode: "Dancing in the Dark"
2009	Heartland	Callie Phillips	Episode: "True Enough"
2010	Sanctuary	Lillian	Episode: "Animus"
2011	Endgame	Delia Chase	Episode: "Huxley, We Have a Problem"
2011	R.L. Stine's The Haunting Hour	Mom	Episodes: "Checking Out", "The Hole"
2012	Fringe	Bernadette	Episode: "A Better Human Being"
2012	The Killing	Sally Ames	Episodes: "Ogi Jun", "Openings"
2017	Good Witch	Elizabeth	
2017	The Expanse	Umea	Episodes: "Cascade", "Here There Be Dragons"
