= Cobra (American TV series) =

- Created by: Stephen J. Cannell; Craig W. Van Sickle; Steven Long Mitchell
- Starring: Michael Dudikoff; Allison Hossack; James Tolkan
- Country of origin: United States
- No. of seasons: 1
- No. of episodes: 22

Production
- Production companies: Gladstone Gate Productions; Cannell Entertainment

Original release
- Network: Syndicated
- Release: September 16, 1993 – May 13, 1994

Cobra is an American action/adventure television series starring Michael Dudikoff. It ran for one season in syndication from 1993 to 1994.

== Premise ==
Robert "Scandal" Jackson, Jr., is an ex–Navy SEAL who went A.W.O.L. after refusing to blow up an enemy command center housing civilians. He disappeared to the wilderness of Alaska, changing his name and appearance, and became a teacher in a small Inuit community. But a part of his past caught up to him and he was shot in the face, his comatose body left for dead. He awoke in the hospital three weeks later and found himself with a new face and a new chance at life, thanks to a woman named Danielle LaPoint.

Danielle offered him a job with "Cobra", an undercover anti-crime agency that provides justice for victims who haven't benefited from the system. Scandal is reluctant to leave his Alaskan life behind, but then Danielle's boss, Dallas Cassel, makes him an offer he can't refuse: the chance to catch the man who murdered his father five years earlier. From behind the wheel of his classic AC Cobra, Scandal dispenses justice in the fictional Bay City.

== Background ==
Starring Michael Dudikoff (the American Ninja series), Allison Hossack, and James Tolkan (the Back to the Future trilogy), Cobra was created by television producer Stephen J. Cannell, along with Steven Long Mitchell and Craig W. Van Sickle (both of whom later went on to create/executive produce The Pretender for NBC), and was filmed on location in Vancouver, British Columbia, Canada. Lee Goldberg & William Rabkin were the show's supervising producers and went on to executive produce Diagnosis: Murder and Martial Law, among other series. Matt Dearborn, an executive consultant on Cobra, produced several Disney Channel sitcoms, including Even Stevens. Bill Nuss, who executive produced Cobra along with Mitchell and Van Sickle, was also co-executive producing Renegade and Silk Stalkings simultaneously, and went on to work on The X-Files, NCIS and Hawaii Five-O.

Cobra was originally titled Viper. However, Chrysler Corp. sued Stephen J. Cannell for trademark infringement, and also because Chrysler was already working with CBS on a series called Viper that was to feature a brand new Dodge Viper concept car. (That show ultimately aired on NBC.) Since that other Viper series centered on a quasi modern-day Knight Rider, and Cannell's series centered on crime fighters named "Viper", Cannell believed the name could be changed without sacrificing the creative concept of the series, and so the title was changed to Cobra. Three episodes had already been filmed when the title change took place, so it appears Scandal would have still been driving the Cobra even with the show called Viper.

Canadian rock band Saga was hired to produce the main theme and several additional songs for the series, to be featured in specific episodes, but most were never used. Their 1994 album Steel Umbrellas contained most of these songs. There were lyrics written and performed for the Cobra theme, "Someone is Out There," but only the instrumental version was used in the series.

== Characters ==
Robert "Scandal" Jackson, Jr. (Michael Dudikoff): A martial artist, an expert marksman, an ex-Navy SEAL, and a former investigator for NSI, Scandal is perfectly suited to be Cobra's lead field operative. The only part of his past that remains is his vintage Cobra, which he helped his father restore when he was younger.

Danielle LaPoint (Allison Hossack): The daughter of Cobra's founder, Quentin Avery, Danielle is more or less Scandal's partner. Her mother was killed ten years earlier, and as a result she turned to helping victims like herself by working for Cobra. She holds a Ph.D in Psychology from Harvard University and was personally responsible for recruiting Scandal after arguing with her father that he was the perfect choice.

Dallas Cassel (James Tolkan): A former F.B.I. agent, Dallas is the director of Cobra. He almost got off on the wrong foot with Scandal when he faked Scandal's death in order to secure him an honorable discharge from the Navy, but Scandal ultimately realized it was for the best.

== Episodes ==
No.	Title	Directed by	Written by	Original release date	Prod. code
1	"Pilot (Part 1)" "Cobra (Part 1)"	Brad Turner	Stephen J. Cannell & Steven Long Mitchell & Craig W. Van Sickle	September 16, 1993	55101
2	"Pilot (Part 2)" "The Continuation of Cobra (Part 2)"	Brad Turner	Stephen J. Cannell & Steven Long Mitchell & Craig W. Van Sickle	September 23, 1993	55101
3	"Push It"	Brad Turner	Steven Long Mitchell & Craig W. Van Sickle	September 30, 1993	55108
4	"Honeymoon Hideaway"	Jorge Montesi	Stephen J. Cannell	October 7, 1993	55118
5	"Nowhere to Run"	Jeff Woolnough	William Rabkin & Lee Goldberg	October 14, 1993	55116
6	"The Gnome"	Jorge Montesi	Tom Szollosi	October 21, 1993	55106
7	"Mr. Chapman, I Presume"	Brad Turner	Steven Long Mitchell & Craig W. Van Sickle	October 28, 1993	55113
8	"Hostage Hearts"	Neill Fearnley	Matt Dearborn	November 4, 1993	55117
9	"I'd Die for You"	Neill Fearnley	Steven Long Mitchell & Craig W. Van Sickle	November 11, 1993	55107
10	"Something In The Air"	Brad Turner	Lee Goldberg & William Rabkin	November 18, 1993	55114
11	"Playing with Fire"	Lyndon Chubbuck	Steven Long Mitchell & Craig W. Van Sickle	November 25, 1993	55121
12	"Death on the Line"	Mario Azzopardi	Lee Goldberg & William Rabkin	January 6, 1994	55119
13	"Diamond in the Rough"	Mario Azzopardi	Lee Goldberg & William Rabkin	January 13, 1994	55123
14	"Lost in Cyberspace"	Lyndon Chubbuck	Story by : Michael Zand & Terri Treas; Teleplay by : Michael Zand	January 20, 1994	55120
15	"Blast from the Past"	Brad Turner	Morgan Gendel	January 27, 1994	55125
16	"Death Dive"	Brad Turner	Story by : Lee Goldberg & William Rabkin and Vivienne Radkoff; Teleplay by : Lee Goldberg & William Rabkin	February 3, 1994	55105
17	"Caged Fury"	Brenton Spencer	Story by : Lee Goldberg & William Rabkin and Bruce Cervi & John Lansing; Teleplay by : Lee Goldberg & William Rabkin	February 10, 1994	55112
18	"A Few Dead Men"	Brad Turner	John LeMasters	February 17, 1994	55126
Don S. Davis guest stars as Sergeant Thorne.
19	"Haunted Lives"	Jeff Woolnough	William Rabkin & Lee Goldberg	February 24, 1994	55110
20	"Lorinda"	Brad Turner	E.F. Wallengren	April 30, 1994	55124
Alice Ghostley guest stars as Lorinda McClure. Note: Scenes from Stingray episodes "Pilot" and "Gemini" were reused in the episode.
21	"Precious"	Brenton Spencer	Steven Long Mitchell & Craig W. Van Sickle	May 6, 1994	55122
22	"Aces and Eights"	Brad Turner	Bill Nuss	May 13, 1994	55104

== Home release ==
=== Canada ===
On February 13, 2007, Visual Entertainment released Cobra: The Complete Series on DVD in Canada. The 5-disc set also features several bonus features including episode summaries and a photo gallery.

=== United States ===
Mill Creek Entertainment released the complete series on DVD in the United States on September 29, 2009.

== See also ==
- T.H.E. Cat—a forerunner of the "expert(s) help(s) people in trouble" genre
