= Phase 1 (Saga album) =

Studio album by Saga
- Released: 22 April 1997, 2003 (incl. bonus track)
- Recorded: 1978
- Genre: Progressive rock
- Length: 53:37
- Label: SPV GmbH, Steamhammer Records

Saga chronology
| Pleasure & the Pain (1997) | Phase 1 (1997) | Detours (1998) |

Professional ratings
Review scores
| Source | Rating |
|---|---|
| AllMusic | 3.5/5 stars |

Phase 1 is a studio album by Saga, released in 1997.

Phase 1 was originally recorded in 1978. It is a fan only release that was made available through The Saga Club. It contains the demo versions of "You're Not Alone", "Mouse in a Maze" and "Hot to Cold". These versions are played live and are not re-mixed or dubbed. It also contains 5 new previously unreleased songs.

== Track listing ==
| No. | Title | Length |
|---|---|---|
| 1. | "Half the Time" | 7:06 |
| 2. | "Old Man" | 4:30 |
| 3. | "Hangman" | 7:49 |
| 4. | "You're Not Alone" | 5:37 |
| 5. | "Mouse in a Maze" | 5:45 |
| 6. | "Don't Bother" | 4:04 |
| 7. | "Hot to Cold" | 5:42 |
| 8. | "Don't Step Out of Line" | 5:17 |

2003 Bonus Track
| No. | Title | Length |
|---|---|---|
| 1. | "You're Not Alone" (Live) | 7:45 |
