= Saga (band) =

Canadian rock band

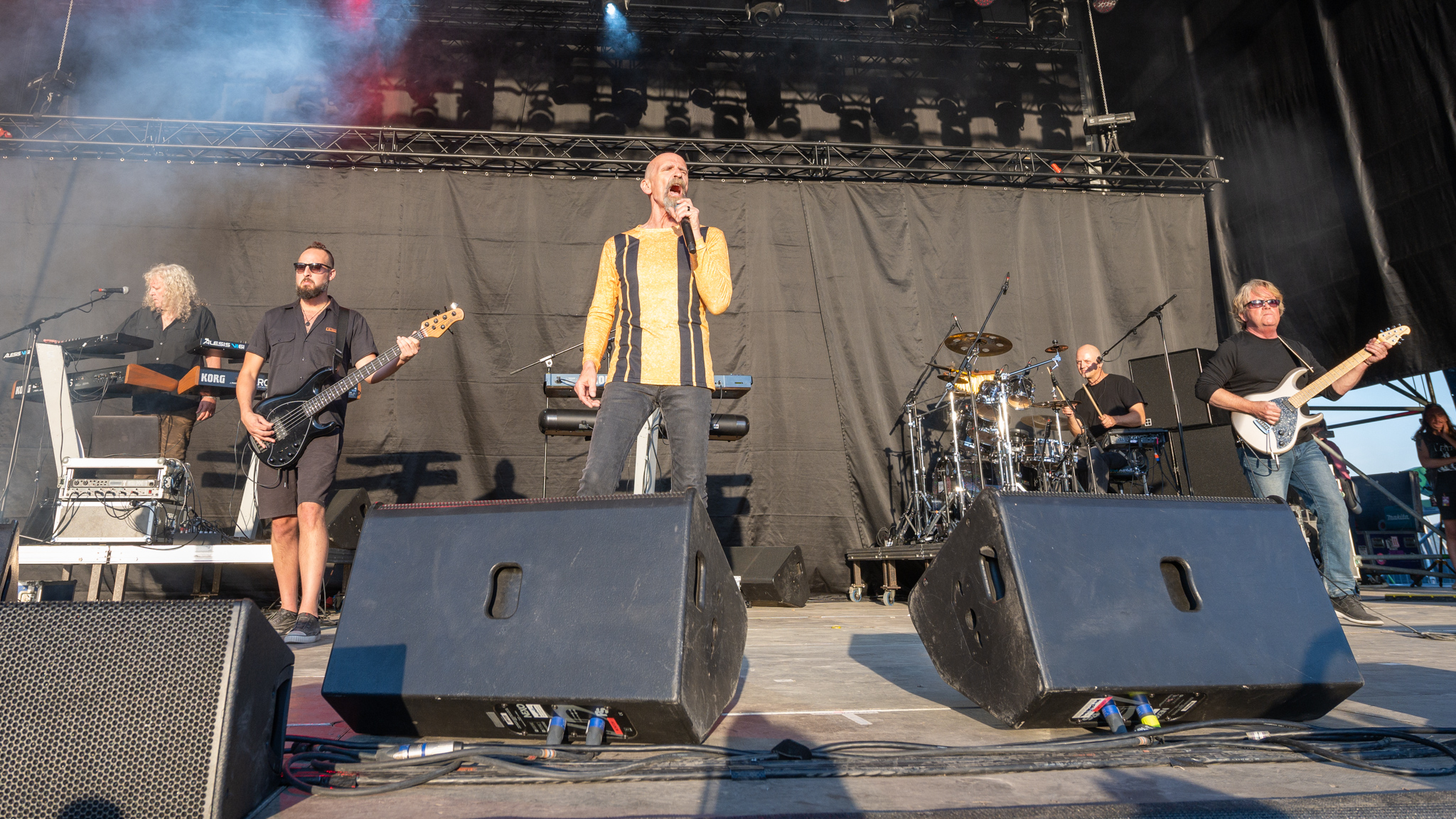
- Saga in 2022

Background information
- Origin: Oakville, Ontario, Canada
- Genres: Progressive rock; new wave; power pop; neo-prog
- Years active: 1977–present
- Labels: Portrait, Warner Bros., Atlantic
- Spinoff of: Fludd
- Members: Michael Sadler; Ian Crichton; Jim Gilmour; Mike Thorne; Mike Borkosky
- Past members: Curt Cress; Jim Crichton; Brian Doerner; Rob Moratti; Steve Negus; Christian Simpson; Peter Rochon; Gregg Chadd; Glen Sobel; Dusty Chesterfield
- Website: sagagen.com

Saga is a Canadian rock band from Oakville, Ontario. Bassist and keyboardist Jim Crichton and Welsh-born vocalist and keyboardist Michael Sadler are the principal songwriters.

Saga has had numerous line-up changes over the years. Ian Crichton and Jim Crichton were the only two original members who appeared on every album. Sadler appeared on every release, apart from the 2009 album The Human Condition. Keyboardist Jim Gilmour was with the band from 1979, making his debut on the album Silent Knight. Drummer Steve Negus performed with Saga until 1986. The lineup was supplemented by many session musicians and live performers from the late 1980s to the late 2000s.

Saga has been awarded gold and platinum albums worldwide and have sold more than eight million albums.

== History ==
Originally known as Pockets, Saga formed in 1977 from the nucleus of Canadian rock band Fludd. In April 1978, they released their self-titled debut album Saga. A modest success in Canada, it would eventually sell over 30,000 copies in Germany as an import.

Their 1979 follow-up album Images at Twilight gave them their first charting single in Canada, with the song "It's Time" peaking at No. 84 in the Canadian Charts. From the album, the songs "See Them Smile" and "Slow Motion" became strong radio favourites elsewhere. Saga's third album, Silent Knight, was released in 1980, and included the singles "Don't Be Late" and "Careful Where You Step," which continued and furthered the band's international success.

In 1981, the band's fourth album Worlds Apart was released. The lead single, "On the Loose", finally broke them into the Top 40, peaking at No. 22 on the Canadian Charts in January 1982, and in December 1982, proved to be their breakthrough in America where it peaked at No. 26 on the Billboard chart in February 1983. A second single, "Wind Him Up", also fared well, with the help of its music video receiving heavy rotation on MTV, and became their next charting single in America, peaking at No. 64 on Billboard in May 1983. Eventually, Worlds Apart was certified Gold in the US in 1983. The band opened for Jethro Tull on their North American tour in 1982, and for Billy Squier on his Emotions in Motion tour in early 1983.

Following on the success of Worlds Apart, the band won the 1982 Juno Award for "Most Promising Group of the Year."

A fifth album Heads or Tales was released in late 1983 and became another success. The lead single, "The Flyer", fared well in Canada and also became their final U.S. charting single, peaking at No. 79 on Billboard in December 1983. The follow-up single entitled "Scratching the Surface" became popular in Canada, peaking at No. 45 in April 1984.

Their sixth album, Behaviour, was released in 1985 and included the singles, "Listen to Your Heart" and "What Do I Know?" (charted No. 57 in Canada).

=== Separation and reunion ===
In 1986, Steve Negus and Jim Gilmour left the band over management concerns, soon deciding to form a new band project under the name Gilmour-Negus Project (GNP). In 1988, they released their one and only album, Safety Zone (featuring Robert Bevan on lead vocals). Meanwhile, Saga continued to record and tour, with Michael Sadler and the Crichton brothers augmented by session musicians.

Their 1987 release Wildest Dreams enjoyed better distribution under new label, Atlantic Records, but it failed to match expectations in America. The lead single "Only Time Will Tell" became a popular chart favourite in Canada (No. 93), with a memorable video rotated on MTV for a brief period. However, the remainder of the album suffered from over-reliance on technology, with armies of sequencers and drum machines replacing much of the band's earlier trademark sound with Gilmour and Negus.

For 1989's The Beginner's Guide to Throwing Shapes, Saga refocused on their earlier European popularity which marked a return to their earlier progressive style with a few sci-fi orientated pop elements to it. In 1992, Steve Negus and Jim Gilmour returned to Saga. The band's next album, The Security of Illusion, released in 1993, was well received by Saga fans in Canada and Europe. The 1994 followup, Steel Umbrellas, was considered uneven when compared to their previous release, perhaps due to the material originally being produced for the short-lived television series Cobra. However, despite lackluster album sales, Saga's 1993 and 1994 tours helped maintain some of the band's early popularity; their reputation as live performers was not lost among the band's long time fans.

=== Comeback ===
In 1995, Jim Crichton composed and produced the majority of Saga's next album, the conceptual Generation 13. Inspired by a popular political treatise by the same name, the story follows main character Jeremy's troubled search for his real father. The concept is somewhat reminiscent of the storyline in The Who's Quadrophenia. The album's heavier compositions have a sound similar to fellow Canadians, progressive rock band Rush, and even early Kansas.

Saga's next release, Pleasure and the Pain was released on the eve of their 20th anniversary tour in 1997. The album failed to maintain the interest created by the previous release. On the same anniversary tour, the album Phase 1 was released. Phase 1 was an album containing demo songs from the 1979 album Images at Twilight — some of them were songs found not good enough for the album, some of them were different versions of songs released on Images. The album quickly sold out and a second issue was printed. The album was hard to get and it soon became a most wanted item for Saga collectors and fans.

Their 1998 tour was captured on the next album, Detours, a double-live album released worldwide. Saga's next three albums, 1999's Full Circle, 2001's House of Cards, and 2003's Marathon have all been popular with the band's longtime and loyal fanbase. House of Cards, in particular enjoyed renewed interest. Its acoustic-flavoured single, "Money Talks", received Top 5 video airplay in Canada. All three albums included new "chapters", representing a return to the progressive rock of the band's early days. Saga released a new studio album, Network, in the fall of 2004. Their next album, Trust, was released in 2006, featuring Brian Doerner as their new drummer. Doerner made his debut on a live Canadian television broadcast in late 2005.

Even though Jim Crichton and Michael Sadler both live in Los Angeles, they have not committed Saga to any full-length American tours since 1986. However, in late 2005, Michael Sadler announced a limited tour on the West Coast to promote his solo album, Clear. The trek featured Ian Crichton as touring guitarist. Saga also played one show in New York City during their summer 2006 tour in support of Trust.

=== The Chapters ===
The Chapters is the name given to a series of songs that the band revealed over a 28-year period in a mixed-up order, creating a conceptual puzzle. Each song in the sequence was subtitled "Chapter One", "Chapter Two", etc. In its final form, The Chapters tells a cohesive science fiction story concerning the preservation of Albert Einstein's brain, aliens who are concerned with humanity's self-destruction, and the resurrection of the dead through technology.

The first eight Chapters were issued, out of order, across the band's first four albums, issued between 1978 and 1981. After a long layoff, Chapters 9 through 16 were issued, again out of order, across three album releases between 1999 and 2003. Songs from the cycle have been performed in concert throughout their career. The Chapters were finally released all together in a 2 CD live recording called The Chapters Live in 2005.

=== Legacy and recent activity ===
Despite the band's fluctuating musical styles and limited commercial success in the United States, their fans have remained extremely loyal over the decades. Their musical style was defined by Ian Crichton's staccato guitar riffs, often in harmony with a synthesizer, and complex keyboard arrangements, frequently featuring three players.

The band has been constantly successful in Germany since its inception. It is also very popular in Puerto Rico; Saga has visited the island twelve times. Saga's second concert in Puerto Rico (1981) caused riots from fans trying to crash into a sold-out concert that sold over 10,000 tickets. Most of the inner cover photographs from the original vinyl release of In Transit (1982) were taken in Puerto Rico, including a live photograph from the 1981 concert. For a few years, a keyboard riff from their song "No Regrets" became the background music for station breaks at WCAD-FM in San Juan. The band received formal recognition as distinguished visitors from the Puerto Rican legislature in February 2005. Their concert on December 9, 2007 (at the Pier 10 Arena club in Old San Juan), was the last concert that Michael Sadler did with Saga until his announcement of returning to the band in January 2011.

On January 16, 2007, it was announced by InsideOut, the band's current record label, that lead singer Michael Sadler would be leaving Saga for personal reasons at the end of 2007. Later that year on Michael's personal site, michaelsadler.com, a note was posted by the singer revealing that his departure was due to a desire to focus on his family life and retire from the stress of being in an active travelling band. A farewell tour of sorts was in the works which also commemorated Saga's 36th anniversary as a band. Saga announced on July 15, 2007, that they were recording a new album in Los Angeles. Titled 10,000 Days the album was released on November 6, 2007, in conjunction with their planned European tour. ("10,000 days" equates to 27 years, 4.54 months, approximately the amount of time Sadler spent with the band). Sadler also recorded a forthcoming DVD commemorating his last European tour with Saga. Just prior to the release of 10,000 Days, in October 2007 drummer Brian Doerner suffered a heart attack. He has since made a full recovery, but a stand-in drummer (Chris Sutherland) of the Kim Mitchell Band was required to fulfill touring commitments.

Saga announced they were auditioning lead vocalists to continue the band's career. The musicians recorded instrumental versions of "On the Loose" and "Wind Him Up" for prospective singers to perform on YouTube, with the winning candidate to be announced at a later date. During the search, Ian Crichton remarked that hopeful candidates "should have a set of pipes" as well as personality. The guitarist also remarked that a Canadian would be preferable, presumably because of travel considerations and the band's nationality. Over 20 candidates (including one woman) submitted demos from across the Atlantic and Caribbean.

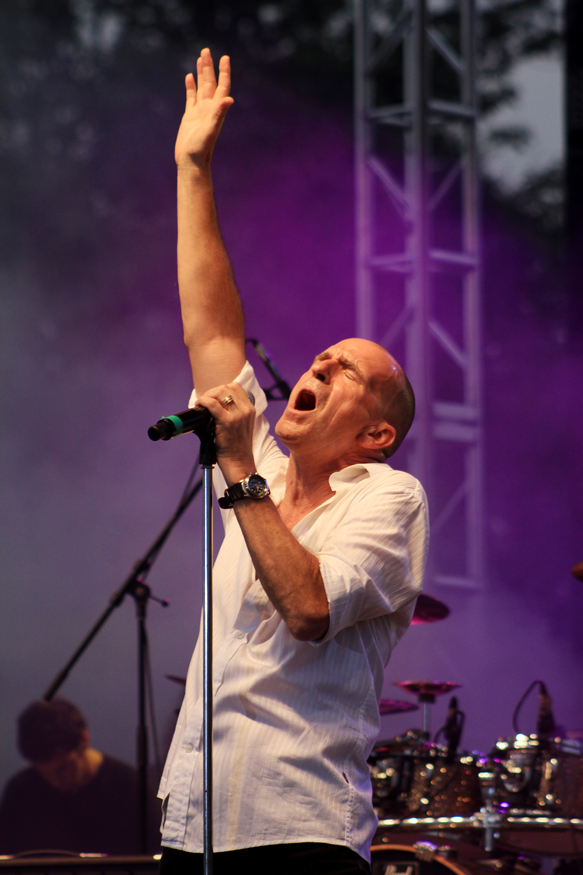
Michael Sadler in August 2011

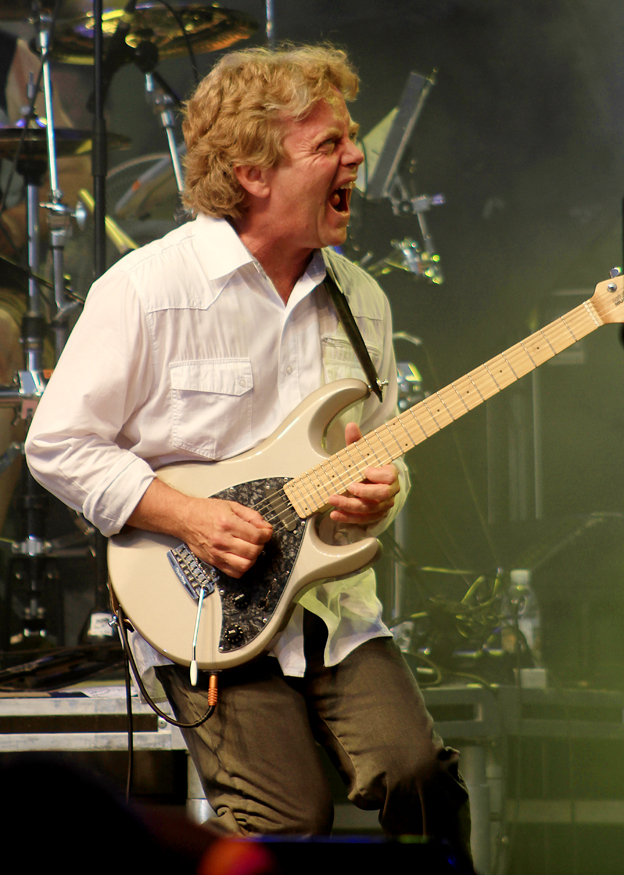
Ian Crichton in August 2011

On April 15, 2008, Saga announced that Rob Moratti of Toronto, former singer of Final Frontier, had joined the band as the new lead vocalist. Moratti's background included more than a decade of experience in the Canadian rock music industry, recently working with the respected guitarist-producer Mladen Zaron. Throughout his tenure with the band, Moratti concentrated on lead vocals, leaving the band's instrumental dynamics somewhat changed from the Sadler era, where the lead vocalist often doubled on bass guitar and keyboards. Saga's first gig with Moratti took place in the summer of 2008. Also, 2008 saw the release of a book about the band's history, Saga: The Biography, by renowned rock journalist (and long-time friend of Saga), Edwin Ammerlaan.

In 2009, Saga released their first CD with Rob Moratti. This CD was titled The Human Condition and was released in the spring 2009. The band toured in Europe and Canada.

On January 28, 2011, an official statement was made announcing Michael Sadler's return as the lead singer of Saga.

On February 1, 2012, Saga announced that after 6 years of touring and recording together, Brian Doerner and Saga have parted ways. Following YouTube auditions, Mike Thorne (a native of Toronto) was announced as the new drummer of Saga. On July 6, 2012, Saga's twentieth studio album, 20/20, was released. It marked the return of original vocalist Michael Sadler.

On June 27, 2014, Saga released their 21st album entitled Sagacity, which received mostly positive feedback from fans. The album quickly topped the iTunes rock lists around Europe (most notably in Germany).

A reissue campaign covering the later years (from 1989 to 2007) was announced in 2015, spanning twelve albums in twelve months. However, after five remastered albums the campaign was seemingly aborted without any official statement from the record company, the live recordings intended for the series instead appearing as a live album Live in Hamburg 2015, which is strictly limited to 5000 copies worldwide.

In January 2017, Michael Sadler announced Saga's retirement following the completion of their farewell tour dubbed The Final Chapter Tour, which also marked their 40th anniversary. He also said that a "very special one-off performance" would take place on the 2018 edition of Cruise to the Edge in February 2018.

On August 5, 2018, bassist and co-founder Jim Crichton departed the band before the final two shows, and was replaced by new member Dusty Chesterfield. Despite Crichton's departure, he would continue his services in the band. The tour spawned the live release So Good So Far – Live at Rock of Ages, which was released on September 28, 2018.

After reconsideration from the request by the fans, Saga opted to continue with their live performances.

In early 2020, the band performed in Germany and Scandinavia as part of their Out of the Shadows World Tour.

Following the completion of the tour, the band members entered their respective home studios during the COVID-19 pandemic lockdowns to record an acoustic album titled Symmetry, which was released on March 12, 2021. The first single "Tired World" was made available for streaming, followed by "Wind Him Up" and "Always There". For the latter, the fans were asked to send in video material, which was then assembled into a video clip.

== Band members ==
Saga at Lieder am See in 2022

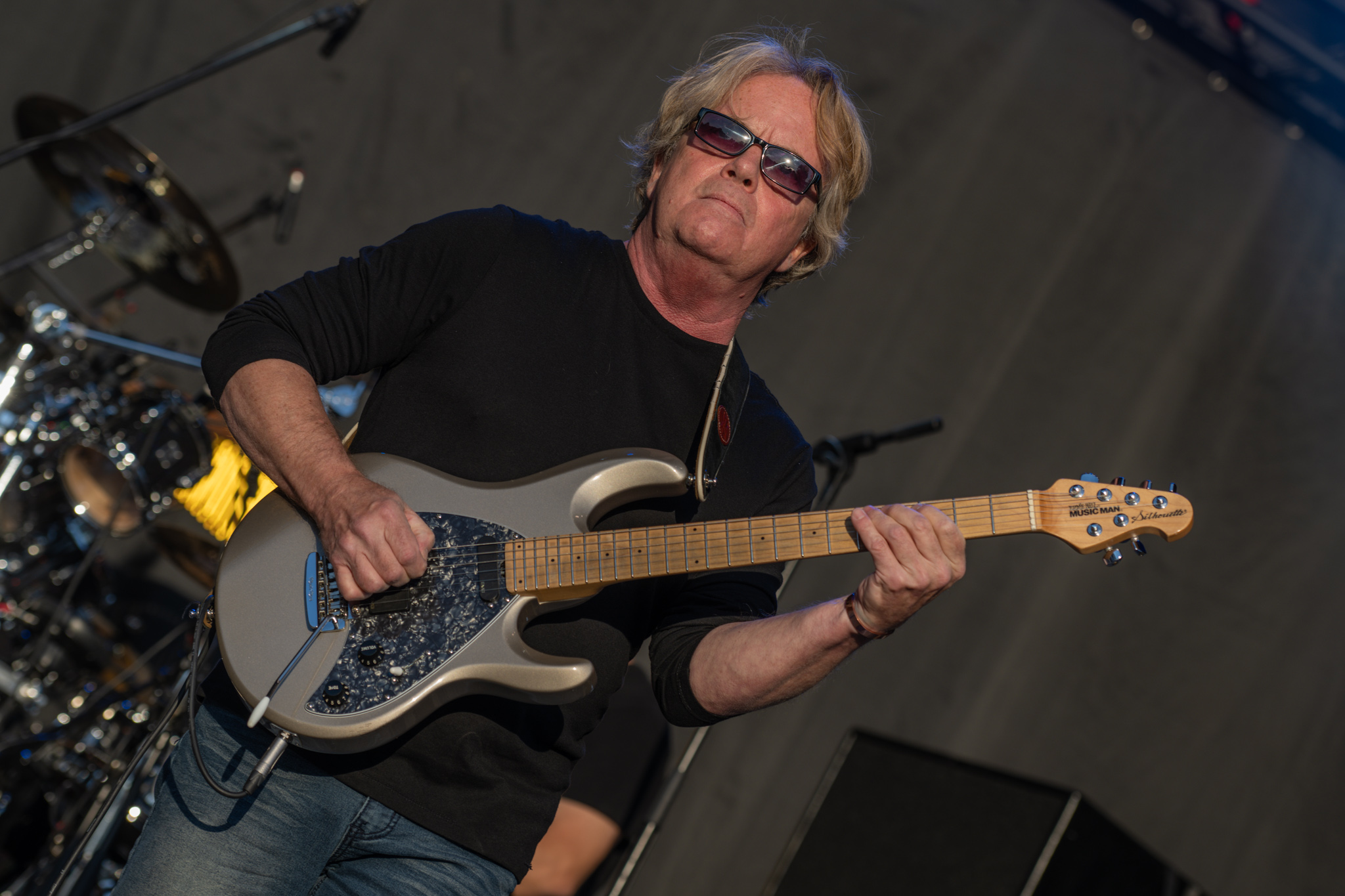
Ian Crichton

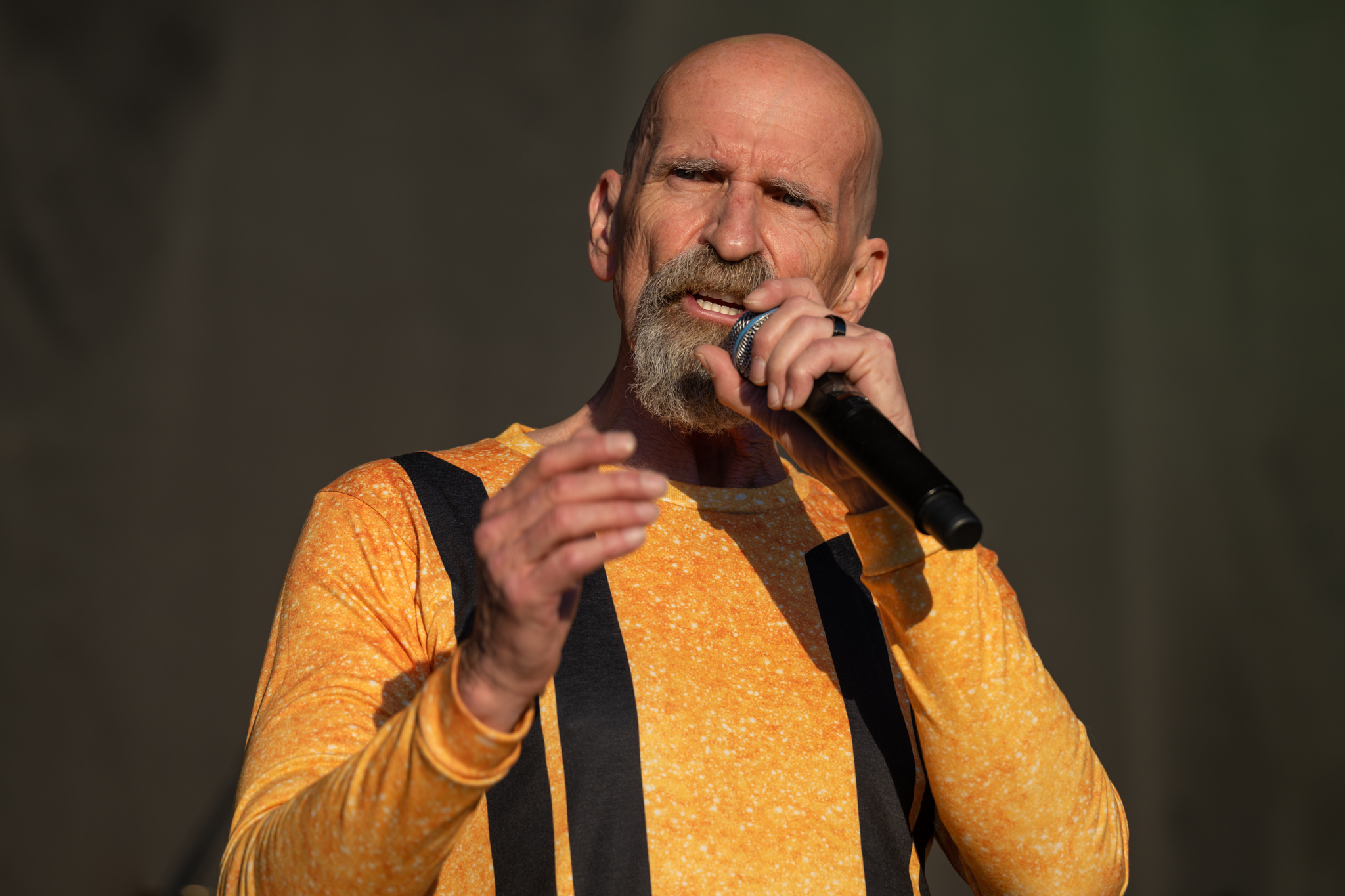
Michael Sadler

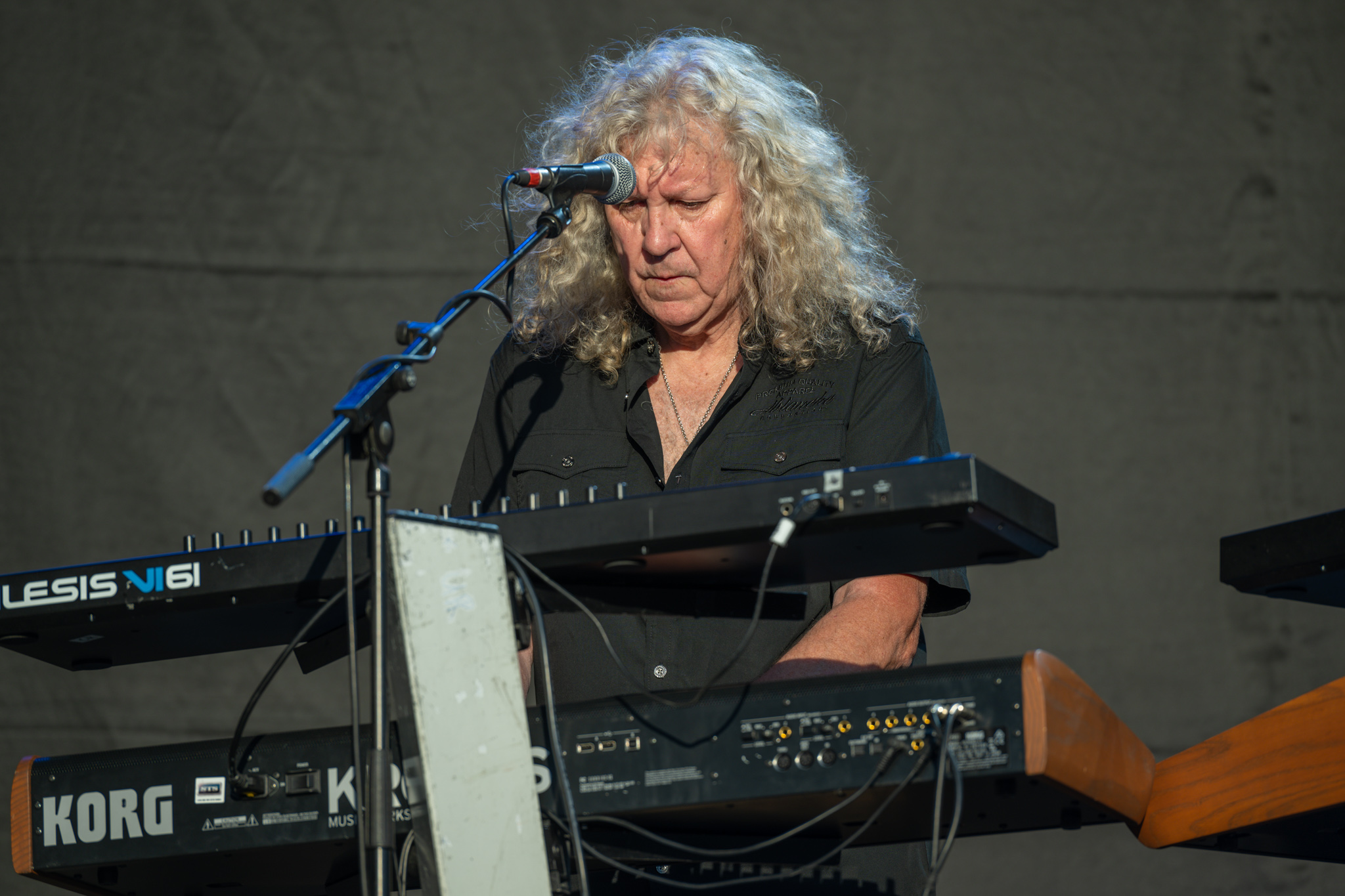
Jim Gilmour

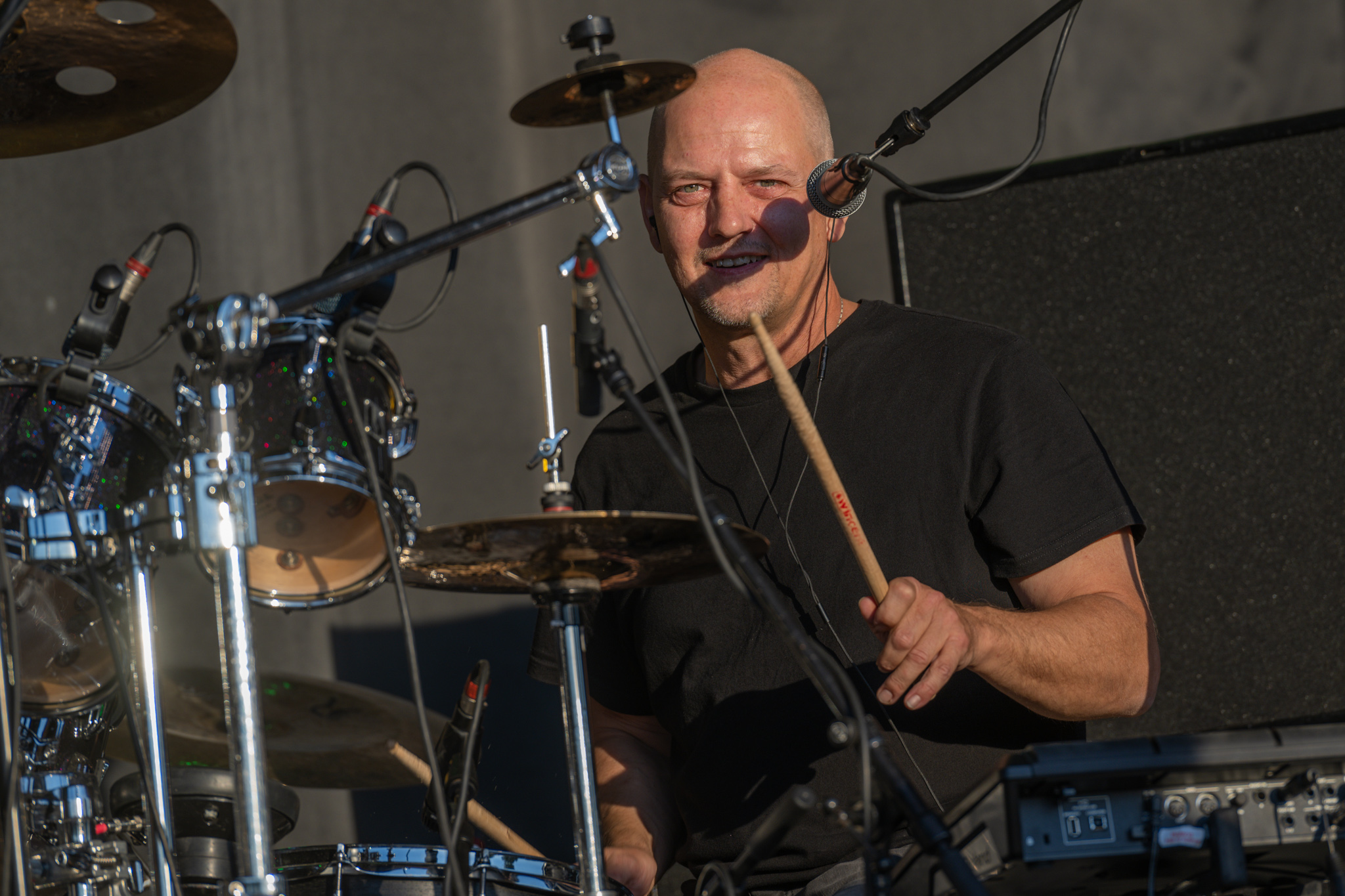
Mike Thorne

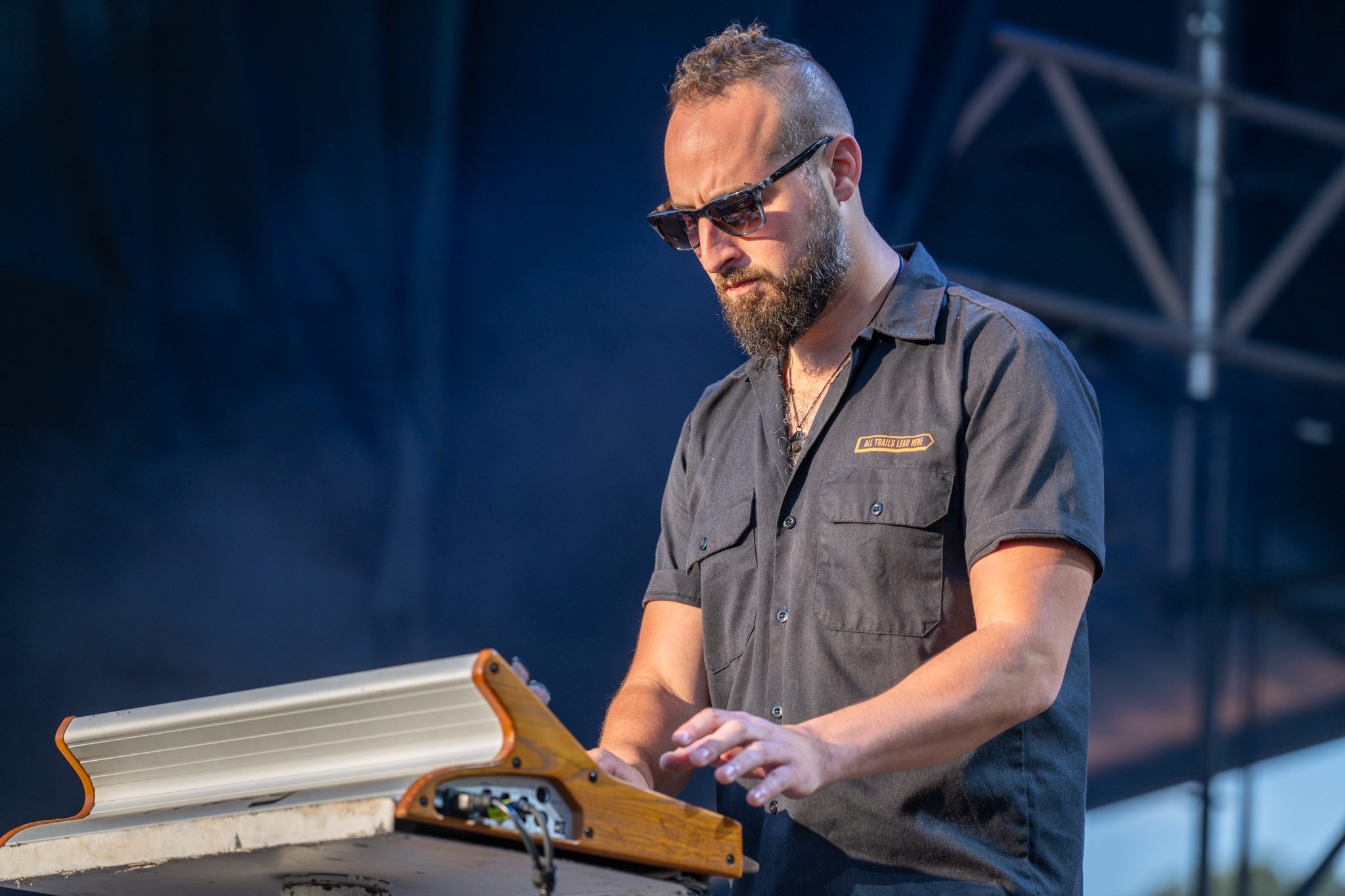
Dusty Chesterfield

Current

- Ian Crichton – guitar, SynthAxe, banjo (1977–present)
- Jim Crichton – bass, keyboards, Moog synthesizer, guitar, SynthAxe (1977–present; non touring since 2019)
- Michael Sadler – vocals, guitar, bass, synthesizer, drums (1977–2007, 2011–present)
- Jim Gilmour – synthesizer, keyboards, vocals, clarinet, saxophone, harmonica (1980–1986, 1992–present)
- Mike Thorne – drums, electronic drums, vocals (2012–present)
- Mike Borkosky – bass, keyboards, Moog synthesizer (2026–present)

Former

- Steve Negus – drums (1977–1986, 1992–2003)
- Peter Rochon – synthesizer, keyboards (1977–1978)
- Gregg Chadd – synthesizer, keyboards (1979)
- Christian Simpson – drums (2003–2005)
- Brian Doerner – drums, backing vocals (2006–2012)
- Rob Moratti – vocals (2008–2011)
- Dusty Chesterfield – bass, keyboards, Moog synthesizer (2019–2026)

Session and touring

- Curt Cress – drums (1987, 1989; studio)
- Trevor Murrell – drums (1988; tour)
- Tim Moore – synthesizer (1988; tour)
- Graham Lear – drums (1990; session)
- Richard Baker – Moog synthesizer (1990; session)
- Marcus Deml – guitar (1995 European tour; session)
- Glen Sobel – drums (1997; studio)
- Chris Sutherland – drums (2007 tour, 2009 tour; session)
- Brad Park – drums (2023, 2024–2025 tour)
- Mike Borkosky – bass (2024–2025 tour)

== Discography ==
=== Studio albums ===
Title	Release	Peak chart positions						
Title	Release	CAN	US	GER	NOR	SWE	SWI	AUT
Saga	1978	—	—	—	—	33	—	—
Images at Twilight	1979	—	—	—	—	—	—	—
Silent Knight	1980	42	—	—	15	42	—	—
Worlds Apart	1981	22	29	9	5	33	—	—
Heads or Tales	1983	17	92	3	4	4	4	—
Behaviour	1985	39	87	2	6	4	3	29
Wildest Dreams	1987	77	—	18	11	8	17	—
The Beginner's Guide to Throwing Shapes	1989	—	—	—	—	—	—	—
The Security of Illusion	1993	—	—	46	—	41	38	—
Steel Umbrellas	1994	—	—	65	—	29	39	—
Generation 13	1995	—	—	89	—	—	49	—
Pleasure & the Pain	1997	—	—	93	—	—	—	—
Full Circle	1999	—	—	44	—	—	—	—
House of Cards	2001	—	—	34	—	—	100	—
Marathon	2003	—	—	40	—	—	—	—
Network	2004	—	—	78	—	—	—	—
Trust	2006	—	—	23	—	37	—	—
10,000 Days	2007	—	—	78	—	—	—	—
The Human Condition	2009	—	—	91	—	—	—	—
20/20	2012	—	—	13	—	39	—	—
Sagacity	2014	—	—	17	—	—	32	—
Symmetry	2021	—	—	11	—	—	20	—

=== Live albums ===
Title	Release
In Transit	Recorded & released: 1982; Formats: LP CD (No. 10 CAN)
Detours – Live	Recorded: 1997 / Released: 1998; Formats: 2CD
The Chapters Live	Recorded: 2003 / Released: 2005; Formats: 2CD
Worlds Apart Revisited	Recorded: 2005 / Released: 2007; Formats: 2CD + 2DVD
Contact – Live in Munich	Recorded: 2007 / Released: 2009; Formats: 2CD or 2CD + 2DVD
Heads or Tales – Live	Recorded: 2010 / Released: 2011; Formats: CD
Spin It Again! Live in Munich	Recorded: 2012 / Released: 2013; Formats: 2CD
Live in Hamburg	Recorded: 2015 / Released: 2016; Formats: 2CD 2LP
So Good So Far – Live at Rock of Ages	Recorded: 2017 / Released: 2018; Formats: 2CD Digipak, 2LP Gatefold+download code, DVD, Blu-ray and Digital

=== Compilation albums ===
Title	Release
Time's Up	Released: 1986; Formats: LP
The Works	Released: 1991; Formats: 2CD 2LP
1978–1993 All the Best	Released: 1993; Formats:
The Very Best of	Released: 1994; Formats:
Defining Moments	Released: 1994; Formats:
Saga Softworks	Released: 1995; Formats:
How Do I Look	Released: 1998; Formats:
Phase 1	Released: 1998; Formats:
Remember When – The Very Best of Saga	Released: 2006; Formats: 2CD
The Collection	Released: 2013; Formats: 3CD
Best of – Now and Then – The Collection	Released: 2015; Formats: 2CD
The Polydor Legacy	Released: 2017; Formats:
The Best of Saga: All Hits Since 1978	Released: 2021; Formats:

=== Singles ===
Title	B-Side	Release	Peak chart positions				Album
Title	B-Side	Release	CAN	GER	US	US Main	Album
"How Long"	"Humble Stance"	1978	—	—	—	—	Saga
"It's Time"	"Take It or Leave It"	1979	84	—	—	—	Images at Twilight
"See Them Smile"	"Mouse In a Maze"	1979	—	—	—	—	Images at Twilight
"Don't Be Late"	"Time to Go"	1980	—	—	—	—	Silent Knight
"Careful Where You Step"	"Compromise"	1980	—	—	—	—	Silent Knight
"Wind Him Up"	"No Stranger"	1981	22	7	64	24	Worlds Apart
"On the Loose"	"Framed"	1981	—	26	26	3	Worlds Apart
"Time's Up"	"Amnesia"	1982	—	—	—	—	Worlds Apart
"On the Loose" (Live)	"Don't Be Late" (Live)	1982	—	—	—	—	In Transit
"How Long" (Live)	"On the Loose" (Live)	1982	—	—	—	—	In Transit
"The Flyer"	"The Writing"	1983	—	—	79	19	Heads or Tales
"Cat Walk"	"Social Orphan	1983	—	—	—	—	Heads or Tales
"Scratching the Surface"	"The Vendetta"	1983	45	—	—	—	Heads or Tales
"What Do I Know"	"Here I Am"	1985	57	65	—	24	Behaviour
"Misbehaviour"	"You and the Night"	1985	—	—	—	—	Behaviour
"Only Time Will Tell"	"We've Been Here Before"	1987	93	—	—	—	Wildest Dreams
"Angel"	"The Way of the World"	1987	—	—	—	—	Wildest Dreams
"The Nineties"	"How Do I Look"	1989	—	—	—	—	The Beginner's Guide to Throwing Shapes
"Gotta Love It"	"Solsbury Hill"	1991	—	—	—	—	The Works
"The Call"	"On the Loose"	1992	—	—	—	—	The Works
"The Security of Illusion"	"Stand Up"	1993	—	—	—	—	The Security of Illusion
"You Were Never Alone"	"(Walking On) Thin Ice"	1994	—	—	—	—	Steel Umbrellas
"Why Not"	"Steamroller"	1994	—	—	—	—	Steel Umbrellas
"On the Loose"	"We Hope You're Feeling Better" "The Cross (Remix)"	1995	—	—	—	—	Generation 13
"Home"	"The One"	1999	—	—	—	—	Full Circle
"Money Talks"	"Don't Give Up"	2001	—	—	—	—	House of Cards
"Rise and Shine"	"Hands Up"	2003	—	—	—	—	Marathon
"It's Your Life"	"Trust"	2006	—	—	—	—	Trust
"Tired World"	—	2020	—	—	—	—	Symmetry
"Wind Him Up"	—	2021	—	—	—		Symmetry
"Always There"	—	2021	—	—	—	—	Symmetry
"—" denotes a recording that did not chart or was not released in that territory.

== Videography ==
DVD title	Release
SILHOUETTE	Released: 2002; Formats: DVD
Marathon World Tour 2003: The Official Bootleg	Recorded & released: 2003; Formats: DVD
All Areas – Live in Bonn 2002	Recorded: 2002 / Released: 2004; Formats: DVD or 2DVD (including The Official Bootleg)
Worlds Apart Revisited	Recorded: 2005 / Released: 2007; Formats: 2CD + 2DVD
Contact – Live in Munich	Recorded: 2007 / Released: 2009; Formats: 2DVD or 2CD + 2DVD
Spin It Again! Live in Munich	Recorded: 2012 / Released: 2013; Formats: 2CD or DVD or Blu-ray
