= Spin It Again! Live in Munich =

Live album by Saga
- Released: 27 September 2013
- Recorded: November 2012
- Venue: Muffathalle Munich
- Genre: Progressive Rock
- Length: 109:07
- Label: earMUSIC

Saga chronology
20/20 (2012)	Spin It Again! Live in Munich (2013)	Sagacity (2014)

Spin It Again! Live in Munich is a live album and video by the Canadian band Saga. It was recorded in 2012 at the end of their 20/20 tour and celebrates the reunion with original singer Michael Sadler. It was also the first Saga release featuring their new drummer Mike Thorne. Besides three songs from 20/20, it includes mainly songs from the first five Saga albums. The concert was released on different formats by edel records/earMUSIC, including a double CD, DVD (Super Jewel Box packaging) and Blu-Ray. The video formats also include a twenty-minute tour documentary. The CD has edited applause between the main set and the encores, but otherwise the performance is identical. As is typical for Saga shows in Germany, Michael Sadler does some German announcements. The concert also includes a little "unplugged" set. After returning to the stage, Sadler says "What shall I play?". He starts on "Images (Chapter 1)", then stops, goes into "No Regrets (Chapter 5)", stops again and finally declares "I got it!" before launching into "Tired World (Chapter 6)".

The live version of "On the Loose" was on radio rotation around the time of release, so it can be viewed as the "single" from the album.

== Track listing ==
Disc 1
No.	Title	Length
1.	"Anywhere You Wanna Go"	6:30
2.	"Mouse in a Maze"	5:59
3.	"Careful Where You Step"	4:50
4.	"The Perfectionist"	6:27
5.	"You're Not Alone"	7:17
6.	"Spin It Again"	4:53
7.	"Corkentellis" (Instrumental)	6:36
8.	"The Flyer"	4:11
9.	"Fish Beats" (Drum Solo)	3:40

Disc 2
No.	Title	Length
1.	"Six Feet Under"	5:46
2.	"The Cross"	4:36
3.	"Time's Up" (Only Michael Sadler and Jim Gilmour on two keyboards)	2:54
4.	"Scratching the Surface" (Jim Gilmour solo)	5:27
5.	"Tired World (Chapter 6)"	8:39
6.	"Humble Stance"	6:33
7.	"On the Loose"	4:58
8.	"Wind Him Up"	6:29
9.	"Framed" (First Encore)	5:42
10.	"Don't Be Late (Chapter 2)" (Second Encore)	7:34

== Personnel ==
- Michael Sadler - Lead Vocals, Keyboards, Bass Guitar on "Humble Stance"
- Jim Gilmour - Main Keyboards, Backing Vocals, Lead Vocals on "Scratching the Surface" and Co-Lead Vocals on "The Cross"
- Ian Crichton - Guitar
- Jim Crichton - Bass Guitar, Bass Synth, Keyboards on "Humble Stance"
- Mike Thorne - Drums, Percussion, Backing Vocals

== Charts ==
Chart (2013)	Peak position
German Albums (Offizielle Top 100)	45
