= Heads or Tales =

Studio album by Saga
- Released: September 29, 1983
- Recorded: The Farmyard, Little Chalfont, Buckinghamshire, England
- Genres: Progressive rock; new wave
- Length: 40:23 (vinyl) / 47:47 (CD)
- Labels: Portrait, Maze
- Producer: Rupert Hine

Saga chronology
In Transit (1982)	Heads or Tales (1983)	Behaviour (1985)

Professional ratings
Review scores
Source	Rating
AllMusic	4/5 stars

Heads or Tales is the fifth studio album by the Canadian progressive rock band Saga, released in 1983. The album was the second of the band's to be produced by Rupert Hine. Although it did not attain the same commercial success and status of the previous collaboration between the band and Hine, Worlds Apart (1981), both "The Flyer" and "Cat Walk" became respectable radio hits for the band with the album eventually securing gold status in Canada (50,000) and Germany (250,000). A third single from the album, "Scratching the Surface", became a live staple and fan favourite in the band's concert line-up during the late-1990s and 2000s as a piano solo played by Jim Gilmour during a break by the other band members. The song reached #45 in the Canadian Singles charts, April 1984.

== Track listing ==
Side One
No.	Title	Lyrics	Music	Length
1.	"The Flyer"	Jim Crichton	J. Crichton, Michael Sadler	3:47
2.	"Cat Walk"	J. Crichton	J. Crichton, Jim Gilmour, Ian Crichton	4:24
3.	"The Sound of Strangers"	Sadler	Sadler, J. Crichton, Gilmour, I. Crichton, Steve Negus	4:09
4.	"The Writing"	J. Crichton	J. Crichton, Sadler	4:14
5.	"Intermission"	Sadler	Sadler, J. Crichton, I. Crichton	5:28

Side Two
No.	Title	Lyrics	Music	Length
6.	"Social Orphan"	Sadler	Sadler, J. Crichton	3:24
7.	"The Vendetta (Still Helpless)"	Sadler	Sadler, J. Crichton, Gilmour, I. Crichton	3:55
8.	"Scratching the Surface"	Gilmour	Gilmour, J. Crichton	5:26
9.	"The Pitchman"	J. Crichton	J. Crichton, Sadler, I. Crichton, Gilmour, Negus	5:46

Bonus track (CD and cassette only)
No.	Title	Length
1.	"Cat Walk" (Unabridged)	7:44

== Personnel ==
Saga:

- Michael Sadler – lead vocals (all but track #8), keyboards
- Ian Crichton – guitar
- Jim Gilmour – lead keyboards, backing and lead (8) vocals, sax
- Jim Crichton – bass guitar, keyboards
- Steve Negus – drums, percussion, electronic percussion

Production:

- Judith Salavetz, Spencer Drate – art direction, design
- Stephen Durke – front and back illustrations artwork
- Andrew Scarth – assistant engineer
- Stephen W Tayler – recording and mixing engineer
- Larry Williams – inner sleeve photography
- Producer – Rupert Hine

== Charts ==
=== Weekly charts ===
Chart (1983)	Peak position
Canada Top Albums/CDs (RPM)	17
Finnish Albums (The Official Finnish Charts)	26
German Albums (Offizielle Top 100)	3
Norwegian Albums (VG-lista)	4
Swedish Albums (Sverigetopplistan)	4
Swiss Albums (Schweizer Hitparade)	4
US Billboard 200	92

=== Year-end charts ===
Chart (1983)	Position
German Albums (Offizielle Top 100)	58

== Certifications ==
Region	Certification	Certified units/sales
Canada (Music Canada)	Gold	50,000^{^}
Germany (BVMI)	Gold	250,000^{^}
^{^} Shipments figures based on certification alone.
