= The Human Condition (Saga album) =

Studio album by Saga
- Released: 19 May 2009
- Recorded: at Metalworks Studios in Mississauga, Ontario
- Genre: Progressive rock
- Length: 47:16
- Label: InsideOut Music, SPV GmbH
- Producer: Cam Butler

Saga chronology
10,000 Days (2007)	The Human Condition (2009)	20/20 (2012)

Professional ratings
Review scores
Source	Rating
Allmusic	3/5 stars

The Human Condition is the nineteenth studio album by Canadian rock band Saga. It is notable for being their only studio album on which the group’s original lead vocalist, Michael Sadler, does not appear. He was briefly replaced by Rob Moratti.

== Track listing ==
All songs written by Saga.

No.	Title	Length
1.	"The Human Condition"	6:50
2.	"Step Inside"	4:57
3.	"Hands of Time"	5:32
4.	"Avalon"	4:47
5.	"A Number with a Name"	4:53
6.	"Now Is Now"	4:15
7.	"Let It Go"	4:48
8.	"Crown of Thorns"	5:50
9.	"You Look Good to Me"	5:22

== Credits ==
- Rob Moratti – vocals
- Ian Crichton – guitars
- Jim Crichton – bass, keyboards
- Jim Gilmour – keyboards, vocals
- Brian Doerner – drums

== Charts ==
Chart (2009)	Peak position
German Albums (Offizielle Top 100)	91
