= Live in Hamburg (Saga album) =

Live album by Saga
- Released: 2 September 2016
- Recorded: 28 April 2015, Hamburg, Germany
- Venue: Fabrik
- Genre: Progressive rock
- Length: 99:17
- Label: earMUSIC

Saga chronology
Sagacity (2014)	Live in Hamburg (2016)	So Good So Far - Live at Rock of Ages (2018)

Live in Hamburg is a live album by Saga, which was released by earMUSIC on 2 September 2016. It was recorded live in Hamburg on 28 April 2015. While the original plan was to split up the concert and release the recordings as bonus tracks to the 12 albums in 12 months reissues, the series was not continued beyond Pleasure & the Pain and the concert was released in its entirety instead. The original album is strictly limited to 5000 copies worldwide, however, in 2018, earMUSIC reissued the album in a regular jewel case (as opposed to the very sparse original digipack).

The setlist includes a lot of songs not covered on earlier live albums, such as "(Goodbye) Once Upon a Time", "Someone Should", "Hot to Cold", "On My Way", "Time to Go", "I'll Be" and "Wildest Dreams".

== Track listing ==
Disc 1
No.	Title	Length
1.	"(Goodbye) Once Upon a Time"	6:50
2.	"Someone Should"	4:02
3.	"You're Not Alone"	6:20
4.	"Hot to Cold"	4:41
5.	"On the Loose"	5:09
6.	"On My Way"	5:54
7.	"Not This Way (Chapter 10) / Scratching the Surface"	9:40
8.	"Time to Go"	4:11
9.	"I'll Be"	4:30

Disc 2
No.	Title	Length
1.	"Don't Be Late (Chapter 2) / Drum Solo"	11:49
2.	"Wildest Dreams"	4:09
3.	"Ice Nice"	7:07
4.	"Humble Stance"	6:11
5.	"Careful Where You Step"	7:55
6.	"Wind Him Up"	5:42
7.	"The Flyer"	5:00

== Personnel ==
Band members

- Michael Sadler – Lead Vocals, Keyboards, Bass Guitar on "Humble Stance"
- Jim Gilmour – Main Keyboards, Backing Vocals, Lead Vocals on "Scratching the Surface" and "Not This Way", Co-Lead Vocals on "Hot to Cold" and "Time to Go"
- Ian Crichton – Guitar
- Jim Crichton – Bass Guitar, Bass Synth, Keyboards on "Humble Stance"
- Mike Thorne – Drums, Acoustic & Electric Percussion, Backing Vocals

Production

- Project Mayhem (Eike Freese & Alexander Dietz) - Mixing & Mastering

== Reception ==
Rocktopia's Phil Ashcroft commended the inclusion of many rarely played tracks, including "Wildest Dreams" from 1987, and lauded the recording quality. On the negative side, some the tracks are described as "a bit messy" and like many Saga fans, he wonders about the label's release plans. The album is summed up as "as good a set-list as any of their other live albums [that] shows what amazing players and writers they are and how much Sadler is the only vocalist who should ever front this great Canadian band."

On PowerOfMetal.dk, Kenn Jensen also praised the tight playing and sound quality, but criticized the fact that this is Saga's eighth live release and comes so soon after "Spin It Again! Live in Munich" and the live bonus disc of "Sagacity".

On Progarchives.com the release received an average user rating of 4 stars. User reviews likewise point out the inclusion of "some real treats" and the band sounding "young and refreshing".

Sea of Tranquility writer Stephen Reid reviewed the 2018 reissue, also calling it one of Saga's "more interesting live releases" because of the song selection and praising the mix for finding "the perfect mid-point between Ian Crichton’s guitar and Jim Gilmour’s keys-work".
