= Wildest Dreams (Saga album) =

Studio album by Saga
- Released: 1987
- Genres: Rock; progressive rock; adult contemporary
- Length: 36:20
- Label: Atlantic
- Producer: Keith Olsen

Saga chronology
Behaviour (1985)	Wildest Dreams (1987)	The Beginner's Guide to Throwing Shapes (1989)

Professional ratings
Review scores
Source	Rating
Allmusic	1.5/5 stars

Wildest Dreams is the seventh studio album by the Canadian progressive rock band Saga, originally released in 1987. It was their first album without original drummer Steve Negus and longtime keyboardist and vocalist Jim Gilmour.

== Atlantic Records ==
The band signed with Atlantic Records after the Behaviour album and was seen as a promising act for Atlantic after having three solid and successful albums come out during the early and mid-1980s. The record label spent a great deal of money promoting the band in the United States, a market that Saga had yet to penetrate. Plans included a massive tour, a music video produced for the single "Only Time Will Tell" and on the production of the album itself. Despite all of this, the album went largely unnoticed in the U.S. and was only released in Saga's more successful markets like Europe and their native Canada (#77). "Only Time Will Tell" reached #93 in Canada.

== Rarity ==
Because of the limited scope of the original release and an issue with Atlantic refusing to surrender the rights of this album to the band, Wildest Dreams is considered by many fans to be the rarest album of Saga's repertoire to this day. A re-release of the album was done around 2000 although this was before the band's remastering of all other albums in 2002, 2003, and 2004 and thus, made the album's release largely unnoticed by the fan base. While the band has mentioned many times their desire to see the album released again for the fans, the band members have cited Atlantic Records' demand for a prohibitively large rights fee for the album. As of recently, the album is available on Digital platforms 2024

== Track listing ==
Side One
No.	Title	Writer(s)	Length
1.	"Don't Put Out the Fire"	Ian Crichton, Jim Crichton, Michael Sadler	3:58
2.	"Only Time Will Tell"	I. Crichton, J. Crichton, M. Sadler	4:21
3.	"Wildest Dreams"	I. Crichton, J. Crichton, M. Sadler	4:58
4.	"Chase the Wind"	I. Crichton, J. Crichton, Robin Prior, M. Sadler	4:53

Side Two
No.	Title	Writer(s)	Length
5.	"We've Been Here Before"	Curt Cress, I. Crichton, J. Crichton, M. Sadler	4:45
6.	"The Way of the World"	Ian Crichton, Jim Crichton, Michael Sadler	4:18
7.	"Angel"	Ian Crichton, Jim Crichton, Michael Sadler	4:20
8.	"Don't Look Down"	I. Crichton, J. Crichton, Julia Downes, M. Sadler	4:39

== Personnel ==
=== Saga ===
- Michael Sadler – lead vocals, keyboards
- Jim Crichton – bass guitar, keyboards, synthaxe
- Ian Crichton – guitar, shadow midi guitar systems, synthaxe
- Curt Cress – drums, percussion

=== Production ===
- Brian Foraker – engineer
- Gregory Fulginiti – mastering
- Keith Olsen – producer

== Charts ==
Chart (1987)	Peak position
Canada Top Albums/CDs (RPM)	77
Finnish Albums (The Official Finnish Charts)	40
German Albums (Offizielle Top 100)	18
Norwegian Albums (VG-lista)	11
Swedish Albums (Sverigetopplistan)	8
Swiss Albums (Schweizer Hitparade)	17
