= The Security of Illusion =

Studio album by Saga
- Released: 1993
- Recorded: 1993
- Genre: Progressive rock
- Length: 48:21
- Label: Bonaire, Avalanche
- Producer: Saga

Saga chronology
| The Works (1991) | The Security of Illusion (1993) | Steel Umbrellas (1994) |

Professional ratings
Review scores
| Source | Rating |
|---|---|
| AllMusic | 4/5 stars |

The Security of Illusion is the ninth studio album by Saga, originally released in 1993. The album marks the return of keyboardist Jim Gilmour and drummer Steve Negus, both of whom left the band in 1986 due to management concerns.

== Track listing ==
All lyrics and music written by Saga

| No. | Title | Length |
|---|---|---|
| 1. | "Entracte" (Instrumental) | 0:58 |
| 2. | "Mind Over Matter" | 4:35 |
| 3. | "Once Is Never Enough" | 6:04 |
| 4. | "Alone Again Tonight" | 4:14 |
| 5. | "I'll Leave It in Your Hands" | 4:38 |
| 6. | "The Security of Illusion" | 5:40 |
| 7. | "Stand Up" | 4:12 |
| 8. | "Days Like These" | 4:48 |
| 9. | "Voila!" (Instrumental) | 1:42 |
| 10. | "No Man's Land" | 5:20 |
| 11. | "Without You" | 6:10 |

2003 Bonus Track
| No. | Title | Length |
|---|---|---|
| 1. | "The Security of Illusion" (Acoustic Version) | 4:42 |

2015 Bonus Tracks
| No. | Title | Length |
|---|---|---|
| 1. | "The Security of Illusion" (Acoustic Version) | 4:42 |
| 2. | "Scratching the Surface" (Live) | 6:19 |
| 3. | "Ice Nice" (Live) | 5:33 |

== Personnel ==
- Michael Sadler – vocals
- Ian Crichton – guitar
- Jim Gilmour – keyboards, vocals
- Jim Crichton – bass
- Steve Negus – drums, percussion

== Production ==
- Produced by Saga
- Mixed by Shay Baby
- Mastered by Carl Kennedy
- Recording Engineer (Keyboards) – Steve Negus
- Recording Engineer (Guitars) – Ian Crichton
- Recording Engineer (All other instruments) – Jim Crichton

== Charts ==
| Chart (1993) | Peak position |
|---|---|
| German Albums (Offizielle Top 100) | 46 |
| Dutch Albums (Album Top 100) | 56 |
| Swedish Albums (Sverigetopplistan) | 41 |
| Swiss Albums (Schweizer Hitparade) | 38 |
