= 20/20 (Saga album) =

Studio album by Saga
- Released: 6 July 2012
- Genre: Progressive rock
- Length: 48:11
- Label: earMUSIC

Saga chronology
The Human Condition (2009)	20/20 (2012)	Sagacity (2014)

20/20 is the twentieth studio album by Canadian rock band Saga. The album marked the return of original singer Michael Sadler. The album charted at No. 13 in Germany, the highest since their 1985 release Behaviour.

== Track listing ==
All songs written by Saga.

No.	Title	Length
1.	"Six Feet Under"	4:56
2.	"Anywhere You Wanna Go"	5:29
3.	"Ellery"	4:08
4.	"Spin it Again"	4:41
5.	"Another Day Out of Sight"	4:18
6.	"One of These Days"	4:46
7.	"Ball and Chain"	4:17
8.	"Lost for Words"	4:34
9.	"Show and Tell"	4:42
10.	"Till the Well Runs Dry"	6:20
Total length:		48:11

== Credits ==
- Michael Sadler – lead vocals
- Ian Crichton – guitars
- Jim Gilmour – keyboards, backing vocals
- Jim Crichton – bass, keyboards
- Brian Doerner – drums, percussion

== Charts ==
Chart (2012)	Peak position
Belgian Albums (Ultratop Wallonia)	192
German Albums (Offizielle Top 100)	13
Swedish Albums (Sverigetopplistan)	39
