= Trust (Saga album) =

Studio album by Saga
- Released: 23 May 2006
- Recorded: 2006
- Genre: Progressive rock
- Length: 48:19
- Label: InsideOut Music, SPV GmbH

Saga chronology
The Chapters Live (2005)	Trust (2006)	10,000 Days (2007)

Professional ratings
Review scores
Source	Rating
AllMusic	3.5/5 stars

Trust is a studio album by Saga, their seventeenth album of new material. It is the first album to feature former Helix drummer Brian Doerner on drums.

== Track listing ==
All music is composed by Saga, except for "My Friend", written by Ian Crichton and Jim Gilmour.

No.	Title	Length
1.	"That's As Far As I'll Go"	4:36
2.	"Back to the Shadows"	5:16
3.	"I'm OK"	5:36
4.	"Time to Play"	3:31
5.	"My Friend"	3:19
6.	"Trust"	5:44
7.	"It's Your Life"	4:10
8.	"Footsteps in the Hall"	3:25
9.	"Ice in the Rain"	5:01
10.	"You Were Right"	4:05
11.	"On the Other Side"	4:56

== Personnel ==
- Michael Sadler: Vocals
- Ian Crichton: Guitars
- Jim Crichton: Bass, keyboards
- Jim Gilmour: Keyboards, vocals
- Brian Doerner: Drums

== Production ==
- All songs recorded & engineered by Saga, Geoff Kent, Mark Scola
- All songs produced by Saga. Co-produced by Geoff Kent
- Mastered by Peter van't Riet
- Artwork by Balázs Pápay

== Charts ==
Chart (2006)	Peak position
German Albums (Offizielle Top 100)	23
Swedish Albums (Sverigetopplistan)	37
