= Marathon (Saga album) =

Studio album by Saga
- Released: 8 April 2003
- Recorded: 2002
- Genre: Progressive rock; neo-prog
- Length: 51:21
- Label: SPV GmbH, Steamhammer Records, True North
- Producer: Jim Crichton

Saga chronology
House of Cards (2001)	Marathon (2003)	Network (2004)

Professional ratings
Review scores
Source	Rating
AllMusic	2/5 stars

Marathon is a studio album by Saga, their fifteenth album of new material. It is the final album to feature original drummer Steve Negus.

== Track listing ==
All music is composed by Saga.

No.	Title	Length
1.	"Marathon"	4:59
2.	"How Are You?"	5:22
3.	"Breathing Lessons"	4:25
4.	"Hands Up"	3:44
5.	"Streets of Gold (Chapter 14)"	5:11
6.	"Blind Side of the Heart"	4:35
7.	"Return to Forever"	4:26
8.	"You Know I Know (Chapter 12)"	4:36
9.	"Too Deep"	4:21
10.	"Rise and Shine"	3:32
11.	"Worlds Apart (Chapter 16)"	6:10

== The Chapters ==
Three of the songs, "Streets of Gold (Chapter 14)", "You Know I Know (Chapter 12)" and "Worlds Apart (Chapter 16)," were the last part of a second series of eight songs that Saga included within some of their albums called "The Chapters," which told the story of a young Albert Einstein. These songs were included on The Chapters Live, an album that the band released in 2005.

== Personnel ==
- Ian Crichton: Guitar & Background Vocals
- Jim Gilmour: Lead Keyboards & Vocals
- Steve Negus: Drums & Percussion
- Michael Sadler: Lead Vocals & Keyboards
- Jim Crichton: Bass & Keyboards

== Production ==
- Produced by Jim Crichton
- Engineered by Jim Crichton
- Assistant Engineers – Steve Negus, Ian Crichton and Jim Gilmour
- Mixed by Jim Crichton. Assisted by Michael Sadler
- Mastered by Brian Foraker
- Artwork by Eric Fulghum

== Charts ==
Chart (2003)	Peak position
German Albums (Offizielle Top 100)	40
