= Jaclyn Kenyon =

Canadian singer/songwriter (born 1997)

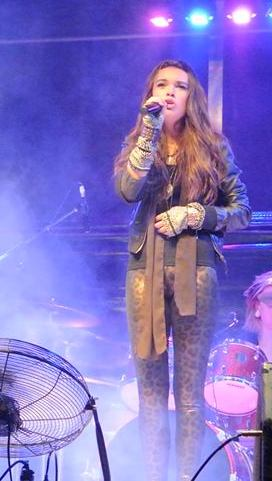
Kenyon performing live in Toronto

Jaclyn Kenyon (born April 5, 1997, in Burlington, Ontario) is a Canadian singer/songwriter.

In 2009, at age 12, Kenyon performed at the Honey Jam showcase in Toronto, Ontario, receiving media attention for being hitherto the youngest performer at the event. The same event also launched the careers of Nelly Furtado and Jully Black.

Kenyon was named by Toronto Star music critic Ben Rayner as one of twelve "people to watch" in the Toronto area in 2012.

In 2015, Kenyon signed her first major production deal with producers Mike Plotnikoff and Igor Khoroshev. Her first album. Her recordings feature guitarist Phil X from Bon Jovi and drummer Gil Sharone from Marilyn Manson.

In 2017, Kenyon began working in with producer Mike Krompass, as well as writers Steve Diamond, Clay Mills and Robbie Nevil; she continues to collaborate with this team.

In June 2019, Kenyon signed a global distribution deal with Sony Music's Orchard subsidiary, along with Soundly Music. Her first release “When We Love” was released that month. In July that year, Kenyon's debut video premiered on CMT.com.

Kenyon moved to Nashville to pursue her career in October 2022
