= Steel Umbrellas =

Studio album by Saga
- Released: 1994
- Recorded: 1994
- Genre: Rock
- Length: 40:34
- Label: Polydor, Steamhammer Records
- Producer: Jim Crichton and Saga

Saga chronology
The Security of Illusion (1993)	Steel Umbrellas (1994)	Generation 13 (1995)

Steel Umbrellas is the tenth studio album by Canadian rock band Saga. The songs were written for the US TV series Cobra. The album is the second produced after the reformation of the classic line-up, and the first one to feature two songs sung by keyboardist Jim Gilmour.

== Track listing ==
All lyrics and music written by Saga, except "(You Were) Never Alone" by Saga and Gerald O' Brien; "Push It" by Saga, Craig Van Sickle and Steve Mitchell

No.	Title	Length
1.	"Why Not?"	4:18
2.	"(You Were) Never Alone"	4:28
3.	"Bet on This"	3:53
4.	"Shake That Tree"	4:18
5.	"Password Pirate / Access Code / Password Pirate"	3:36
6.	"I Walk With You"	4:02
7.	"Push It"	3:02
8.	"Steamroller"	4:12
9.	"Say Goodbye to Hollywood"	4:34
10.	"Feed the Fire"	4:09

2002 & 2015 Bonus Track
No.	Title	Length
11.	"I Walk With You" (Live)	3:12

2015 Bonus Tracks
No.	Title	Length
12.	"On My Way" (Live in Hamburg, 2015)	5:14
13.	"On the Loose" (Live in Hamburg, 2015)	4:33

== Note ==
Alternate versions of the CD include the track "(Walking On) Thin Ice" in place of "Push It". "(Walking On) Thin Ice" was also used as a b-side for the second single release "(You Were) Never Alone", which also included an "edited version" of the album track that opens with a differently mixed intro. "Why Not?" was the first single from the album and also edited for the single release.

== Personnel ==
- Michael Sadler – lead and backing vocals
- Ian Crichton – guitars
- Jim Gilmour – keyboards, backing vocals, lead vocals on "Shake That Tree" and "Say Goodbye to Hollywood"
- Jim Crichton – bass
- Steve Negus – drums, percussion
- Paula Mattioli, Fred White, Stu "The Rooster" Saddoris – backing vocals

== Production ==
- Produced by Jim Crichton & Saga
- Music Supervisor – Spencer Proffer, Cherry Lane Music
- Recording Engineer – Jim Crichton
- Recording Engineer (Keyboards) – Steve Negus
- Mixed by Mike Ging
- Recorded and mixed at Goodnight L.A.B., Van Nuys, California
- Art Direction & Design – Vivid Images
- Front Cover Concept – Penny Crichton
- Photography – Penny Crichton
- Front Cover Images – Joannis and Stephen Jacaruso for Vivid Images
- Steel Umbrellas by Heidi Coyle

== Charts ==
Chart (1994)	Peak position
German Albums (Offizielle Top 100)	65
Swedish Albums (Sverigetopplistan)	29
Swiss Albums (Schweizer Hitparade)	39
