= Behaviour (Saga album) =

Studio album by Saga
- Released: August 19, 1985
- Genre: Progressive rock
- Length: 46:06
- Labels: Portrait, Maze
- Producers: Saga and Peter Walsh

Saga chronology
Heads or Tales (1983)	Behaviour (1985)	Wildest Dreams (1987)

Professional ratings
Review scores
Source	Rating
Allmusic	3/5 stars
Kerrang!	5/5 stars

Behaviour is the sixth studio album by the Canadian progressive rock band Saga, and was originally released in 1985, two years after the moderately successful Heads or Tales. Behaviour was itself successful, and managed to outsell its 1983 predecessor thanks to the strong performance of the single "What Do I Know?" (#57).

The album contains singer Michael Sadler's most personal song, "(Goodbye) Once Upon a Time", which he said was written about his late father and which still brought up strong emotions when performed years after the album's release.

The album reached #39 on the Canadian charts.

== Changes and band break-up ==
The 1985 album was a marked departure for the band as Saga moved on from working with Rupert Hine, who had produced the band's last two albums and helped to land the band commercial success during the early part of that decade. There was an overhaul of both the sounds and styles incorporated by the band during the development of the new album, leading Saga to produce a more pop-oriented sound than their previous progressive rock works.

These changes caused tensions within the band during the production. After the album was released, singer Michael Sadler informed drummer Steve Negus and Jim Gilmour that they were no longer welcome in the band, beginning a rift in the band that lasted until 1991. Speaking in interviews during 2002, at the time the band members regarded this division as only temporary and felt the five members would eventually be reunited.

== Track listing ==
Side One
No.	Title	Lyrics	Music	Length
1.	"Listen to Your Heart"	Michael Sadler	Jim Crichton, Ian Crichton, Sadler, Jim Gilmour, Steve Negus	3:56
2.	"Take a Chance"	J. Crichton	J. Crichton, Gilmour	3:54
3.	"What Do I Know?"	J. Crichton	J. Crichton, Gilmour	3:40
4.	"Misbehaviour"	Sadler	J. Crichton, Sadler, I. Crichton, Gilmour, Negus	4:04
5.	"Nine Lives of Miss Midi"	instrumental	Gilmour, Negus	1:17
6.	"You and the Night"	Sadler	J. Crichton, Sadler	5:16

Side Two
No.	Title	Lyrics	Music	Length
7.	"Out of the Shadows"	Sadler, J. Crichton	Sadler, J. Crichton, I. Crichton	4:48
8.	"Easy Way Out"	Gilmour	J. Crichton, Sadler, I. Crichton, Gilmour, Negus	3:59
9.	"Promises"	Sadler	J. Crichton, Sadler, Gilmour	4:12
10.	"Here I Am"	Sadler	J. Crichton, Sadler, Gilmour	3:34
11.	"(Goodbye) Once Upon a Time"	Sadler	J. Crichton, Sadler, I. Crichton, Gilmour, Negus	6:38

== Personnel ==
Saga

- Michael Sadler - lead vocals, keyboards
- Jim Crichton - bass guitar, keyboards
- Jim Gilmour - keyboards, backing vocals
- Ian Crichton - guitar
- Steve Negus - drums, percussion, electronic percussion

Production

- Sharon Benson - Additional vocals on "What Do I Know?"
- Produced by Saga and Peter Walsh
- Engineered by Peter Walsh
- Mastered at Sterling Sound by Jack Skinner
- Recorded at Compass Point Studios, Nassau, Powerplay Recording Studios, Zurich & Union Studios, Munich
- Sleeve Design - Studio Convertino, Milan
- Photographer - Fred Ereissing

== Charts ==
Chart (1985)	Peak position
Austrian Albums (Ö3 Austria)	29
Canada Top Albums/CDs (RPM)	39
Dutch Albums (Album Top 100)	37
German Albums (Offizielle Top 100)	2
Norwegian Albums (VG-lista)	6
Swedish Albums (Sverigetopplistan)	4
Swiss Albums (Schweizer Hitparade)	3
US Billboard 200	87
