= Generation 13 =

Saga's eleventh studio album

Studio album by Saga
- Released: 26 June 1995
- Recorded: 1995
- Genre: Progressive rock
- Length: 68:50
- Label: Polydor
- Producer: Jim Crichton

Saga chronology
Steel Umbrellas (1994)	Generation 13 (1995)	Pleasure & the Pain (1997)

Professional ratings
Review scores
Source	Rating
AllMusic	2/5 stars

Generation 13 is the eleventh studio album by Saga.

== Concept ==
Generation 13 is a concept album, written by bassist Jim Crichton, which is inspired by the 1993 book 13th Gen: Abort, Retry, Ignore, Fail? by American authors Neil Howe and William Strauss. The book identifies those born between 1961 and 1981 as America's 13th generation, in terms of 20–25 year periods since the American Revolution.

== Track listing ==
No.	Title	Length
1.	"Chances Are #1"	1:42
2.	"Generation 13 (Theme #1)" (Instrumental)	2:43
3.	"All Will Change (Goodbye and Good Luck)"	1:57
4.	"a) The Cross (Home #3)"	4:06
5.	"Danger Whistle" (Spoken)	0:45
6.	"a) Leave Her Alone"	4:33
7.	"I'll Never Be Like You #1"	0:43
8.	"My Name Is Sam (Finding a Friend)"	0:35
9.	"The 13th Generation"	4:26
10.	"The Cross"	2:02
11.	"The Learning Tree"	4:58
12.	"I'll Never Be Like You #2"	3:59
13.	"Snake Oil" (Instrumental)	1:07
14.	"a) We Hope You're Feeling Better (The Test)"	4:57
15.	"My Name Is Sam (Your Time Is Up)"	2:34
16.	"Generation 13 (Theme #2)" (Instrumental)	2:38
17.	"Where Are You Now?"	1:20
18.	"a) Screw 'Em"	4:14
19.	"No Strings Attached"	5:20
20.	"All Will Change (It's Happening to Me)"	2:00
21.	"The Victim"	2:59
22.	"One Small Step" (Spoken – Instrumental)	3:25
23.	"a) Sam's New Friend" (Spoken – Instrumental)	2:30
24.	"b) We Hope You're Feeling Better"	1:21
25.	"Chances Are #2"	1:36

2003 Bonus Track
No.	Title	Length
1.	"The Cross (Home #3)" (Live)	4:12

2015 Bonus Track
No.	Title	Length
1.	"Humble Stance" (Live)	5:58

== Personnel ==
Musicians

- Michael Sadler – lead vocals, pipe organ
- Ian Crichton – guitars
- Jim Gilmour – keyboards, backing vocals, clarinet
- Jim Crichton – bass
- Steve Negus – drums, percussion
- Mary Newland – backing vocals (24)

Players

- Jeremy / Michael Sadler
- Morty / Roger Sommers
- The Father (As a teenager & Mr. Monger) / Michael Sadler
- The Barker (At the carnival) / Steve Negus
- Jeremy's Sister / Penny Crichton
- The Orphanage Master / Michael Sadler
- The "80's" Ghosts / The Goodnight LA-Bv's
- The Amateur Show Host / Michael Sadler
- Sam's New Friend / Christopher Crichton
- Sam (On a good day) / Jim Gilmour
- Sam (On a bad day) / Roger Sommers
- Sarcastic Sam / Jim Crichton
- The Psychiatrist / Roger Sommers
- Java Joe / Jim Crichton

== Charts ==
Chart (1995)	Peak position
German Albums (Offizielle Top 100)	89
Swiss Albums (Schweizer Hitparade)	49
