= Full Circle (Saga album) =

Studio album by Saga
- Released: 1999 original, 20 May 2003
- Recorded: 1999
- Genre: Progressive rock
- Length: 49:43
- Label: SPV GmbH, Steamhammer Records, True North
- Producer: Jim Crichton

Saga chronology
Detours (1998)	Full Circle (1999)	House of Cards (2001)

Professional ratings
Review scores
Source	Rating
AllMusic	1.5/5 stars

Full Circle is a studio album by Saga, their thirteenth album of new material. This recording marks the beginning of the second round of Chapters.

== Track listing ==
All music is composed by Saga.

No.	Title	Length
1.	"Remember When (Chapter 9)"	5:20
2.	"The One"	4:21
3.	"Follow Me"	5:07
4.	"Uncle Albert's Eyes (Chapter 13)"	5:22
5.	"Home"	5:06
6.	"Don't Say Goodbye"	5:33
7.	"Time Bomb"	4:05
8.	"Not This Way (Chapter 10)"	5:04
9.	"A Night to Remember"	5:44
10.	"Goodbye"	3:59

== The Chapters ==
Three of the songs, "Remember When (Chapter 9)", "Uncle Albert's Eyes (Chapter 13)" and "Not This Way (Chapter 10)," are part of the second series of eight songs that Saga included within some of their albums called "The Chapters," which told the story of a young Albert Einstein. These songs were later included on the 2005 live album The Chapters Live that was recorded in 2003.

== Personnel ==
- Michael Sadler: Lead Vocals & Keyboards
- Jim Gilmour: Lead Keyboards & Vocals
- Ian Crichton: Lead Guitar & Acoustic
- Steve Negus: Drums & Percussion
- Jim Crichton: Bass, Keyboards & Acoustic Guitar

== Production ==
- Jim Crichton: Production & Mixing
- Penny Crichton: Artwork

== Charts ==
Chart (1999)	Peak position
German Albums (Offizielle Top 100)	44
