= Silent Knight (album) =

Studio album by Saga
- Released: August 1980
- Recorded: 1980
- Studios: Phase One Studios, Toronto, Canada
- Genres: Progressive rock; new wave
- Length: 37:11
- Labels: Maze (Canada); Polydor (Europe and Japan)
- Producer: Paul A. Gross

Saga chronology
Images at Twilight (1979)	Silent Knight (1980)	Worlds Apart (1981)

Professional ratings
Review scores
Source	Rating
AllMusic	2.5/5 stars

Silent Knight is the third studio album by the Canadian progressive rock band Saga and was originally released in August 1980. Silent Knight is certified Gold in Canada (50 000), having reached No. 42 in the charts. The Einstein Tower in Potsdam, Germany was used as a template for the album cover. Silent Knight marks the debut appearance of longtime keyboardist Jim Gilmour.

== The Chapters ==
Two of the songs, "Don't Be Late (Chapter Two)" and "Too Much to Lose (Chapter Seven)" were part of a series of eight (but later sixteen) songs that Saga included within their first four albums called "The Chapters", which told the story of a young Albert Einstein. These songs were later included on The Chapters Live (2005). To date, there's been no official compilation of the chapters in their studio incarnation.

== Track listing ==
All credits adapted from the original release.

Side one
No.	Title	Writer(s)	Length
1.	"Don't Be Late (Chapter Two)"	Ian Crichton, Jim Crichton, Michael Sadler	6:02
2.	"What's It Gonna Be?"	I. Crichton, J. Crichton, Jim Gilmour, Steve Negus, Sadler	4:27
3.	"Time to Go"	J. Crichton, Sadler	4:20
4.	"Compromise"	I. Crichton, J. Crichton, Gilmour, Negus, Sadler	3:20

Side two
No.	Title	Writer(s)	Length
5.	"Too Much to Lose (Chapter Seven)"	J. Crichton, Gilmour, Sadler	4:48
6.	"Help Me Out"	J. Crichton, Negus, Sadler	5:50
7.	"Someone Should"	J. Crichton, Gilmour, Sadler	4:06
8.	"Careful Where You Step"	J. Crichton, Sadler	4:18

2002 Multimedia bonus track
No.	Title	Length
1.	"Don't Be Late (Chapter Two)" (Live video)

== Personnel ==
Saga

- Michael Sadler – lead vocals, keyboards, bass guitar
- Ian Crichton – electric and acoustic guitars
- Jim Gilmour – keyboards, Moog synthesizers, vocoder, backing vocals
- Jim Crichton – bass guitar, synth bass, Moog Taurus bass synthesizer
- Steve Negus – drums, percussion

Production

- Paul Gross – producer
- Alan Thorne – engineer
- Mick Walsh – engineer
- Jeff Stobbs, Lenny Derose, Robin Brouwers – re-mixing assistant engineer
- Mark Wright – re-mixing engineer

== Charts ==
Chart (1980)	Peak position
Canada Top Albums/CDs (RPM)	42
Norwegian Albums (VG-lista)	15
Swedish Albums (Sverigetopplistan)	42

== Certifications ==
Region	Certification	Certified units/sales
Canada (Music Canada)	Gold	50,000^{^}
^{^} Shipments figures based on certification alone.
