= House of Cards (Saga album) =

Studio album by Saga
- Released: 12 February 2001
- Recorded: 2000
- Studio: Sound Image, Van Nuys, California
- Genre: Neo-prog
- Length: 49:54
- Label: Steamhammer
- Producer: Jim Crichton

Saga chronology
Full Circle (1999)	House of Cards (2001)	Marathon (2003)

Singles from House of Cards
- 1. "Money Talks" Released: 2001

House of Cards is the fourteenth studio album by the Canadian progressive rock band Saga, released on 12 February 2001 by Steamhammer. Recorded at Sound Image Studios in Van Nuys, Los Angeles, it was produced by bassist/keyboardist Jim Crichton.

== Track listing ==
All music is composed by Saga.

No.	Title	Length
1.	"God Knows"	5:29
2.	"The Runaway"	5:35
3.	"Always There"	3:52
4.	"Ashes to Ashes (Chapter 11)"	5:05
5.	"Once in a Lifetime"	4:21
6.	"So Good So Far [only on US and Japanese special edition]"	5:04
7.	"Only Human"	4:20
8.	"That's How We Like It"	4:49
9.	"Watching the Clock" (Instrumental)	1:39
10.	"We'll Meet Again (Chapter 15)"	5:58
11.	"Money Talks"	4:07
12.	"House of Cards"	4:20

== The Chapters ==
Two of the songs, "Ashes to Ashes (Chapter 11)" and "We'll Meet Again (Chapter 15)", were part of a second series of eight songs that Saga included within some of their albums called "The Chapters", which told the story of a young Albert Einstein. These songs were included on The Chapters Live a live album that the band released in 2005.

== Personnel ==
- Michael Sadler - lead and backing vocals, keyboards
- Ian Crichton - guitars, backing vocals
- Jim Gilmour - keyboards, backing and lead vocals
- Jim Crichton - bass, keyboards
- Steve Negus - drums, percussion

== Production ==
- Jim Crichton - Producer
- Eric Fulghum - Artwork

== Charts ==
Chart (2001)	Peak position
German Albums (Offizielle Top 100)	34
Swiss Albums (Schweizer Hitparade)	100
