= Sagacity (Saga album) =

Studio album by Saga
- Released: 27 June 2014
- Genre: Progressive rock
- Length: 50:44 (Special Edition: 102:08)
- Label: earMUSIC

Saga chronology
20/20 (2012)	Sagacity (2014)	Symmetry (2021)

Sagacity is the twenty-first studio album by Canadian rock band Saga. New drummer Mike Thorne made his studio debut on this album, after already playing live with the band following the release of 20/20, as recorded on the live album and video Spin It Again! Live in Munich.

The album title Sagacity is a play on words. Sagacity (the noun) means "The quality of being discerning, sound in judgment, and farsighted; wisdom".

Upon release, Sagacity charted #17 in Germany. A "Special Edition" was also released, containing 9 tracks recorded live at SWR1 Rock Arena during their 2013 tour.

== Track listing ==
All songs written by Saga.

No.	Title	Length
1.	"Let It Slide"	4:49
2.	"Vital Signs"	3:27
3.	"It Doesn't Matter (Who You Are)"	3:59
4.	"Go With the Flow"	5:26
5.	"Press 9"	3:48
6.	"Wake Up"	2:34
7.	"Don't Forget to Breathe"	3:24
8.	"The Further You Go"	4:04
9.	"On My Way"	5:15
10.	"No Two Sides"	3:58
11.	"Luck"	3:39
12.	"I'll Be"	6:21
Total length:		50:44

Special Edition Bonus Tracks (Live at SWR1 Rock Arena 2013)
No.	Title	Length
1.	"Careful Where You Step"	4:37
2.	"Mouse In a Maze"	5:50
3.	"You're Not Alone"	6:08
4.	"The Cross"	3:53
5.	"Scratching the Surface"	6:26
6.	"Humble Stance"	5:51
7.	"On the Loose"	5:07
8.	"Wind Him Up"	5:53
9.	"Don't Be Late (Chapter Two)"	7:35
Total length:		51:20

== Credits ==
- Michael Sadler – lead vocals
- Ian Crichton – electric and acoustic guitars
- Jim Gilmour – keyboards, backing and lead vocals
- Jim Crichton – bass guitar, keyboards
- Mike Thorne – drums, backing vocals

== Charts ==
Chart (2014)	Peak position
Belgian Albums (Ultratop Wallonia)	129
Dutch Albums (Album Top 100)	80
German Albums (Offizielle Top 100)	17
Swiss Albums (Schweizer Hitparade)	32
