= Pleasure & the Pain =

Studio album by Saga
- Released: June 3, 1997
- Recorded: 1997
- Genre: Alternative rock
- Length: 44:26
- Label: Polydor, Steamhammer Records
- Producer: Jim Crichton

Saga chronology
Generation 13 (1995)	Pleasure & the Pain (1997)	Phase 1 (1997)

Professional ratings
Review scores
Source	Rating
Allmusic	2.5/5 stars

Pleasure & the Pain is the twelfth studio album by Saga. It is the first and only album to feature Glen Sobel on drums.

== Track listing ==
All music is composed by Saga except where noted.

No.	Title	Writer(s)	Length
1.	"Heaven Can Wait"		6:16
2.	"How Do You Feel?"		4:07
3.	"Welcome to the Zoo"		4:31
4.	"Where's My Money?"	Raúl Mora	5:19
5.	"You're Not Alone '97"		4:20
6.	"Taxman" (The Beatles cover)	George Harrison	3:39
7.	"You Were Made for Me"		3:46
8.	"Gonna Give It to Ya"	Mora	3:57
9.	"Fantastically Wrong"		5:50
10.	"Pleasure and the Pain"		2:39

2002 Bonus Track
No.	Title	Length
1.	"Welcome to the Zoo" (Live)

2015 Bonus Tracks
No.	Title	Length
1.	"Time to Go" (Live)
2.	"You're Not Alone" (Live)

== Personnel ==
- Michael Sadler – lead vocals
- Ian Crichton – guitars
- Jim Gilmour – keyboards, vocals
- Glen Sobel – drums
- Jim Crichton – bass

== Charts ==
Chart (1997)	Peak position
German Albums (Offizielle Top 100)	93
