= Worlds Apart (Saga album) =

Studio album by Saga
- Released: September 1981
- Recorded: 1981
- Studios: The Farmyard (Little Chalfont, Buckinghamshire, England)
- Genres: Progressive rock; new wave
- Length: 43:38
- Label: Maze Records / Polydor / Portrait / CBS / Epic / CBS Discos
- Producer: Rupert Hine

Saga chronology
Silent Knight (1980)	Worlds Apart (1981)	In Transit (1982)

US/Alternative cover

Professional ratings
Review scores
Source	Rating
AllMusic	4/5 stars

Worlds Apart is the fourth studio album by Canadian neo-prog band Saga and was originally released in 1981 and the USA 1982. The album was produced by Rupert Hine and has been released with several different covers. Frontman Michael Sadler stated in the band's video DVD Silhouette (2002) that Hine told him to stop "singing like a choir boy". Sadler's vocal style was noticeably different on Worlds Apart than on the first three Saga albums as he kept that style in successive performances with the band. Hine reportedly had Sadler climb to the rafter of the English barn where the band was recording in order to get the proper emotion from Sadler for "On the Loose".

== Success ==
Widely considered Saga's best album (and certainly their most commercially successful), the album has become the band's most recognizable work to date. The first song on the album, "On the Loose" was a single that hit No. 26 on the Billboard Hot 100 and No. 3 on the Top Rock Tracks chart in late 1982 and early 1983, their highest chart performance. The single was helped by a music video which appeared on MTV during the station's inaugural year on the air. Videos were also made for the singles "Wind Him Up" (#22 Canada) and "Amnesia". The success of the album was also largely credited to an expanded tour schedule which saw the band enter new territories and venues, particularly in the United States where they opened for Billy Squier and Jethro Tull, to expand their musical presence. Worlds Apart has been certified Platinum in Canada (100,000) and Gold in Germany (250,000), Denmark (50,000), United States (500,000), and Norway (15,000). The album was released on Maze Records in Canada, Portrait CBS Records in America and England, and Polydor Records for the remainder of the global market.

== The Chapters ==
Two of the songs, "No Regrets (Chapter V)" and "No Stranger (Chapter VIII)", were part of a series of eight (but later sixteen) songs that Saga included within their first four albums called "The Chapters", which told the story of a young Albert Einstein. The release of these two chapters completed the original set of eight. These songs were also later included on The Chapters Live (2005). To date, there has been no official compilation of the chapters in their studio incarnation.

== Worlds Apart Revisited ==
In 2007, Saga released Worlds Apart Revisited (2005), a double-CD live album that included all the songs from the original Worlds Apart album.

== Track listing ==
Side One
No.	Title	Lyrics	Music	Length
1.	"On the Loose"	Michael Sadler	Saga	4:12
2.	"Wind Him Up"	Jim Crichton	Saga	5:47
3.	"Amnesia"	J. Crichton	Saga	3:16
4.	"Framed"	Sadler	Saga	5:42
5.	"Time's Up"	Sadler	Saga	4:12

Side Two
No.	Title	Lyrics	Music	Length
6.	"The Interview"	Sadler	J. Crichton, Sadler	3:52
7.	"No Regrets (Chapter Five)"	J. Crichton	J. Crichton, Sadler	4:46
8.	"Conversations"	J. Crichton, Sadler	Saga	4:46
9.	"No Stranger (Chapter Eight)"	J. Crichton	J. Crichton, Sadler	7:05

== Note ==
- The track order shown above is for the original vinyl LP release. Later CD releases and the Canadian vinyl pressing on Maze Records have "Time's Up" as track #2, followed by "Wind Him Up", "Amnesia", and "Framed" in positions #3, #4 and #5, respectively. Some CD releases listed the tracks in the original LP order, meaning tracks #2 through #5 were mislabelled.
- On the Portrait version of Worlds Apart, the spoken intro of "Amnesia" is missing. The intro is sampled from the Tom & Jerry cartoon "Nitty Witty Kitty": "It say here, a sharp blow on the head is a sure cure for amnesia, and that's what he's gonna get!"
- The album was released internationally. In some markets it was released on Polydor Records, and in South America, Mexico and other Latin American markets it was released by CBS Records, Epic Records and CBS Discos.

== Personnel ==
Saga:

- Michael Sadler – lead vocals (all but track 7), Moog synthesizer, keyboards
- Ian Crichton – guitar
- Jim Gilmour – lead synthesizer, keyboards, lead vocal on track 7, backing vocals, clarinet
- Jim Crichton – bass guitar, Yamaha electric grand piano, Moog bass synthesizer, keyboards
- Steve Negus – acoustic & electronic drums, percussion

Production:

- Produced by Rupert Hine
- Recorded & engineered by Stephen W Tayler
- Assistant engineers: Ian Morais & David Rolfe
- Mastered by Bob Ludwig

== Charts ==
=== Weekly charts ===
Chart (1982)	Peak position
Canada Top Albums/CDs (RPM)	22
German Albums (Offizielle Top 100)	9
Norwegian Albums (VG-lista)	5
Swedish Albums (Sverigetopplistan)	33
US Billboard 200	29

=== Year-end charts ===
Chart (1982)	Position
German Albums (Offizielle Top 100)	15

== Certifications ==
Region	Certification	Certified units/sales
Canada (Music Canada)	Gold	50,000^{^}
Germany (BVMI)	Gold	250,000^{^}
United States (RIAA)	Gold	500,000^{^}
^{^} Shipments figures based on certification alone.
