= Steve Negus =

Canadian drummer, songwriter

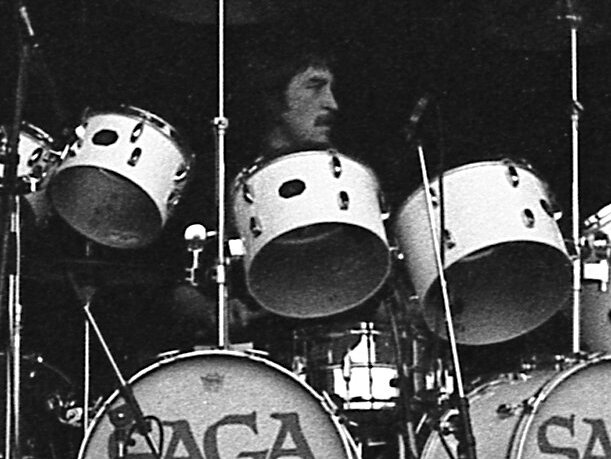
- Negus performing with Saga in 1981

Background information
- Born: February 19, 1952 (age 74); Hamilton, Ontario, Canada
- Origin: Grimsby, Ontario, Canada
- Genres: Progressive rock
- Occupation: Drummer
- Years active: 1972 – present
- Website: stevenegus.com

Stephen William Negus (born February 19, 1952) is a Canadian drummer, songwriter, who was a member of the progressive rock band Saga for twenty-six years. In the late 1980s, he and keyboardist Jim Gilmour left Saga and formed GNP (Gilmour Negus Project).

== Biography ==
While playing at Larry's Hideaway, a club in Toronto, Steve Negus' drumming came to the attention of the Canadian rock band, Fludd. The band was searching for a new drummer, and offered Steve the job that night. Several weeks later Steve joined Fludd as their new drummer.

While in Fludd, Steve Negus met bassist Jim Crichton and keyboardist Peter Rochon, who would later join him as founding members of Pockets, the original working name of Saga. Brian and Ed Pilling were the creative force behind Fludd, and about a year after Steve joined, Brian was stricken with leukemia and the band couldn't continue to perform.

A new band, Pockets, was formed out of Fludd's rhythm section. Negus, Crichton, and Rochon went into eight months of rehearsal to form the new band with Jim Crichton's younger brother Ian Crichton on guitar and Michael Sadler as the singer. They changed their name to Saga a year later.

With Saga, Negus earned many gold and platinum selling CDs in Europe, Canada, and the U.S. In 1981, the band went to England to work with Rupert Hine as producer, and Worlds Apart was recorded at Farmyard Studios. Producer Hine also had Steve play drums on Chris de Burgh's album, The Getaway. "Don't Pay the Ferryman" was the single from that album, which went to #34 on the Billboard Hot 100 chart in the United States and #32 in Canada. The Getaway went to number one on the German charts, followed by Saga's own Worlds Apart at number two.

In the late 1980s, Negus and keyboardist Jim Gilmour left Saga and formed GNP (Gilmour Negus Project) with singer Robert Bevan for Virgin Records. The CD Safety Zone which was produced by Negus came out in 1989. Before a follow-up CD could be written and recorded, Negus and Gilmour reunited with Saga which ended GNP. In 2003, Negus left Saga once again.

In 2007, Negus released his first true solo project Dare to Dream through Cyclone Records. Steve Negus also co-produced and engineered songs for Jaclyn Kenyon on her original songs "Whatcha Gonna Do" and "See it Through me" in 2009.

== Discography ==
=== with Saga ===
- Saga (1978)
- Images at Twilight (1979)
- Silent Knight (1980)
- Worlds Apart (1981)
- Heads or Tales (1983)
- Behaviour (1985)
- The Security of Illusion (1993)
- Steel Umbrellas (1994)
- Generation 13 (1995)
- Full Circle (1999)
- House of Cards (2001)
- Marathon (2003)

=== with Chris de Burgh ===
- The Getaway (1982)

=== with GNP ===
- Safety Zone (1989)

=== with Negus ===
- Dare to Dream (2008)
- Economy of Motion (2023)

=== Guest appearances ===
- "One Mans Poison" (from the Rupert Hine album, Waving Not Drowning) (1982)
- "Charlene", "I Can't Touch You" (from the Top Dead Centre album, Take Another Breath) (2012)

== See also ==
- Canadian rock
- List of bands from Canada
- Music of Canada
