= The Fixx discography =

- Studio albums: 11
- Live albums: 4
- Compilation albums: 10
- Singles: 32
- Video albums: 3

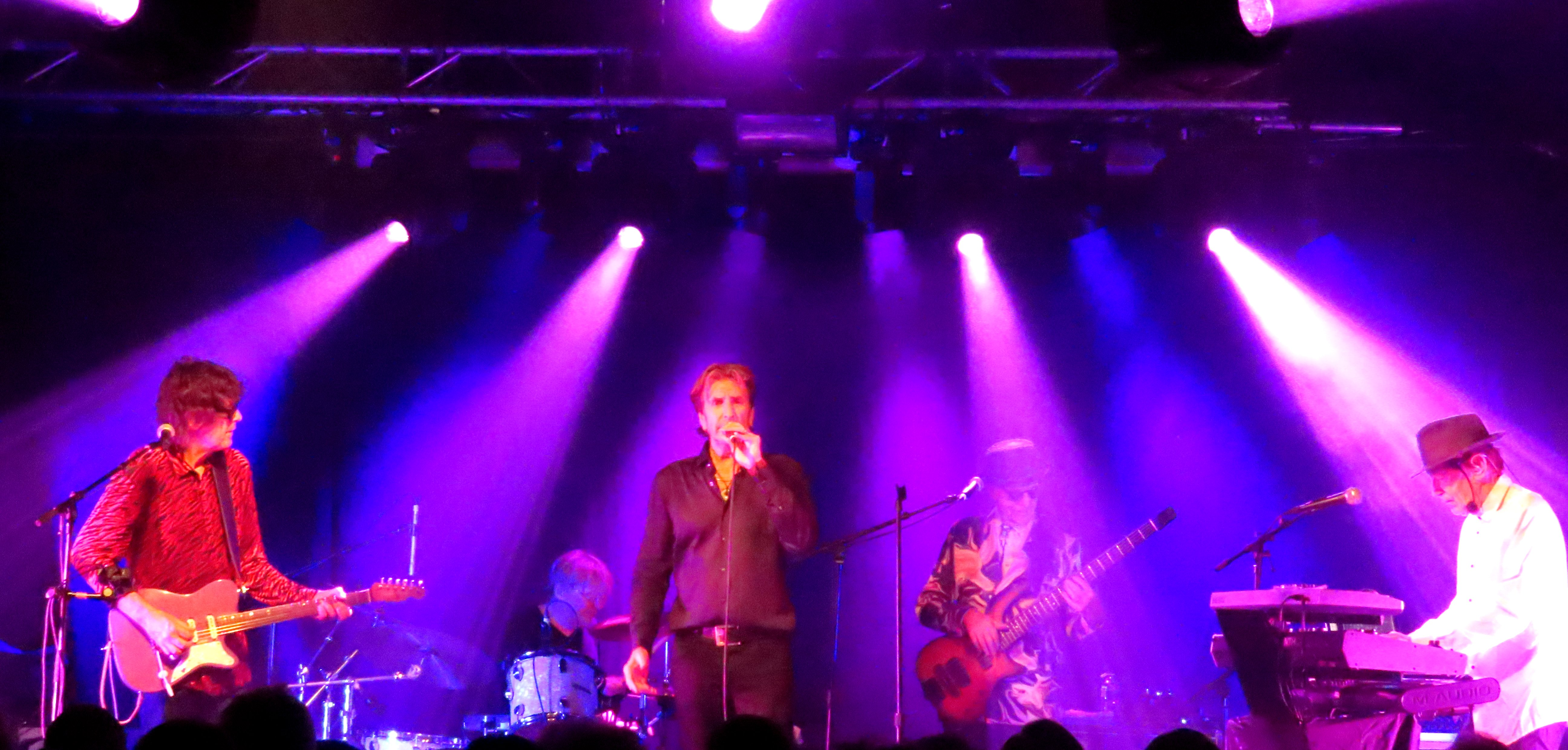
The Fixx performing in 2024

This is the discography of the English new wave band The Fixx.

== Albums ==
=== Studio albums ===
Title	Album details	Peak chart positions								Certifications
Title	Album details	UK	AUS	CAN	GER	NL	NZ	SWE	US	Certifications
Shuttered Room	Released: 14 May 1982; Label: MCA; Formats: LP, MC	54	77	52	—	—	—	—	106	
Reach the Beach	Released: 13 May 1983; Label: MCA; Formats: LP, MC, 8-track	91	68	8	—	38	28	37	8	CAN: Platinum; US: Platinum
Phantoms	Released: 14 August 1984; Label: MCA; Formats: CD, LP, MC, 8-track	—	—	18	59	41	21	—	19	CAN: Gold; US: Gold
Walkabout	Released: 19 May 1986; Label: MCA; Formats: CD, LP, MC	—	99	26	—	—	—	—	30	
Calm Animals	Released: 6 February 1989; Label: RCA; Formats: CD, LP, MC	—	—	36	—	—	—	—	72	
Ink.	Released: 19 February 1991; Label: Impact; Formats: CD, LP, MC	—	—	49	—	—	—	—	111	
Elemental	Released: 7 April 1998; Label: CMC International; Formats: CD, MC	—	—	—	—	—	—	—	—	
1011 Woodland	Released: 1 June 1999; Label: CMC International, Sanctuary; Formats: 2xCD	—	—	—	—	—	—	—	—	
Want That Life	Released: 23 September 2003; Label: Rainman; Formats: CD	—	—	—	—	—	—	—	—	
Beautiful Friction	Released: 17 July 2012; Label: Kirtland; Formats: CD, LP, digital download	—	—	—	—	—	—	—	—	
Every Five Seconds	Released: 3 June 2022; Label: BFD/The Orchard; Formats: CD, 2xLP, digital download	—	—	—	—	—	—	—	—	
"—" denotes releases that did not chart or were not released in that territory.

=== Live albums ===
Title	Album details	Peak chart positions
Title	Album details	US
React	Released: 22 June 1987; Label: MCA; Formats: CD, LP, MC; Includes three new studio tracks and a remake of Red Skies	110
In Concert	Released: 27 February 1996; Label: King Biscuit Flower Hour; Formats: CD	—
Real Time Stood Still	Released: 1996; Label: Repertoire; Formats: CD	—
Live at Rockpalast	Released: 1 April 2014; Label: Repertoire; Formats: CD+DVD	—
"—" denotes releases that did not chart or were not released in that territory.

=== Compilation albums ===
Title	Album details
Greatest Hits – One Thing Leads to Another	Released: 25 September 1989; Label: MCA; Formats: CD, LP, MC
Missing Links	Released: 16 September 1994; Label: R'n'D; Formats: CD
Ultimate Collection	Released: 9 November 1999; Label: Hip-O; Formats: CD
Elemental + 1011 Woodland	Released: 1999; Label: SPV GmbH; Formats: 3xCD
20th Century Masters – The Millennium Collection: The Best of the Fixx	Released: 17 October 2000; Label: MCA; Formats: CD
Extended Versions: The Encore Collection	Released: 7 November 2000; Label: BMG; Formats: CD; Contains re-recordings and live versions of selected tracks from 1011 Woodland
Happy Landings and Lost Tracks	Released: 11 December 2001; Label: Beyond/Rainman; Formats: CD
Then and Now	Released: 8 October 2002; Label: CMC International; Formats: CD; Contains tracks from Elemental and 1011 Woodland
Stage One	Released: 2004; Label: JARC; Formats: CD; Limited release containing new versions of hits and album tracks
The Twenty-Fifth Anniversary Anthology	Released: 24 January 2006; Label: Rainman; Formats: 2xCD

=== Video albums ===
Title	Album details
Live in the USA	Released: August 1985; Label: MCA; Formats: VHS
20th Century Masters – The DVD Collection: The Best of the Fixx	Released: 8 June 2004; Label: Geffen; Formats: DVD
Stage Two – In the Public Eye	Released: 2005; Label: JARC; Formats: DVD; Limited release

== Singles ==
Title	Year	Peak chart positions								Album
Title	Year	UK	AUS	CAN	NL	US	US Alt	US Dance	US Main	Album
"Little Women" (as the Portraits)	1979	—	—	—	—	—	—	—	—	Non-album singles
"Hazards in the Home" (as the Portraits)	1980	—	—	—	—	—	—	—	—	Non-album singles
"Lost Planes" (as the Fix)	1981	—	—	—	—	—	—	—	—	Shuttered Room
"Some People"	1982	—	—	—	—	—	—	—	—	Shuttered Room
"Stand or Fall"	1982	54	33	37	—	76	—	—	7	Shuttered Room
"Red Skies"	1982	57	—	—	44	101	—	—	13	Shuttered Room
"Saved by Zero"	1983	101	98	45	—	20	—	—	9	Reach the Beach
"One Thing Leads to Another"	1983	86	38	1	—	4	—	14	2	Reach the Beach
"The Sign of Fire"	1983	—	—	—	—	32	—	—	20	Reach the Beach
"Deeper and Deeper" (promo-only release)	1984	—	—	—	—	—	—	47	3	Streets of Fire soundtrack
"Less Cities, More Moving People"	1984	—	—	—	—	—	—	68	—	Phantoms
"Are We Ourselves?"	1984	—	—	29	—	15	—	—	1	Phantoms
"Sunshine in the Shade"	1984	—	—	—	—	69	—	—	37	Phantoms
"I Will"	1985	—	—	—	—	—	—	—	—	Phantoms
"Treasure It"	1986	—	—	—	—	—	—	—	—	Walkabout
"Secret Separation"	1986	83	—	49	—	19	—	—	1	Walkabout
"Built for the Future"	1986	—	—	—	—	—	—	—	13	Walkabout
"Don't Be Scared" (promo-only release)	1987	—	—	—	—	—	—	—	32	React
"Red Skies" (re-recording)	1987	—	—	—	—	—	—	—	—	React
"Driven Out"	1989	—	123	41	—	55	11	—	1	Calm Animals
"Precious Stone"	1989	—	—	78	—	—	—	—	23	Calm Animals
"How Much Is Enough"	1991	—	119	27	—	35	10	—	11	Ink.
"Crucified"	1991	—	—	—	—	—	—	—	—	Ink.
"No One Has to Cry" (cassette & promo-only release)	1991	—	—	—	—	— (Note: "No One Has to Cry" did not enter the Billboard Hot 100, but did peak at number 85 on the Cash Box Top 100.)	—	—	—	Ink.
"Two Different Views"	1998	—	—	—	—	—	—	—	—	Elemental
"One Thing Leads to Another" (J. Benitez remix)	2000	—	—	—	—	—	—	54 (Note: The 2000 "One Thing Leads to Another" remix was listed as No. 4 on the Top 5 Dance/Clubplay Breakouts List. This list features tracks with future potential to hit the Top 50 and can be considered a Bubbling Under chart for the Top 50.)	—	Non-album single
"Elected"	2000	—	—	—	—	—	—	—	—	Happy Landings and Lost Tracks
"Anyone Else"	2012	—	—	—	—	—	—	—	—	Beautiful Friction
"Shaman"	2013	—	—	—	—	—	—	—	—	Beautiful Friction
"Wake Up"	2021	—	—	—	—	—	—	—	—	Every Five Seconds
"Woman of Flesh and Blood"	2022	—	—	—	—	—	—	—	—	Every Five Seconds
"Closer"	2022	—	—	—	—	—	—	—	—	Every Five Seconds
"—" denotes releases that did not chart or were not released in that territory.
