= Ultimate Collection (The Fixx album) =

Compilation album by the Fixx
- Released: 9 November 1999
- Genre: New wave, rock
- Length: 72:29
- Label: Hip-O Records

The Fixx chronology
| 1011 Woodland (1999) | Ultimate Collection (1999) | Want That Life (2003) |

Professional ratings
Review scores
| Source | Rating |
|---|---|
| AllMusic | 4.5/5 stars |

Ultimate Collection is a compilation of songs by the band the Fixx released by Hip-O Records on 9 November 1999. It is largely a collection of singles; many tracks appear as they did on their respective 7" releases. It also has two B-sides and one recording pulled from the rare Happy Landings EP, which makes it stand out from other greatest hits collections. This is the only Fixx collection to use the original recordings of all tracks.

== Track listing ==
1. "Stand or Fall" – 4:00
2. "Red Skies" – 4:20
3. "Lost Planes" – 3:19
4. "Some People" – 3:00
  - Tracks 1–4 from Shuttered Room
5. "Saved by Zero" – 3:23 (single edit)
6. "One Thing Leads to Another" – 3:24 (single mix)
7. "The Sign of Fire" – 3:51
  - Tracks 5–7 from Reach the Beach
8. "Going Overboard" – 3:16
  - B-side to "Saved by Zero"
9. "Deeper and Deeper [long version]" – 6:29
  - From the soundtrack to the motion picture Streets of Fire, this version appeared on the B-side to "Are We Ourselves?".
10. "Are We Ourselves?" – 2:28
11. "Sunshine in the Shade" – 2:26
12. "Less Cities, More Moving People" – 3:35 (single edit)
  - Tracks 10–12 from Phantoms
13. "A Letter to Both Sides" – 3:19
  - From the soundtrack to the motion picture Fletch
14. "Secret Separation" – 3:49
15. "Built for the Future" – 3:54 (single edit)
  - Tracks 14 & 15 from Walkabout
16. "Driven Out" – 3:58 (From Calm Animals)
17. "How Much Is Enough" – 3:50 (single edit)
18. "No One Has to Cry" – 4:01
  - Tracks 17 & 18 from Ink
19. "Two Different Views" – 5:49 (From the Happy Landings EP)
