= Stephen W Tayler =

British audio engineer

- Born: Stephen W Tayler; 20 September 1953 (age 73); Buckinghamshire, United Kingdom
- Genre: Rock
- Occupations: audio engineer; record producer
- Years active: 1974–present
- Website: stephentayler.com

Stephen W Tayler (born 20 September 1953) is a prolific British record producer and audio engineer, known for his long association with producer Rupert Hine and for having worked on albums by artists such as Kate Bush, The Fixx, Howard Jones, and Rush.

== Selected discography ==
Year	Artist	Album	Role	Notes
1976	Brand X	Unorthodox Behaviour	Tape operator	Credited as Steve Taylor
1976	Tommy Bolin	Private Eyes	Engineer, Mixer	
1976	Gong	Gazeuse!	Engineer, Mixer	
1977	Brand X	Moroccan Roll	Engineer, Mixer	
1978	Bruford	Feels Good to Me	Engineer	
1978	U.K.	U.K.	Engineer, Mixer	
1979	Bruford	One of a Kind	Engineer, Production assistant	
1981	Rupert Hine	Immunity	Engineer, Mixer, Co-producer	
1981	Saga	Worlds Apart	Engineer	
1982	The Fixx	Shuttered Room	Engineer	
1982	Rupert Hine	Waving Not Drowning	Engineer, Mixer, Co-producer	
1983	The Fixx	Reach the Beach	Engineer, Mixer	
1983	Rupert Hine	The Wildest Wish to Fly	Engineer, Mixer, Co-producer, Performer	Credited with woodwinds
1983	Saga	Heads or Tales	Engineer, Mixer	
1984	Howard Jones	Human's Lib	Engineer, Mixer, Performer	Credited with saxophone
1984	Honeymoon Suite	Honeymoon Suite	Mixer	
1984	Tina Turner	Private Dancer	Engineer, Mixer	"I Might Have Been Queen" and "Better Be Good to Me" only
1984	The Fixx	Phantoms	Engineer, Mixer	
1985	Howard Jones	Dream into Action	Engineer, Mixer	
1986	Honeymoon Suite	The Big Prize	Mixer	
1986	The Fixx	Walkabout	Engineer, Mixer	
1987	Thompson Twins	Close to the Bone	Engineer, Mixer	
1987	Jethro Tull	Crest of a Knave	Engineer, Mixer	
1989	Stevie Nicks	The Other Side of the Mirror (album)	Engineer, Mixer	
1989	Rush	Presto	Engineer, Mixer	
1991	The Fixx	Ink	Engineer, Mixer	"All the Best Things" only
1991	Rush	Roll the Bones	Engineer, Mixer	
1996	Duncan Sheik	Duncan Sheik	Mixer	
1996	Howard Jones	Live Acoustic America	Mixer	
2001	Suzanne Vega	Songs in Red and Gray	Engineer, Mixer	
2010	Kate Bush	Director's Cut	Mixer	
2011	Kate Bush	50 Words for Snow	Engineer, Mixer	
2012	The Fixx	Beautiful Friction	Mixer	
2016	Kate Bush	Before the Dawn	Engineer, Mixer	
2021	Van der Graaf Generator	Still Life	Engineer	2021 remaster of 1976 release
2022	The Fixx	Every Five Seconds	Producer, Engineer, Mixer	
2023	Camel	Nude	Engineer	2023 remaster of 1981 release
