= 1011 Woodland =

Studio album by the Fixx
- Released: 1 June 1999
- Recorded: 1–7 March 1999
- Studio: Woodland (Nashville, Tennessee)
- Genre: New wave Pop rock
- Length: 86:48
- Label: CMC
- Producer: The Fixx

The Fixx chronology
Elemental (1998)	1011 Woodland (1999)	Want That Life (2003)

Professional ratings
Review scores
Source	Rating
Allmusic	2/5 stars

1011 Woodland is the eighth studio album by British new wave band the Fixx, released by CMC International Records in the US on 1 June 1999. The album was released in the UK by Sanctuary Records in 2001. All but the last three tracks are re-recordings of previous songs done by the band, largely in an acoustic and modern form. The final three tracks are live recordings.

== Track listing ==
1. "Driven Out" (Dan K. Brown, Cy Curnin, Rupert Greenall, Jamie West-Oram, Adam Woods) – 6:14
2. "Stand or Fall" (Charlie Barrett, Curnin, Greenall, West-Oram) – 5:29
3. "Woman on a Train" (Brown, Curnin, Greenall, Jeannette Obstoj, West-Oram, Woods) – 6:35
4. "Outside" (Alfie Agius, Curnin, Greenal, West-Oram, Woods) – 8:33
5. "Secret Separation" (Brown, Curnin, Greenall, Obstoj, West-Oram, Wood) – 5:38
6. "Cameras in Paris" (Barrett, Curnin, Greenall, West-Oram) – 5:11
7. "Wish" (Brown, Curnin, Greenall, West-Oram, Woods) – 5:58
8. "One Jungle" (The Fixx) – 3:32
9. "I Will" (Brown, Curnin, Greenall, West-Oram, Woods) – 4:36
10. "Saved by Zero" (Agius, Curnin, Greenal, West-Oram, Woods) – 5:53
11. "Lost Planes" (Barrett, Curnin, Greenall, West-Oram) – 3:25
12. "Precious Stone" (The Fixx, Woods) – 4:36
13. "Still Around" (The Fixx) – 4:55
14. "Two Different Views" (Curnin, Greenall, West-Oram, Woods) – 3:35
15. "Red Skies" (Barrett, Curnin, Greenall, West-Oram, Woods) – 4:42
16. "One Thing Leads to Another" (Agius, Curnin, Greenall, West-Oram, Woods) – 3:23
17. "Deeper and Deeper" (Curnin, West-Oram) – 4:33

== Personnel ==
The Fixx

- Cy Curnin – vocals
- Rupert Greenall – keyboards
- Jamie West-Oram – guitars
- Chris Tait – bass
- Adam Woods – drums

Additional personnel

- Jannelle Guillot – voiceover

== Production ==
- Joey Gmereck – executive producer
- Martin Stainton – executive producer
- The Fixx – producers
- Chris Stone – engineer
- Tye Bellar – assistant engineer
- John Zajdel – assistant engineer
- Woodland Studios (Nashville, Tennessee) – recording location
- Martin Rex – mixing at Strongroom Studios (London, UK)
- Allen Rantz – live recording assistant
- Jeff Stevens – live recording assistant
- Joe Winner – live recording assistant
- Stephen Marcussen – mastering at Precision Mastering (Hollywood, California)
- Melinda Pepler – production coordination
- Randy Glenn – quality control
- Lee Chambers – video director
- Dan Russo – art direction
- Jena Petsch – design
- Dave Rogers – photography
- Cy Curnin – liner notes
