= What's Love Got to Do with It (album) =

1993 soundtrack album / studio album by Tina Turner

Soundtrack album by Tina Turner
- Released: June 15, 1993
- Recorded: 1984; 1993
- Studio: Record Plant
- Genres: Rock; R&B; pop; soul
- Length: 57:32 (international version); 51:52 (US version)
- Label: Parlophone

Tina Turner chronology
Simply the Best (1991)	What's Love Got to Do with It (1993)	The Collected Recordings: Sixties to Nineties (1994)

Singles from What's Love Got to Do with It
- 1. "I Don't Wanna Fight" Released: April 23, 1993; 2. "Disco Inferno" Released: July 12, 1993; 3. "Why Must We Wait Until Tonight" Released: September 16, 1993; 4. "Proud Mary" Released: November 19, 1993

Professional ratings
Review scores
Source	Rating
AllMusic	3/5 stars
Robert Christgau	A−
Entertainment Weekly	B−
Music Week	4/5 stars
Philadelphia Inquirer	2.5/4 stars

What's Love Got to Do with It is the first soundtrack by American singer Tina Turner, released on June 15, 1993, by Parlophone. It served as the soundtrack album for the 1993 Tina Turner biographical film of the same name, which was released by Touchstone Pictures that same year. It mostly consists of re-recorded versions of her greatest hits during her period with the Ike and Tina Revue. In celebration of the 30th anniversary of What's Love Got to Do with It, the album was re-released on April 26, 2024, with remixes, single edits and rarities.

== Overview ==
Most of the album is re-recorded songs from the Ike & Tina Turner period including their first successful single, "A Fool in Love". A total of five new tracks were recorded. Three all new tracks were also included—"I Don't Wanna Fight", a top-10 entry in both the US and UK, and her last major American chart success, as well as "Why Must We Wait Until Tonight" and "Stay Awhile". The album also includes a new Turner version of the Trammps' disco classic "Disco Inferno", a song she had often performed live in concert during the late 1970s, but which she had never previously recorded in studio. It also includes a new Turner version of "You Know I Love You" which is not the B.B. King song but a slightly different, more blues rock song Turner wrote herself with her bandmates, though she still credited the song to King on the soundtrack. Turner recalls singing the B.B. King ballad in her 1986 memoir, I, Tina. Two tracks from her 1984 breakthrough solo album Private Dancer are included as well—the title track to the film and "I Might Have Been Queen". The album hit number one on the UK Albums Chart and was certified platinum in various countries including the US, the UK, Switzerland and New Zealand.

The US version of the album omits two tracks; "Shake a Tail Feather" and "Tina's Wish", the latter being Turner's version of "Make Me Over" from the 1973 album Nutbush City Limits.

== Track listings ==
All tracks produced by Chris Lord-Alge, Tina Turner and Roger Davies, except "Why Must We Wait Until Tonight" produced by Bryan Adams and Robert John "Mutt" Lange, "I Might Have Been Queen" produced by Rupert Hine and "What's Love Got to Do with It" produced by Terry Britten.

What's Love Got to Do with It track listing
No.	Title	Writer(s)	Length
1.	"I Don't Wanna Fight"	Steve DuBerry; Lulu; Billy Lawrie	6:09
2.	"Rock Me Baby"	B. B. King; Joe Josea	3:59
3.	"Disco Inferno"	Leroy Green; Ron Kersey	4:05
4.	"Why Must We Wait Until Tonight"	Adams; Lange	5:55
5.	"Stay Awhile"	Britten; Graham Lyle	4:52
6.	"Nutbush City Limits"	T. Turner	3:19
7.	"(Darlin') You Know I Love You"	King; Jules Taub	4:29
8.	"Proud Mary"	John Fogerty	5:27
9.	"A Fool in Love"	Ike Turner	2:56
10.	"It's Gonna Work Out Fine"	Sylvia McKinney; Rose McCoy	2:50
11.	"Shake a Tail Feather"	Verlie Rice; Otis Hayes; Andre Williams	2:32
12.	"I Might Have Been Queen"	Hine; Jeannette Obstoj; Jamie West-Oram	4:20
13.	"What's Love Got to Do with It"	Britten; Lyle	3:46
14.	"Tina's Wish"	T. Turner; I. Turner	3:08
Total length:			57:32

30th anniversary edition bonus disc
No.	Title	Writer(s)	Length
1.	"I Don't Wanna Fight" (single edit)	DuBerry; Lulu; Lawrie	4:25
2.	"Disco Inferno" (7" edit)	Green; Kersey	3:50
3.	"Why Must We Wait Until Tonight" (7" single edit)	Adams; Lange	4:27
4.	"Proud Mary" (edit)	Fogerty	4:08
5.	"I Don't Wanna Fight" (urban mix)	DuBerry; Lulu; Lawrie	5:16
6.	"Disco Inferno" (12" version)	Green; Kersey	5:34
7.	"Why Must We Wait Until Tonight" (Tony Dofat remix)	Adams; Lange	5:20
8.	"I Don't Wanna Fight" (holiday inn longue mix)	DuBerry; Lulu; Lawrie	5:43
9.	"I Don't Wanna Fight" (clubhouse mix)	DuBerry; Lulu; Lawrie	5:27
10.	"Why Must We Wait Until Tonight" (Tony Dofat 7" edit)	Adams; Lange	4:13
11.	"I Don't Wanna Fight" (Jerry Moran dance mix)	DuBerry; Lulu; Lawrie	4:39
12.	"Why Must We Wait Until Tonight" (instrumental)	Adams; Lange	5:21
13.	"I Don't Wanna Fight" (urban radio instrumental)	DuBerry; Lulu; Lawrie	4:04
14.	"Disco Inferno" (12" dub)	Green; Kersey	6:58
15.	"Why Must We Wait Until Tonight" (acapella)	Adams; Lange	4:27
16.	"Proud Mary" (acapella)	Fogerty	4:44

== Personnel ==
=== Musicians ===
- Tina Turner – lead vocals, backing vocals (1, 12)
- Steve DuBerry – keyboards (1), drum programming (1), backing vocals (1)
- C.J. Vanston – keyboards (1, 2, 3, 5–9, 11, 14), drum programming (1, 5), strings (4)
- David Paich – acoustic piano (4)
- Robbie King – Hammond B3 organ (4)
- Steve McNamara – programming (4)
- Rupert Hine – keyboards (12), bass (12), percussion programming (12), backing vocals (12)
- Nick Glennie-Smith – keyboards (13)
- Billy Livsey – keyboards (13)
- Gene Black – guitars (1, 3, 5–9, 11, 14), lead guitar (2)
- James Ralston – guitars (1, 2, 3, 5–11, 14), backing vocals (3)
- Keith Scott – guitars (4)
- Tim Pierce – guitar solo (5)
- Jamie West-Oram – guitars (12)
- Terry Britten – guitars (13), backing vocals (13)
- Bob Feit – bass (2, 3, 6–11, 14)
- Curt Bisquera – drums (1, 2, 3, 5–11, 14)
- Trevor Morais – drums (12)
- Graham Jarvis – drums (13)
- Simon Morton – percussion (13)
- Tim Cappello – saxophone (1, 2, 3, 6–9, 11, 14), backing vocals (1, 3), horn arrangements (5), bass vocals (8), featured vocals (10)
- Lee Thornburg – trombone (1, 3, 6, 8, 11, 14), trumpet (1, 3, 6, 8, 11, 14)
- Rick Braun – trumpet solo (4)
- Aaron Zigman – string arrangements (1, 5)
- Sharon Brown – backing vocals (2, 3, 6, 9, 10, 11, 14)
- Jackie Gouche – backing vocals (2, 3, 6, 9, 10, 11, 14)
- Jean McClain – backing vocals (2, 3, 6, 9, 10, 11, 14)
- The Tuck Back Twins (Bryan Adams and Mutt Lange) – backing vocals (4)
- Laurence Fishburne – spoken vocals (8, 10) (film versions only, not on the released soundtrack)
- Cy Curnin – backing vocals (12)
- Tessa Niles – backing vocals (13)

=== Production ===
- Roger Davies – executive producer, producer (1, 2, 3, 5–11, 14)
- Tina Turner – executive producer, liner notes, producer (2, 3, 5–11, 14)
- Chris Lord-Alge – producer (1, 2, 3, 5–11, 14), engineer (1, 2, 3, 5–11, 14), mixing (1–11, 14), remixing (12)
- Steve DuBerry – additional producer (1)
- Bryan Adams – producer (4)
- Robert John "Mutt" Lange – producer (4)
- Rupert Hine – producer (12)
- Terry Britten – producer (13)
- Steve McNamara – engineer (4)
- Ron Obvious – engineer (4)
- John Hudson – engineer (12), mixing (12)
- Bill Leonard – assistant engineer (1, 2, 3, 5–11, 14)
- Talley Sherwood – assistant engineer (1–11, 14)
- Ben Wallach – assistant engineer (1–11, 14)
- Doug Sax – mastering
- Norman Moore – art direction, design
- Peter Lindbergh – photography
- Herb Ritts – photography

Studios

- Recorded at Record Plant (Los Angeles, California); Battery Studios and Mayfair Studios (London, UK); Farmyard Studios (Buckinghamshire, England); The Warehouse Studio (Vancouver, British Columbia, Canada).
- Overdubbed and Mixed at Image Recording Studios (Los Angeles, California).
- Mastered at The Mastering Lab (Hollywood, California).

== Charts ==
=== Weekly charts ===
Weekly chart performance for What's Love Got to Do with It
Chart (1993)	Peak position
Australian Albums (ARIA)	30
Austrian Albums (Ö3 Austria)	6
Canada Top Albums/CDs (RPM)	5
Dutch Albums (Album Top 100)	12
European Albums (Music & Media)	4
Finnish Albums (Suomen virallinen lista)	14
German Albums (Offizielle Top 100)	8
Hungarian Albums (MAHASZ)	12
Icelandic Albums (Tónlist)	6
Italian Albums (Musica e dischi)	9
New Zealand Albums (RMNZ)	6
Norwegian Albums (VG-lista)	6
Spanish Albums (AFYVE)	17
Swedish Albums (Sverigetopplistan)	22
Swiss Albums (Schweizer Hitparade)	5
UK Albums (Official Charts)	1
US Billboard 200	17
US Top R&B/Hip-Hop Albums (Billboard)	8
US Cash Box Top Pop Albums	15

2023–2024 weekly chart performance for What's Love Got to Do with It
Chart (2023–2024)	Peak position
Belgian Albums (Ultratop Flanders)	103
Belgian Albums (Ultratop Wallonia)	81
Portuguese Albums (AFP)	57
UK Soundtrack Albums (Official Charts)	2

=== Year-end charts ===
Year-end chart performance for What's Love Got to Do with It
Chart (1993)	Position
Canada Top Albums/CDs (RPM)	41
European Albums (Music & Media)	25
German Albums (Offizielle Top 100)	50
New Zealand Albums (RMNZ)	25
Norwegian End-of-School Period Albums (VG-lista)	13
Swiss Albums (Schweizer Hitparade)	14
UK Albums (OCC)	28
US Top R&B/Hip-Hop Albums (Billboard)	56

== Certifications ==
Certifications for What's Love Got to Do with It
Region	Certification	Certified units/sales
Austria (IFPI Austria)	Gold	25,000^{*}
Canada (Music Canada)	Gold	50,000^{^}
France (SNEP)	Gold	100,000^{*}
Germany (BVMI)	Gold	250,000^{^}
New Zealand (RMNZ)	Platinum	15,000^{^}
Spain (Promusicae)	Gold	50,000^{^}
Switzerland (IFPI Switzerland)	Platinum	50,000^{^}
United Kingdom (BPI)	Platinum	300,000^{^}
United States (RIAA)	Platinum	1,000,000^{^}
^{*} Sales figures based on certification alone.^{^} Shipments figures based on certification alone.
