= React (The Fixx album) =

Live album by the Fixx
- Released: 22 June 1987
- Recorded: 1986–1987 in Canada
- Genre: New wave, rock
- Length: 55:18
- Label: MCA
- Producer: Hugh Padgham

The Fixx chronology
Walkabout (1986)	React (1987)	Calm Animals (1989)

Singles from React
- 1. "Red Skies (re-recorded)" Released: August 1987 (US)

Professional ratings
Review scores
Source	Rating
Allmusic	2/5 stars

React is the first official live album, and fifth album overall, by British new wave band the Fixx, released by MCA Records on 22 June 1987. It was recorded during three concerts in Canada in 1986 in the band's tour in support of their album Walkabout. The album contains three new studio tracks: "Big Wall", "Rules and Schemes", and "Don't Be Scared", which was released as a promotional single. Also included is a re-recorded studio version of "Red Skies", which was released as a single.

== Track listing ==
All songs are written by Dan K. Brown, Cy Curnin, Rupert Greenall, Jamie West-Oram, and Adam Woods, except where noted.

Studio tracks 1–4 recorded and mixed at The Townhouse Studios, London.

Tracks 5,6,8 & 11 recorded at Le Spectrum, Montreal, Quebec 22 October 1986

Tracks 7,9,10,12 & 13 recorded at Massey Hall, Toronto, Ontario 24 October 1986

1. "Red Skies" (Charlie Barrett, Curnin, Greenall, West-Oram, Woods) – 4:33
2. "Big Wall" – 4:15
3. "Don't Be Scared" – 5:00
4. "Rules and Schemes" – 3:43
5. "Deeper and Deeper" – 4:20
6. "Stand or Fall" (Barrett, Curnin, Greenall, West-Oram, Woods) – 4:25
7. "Built for the Future" – 4:04
8. "Saved by Zero" (Alfie Agius, Curnin, Greenall, West-Oram, Woods) – 3:26
9. "Are We Ourselves?" – 2:44
10. "One Thing Leads to Another" (Agius, Curnin, Greenall, West-Oram, Woods) – 4:11

CD extra tracks:

1. "Less Cities, More Moving People" – 4:12
2. "Chase the Fire" – 5:29

CD/Cassette extra track:

1. "Secret Separation" (Brown, Curnin, Greenall, Jeannette Obstoj, West-Oram, Woods) – 4:56

== Personnel ==
- Cy Curnin - lead vocals
- Rupert Greenall - keyboards, backing vocals
- Jamie West-Oram - guitar, backing vocals
- Dan K. Brown - bass, backing vocals
- Adam Woods - drums

Additional personnel

- Steve Gregory - saxophone
- Jeff Scantlebury - percussion, saxophone

Production

- Producer: Hugh Padgham
- Engineers: Guillame Bengle, Scott Litt, Doug McClement, Hugh Padgham
- Mixing: Hugh Padgham
- Mastering: Bob Ludwig
- Art direction: Michael Ross
- Design: Michael Ross
- Photography: Peter Mountain

== Charts ==
Chart performance for React
Chart (1987)	Peak position
US Billboard 200	110
