= Are We Ourselves? =

Single by the Fixx

from the album Phantoms
- B-side: "Deeper and Deeper" (long version); "Question" (UK)
- Released: 6 August 1984
- Length: 2:27
- Label: MCA
- Songwriters: Dan K. Brown, Cy Curnin, Rupert Greenall, Jamie West-Oram, Adam Woods
- Producer: Rupert Hine

The Fixx singles chronology
"Less Cities, More Moving People" (1984)	"Are We Ourselves?" (1984)	"Sunshine in the Shade" (1984)

"Are We Ourselves?" is a song by English new wave band the Fixx, released by MCA Records in the US on 6 August 1984, with a later UK release on 29 October 1984. It was the first US single and second UK single from their third studio album, Phantoms. Written by the band's five members, it was the Fixx's third of four top 20 US hits, the others being "Saved by Zero", "One Thing Leads to Another" and "Secret Separation". The music video was directed by Jeannette Obstoj.

== Description ==
In an interview, the band stated that the song is about taking on a new persona when going somewhere in which one is unfamiliar.

== Chart performance ==
"Are We Ourselves?" debuted on the Billboard Hot 100 on the issue dated August 18, 1984, reaching #15 on the issue dated October 20 of the same year and spending a total of 15 weeks on the chart. It also reached #1 on the Mainstream Rock chart, where it spent a total of two weeks at that position.
