= The Twenty-fifth Anniversary Anthology =

Compilation album by the Fixx
- Released: 24 January 2006
- Genre: New wave, rock
- Length: 73:08 (CD 1); 78:04 (CD 2)
- Label: Rainman RM05082

The Fixx chronology
Stage One (2004)	The Twenty-fifth Anniversary Anthology (2006)

The Twenty-fifth Anniversary Anthology is a compilation album released by the Fixx on 24 January 2006 in celebration of their 25th anniversary. It contains singles, album and live tracks from their previous albums, together with a cover version of Nancy Sinatra's "These Boots Are Made for Walkin'" that was originally recorded for the multi-artist album When Pigs Fly: Songs You Thought You'd Never Hear. The eight-page booklet contains an essay by Josh Norek.

== Track listing ==
CD 1

1. "Stand or Fall" – 3:46
2. "The Fool" – 5:16
3. "Red Skies" – 4:15
4. "Shuttered Room" – 2:46
5. "Lost Planes" – 3:20
6. "One Thing Leads to Another" (Live) – 3:36
7. "Deeper And Deeper" (Live) – 4:30
8. "Saved by Zero" – 3:34
9. "Are We Ourselves?" (Live) – 3:06
10. "Secret Separation" (Live) – 3:53
11. "Built for the Future" – 4:03
12. "Driven Out" – 3:58
13. "Precious Stone" – 3:03
14. "Calm Animals" – 4:08
15. "Shred of Evidence" – 3:39
16. "Cause to be Alarmed" – 3:44
17. "All is Fair" (Live) – – 4:30
18. "How Much is Enough?" – 3:58
19. "No One Has to Cry" – 4:02

CD 2

1. "Woman on a Train" (Acoustic) – 6:32
2. "Cameras in Paris" (Acoustic) – 5:13
3. "One Jungle" (Acoustic) – 3:32
4. "Freeman" – 6:07
5. "Mayfly" – 5:44
6. "Two Different Views" – 5:02
7. "We Once Held Hands" – 7:45
8. "Happy Landings" – 4:17
9. "These Boots Are Made for Walkin'" – 5:42
10. "Want That Life" – 3:49
11. "Are You Satisfied?" – 5:46
12. "You Don't Have to Prove Yourself" – 4:11
13. "No Hollywood Ending" – 3:53
14. "Touch" – 4:36
15. "Saved by Zero" (Acoustic) – 5:53
