= George Underwood (artist) =

British artist and musician (born 1947)

- Born: 5 February 1947 (age 79); Bromley, Kent, England
- Education: Beckenham School of Art; Ravensbourne College of Art
- Known for: Book covers, album covers
- Website: georgeunderwood.com

George Underwood (born 5 February 1947) is a British artist and musician. He is best known for designing album covers for numerous bands in the 1970s and his collaborations with long-term friend, singer-songwriter David Bowie.

== Early life and career ==
George Underwood was born on 5 February 1947, in Bromley, Kent. He attended Bromley Technical High School where he developed an interest in music alongside classmates David Bowie and Peter Frampton. Underwood and Bowie's band, George and the Dragons was short-lived due to Underwood punching Bowie in the left eye and accidentally scratching the pupil with his fingernail, during a fight over a girl, leaving Bowie with faulty depth perception and anisocoria (a permanently dilated pupil). The injury did not affect their friendship in the end, and Underwood went on to record one album with Bowie (in their band The King Bees) as well as a solo record under the name Calvin James.

After deciding that the music business was not for him, Underwood returned to art studies, joining Beckenham School of Art in 1963 which became Ravensbourne College of Art in 1964. He worked in design studios as an illustrator. Initially, he specialised in fantasy, horror and science fiction book covers, but as many of his colleagues were in the music business, they began asking him to do various art works for them. This led to him becoming a freelance artist. Underwood established himself as a leading art illustrator doing album covers for such artists as T. Rex (Futuristic Dragon, My People Were Fair and Had Sky in Their Hair... But Now They're Content to Wear Stars on Their Brows), The Fixx (Phantoms, Reach the Beach, Beautiful Friction and Calm Animals), Procol Harum (Shine On Brightly), Mott the Hoople (All the Young Dudes) and David Bowie (Hunky Dory and The Rise and Fall of Ziggy Stardust and the Spiders from Mars). During this period, he produced hundreds of book covers, LP and CD covers, advertisements, portraits and drawings.

He appears in the 2012 documentary David Bowie & the Story of Ziggy Stardust (BBC Cymru Wales) narrated by Jarvis Cocker.
