= Sweet Pandemonium =

Sweet Pandemonium may refer to:

- "Sweet Pandemonium", a song by the Fixx on the album Happy Landings and Lost Tracks, 2001
- "Sweet Pandemonium", a song by HIM on the album Love Metal, 2003
