= Wildest Wish to Fly =

The Wildest Wish to Fly

Studio album by Rupert Hine
- Released: 1983
- Length: 48:53
- Label: Resurgent
- Producer: Rupert Hine, Stephen W. Tayler

Rupert Hine chronology
Waving Not Drowning (1982)	The Wildest Wish to Fly (1983)	Better Off Dead (1985)

The Wildest Wish to Fly is a solo album by Rupert Hine. It was originally released in 1983 on A&M Records and Island Records and re-released on CD in 2001 on VoicePrint. The album peaked at #31 on the Swedish album chart.

== Track listing ==
All tracks composed by Rupert Hine

1. "No Yellow Heart" (Original Version)
2. "Living in Sin"
3. "The Saturation of the Video Rat"
4. "Firefly in the Night"
5. "A Golden Age"
6. "Picture-phone"
7. "Victim of Wanderlust"
8. "The Most Dangerous of Men"
9. "The Wildest Wish to Fly"
10. "Blue Flame (Melt the Ice)" (Bonus CD track)
11. "No Yellow Heart" (Later Version) (Bonus CD track)

== Personnel ==
Includes liner notes by Rupert Hine

- Rupert Hine - vocals, various instruments
- Robert Palmer - vocals on "Living in Sin"
- Phil Palmer - guitar
- James West-Oram (member of The Fixx) - guitar
- Stephen W Tayler - woodwinds, recording and mixing
- Michael Dawe - drums
