= Better Off Dead (1985 film) =

1985 American black comedy film

- Theatrical release poster by Drew Struzan
- Directed by: Savage Steve Holland
- Written by: Savage Steve Holland
- Produced by: Michael Jaffe
- Starring: John Cusack; David Ogden Stiers; Diane Franklin; Kim Darby
- Cinematography: Isidore Mankofsky
- Edited by: Alan Balsam
- Music by: Rupert Hine
- Production companies: A&M Films; CBS Theatrical Films
- Distributed by: Warner Bros. Pictures
- Release date: August 23, 1985
- Running time: 97 minutes
- Country: United States
- Language: English
- Budget: $3.5 million
- Box office: $10.3 million

Better Off Dead is a 1985 American teen comedy film written and directed by Savage Steve Holland. It stars John Cusack, David Ogden Stiers, Diane Franklin and Kim Darby. The film was released by Warner Bros. Pictures on August 23, 1985.

Initially met with mixed reviews on release, it has since developed a cult following for its unconventionally surreal and absurdist humor.

== Plot ==
In the fictional Northern California town of Greendale, high school student Lane Meyer's two main interests are skiing and his girlfriend of six months, Beth Truss. Shortly before Christmas, Beth dumps him for the handsome and popular captain of the ski team, Roy Stalin.

Roy is an arrogant bully who unfairly rejects Lane at ski team tryouts. Beth also criticizes Lane's car, an old station wagon. Although Lane also owns a 1967 Camaro, he has not been able to get it running and it sits dilapidated in the driveway.

Lane lives in a suburban development with his mother Jenny, a ditzy housewife who routinely concocts creepy (and creeping) family meals; his genius little brother Badger, who never speaks but at the age of "almost 8" can build powerful lasers and attract trashy women from "How-to" books; and his lawyer father, Al, who daily tries to stop the menacing paperboy, Johnny, from breaking his garage door windows with thrown newspapers.

Furthermore, Johnny claims that the Meyers owe him two dollars for newspapers, and persistently hounds Lane, yelling "I want my two dollars!" Lane also regularly encounters two Japanese drag racers, one who only speaks in Japanese and the other who learned to speak English by listening to Howard Cosell.

Lane cannot move past Beth's rejection, so decides that death is the only way out of his misery. He makes several half-hearted attempts at suicide, which all comically fail. With the help of his best friend, Charles de Mar (who in lieu of not being able to get "real drugs" in their "bodaciously small town," constantly inhales everyday substances like Jell-O, snow, and nitrous oxide from a whipped cream can), Lane tries to ski the K-12, the highest peak in town, in hopes of getting Beth back, but wipes out.

Lane is further embarrassed when he gets fired from his humiliating fast food job at Pig Burgers in front of Roy and Beth, who are there on a date. To top it all, he increasingly begins to suffer from neurotic hallucinations owing to the mounting frustrations in his life.

As Lane attempts to either end his life or win back his ex-girlfriend, he gradually gets to know a new girl: French foreign-exchange student Monique Junot, who has a crush on him; she is staying with Lane's overbearing neighbor Mrs. Smith, who continually tries to force Monique into being a girlfriend for her socially awkward son Ricky.

The Smiths are so annoying that Monique pretends she cannot speak English. She is a Los Angeles Dodgers fan, who turns out to be an excellent auto mechanic and skier. Monique both helps Lane fix his Camaro and tries to build his confidence.

When Roy insults Monique, Lane challenges him to a ski race down the K-12, with the winner to be captain of the ski team. She helps Lane prepare for the race, which he ultimately wins despite losing a ski and being pursued by Johnny. Beth rushes to embrace Lane at the finish line, but he rejects her and after besting Ricky (who attempts to keep Lane from rescuing Monique from the restraints of his mother) in a ski-pole swordfight, drives off with Monique in his Camaro.

Lane and Monique are last seen kissing on home plate at Dodger Stadium, with Johnny bicycling towards them, while in a mid-credit scene Badger launches a homemade space shuttle from his room through the roof of the house.

== Cast ==
- John Cusack as Lane Myer
- David Ogden Stiers as Al Myer
- Diane Franklin as Monique Junot
- Kim Darby as Jenny Myer
- Curtis Armstrong as Charles De Mar
- Amanda Wyss as Beth Truss
- Yuji Okumoto as Yee Sook Ree
- Scooter Stevens as Badger
- Dan Schneider as Ricky Smith
- Chuck Mitchell as Rocko
- Vincent Schiavelli as Mr. Kerber
- Taylor Negron as Mailman
- Rick Rosenthal as Smitty
- E. G. Daily as Herself
- Sebastian Dungan as Paperboy
- Steven Williams as Tree Trimmer

== Production ==
Parts of the film were shot in Alta, Brighton, and Snowbird, in Utah. The Meyers' home is located at 1636 Virginia Avenue, in Glendale, CA. Across the street, at 1633 Virginia, is the home of the Smith family and French exchange student Monique Junot. Lane's high school is Hollywood High School, located at 1521 North Highland Avenue, in Los Angeles, CA. Pig Burgers was filmed at Sandy's Char Burger at 6223 Lankershim Blvd. The restaurant has since gone out of business, but the building still sports the burger signage. The exterior of the school dance sequence was shot at Anderson W. Clark Magnet High School in La Crescenta, CA. The street on which Lane is consistently challenged by the Japanese drag racers is located near the foothills of Monrovia, CA. Several other driving scenes were shot in the Los Angeles suburbs of Duarte and Sierra Madre.

The hand-drawn animation in the movie was animated by Savage Steve Holland's collaborator Bill Kopp, who would later work with him on One Crazy Summer (1986) and Eek! The Cat. A dream sequence where hamburgers and fries come to life was produced in stop motion.

According to an interview with Diane Franklin on the RetroZest Podcast, actor Yano Anaya, who played one of Johnny Gasparini's paperboy gang members, also looped all of Demian Slade's dialogue as Johnny the paperboy. Anaya also played bully Grover Dill in A Christmas Story (1983) and young Michael Anthony in the music video for Van Halen's "Hot for Teacher" (1984).

== Reception ==
Better Off Dead was one of the few films critics Siskel & Ebert featured on their weekly television show At the Movies while bypassing entirely in their respective Chicago newspapers. They gave the film "two thumbs down". Bill Cosford of The Miami Herald wrote, "Better Off Dead has the body of a tired teen comedy but the soul of an inspired student film; it's the first movie in a long time to interrupt itself periodically with flights of animated fancy."

According to Holland, Cusack did not like the film and walked out of a screening during the filming of Holland's One Crazy Summer (in which he also starred), later confronting Holland, saying Better Off Dead "was the worst thing I have ever seen. I will never trust you as a director ever again, so don't speak to me." Holland claimed that Cusack felt he had been made to look foolish and that his comments "made me not care about movies anymore". However, in a 2013 Reddit "Ask Me Anything" chat, Cusack was asked if he hated filming Better Off Dead, and responded, "No, I just thought it could have been better, but I think that about almost all my films. I have nothing against the film.... Glad people love it still."

On review aggregator Rotten Tomatoes, the film holds an approval rating of 75% based on 28 reviews, with an average rating of 6.70/10. The website's critical consensus reads, "Better Off Dead is an anarchic mix of black humor and surreal comedy anchored by John Cusack's winsome, charming performance." On Metacritic, the film received a score of 51 based on 7 reviews, indicating "mixed or average" reviews.

== Soundtrack ==
Better Off Dead: Original A&M Soundcrack [sic]

Soundtrack album by Various artists
- Released: 1985
- Genre: Rock
- Length: 39:45
- Label: A&M
- Producers: Rupert Hine, Steve Goldstein

Professional ratings
Review scores
Source	Rating
AllMusic	link

The film's soundtrack was produced primarily by Rupert Hine.

The opening track, "With One Look (The Wildest Dream)", was produced by Hine and features Cy Curnin and Jamie West-Oram of the Fixx on lead vocals and guitars, respectively. Hine had previously worked with Curnin and West-Oram, and also contributed vocals to the song. The following track, "Arrested by You", as well as "Better Off Dub (Title Music)" and "Race the K-12 (Instrumental)", were performed solely by Hine. "Arrested by You" was covered by Dusty Springfield on her 1990 album, Reputation.

"Dancing in Isolation" features Terri Nunn of Berlin on lead vocals. Hine produced the song and was reportedly under consideration to produce an album for Berlin.

"Come to Your Rescue" was performed by Thinkman, a group formed by, and including, Hine for the purpose of restoring his solo career without the music press knowing about it. West-Oram also provided guitar work to this song, as well as the instrumental "The Falcon Beat".

The only two tracks on the CD without Hine's involvement are "A Little Luck" and "One Way Love (Better Off Dead)". Elizabeth Daily, credited on the soundtrack as E.G. Daily, sang lead vocals on both songs and also performed them in the film during the high school dance scene.

A number of songs that appear in the film do not appear on the CD soundtrack, including Howard Jones' "Like to Get to Know You Well", Van Halen's "Everybody Wants Some!!", Neil Sedaka's "Breaking Up Is Hard to Do", Paul Simon's "Fifty Ways to Leave Your Lover", Jimi Hendrix's "Foxy Lady", Frank Sinatra singing "A Man Alone" by Rod McKuen, Hall & Oates' "She's Gone", Linda Rondstat’s cover of Hurt So Bad, and Muddy Waters' "Mannish Boy".

=== Track listing ===
Credits adapted from CD liner notes.

Side one

1. "With One Look (The Wildest Dream)" (Torrence Merdur, Rupert Hine) – Rupert Hine and Cy Curnin – 3:26
2. "Arrested By You" (Merdur, Hine) – Rupert Hine – 5:07
3. "Shine" (Martin Ansell) – Martin Ansell – 3:49
4. "Better Off Dub (Title Music)" (Hine) – Rupert Hine – 3:48
5. "Dancing in Isolation" (Merdur, Hine) – Terri Nunn – 4:04

Side two

1. "Come to Your Rescue" (Jeannette Obstoj, Hine) – Thinkman – 5:03
2. "A Little Luck" (Angela Rubin) – E.G. Daily – 4:21
3. "The Falcon Beat (Instrumental)" (Hine) – Rupert Hine – 2:37
4. "One Way Love (Better Off Dead)" (Steve Goldstein, Duane Hitchings, Craig Krampf, Eric Nelson) – E.G. Daily – 3:33
5. "Race the K-12" (Hine) – Rupert Hine – 3:49

=== Personnel ===
Musicians

- Cy Curnin – lead and backing vocals (track 1)
- Rupert Hine – lead vocals (tracks 1–2), backing vocals (tracks 1–2, 5–6), all non-guitar instruments (tracks 1, 5, 8), all instruments (tracks 2, 4, 10), keyboards (track 3), drums (track 3)
- Jamie West-Oram – guitars (tracks 1, 5–6, 8)
- Martin Ansell – lead vocals (track 3), guitars (track 3)
- Chris Rodel – bass guitar (track 3)
- Trevor Morais – drums (track 3)
- Terri Nunn – lead vocals (track 5), backing vocals (track 5)
- Matthew Harte – lead vocals (track 6), backing vocals (track 6)
- Daniel Zimmerman – backing vocals (track 6)
- Geoffrey Richardson – guitars (track 6)
- Cellophane – keyboards (track 6)
- Leo Hurll – bass guitar (track 6)
- Anders Mayhem – drums (track 6)
- E.G. Daily – lead vocals (track 7, 9), backing vocals (track 7)
- Waddy Wachtel – guitars (tracks 7, 9)
- Steve Goldstein – keyboards (tracks 7, 9)
- Bob Getter – bass guitar (tracks 7, 9)
- Craig Krampf – drums (track 7, 9)
- Angela Rubin – backing vocals (track 7)
- Craig Hull – guitars (track 9)

Technical

- Rupert Hine – producer, arranger (tracks 1–6, 8, 10)
- Stephen W. Taylor – engineer
- Andy Scarth – assistant engineer
- Steve Goldstein – producer (tracks 7, 9)
- Niko Bolas – engineer (tracks 7, 9)
- Arun Chakraverty – original mastering
- Frank DeLuna – remastering
- Richard Frankel – art direction
- John Heiden – design
