= Phantoms (The Fixx album) =

Studio album by the Fixx
- Released: 14 August 1984
- Recorded: 1984
- Studios: Farmyard (Little Chalfont, Buckinghamshire)
- Genre: New wave
- Length: 41:52
- Label: MCA
- Producer: Rupert Hine

The Fixx chronology
Reach the Beach (1983)	Phantoms (1984)	Walkabout (1986)

Singles from Phantoms
- 1. "Less Cities, More Moving People" Released: 6 August 1984 (UK) 11 February 1985 (US); 2. "Are We Ourselves?" Released: 6 August 1984 (US); 3. "Sunshine in the Shade" Released: 5 November 1984 (US); 4. "I Will" Released: 18 February 1985 (UK)

Phantoms is the third studio album by the English band the Fixx, released by MCA Records in the US on 14 August 1984, followed by a UK release on 3 September 1984.

It contains the American hit "Are We Ourselves?", which reached No. 15 on the Billboard Hot 100 in the fall of 1984. The song hit No. 1 on Billboard's Album Rock Tracks chart, staying at the summit for several weeks. It was also assisted by a popular MTV music video. The album's cover art was provided by George Underwood, who had also provided artwork for the band's previous album, Reach the Beach (1983), and went on to illustrate future Fixx releases including Calm Animals (1989) and Beautiful Friction (2012).

== Critical reception ==
Professional ratings
Review scores
Source	Rating
AllMusic	3.5/5 stars
The Rolling Stone Album Guide	2/5 stars

The Rolling Stone Album Guide considered the album to be "interesting only as a matter of nostalgia."

== Track listing ==
All tracks are written by Dan K. Brown, Cy Curnin, Rupert Greenall, Jamie West-Oram, and Adam Woods, except where noted.

Side one
No.	Title	Writer(s)	Length
1.	"Lose Face"		3:03
2.	"Less Cities, More Moving People"		3:53
3.	"Sunshine in the Shade"		2:26
4.	"Woman on a Train"	Brown; Curnin; Greenall; Jeannette Obstoj; West-Oram; Woods	3:56
5.	"Wish"		4:08
6.	"Lost in Battle Overseas"		4:10

Side two
No.	Title	Length
7.	"Question"	3:26
8.	"In Suspense"	3:45
9.	"Facing the Wind"	3:20
10.	"Are We Ourselves?"	2:27
11.	"I Will"	3:54
12.	"Phantom Living"	3:50
Total length:		41:52

== Personnel ==
Credits are adapted from the Phantoms liner notes.

The Fixx

- Cy Curnin – vocals
- Adam Woods – drums; percussion
- Rupert Greenall – keyboards
- James West-Oram – guitar
- Dan K. Brown – bass

Production and artwork

- Rupert Hine – producer
- Stephen W Tayler, assisted by Andrew Scarth – recorded by, mixing
- George Underwood – cover art

== Charts ==
Chart (1984)	Peak position
Canada (RPM)	18
Dutch Charts	41
German Charts	59
US Billboard 200	19

Singles

Year	Single	Chart	Position
1984	"Are We Ourselves?"	Billboard Hot 100	15
1984	"Are We Ourselves?"	Top Rock Tracks	1
1984	"Sunshine in the Shade"	Billboard Hot 100	69
1984	"Sunshine in the Shade"	Top Rock Tracks	37
1985	"Less Cities, More Moving People"	Billboard Hot 100	–
1985	"Less Cities, More Moving People"	Top Rock Tracks	–
1985	"Less Cities, More Moving People"	Club Play Singles	68
