= Reach the Beach =

Studio album by the Fixx
- Released: 13 May 1983
- Recorded: 1982–1983
- Studios: Farmyard (Little Chalfont, Buckinghamshire)
- Genres: New wave; art rock
- Length: 41:10
- Label: MCA
- Producer: Rupert Hine

The Fixx chronology
Shuttered Room (1982)	Reach the Beach (1983)	Phantoms (1984)

Singles from Reach the Beach
- 1. "Saved by Zero" Released: 15 April 1983; 2. "One Thing Leads to Another" Released: 18 August 1983 (US); 3. "The Sign of Fire" Released: 23 November 1983 (US)

Professional ratings
Review scores
Source	Rating
AllMusic	4.5/5 stars
Smash Hits	3/10

Reach the Beach is the second studio album by the English new wave band the Fixx, released by MCA Records in May 1983. It was the group's most successful studio album, reaching No. 8 on the Billboard albums chart and eventually selling two million copies in the United States alone. The album was certified Platinum by the RIAA. It was certified platinum in Canada in November 1983. The album's cover art was provided by George Underwood, who went on to illustrate future Fixx releases including Phantoms (1984), Calm Animals (1989), and Beautiful Friction (2012).

Reach the Beach contains their best-known and highest charting single, "One Thing Leads to Another", which reached No. 4 on the Billboard Hot 100.

== Track listing ==
All tracks are written by Alfie Agius, Cy Curnin, Rupert Greenall, Jamie West-Oram, and Adam Woods, except where noted.

Side one
No.	Title	Length
1.	"One Thing Leads to Another"	3:19
2.	"The Sign of Fire"	3:52
3.	"Running"	4:26
4.	"Saved by Zero"	3:40
5.	"Opinions"	4:50

Side two
No.	Title	Length
6.	"Reach the Beach"	4:27
7.	"Changing"	3:24
8.	"Liner"	3:39
9.	"Privilege"	4:16
10.	"Outside"	5:25
Total length:		41:10

2003 CD bonus tracks
No.	Title	Writer(s)	Length
11.	"Saved by Zero" (Extended Version)		4:24
12.	"One Thing Leads to Another" (Extended Version)		8:00
13.	"Deeper and Deeper" (Long Version)	Curnin; West-Oram	6:31
14.	"Going Overboard"	Curnin; Greenall; West-Oram; Woods	3:18

== Personnel ==
Credits are adapted from the Reach the Beach liner notes.

Musicians

- Cy Curnin – vocals
- Rupert Greenall – keyboards
- Jamie West-Oram – guitar
- Adam Woods – percussion; drums
- Alfie Agius – bass on "One Thing Leads to Another", "Saved by Zero" and "Liner"
- Dan K. Brown – bass on "The Sign of Fire"

Agius left the Fixx partway through the recording sessions, and is not listed as an official group member in the album credits.

Brown played bass on one track, and on the subsequent tour; he would be promoted to full group-member status as of the band's next studio album, Phantoms (1984).

Production and artwork

- Rupert Hine – producer
- Stephen W Tayler – engineer; mixing
- George Underwood – front cover painting
- Trevor Toms – photography
- The Cream Group (Design Company from Amsterdam, the Netherlands) – mechanical artwork

== Charts ==
Chart (1983)	Peak position
Australia Kent Music Report	68
Canada RPM	8
Dutch Charts	38
UK Official Charts	91
US Billboard 200	8

Singles

Year	Single	Chart	Position
1983	"One Thing Leads to Another"	Billboard Hot 100	4
1983	"One Thing Leads to Another"	Top Rock Tracks	2
1983	"One Thing Leads to Another"	Club Play Singles	14
1983	"Saved by Zero"	Billboard Hot 100	20
1983	"Saved by Zero"	Top Rock Tracks	9
1984	"The Sign of Fire"	Billboard Hot 100	32
1984	"The Sign of Fire"	Top Rock Tracks	20
