= I Might Have Been Queen =

Song by Tina Turner

from the album Private Dancer
- Released: November 16, 1984
- Genre: Rock
- Length: 4:10
- Label: Capitol
- Songwriters: Jeanette Obstoj, Rupert Hine, Jamie West-Oram
- Producer: Rupert Hine

"I Might Have Been Queen" is a song written for Tina Turner as the first track on her highly successful Private Dancer album, and later included as a re-mixed version, with an additional lyric added to the bridge, on her What's Love Got to Do With It soundtrack album.

The song was written by Jeanette Obstoj, Rupert Hine, and The Fixx's Jamie West-Oram for the Private Dancer album.

The lyrics are meant to be autobiographical, telling Turner's story. Following a discussion with Rupert Hine, co-writer Jeannette Obstoj spoke with Turner about her life, starting with the cotton fields in Nutbush, Tennessee. They also discussed Turner's interest in Egypt and her belief in previous lives, including her apparent belief that in a prior life she was Hatshepsut, a Pharaoh who took the throne from her brother.

"I Might Have Been Queen" was performed on the 1984 Private Dancer Tour and during the performance at Radio City Music Hall in New York City (July 17, 1993.)

== Personnel ==
- Tina Turner – lead and background vocals
- Rupert Hine
