= December (The Waterboys song) =

Single by The Waterboys

from the album The Waterboys
- B-side: "Where Are You Now That I Need You"
- Released: 14 October 1983
- Length: 6:48 (album version); 4:28 (single version)
- Label: Ensign
- Songwriter(s): Mike Scott
- Producer(s): Mike Scott; Rupert Hine

The Waterboys singles chronology
"A Girl Called Johnny" (1983)	"December" (1983)	"The Big Music" (1984)

"December" is a song by British band the Waterboys, released on 14 October 1983 as the second and final single from their debut studio album The Waterboys. The song was written and produced by Mike Scott, with additional production by Rupert Hine. A music video was filmed to promote the single.

== Background ==
"December" was written in Ayr, Scotland, and recorded at Redshop in December 1981 and Farmyard in June 1982. It was one of the first songs recorded by Scott for what went on to become the Waterboys. At the time, Scott was a member of the band Funhouse and wished to leave and pursue a new musical path. He recorded three of his own tracks at Redshop in December 1981, including "December", with the engineer Jim Preen. Using pre-recorded drum loops available at the studio, Scott performed all instrumentation himself. Scott revealed to Sounds in 1983, "'December' was done in an eight track studio. It was just a Linn drum track and I played guitar and piano over the top and sang. There's no bass guitar on it, just the bottom end of the piano. That's all there is, yet it sounds massive because we mixed it using a 24 track studio."

Scott recorded the song's rhythm and two lead parts using his Danelectro "Bellzouki" 12-string guitar. In his autobiography, he said of the song's recording process with the guitar, "I laid it down in about thirty minutes - seven minutes for each overdub, and just about time to breathe in between. As the multiple-Bellzouki sound took shape, I was astonished at its breadth, and also at my own playing: the Bellzouki had inspired me beyond my limits, and the sound of my inner imagination was coming out of a pair of speaks in front of me." Additional recording on the track was carried out at Farmyard Studios in June 1982, with Rupert Hine providing additional production.

== Critical reception ==
On its release as a single, Betty Page of Record Mirror commented, "Whimper, whimper. This week's 90th moody, tremulous ballad with lashings of tearful vibrato and acoustic twelve-strings. A record to sit down and listen to as the leaves fall, it informs us that 'December is the cool month'. Oh really?" Barney Hoskyns of New Musical Express gave the single a rating of six out of ten. He described it as a "big acoustic anatomy of melancholy" and added that it was "too long and involved for a single, but nice all the same". Jim Whiteford of the Kilmarnock Standard described the song as a "mid-tempo number" which is "heavily but effectively produced to give a rich sound around the slightly muffled vocal lead" and added that "the Bible story is there if you listen". He concluded that the song was "very hummable" and could have top 40 potential. Hugh Fielder of Sounds believed the song to be "even more potent" than "A Girl Called Johnny" and summarised, "Shimmering sounds and haunting vocals that characterise the Waterboys perfectly."

Allan Jones of Melody Maker wrote, "The Waterboys continue to wallow in a senseless melodrama. They expect the world to be too traumatic, are disappointed when their daily dramas don't match the sketches in their imagination: they exaggerate, and so they're unbelievable." Sunie of Number One considered "December" to be "a dispiriting little thing" and added, "The Waterboys have a singer who can't sing but clearly thinks he can. Their music is drippy modern rock, like U2 with the fire put out, and the song is an early bid for the religious Christmas hit." In 1984, U2 singer Bono included "December" in a list of his top ten records of 1983 for Rolling Stone.

In a review of the mini-album edition of The Waterboys, Diana Valois of The Morning Call considered the song to be "about coming of age" and noted the "fat and flavorful guitar work". Parke Puterbaugh of Rolling Stone described "December" as a "longish song, more meditative though no less inquisitive, as Scott, like Van Morrison, goes looking for the proverbial lion in the soul".

== Formats ==
7" single
No.	Title	Length
1.	"December"	4:28
2.	"Where Are You Now That I Need You"	5:02

12" single
No.	Title	Length
1.	"December"	6:48
2.	"The Three Day Man"	3:32
3.	"Red Army Blues"	8:05

12" single (US promo)
No.	Title	Length
1.	"December"	6:48
2.	"December" (Edit)	4:28

== Personnel ==
December

- Mike Scott – vocals, guitar
- Rupert Hine, Steven Tayler – bass drum and cymbal programming

The Three Day Man

- Mike Scott – vocals, guitar, piano, harmonica
- Anthony Thistlethwaite – saxophone
- Matthew Seligman – bass
- Preston Heyman – drums

Red Army Blues

- Mike Scott – vocals, piano, guitar, bass
- Anthony Thistlethwaite – saxophone, mandolin
- Kevin Wilkinson – drums
- Ingrid Schroeder – vocals

Production

- Mike Scott – producer of "December" and "Red Army Blues"
- Rupert Hine – additional production on "December"
- Jim Preen – engineer on "December" and "Red Army Blue"
- Steven Tayler – engineer on "December"
- Harry Parker – producer of "The Three Day Man"
- Richard Digby Smith – engineer on "Red Army Blue"

== Charts ==
Chart (1983)	Peak position
UK Singles Chart (OCC)	113
