= Why Must We Wait Until Tonight =

"Why Must We Wait Until Tonight?"

Single by Tina Turner

from the album What's Love Got to Do with It
- B-side: "Shake a Tail Feather" (album version)
- Released: September 16, 1993
- Length: 5:55 (album version); 4:28 (single version)
- Label: Virgin; Parlophone
- Songwriters: Bryan Adams; Robert John "Mutt" Lange
- Producers: Bryan Adams; Robert John "Mutt" Lange

Tina Turner singles chronology
"Disco Inferno" (1993)	"Why Must We Wait Until Tonight?" (1993)	"Proud Mary" (1993)

Music video
- "Why Must We Wait Until Tonight" on YouTube

"Why Must We Wait Until Tonight" is a song performed by American recording artist and actress Tina Turner for her 1993 What's Love Got to Do with It soundtrack album. The track was written and produced by Bryan Adams and Robert John "Mutt" Lange. It was released in September 1993 by Virgin and Parlophone, peaking at number 16 in the United Kingdom and number 25 in Ireland. In the US, the song reached numbers 97 and 83 on the Billboard Hot 100 and Cash Box Top 100.

== Critical reception ==
Larry Flick from Billboard magazine described "Why Must We Wait Until Tonight" as "a pleading ballad, that derives much of its drama and intensity from La Tina's incomparable vocal style." He added, "Plunking piano/synth riffs click over a shuffling and percussive beat, with just a subtle touch of Hammond organ here and there to provide a blues subtext." Troy J. Augusto from Cash Box named it "a showcase for Turner's vocal prowess and should see no resistance at hit or adult radio formats." He also complimented the songwriters for "giving the ballad a dramatic grandeur that few could handle. Turner, of course, pulls it off with ease, the result is one of her most accessible single releases ever."

A reviewer from The Daily Vault deemed "the sensuous rendering" as "almost as good", as "What's Love Got to Do With It". Dave Sholin from the Gavin Report said, "The lyrics speak of fine wine, something that defines Tina Turner's amazing artistry—which just keeps getting better. Writers/producers Bryan Adams and Mutt Lange give her the words and the melody and she does the rest. By the way, if you're one of the few who haven't seen the movie What's Love Got To Do With It yet, do it tonight!" Alan Jones from Music Week gave the song a score of four out of five, stating that the singer "offers one of her more relaxed vocal performances" on a "pleasant" ballad.

== Track listings ==
- European and Japanese CD single; UK 7-inch and cassette single
1. "Why Must We Wait Until Tonight?" (7-inch edit) – 4:30
2. "Shake a Tail Feather" (album version) – 2:32
- European and Australian CD maxi-single; European and UK 12-inch single
1. "Why Must We Wait Until Tonight?" (single edit) – 4:31
2. "Why Must We Wait Until Tonight?" (full remix) – 5:24
3. "Why Must We Wait Until Tonight?" (album version) – 5:53
4. "Shake a Tail Feather" – 2:32
- UK CD maxi-single
1. "Why Must We Wait Until Tonight?" (album version) – 5:53
2. "The Best" (Jimmy Barnes Version) – 4:13
3. "Shake a Tail Feather" (album version) – 2:34
4. "Why Must We Wait Until Tonight?" (remix) – 5:23
- US 7-inch and cassette single
1. "Why Must We Wait Until Tonight?" – 5:53
2. "Shake a Tail Feather" – 2:32
- US CD maxi-single
1. "Why Must We Wait Until Tonight?" (7-inch edit) – 4:30
2. "Why Must We Wait Until Tonight?" (Tony Dofat remix) – 5:23
3. "Why Must We Wait Until Tonight?" (LP version) – 5:51
4. "Why Must We Wait Until Tonight?" (Tony Dofat piano/drums/vocals only) – 5:16
5. "Shake a Tail Feather" – 2:32
6. "Why Must We Wait Until Tonight?" (acappella) – 4:28

== Charts ==
Chart (1993–1994)	Peak position
Belgium (Ultratop 50 Flanders)	49
Canada Top Singles (RPM)	22
Europe (Eurochart Hot 100)	43
Europe (European Hit Radio)	12
Germany (GfK)	55
Ireland (IRMA)	25
Israel (Israeli Singles Chart)	17
UK Singles (Official Charts)	16
UK Airplay (Music Week)	23
US Billboard Hot 100	97
US Bubbling Under R&B/Hip-Hop Singles (Billboard)	10
US Cash Box Top 100	83

== Release history ==
Region	Date	Format(s)	Label(s)	Ref.
United States	September 16, 1993	CD; cassette	Virgin	
United Kingdom	October 18, 1993	7-inch vinyl; CD1; cassette	Parlophone	
United Kingdom	October 25, 1993	CD2	Parlophone	
Japan	December 22, 1993	Mini-CD	EMI	
Australia	March 28, 1994	CD; cassette	Parlophone	
