= Happy Landings and Lost Tracks =

Compilation album by the Fixx
- Released: 11 December 2001
- Recorded: 26 February – 28 April 1996
- Genre: Pop / rock
- Length: 51:10
- Label: Beyond/Rainman; 398 578 250-2
- Producer: Martin Rex

The Fixx chronology
Extended Versions (2000)	Happy Landings and Lost Tracks (2001)	Then and Now (2002)

Happy Landings and Lost Tracks is a compilation album by the Fixx released on 11 December 2001.

== Happy Landings 1996 planned album release ==
The compilation comprises tracks recorded during sessions that took place between 26 February and 28 April 1996 in Maida Vale, London. The sessions were for a planned album, Happy Landings, that was to be released later that year with the following track listing (other tracks recorded during these sessions included "House Arrest" and "Prove Yourself"):

1. "Modern World" – 4:08
2. "Two Different Views" – 5:11
3. "Going Without" – 4:41
4. "Freeman" – 6:06
5. "Happy Landings" – 4:25
6. "Ocean Blue" – 6:05
7. "We Once Held Hands" – 7:48
8. "Sweet Pandemonium" – 4:01
9. "Mayfly" – 5:42
10. "Elected" – 2:54

== Happy Landings 1997 planned album release ==
The 1996 version of Happy Landings was not released, but eight of the tracks were subsequently re-recorded and remixed by Stephen W. Tayler and Sadia Sadia during February and March 1997 for a planned release of the album later that year. The band also recorded the new tracks "Lonely As A Lighthouse" (recorded 10–12 February 1997 at Route One Studios, London) and "Life's What's Killing Me", replacing "Mayfly" and "Elected". Another track under development at this time was titled "Peace Louise".

1. "Modern World"
2. "Two Different Views"
3. "Going Without"
4. "Happy Landings"
5. "Freeman"
6. "We Once Held Hands"
7. "Lonely As A Lighthouse"
8. "Ocean Blue"
9. "Life's What's Killing Me"
10. "Sweet Pandemonium"
- Cy Curnin – lead vocals, guitar
- Rupert Greenall – keyboards, vocals
- Jamie West-Oram – guitar, vocals, lead vocals on "Sweet Pandemonium"
- Adam Woods – drums

Additional personnel

- Jeff Scantlebury – percussion
- Chris Tait – bass on "Modern World" and "Two Different Views"
- Dennis Bovell – bass on "Going Without", "Freeman" and "We Once Held Hands"
- Dan K. Brown – bass on "Sweet Pandemonium"
- Matthew Kleinman & Jason McDermot – brass on "Freeman"
- Liz Skillings – background vocals on "Two Different Views", "Ocean Blue" and "Sweet Pandemonium"

Six of the 1997 session tracks ("Two Different Views", "Going Without", "Happy Landings", "We Once Held Hands", "Ocean Blue" and "Life's What's Killing Me") were subsequently re-recorded/remixed/edited for the Elemental album released on 7 April 1998.

The 1997 version of "Sweet Pandemonium" was made available as a digital download.

== Happy Landings 1997 five-track EP ==
A limited edition (1000 copies) five-track EP of "tracks from the forthcoming album Happy Landings" was pressed and made available for sale on the band's tour commencing on 10 July 1997. The versions of these five tracks are unique to this EP, except for "Two Different Views" and "Going Without", which also appeared on the 3 July 2001 re-release of the "Missing Links" compilation on the Fuel 2000 label. This version of "Two Different Views" also appeared on the Ultimate Collection compilation album released on 9 November 1999.

1. "Two Different Views" – 5:50
2. "Going Without" – 4:58
3. "Happy Landings" – 5:03
4. "Freeman" – 4:33
5. "We Once Held Hands" – 8:23
- Produced and engineered by Martin Rex
- Additional production and mixing by Stephen W. Tayler and Sadia
- Executive production: Sadia
- Mastered at Metropolis Studios, London
- Mastering engineer: Ian Cooper
- Management: Jeff Neben / Axis Management
- All songs written by the Fixx
- Hit & Run Music Publishing Inc. JARC Ltd.
- (ASCAP) 1997 Administration by Warner Chappell Music
- Hit & Run Music MMR8080

== Additional notes ==
Happy Landings and Lost Tracks is the first release to include all ten session tracks as originally recorded in 1996, five* for the first time, although "Modern World" and "Elected" had previously been available as digital downloads.

Of the ten tracks re-recorded/remixed with Stephen W. Tayler and Sadia Sadia in early 1997, only "Modern World", "Lonely As A Lighthouse", "Ocean Blue" and "Life's What's Killing Me" remain unreleased.

A new version of “Lonely As A Lighthouse” was recorded and released on the Every Five Seconds album on 3 June 2022.

"House Arrest" and "Peace Louise" remain unreleased in any form and are "lost" tracks.

An earlier (1991–1994) recorded version of "Mayfly" (written by Cy Curnin and Stuart Zaltz) appears on the same-titled first solo album by Cy Curnin released on 22 February 2005.

== Track listing ==
1. "Modern World" – 4:08*
2. "Going Without" – 4:41
3. "Freeman" – 6:06*
4. "Elected" – 2:54*
5. "Mayfly" – 5:42*
6. "Two Different Views" – 5:11
7. "Ocean Blue" – 6:05
8. "We Once Held Hands" – 7:48
9. "Sweet Pandemonium" – 4:01*
10. "Happy Landings" – 4:25

== Personnel ==
- Cy Curnin – lead vocals, guitar
- Adam Woods – drums
- Rupert Greenall – keyboards, vocals
- Jamie West-Oram – guitar, vocals

Additional personnel

- Jeff Scantlebury — percussion
- Dennis Bovell — bass on "Going Without", "Freeman" and "We Once Held Hands"
- Dan K. Brown — bass on "Mayfly" and "Sweet Pandemonium"; Suzaphone on "Elected"
- Chris Tait — bass on "Modern World"
- Matthew Kleinman and Jason McDermot — brass on "Freeman" and "Elected"
- Liz Skillings — background vocals on "Ocean Blue"

== Production ==
- Produced and engineered by Martin Rex (mixed by Martin Rex at Howard Jones' shed on a Euphonix console)
- Mastered by Steve Hall at Future Disc
- All songs written by the Fixx
- All songs published by Yadu Music Inc. (ASCAP)
