= Pick Up a Bone =

Studio album by Rupert Hine
- Released: 1971
- Length: 49:34
- Label: Purple (original UK release); Capitol (original US release); Line (1988 German CD reissue); Repertoire (1997 German CD reissue); Air Mail Archive (2008 Japanese CD reissue)
- Producer: Roger Glover

Rupert Hine chronology
Pick Up a Bone (1971)	Unfinished Picture (1973)

Professional ratings
Review scores
Source	Rating
AllMusic	3/5 stars

Pick Up a Bone is the first album by Rupert Hine, released in 1971. Pick Up a Bone was the only album by Hine that he did not produce himself.

== Reception ==
In its obituary of Hine, The Guardian wrote that "listeners remained un-stirred by [the album's] somewhat gauche folk-rock."

== Track listing ==
All compositions by Rupert Hine (music) & David MacIver (lyrics), except "Pick up a Bone" (music by Rupert Hine & Simon Jeffes).

1. "Landscape"
2. "Ass All"
3. "Me You Mine"
4. "Scarecrow"
5. "Kerosene"
6. "Running Away"
7. "Medicine Munday"
8. "More Than One, Less Than Five"
9. "Boo Boo's Faux Pas"
10. "Pick Up a Bone"
11. "Intense Muse"

== Personnel ==
All rhythm track arrangements:

- Paul Buckmaster

Orchestral arrangements

- Paul Buckmaster (3,4,5 & 8)
- Peter Robinson (2 & 7)
- Del Newman (1)

Saxophone arrangement

- Simon Jeffes (9)

Director of the Orchestra

- David Katz

Rhythm section

- Rupert Hine — Vocals, Guitar, Harmonica
- Simon Jeffes — Acoustic, Electric & Slide Guitars
- David MacIver — Guitar
- Peter Robinson — Piano, Organ
- Pete Morgan — Acoustic & Electric Bass
- Terry Cox — Drums

Featured Musicians

- Clive Hicks, Eric Ford & Joe Moretti — Guitars
- Steve Hammond — Electric Guitar & Banjo
- Paul Buckmaster — Electric Cello
- Eddie Mordue & Roy Willox — Saxophone, Flute
- Raul Mayora — Congas, Bells & etc.
- Roger Glover — Tambourine
- Barry de Sousa — Drums & introducing—The MacIver-Hine Chorale
