= Unfinished Picture =

Studio album by Rupert Hine
- Released: 1973
- Label: Purple
- Producer: Rupert Hine

Rupert Hine chronology
Pick Up a Bone (1971)	Unfinished Picture (1973)	Immunity (1981)

Unfinished Picture is an album by Rupert Hine. It was originally released in 1973, by Purple Records, and re-released on CD in 1988 by Line Records. It was recorded at the Church of Saint Mary Magdalene, Paddington, London.

Music from the album was featured in the Anthony Stern film Wheel.

The album features contributions from Steve Nye and Simon Jeffes of Penguin Cafe Orchestra.

== Track listing ==
All music composed by Rupert Hine, all lyrics composed by David McIver; except where indicated

1. "Orange Song" (music by Hine, Simon Jeffes)
2. "Doubtfully Grey"
3. "Don't Be Alarmed"
4. "Where in my Life"
5. "Anvils in Five"
6. "Friends and Lovers'
7. "Move Along"
8. "Concord(e) Pastich(e)" (music by Hine, Simon Jeffes)
9. "On The Waterline"

== Personnel ==
- Rupert Hine - guitar, keyboards, vocals
- Simon Jeffes - guitar, bass
- John Perry - bass
- Steve Nye - piano
- Mick Waller - drums
- Mike Giles - drums
- John Punter - drums
- Ray Cooper - percussion
- Dave Cass - trumpet
- John Mumford - trombone
- The Martyn Ford Ensemble - strings
