= Immunity (Rupert Hine album) =

Studio album by Rupert Hine
- Released: 1981
- Studio: Farmyard Studios, Little Chalfont, UK
- Genre: Synthpop
- Label: A&M
- Producer: Rupert Hine, Stephen W. Tayler

Rupert Hine chronology
Unfinished Picture (1973)	Immunity (1981)	Waving Not Drowning (1982)

Professional ratings
Review scores
Source	Rating
Allmusic	4.5/5 stars

Immunity is a solo album by British musician Rupert Hine. Originally released in 1981, the album was re-released and digitally remastered in 2001. The album was dedicated to Liam Byrne. The song "Misplaced Love" features a brief chorus by British singer Marianne Faithfull.

== Track listing ==
All tracks composed by Rupert Hine and Jeannette Obstoj

1. "I Hang On to My Vertigo"
2. "Misplaced Love"
3. "Samsara"
4. "Surface Tension"
5. "I Think a Man Will Hang Soon"
6. "Immunity"
7. "Another Stranger"
8. "Psycho Surrender"
9. "Make a Wish"

Bonus tracks 2001 CD reissue

1. "Scratching at Success"
2. "Introduction to the Menace"

== Charts ==
Chart (1981)	Peak position
Australian (Kent Music Report)	22

== Personnel ==
- Rupert Hine – vocals, keyboards, instrumentation, sound processing
- Phil Palmer – guitar
- Phil Collins – percussion on "Immunity" and "Another Stranger"
- Marianne Faithfull – vocals on "Misplaced Love"
- Trevor Morais – drums on "I Think a Man Will Hang Soon", percussion on "Another Stranger" and "Make a Wish"
- Geoffrey Richardson – viola on "Make a Wish"
- Ollie W. Tayler – clarinet and recorder on "Psycho Surrender"

Technical

- Stephen W Tayler – engineering, mixing and co-production
- Michael Ross – art direction, design
- Chris Parker – photography, treatments
