= Waving Not Drowning =

Studio album by Rupert Hine
- Released: 1982
- Recorded: Farmyard Studios, Little Chalfont, Bucks
- Label: A&M
- Producer: Rupert Hine, Stephen W. Tayler

Rupert Hine chronology
Immunity (1981)	Waving Not Drowning (1982)	The Wildest Wish to Fly (1983)

Professional ratings
Review scores
Source	Rating
Allmusic	3/5 stars

Waving Not Drowning is a solo album by Rupert Hine. It was originally released in 1982, A&M Records, and re-released on CD in 2001, VoicePrint. "The Sniper" was dedicated to Liam Byrne and "House Arrest" was dedicated to Donald Woods. The album title alludes to the Stevie Smith poem, Not Waving but Drowning.

== Track listing ==
Music composed by Rupert Hine; lyrics by Jeannette Obstoj

1. "Eleven Faces"
2. "The Curious Kind"
3. "The Set Up"
4. "Dark Windows"
5. "The Sniper"
6. "Innocents in Paradise"
7. "House Arrest"
8. "The Outsider"
9. "One Man's Poison"
10. "Kwok's Quease" (Bonus CD track. Originally B-side of "The Set Up" single)

== Personnel ==
- Rupert Hine - keyboards, drums, vocals
- Phil Palmer - guitar
- Geoffrey Richardson - guitar, viola
- Phil Collins - drums, marimba, timbales
- Steve Negus - drums
- Trevor Morais - drums
- Ollie W Tayler - saxophone, clarinet, recorder
- Chris Thompson - additional vocals
- Stephen W Tayler - engineering, mixing, co-production
