= Walkabout (The Fixx album) =

Studio album by the Fixx
- Released: 19 May 1986
- Recorded: November 1985
- Studio: Farmyard, Little Chalfont, Buckinghamshire, England
- Genre: New wave
- Length: 48:32
- Label: MCA
- Producer: Rupert Hine

The Fixx chronology
| Phantoms (1984) | Walkabout (1986) | React (1987) |

Singles from Walkabout
- 1. "Secret Separation" Released: 12 May 1986 (US); 2. "Built for the Future" Released: 25 August 1986 (US)

Walkabout is the fourth studio album by the English new wave band the Fixx, released by MCA Records in the US on 19 May 1986, followed by a UK release on 15 September 1986. The first single, "Secret Separation", spent two weeks atop the Billboard Album Rock Tracks chart in July 1986; it was the band's second No. 1 single on the chart.

== Production ==
The album was produced by Rupert Hine. Singer Cy Curnin started working on the album while temporarily living in Africa. Walkabout was the first album to include bass player Danny Brown as an official member of the band.

== Critical reception ==
Professional ratings
Review scores
| Source | Rating |
|---|---|
| AllMusic | 3.5/5 stars |
| The Encyclopedia of Popular Music | 3/5 stars |
| MusicHound Rock: The Essential Album Guide | 2.5/5 stars |
| The Rolling Stone Album Guide | 2/5 stars |

The Ottawa Citizen called the album "the most well-rounded, honest effort by the group so far, marked by a deliberate attempt to 'uncomplicate' the group's sound, without sacrificing the poignancy of the social messages in the songs." The Los Angeles Times called the album the band's best to that point, writing that "the LP's uninventive slices of quirky new wave, tentative funk and Bowie impersonations could have been worse." The Sun Sentinel wrote that "the Fixx is capable of creating polished but ultimately passionless and perfunctory pop-funk ... this is not a record that anyone's going to remember five years from now."

== Track listing ==
All songs are written by Dan K. Brown, Cy Curnin, Rupert Greenall, Jamie West-Oram, and Adam Woods, except when noted.

1. "Secret Separation" (Brown, Curnin, Greenall, Jeannette Obstoj, West-Oram, Woods) - 3:51
2. "Built for the Future" - 4:07
3. "Treasure It" - 4:38
4. "Chase the Fire" - 4:27
5. "Can't Finish" - 4:09
6. "Walkabout" - 4:35
7. "One Look Up" - 4:15
8. "Read Between the Lines" - 3:59
9. "Sense the Adventure" - 3:42
10. "Camphor" - 3:53 [with hidden CD track "Peace on Earth (Do What You Can)" - 10:46]

== Personnel ==
The Fixx

- Cy Curnin – lead vocals, backing vocals, acoustic piano
- Rupert Greenall – keyboards
- Jamie West-Oram – guitars, backing vocals
- Dan K. Brown – bass guitar
- Adam Woods – drums

Additional personnel

- The TKO Horns:
  - Brian Maurice (credited as 'Brian Morris') – alto saxophone
  - Geoffrey Blythe – tenor saxophone
  - Jimmy Paterson – trombone
  - Dick Hanson – trumpet, solos (5, 7)
- Rupert Hine – backing vocals
- Lisa Dalbello – backing vocals (1)

Production

- Rupert Hine – producer
- Stephen W. Tayler – recording, mixing
- Andrew Scarth – technical assistant
- Georgina Rhodes – design
- Iain McKell – photography

== Charts ==
| Chart (1986) | Peak position |
|---|---|
| Australia Kent Music Report | 99 |
| US Billboard Top Pop Albums | 30 |

Singles

| Year | Single | Chart | Position |
|---|---|---|---|
| 1986 | "Built for the Future" | US Album Rock Tracks | 13 |
| 1986 | "Secret Separation" | US Billboard Hot 100 | 19 |
| 1986 | "Secret Separation" | US Album Rock Tracks | 1 |
