= Want That Life =

Studio album by the Fixx
- Released: 23 September 2003
- Recorded: 2003
- Genre: New wave, pop rock
- Length: 44:06
- Label: Rainman
- Producer: Martin Rex

The Fixx chronology
Ultimate Collection (1999)	Want That Life (2003)	Beautiful Friction (2012)

Professional ratings
Review scores
Source	Rating
Allmusic	4/5 stars

Want That Life is the ninth studio album by British new wave band the Fixx, released by US label Rainman Records on 23 September 2003.

== Track listing ==
All songs written by Cy Curnin, Rupert Greenall, Jamie West-Oram and Adam Woods.

1. "Touch" – 4:41
2. "You Don't Have to Prove Yourself" – 4:11
3. "Are You Satisfied?" – 5:49
4. "Want That Life" – 3:49
5. "We Don't Own the World" – 3:55
6. "No Hollywood Ending" – 3:53
7. "Straight 'Round the Bend" – 4:31
8. "Roger and Out" – 5:07
9. "Taking the Long Way Home" – 4:14
10. "Brave" – 3:56

== Personnel ==
- Cy Curnin - lead vocals
- Adam Woods - drums
- Rupert Greenall - keyboards
- Gary Tibbs - bass
- Jamie West-Oram - guitar

Additional personnel

- Erika Rundberg - backing vocals
- Jeff Scantlebury - percussion

== Production ==
- Producer: Martin Rex
- Engineer: Martin Rex
- Mixing: Martin Rex
- Mastering: Tim Young
- Assistant: Albert Pinheiro
- Programming: Martin Rex
- Art direction: Ed Spyra
- Design: Ed Spyra
- Photography: Lee Chambers, Jonah (Jana) Hendler, Ed Spyra
- Music Video (Single - 'Touch'): Lee Chambers
