= Elemental (The Fixx album) =

Studio album by the Fixx
- Released: 7 April 1998
- Recorded: 1997
- Genre: New wave, pop rock
- Length: 42:20
- Label: CMC; 06076 86244-2
- Producer: Martin Rex; The Fixx

The Fixx chronology
Ink (1991)	Elemental (1998)	1011 Woodland (1999)

Singles from Elemental
- 1. "Two Different Views" Released: 1998 (Germany/US promotional CD only); 2. "Is That It?" Released: 1998 (US promotional CD only)

Professional ratings
Review scores
Source	Rating
Allmusic	3/5 stars

Elemental is the seventh studio album by British new wave band the Fixx, released by CMC International Records in the US on 7 April 1998. The album was released in the UK by Sanctuary Records in 2001.

== Track listing ==
All songs are written by Cy Curnin, Rupert Greenall, Jamie West-Oram, and Adam Woods.

1. "Two Different Views" – 4:12
2. "Going Without" – 4:30
3. "Is That It?" – 3:54
4. "Happy Landings" – 4:22
5. "Silent House" – 4:08
6. "Fatal Shore" – 4:39
7. "Ocean Blue" – 4:51
8. "You Know Me" – 3:51
9. "We Once Held Hands" – 3:56
10. "Life's What's Killing Me" – 3:57

== Personnel ==
The Fixx

- Cy Curnin – vocals
- Rupert Greenall – keyboards
- Jamie West-Oram – guitars
- Adam Woods – drums

Additional personnel

- Chris Tait – bass (1–8, 10)
- Dennis Bovell – bass (9)
- Geoffrey Scantlebury – percussion (1, 4, 7, 9)
- Liz Skillings – vocals (1, 7)

== Production ==
- Joey Gmereck – executive producer, USA management
- Martin Stainton – executive producer, UK management
- The Fixx – producers
- Martin Rex – producer, engineer
- Sadia Sadia – additional production
- Chris Stone – engineer, additional recording
- Stacy Lafever – assistant engineer, additional recording assistant
- Steve Churchyard – mixing at Woodland Studios (Nashville, Tennessee)
- Tye Bellar – mix assistant
- John Zajdel – mix assistant
- Mike Childers – editing
- Don C. Tyler – digital editing
- Stephen Marcussen – mastering
- Precision Mastering (Hollywood, California) – editing and mastering location
- Mainartery – design
- Green Project – photography
- Chris O'Malley – USA management
