= Ink (The Fixx album) =

1991 studio album by British band The Fixx

Studio album by the Fixx
- Released: 19 February 1991
- Recorded: 1990–1991
- Studios: Behind The Ears Studios (Douglaston, New York); Electric Lady Studios (New York City, New York); Summa Studios (Hollywood, California); Enterprise Studios (Burbank, California); Metropolis Studios (London, UK)
- Genres: New wave, pop rock
- Length: 57:10
- Label: Impact Records
- Producers: Scott Cutler; Bruce Gaitsch; Rupert Hine; William Wittman

The Fixx chronology
| Calm Animals (1989) | Ink (1991) | Elemental (1998) |

Singles from Ink
- 1. "How Much Is Enough" Released: 4 February 1991 (US) 7 May 1991 (UK); 2. "No One Has to Cry" Released: June 1991 (Australia/US cassette and promotional CD only); 3. "Crucified" Released: 8 August 1991 (Germany)

Professional ratings
Review scores
| Source | Rating |
|---|---|
| AllMusic | 2/5 stars |
| The Rolling Stone Album Guide | 1.5/5 stars |

Ink is the sixth studio album by British new wave band the Fixx, released by Impact American in the US on 19 February 1991, followed by a UK release on 25 March 1991.

The single, "How Much Is Enough?", peaked at No. 35 on the Billboard Hot 100, reached No. 11 on the Billboard Mainstream Rock Tracks chart and No. 10 on the Modern Rock Tracks chart.

== Track listing ==
All lyrics written by Cy Curnin except where noted; all music composed by Curnin, West-Oram, Woods, Greenall and Brown except where noted.

1. "All Is Fair" - 4:34
2. "How Much Is Enough?" (Music: Curnin, West-Oram, Woods, Greenall, Brown, Ashley Hall, Scott Cutler) - 4:04
3. "No One Has to Cry" (Music: Curnin, West-Oram, Woods, Greenall, Brown, Cutler) - 4:02
4. "Crucified" (Music: Curnin, West-Oram, Woods, Greenall, Brown, Cutler) - 3:52
5. "Falling in Love" (Lyrics: Bill Champlin; Music: Bruce Gaitsch, Champlin) - 4:52
6. "Shut It Out" - 4:51
7. "Still Around" - 4:27
8. "All the Best Things" (Music: Curnin, West-Oram, Woods, Greenall, Brown, Carl Sturken, Evan Rogers) - 4:03
9. "Yesterday, Today" (Lyrics: Woods; Music: Curnin, West-Oram, Woods, Greenall, Brown) - 4:43
10. "One Jungle" (Lyrics: Jeannette Obstoj) - 3:59
11. "Climb the Hill" (Lyrics: Woods) - 4:28
12. "Make No Plans" (Music: Curnin, West-Oram, Woods, Greenall, Brown, Richard Termini) - 4:21
13. "Ships Are Safe In Harbour" - 3:38 [*]

* bonus track on Japan CD issue

== Personnel ==
The Fixx

- Cy Curnin – vocals
- Rupert Greenall – keyboards
- Jamie West-Oram – guitars
- Dan K. Brown – bass guitar
- Adam Woods – drums, vocals (11)

Additional personnel

- Steven MacKinnon – keyboards (2)
- Richard Termini – acoustic piano (12), synthesizers (12)
- Rusty Anderson – guitars (2)
- Steve Dubin – drum programming (2)

Production

- Randy Nicklaus – executive producer (2, 5), production coordinator
- William Wittman – producer (1, 3, 4, 6, 7, 9–12)
- Scott Cutler – producer (2)
- Bruce Gaitsch – producer (5), recording (5)
- Rupert Hine – producer (8), recording (8)
- John Agnello – recording (1, 3, 4, 6, 7, 9–12), mixing (1, 3, 4, 6, 7, 9–12)
- Tony Peluso – remixing (1, 3–6), mixing (2, 5)
- Andrew Sedgewick – MIDI informant (1, 3, 4, 6, 7, 9–12)
- Dennis Mackay – engineer (2)
- Stephen W. Tayler – engineer (8)
- Ed Korengo – assistant engineer (1, 3, 4, 6, 7, 9–12)
- Robin Levine – recording assistant (2)
- Fred Kelly – mix assistant (2, 5)
- Duane Sexton – mix assistant (2, 5)
- Matt Howe – assistant engineer (8)
- Steve Hall – mastering at Future Disc (Hollywood, California)
- Steve Barri – production coordinator
- Mark Sullivan – production coordinator
- Frenchy Gauthier – art direction
- Ria Lewerke – art direction
- Norman Moore – design
- Joan Brossa – original cover art
- Steve Rapport – photography

== Charts ==
| Chart (1991) | Peak position |
|---|---|
| US Billboard 200 | 111 |

Singles

| Year | Single | Chart | Position |
|---|---|---|---|
| 1991 | "How Much Is Enough?" | US Billboard Hot 100 | 35 |
| 1991 | "How Much Is Enough?" | US Mainstream Rock | 11 |
| 1991 | "How Much Is Enough?" | US Modern Rock | 10 |
