= Shuttered Room =

Studio album by the Fixx
- Released: 14 May 1982
- Recorded: 1981–1982
- Genre: Synth pop
- Length: 38:45
- Label: MCA
- Producer: Rupert Hine

The Fixx chronology
Shuttered Room (1982)	Reach the Beach (1983)

Singles from Shuttered Room
- 1. "Lost Planes" Released: 17 April 1981; 2. "Some People" Released: 22 January 1982; 3. "Stand or Fall" Released: 26 March 1982; 4. "Red Skies" Released: 11 June 1982

Professional ratings
Review scores
Source	Rating
AllMusic	3/5 stars

Shuttered Room is the debut studio album by the British band the Fixx, released by MCA Records in the UK on 14 May 1982, followed by a US release in August 1982.

It contains the group's debut single (in the United States), "Stand or Fall", which hit the Top 10 of Billboard's Album Rock Tracks as well as No. 79 on the Hot 100. Its follow-up US single was "Red Skies". Both songs were aided by popular MTV music videos.

== Track listing ==
Shuttered Room has been released in a number of different configurations. Though the front cover artwork remains consistent across the releases, the tracks, track order, and even the credits can vary from release to release.

=== Original UK track listing (MCA Records FX 1001) ===
The UK version differs from the US (and later CD) release in a number of respects, including the fact that all the songs are credited to Curnin/West-Oram/Woods/Greenall/Barrett, with lyrics attributed to Cy Curnin only.

Side 1

1. "Some People" – 3:01
2. "Stand or Fall" – 4:00
3. "Cameras in Paris" – 3:52
4. "Shuttered Room" – 2:47
5. "The Fool" – 5:21

Side 2

1. "Lost Planes" – 3:23
2. "I Live" – 4:53
3. "Sinking Island" – 3:16
4. "Time in a Glass" – 3:32
5. "Red Skies" – 4:20

=== US track listing ===
On the US LP and subsequent CD version, "Sinking Island" and "Time in a Glass" are replaced by "I Found You" and "The Strain", both of which were previously released as UK B-side tracks (of the "Some People" and "Stand or Fall" singles, respectively), and the track order is resequenced. All songs are credited as being written by Charlie Barrett, Cy Curnin, Rupert Greenall, and Jamie West-Oram, except where noted.

Side 1

1. "I Found You" – 3:38
2. "Some People" – 3:00
3. "Stand or Fall" – 4:00
4. "The Strain" (Barrett, Curnin, Greenall, West-Oram, Adam Woods) – 3:33
5. "Red Skies" – 4:19

Side 2

1. "Lost Planes" – 3:20
2. "Cameras in Paris" – 3:57
3. "I Live" (Barrett, Curnin, Greenall, West-Oram, Woods) – 4:52
4. "Shuttered Room" (Barrett, Curnin, Greenall, West-Oram, Woods) – 2:46
5. "The Fool" – 5:20

A reissued CD version added two tracks, (including "Sinking Island", although this is the 'Special Extended Dance Mix' originally released as the B-side on the "Red Skies" 12" single, and a 1994 remix of "Stand or Fall"):

1. "Sinking Island" [*] (Barrett, Curnin, Greenall, West-Oram, Woods) – 4:33
2. "Stand or Fall" (Extended Mix) [*] (Barrett, Curnin, Greenall, West-Oram, Woods) – 4:48

=== 1996 European CD reissue (Repertoire REP 4598-WY) ===
The 1996 European CD compiles all the tracks from the various issues onto one CD.

1. "Sinking Island" (Special Extended Dance Mix) – 4:32
2. "I Found You" – 3:38
3. "Some People" – 3:00
4. "Stand or Fall" – 4:00
5. "Red Skies" – 4:20
6. "Lost Planes" – 3:20
7. "Cameras in Paris" – 3:57
8. "I Live" – 4:53
9. "Shuttered Room" – 2:46
10. "The Fool" – 5:21
11. "Time in a Glass" – 3:27
12. "The Strain" – 3:33
13. "Stand or Fall" (Extended Mix) – 4:52

== Personnel ==
- Cy Curnin – vocals
- Adam Woods – percussion, drums
- Rupert Greenall – keyboards
- Jamie West-Oram – guitar
- Charlie Barrett – bass

Production

- Producer: Rupert Hine
- Engineer: Stephen W Tayler
- Remastering: David Bard
- Sequencing: David Bard
- Design: Chris Parker
- Photography: Chris Parker
- Repackaging: Ken Davis

== Charts ==
Chart (1982–83)	Peak position
The Billboard 200	133
Australia Kent Music Report	77

Singles – Billboard (United States)

Year	Single	Chart	Position
1982	"Stand or Fall"	Mainstream Rock	7
1982	"Stand or Fall"	Billboard Hot 100	76
1983	"Red Skies"	Mainstream Rock	13
1983	"Red Skies"	Billboard Hot 100	101
