= Stand or Fall =

Single by the Fixx

from the album Shuttered Room
- B-side: "The Strain"; "Sinking Island" (US)
- Released: 26 March 1982
- Genre: New wave, synth-pop
- Length: 3:40 (7" single edit); 4:00 (album version)
- Label: MCA
- Songwriters: Cy Curnin, Jamie West-Oram, Adam Woods, Rupert Greenall, Charlie Barrett
- Producer: Rupert Hine

The Fixx singles chronology
"Some People" (1982)	"Stand or Fall" (1982)	"Red Skies" (1982)

"Stand or Fall" is a song by new wave/rock band the Fixx, released by MCA Records in the UK on 26 March 1982, followed by a US release on 5 August 1982. It was the third of four single releases from the group's debut album, Shuttered Room.

"Stand or Fall" became the group's first charting hit. In the United States, it peaked at number 76 on the Billboard Hot 100 singles chart and number 7 on the Top Rock Tracks chart. The song also charted in Australia (No. 33), Canada (No. 37) and the United Kingdom (No. 54).

== Themes ==
The song embodies the Cold War themes of tension and dread, with refrains such as Stand or fall, state your peace tonight and It's the Eurotheatre (fear).

Lead singer and co-songwriter Cy Curnin said that the song was formed as a response to the debate over the Trident UK nuclear programme and talk about the possibilities of limited nuclear exchanges in Germany. The central musical motif was a gloomy figure that Curnin found on the piano. As it happened, "Stand or Fall" was one of a number of New Wave songs to address Cold War anxieties. And it has been held that the song still has relevance into the 2020s.

Allmusic considers it one of the few superior tracks from the album.

== Music video ==
The music video features Cy Curnin singing in a house, before cutting to soldiers in combat during World War II alongside a tank. It ends with Curnin leading the men and tank with a white horse (representing peace).

== Charts ==
Chart (1982–83)	Peak position
Australia (Kent Music Report)	33
Canada RPM Top Singles	37
UK Singles (Official Charts Company)	54
US Billboard Hot 100	76
US Billboard Top Rock Tracks	7
US Cash Box Top 100	91
