= Secret Separation =

Single by the Fixx

from the album Walkabout
- B-side: "Sense the Adventure"; "Rediscover" (12" only)
- Released: 12 May 1986
- Recorded: 1985
- Genre: New wave
- Length: 3:51
- Label: MCA
- Songwriters: Dan K. Brown, Cy Curnin, Rupert Greenall, Jeannette Obstoj, Jamie West-Oram, Adam Woods
- Producer: Rupert Hine

The Fixx singles chronology
"Less Cities, More Moving People" (1985)	"Secret Separation" (1986)	"Built For the Future" (1986)

"Secret Separation" is a song by British new wave rock group the Fixx, released by MCA Records in the US on 12 May 1986, with a later UK release on 16 June 1986. It was the first single from their fourth studio album Walkabout. The single peaked at #19 on the US Billboard Hot 100 chart in July 1986 and peaked at No. 1 on the US Album Rock Tracks chart. The single also peaked at #39 in Canada and #83 in the United Kingdom.

== Music video ==
The music video features an actor sitting at a control panel observing the band playing in an abandoned building filled with random items.

== Track listing ==
7" vinyl

1. "Secret Separation" — 3:51
2. "Sense the Adventure" — 3:42

12" vinyl

1. "Secret Separation" — 7:00
2. "Sense the Adventure" — 3:42
3. "Rediscover" — 4:03

== Chart performance ==
Chart (1986)	Peak position
Canadian Singles Chart	39
UK Singles (Official Charts Company)	83
U.S. Billboard Hot 100	19
U.S. Billboard Album Rock Tracks	1
