= Calm Animals =

Studio album by the Fixx
- Released: 6 February 1989
- Recorded: 1988
- Studio: AIR (Salem, Montserrat)
- Genre: Rock
- Length: 37:45
- Label: RCA
- Producer: William Wittman

The Fixx chronology
React (1987)	Calm Animals (1989)	Ink (1991)

Singles from Calm Animals
- 1. "Driven Out" Released: January 1989 (US) 19 June 1989 (UK); 2. "Precious Stone" Released: April 1989 (Canada/US promotional release only)

Calm Animals is the fifth studio album by British band the Fixx, released by RCA Records on 6 February 1989. The single "Driven Out" gave them a No. 1 song on the Mainstream Rock Tracks chart in early 1989, and reached No. 55 on the Billboard Hot 100. The single "Precious Stone" reached the top 25 on the Mainstream Rock Tracks chart later that year. Calm Animals was the Fixx's only album to be released on RCA Records.

== Critical reception ==
Professional ratings
Review scores
Source	Rating
AllMusic	2.5/5 stars

Trouser Press noted that "the rock-oriented Calm Animals ... has no songs worth mentioning." The Washington Post wrote that the album "has some familiar moments when they recapture their old seductive combination of sin and synth, but the ska-funkincense that powered early Fixx has been flattened to pop-metal."

== Track listing ==
All songs are written by Cy Curnin, Adam Woods, Jamie West-Oram, Rupert Greenall, and Dan K. Brown, except where noted.

1. "I'm Life" – 3:19
2. "Driven Out" – 3:59
3. "Subterranean" – 3:43
4. "Precious Stone" (The Fixx, Woods) – 3:08
5. "Gypsy Feet" (Curnin, the Fixx) – 4:03
6. "Calm Animals" – 4:12
7. "Shred of Evidence" – 3:41
8. "The Flow" (Curnin, the Fixx) – 2:59
9. "World Weary" (Curnin, the Fixx) – 4:38
10. "Cause to Be Alarmed" (Curnin, the Fixx) – 3:46
11. "Never Mind What You Leave Behind" [*] (Curnin, the Fixx) – 3:17

* bonus track on 2001 CD re-issue

== Personnel ==
The Fixx

- Cy Curnin – lead vocals, guitars
- Rupert Greenall – keyboards, backing vocals
- Jamie West-Oram – lead guitars, backing vocals
- Dan K. Brown – bass guitar, fretless bass, backing vocals
- Adam Woods – drums, percussion, backing vocals

Production

- William Wittman – producer
- John Agnello – engineer
- Richard Moakes – second engineer
- David Thoener – mixing
- Ted Trewhella – mix assistant
- Ed Spyra – art direction
- Chris Parker – photography
- George Underwood – paintings

== Charts ==
Album - Billboard (United States)

Year	Chart	Position
1989	The Billboard 200	72

Singles - Billboard (United States)

Year	Single	Chart	Position
1989	"Driven Out"	Billboard Hot 100	55
1989	"Driven Out"	Mainstream Rock	1
1989	"Driven Out"	Modern Rock	11
1989	"Precious Stone"	Mainstream Rock	23
