= Red Skies =

Single by The Fixx

from the album Shuttered Room
- B-side: "Is It by Instinct" (7"); "Sinking Island" (Special Extended Dance Mix) (12")
- Released: 11 June 1982
- Genre: New wave; synth-pop
- Length: 3:30 (7" single edit); 4:20 (12" full length version)
- Label: MCA
- Songwriters: Cy Curnin; Rupert Greenall; Adam Woods; Charlie Barrett; Jamie West-Oram
- Producer: Rupert Hine

The Fixx singles chronology
"Stand or Fall" (1982)	"Red Skies" (1982)	"Saved by Zero" (1983)

Music video
- "Red Skies" on YouTube

"Red Skies" is a song by new wave/rock band the Fixx, released by MCA Records in the UK on 11 June 1982, followed by a US release on 20 January 1983. It was the fourth and final single from the group's debut album, Shuttered Room, and reached number 13 on Billboard's Album Rock Tracks, but peaked at number one on Billboard's Bubbling Under the Hot 100 chart in early 1983.

The song also charted in the Netherlands and the United Kingdom. It was later re-recorded for the band's 1987 album, React.

== Composition and recording ==
The song appeared on the Fixx's 1982 album Shuttered Room. The lyrics of "Red Skies" warn of an imminent nuclear holocaust.

== Release and reception ==
Cash Box called it "a sailor's and dancer’s delight," praising the "haunting and dreamy synthesizer effects," steady beat" and "powerful vocals."

"Red Skies" peaked at number 13 on the U.S. Hot Mainstream Rock Tracks chart, number 44 in the Netherlands and number 57 in the UK. Winda Benedetti of The Spokesman-Review said it was one "of the more cutting-edge pop [songs] of the time." Mark Spinn of the Orange County Register called it "the best of the band's moodier material." Bill Locey of the Los Angeles Times complimented the song's "memorable chorus". The Fixx performed the song on Saturday Night Live on February 18, 1984.

== Re-recording ==
According to drummer Adam Woods, MCA Records requested that the band re-record the song for their 1987 React album. "Nobody at MCA was really interested in the new things we wanted to do," Woods said. "They told us to re-do 'Red Skies,' and we gave in. We figured, 'All right, we'll give them exactly what they want, and it will bomb.' And sure enough, it did."

== Track listing ==
7-inch vinyl

1. "Red Skies" – 3:30
2. "Is It by Instinct" – 4:10

12-inch vinyl

1. "Red Skies" (Full Length [album] Version) – 4:19
2. "Sinking Island" (Special Extended Dance Mix) – 4:35

== Chart performance ==
Chart (1982–83)	Peak position
Netherlands (Dutch Top 40)	44
UK Singles (Official Charts Company)	57
US Billboard Bubbling Under the Hot 100	101
US Billboard Top Tracks	13
