= Beautiful Friction =

Studio album by the Fixx
- Released: 17 July 2012
- Recorded: 2010–2012
- Studio: Spacehouse Studio, London
- Genre: New wave, rock
- Length: 48:53
- Label: Kirtland
- Producer: Nick Jackson

The Fixx chronology
Want That Life (2003)	Beautiful Friction (2012)	Every Five Seconds (2022)

Singles from Beautiful Friction
- 1. "Anyone Else" Released: 26 June 2012; 2. "Shaman" Released: 6 August 2013

Professional ratings
Review scores
Source	Rating
Allmusic	link

Beautiful Friction is the tenth studio album by British New Wave band the Fixx, released by Kirtland Records in the US on 17 July 2012, followed by a release in Europe by German label Hypertension on 17 August 2012. The album marks the return of longtime bassist Dan K. Brown.

== Track listing ==
All songs written by Cy Curnin, Adam Woods, Jamie West-Oram, Rupert Greenall, and Dan K. Brown.

1. "Anyone Else" – 3:50
2. "Just Before Dawn" – 4:36
3. "Take a Risk" – 3:47
4. "Beautiful Friction" – 5:43
5. "What God?" – 4:14
6. "Second Time Around" – 4:16
7. "Follow That Cab" – 3:20
8. "Shaman" – 4:16
9. "Something Ahead of You" – 6:16
10. "Girl with No Ceiling" – 4:03
11. "Small Thoughts" – 4:35
12. "Wasted" (iTunes bonus track) – 3:41

== Personnel ==
The Fixx

- Cy Curnin – lead vocals
- Rupert Greenall – keyboards
- Jamie West-Oram – guitar
- Adam Woods – drums
- Dan K. Brown – bass

Production

- Producer: Nick Jackson
- Mixing: Stephen W. Tayler
- Mixing on "Anyone Else" and "Just Before Dawn": Mark Needham
- Mastering: Dave McNair
- Cover Artwork: George Underwood
- Additional artwork: Jack West-Oram
- Photography: Michele Martinoli
- Art Direction: Tommy Moore
