= One Thing Leads to Another =

Single by the Fixx

from the album Reach the Beach
- B-side: "Opinions" (7"); "Reach the Beach" (Dub) (12")
- Released: 18 August 1983 (US)
- Genre: New wave
- Length: 3:23 (remixed edited version); 3:18 (album version)
- Label: MCA
- Songwriters: Cy Curnin; Adam Woods; Jamie West-Oram; Rupert Greenall
- Producer: Rupert Hine

The Fixx singles chronology
"Saved by Zero" (1983)	"One Thing Leads to Another" (1983)	"The Sign of Fire" (1983)

Music video
- "One Thing Leads to Another" on YouTube

"One Thing Leads to Another" is a song by English new wave band the Fixx, released by MCA Records in the US on 18 August 1983, followed by a UK release on 23 September 1983. It was the second of three singles taken from the group's second studio album, Reach the Beach, and is one of their most successful singles, reaching number four on the US Billboard Hot 100 in November 1983. It also peaked at number two on the Billboard Rock Top Tracks chart and became a number-one hit in Canada. Vocalist Cy Curnin has described the song as an indictment of dishonest politicians.

== Reception ==
Cash Box said that the "uptempo, almost poppy feel is balanced by Cy Curnin’s strong vocalizing and the sobriety of the subject matter."

== Music video ==
The video, co-produced and directed by Jeannette Obstoj, begins at a science lab where Adam Woods is looking into a microscope observing a new dimension (the wrist shackle in the video on the wall is seen on the cover of Reach the Beach). It shows a dimension in a black tunnel with lights on top where Cy Curnin is dancing in a classy navy blue double-breasted suit and open-necked white shirt. He is then in a bright tube, wearing a gray sleeveless shirt with his arms and shoulders exposed. Then, in a blue tunnel, he is running with a Doberman pinscher. It ends with the tunnel in a three-dimensional angle to see throughout the tube with the band members singing the rest of the song.

== Personnel ==
- Cy Curnin – vocals
- Adam Woods – percussion, drums
- Rupert Greenall – keyboards
- Jamie West-Oram – guitar

Additional musicians

- Alfie Agius – bass

== Charts ==
=== Weekly charts ===
Chart (1983)	Peak position
Australia (Kent Music Report)	38
Canada Top Singles (RPM)	1
UK Singles (Official Charts)	86
US Billboard Hot 100	4
US Dance Club Songs (Billboard)	14
US Mainstream Rock (Billboard)	2

=== Year-end charts ===
Chart (1983)	Position
Canada Top Singles (RPM)	27

== See also ==
- List of number-one singles of 1983 (Canada)
