= Jeannette Obstoj =

British songwriter (1949–2015)

- Born: Jeannette-Thérèse Obstoj; 5 June 1949; Buckinghamshire, England
- Died: 26 March 2015 (aged 65)
- Occupation: Songwriter

Jeannette-Thérèse Obstoj (5 June 1949 – 26 March 2015) was a British songwriter, best known for her work as a lyricist, usually working in collaboration with musician Rupert Hine. The Hine/Obstoj team wrote songs for Tina Turner ("I Might Have Been Queen", "Break Every Rule"), Dusty Springfield ("Arrested by You"), and Wilson Phillips ("Eyes Like Twins"), as well as writing all the songs on Hine's solo albums Immunity, Waving Not Drowning and Wildest Wish to Fly, and on the three albums Hine released using the identity Thinkman. Obstoj also occasionally wrote lyrics for songs by The Fixx, including their 1986 hit "Secret Separation", with music for these tracks being credited to the band as a whole.

Obstoj also worked as a video producer/director, lensing several of Hine's video clips, as well as selected videos by The Fixx, including “Less Cities More Moving People”, “Stand or Fall” and “One Thing Leads to Another”.

Obstoj died on 26 March 2015 after a short and sudden illness.
