= Saved by Zero =

Single by the Fixx

from the album Reach the Beach
- B-side: "Going Overboard" (7"); "The Fool" (Live) (12")
- Released: 15 April 1983
- Recorded: 1982
- Genre: New wave; dance-rock
- Length: 3:23 (7" single edit); 3:40 (album version)
- Label: MCA
- Songwriters: Cy Curnin; Adam Woods; Jamie West-Oram; Rupert Greenall
- Producer: Rupert Hine

The Fixx singles chronology
"Red Skies" (1982)	"Saved by Zero" (1983)	"One Thing Leads to Another" (1983)

Music video
- "Saved by Zero" on YouTube

"Saved by Zero" is a song by the English new wave band the Fixx, released by MCA Records in the UK on 15 April 1983, followed by a US release on 12 May 1983. It was the lead single off their second studio album, Reach the Beach, and is one of the group's best known hits. Their signature song is the follow-up single "One Thing Leads to Another".

An extended 4:24 version of "Saved by Zero" is included as a bonus track on the 2003 reissue of Reach the Beach. The song was featured in the fourth season of TV series Breaking Bad.

== Composition and meaning ==
"Saved by Zero" features a repetitive, jittery staccato guitar riff and corresponding bass. It features a soothing yet haunting presentation with its ghostly vocals and dark atmosphere. Lyrically, "Saved by Zero" is a reference to the Buddhist mantra Śūnyatā. Fixx lead vocalist Cy Curnin reflected on its meaning in a 2008 interview:

It was about looking at your own life, not so much about amassing material things but about experiences that lend you to be blissful... The song was written from the point of view of the release you get when you have nothing left to lose. It’s sort of a meditation. It clears your head of all fears and panics and illusions and you get back to the basics, which is a Buddhist mantra, which I practiced back then, and which I still do. The idea of the song is how great it is to get back to zero.

== Music video ==
Brian Grant had been chosen by MCA to direct the music video for "Saved by Zero". While the label had previously been financially apprehensive with the Fixx, upon the rising commercial significance of music videos, a large budget was granted for "Saved by Zero", allegedly providing "lunches, massages, and fourteen stylists". The heavy price tag, however, ultimately persuaded MCA to financially lighten up in future endeavors.

The beginning of the video pays homage to the Orson Welles film classic Citizen Kane (1941). The videos sees Cy Curnin playing a painter who creates the artwork for Reach the Beach. He is stranded at a flat, and he reminisces about his childhood. Another scene features Curnin painting his naked torso with white and red acrylic paint tubes.

== Reception ==
"Saved by Zero" would become one of the Fixx's most popular songs and a concert staple. It has been described as having "acutely captured the paranoia of the Cold War in fearful lyrics." AllMusic's Stephen Thomas Erlewine named it an AMG Track Pick and called the song a "cool, robotic slice of synth pop." It spent sixteen weeks on the Billboard Hot 100, debuting at number 80 the week of 28 May 1983 and peaking at number 20 the week of 13 August 1983.

This song is featured in the seventh episode of the fourth season of TV series Breaking Bad.

== Personnel ==
The Fixx

- Cy Curnin – vocals
- Adam Woods – percussion, drums
- Rupert Greenall – keyboards
- Jamie West-Oram – guitar

Additional musicians

- Alfie Agius – bass

== Chart positions ==
Chart (1983–1984)	Peak position
Canada RPM Top Singles	45
US Billboard Hot 100	20
RT Singles Chart (RT Singles Official Charts Company)	2
US Top Rock Tracks	9

Chart (1999)	Peak position
RT Singles Chart (RT Singles Official Charts Company)	1

== Toyota advertising campaign ==
In 2008, a re-recorded version of the song was used in an American national advertising campaign for Toyota, touting a 0% annual percentage rate promotion. The ad was played at a high rotation during sporting events, and aired 42,000 times by October 26. This resulted in criticism online that the song was being overplayed, prompting the creation of a Facebook group, "Stop Playing Toyota's 'Saved By Zero' Commercial", and "Toyota: Saved by Mitsubishi?" The overwhelming distaste for the campaign was also noted by Time and Esquire. Despite the complaints, Toyota said that the ad was successful and that they would not cut short its scheduled run in November that year.

Cy Curnin noted his amusement at the irony of Toyota's using the song to boast 0% car financing. He enjoyed the royalty checks and renewed attention the song gave the Fixx, both good and bad, but disliked the rerecording, stating, "I would prefer to have been the one singing it...It’s a bit cheesy."
