= Rupert Hine =

British musician and producer (1947–2020)

- Hine in 1982

Background information
- Born: Rupert Neville Hine; 21 September 1947; Wimbledon, London, England
- Died: 4 June 2020 (aged 72) Wiltshire, England
- Occupations: Producer; musician; songwriter
- Instruments: Vocals; keyboards; guitar; drums; percussion
- Labels: Ariola; A&M; Purple
- Formerly of: Quantum Jump

Rupert Neville Hine (21 September 1947 – 4 June 2020) was an English record producer and musician. He produced albums for artists including Rush, Kevin Ayers, Tina Turner, Howard Jones, Saga, the Fixx, Bob Geldof, Thompson Twins, Stevie Nicks, Chris de Burgh, Suzanne Vega, Underworld, Duncan Sheik, Formula and Eleanor McEvoy. Additionally, Hine recorded eleven albums, including those billed under his own name, the pseudo-band name Thinkman, and as a member of the band Quantum Jump; with the latter, he achieved a number 5 hit on the UK Singles Chart in 1979, "The Lone Ranger". Additionally, he composed for film and television soundtracks, including the 1989 Ian Fleming biopic Goldeneye and the black comedy Better Off Dead.

== Early life ==
Hine was born in Wimbledon, London on 21 September 1947. He was the son of Maurice, a timber merchant, and Joan (née Harris), a Red Cross nurse. He grew up in a house full of music; his mother was an amateur ballet dancer and his father an amateur musician who also played drums in a jazz band when he was young. Hine's mother was convinced he would be an architect, but Hine's early ambition was to become a cartographer. Hine started playing in the school band at age 14 and played the mouth organ, mostly because it was the cheapest instrument to buy. He attended St John's School in Horsham, West Sussex, before he moved to King's College School in Wimbledon. He was musically self-taught.

== Career ==
In the early 1960s, Hine formed half of the folk duo Rupert & David with David MacIver. The duo performed in pubs and clubs and occasionally shared the stage with a then-unknown Paul Simon. The duo's one released single (on the Decca label in 1965) was a cover of Simon's "The Sound of Silence". The single was not a success, but was notable for featuring a young Jimmy Page on guitar and Herbie Flowers on bass. For several years Hine wrote songs with MacIver while working at temporary jobs, until he was helped by Deep Purple's bassist Roger Glover, whom Hine knew from Glover's previous band Episode 6. Hine and MacIver were signed to Deep Purple's Purple label. Glover produced Hine's first solo album, Pick Up a Bone (1971). Unfinished Picture (1973) followed, but neither album was successful. However, Hine now became increasingly in demand as an independent producer, first with the 1972 single "Who Is the Doctor", featuring Jon Pertwee narrating over the theme music from TV's Doctor Who. He then produced Yvonne Elliman's album Food of Love (1973), a second world war-themed compilation album called Colditz (1973), and Kevin Ayers's The Confessions of Dr Dream and Other Stories (1974).

In 1973, Hine, along with guitarist Mark Warner, bassist John G. Perry (then of Caravan) and drummer Trevor Morais (formerly of The Peddlers) formed the band Quantum Jump, releasing two albums, Quantum Jump (1976) and Barracuda (1977). After the re-release of the single "The Lone Ranger" (from Quantum Jump) became an unexpected UK Top five hit in 1979, a third album – Mixing, a reworking of tracks selected from the first two Quantum Jump albums – was released. That same year he produced Camel's album I Can See Your House from Here.

After Quantum Jump disbanded, Hine released a trilogy of albums under his own name, including Immunity (1981); Waving Not Drowning (1982); and The Wildest Wish to Fly (1983). The American release of Wildest Wish dropped two tracks, radically reworked two others and incorporated two tracks from 1981's Immunity – including "Misplaced Love", which featured a guest vocal by Marianne Faithfull and had been a minor hit in Australia, reaching number 14 on the chart. In 1985, Hine wrote and produced much of the soundtrack for the black comedy film Better Off Dead. Later he and composer Eric Serra wrote "The Experience of Love", the end title song for GoldenEye. His film soundtrack credits also include The Fifth Element (composed by Serra), and The Addams Family.

Hine obtained a number of credits with some of the biggest musicians of his era. In 1984, he topped the UK Albums Chart with Howard Jones' debut album, Human's Lib, and that same year enjoyed his most high-profile achievement with his work on Tina Turner's album Private Dancer, which established Turner as a solo star and sold 20 million copies. Hine produced the Grammy-winning single "Better Be Good to Me" as well as co-writing "I Might Have Been Queen".

In 1986, he created a solo project called Thinkman with a set of actors for stage performance. There were three albums released under this project: The Formula (1986), Life is a Full Time Occupation (1988), and Hard Hat Zone (1990). Thinkman is credited for one song on the Better Off Dead soundtrack, while Hine is credited for six.

In 1990, Hine and Kevin Godley worked together on the project "One World One Voice", a musical chain letter that travelled the world starting with Sting and Afrika Bambaataa in New York and ending 300 artists/musicians later, in Moscow. It was an environmental awareness album, and a two-hour television program, broadcast the same day to 650 million people worldwide.

In 1993, he joined with guitarist Phil Palmer, Paul Carrack, Steve Ferrone and Tony Levin to form the band Spin 1ne 2wo. The group released a self-titled project, made up of rock covers of songs by artists including Jimi Hendrix, The Who, Led Zeppelin, Blind Faith, Steely Dan and Bob Dylan. In 1994, Hine released The Deep End. In 2008, Hine oversaw the direction of the compilation album Songs for Tibet: The Art of Peace, and also contributed to it a remixed version of his song, "The Heart of the Matter" (from The Deep End). In 2008, during the Beijing Olympics, the album was iTunes third most downloaded around the globe. Hine wrote two songs for Le Cheshire Cat et moi, a 2009 CD by Nolwenn Leroy which was produced by Teitur Lassen.

In 2011, Hine launched Auditorius, a joint music publishing project with BMG Rights Management. In November of the same year, following a glowing citation from Bob Geldof, Hine was honoured by the APRS with a Sound Fellowship Award; presented to recognise special contributions to the 'Art, Science and Business of Recording'. Hine joined Joe Boyd, Clive Green, Bob Ludwig, Jimmy Page and Chris Thomas to receive the award from Sir George Martin, APRS President, who together with a group of past recipients; sound and music innovators, including Sir Paul McCartney, Peter Gabriel, Chris Blackwell, also holds a Fellowship Award.

In March 2015, Esoteric Recordings (part of Cherry Red Records) issued "Unshy on the Skyline", a compilation from a trio of albums Hine made between 1981 and 1983, Immunity, Waving Not Drowning and The Wildest Wish to Fly, complemented by the lyrics of poet and artist Jeannette-Thérèse Obstoj, and featuring guest contributions from musicians Robert Palmer, Phil Collins and guitarist Phil Palmer. The album has been re-mastered by sound engineer Stephen W Tayler, who had recorded, mixed and co-produced the original albums. To recognise the Dalai Lama's 80th birthday in July 2015, the Art of Peace Foundation commissioned Hine to produce Songs for Tibet II, to celebrate and honour the Dalai Lama's vision. A follow-up to the Grammy-nominated Songs for Tibet that Hine produced in 2008, artist contributions came from Sting, Peter Gabriel, Lorde, Kate Bush, Elbow, Duncan Sheik, Howard Jones, The Family Crest, Ed Prosek, Of Monsters and Men, Bob Geldof, Crystal Method, Rival Sons, Eleanor McEvoy and Hine himself.

In 2017, Hine was appointed Chairman of the Ivor Novello Awards, presented annually by The Ivors Academy (formerly the BASCA).

On 30 August 2019, Esoteric Recordings (part of Cherry Red Records) issued "Fighting Apathy With Shock", a "best of" chosen by Hine from his Thinkman project, the albums The Formula (1986), Life Is A Full Time Occupation (1988) and Hard Hat Zone (1990) all with lyrics by Jeannette Obstöj (1949-2015). Re-mastering of the collection is by Stephen W Tayler who co-produced the original albums. Although Hine performed nearly all the music himself, there are contributions from The Fixx's Jamie West-Oram, Stewart Copeland of The Police and Café Jacques' vocalist Chris Thomson.

Tina Turner, Stevie Nicks, Wilson Phillips and Dusty Springfield are among the artists who have recorded Hine's songs. Hine has also directed videos for the artists he has produced. He was an early adopter of electronic music production techniques, and Hine was a founding member of Music Producers Guild, the International MIDI Association and a member of the National Academy of Recording Arts and Sciences in the US. He has sat on the boards of committees for BASCA and the Ivors Academy.

Hine had quadruple bypass surgery in 2010 and was diagnosed with renal cancer the following year. He died at his home in Wiltshire on 4 June 2020 at the age of 72. He is survived by his wife Fay and his son Kingsley from a previous marriage.

At a London reception on 20 September 2023, Rupert was posthumously honoured by Ivors Academy with an award recognising 'exceptional people across the music industry who create positive change and champion music creators'. The inaugural Ivors Honour, also presented to Carla Marie Williams, Crispin Hunt and Kevin Brennan MP, replaces BASCA's Gold Badge Awards, last presented in 2019.

== Discography ==
=== Solo ===
Studio albums

- Pick Up a Bone (1971)
- Unfinished Picture (1973)
- Immunity (1981)
- Waving Not Drowning (1982)
- The Wildest Wish to Fly (1983)
- The Deep End (1994)

Soundtrack album

- Better Off Dead (1985)

Compilation album

- Unshy on the Skyline - The Best of Rupert Hine (2015)

=== Thinkman ===
Studio albums

- The Formula (1986)
- Life Is a Full-Time Occupation (1988)
- Hard Hat Zone (1990)

Compilation album

- Fighting Apathy with Shock - The Best of Rupert Hine as Thinkman (2019)

=== Quantum Jump ===
Studio albums

- Quantum Jump (1975)
- Barracuda (1977)

Compilation album

- Mixing (1979)

=== Spin 1ne 2wo ===
- Spin 1ne 2wo (1993)

== Production credits ==
- Rupert Hine – "Snakes Don't Dance Fast" (single) (1976)
- Rupert Hine – The Shout (soundtrack) (1979)
- Rupert Hine – Immunity (album) (1981)
- Rupert Hine – Waving Not Drowning (album) (1982)
- Rupert Hine – The Wildest Wish to Fly (album) (1983)
- Rupert Hine – The Deep End (album) (1994)
- Rupert Hine - "Unshy on the Skyline" (album) (2015)
- Rupert Hine - "Fighting Apathy With Shock" (album) (2019)

- Rupert Hine and Simon Jeffes – Score (TV music) (1973)
- Rupert Hine and Simon Jeffes – The Kenny Everett Video Show (TV music) (1978)
- Rupert Hine and Various Artists – Better Off Dead (soundtrack) (1985)

- Various Artists – Colditz Breakpoint (album) (1973)
- Various Artists – First Offenders (album) (1980)
- Various Artists – Secret Policeman's Third Ball (tracks) (1987)
- Various Artists – One World One Voice (album) (1990)
- Various Artists – One Week or Two in the Real World (tracks) (1994)
- Various Artists – Welcome to Woop-Woop (tracks) (1998)

- Quantum Jump – Quantum Jump (album) (1974)
- Quantum Jump – Barracuda (album) (1977)
- Quantum Jump – Mixing (album) (1979)

- John G. Perry – Sunset Wading (album) (1975)
- John G. Perry – Seabird (album) (1976)

- Café Jacques – Round the Back (album) (1977)
- Café Jacques – International (album) (1978)

- Anthony Phillips – Wise After the Event (album) (1977)
- Anthony Phillips – Sides (album) (1978)

- Saga – Worlds Apart (album) (1981)
- Saga – Heads or Tales (album) (1983)

- The Fixx – Shuttered Room (album) (1981)
- The Fixx – Reach the Beach (album) (1983)
- The Fixx – Phantoms (album) (1984)
- The Fixx – Walkabout (album) (1986)
- The Fixx – Ink (tracks) (1990)

- The Waterboys – "A Girl Called Johnny" (single) (1983)
- The Waterboys – "December" (single) (1983)

- Chris De Burgh – The Getaway (album) (1982)
- Chris De Burgh – Man on the Line (album) (1984)
- Chris De Burgh – Power of Ten (album) (1992)

- Tina Turner – Private Dancer (tracks) (1984)
- Tina Turner – Break Every Rule (tracks) (1986)
- Tina Turner – Foreign Affair (tracks) (1989)

- Howard Jones – Human's Lib (album) (1984)
- Howard Jones – The 12″ Album (album) (1984)
- Howard Jones – Dream into Action (album) (1985)
- Howard Jones – Action Replay (album) (1986)
- Howard Jones – In the Running (album) (1992)

- Thinkman – The Formula (album) (1986)
- Thinkman – Life Is a Full Time Occupation (album) (1988)
- Thinkman – Hard Hat Zone (album) (1990)

- Bob Geldof – Deep in the Heart of Nowhere (tracks) (1986)
- Bob Geldof – The Vegetarians of Love (album) (1990)
- Bob Geldof – The Happy Club (album) (1992)

- Rush – Presto (album) (1989)
- Rush – Roll the Bones (album) (1991)

- Éric Serra – GoldenEye (tracks) (1996)
- Éric Serra – The Fifth Element (tracks) (1997)
- Éric Serra – RXRA (album) (1998)

- Duncan Sheik – Duncan Sheik (album) (1996)
- Duncan Sheik – Humming (album) (1998)

- Songs for Tibet, album plus underlying remix The Heart of the Matter (2008)
- Songs for Tibet II, album plus You Can't Be Chased, Ostinato Mix (2015)

- Jon Pertwee – "Who Is the Doctor" (single) (1972)
- Yvonne Elliman – Food of Love (album) (1973)
- Jonesy – Growing (album) (1974)
- Kevin Ayers – The Confessions of Dr. Dream and Other Stories (album) (1974)
- Nova – Blink (album) (1976)
- Dave Greenslade – Cactus Choir (album) (1976)
- Steve Tilston – Songs from the Dress Rehearsal (album) (1976)
- After the Fire – Laser Love (album) (1978)
- Murray Head – Between Us (album) (1979)
- Camel – I Can See Your House from Here (album) (1979)
- Wildlife – Burning (album) (1979)
- The Members – The Choice is Yours (album) (1980)
- Jona Lewie – Heart Skips Beat (album) (1981)
- The Little Heroes – Watch the World (album) (1983)
- Martin Ansell – The Englishman Abroad (album) (1986)
- Eight Seconds – Almacantar (album) (1986)
- Thompson Twins – Close to the Bone (album) (1987)
- Underworld – Underneath the Radar (album) (1987)
- Rebel Heels with Liz Larin – One by One by One (album) (1987)
- The Joan Collins Fan Club – "Leader of the Pack" (single) (1988)
- Stevie Nicks – The Other Side of the Mirror (album) (1989)
- Bliss – A Change in the Weather (album) (1990)
- Remmy Ongala – Mambo (album) (1992)
- Spin 1ne 2wo – Spin 1ne 2wo (album) (1993)
- Katey Sagal – Well... (album) (1994)
- Milla Jovovich – The Divine Comedy (tracks) (1994)
- Les Négresses Vertes – Zig Zague (album) (1994)
- Touch! – Marche avec moi (album) (1994)
- This Picture – City of Sin (tracks) (1994)
- Ezio – Black Boots on Latin Feet (album) (1995)
- Noa – Calling (album) (1996)
- Marian Gold – United (album) (1996)
- Celtus – Moonchild (album) (1997)
- Thanks to Gravity – Start (album) (1997)
- Eleanor McEvoy – Snapshots (album) (1999)
- Stroke 9 – Nasty Little Thoughts (album) (1999)
- Rat Bat Blue – Greatest Hits – Vol. 2 (The Hungry Years) (album) (1999)
- Geoffrey Oryema – Spirit (album) (2000)
- Suzanne Vega – Songs in Red and Gray (album) (2001)
- Ra – From One (album, uncredited) (2002)
- Teitur – Poetry & Aeroplanes (album) (2003)
- Martin Grech – Unholy (album) (2005)
- Amanda Ghost – "Time Machine" (single) (2006)
- Stuart Davis – ¿What (album) (2006)
- T.D. Lind – Let's Get Lost (album) (2007)
- Echo Echo – Fall Like You're Flying (album) (2010)
