= The Fixx =

English rock band

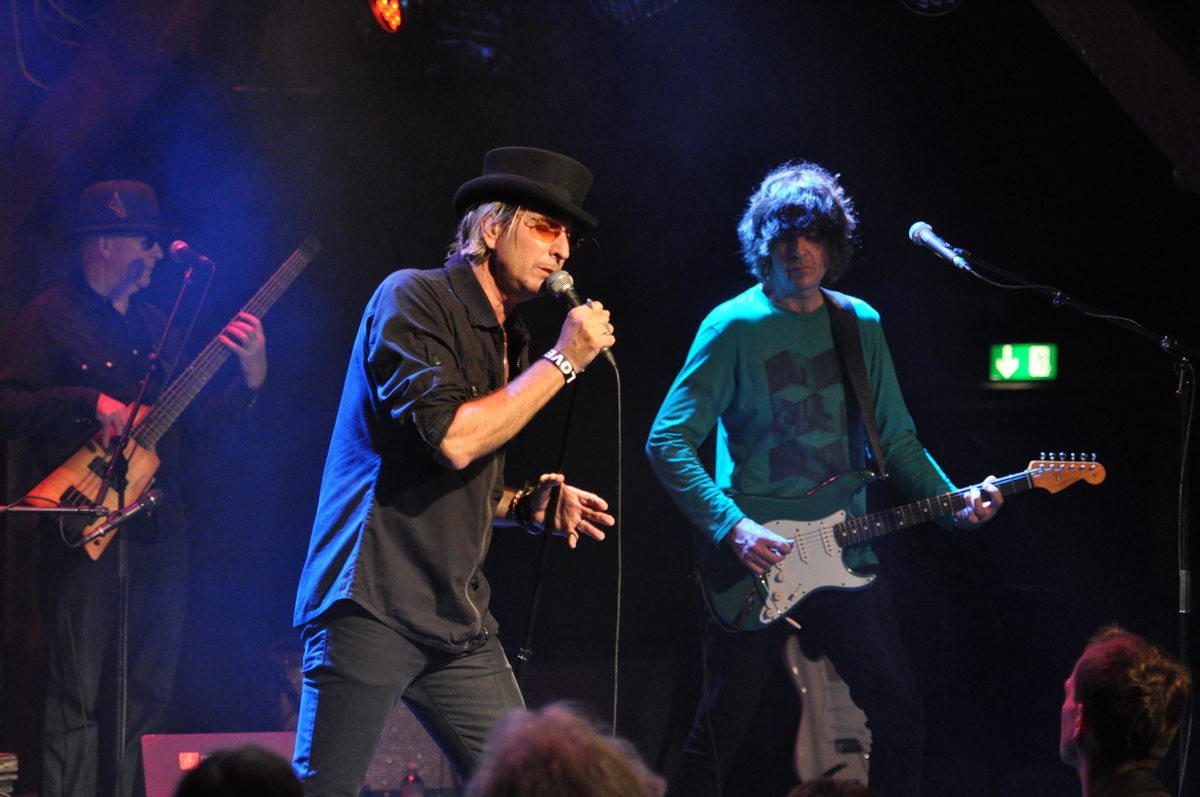
- The Fixx performing in Hamburg, 2012

Background information
- Also known as: Portraits (1979–80); The Fix (1980–81)
- Origin: London, England
- Genres: New wave; dance-rock; pop rock; art rock
- Years active: 1979–present
- Labels: Kirtland; MCA; RCA
- Members: Cy Curnin; Adam Woods; Rupert Greenall; Jamie West-Oram; Dan K. Brown
- Past members: Tony McGrail; Russell Mckenzie; Charlie Barrett; Alfie Agius
- Website: Official website

The Fixx are a rock band from London, England, founded in 1979. The band's hits include "One Thing Leads to Another", "Saved by Zero", "Are We Ourselves?", and "Secret Separation", each of which charted in the top 20 of the Billboard Hot 100, as well as Mainstream Rock chart hits "Red Skies", "Stand or Fall", "Driven Out" and "Deeper and Deeper", which was featured on the soundtrack of the 1984 film Streets of Fire.

== Early years as Portraits and The Fix (1979–1981) ==
College friends Cy Curnin on vocals and Adam Woods on drums formed the group in London in 1979, initially calling themselves Portraits. The pair placed an ad for additional members, and recruited keyboardist Rupert Greenall, guitarist Tony McGrail and bassist Russell McKenzie, the last of whom was later replaced by Charlie Barrett. Portraits issued two singles for Ariola Records: "Little Women" (1979), and "Hazards In The Home" (1980).

Later in 1980, McGrail left. At this point, the band added guitarist Jamie West-Oram (formerly of Phillip Rambow's band) and changed their name to The Fix. This version of the band recorded for 101 Records, releasing their first single ("Lost Planes") in April 1981. This track, along with several live tracks issued by 101 on various compilations, received some radio exposure on the BBC. In these early days, West-Oram was billed simply as 'Jamie West'.

The Fix's raised profile eventually led to the group being offered a contract by MCA Records. Worried about the potential drug-user implication of the band's name, MCA insisted on a name change before signing them to the label. A compromise was reached as the band altered the spelling of their name to The Fixx.

== MCA and RCA years (1982–1991) ==
Barrett left The Fixx just after the recording of their first album, Shuttered Room, in 1982. This album featured the band's initial hits, "Stand or Fall" and "Red Skies", both of which charted in the U.S. and the U.K. The band found particular success in Canada, where "Stand or Fall" reached No. 37. "Stand or Fall" entered the charts in the U.S. on 30 October 1982.

Barrett was replaced on bass by Alfie Agius for the Shuttered Room tour. Agius' stay in the band was short-lived, though, as he left during the 1983 recording of their next album Reach the Beach, after having recorded four tracks. Agius is credited as co-writer on all the album's tracks, but the group for this album was officially credited as a quartet (Curnin, Greenall, West-Oram and Woods). Agius went on to briefly tour with the hard rock/heavy metal band Fastway that same year.

Reach the Beach, produced by star producer Rupert Hine, became the group's most commercially successful album and was certified Platinum by the RIAA on 5 January 1984. Agius' bass work is featured on the album's first two singles "Saved by Zero" and "One Thing Leads to Another." Both these singles cracked the US top 40, and "One Thing Leads to Another" became the band's biggest-ever hit (no. 1 Canada, no. 4 US). It was during these sessions that bassist Dan K. Brown joined the band. Brown played bass on the third top 40 single from the album, "The Sign of Fire" and continued with the band on its subsequent tour. Brown became a full member of the band thereafter.

Curnin and West-Oram played on "I Might Have Been Queen" and "Better Be Good to Me" by Tina Turner on her 1984 album Private Dancer.

The 1984 album Phantoms contained the hits "Are We Ourselves?" (#29 Can.), the first video in which a mobile phone ever appeared (a modified Motorola KR999), and "Sunshine In The Shade." Another single, "Deeper And Deeper," was initially released as the B-side of "Are We Ourselves?" (and also appeared in an edited version on the soundtrack for the film Streets of Fire) as well as on the extended 12" version of "Less Cities, More Moving People" in the UK. This track received substantial airplay on U.S. and Canadian modern rock radio stations.

In 1985 the Fixx recorded the song "A Letter to Both Sides" for the soundtrack of the film Fletch. In 1986, they released their fourth album, Walkabout, featuring "Secret Separation" (No. 1 on Billboard Magazine's "Album Rock" chart, No. 49 in Canada) and "Built for the Future." The 1987 album React, was a compilation of both live and new studio material, after which the band would depart MCA Records.

In 1989, the Fixx released their first album in nearly three years and only release on RCA Records, Calm Animals, which contained another hit "Driven Out" (another No. 1 on Billboard's "Album Rock" chart).

The band signed to Impact (Distributed by MCA) for their next album, 1991's Ink. The album featured "How Much Is Enough?" (No. 27 Canada, No. 35 US).

== Recent years (1992–present) ==
Dan K. Brown took a hiatus from the band in 1994. He was not officially replaced, and the band used session musicians on bass in his stead, with Chris Tait playing bass on most recordings and live shows from 1995 through the early 2000s. The four-man line-up (with contributions from Tait and other sessioneers) recorded 1998's Elemental, as well as the 1999 album 1011 Woodland, on which they re-recorded a selection of previous hits and album tracks.

In 2002, the Fixx performed Nancy Sinatra's 1960s classic "These Boots Are Made for Walkin'" for an album of cover versions of songs from the 1960s to 1990s called When Pigs Fly.

In 2003, the band released their ninth studio album, Want That Life. Gary Tibbs (formerly a member of Roxy Music, The Vibrators and Adam and the Ants) played bass for this album.

Long-time bassist Dan K. Brown rejoined the band in 2008, replacing Tibbs. They celebrated 25 years of making music together, with the release of the double-CD Twenty-fifth Anniversary Anthology compilation.

With the classic lineup back intact, the Fixx released their 10th studio album, Beautiful Friction, on 17 July 2012. The Fixx regularly tour the world.

On 5 November 2021, The Fixx announced on their website a new single called "Wake Up". The song also featured on their most recent album, Every Five Seconds, released 3 June 2022. "Woman of Flesh and Blood" and "Closer" are two more singles from the album.

On 10 November 2023, the band released a newly recorded single "Winter's Time," backed with "Someone Like You," a track recorded initially during the Every Five Seconds sessions.

== Band members ==
Current members

- Cy Curnin – lead vocals, occasional piano and guitars (1979–present)
- Adam Woods – drums, percussion (1979–present)
- Rupert Greenall – keyboards, backing vocals (1979–present)
- Jamie West-Oram – guitars, backing vocals (1980–present)
- Dan K. Brown – bass, backing vocals (1983–94, 2008–present)

Former members

- Tony McGrail – guitars, backing vocals (1979–80) (Portraits)
- Russell Mckenzie – bass, backing vocals (1979–80) (Portraits)
- Charlie Barrett – bass, backing vocals (1980–82)
- Alfie Agius – bass, backing vocals (1983)

Touring/session members

- Dennis Bovell – bass (1994–98)
- Chris Tait – bass (1998–2002)
- Gary Tibbs – bass, backing vocals (2002–08)

== Discography ==
- Shuttered Room (1982)
- Reach the Beach (1983)
- Phantoms (1984)
- Walkabout (1986)
- Calm Animals (1989)
- Ink (1991)
- Happy Landings & Lost Tracks (1996)
- Elemental (1998)
- 1011 Woodland (1999)
- Want That Life (2003)
- Beautiful Friction (2012)
- Every Five Seconds (2022)
