= Cy Curnin =

English singer-songwriter (born 1957)

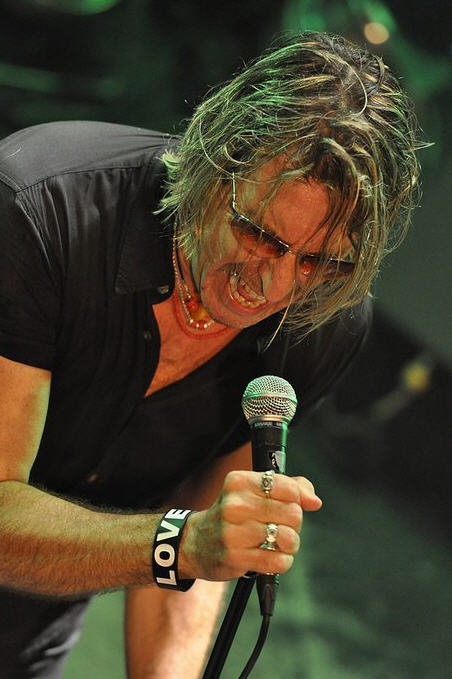
- Curnin in 2012

Background information
- Born: Cyril John Curnin; 12 December 1957 (age 68); Wimbledon, England
- Genres: New wave; pop rock; art rock
- Occupation: Singer
- Instruments: Vocals, piano, keyboards, guitar
- Years active: 1980–present
- Member of: The Fixx
- Website: www.cycurnin.com

Cyril John Curnin (born 12 December 1957) is an English singer-songwriter who serves as the lead vocalist for the new wave band, the Fixx. He has released five solo albums: Mayfly (2005), The Returning Sun (2007), Solar Minimum (2009), The Horse's Mouth (2013) and Lockdown (2020). His Cinema for the Blind EP (2012) explored ambient music, containing no vocals.

== Biography ==
=== Early life ===
Curnin left Wimbledon College, in England, at the age of 16. He then began participating in drama in college, where he studied with Fixx drummer Adam Woods.

=== Career ===
College friends Cy Curnin on vocals and Adam Woods on drums formed the group The Fixx in London in 1979, initially calling themselves Portraits, and then changed the name to The Fix and eventually to The Fixx when they got a contract with MCA Records.

The band's hits include "One Thing Leads to Another", "Saved by Zero", "Are We Ourselves?", and "Secret Separation", each of which charted in the Top 20 of the Billboard Hot 100, as well as mainstream rock chart hits "Red Skies", "Stand or Fall", "Driven Out" and "Deeper and Deeper", which was featured on the soundtrack of the 1984 film Streets of Fire.

In addition to singing lead vocals, Curnin has occasionally played piano or guitar on various Fixx albums.

In 1984, Curnin appeared in the Tina Turner music video "Better Be Good to Me" along with Fixx guitarist Jamie West-Oram and both appeared on the Private Dancer album.

As of 2023, The Fixx was still active and had released 12 albums, the last one being in 2022.

While Curnin tours regularly with The Fixx, he has also toured as a solo performer in the U.S. and in Europe. On occasion he has been joined by English singer/songwriter/guitarist Nick Harper. He was also the special guest of Midge Ure for gigs in Europe.

Curnin supports the music-based cancer charity, Love Hope Strength Foundation. With them, he has participated in treks to the base camp of Mt. Everest, Kilimanjaro, Machu Picchu, and Pikes Peak to raise awareness and funds for cancer treatment facilities in remote areas of the world.

=== Collaborations ===
Curnin provided vocals on Rupert Hine's "With One Look (The Wildest Dream)", which featured on the soundtrack to the 1985 Savage Steve Holland film, Better Off Dead.

In 1990, Curnin participated with Rupert Hine and many other artists in the world music album One World One Voice. He played piano and sang with many artists.

In October 2007, Curnin began an association with the Love Hope Strength Foundation (LHSF), a music-centric cancer charity. Cy joined with Mike Peters from The Alarm, Glenn Tilbrook from Squeeze, and Slim Jim Phantom from Stray Cats in a trek to perform at the base camp of Mount Everest in Nepal. Curnin has since participated in other LHSF treks to Machu Picchu, Pike's Peak, Mount Kilimanjaro and in December 2012, Curnin returned to Everest with the organization.

== Musical influences ==
Curnin's influences include David Bowie, The Beatles, Grover Washington Jr., Manitas De Plata and Pink Floyd.

== Personal life ==
Curnin lives in Santa Cruz, California.

== Solo discography ==
- 2005 – Mayfly
- 2007 – The Returning Sun
- 2009 – Solar Minimum
- 2012 – Cinema for the Blind – EP
- 2013 – The Horse's Mouth
- 2020 – Lockdown
- 2021 – Superseded – EP
