= Stephen W. Tayler =

Stephen W Tayler

Background information
- Born: Stephen William Tayler; 1953 (age 72–73); Buckinghamshire, United Kingdom
- Occupations: Sound engineer, mixer, music producer, musician, composer, digital artist
- Years active: 1974–present
- Website: Chimera Arts

Stephen W Tayler is an English mixing and recording engineer, music producer, musician, composer and sound designer who has contributed towards many albums for artists including Kate Bush, Suzanne Vega, Peter Gabriel, Underworld, Duncan Sheik, Howard Jones, Stevie Nicks, Milla Jovovich, Rush, Bob Geldof, Rupert Hine and Tina Turner. Tayler works closely with producer, filmmaker and artist Sadia Sadia. Starting with analogue and tape techniques, and subsequently an early adopter of synthesis, sampling and digital technology, he is based out of one of four long-term project spaces at Real World Studios in Wiltshire, England.

== Education ==
Tayler grew up studying and performing music professionally. At the age of eight he became a boy chorister at New College School, Oxford eventually becoming a soloist and head chorister. New College Choir made many recordings, and Choral Evensong was regularly Broadcast on the BBC. Having taken up the clarinet and piano, he gained a music scholarship to Shrewsbury School, followed by three years at the Royal College of Music in London studying the clarinet with Colin Bradbury and also studying organ. He taught himself to play the guitar and bass guitar, as well as playing saxophone, recorders and penny whistles. He played in many orchestras, ensembles, experimental groups and bands, but he felt that life as a performer was not for him. During all this time he had developed a fascination with recording, and had begun to experiment with tape recorders.

== Career ==
=== 1970s ===
Tayler decided to pursue a career in the audio world. He applied to the BBC for a post as a trainee, and was accepted, due to start several months after finishing at college. On 5 August 1974, a few days after his final term at college, he decided to go in search of a job to tide him over. Without any preparation he went for a stroll around London's Soho where there were many recording studios. By chance he turned off Wardour Street into St. Anne's Court, a small alleyway. He spotted a doorway with a sign for Trident Studios, so he stepped inside and enquired if there were any jobs available. He was immediately sent to see the studio manager, who told Tayler that he was too old and over qualified. Yet there was an opening for the post of tea boy. Tayler started the next day.

Trident Studios had become famous for the recording of many seminal albums from the late sixties and early seventies, including sessions by The Beatles, Elton John, David Bowie, T Rex etc. In his first few weeks, he found himself making tea and running errands for sessions with acts such as Queen, Elton John, Supertramp and Ace, with producers Roy Thomas Baker, Gus Dudgeon, Ken Scott and John Anthony.

After six months of gruelling work as one of Trident's tea boys, Tayler was promoted to become a tape op (assistant engineer). He assisted on sessions with T. Rex, Cockney Rebel, Mahavishnu Orchestra, Shakti, The Spiders From Mars, Chick Corea, Brand X, and many others. He developed close working relationships with producers Dennis MacKay and Robin Lumley in particular.

After eighteen months as an assistant, Tayler was asked to step in as engineer on a recording session, due to the illness of one of his seniors. The session required a single to be completely re-recorded and mixed from scratch in just three hours for a spot on Top of the Pops. After completing this task, Tayler became one of Trident's engineers.

As a recording and mixing engineer, he worked on albums with Tommy Bolin, Bill Bruford, U.K., Rod Argent, Claude Francois, Brand X and Peter Gabriel along with many others. After two years he had moved up the ladder and was appointed Trident's Chief Engineer. As the climate changed from fusion, progressive rock and pop to the late seventies disco boom, Tayler found himself helping to shape the European disco sound, with the relentless ‘in your face’ four-to-the-floor bass drum sound. It all became too formulaic, and Tayler decided to move on to new challenges.

=== 1980s ===
Shortly after this, he was introduced again to producer Rupert Hine, with whom he had worked as an assistant and an occasional engineer at Trident. He opted to become a freelance, which was rare in those days. He started to work with Rupert at Farmyard Studios, recording, mixing, co-producing and playing on Rupert's solo projects (five albums), and going on to work with him as his recording and mixing engineer on albums for The Fixx (four albums), Chris de Burgh (two albums), Saga (two albums), Howard Jones (three albums), Tina Turner (tracks on two albums), Jona Lewie, Thompson Twins, The Waterboys, Underworld and Bob Geldof.

Tayler also worked at Farmyard Studios with The Lords of the New Church, Jethro Tull, Trooper, Frozen Ghost, David Wilcox with producer Sadia Sadia, Honeymoon Suite, The Proclaimers, Judie Tzuke and T’Pau, as well as many others.

Tayler and Rupert began to travel internationally in the late eighties, and began working with artists such as Stevie Nicks in the US and Rush in Canada.

=== 1990s ===
In 1990, he travelled around the world together with Rupert Hine for the BBC production One World One Voice which recorded and filmed over 400 musicians on location. By stretching the studio technology of the day to the absolute limit, Tayler helped create a musical collage for the one-hour TV special, directed by Kevin Godley. The artists included Sting, Lou Reed, Dave Stewart, Suzanne Vega, Chrissie Hynde, Joe Strummer, The Kodo Drummers, Leningrad Symphony Orchestra, Wayne Shorter, Salif Keita, Eddy Grant and more. It was a gruelling task, but the results, both visually and musically, were extremely rewarding. The show, with its ecological themes, and a behind the scenes documentary were broadcast simultaneously to a television audience of over half a billion viewers.

During the nineties, Tayler's success as an engineer and mixer continued with the US mainstream hit "Barely Breathing" by Duncan Sheik, drawn from his debut album, and recordings with Milla Jovovich and Katey Sagal. He also continued his association with Bob Geldof and Rush working on further albums for both artists. Tayler began to work extensively in Europe with such acts as Éric Serra, Les Negresses Vertes, Noa (Achinoam Nini), Claudio Baglioni and Renato Zero. With musical/production collaborator Sadia Sadia, he formed the world music fusion outfit Equa (Polygram Australia) which produced the eponymously-titlled ARIA nominated album Equa. Equa's music has been sequenced to current affairs programmes, television programmes and films internationally, and their music forms the basis for two works by the Sydney Dance Company ("Cradle Song" and "Unwitting Sight").

=== 2000s–present ===
In 2000, Tayler teamed up again with his longstanding collaborator and partner, the producer Rupert Hine, to work on the album Songs in Red and Gray by Suzanne Vega. The album was recorded and mixed over a period of three months at the composer Philip Glass’ Looking Glass Studios in New York. In 2002, Tayler worked alongside producer Andy Ross on what he still considers to be the severely underrated album Open Heart Zoo by the then seventeen-year-old Martin Grech. In 2003, Hine and Tayler recorded and mixed the debut album Poetry and Aeroplanes by singer-songwriter Teitur in Spain and Los Angeles.

The early 2000s saw Tayler and Sadia Sadia teaming up with the renowned glass-maker and experimental filmmaker Anthony Stern, to create the experimental film-poem The Noon Gun, which had its debut at the 53rd Melbourne International Film Festival in 2004. The film had its UK premiere at the National Media Museum (formerly the National Museum of Photography, Film and Television) in Bradford in September 2004, and has featured in film festivals worldwide. This marked the beginning of an ongoing collaboration with Anthony Stern, resulting in a number of critically acclaimed films including those featured in the programme Le Cinema de L’Avant Garde at the Cinémathèque Française in Paris, France in June 2008.

Tayler began to experiment with film and video arts, as well as post production, alongside his emerging work as a composer and sound designer. He developed a talent for creating digitally-generated stage visuals and designing visual iconography for use in live performance. He has contributed audio and visual work to many DVD projects for Howard Jones, and also designed the interactive graphics for the stage display at Howard’s 2010 ‘Human’s Lib/Dream Into Action’ show at indigo at The O2 in London. These visuals have since been used for Howard's US, Japan and UK tours. In November 2013, Tayler once again teamed up with Howard Jones for his 30th Anniversary Concerts, this time creating and directing the visual elements for a new thirty-minute ’set’ piece entitled ‘ENGAGE’. Having directed the filming of the Howard Jones show 'ENGAGE' in 2013, Tayler constructed an edit featuring his visuals and the live footage over the course of 2014. Howard Jones has since released 'ENGAGE' as a DVD and CD, along with a limited edition artist's book which has been launched in conjunction with live shows in London and Los Angeles in February 2015.

In 2012, Tayler recorded and released an album of original compositions under the title Ostinato, alongside producing an accompanying set of moving image works in his unique visual language. It was first released in 2012 as a download, and consequently it was re-issued as a CD in 2015 on Esoteric Recordings/Cherry Red.

2014 saw Tayler produce Carnforth Station by singer-songwriter Jennifer Crook, as well as teaming up with installation artist Sadia Sadia and artist Darren Munce to produce the installation work Fugue (Die Wende), a filmed installation about the removal of light. The work formed part of the City of Leipzig's ‘Lichtfest 2014 Kulturparcours’, a citywide event celebrating the ‘Peaceful Revolution’ demonstrations of October 9, 1989 that are credited with bringing about the collapse of the communist DDR government, and the fall of the Berlin Wall exactly one month later. The work ran across two locations: as part of Sadia's solo show ‘Echoes and Ashes’ at Spinnerei's LIA, as well as at Halle 14 Zentrum für zeitgenössische Kunst (Centre for Contemporary Art). Tayler composed the music as well as creating the four channel sound field.

July 2015 saw the release of the album The Art of Peace - Songs for Tibet II. It was created to celebrate the 80th birthday of the Dalai Lama, and to promote his vision of compassion, non-violence and peace. The album features songs by various artists who donated previously unreleased material or alternative versions of songs to the project. The album was curated by music producer Rupert Hine, and the tracks were coordinated by Tayler, who was responsible for cleaning up, pre-mastering and sequencing the material. Tayler mixed "The Book of My Life (Ostinato Mix)" by Sting, "Mother Within (Ostinato Mix)" by Beyond (feat. Tina Turner, Regula Curti, Dechen Shak-Dagsay & Sawani Shende-Sathaye) and "You Can’t Be Chased (Ostinato Mix)" by Rupert Hine. He also created the ‘Remastered Shimmer’ treatment for Wild Man by Kate Bush. The album also features contributions by Lorde, Of Monsters and Men, The Crystal Method (feat. Meiko), Howard Jones, Bob Geldof, Elbow, The Family Crest, Duncan Sheik, Eleanor McEvoy, Ed Prosek, Rival Sons and Peter Gabriel.

November 2016 saw Tayler return to playing live shows with the ensemble Nooten/Barten/Tayler for performances in Amsterdam. In 2017, Tayler performed his audio-visual solo show 'Ostinato - LIVE' at The Pound Arts Centre in Corsham, Wiltshire.

=== Kate Bush ===
In 2010, Tayler mixed most of the tracks for Kate Bush's first album in six years, Director's Cut, which entered the UK Albums Chart at No. 2 on its release in May 2011. Also in 2011, he was responsible for all of the mixing on 50 Words for Snow, as well as recording contributions from Steve Gadd, Elton John and Stephen Fry. The album comprised seven new tracks, with a running time of over an hour.

In 2012, he mixed "Running Up That Hill (A Deal with God)" 2012 Remix by Kate Bush, which featured in its entirety with a choreographed work in the London 2012 Summer Olympics Closing Ceremony.

In August 2014, Tayler returned to work with Bush on her twenty-two date residency at the Hammersmith Apollo, for the show 'Before The Dawn - KT Fellowship’. The residency marked her return to the stage after an absence of thirty-five years, all 77,000 tickets selling out in fifteen minutes. The shows received rave reviews internationally. "The critics were unanimous in their awe" (The Guardian). Tayler was brought on board to specifically control Bush's vocal sound, processing and effects. He joined the sound team of nine people, and the preparations for the show took many months, featuring a dazzling combination of lighting and sound design, projections, props, puppeteers, and theatrical effects.

"I am so proud to be associated with this project, and very touched that Kate has trusted me to manage and mix her voice. It is an honour and a privilege to be a part of the wonderful sound team, an experience that will remain with me for the rest of my life" says Tayler. In the programme, Tayler is credited as the ‘Kate Vocal Navigator’ and, as Bush writes in the programme notes, "solely in charge of my live vocal sound and song ‘maps'."

KT Fellowship presents Before the Dawn was released as a three CD set and a four vinyl set on 25 November 2016. Tayler mixed the album with Bush, as well as doing the audio post-production on the project. The album entered the UK album charts at number four, as well as topping the vinyl charts at number one.

== Selected discography ==
=== 1970s ===
- Tommy Bolin - Private Eyes album (1976)
- Gong - Gazeuse! album (1976)
- Brand X - Moroccan Roll album (1976)
- Bill Bruford - Feels Good to Me album (1976)
- City Boy - "5.7.0.5." single (1977)
- Claude Francois - Quelquefois - album (1977)
- U.K. - U.K. album (1977)
- Voyage - Voyage album (1977)
- Bill Bruford - One of a Kind album (1978)
- Brand X - Masques album (1978)
- Peter Gabriel - Peter Gabriel 2 (Scratch) album tracks (1978)
- Rod Argent - Moving Home album (1978)
- Stomu Yamashta - Go Too album (1978)
- Voyage - Fly Away album (1978)
- Peter Gabriel - "I Don’t Remember" single B-side (1979)

=== 1980s ===
- Edward Reekers - The Last Forest album (1980)
- Rupert Hine - Immunity album (1981)
- The Planets - "Intensive Care" - single (1981)
- The Fixx - Shuttered Room album (1981)
- Jona Lewie - Heart Skips Beat album (1981)
- Models - Local and/or General album (1981)
- Caravan - The Album album (1981)
- Saga - Worlds Apart album (1981)
- Chris de Burgh - The Getaway album (1982)
- Phil Collins - Live at Perkins Palace - concert video (1982)
- The Waterboys - The Waterboys album tracks (1982)
- Rupert Hine - Waving Not Drowning album (1983)
- Saga - Heads or Tales album (1983)
- The Fixx - Reach the Beach album (1983)
- The Little Heroes (Australian Band) - Watch The World album (1983)
- The Lords of the New Church - The Lords of the New Church album (1983)
- The Waterboys - A Pagan Place album tracks (1984)
- Chris de Burgh - Man on the Line album (1984)
- Honeymoon Suite - Honeymoon Suite album (1984)
- Howard Jones - Human’s Lib album (1984)
- The Lords of the New Church - Is Nothing Sacred? album (1984)
- Tina Turner - Private Dancer album tracks (1984)
- Howard Jones - The 12 Inch Album album (1985)
- Rupert Hine - Wildest Wish to Fly album (1985)
- The Fixx - Phantoms album (1985)
- Bob Geldof - Deep in the Heart of Nowhere album (1986)
- Howard Jones - Dream into Action album (1986)
- Kate Bush, Bob Geldof - The Secret Policeman’s Third Ball video sound mix (1986)
- Martin Ansell - The Englishman Abroad - album (1986)
- The Fixx - Walkabout album (1986)
- Tina Turner - Break Every Rule album tracks (1986)
- Better Off Dead - soundtrack score and album (1987)
- David Wilcox - Breakfast at the Circus album (1987)
- Eight Seconds - Almacantar album (1987)
- Frozen Ghost - Frozen Ghost album (1987)
- Jethro Tull - Crest of a Knave album tracks (1987)
- Thompson Twins - Close to the Bone (1987)
- Thinkman - The Formula album (1987)
- Brian Spence - Reputation album (1987)
- Frozen Ghost - Nice Place to Visit album (1988)
- Honeymoon Suite - The Big Prize album (1988)
- Judie Tzuke - Turning Stones album (1988)
- Rebel Heels - One by One by One album (1988)
- T’Pau - Rage album (1988)
- Underworld - Underneath the Radar album (1988)
- Rush - Presto album (1989)
- Stevie Nicks - The Other Side of the Mirror album (1989)
- Thinkman - Life is a Full Time Occupation album (1989)
- Trooper - The Last of the Gypsies album (1989)

=== 1990s ===
- Bob Geldof - The Vegetarians of Love album (1990)
- Various Artists (Sting, Lou Reed, Dave Stewart, Suzanne Vega etc.) - One World One Voice Album, TV (1990)
- Guesch Patti - Nomades album tracks (1990)
- Judie Tzuke - Left Hand Talking album (1990)
- Nick Kamen - "I Promised Myself" single (1990)
- Thinkman - Hard Hat Zone album (1990)
- Bliss - A Change in the Weather album (1991)
- Frozen Ghost - Shake Your Spirit album (1991)
- Remmy Ongala - Mambo album (1991)
- Rush - Roll the Bones album (1991)
- The Fixx - Ink album tracks (1991)
- Thomas Anders - Whispers album (1991)
- Trooper - Ten album (1991)
- Various Artists - A Week in the Real World - part 1 album tracks (1991)
- Bob Geldof - The Happy Club album (1992)
- Chris de Burgh - Power of Ten album (1992)
- Various Artists - A Week or Two in the Real World album tracks (1992)
- David Wilcox - Collected Works album tracks (1993)
- Katey Sagal - Well... album (1993)
- Milla Jovovich - The Divine Comedy album tracks (1993)
- Spin 1ne 2wo - Spin 1ne 2wo album (1993)
- This Picture - City of Sin album (1993)
- Renato Zero - L’Imperfetto album (1994)
- Ezio - Black Boots on Latin Feet album (1994)
- Les Negresses Vertes - Zig-Zague album (1994)
- MichaelBall - One Careful Owner album tracks (1994)
- Laura Pausini - "Solitudine" (English version) single (1994)
- Rupert Hine - The Deep End album (1994)
- The Fixx - Missing Linxx album tracks (1994)
- Touch! (French band) - Marche Avec Moi album (1994)
- Vylinda - The Kiss album (1994)
- Equa - Equa album (1995)
- Howard Jones - Live Acoustic America album (1995)
- Marian Gold - United album (1995)
- Noa (Achinoam Nini) - Calling album (1995)
- Massimo Di Cataldo - Siamo Nati Liberi album (1995)
- Celtus (band) - Moonchild album (1996)
- Claudio Baglioni - Attori e Spettatore triple album and concert video (1996)
- Duncan Sheik - Duncan Sheik album (1996)
- Justin Hayward - The View from the Hill album (1996)
- United Against Racism - "R.E.S.P.E.C.T." single (1996)
- Massimo Di Cataldo - Anime album (1996)
- Anna Oxa - "Storie" single (1997)
- Éric Serra The Fifth Element - soundtrack tracks (1997)
- Éric Serra R.X.R.A. album (1997)
- Howard Jones - Angels and Lovers album tracks (1997)
- Mario Lavezzi - Voci e Chittara album (1997)
- Massimo Di Cataldo - Crescendo album (1997)
- Paola e Chiara - Ci Chiamano Bambine album (1997)
- The Fixx - Happy Landings and Lost Tracks tracks (1997)
- Phil Palmer Project - Trei Uomini e Una Gamba score, album (1997)
- Anna Oxa - Senza Pieta album (1998)
- Claudio Baglioni - A-Live at Olympic Stadium double album (1998)
- Justin Hayward - Live in San Juan Capistrano concert video and album (1998)
- Khadja Nin - Ya album (1998)
- Rat Bat Blue - Greatest Hits Volume 1 - The Hungry Years album (1998)
- Renato Zero - Amore Doppo Amore album (1998)
- The Moody Blues - Strange Times album tracks (1999)
- Howard Jones and Duncan Sheik - "Someone You Need" single (1999)
- Howard Jones - Pafawm album (1999)
- Claudio Baglioni - Viaggaitore album tracks (1999)
- Renato Zero - Tour Doppo Tour concert video and album (1999)

=== 2000s–present ===
- Howard Jones - Perform 2000 album (2000)
- Nadiya - "J’ai Confiance en Toi" single (2000)
- Equa - Bimboland Soundtrack movie tracks, album tracks (2000)
- Ron - Ron 1970-2000 album (2000)
- Suzanne Vega - Songs in Red and Gray album (2001)
- Renato Zero - La Curva Dell’Angelo album (2001)
- Nadiya - Changer les Choses album (2001)
- Ron - Cuori di Vetro album (2001)
- Martin Grech - Open Heart Zoo album (2002)
- Massimo Di Cataldo - Veramente album (2002)
- Teitur - Poetry and Aeroplanes album (2003)
- Howard Jones - Live Salt Lake City concert DVD (2003)
- Renato Zero - Figli de Sogno Live 2004 concert DVD and album (2004)
- Howard Jones - 20th Anniversary Concert concert DVD (2005)
- Renato Zero - Il Dono album (2005)
- Renato Zero - Zeromovimento concert DVD and album (2006)
- Howard Jones - Revolution:Remixed and surrounded remix DVD (2006)
- Nominjin - untitled album (2007)
- Walk on Water - Pets album (2008)
- The Lost T-shirts of Atlantis - The Day is Yours album (2008)
- Equa - The Noon Gun, Original Soundtrack album (2008)
- Clark Datchler - Tomorrow album (2008)
- Howard Jones - 25th Anniversary Concert concert triple CD (2008)
- Clark Datchler - Fishing for Souls album (2010)
- Mattia de Luca - Dreamers album (2010)
- Kate Bush - Director's Cut album tracks (2011)
- Kate Bush - 50 Words for Snow album (2011)
- The Fixx - Beautiful Friction album (2012)
- Kate Bush - Running Up That Hill (A Deal With God) Remix (2012)
- Stephen W Tayler - Ostinato album (2012)
- Johnny Hates Jazz - Magnetized album (2013)
- Jennifer Crook - Carnforth Station album (2014)
- Various Artists - The Art of Peace - Songs for Tibet II album (2015)
- Rupert Hine - Unshy on the Skyline album compilation remastered (2015)
- Kate Bush - KT Fellowship presents Before The Dawn album (2016)
- Jennifer Crook - The Year, She Turns album (2016)
- Brand X - But Wait... There's More! - LIVE double album (2017)
- Edward Reekers - The Last Forest album remastered (2017)
- Pieter Nooten - STEM album (2018)
- Brand X - Locked & Loaded - LIVE album (2018)
- Brand X - Live at RoSfest 2018 CD and concert Blu-ray (2018)
- Be-Bop Deluxe - Sunburst Finish - 2018 Mix stereo and 5.1 mix (2018)
- Be-Bop Deluxe - Futurama - 2019 Mix stereo and 5.1 mix (2019)
- Thinkman - Fighting Apathy with Shock album compilation remastered (2019)
- Western Electric Sound System - The Incredible Shrinking Man album (2019)
- Be-Bop Deluxe - Modern Music - 2019 Mix stereo and 5.1 mix (2019)
- Be-Bop Deluxe - Axe Victim - 2020 Mix stereo and 5.1 mix (2020)
- Green Needle - Headphone Rock album (2020)
- Howard Jones - Live at Siyan Live Stream and CD (2020)
- Be-Bop Deluxe - Drastic Plastic - 2021 Mix stereo and 5.1 mix (2021)

=== Film, post-production, sound and visual art installations, live events ===
- "Live Salt Lake City" - Howard Jones in concert - sound mixer, co-editor, DVD author (2003)
- "The Noon Gun" - a film by Anthony Stern - composer, sound mixer/designer, co-editor (2003)
- "The Memory of Water part one" - an installation by Sadia Sadia - composer, sound mixer/designer (2004)
- "20th Anniversary Concert" - Howard Jones in concert - camera, sound mixer, co-editor, DVD author (2005)
- "Piano Solos 2" - audio DVD by Howard Jones - DVD author (2006)
- "Revolution:Remixed and Surrounded" - Howard Jones - remixer, visual artist, DVD author (2006)
- "Iggy the Eskimo Girl" - a film by Anthony Stern - sound mixer/designer, co-editor (2008)
- "The End of the Party: Hyde Park ‘69" - a film by Anthony Stern - sound mixer/designer, co-editor (2008)
- "San Francisco redux No. 1" - a film by Anthony Stern/Sadia Sadia/Stephen W Tayler - co-director, co-editor, composition, sound mixer/designer (2008)
- "Baby Baby", "Nothing to do with Me", "Serendipity". "Wheel", "Ted Berrigan", "San Francisco" - films by Anthony Stern - audio restoration, picture restoration (2008)
- "The Scar Crow" - a film by Andy Thompson - sound mixer/designer (2009)
- "Noise: Ghosts of Noise" - an installation by Sadia Sadia - sound mixer/designer (2009)
- "Human’s Lib/Dream Into Action Concert Tour" - Howard Jones - concert visuals for 26 songs (2010-2012)
- "Metamorphoses in ‘A’ Minor" - a film/installation by Sadia Sadia - composer, sound mixer/designer (2011)
- "30th Anniversary Concert" - Howard Jones - created and directed visuals and filmed works for the mixed media piece 'ENGAGE!' and 10 other songs (2013)
- 'All Time and Space Fold into the Infinite Present (Cataract Gorge)' - a film and sound installation by Sadia Sadia - post-production, sound design (2013)
- 'Before The Dawn - KT Fellowship' - 22 theatrical concert performances by Kate Bush - 'Kate Vocal Navigator', live vocal mixer (2014)
- 'Fugue (Die Wende)' - a film and sound installation by Sadia Sadia, Stephen W Tayler and Darren Munce - post-production, sound design and composition (2014)
- 'Engage' - Howard Jones - film incorporating visuals and live event - visuals, director, editor, producer (2015)
- 'Engage' - Howard Jones - live multimedia event - visuals (2015)
- 'DAS Hinterland' - Nooten/Barten/Tayler - (live performance) (2016)
- 'Ostinato - LIVE' - Stephen W Tayler - (live performance) (2017)
- 'Live at RoSfest 2018'- Brand X - surround audio mixing, video editing and post-production for concert Blu-ray (2018)
- 'Transform' - Howard Jones - live multimedia event - visuals (2019)
- 'Da Capo - LIVE' - Stephen W Tayler - (live performance at Real World Studios) (2019)
