= Sonder (Tesseract album) =

Studio album by Tesseract
- Released: 20 April 2018
- Recorded: 2017
- Studios: 4D Sounds (Milton Keynes, UK); Celestial Sound Chicago, Illinois)
- Genres: Progressive metal; djent
- Length: 36:24
- Label: Kscope
- Producers: Acle Kahney; Aidan O'Brien; Tesseract

Tesseract chronology
Polaris (2016)	Sonder (2018)	War of Being (2023)

Singles from Sonder
- 1. "Smile" Released: 23 June 2017; 2. "Luminary" Released: 8 February 2018; 3. "King" Released: 16 March 2018

Professional ratings
Aggregate scores
Source	Rating
Metacritic	70/100
Review scores
Source	Rating
AllMusic	3.5/5 stars
Metal Injection	8.5/10 stars
Metal Storm	8.0/10
Exclaim!	8/10

Sonder is the fourth studio album by British progressive metal band Tesseract. It was released on 20 April 2018 through Kscope, following Polaris (2015).

Tesseract began recording the album in 2017, releasing its first single, "Smile", on 23 June, with the intention of reworking it for Sonder. The album's lead single, "Luminary", was released on 8 February 2018, the same day the album was announced. It is notably the band's first full-length release to not feature a lineup change from the previous album.

== Background ==
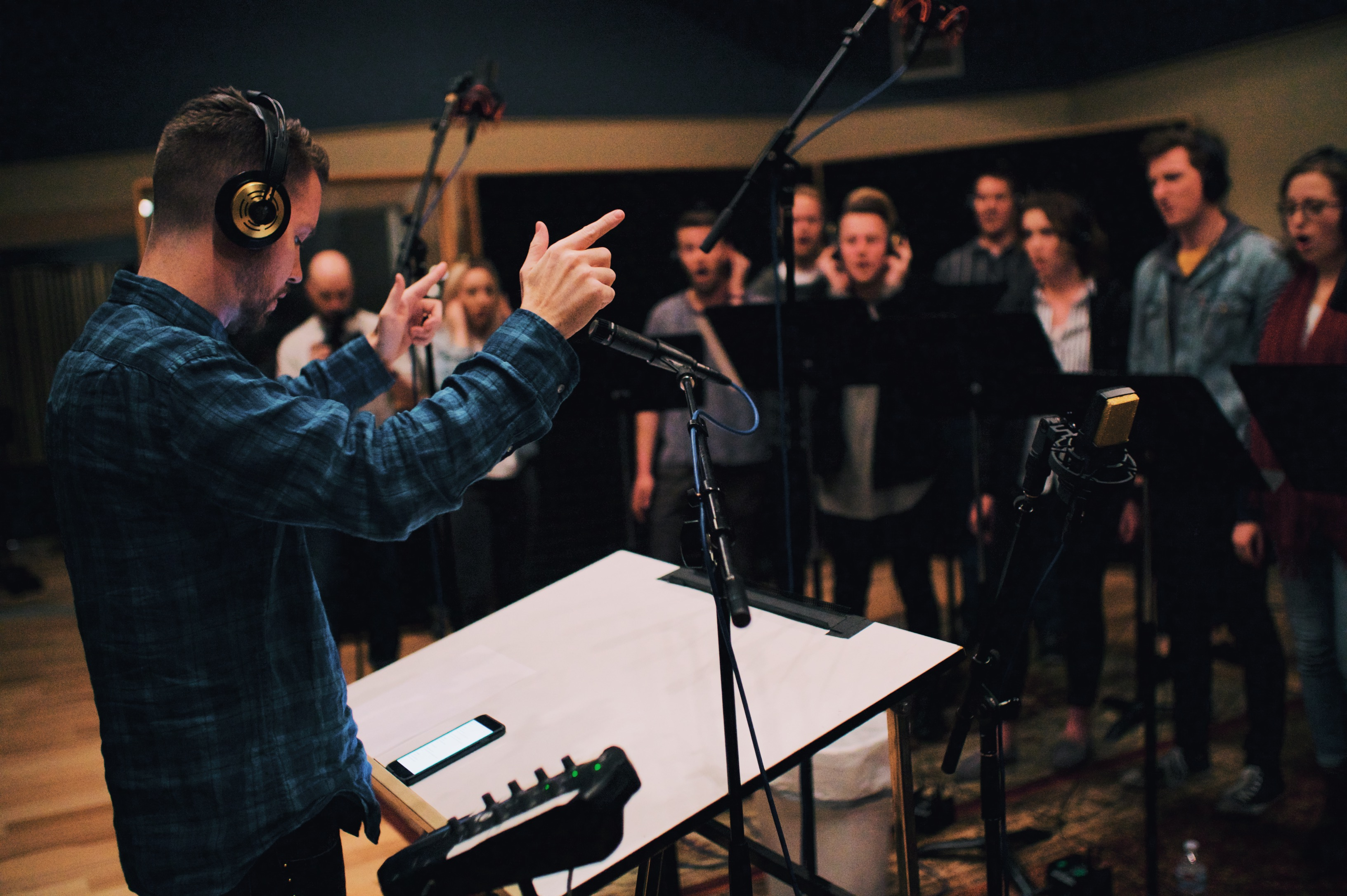
Sonder features a live choir produced and conducted by Randy Slaugh.

Sonder marks Tesseract's second consecutive release and third overall with the original vocalist, Daniel Tompkins, who first appeared on their debut studio album, One (2011), and later, Polaris. A concept album, Sonder was described by Tompkins as "exploring a deep and devouring sense of insignificance". "Smile" was released by the band on 23 June 2017, and was described as their "most collaborative track in recent times", but was intended to be reworked and extended for the album.

The album was originally announced on 8 February 2018, with the simultaneous release of its lead single, "Luminary", and the music video for "King" (directed by Kyle Kadow and Steven Cleavland in Wisconsin) being released on 16 March. For the first time, the band acquired the talents of a choir, produced and conducted by Randy Slaugh of White Moth Black Butterfly and recorded at Soularium Studios in the U.S. Sonder is the band's shortest studio album at 36 minutes in length.

The inspiration for the album's name came from a fictional word used in The Dictionary of Obscure Sorrows.

== Track listing ==
No.	Title	Length
1.	"Luminary"	3:12
2.	"King"	6:56
3.	"Orbital"	2:19
4.	"Juno"	5:12
5.	"Beneath My Skin"	5:34
6.	"Mirror Image"	5:47
7.	"Smile"	4:47
8.	"The Arrow"	2:37
Total length:		36:24

== Personnel ==
Tesseract

- Daniel Tompkins – lead vocals
- Acle Kahney – lead guitar, production, recording, mixing, mastering
- James 'Metal' Monteith – rhythm guitar
- Amos Williams – bass, growls, backing vocals, cover art
- Jay Postones – drums, percussion

Additional personnel

- Tesseract – production
- Aidan O'Brien – production, engineering
- Randy Slaugh – choir production, conducting

== Charts ==
Chart performance for Sonder
Chart (2018)	Peak position
Australian Albums (ARIA)	47
Austrian Albums (Ö3 Austria)	31
Belgian Albums (Ultratop Flanders)	174
Belgian Albums (Ultratop Wallonia)	112
German Albums (Offizielle Top 100)	48
Scottish Albums (Official Charts)	35
Swiss Albums (Schweizer Hitparade)	51
UK Albums (Official Charts)	62
US Billboard 200	198
