= Bad Reputation (David Wilcox album) =

Studio album by David Wilcox
- Released: September 1984
- Recorded: 1984
- Genre: Blues rock
- Length: 32:41
- Label: Capitol
- Producer: Sadia Sadia

David Wilcox chronology
My Eyes Keep Me in Trouble (1983)	Bad Reputation (1984)	Breakfast at the Circus (1987)

Bad Reputation is the third album by the Canadian guitarist David Wilcox. The album includes eleven songs.

== Track listing ==
1. "Bad Reputation" – 2:44
2. "Ting Ting" – 3:40
3. "Somethin's Shakin'" – 3:42
4. "Boogie Ride" – 2:35
5. "Cactus" – 3:08
6. "Can't Take It Anymore" – 2:18
7. "The Grind" – 3:18
8. "Love Me Too" – 2:50
9. "Preachin' The Blues" – 3:02
10. "Brain Fever" – 2:56
11. "Play On Your Harp" – 2:12

== Personnel ==
- David Wilcox - vocals, mandolin, kazoo, guitars
- Dave Flett - guitar
- Stan Szelest - keyboards
- Kit Johnson - bass
- Rob Burns - bass
- Whitey Glan - drums, percussion
- David Rose - backing vocals

Technical

- Matthew Wiley - photography
