= The Dictionary of Obscure Sorrows =

English word-construction project by John Koenig

The Dictionary of Obscure Sorrows is an English word-construction project by John Koenig, seeking to coin and define neologisms for emotions not yet described in language. The project was launched as a website and YouTube channel, but was later compiled into a printed dictionary in 2021. The entries include extensive constructed etymologies based on Koenig's own research on linguistics, with roots and suffixes taken from Latin, Germanic, and Ancient Greek sources in emulation of existing English terms. The website includes verbal entries in the style of a conventional dictionary, and the YouTube channel picks some of those words and tries to express their meaning more thoroughly in the form of video essays. The book takes from those previous formats, so it has both dictionary style entries and some longer essays on specific words.

Koenig's terms are often based on what was described as "feelings of existentialism" and are meant to "fill a hole in the language", often from reader contributions of specific emotions. Some videos incorporate large numbers of photographs. For example, the video for Vemödalen (See Notable Words section) combines 465 similar images taken by different photographers into a continuous sequence. Other videos are more personal, such as Avenoir, which involves a "collage of his own home movies to piece together an exploration of life's linearity."

The official book for the Dictionary of Obscure Sorrows was released by Simon & Schuster on November 16, 2021.

== History ==
The dictionary was first considered in 2006 when Koenig was studying at Macalester College, Minnesota and attempting to write poetry. The Dictionary of Obscure Sorrows was the idea he came up with that would contain all the words he needed for his poetry, including emotions that had never been linguistically described. The popularity of the website and web series began to grow in June 2015 after a list of 23 words from the dictionary began to be shared on multiple social media sites.

== Notable words ==
vemödalen n. the frustration of photographing something amazing when thousands of identical photos already exist—the same sunset, the same waterfall, the same curve of a hip, the same closeup of an eye—which can turn a unique subject into something hollow and pulpy and cheap, like a mass-produced piece of furniture you happen to have assembled yourself.

— John Koenig, The Dictionary of Obscure Sorrows

Several of the neologisms presented in The Dictionary of Obscure Sorrows, especially those that have an accompanying video, have received attention and interest. The term vemödalen focuses on the lack of creativity within photography due to the existence of similar photographs having been taken in the past. However, the video also focuses on how it is "inevitable that the 'same' image will be captured by different individuals" while it is also correct that "just because some things seem similar, their uniqueness is not annulled". Using a quotation from Walt Whitman, the video points out that something being unique will always be based on adding to what came before and that every photo ever made is being added to the story of photographs that all people are collaborating on.

The term sonder has been noted as well for its relation to other people, its definition being "the realization that each random passerby is living a life as vivid and complex as your own". Sonder has also been appropriated by various companies for use such as the name of a bike brand and a mental therapy marketplace, Sondermind, as well as the title of a video game. The third album from indie pop artist Kaoru Ishibashi was named Sonderlust after this term from the dictionary and references the separation from his wife and his attempts to understand her life. Sonder is the fourth studio album by English progressive metal band TesseracT. Sonder is the second studio album by American pop-rock band The Wrecks. Sonder is the name of an American neo-soul group consisting of singer Brent Faiyaz and producers Atu and Dpat.

Multiple words from the dictionary, such as ellipsism, énouement, and onism, were used as titles for various cocktails served at the Chicago restaurant Knife. Similarly, an art gallery exhibit for the works of Michael Sagato in Los Angeles uses words from the Dictionary of Obscure Sorrows to title each of his art pieces and to reference the meaning behind each piece.

== Critical reception ==
The Times of India referred to the dictionary as a "delightful website for etymologists and wordsmiths". Sharanya Manivannan, writing for The New Indian Express, described the dictionary as a "beautiful experiment on the fine line between babble and Babel." Eley Williams, writing for The Guardian on the topic of fictional dictionaries, described Koenig's project as "by turns stirring and playful, providing lexical and linguistic plugs for the lacunae of everyday expression".

== See also ==
- wikt:Category:English terms coined by John Koenig
- Dialectology
- Language construction
  - A posteriori languages
- The Anatomy of Melancholy
