= Voices from the Fuselage =

English progressive metal band

- Origin: Northampton, England
- Genres: Progressive metal; djent
- Years active: 2010–present
- Labels: Century Media; White Star
- Members: Ashe O'Hara; Mitch Ramsay; Josh Galloway; Scott Lockhart
- Website: facebook.com/VoicesFromTheFuselage/

Voices from the Fuselage are an English progressive metal band from Northampton, currently signed to White Star Records. The band formed in 2010, when they attended Northampton College together, studying Music Practice. They have released two albums; Odyssey: The Destroyer of Worlds (2015) and their latest, Odyssey: The Founder of Dreams, was released in 2018, as well as an EP entitled Hope in 2011. They were signed by John Mitchell of Arena and John Wetton's band.

In between their EP and first album, Ashe O'Hara was also singing for the progressive band Tesseract as part of their pivotal album Altered State.

== History ==
=== Early years (2010–2012) ===
Voices from the Fuselage started in 2010 whilst studying Music Practice at Northampton College. The original line-up performed Karnivool and Anberlin covers as part of their Music Practice course. In the second year of college (2011), drummer Scott Lockhart joined the band. Voices from the Fuselage started writing original material in 2011 and went on to release their first single 'Out Of Hand' on SoundCloud, which was written during a class in college. The band continued writing original music in-between classes, eventually releasing 'Everything Begins With Choice'. These first two songs were well received by fellow college musicians and the wider music scene in Northampton, which inspired the band to start writing their debut EP 'To Hope'.

'To Hope' was originally written as a short-length concept EP with repeating themes and motifs throughout. The EP was demoed in the summer of 2011 at drummer Scott Lockhart's house and eventually recorded by 'Timfy James' at Core Studios in Milton Keynes in October 2011. The EP was much heavier than the previous releases and quickly gained the attention of the 'djent' scene online.

After the release of the EP, the band went on to play shows around the UK supporting band such as Textures, The Safety Fire and Hacktivist.

=== Odyssey: The Destroyer of Worlds (2012–2015) ===
In 2012, vocalist Ashe O'hara joined Tesseract leaving Voices from the Fuselage unable to tour. The band used this time to write their debut album Odyssey: The Destroyer of Worlds. In late 2014, Voices from the Fuselage contacted John Mitchell of Outhouse Studios and began the process of recording their debut album. The album was completed in May 2015.

During the recording process, John Mitchell was so impressed by their musicianship and their professionalism that he contributed a guest guitar slot to a track on the album. This led to the band signing to John's new record label 'White Star Records', started by Chis Hillman and himself.
