= Rob Burns =

English-New Zealand musician (born 1953)

- Burns recording in London, 1971

Background information
- Born: Robert George Henry Burns; 24 February 1953 (age 73); Willesden, London, England
- Genres: Pop, rock, jazz, country, R&B
- Occupations: Musician, arranger, author, lecturer
- Instrument: Bass guitar
- Years active: 1972–present

Rob Burns (born Robert George Henry Burns, 24 February 1953), earlier also known as Robbie Burns, is an English-born New Zealand bass player, author and academic. Burns's career spans five decades, encompassing musical genres such as pop, rock, R&B, soul, jazz, gospel, folk, and country. From the late 1970s until 1999 he toured and worked several sessions a week for artists of international fame, as well as for many major British TV shows, before embarking upon an academic career.

Burns earned a PhD in music in 2008 and has published work in several academic publications. He resides in Dunedin, New Zealand, gaining citizenship of New Zealand on 4 June 2014. Burns is currently Honorary Associate Professor in the Music Programme (School of Performing Arts) at the University of Otago.

== Early life ==
The only child of George and Doris Burns, Robert Burns was born in Willesden, London. When he was four years old, the family moved to the new town of Hemel Hempstead, some 27 miles (43 km) north-west of central London, where he attended Blessed Cuthbert Mayne School, St. Albert the Great and Hemel Hempstead Grammar School (now Hemel Hempstead School).

In 1969 at age 16, Burns co-founded the band Lifeblud whose live performances included as support act for Wizz Jones, Uriah Heep, Heads Hands & Feet, Caravan (at the Marquee Club), Egg and Stray. They recorded three albums as acetates.

== Career ==
=== Touring ===
Burns began his career as a professional musician in Britain in September 1972, performing as a touring bass guitarist for visiting major American soul artists Sam and Dave, Isaac Hayes, The Stylistics and Edwin Starr. In 1973, Burns co-founded the band Gateway Driver with guitarist/songwriter Martin Springett and drummer Jim McGillivray (later of German band Epitaph), with whom he toured extensively, notably as support act for Soft Machine. Late in 1979, Burns became the original bassist with Cayenne, a jazz-rock and Afro-Cuban band formed by guitarist Robert Greenfield with musicians from the R&B and funk band Gonzalez.

Live performances and touring continued with jazz trumpeter Ian Carr (author of biographies of Miles Davis and Keith Jarrett) as a member of Carr's band, Nucleus, with Burns appearing on seven tracks on their Live at the BBC CD box-set, and an appearance in 1981 with Morrissey-Mullen. Burns also worked with Christian singer Garth Hewitt and performed on two world tours as musical director for Eric Burdon of The Animals between 1982 and 1987, appearing on his 1985 That's Live album. Between 1989 and 1996, he played the bass in the Dolphins with Robin Lumley of Brand X, Willie Wilson of Sutherland Brothers and Quiver, and Pink Floyd guitarist and vocalist David Gilmour, within whose ranks Clem Clempson and Mick Ralphs would come to jam in the band's fluid line-up. Vocally the band incorporated Phil May from the Pretty Things. The Dolphins evolved into the Barracudas, retaining Burns and Clempson and adding Ronnie Leahy on keyboards, Barry Venn on vocals and Clempson's son Joel on drums. For concerts and other events, occasional additional members were guitarists Snowy White and Neil Hubbard, singer Chris Farlowe and saxophonist Dick Heckstall-Smith. Burns also performed live with James Burton, Frank Gambale and Albert Lee during this period.

=== Recording ===
Burns became a studio bass guitarist in the 1980s and recorded for Jon Lord and Ian Paice of Deep Purple for their Paice, Ashton and Lord project, Donna Summer, Atomic Rooster, Zoot Money's Big Roll Band and Vivian Stanshall of The Bonzo Dog Band (including the track "(There's) No Room To Rhumba In A Sports' Car" on the NME 1990 compilation album in aid of the Nordoff-Robbins Music Therapy charity). In 1980, Burns played on "Come Back Marianne" (Magic Moon records) by John Gregg along with Paul Carrack and Zoot Money on keyboards, Les Davidson on guitar and Jeff Allen on drums. In 1981, Burns played on two singles on Chrysalis Records, "Love's Made a Fool of You" and "Boys In Love", as a member of Brian Copsey And The Commotions. He appeared on Jerry Donahue's solo album Neck of the Wood, David Wilcox's Bad Reputation and Arthur Louis' Back From Palookaville. Burns also arranged songs for Chris Martin in his pre-Coldplay era of the mid-1990s.

In 2001, Burns joined ex-David Bowie musician Robin Lumley in the formation of a band called SETI, including drummer Graeme Edge of the Moody Blues and Rod McGrath (former cellist in the WASO and LSO), being an attempt to integrate of the styles of Classical cello and a Rock band. Despite a prolonged period of inactivity, due in part to Burns's move to New Zealand, the SETI project is described as "ongoing". In 2011, Burns traveled to Toronto to play on Canadian artist/musician Martin Springett's album, Diving Into Small Pools.

During 2019–20, the tracks Waxing of the Moon, Bridge and So Be It, recorded during 1970–71 by Lifeblud, for whom Burns played bass, appeared respectively on three CD box set compilations: Strangers In The Room: A Journey Through The British Folk Rock Scene 1967-73, New Moon’s In The Sky: The British Progressive Pop Sounds Of 1970, and Peephole In My Brain – The British Progressive Pop Sounds Of 1971, all on Cherry Red Records' imprint Grapefruit Records. In 2020-21 Seelie Court Records issued the complete Lifeblud 1970 acetate on vinyl and CD as Esse Quam Videri, from tapes recorded at Gooseberry Sound Studios as Be Thou My Very Armour and, from an archive cassette, Live At Bowes Lyon House 1971. A new Lifeblud album, Find Your Wings, combining unreleased archive recordings and recent sessions with Burns and guest musicians, was released in 2025 on Saturn Eye Records.

=== Film and television ===
Burns has played on several major television and film soundtracks including Not the Nine O'Clock News, Three of a Kind, The Lenny Henry Show, Alas Smith and Jones, Red Dwarf, Blackadder, Mr. Bean, A Perfect Spy, 2.4 Children and French & Saunders. During this time, Burns became a mainstay of composer Howard Goodall's "TV" Band. During episode 3 of series 4 of Not The Nine O'Clock News TV program in 1982, Burns appears on-screen playing bass, made up as an elderly Victorian train worker in a sketch about the Roland Davies train strike protest.

In 1987, he formed Robert Burns Music and composed film and advertising music for MTV, DeBeers Diamonds, The Sunday Times, Coca-Cola, McDonald's, IBM, P&O Cruises, and British Aerospace.

=== Theatre ===
In 1979, Burns was invited to perform in the West End production of the rock opera Tommy, by its composer Pete Townshend of the Who, and in 1984 joined the Abbacadabra musical, working with Elaine Paige for Björn Ulvaeus and Benny Andersson of ABBA and Sir Tim Rice.

Following on from his work on British TV comedy shows, Burns played bass in subsequent theatre productions, namely the "Rowan Atkinson in Revue" tour (1981), which won an Olivier Award, and "Not in Front of the Audience" with the Not the Nine O'Clock News cast in London (1982). Around this time, Burns played, along with drummer Jeff Allen, in support of comedian Spike Milligan, Lynsey de Paul, and Gerard Kenny at a charity event at the Commonwealth Institute in London.

=== Academia ===
From 1992, Burns was departmental head at the Guitar Institute in Acton (assisted by Dave Kilminster, Shaun Baxter, Terry Gregory and Iain Scott), BassTech, and Drumtech, the contemporary music departments of the London College of Music. He led the design team that developed a one-year foundation programme in popular music followed by the first popular music performance degree, validated by Thames Valley University (now University of West London) in 1999.

Burns taught as a visiting lecturer at Brunel University, Leeds College of Music, Guildhall School of Music and Drama and The Royal Academy of Music. He was principal examiner for grade exams in bass guitar for Rockschool/Trinity College of Music from 1992 to 1998. He gained a B.A.(Hons) at Brunel (1996) and became a Fellow of the London College of Music in 1997 and a Fellow of the Higher Education Academy in 2006. He is a member of the International Association for the Study of Popular Music.

From 2001 until 2018, Burns lectured in music at the University of Otago where he earned his PhD and attained the position of associate professor in music, specialising in popular music performance, arranging, composition, music industry studies and cultural studies. His interests included progressive rock music, jazz, research into the globalisation of traditional English folk music, and jazz fusion bass guitar performance. Burns has authored numerous publications in these subjects.

Burns's authored works include:

- "The Beginnings of Live Performance at Guitar Institute, Drumtech, and Basstech" in Popular Music Education in the United Kingdom: Origins, Innovations, Legacies, Intellect Books/University of Chicago Press, 2026
- "The Rock Degree (and my part in it)" in Ka mua, ka muni: 100 years of music at the University of Otago, University of Otago Press, 2026.
- "Indigeneity Meets Improvisation as Free Jazz: A Musical Director's/Editor's Perspective" Chapter in The Routledge Companion to Diasporic Jazz Studies edited by Ádám Havas, Bruce Johnson and David Horn ISBN 978-1-0320-8038-3 (2025, Routledge),
- "Rama and the Worm: A Performance–Based Approach to Applied Ethnomusicology" in Dialogues in Applied Ethnomusicology: Practices, Policies and Challenges, Burns, Robert. G. H., Bendrups, D., Johnson, H. (2021, Beijing: Central Conservatory of Music Press)
- "Experiencing Progressive Rock – A Listener’s Companion" ISBN 978-1-4422-6602-5 (June 2018, Rowman & Littlefield),
- "Transforming folk: Innovation and tradition in English folk-rock music" ISBN 978-0-7190-8533-8 (2011, Manchester University Press),
- "British Folk Songs of the Great War - Then and Now" in The Journal of Military History (Centennial Edition), Volume 79, No. 4 - October 2015, pp. 1059-77 (2015, Society for Military History),
- "Liebe ist für alle da: A Visual Analysis of Rammstein’s 2009 Album Artwork" Chapter in Rammstein on Fire: New Perspectives on the Music and Performances edited by John T. Littlejohn and Michael T. Putnam ISBN 978-0-7864-7463-9 (2013, McFarland),
- "Depicting The Merrie: Historical Imagery in English Folk–Rock" in Music and Art: The International Journal of Music Iconography, Volume 35, Spring–Fall 2010,
- "German symbolism in rock music: national signification in the imagery and songs of Rammstein" (2008, Popular Music, Cambridge University Press),
- "Continuity, Variation, and Authenticity in the English Folk-rock Movement" (2007, Folk Music Journal 9.2 pp.192-218),
- "British Folk Songs in Popular Music Settings" in Folksong: Tradition, Revival and Re-creation ed. Ian Russell and David Atkinson, (2004, English Folk Dance and Song Society and the University of Aberdeen).

Burns was nominated for a Teaching Excellence Award in the 2018 OUSA Teaching Awards, via feedback from the students of the University of Otago.

Burns' recollections were extensively quoted in the 2024 Zoot Money biography "It Should Have Been Me" by Bruce Cherry (AMZ Marketing Hub, ISBN 978-1917124607).

== Influence ==
Some of Burns's former students play for bands and artists such as Basement Jaxx, KT Tunstall, Chaka Khan, Moby and Radiohead.

== Other recent activities ==
Burns has recently performed and recorded with jazz fusion sextet, Subject2change NZ, The Verlaines, country songwriter John Egenes, and the Oxo Cubans.

== Instruments and endorsements ==
Burns plays 4, 5, and 6-string bass, and has long been a proponent of Wal basses. He first began holding Musicians' Union clinics during his session career (replacing Colin Hodgkinson) to showcase the Wal basses (originated by electronics specialist Ian Waller and luthier Pete Stevens) and Trace Elliot amplification, leading to a long-standing relationship with Mark Gooday and Ashdown Amplification. Burns also included Dave Kilminster as a featured guitarist in these clinics.

Burns has been endorsed by Picato Musicians' Strings, Electric Wood Basses (Wal) and J Retro preamps.
