= Unholy (Martin Grech album) =

Studio album by Martin Grech
- Released: 13 June 2005 (UK)
- Recorded: 2005
- Genre: Experimental rock Industrial rock Progressive metal Dark ambient
- Length: 59:08
- Label: Island (UK)
- Producer: Andy Ross

Martin Grech chronology
Open Heart Zoo (2001)	Unholy (2005)	March Of The Lonely (2007)

Professional ratings
Review scores
Source	Rating
The Fly	5/5 stars
Rock Sound	(9/10)
Virgin Media	5/5 stars
Drowned in Sound	4/5 stars

Unholy is a 2005 album by British musician Martin Grech.

== Track listing ==
1. "Guiltless" – 7:42
2. "Venus" – 5:47
3. "Erosion And Regeneration" – 5:07
4. "I Am Chromosome" – 5:00
5. "An End" – 3:09
6. "Holy Father Inferior" – 9:25
7. "Worldly Divine" – 4:54
8. "Lint" – 3:29
9. "Elixir" – 15:35*
- The duration of "Elixir" is 6:14 - there is then a 5-minute silence before the bonus track - "Sun"
