= Perspective (EP) =

EP by Tesseract
- Released: 21 May 2012
- Recorded: Metropolis Studios, UK and 4D Sounds
- Genre: Progressive rock; ambient; acoustic
- Length: 22:57
- Label: Century Media
- Producer: Acle Kahney; Amos Williams

Tesseract chronology
One (2011)	Perspective (2012)	Altered State (2013)

Professional ratings
Review scores
Source	Rating
Metal Injection	Positive

Perspective is the second EP by British progressive metal band Tesseract, released on 21 May 2012. The EP is not a metal record, instead it consists of new renditions of four songs from One: a newly edited version of "Eden" called "Eden 2.0" and acoustic versions of the songs "Perfection", "April", and "Origin". It also includes a cover of Jeff Buckley's "Dream Brother". It is the band's first and only release with vocalist Elliot Coleman, who left the band in June 2012, mere weeks after the release of Perspective.

The cover is similar to that of the band's album One, but whereas the tesseract on the cover of that album is grey, the featured tesseract on Perspective is blue and with an ethereal background.

The EP has a special edition on iTunes where there is an instrumental version of each song.

== Track listing ==
All tracks are written by Tesseract, except Dream Brother by Jeff Buckley, Mick Grøndahl and Matt Johnson.

No.	Title	Length
1.	"Concealing Fate Part Four – Perfection" (acoustic)	3:46
2.	"April" (acoustic)	4:31
3.	"Concealing Fate Part Six – Origin" (acoustic)	4:55
4.	"Dream Brother" (Jeff Buckley cover)	5:17
5.	"Eden 2.0"	4:28
Total length:		22:57

== Personnel ==
Tesseract

- Elliot Coleman – lead vocals
- Acle Kahney – lead guitar, production
- James 'Metal' Monteith – rhythm guitar
- Amos Williams – bass, growls, backing vocals, production
- Jay Postones – drums, percussion
