= Concealing Fate =

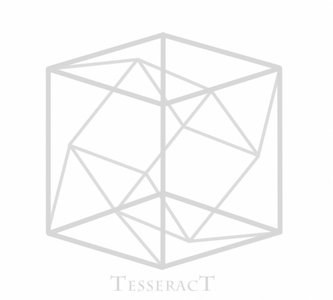

EP by Tesseract
- Released: 11 October 2010
- Recorded: Metropolis Studios, UK and 4D Sounds
- Genre: Progressive metal; djent
- Length: 27:36
- Label: Century Media
- Producer: Acle Kahney

Tesseract chronology
Tesseract (2007)	Concealing Fate (2010)	One (2011)

Concealing Fate is the debut EP by British progressive metal band Tesseract, released on 11 October 2010. "This is a concept album based on life and its obstacles," said vocalist Daniel Tompkins which was featured on a bonus DVD along with their first studio album One (2011). Concealing Fate is a 27 and a half minute track split into 6 parts: "Acceptance", "Deception", "The Impossible", "Perfection", "Epiphany" and "Origin". A live studio playthrough of the EP was also included as a bonus DVD along with One, and a video for "Deception" (Concealing Fate Part 2) was released in 2010.

Professional ratings
Review scores
Source	Rating
AllMusic	3/5 stars

== Track listing ==
All tracks are written by Tesseract

No.	Title	Length
1.	"Concealing Fate: 1. "Acceptance" (8:33); 2. "Deception" (5:22); 3. "The Impossible" (4:50); 4. "Perfection" (2:38); 5. "Epiphany" (1:29); 6. "Origin" (4:44); "	27:36
Total length:		27:36

== Personnel ==
Tesseract

- Daniel Tompkins – lead vocals
- Acle Kahney – lead guitar, production
- James Monteith – rhythm guitar
- Amos Williams – bass, growls, backing vocals
- Jay Postones – drums, percussion
