= Martin Grech =

English musician

Background information
- Born: 14 November 1982 (age 43)
- Origin: Aylesbury, Buckinghamshire, England
- Genres: Experimental rock Progressive metal Industrial rock Alternative rock Dark ambient
- Occupations: Musician, vocalist
- Instruments: Vocals, guitar, piano, drums
- Years active: 2002 – present
- Label: Island Records

Martin Grech (born 14 November 1982) is an English singer, songwriter and musician from Aylesbury, Buckinghamshire.

== Career ==
Grech released his debut album Open Heart Zoo, produced by Andy Ross, in June 2002. He achieved critical acclaim for his falsetto title track, "Open Heart Zoo" (written when he was 15 years old), which was featured on a Lexus advert on British television. This was followed by a well-received UK tour.

In 2005, Grech released a second album, Unholy. As before, reviews were positive. The Unholy art work created by Stephen Kasner was hung as a backdrop to his concerts.

Grech split with Island Records shortly after the release of Unholy, but Grech's Myspace page announced the arrival of the new album, March of the Lonely. The first single from the album, "The Heritage", was released as a CD single on 30 March 2007 on Grech's own record label, 'Martin Grech Songs' via the online label, Burning Shed. March of the Lonely took a completely different approach from his previous CDs, and was much more acoustic, more guitar-based, with a thinner texture and softer atmosphere. The March of the Lonely was released on 4 June 2007 in the UK via Genepool Records.

After moving to California, Grech began working on new material under the name 'Meatsuit'. Demos on MySpace revealed a development of a heavier gothic sound, but in December 2008 Grech announced that his Meatsuit project had been terminated.

In April 2011, Grech released a collection of demos under the title 'Meta'. Also on his BandCamp page, Grech announced his fourth album would be titled "The Watcher".

From February to May 2015 Grech was working in the studio on his 4th album with producer Peter Miles (record producer). Martin collaborated with TesseracT guitarist Acle Kahney and drummer Jay Postones on the album. While working on the album, he also provided backing vocal on the track "Hexes" on their album Polaris. On 15 November 2015 a new track called "Mothflower" was premiered on Daniel P. Carter's Radio 1 Rock Show.

Grech started a Patreon page in March 2020 as a way of setting a creative target every month. He released his first new album since 2007, Hush Mortal Core, via the Patreon platform. The album was released in WAV and MP3 formats with an eBook containing lyrics. Hush Mortal Core was released to streaming services on 17 April 2020. He was shopping for label support with the album, but due to the COVID-19 pandemic, he was unsure for the following year that it would be possible, stating that the pandemic devastated any chances of it happening and that another year of waiting would be too long.

== Other work ==
In 2003 Grech was invited to play at the Jeff Buckley tribute concert by Buckley's mother Mary Guibert, at the Garage, Highbury alongside Ed Harcourt and Jamie Cullum. In 2005, Adam White sampled "Open Heart Zoo" for his trance track "Ballerina".

As well as his solo releases, Grech has performed vocals on the album "First Chance I Get I'm Out of Here" (2005) by fellow Aylesbury musician, Zealey (John Zealey); tracks are "Progress Has Stopped" and "First Chance I Get I'm Out Of Here". He drummed for the four-piece rock band Ophelia Torah between early 2006 and April 2007.

Grech has also been involved in a collaboration project, organised by yourcodenameis:milo, called "Print Is Dead". Along with Bloc Party, Graham Coxon, Tom Vek, Reuben and Biffy Clyro, he worked with yourcodenameis:milo, in their recording studio, to write a song in one day. The track was called "We Hope You Are What You Think You Are".

On 18 September 2015, Grech was featured on the song "Hexes" by the British progressive metal band TesseracT on their third album Polaris.

On 24 July 2015, Grech was featured on the debut self-titled GUNSHIP album on the song "Black Sun On The Horizon".

From 2015 to 2017, Grech was a guitarist for the project Lionface, appeared on EP "Battle". EP also includes a remix made by Martin - "Revamp (Martin Grech Remix)".

On 5 April 2019, Grech was featured on the debut Guy Sigsworth album STET on the song "Aeolian".

In 2008, Grech created the film score to the Adam Mason film, Blood River (2009). He also wrote scores for Luster (2010) and Junkie (2012) movies. Martin Grech's song "The Heritage" was used in Adam Mason's movie The Devil's Chair.

== Touring personnel ==
Musicians known to have toured with Martin include:

- Alistair Hamer – Drums (Open Heart Zoo era) (Sweet Billy Pilgrim)
- Anthony Bishop – Bass (Open Heart Zoo era) (Sweet Billy Pilgrim)
- Pete Miles – Guitars & Keys (Open Heart Zoo & Unholy era)
- Keith Lambert – Bass Guitar (Unholy era) (Vex Red)
- Robin Guy – Drums (Unholy era) (Rachel Stamp, Bruce Dickinson, Sack Trick, Faith No More)
- Tim Elsenburg – Guitars (Open Heart Zoo & Unholy era) (Sweet Billy Pilgrim)

== Discography ==
=== Albums ===
- Open Heart Zoo (2002) – UK No. 54
- Unholy (2005)
- March of the lonely (2007)
- Hush Mortal Core (2020)
- Dragon's Blood (2025)

=== Compilations ===
- Meta (2010)
- Meta: Volume 2 (2011)
- B-Sides, Demos, Live, Rare (2011)

=== EPs and singles ===
- Dali (2002)

1 – Dali (5:40)
2 – Catch Up (3:47)

- Open Heart Zoo (Promo) (2002)

1 – Open Heart Zoo (Circus) (Radio Edit) (4:41)
2 – Open Heart Zoo (Album Version) (5:23)

- Open Heart Zoo (2002)

1 – Open Heart Zoo (Album Version) (5:21)
2 – Storm (5:09)

- Push (Promo) (2002)

1 – Push (Radio Edit) (3:56)

- Push (2003) No. 81 UK

1 – Push (5:01)
2 – Bliss (1:38)
3 – Head Sty (5:25)

- I am Chromosome (Promo) (2004)

1 – I Am Chromosome

- Rest In Peace EP (2004)

1 – Mighty Hands (4:15)
2 – Gratefully Punished (4:26)
3 – Father And Mother Figure (2:48)
4 – Freedom, Warmth And Security (2:53)

- Guiltless (Promo) (2005)

1 – Guiltless (Album Version) (7:47)
2 – Guiltless (Radio Edit) (4:00)

- Guiltless (2005)

1 – Guiltless (7:41)
2 – Seed Of A Seed (3:29)
3 – Worthy (2:59)

- The Heritage (2007)

1 – The Heritage (3:32)
2 – Ashes Over Embers (5:39)
