= War of Being =

Studio album by Tesseract
- Released: 15 September 2023
- Recorded: 2022
- Studio: Middle Farm Studios, Newton Abbot, Devon
- Genre: Progressive metal; djent
- Length: 60:43
- Label: Kscope
- Producer: Tesseract; Peter Miles

Tesseract chronology
| Sonder (2018) | War of Being (2023) |

Singles from War of Being
- 1. "War of Being" Released: 12 July 2023; 2. "The Grey" Released: 16 August 2023; 3. "Legion" Released: 13 September 2023; 4. "Echoes" Released: 4 October 2023

War of Being is the fifth studio album by British progressive metal band Tesseract. The album was released on 15 September 2023 through Kscope. It was self-produced by the band and Peter Miles.

The album is a concept album that tells the story of two characters called Ex and El, who crashland a spaceship on a planet they call The Strangeland, with singer Daniel Tompkins using distinct vocal techniques to represent the various characters.

== Background and promotion ==
On 24 May 2022, Tesseract announced that they were beginning to record the new album. On 26 September, the band's rhythm guitarist James Monteith shared that recording sessions have wrapped for the album.

On 12 July 2023, Tesseract published the lead single and title track "War of Being" and an accompanying music video. At the same time, they officially announced the album itself and release date, whilst also revealing the album cover and the track list. On 16 August, Tesseract unveiled the second single "The Grey". On 13 September, two days before the album release, the band released the third single "Legion" along with a music video.

=== War of Being video game ===
On 7 August, the band announced a video game to coincide with the release of the album. The game is compatible with both VR and desktop platforms and was developed with Unreal Engine 5. A gameplay trailer for the project is available on YouTube. The game further explores the concept of the album; it was released in early access on Steam on 11 August. Vocalist Daniel Tompkins serves as the game's lead designer.

== Critical reception ==
Professional ratings
Review scores
| Source | Rating |
|---|---|
| Blabbermouth.net | 9/10 |
| Distorted Sound | 10/10 |
| Kerrang! | 4/5 stars |
| Louder Sound | 4.5/5 stars |
| Wall of Sound | 9.5/10 |

The album received critical acclaim from critics. Dom Lawson from Blabbermouth.net gave the album 9 out of 10 and said: "As certified standard bearers for this kind of ultra-contemporary progressive metal, Tesseract do not really need to take risks with their music like this. But War of Being, for all its familiar moments, is the bravest and boldest record they have made to date. The sound of a great band discovering multiple new paths to greatness is something to behold." Dan McHugh of Distorted Sound scored the album 10 out of 10 and said: "Very few bands can acquire your full attention span for an hour but Tesseract aren't just your average bunch of musicians. They're frontrunners, flagbearers and continue to astound with their abundance of talents. The instrumentation and overarching concept encourage the listener to dig deeper into every nuance and how it plays a part in the overall product and this will take multiple playthroughs to fully appreciate. Another stunning release from metal's great innovators." Kerrang! gave the album 4 out of 5 and stated: "What they do so wonderfully on this album is deliver complexity without sacrificing melody and accessibility. From start to finish, War of Being will take you on an introspective journey, leaving you wanting to embark on the experience again and again. This could well be their most important album to date."

Louder Sound gave the album a positive review and stated: "In that way, War of Being couldn't have hit a more appropriate end. It's a comprehensive masterpiece that summarises every emotional frequency and style of songwriting that Tesseract have touched since they emerged. Instantly, it's affirmed itself as this band's quintessential release – not to mention a frontrunner for metal album of the year." Wall of Sound scored the album 9.5/10 and wrote: "War of Being is an album that starts incredibly strongly and only gets better and better as it goes along. In fact, it's one of those records that is more than just a band's new album, it's an experience, a mind-expanding journey into breathtaking heavy music soundscapes."

== Track listing ==
All lyrics are written by Daniel Tompkins; additional lyrics by Katherine Marsh; all music is composed by Acle Kahney; additional music by Amos Williams, Katherine Marsh and Aidan O'brien.

War of Being track listing
| No. | Title | Length |
|---|---|---|
| 1. | "Natural Disaster" | 6:06 |
| 2. | "Echoes" | 5:46 |
| 3. | "The Grey" | 6:07 |
| 4. | "Legion" | 6:00 |
| 5. | "Tender" | 4:37 |
| 6. | "War of Being" | 11:02 |
| 7. | "Sirens" | 4:57 |
| 8. | "Burden" | 6:34 |
| 9. | "Sacrifice" | 9:34 |
| Total length: | | 60:43 |

== Personnel ==
Tesseract

- Daniel Tompkins – lead vocals, backing vocals, engineering, concept
- Acle Kahney – guitar, engineering, mixing, mastering, composition
- James 'Metal' Monteith – guitar
- Amos Williams – bass, engineering, composition, concept, layout, design
- Jay Postones – drums

Additional personnel

- Tesseract – production, arranging
- Peter Miles – production, engineering, arranging, synth, sound design
- Randy Slaugh – co-production, engineering, synth, sound design
- Katherine Marsh – co-production, engineering, arranging, composition, backing vocals
- Forrester Savell – co-production, engineering
- Isambard Warburton – engineering
- Aidan O'brien – composition
- Shatner Bassoon – artwork
- Scott Robinson – layout, design

== Charts ==
Chart performance for War of Being
| Chart (2023) | Peak position |
|---|---|
| German Albums (Offizielle Top 100) | 68 |
| Scottish Albums (Official Charts) | 24 |
| UK Album Downloads (Official Charts) | 13 |
| UK Independent Albums (Official Charts) | 9 |
| UK Progressive Albums (Official Charts) | 9 |
| UK Rock & Metal Albums (Official Charts) | 4 |
