= Polaris (Tesseract album) =

Studio album by Tesseract
- Released: 18 September 2015
- Recorded: January–April 2015
- Genre: Progressive metal; djent
- Length: 46:45
- Label: Kscope
- Producer: Acle Kahney; Aidan O'Brien; Amos Williams

Tesseract chronology
| Altered State (2013) | Polaris (2015) | Sonder (2018) |

Singles from Polaris
- 1. "Messenger" Released: 3 August 2015; 2. "Survival" Released: 3 September 2015

Polaris is the third studio album by British progressive metal band Tesseract. It was released on 18 September 2015, both digitally and physically on vinyl and CD. There is also a 2-disc version with the album mixed in 5.1 surround sound.

== Background ==
Tesseract parted ways with vocalist Ashe O'Hara in June 2014 and invited original vocalist Daniel Tompkins back into the band. Tompkins, who had been dedicated full-time to the band Skyharbor, agreed to return, and writing for a third Tesseract album commenced.

The first single from the album, "Messenger", was released on 3 August 2015 on Kscope's YouTube and SoundCloud pages. The second single from the album, "Survival" was then released on 3 September 2015 along with the video for the same. The video was filmed and directed by Pele Newell with the Derbyshire landscape as the backdrop.

== Critical reception ==
Professional ratings
Aggregate scores
| Source | Rating |
|---|---|
| Metacritic | 74/100 |
Review scores
| Source | Rating |
| AllMusic | 3.5/5 stars |
| Exclaim! | 7/10 stars |
| Metal Injection | 8.5/10 stars |
| Sputnikmusic | 3/5 stars |
| the AU Review | 9.8/10 stars |

Polaris received generally positive reviews. Review aggregate Metacritic gave the album a 74 out of 100 based on 6 professional critics. Tom Jurek of AllMusic gave the album a positive review saying "Polaris is the record that Tesseract have been working toward. The evolved maturity of their writing, playing, and arranging is matched by the experience and confidence Tomkins gained while away. Reunited, they deliver not only creativity and sophistication but inspiration." Thompson D. Gerhart of Sputnikmusic gave the album a mixed review.

The most positive feedback came from the AU Review's Dave Roberts, who called it "one of the most amazing albums" of 2015 and compared the album to masterpieces by other artists, for instance Dream Theater's Octavarium and Stanley Kubrick's 2001: A Space Odyssey, and sums up his review as follows: "In short, if you are a fan of djent music, buy this album. If you like metal, do the same. If you like music, do it. You know what, just get it."

== Track listing ==
All tracks are written by Acle Kahney, Aidan O'Brien and Daniel Tompkins

| No. | Title | Length |
|---|---|---|
| 1. | "Dystopia" | 6:51 |
| 2. | "Hexes" | 5:18 |
| 3. | "Survival" | 4:25 |
| 4. | "Tourniquet" | 5:59 |
| 5. | "Utopia" | 5:34 |
| 6. | "Phoenix" | 3:54 |
| 7. | "Messenger" | 3:35 |
| 8. | "Cages" | 5:29 |
| 9. | "Seven Names" | 5:40 |
| Total length: | | 46:45 |

== Personnel ==
Tesseract

- Daniel Tompkins – lead vocals
- Acle Kahney – lead guitar, production, mixing, mastering, drum programming
- James 'Metal' Monteith – rhythm guitar
- Amos Williams – bass, growls, backing vocals, production
- Jay Postones – drums, percussion

Additional musicians

- Martin Grech – additional vocals (track 2)

Additional personnel

- Aidan O'Brien – production, additional composition
- Bruce Soord of The Pineapple Thief – 5.1 mixing
- Simon C. Page – artwork

== Charts ==
| Chart (2015) | Peak position |
|---|---|
| Scottish Albums (OCC) | 65 |
| UK Albums (OCC) | 65 |
| US Billboard 200 | 120 |
