= March of the Lonely =

March Of The Lonely

Studio album by Martin Grech
- Released: 4 June 2007 (UK)
- Recorded: 2007
- Genre: Experimental rock Apocalyptic folk Folk rock
- Length: 45:28
- Label: Genepool Records
- Producer: Andy Ross

Martin Grech chronology
Unholy (2005)	March Of The Lonely (2007)	Hush Mortal Core (2020)

Singles from March of the Lonely
- 1. "The Heritage" Released: April 2007

March Of The Lonely is the third studio album by British musician Martin Grech, released on 4 June 2007.

Professional ratings
Review scores
Source	Rating
Drowned in Sound	(7/10)
Rock Sound	(8/10)

== Track listing ==
1. "Treasures" – 1:41
2. "Kingdom" – 3:39
3. "The Heritage" – 4:03
4. "Ashes Over Embers" – 5:41
5. "The Washing Hands" – 4:32
6. "Soul Sirens" – 5:22
7. "Ruins" – 3:46
8. "The Giving Hands" – 4:04
9. "All Lovers Learn" – 4:36
10. "Heiress" - 2:28
11. "March Of The Lonely" - 5:56
