= Sadia Sadia =

British installation artist, songwriter and music producer

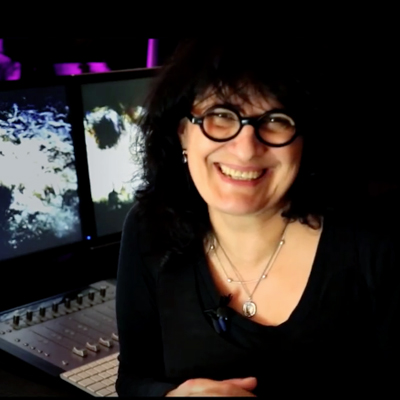
- Occupation: Installation artist
- Website: Chimera Arts

Sadia Sadia is a Canadian-born British installation artist, known for her audiovisual media work, incorporating sound and images, both still and moving.

== Education ==
Sadia received her MSc in Political Science and Economics (Gender, Culture and Society) from Birkbeck, University of London in 1994, MA in Design Studies from Central Saint Martins, University of the Arts in 2001, and PhD in Fine Art from the Royal Melbourne Institute of Technology in 2019. She is a Senior Industry Fellow at RMIT and a Fellow of the Royal Society of Arts.

== Career ==
=== Music ===
From 1978 to 1993, Sadia worked largely with the Canadian guitar player David Wilcox, producing nine albums including Out of the Woods, My Eyes Keep Me in Trouble, Bad Reputation, Breakfast at the Circus, and The Natural Edge, four of which reached gold or platinum status in Canada. These albums also formed the basis of two platinum-selling greatest hits packages 'The Best of...' and 'Over Sixty Minutes With...'.

In 1993, Sadia co-founded the multimedia world fusion project Equa with Stephen W. Tayler. Signed to Polygram (Australia) in 1997, the band's eponymously titled Equa was nominated for the ARIA Award for Best World Music Album.

During the 1990s she sat as the only female director of the British Record Producer's Guild.

=== Film ===
Sadia produced and edited multiple films working with Anthony Stern. In 2004, Sadia and Stephen W. Tayler as Equa also scored Stern's short film The Noon Gun, which was shortlisted for the Satyajit Ray Foundation short film competition and has been shown in multiple film festivals, including the 2004 Melbourne International Film Festival and the 2007 Portobello Film Festival.

In 2008, Sadia co-directed San Francisco Redux No. 1, an avant-garde short film that premiered at Cinémathèque Française. Sadia also directed, produced and edited a short documentary film on Stern's works titled Lit From Within: The Film and Glass Works of Anthony Stern. Sadia produced and edited Stern's The End of the Party: Hyde Park 1969, a view of the 60's based on footage of the first performance by Blind Faith in Hyde Park, and Iggy the Eskimo Girl, a short featuring musician Syd Barrett's girlfriend Iggy.

=== Installations ===
Sadia is the creator of the single channel video installation The Memory of Water (Part 1) which was acquired by the Australian Centre for the Moving Image (ACMI) to form part of its permanent collection. It was included in the ACMI's exhibition Proof: The Act of Seeing With One's Own Eyes.

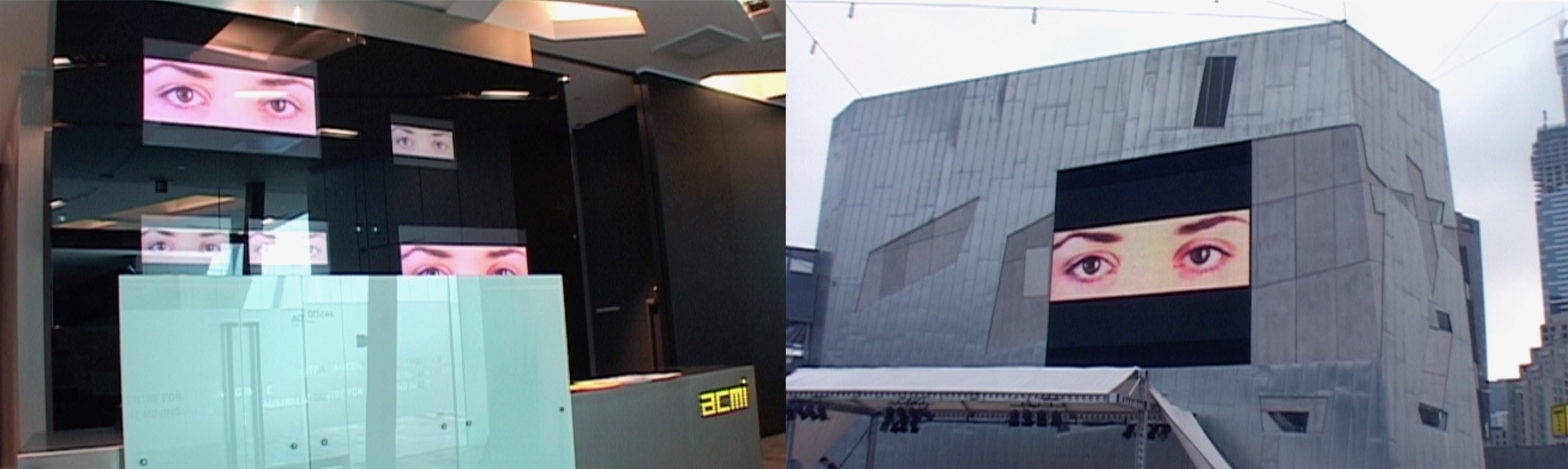
Installation artist Sadia Sadia’s work 'The Memory of Water (part I) displayed on internal and external screens at ACMI Australian Centre for the Moving Image, Federation Square, Melbourne 2004.

In January 2014, Sadia completed All Time and Space Fold into the Infinite Present (Cataract Gorge) a large-scale three channel filmed installation with an accompanying eight channel soundfield. The work features footage of the rapids captured by the artist in Cataract Gorge, Launceston, Tasmania. The footage has been slowed down and colour balanced to resemble deep space, while the motion remains that of the water. The accompanying eight channel soundfield is constructed of audio captured by the artist in the Gorge. The work premiered at the Queen Victoria Museum and Art Gallery (QVMAG) in Tasmania, Australia, in 2014, and has since been acquired by the museum for their permanent collection.

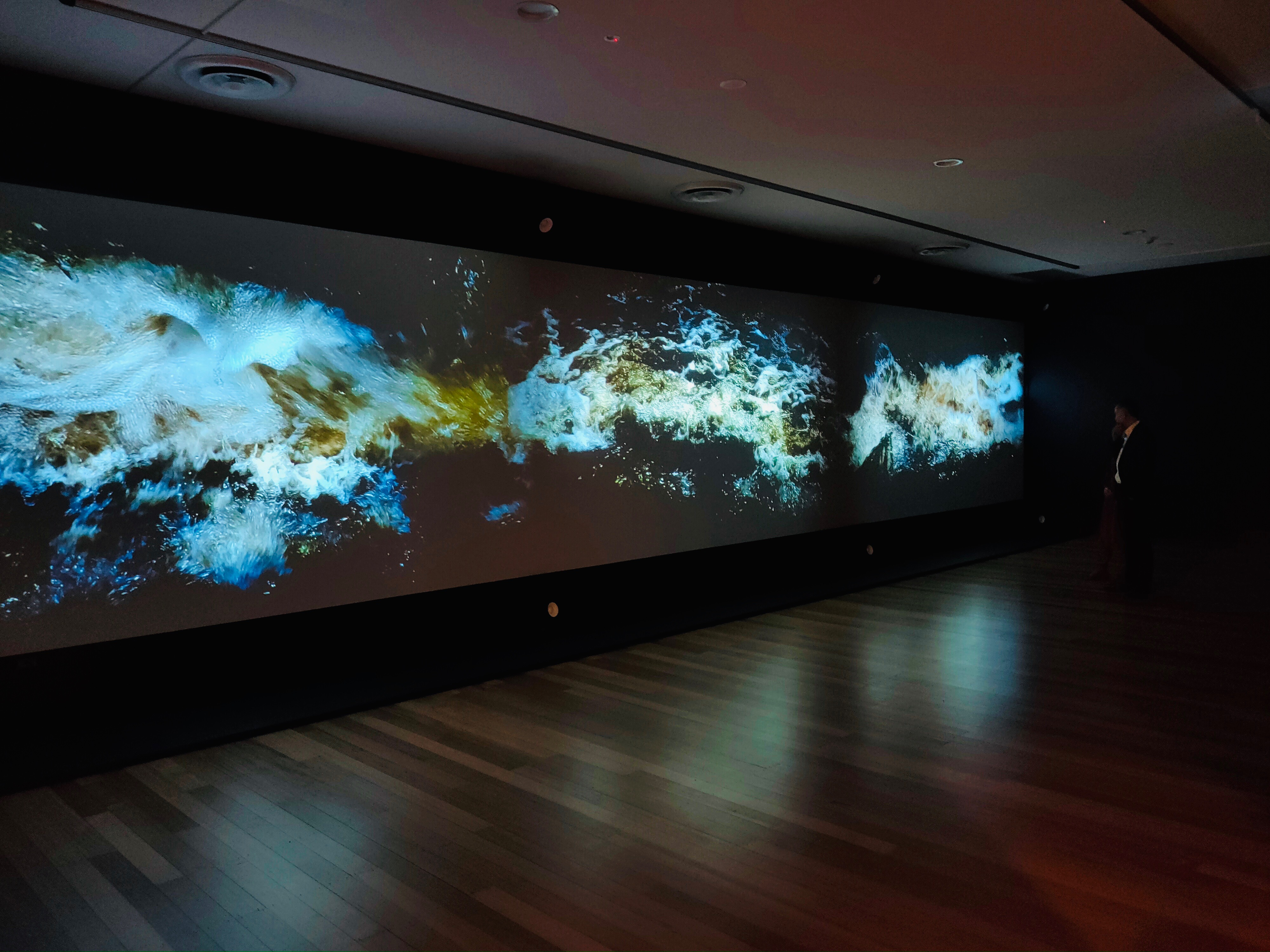
Sadia Sadia, 'All Time and Space Fold Into the Infinite Present'

In September 2014, Sadia premiered her 30-channel audio installation Notes to an Unknown Lover at Spinnerei Rundgang in Leipzig, Germany., based on her self-published artist's book with the same title. She also premiered her installation ‘Fugue: Die Wende, created in collaboration with Stephen Tayler and Darren Munce, at Halle 14 Zentrum für zeitgenössische Kunst (Centre for Contemporary Art) as part of the City of Leipzig's Lichtfest 2014 Kulturparcours.

In June 2015, Ghosts of Noise was screened and discussed as part of the international colloquium Les Devenirs Artistiques de L’Information at Sorbonne Paris, co-sponsored by Le Bauhaus-Universität Weimar & Internationales Kolleg für Kulturtechnikforschung und Medienphilosophie (IKKM), the Birmingham Center for Media and Cultural Research, and ELICO Equipe de recherche de Lyon.

In 2019, Ghosts of Noise was exhibited as a four-channel video and eight channel audio installation in The Model Citizen at the RMIT Gallery, Melbourne, curated by Sean Redmond and Darrin Verhagen.
