= Massimo Di Cataldo =

Italian singer and actor

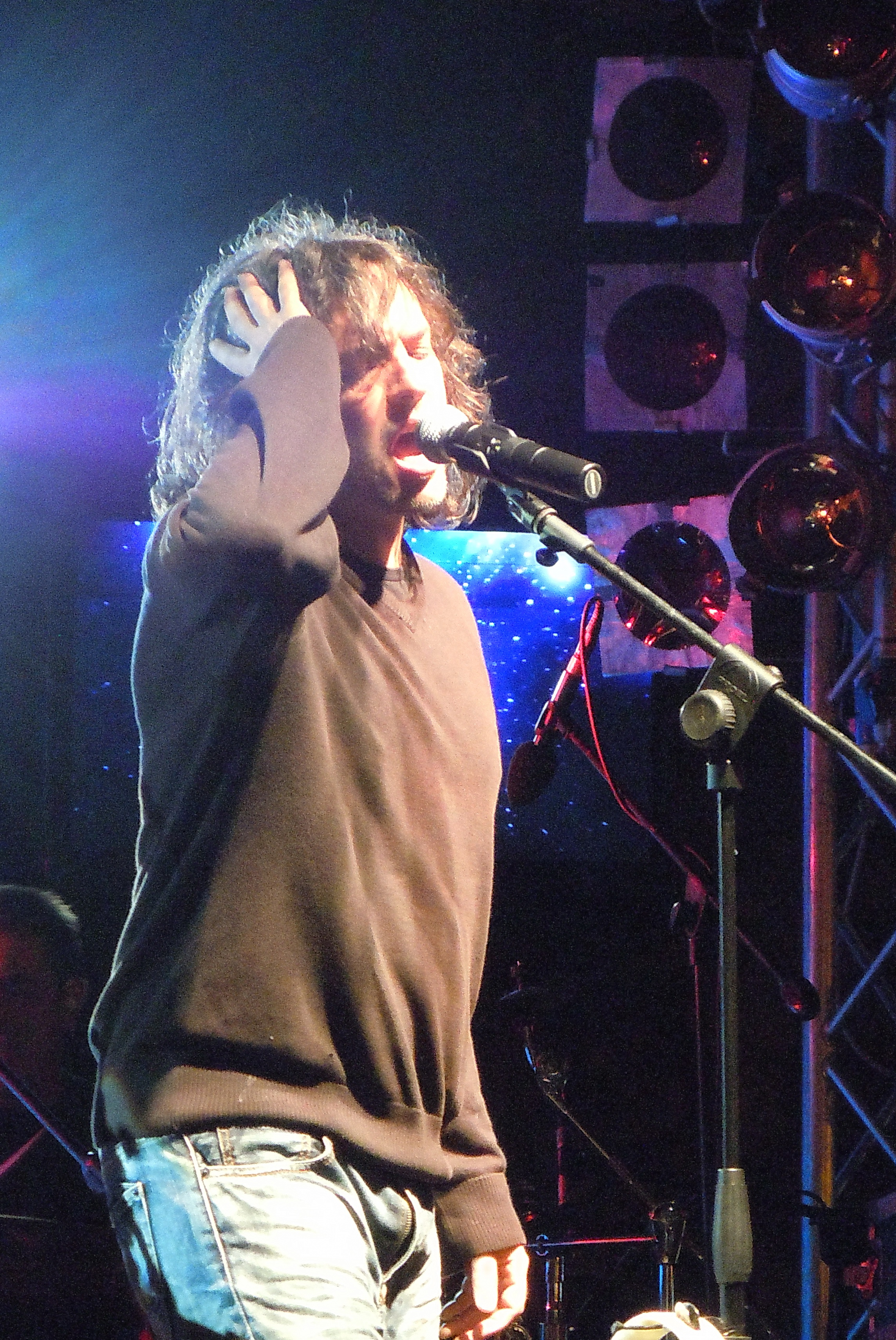
- Di Cataldo in concert
- Born: 25 April 1968 (age 58); Rome, Italy
- Occupation: Singer-songwriter

Massimo Di Cataldo (born 25 April 1968) is an Italian singer-songwriter and actor.

== Life and career ==
Born in Rome, after the high school Di Cataldo made several experiences poised between singing and acting, including a 1993 appearance in the Rai 2 TV-series I ragazzi del muretto in which he played a singer. The same year he was a finalist in the Castrocaro Music Festival.

In 1995, Di Cataldo entered the competition at the Sanremo Music Festival with the song "Che sarà di me", ranking second in the newcomers section. The same year he released his debut album, Siamo nati liberi, which was a commercial success replicated a year later by the album Anime (whose lead single, "Se adesso te ne vai", ranked fourth at the Big Artists competition of the Sanremo Music Festival) and in 1997 by the album Crescendo.

In 1999, Di Cataldo participated for the third and last time at the Sanremo Festival with the song "Come sei bella", which was followed by the album Dieci. In the following years he mainly focused on live performances and concerts.

In 2013 he received the Menzione Antologica of the Premio Lunezia, an Italian award for the musical and literary value of songs, for "Se adesso te ne vai"; the mention was given by the newspapers La Nazione and Il Tirreno.

== Discography ==
=== Studio albums ===
- 1995 - Siamo nati liberi
- 1996 - Libres como el viento
- 1996 - Anime
- 1997 - Con el alma
- 1997 - Crescendo
- 1999 - Dieci
- 2002 - Veramente
- 2005 - Sulla mia strada
- 2009 – Macchissenefrega
- 2019 – Dal profondo

=== Compilation albums ===
- 1997 – Best of Massimo Di Cataldo
- 2001 – Il mio tempo
- 2006 – I consigli del cuore
- 2015 – Addendum
