= Anthony Stern =

British documentary filmmaker (1944–2022)

Anthony Stern (26 October 1944 – 10 February 2022) was a British experimental filmmaker and glass maker. He first started making films while at Cambridge University, then worked as assistant to the avant-garde documentary film maker Peter Whitehead.

== Biography ==
Stern was born in Cambridge, England, on 26 October 1944. At the age of 18, Stern and Syd Barrett held a joint painting exhibition in Cambridge. He later moved to London and became involved in the film and music scene. Stern made films, took photographs, and amassed a body of work which eventually grew into an archive.

Stern developed the concept of the impressionistic documentary with his BFI financed work San Francisco: Film, which was produced by Iris Sawyer, Jeremy Mitchell, Anthony and his friend Alan Callan. The film was cut to one of the first recordings of "Interstellar Overdrive" performed by Pink Floyd, whose lead guitarist Syd Barrett was a friend of Stern's. It won awards for cinematography at the Oberhausen, Melbourne and Sydney Film Festivals.

Later he began developing a non linear film concept with Syd Barrett called "Wheel", an impressionistic piece, which was designed to be seen many times, with each viewing the audience making new discoveries.

On 14 April 1969, Stern went to the Royal Festival Hall to film Pink Floyd as they rehearsed for their 'Man/Journey' show, billed as 'The Massed Gadgets of Auximenes' – More Furious Madness from Pink Floyd. The filming was interrupted by a RFH official who demanded he stop as no permission to film had been granted by RFH officials.

Stern also made the experimental films 'Serendipity' and 'Ain't Misbehavin'", pioneering the use of 16 mm single frame cinematography in the late 1960s.

Pursuing his fascination with colour and materials through which light passes, Stern completed an MA at the Royal College of Art in Glass and was a glass maker. His work is included in the collections of Queen Elizabeth II, Sir Elton John, the Saudi Royal Family (Red Sea Palace), the Victoria & Albert Museum, Barclays Bank, Morgan Stanley, the Nomura Group, Sir Derek Jacobi, and the Broadfield House Glass Museum, to name but a few. Anthony's work as a glass artist has also been the subject of the film 'Lit From Within: The Art of Anthony Stern'.

In 2004, Anthony completed work on his film 'The Noon Gun', based on material filmed in 1971, when Stern travelled to Afghanistan with his 16 mm camera. The footage, rediscovered in 2003, forms the basis of this film-poem, which features a soundtrack by the world fusion musicians Equa.

Produced and edited by the multi-media artist and director Sadia Sadia, working with the composer and sound designer Stephen W Tayler, the film had its world premiere at the Melbourne International Film Festival. Since then it has been shown in the UK at the National Museum of Photography, Film and Television, as well as featuring in the 2005 'Films From The South' Festival in Oslo, Norway. Stern attended the Festival as a guest speaker, supported by the British Council. Subsequently, then the film has been broadcast on Tolo TV, the most popular liberal TV station in Kabul, Afghanistan, as well as on the Bhutan Broadcasting Service (the only service to broadcast within the Bhutanese border).

In 2016, Lost and Found: The Memory Marbles of Anthony Stern, a compilation of films and photos by Stern were featured on BBC4 as part of a series of programmes curated by Keith Richards and Julien Temple, known collectively as Keith Richards' Lost Weekend.

Stern died on 10 February 2022, at the age of 77.
