= One (Tesseract album) =

Studio album by Tesseract
- Released: 22 March 2011
- Recorded: Metropolis Studios, UK and 4D Sounds
- Genre: Progressive metal; djent
- Length: 54:31
- Label: Century Media
- Producer: Acle Kahney; Amos Williams; Francesco Cameli

Tesseract chronology
Concealing Fate (2010)	One (2011)	Perspective (2012)

Singles from One
- 1. "Nascent" Released: 4 February 2011

Professional ratings
Review scores
Source	Rating
AllMusic	3.5/5 stars
Bloody Disgusting	(positive)
PopMatters	8/10 stars

One is the debut studio album by British progressive metal band Tesseract. Released on 22 March 2011, the album features six tracks. The third track, "Concealing Fate", was split into six parts for a total length of twenty seven minutes and forty seconds. This was Tesseract's only full-length release with vocalist Daniel Tompkins until his return in 2014. A bonus track entitled "Hollow" was released digitally to those who pre-ordered One from Century Media.

A live studio play through of "Concealing Fate" was also included as a bonus DVD along with the album. In September 2011, an instrumental version was released digitally and in October that year both the album and the instrumental version were released on vinyl as a double LP. "Nascent" was released as a promotional single in February 2011, and music videos were released for both "Nascent" and "Deception". Acoustic renditions of "Perfection", "April" and "Origin" were featured on the band's second EP Perspective, which released the following year.

In 2024, Loudwire elected it as one of the 11 best progressive metal debut albums.

== Track listing ==
All tracks are written by Acle Kahney and Daniel Tompkins.

No.	Title	Length
1.	"Lament"	4:53
2.	"Nascent"	4:09
3.	"Concealing Fate: 1. "Acceptance" (8:33); 2. "Deception" (5:22); 3. "The Impossible" (4:50); 4. "Perfection" (2:38); 5. "Epiphany" (1:29); 6. "Origin" (4:44); "	27:36
4.	"Sunrise"	3:57
5.	"April"	4:49
6.	"Eden"	9:08
Total length:		54:31

Pre-order bonus track
No.	Title	Length
7.	"Hollow"	4:22
Total length:		58:53

== Personnel ==
Tesseract

- Daniel Tompkins – lead vocals
- Acle Kahney – lead guitar, programming, mixing, digital editing, engineering
- James 'Metal' Monteith – rhythm guitar
- Amos Williams – bass, growls, backing vocals, artwork design, programming, mixing, digital editing, production
- Jay Postones – drums, percussion

Additional personnel

- Francesco Cameli – engineering, mixing, production
- Rob Mestas – post-production, digital editing
- Greg Marriott and Ronan Phelan – additional engineering
- Mo Panella – digital editing
- Andrew Baldwin – mastering

== Chart performance ==
Chart (2011)	Peak position
Billboard Top Hotseekers	36
