= The Noon Gun =

- Directed by: Anthony Stern
- Produced by: Sadia Sadia
- Cinematography: Anthony Stern
- Edited by: Stephen W. Tayler, Sadia Sadia
- Music by: Equa
- Distributed by: Chimera Arts (UK)
- Release date: 8 August 2004
- Running time: 28 minutes
- Country: United Kingdom
- Language: English

The Noon Gun is a 2004 documentary film directed by Anthony Stern. In 1971, the experimental film maker Anthony Stern travelled to Afghanistan with his 16 mm film camera. The footage was lost for almost 30 years. Recently rediscovered, it forms the basis of this impressionistic documentary, with an original soundtrack provided by the world fusion musicians Equa.

The Noon Gun had its world premiere at the 53rd Melbourne International Film Festival (MIFF) in 2004. It premiered in the UK at the National Museum of Photography, Film and Television in Bradford (now the National Media Museum), September 2004. In 2005 it also featured as part of 'Films From The South' Festival in Oslo, Norway. In 2006 it was broadcast on Tolo TV, the most popular liberal TV station in Kabul, Afghanistan (and also by the Bhutan Broadcasting Service, the only service to broadcast inside the Bhutanese border).

The Noon Gun was shortlisted, along with 6 other films, for The Satyajit Ray Foundation Short Film Competition in London. A number of extracts from the entries were screened at the Award Ceremony held in the David Lean Room of the British Academy of Film and Television Arts (BAFTA), Piccadilly, London on the afternoon of Sunday 23 April 2006.
