= Howard Jones =

Howard Jones may refer to:

- Howard Jones (British musician) (born 1955), English pop singer
- Howard Jones (American singer) (born 1970), American metalcore vocalist
- Howard Jones (American football coach) (1885–1941), American football player and coach
- Howard Jones (linebacker) (born 1990), American football player
- Howard Mumford Jones (1892–1980), American critic and educator
- Howard Andrew Jones (1968–2025), American speculative fiction author
- Howard P. Jones (1899–1973), American diplomat
- Howard Jones, professor and author of Mutiny on the Amistad, basis for film Amistad
- Howard W. Jones (1910–2015), American physician who pioneered in vitro fertilization in the United States
- Howard Sutton Jones (1835–1912), Royal Marines officer
- Howard Jones (sprinter) (born 1910), American sprinter, 3rd in the 400 m at the 1934 USA Outdoor Track and Field Championships
