= Open Heart Zoo =

Studio album by Martin Grech
- Released: 22 July 2002
- Recorded: 2002
- Genre: Experimental rock; alternative rock
- Length: 1:09:56
- Label: Island
- Producer: Andy Ross

Martin Grech chronology
Open Heart Zoo (2002)	Unholy (2005)

Singles from Open Heart Zoo
- 1. "Dali" / "Catch Up" Released: 1 July 2002; 2. "Open Heart Zoo" Released: 30 September 2002; 3. "Push" Released: 27 January 2003

Open Heart Zoo is a debut album by British alternative rock musician Martin Grech released in 2002. Its title track came to the attention of the public when it was used by Lexus in a commercial, and was released as a single on 30 September 2002.

Professional ratings
Review scores
Source	Rating
The Guardian	4/5 stars
Sputnikmusic	4.5/5 stars
Drowned in Sound	9/10 stars

== Track listing ==
1. "Here It Comes" – 5:02
2. "Open Heart Zoo" – 5:20
3. "Dalí" – 5:38
4. "Tonight" – 5:07
5. "Push" – 4:59
6. "Only One Listening" – 4:51
7. "Notorious" – 4:55
8. "Penicillin" – 4:47
9. "Catch Up" – 3:46
10. "Twin" – 4:41
11. "Death of a Loved One" – 20:50*
- The duration of "Death of a Loved One" is 6:53 — there is then a 10:05 silence before the bonus track — "Ill" (ill) begins. The duration of "Ill" is 3:52.

== Charts ==
Chart (2002)	Peak position
UK Albums (OCC)	54
