= Altered State (Tesseract album) =

Studio album by Tesseract
- Released: 27 May 2013
- Recorded: 2012–2013
- Studio: 4D Sounds Studio (Recording, mixing & mastering)
- Genre: Progressive metal; djent
- Length: 50:41
- Label: Century Media
- Producer: Acle Kahney; Amos Williams

Tesseract chronology
Perspective (2012)	Altered State (2013)	Polaris (2015)

Singles from Altered State
- 1. "Nocturne" Released: 12 October 2012

Altered State is the second studio album by British progressive metal band Tesseract, released on 27 May 2013 on Century Media Records.

Professional ratings
Aggregate scores
Source	Rating
Metacritic	85/100
Review scores
Source	Rating
AllMusic	4/5 stars
Bloody Disgusting	5/5 stars
Exclaim!	7/10
Kerrang!	4/5 stars
Revolver	4/5 stars
Rock Sound	9/10

== Background and recording ==
Altered State is the only full release by the band with vocalist Ashe O'Hara. Amos Williams stated about the new singer: "It's amazing how much one person can change a band. Ashe is full of life and wit. It's brilliant to have such a guy around. You know, we're still Tesseract, but with a slightly more energetic and vibrant colour about us now". Live drums for the album could not be recorded due to financial and time restraints; drums were partially programmed by guitarist Acle Kahney and partially played by drummer Jay Postones on a digital percussion pad.

== Release and promotion ==
The band released their first single, "Nocturne", on 12 October 2012; it was officially uploaded to the Century Media Records' YouTube channel. On the same day "Nocturne" was available as a free download through the Century Media Records' SoundCloud website. On 15 March 2013 the band announced pre-order bundles as well as the official album artwork.

During the months of March and April the band released four trailers leading up to the full album stream of Altered State on 12 May 2013. The album debuted at #94 on the Billboard 200 and at #4 on the Billboard Top Hard Rock Albums.

== Reception ==
Altered State has received universal critical acclaim. On the review aggregator site Metacritic the album has received the score of 85 out of 100, based on five reviews. New Noise Magazine gave the album a five-star rating, saying: "Altered State is not only a masterpiece of progressive metal, this is truly one of the greatest albums ever made, period." Bloody Disgusting website also gave the album a 5/5, saying: "With their sophomore album Altered State, Tesseract have cemented themselves as one of the most creative, daring, and innovative bands of today", whilst The Monolith online magazine called it "probably one of the most complete examples of the genre to date."

== Track listing ==
All tracks are written by Acle Kahney and Ashe O'Hara.

No.	Title	Length
1.	"Of Matter: 1. "Proxy" (5:04); 2. "Retrospect" (5:32); 3. "Resist" (3:40); "	14:16
2.	"Of Mind: 1. "Nocturne" (5:50); 2. "Exiled" (8:50); "	14:40
3.	"Of Reality: 1. "Eclipse" (5:03); 2. "Palingenesis" (2:46); 3. "Calabi-Yau" (2:00); "	9:49
4.	"Of Energy: 1. "Singularity" (8:20); 2. "Embers" (3:36); "	11:56
Total length:		50:41

== Personnel ==
- Ashe O'Hara – lead vocals
- Acle Kahney – lead guitar, production, drum programming
- James 'Metal' Monteith – rhythm guitar
- Amos Williams – bass, growls, backing vocals, production
- Jay Postones – drums, percussion

Additional musicians

- Chris Barretto – guest saxophone on tracks "Of Reality – Calabi-Yau" and "Of Energy – Embers"
- Paul Waggoner – guest guitar solo on track "Of Mind – Nocturne"

Additional personnel

- Ion Lucin – artwork
