= Tesseract (band) =

British progressive metal band

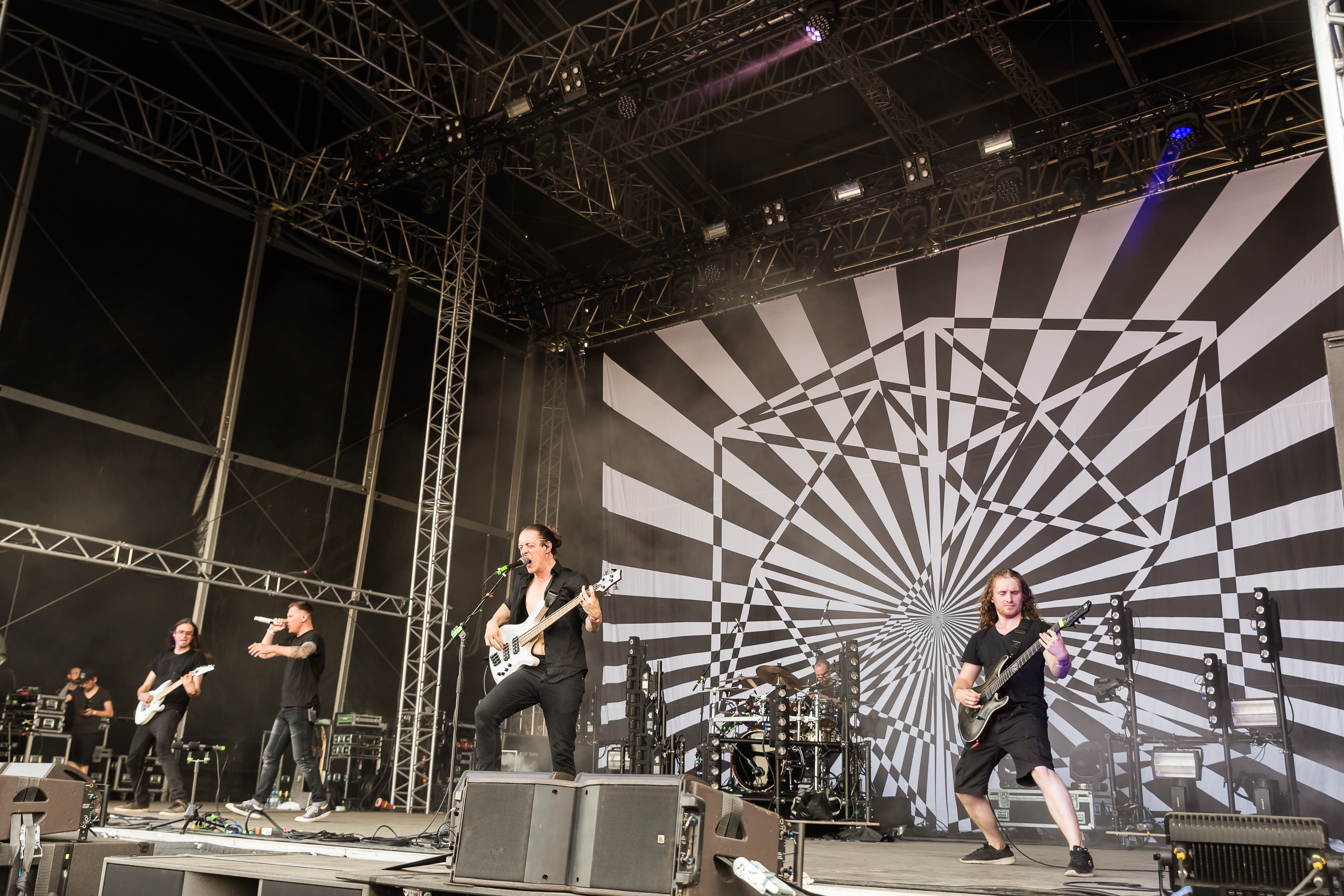
- Tesseract live at With Full Force 2019

Background information
- Origin: Milton Keynes, England
- Genres: Progressive metal; djent
- Years active: 2003–present
- Labels: Nuclear Blast Records; Kscope; Century Media
- Members: Acle Kahney; Jay Postones; Amos Williams; Daniel Tompkins
- Past members: Julien Perier; Abisola Obasanya; Elliot Coleman; Ashe O'Hara; James Monteith
- Website: tesseractband.co.uk

Tesseract (often stylised as TesseracT) are a British progressive metal band from Milton Keynes. The band, formed in 2003, consists of Daniel Tompkins (lead vocals), Alec "Acle" Kahney (guitar, producer), Amos Williams (bass, backing vocals) and Jay Postones (drums, percussion). The band is currently signed to Kscope. They are credited as one of the bands to pioneer the djent movement in progressive metal. As of 2025, Tesseract have released five studio albums: One, Altered State, Polaris, Sonder and War of Being, as well as three live albums, Odyssey/Scala, Portals, and Radar O.S.T, and the extended plays Concealing Fate, Perspective, Errai and Regrowth.

== History ==
=== Early years (2003–2009) ===
Tesseract started out in 2003 while founding member Acle Kahney was recording and writing with his band Mikaw Barish. Kahney was also involved in the unofficial predecessor to Tesseract, Fellsilent. French vocalist Julien Perier supplied vocals during Tesseract's early stages, but the logistical difficulties of distance meant that he could not join the band permanently. After their first full line-up was realised, Tesseract began playing live shows and compiling material for their debut album; they released a three-song demo in 2007 containing parts of what would eventually become their debut album, One.

=== One (2009–2011) ===
In 2009, the original lead vocalist, Abisola Obasanya, left the band and was replaced by Daniel Tompkins. Acle had come into contact with Tompkins while assisting with the production of the album, Atlantic with his previous band, First Signs of Frost. The band reworked the album's songs with Tompkins, moving towards a 2010 release. Just before beginning their first major tour series, Tesseract released Concealing Fate, a six-track suite that forms the centrepiece of their debut album, One, which was released on 22 March 2011. Later that year, Tesseract toured throughout the UK in support of One with openers Chimp Spanner and Uneven Structure, and also performed at the Sonisphere Festival in Knebworth.

=== Perspective EP (2011–2012) ===
On 20 August 2011, rumours began spreading that vocalist Daniel Tompkins had left the band, as Tesseract were seen performing with a different vocalist during a gig at the Craufurd Arms in Milton Keynes. This was confirmed by the band a few days later on 23 August, when they introduced Elliot Coleman as the band's new vocalist. Daniel Tompkins went on to sing for the progressive metal band, Skyharbor, the pop rock band, In Colour, and his experimental side project White Moth Black Butterfly.

In September 2011, an instrumental version of One was digitally released and in October 2011, both the original and the instrumental versions were released on vinyl as a double LP.

During early 2012, Tesseract worked on an acoustic EP inspired by the radio acoustic session they played in Brooklyn, New York a year before. This came to be known as Perspective, which was released on 25 May 2012.

=== Altered State (2012–2014) ===
On 12 June 2012, Tesseract announced that Coleman had amicably left the band. On 7 September 2012, the band announced that they had found their yet-unnamed new vocalist and would release the single, "Nocturne", on 12 October. A series of shows in Europe was also announced, including a performance at Euroblast Festival. It was later revealed that the new singer was Ashe O'Hara of British progressive metal band Voices from the Fuselage. Tesseract issued a short statement about the new vocalist on their website.

On 28 February 2013, the band unveiled a release date for Altered State alongside a full track listing of the album. The album is a 51-minute continuous piece divided into four large sections (Of Matter, Of Mind, Of Reality, Of Energy), each of which contains several tracks. On 30 April, "Singularity" was aired on BBC Radio 1's Rock show, and was later released on their SoundCloud account.

During a phone interview with Metal Injection, Williams stated that the band would be going on tour in the United States during the summer of 2013 and touring Europe in late 2013.

Altered State was streamed in its entirety on 12 May 2013 on Century Media's official YouTube channel, two weeks before its 27 May release.

=== Odyssey/Scala, Polaris and Errai EP (2014–2016) ===
On 27 June 2014, it was announced that Ashe O'Hara had left the band and that Dan Tompkins would be rejoining, leaving Skyharbor in the process. On 18 May 2015, Tesseract released Odyssey/Scala, their first live DVD and album compilation.

Shortly after Daniel Tompkins reunited with the band, writing and recording for a third studio album began. The band made frequent updates on social media depicting the members tracking multiple instruments in studio. On 10 July 2015, Tesseract's official Facebook page released a video teaser for the new album titled Polaris. They also released album art and set a release date for 18 September 2015. A full album stream was uploaded to YouTube by Kscope Music on 15 September 2015. In November 2015, the band toured in support of the new album with opening bands including The Contortionist, ERRA and Skyharbor.

On 16 September 2016, an EP titled Errai consisting of four acoustically rearranged tracks from Polaris was released.

=== Sonder and Portals (2017–2021) ===
Writing for Sonder was done throughout 2017. The band released the promo single, "Smile", on 23 June 2017. Several band members, including Acle Kahney and Amos Williams, acknowledged that the single was not a complete final mix and it would be further refined before its release on Sonder. According to Amos on Kscope's website, "We have a solid idea of where we would like to take this track on the next album, as it is in no way finished." Tesseract's fourth studio album, Sonder, was announced on 8 February 2018. The lead single, "Luminary", was also released on 8 February, and a second single, "King", was released on 16 March. The full album was released on 20 April 2018.

Dan Tompkins began to pursue a solo career during this period, releasing his first solo album Castles in 2019 and his second Ruins in 2020. Castles has a dark pop/electronic rock sound, whilst Ruins is a progressive metal re-working of Castles with a brand new song "The Gift" (a collaboration between him and Matt Heafy of Trivium).

In 2020, Tesseract performed Portals, described as a "live cinematic experience" as a ticketed online stream. Drummer Jay Postones was replaced by Mike Malyan (drummer of Monuments) for the event, since Postones chose to stay in Texas due to the necessary two-week isolation from the COVID-19 pandemic. On 27 August 2021, an audio version of Portals was released as the band's second live album.

=== Regrowth EP, War of Being and ARC_ONE: Obscura EP (2022–present) ===
In 2022, Tesseract released Regrowth, a two-song EP to raise money for the people of Ukraine. "These songs have been in the TesseracT domain for a while. We had developed them for album 5, but they just weren't the right fit for where that album has headed. Rather than have them slowly decay on a server somewhere, we felt they could do something good, no matter how small? [sic]" Tesseract also finished recording their fifth studio album, War of Being, which was released on 15 September 2023. On 12 July, the lead single and title track was released. On 16 August, the band unveiled the second single "The Grey". On 13 September, two days before the album release, the band released the third single "Legion" along with a music video. On 20 March 2026, the band released an instrumental edition of the album.

In July 2026, James Monteith said "We’re going to have new music out later this year." On 9 November 2026, the band announced across their social media platforms that they would be releasing a new EP on 5 March 2027 entitled ARC_ONE: Obscura, and that they would be also be releasing a new single "Crucible", the first of three forming this Arc, on 12 November 2026. On 12 November "Crucible" was released along with an accompanying music video, and along with the single’s release it was also announced that the band had now signed to a new label Nuclear Blast Records, for the release of their upcoming EP.

== Musical style ==
Tesseract play a specific style of progressive metal and djent that features open tunings on their guitars, polyrhythmic riffs, odd time signatures and several atmospheric layers. The band have stated that they do not compose their music with specific polyrhythms in mind, but play what they feel fits the groove. They also include a mid-range distorted guitar tone and melodic clean passages, heavily influenced by ambient music.

== Band members ==
Tesseract live at With Full Force 2019

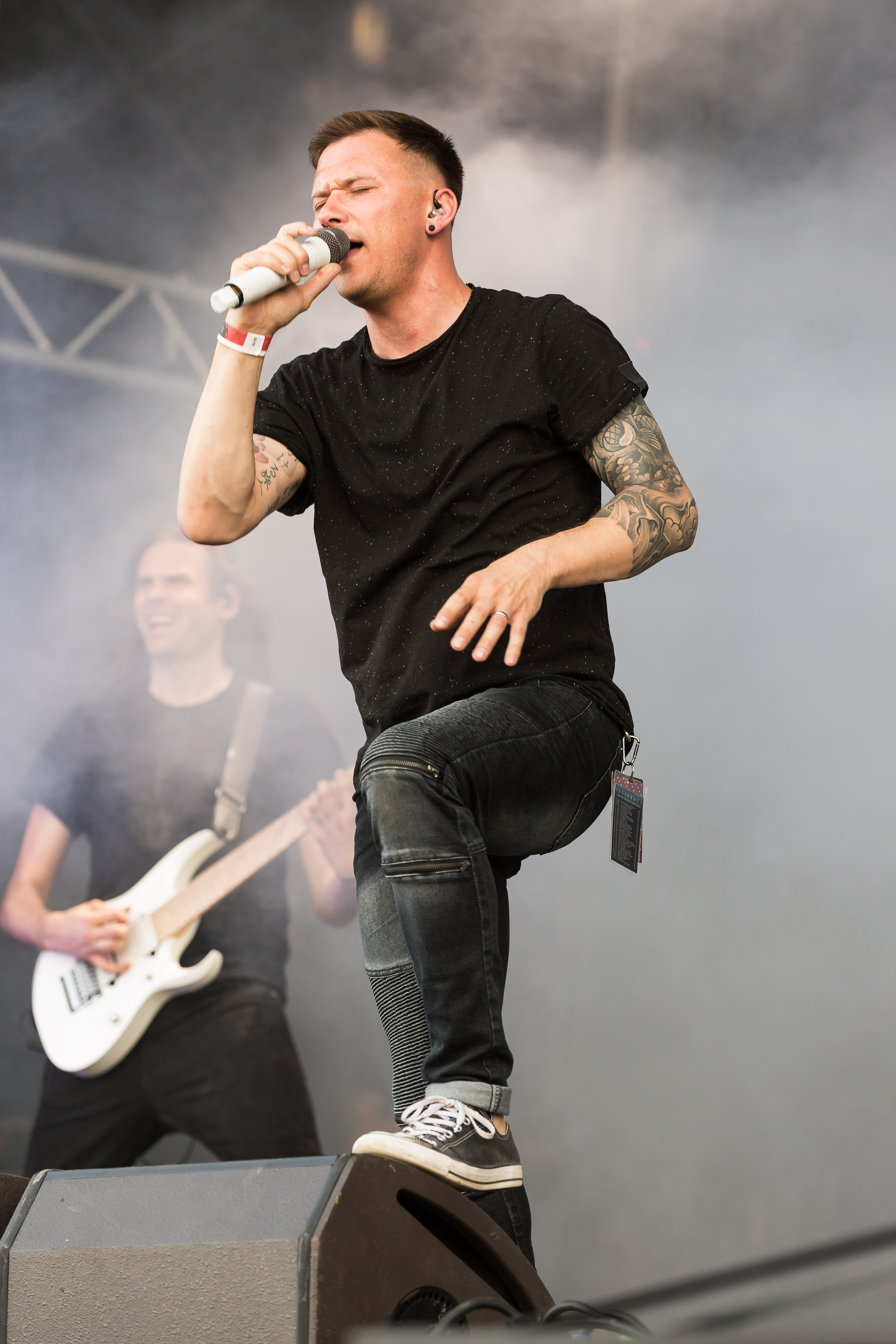
Daniel Tompkins

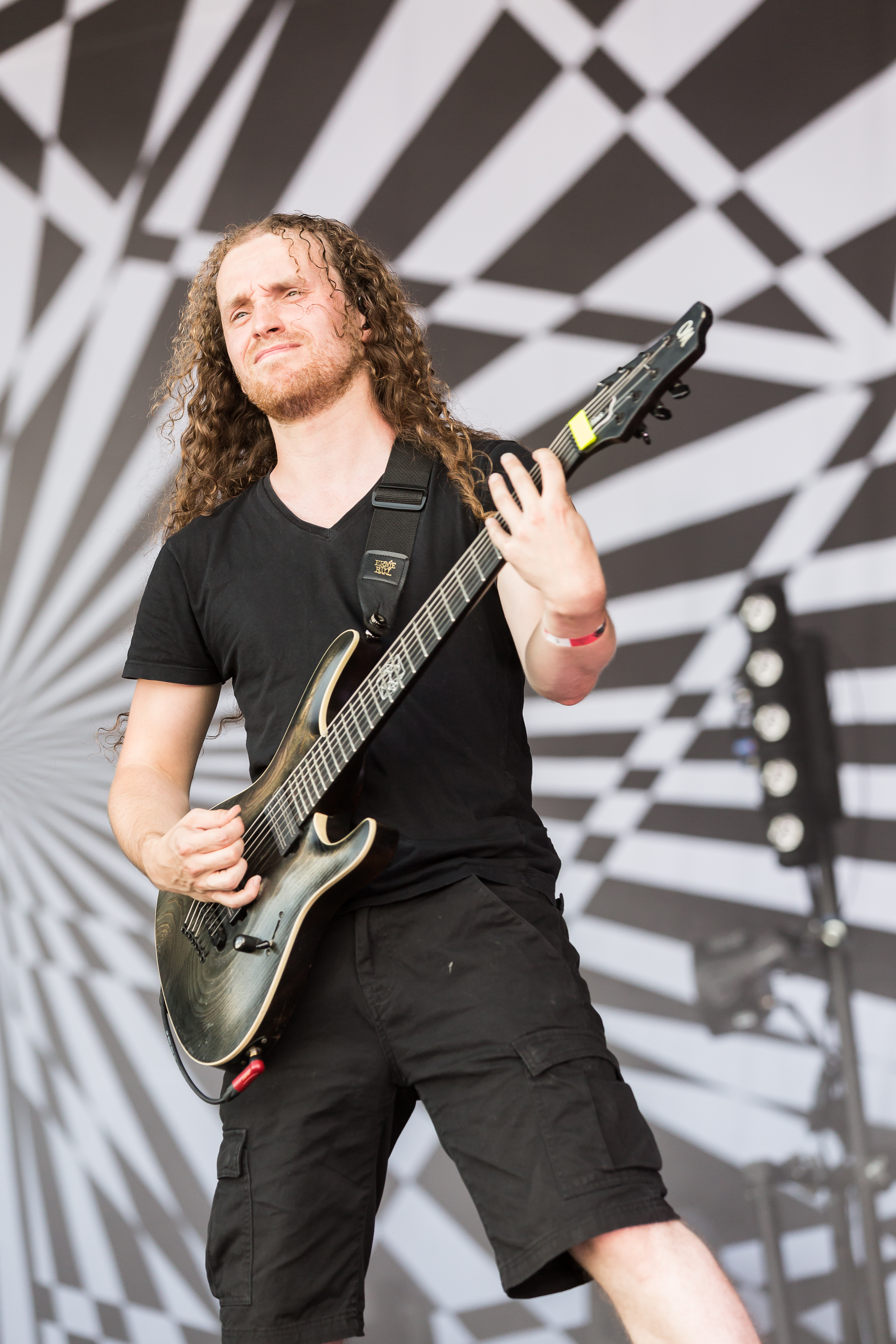
Acle Kahney

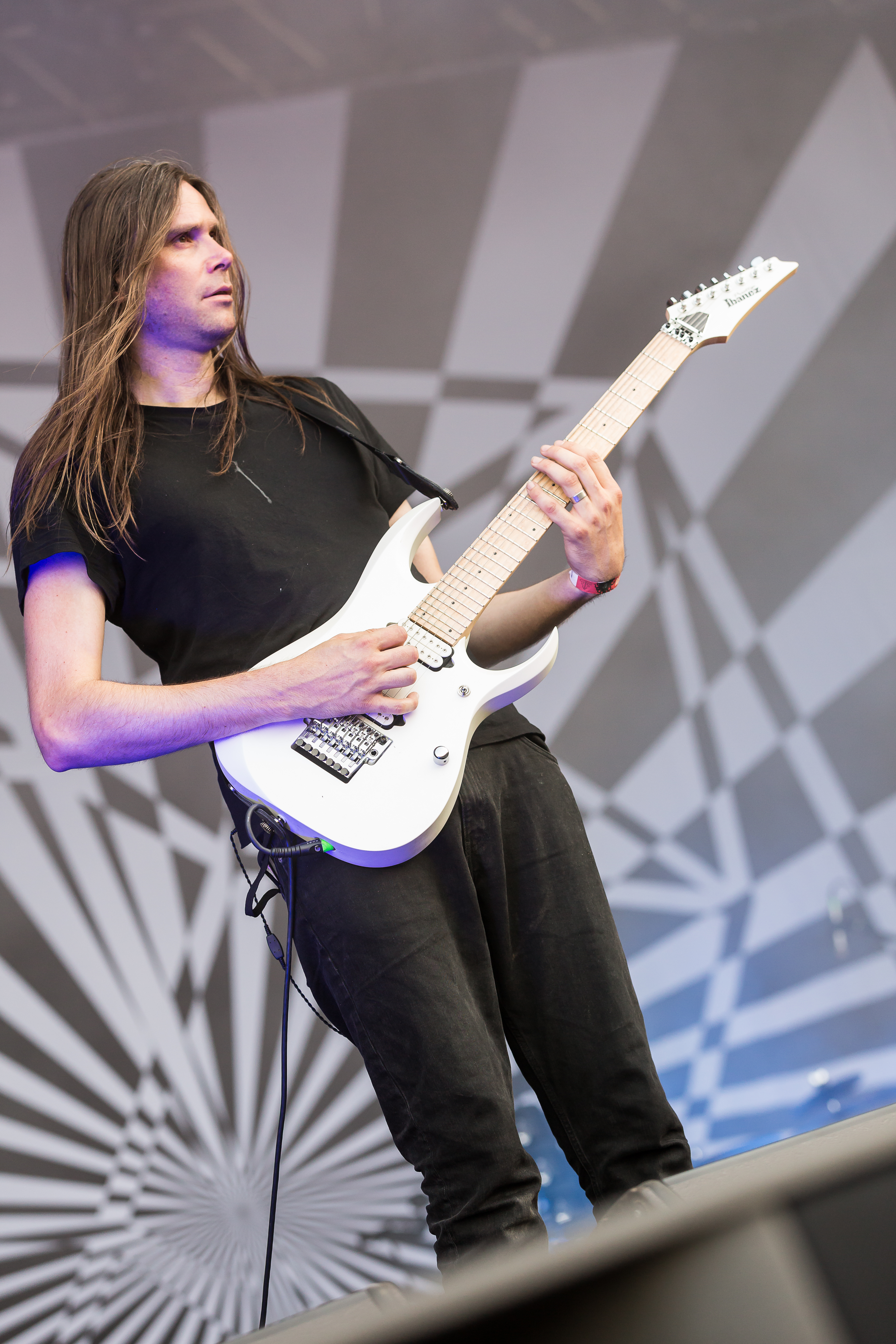
James Monteith

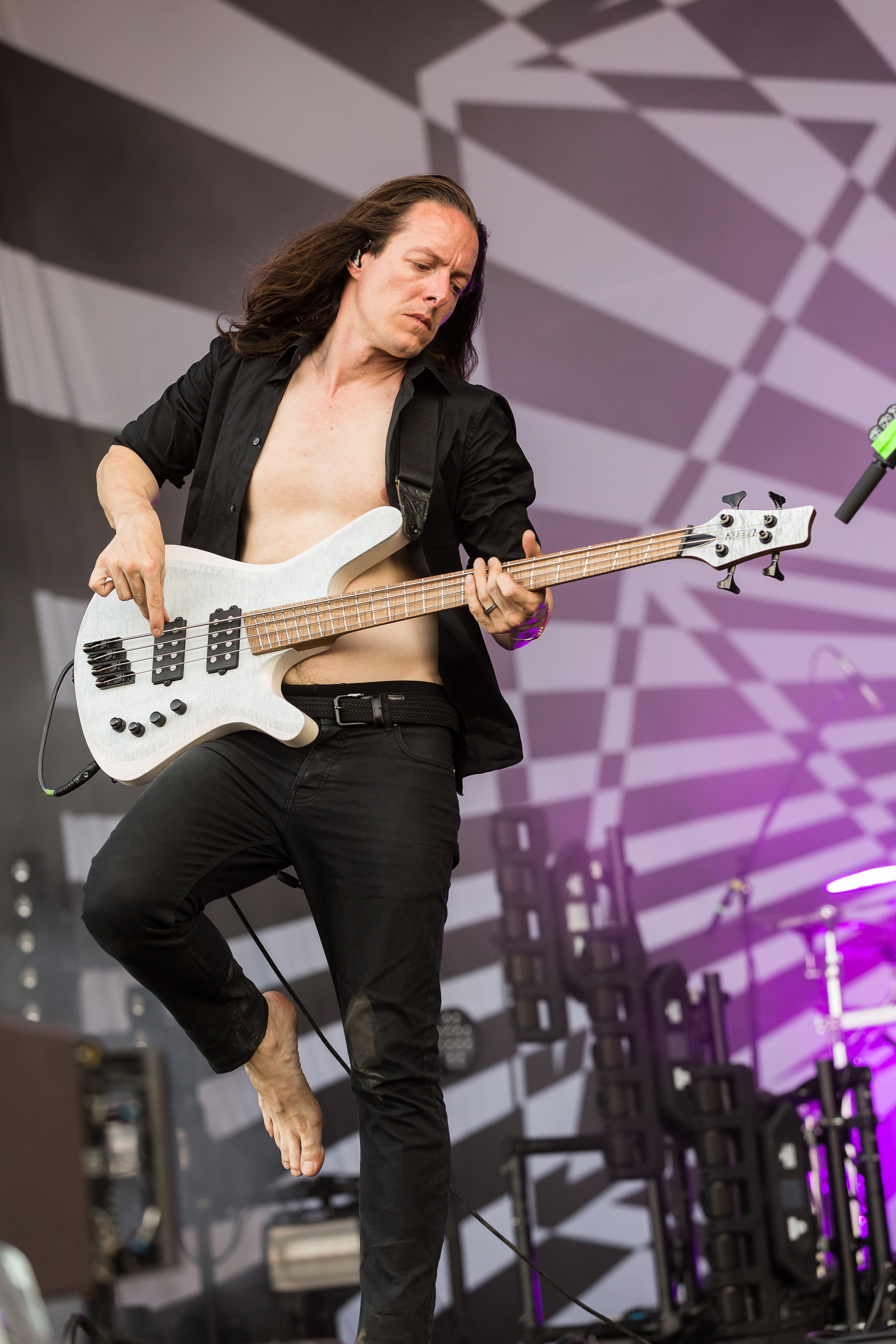
Amos Williams

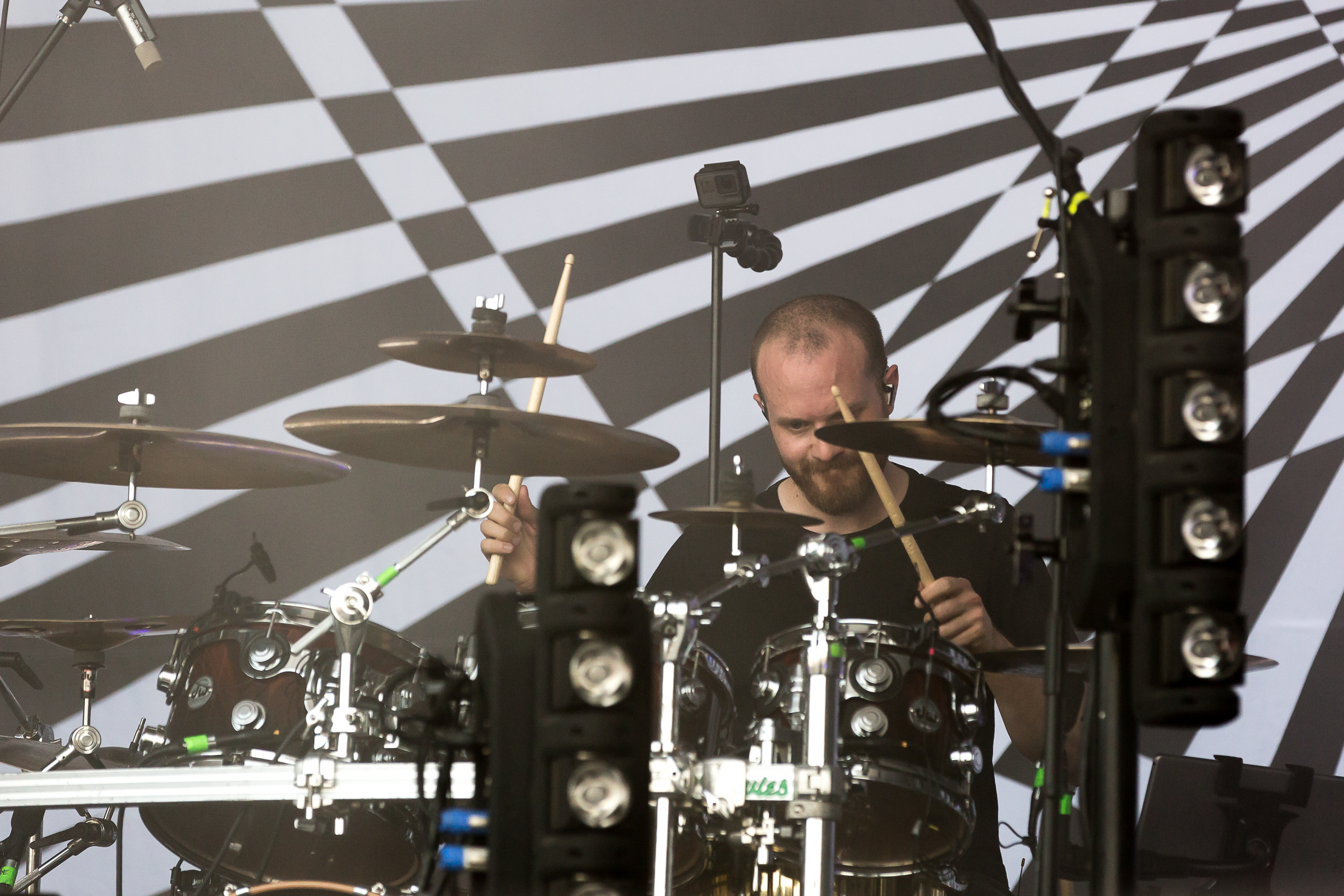
Jay Postones

Current members

- Acle Kahney – lead guitar (2003–present); rhythm guitar, bass (2003–2006)
- Jay Postones – drums, percussion (2005–present)
- Amos Williams – bass, growls, backing vocals (2006–present)
- Daniel Tompkins – lead vocals (2009–2011, 2014–present)

Session members

- Phil Vermehren – lead vocals (2003–2004)
- John Hatzioannou – lead vocals (2003–2004)
- Neema Askari – lead vocals (2003–2004)
- Lee Fisher – drums, percussion (2004–2005)
- Lisa Parish – saxophone (2004–2005)
- Mike Malyan – drums, percussion (2020)

Former members

- Julien Perier – lead vocals (2004–2006)
- Abisola Obasanya – lead vocals (2006–2009)
- Elliot Coleman – lead vocals (2011–2012)
- Ashe O'Hara – lead vocals (2012–2014)
- James 'Metal' Monteith – rhythm guitar (2006–2026)

== Discography ==
Studio albums

Title	Album details	Peak chart positions					
Title	Album details	UK	AUS	AUT	GER	SWI	US
One	Released: 22 March 2011; Label: Century Media	—	—	—	—	—	—
Altered State	Released: 27 May 2013; Label: Century Media	—	—	—	—	—	94
Polaris	Released: 18 September 2015; Label: Kscope	65	—	—	—	—	120
Sonder	Released: 20 April 2018; Label: Kscope	62	47	31	48	51	192
War of Being	Released: 15 September 2023; Label: Kscope	—	—	—	68	—	—

Extended plays

- Concealing Fate (2010)
- Perspective (2012)
- Errai (2016)
- Regrowth (2022)
- ARC_ONE: Obscura (2027)

Live albums

- Odyssey/Scala (2015)
- Portals (2021)
- RADAR (2025)

Demos

- Tesseract (2007)
- Lost Transmissions (2025)

Singles

- "Nascent" (2011)
- "Nocturne" (radio edit) (2012)
- "Messenger" (2015)
- "Survival" (2015)
- "Survival (Errai)" (2016)
- "Smile" (2017)
- "Luminary" (2018)
- "King" (2018)
- "Nocturne (P O R T A L S)" (2021)
- "Tourniquet (P O R T A L S)" (2021)
- "War of Being" (2023)
- "The Grey" (2023)
- "Legion" (2023)
- "Crucible" (2026)

== Awards and nominations ==
Year	Nominee / work	Award	Result
2011	One	Golden Gods Award for Best New Band	Nominated
2012	One	Progressive Music Award for New Blood	Won
2013	Altered State	Progressive Music Award for Album of the Year	Nominated
