= David Wilcox (Canadian musician) =

Canadian rock musician (born 1949)

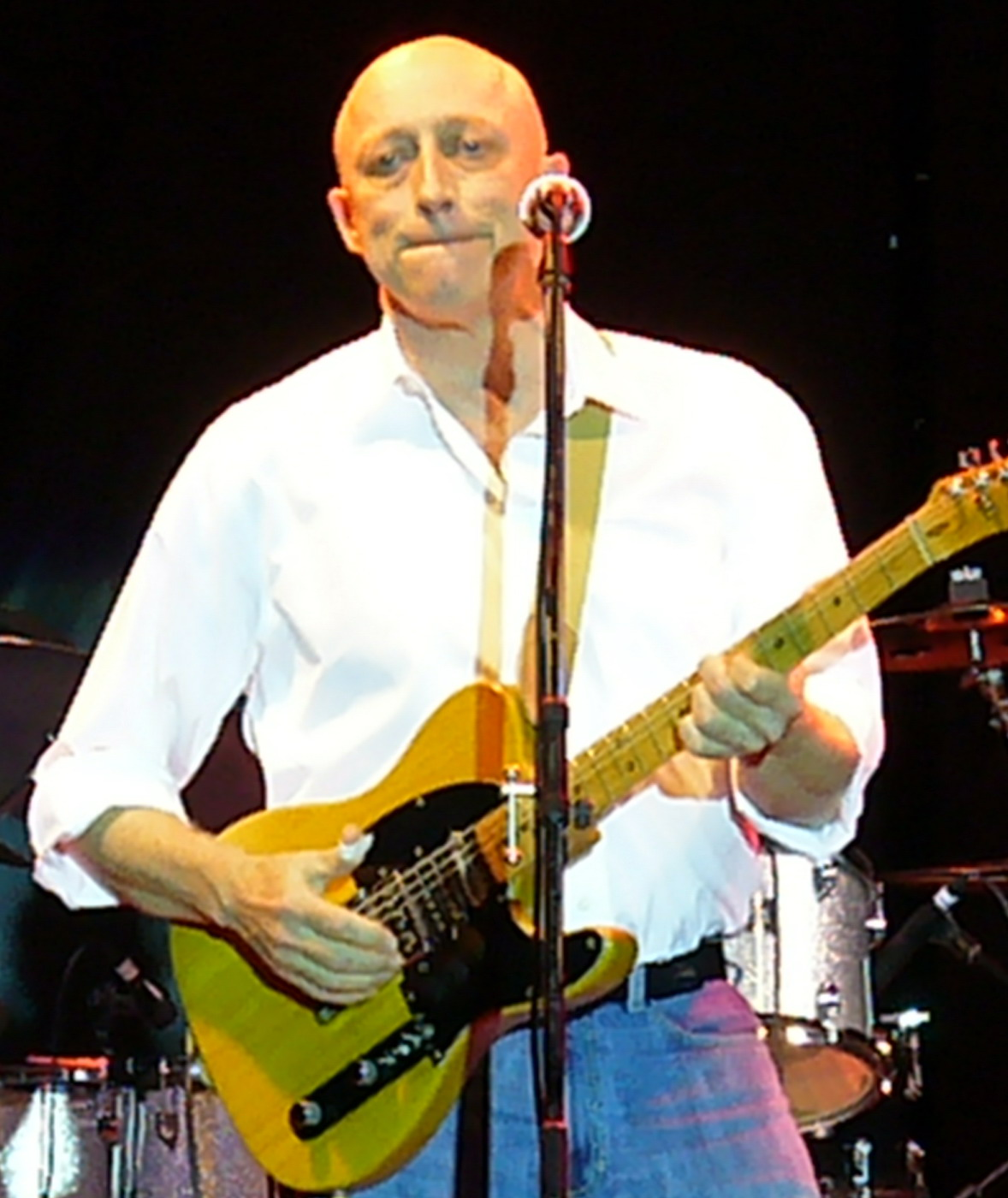
- David Wilcox in concert, at the Fergus Truck Show 2008

Background information
- Born: July 13, 1949 (age 77); Montreal, Quebec, Canada
- Genre: Blues rock
- Years active: 1970–present
- Labels: Stony Plain, Warner Music Canada, Capitol, Freedom Records Inc.
- Website: www.davidwilcox.net

David Karl William Wilcox (born July 13, 1949) is a Canadian rock musician.

== Early life ==
Born in Montreal, Wilcox drew inspiration from musician Elvis Presley at the age of six. Wilcox grew up primarily in Montreal and Toronto. Wilcox began playing guitar at the age of seven, having his first live performance (to a room of ex-convicts) at twelve years old. Wilcox dropped out of high school.

== Career ==
In 1970, Wilcox replaced Amos Garrett in Ian and Sylvia Tyson’s band, Great Speckled Bird, playing backup for acts such as Anne Murray, Carl Perkins, and Charlie Rich. Wilcox also played backup for Maria Muldaur, Todd Rundgren, Paul Butterfield and John Paul Jones before beginning his solo career. In 1973, after two records, Wilcox left Great Speckled Bird.

David first played with the Rhythm Rockets, a band that featured Dennis Stillwell Martin on vocals, harmonica and guitar. After several successful years with the Rhythm Rockets, David Wilcox hit local stages in the Teddy Bears as a flashy character with an oversized waxed moustache, a baggy suit and a flower in his lapel.

David Wilcox's debut album, a solo album called Out of the Woods, was released in 1977. Out of the Woods produced three hits; "Do the Bearcat", "Bad Apple", and "That Hypnotizin' Boogie". Wilcox signed with Capitol Records in 1982, re-releasing Out of the Woods, which became Wilcox's first album to reach gold status.

Wilcox's second album, My Eyes Keep Me in Trouble, released in 1983, featured "Downtown Came Uptown" and "Riverboat Fantasy". It was his second straight gold record and another series of tours followed.

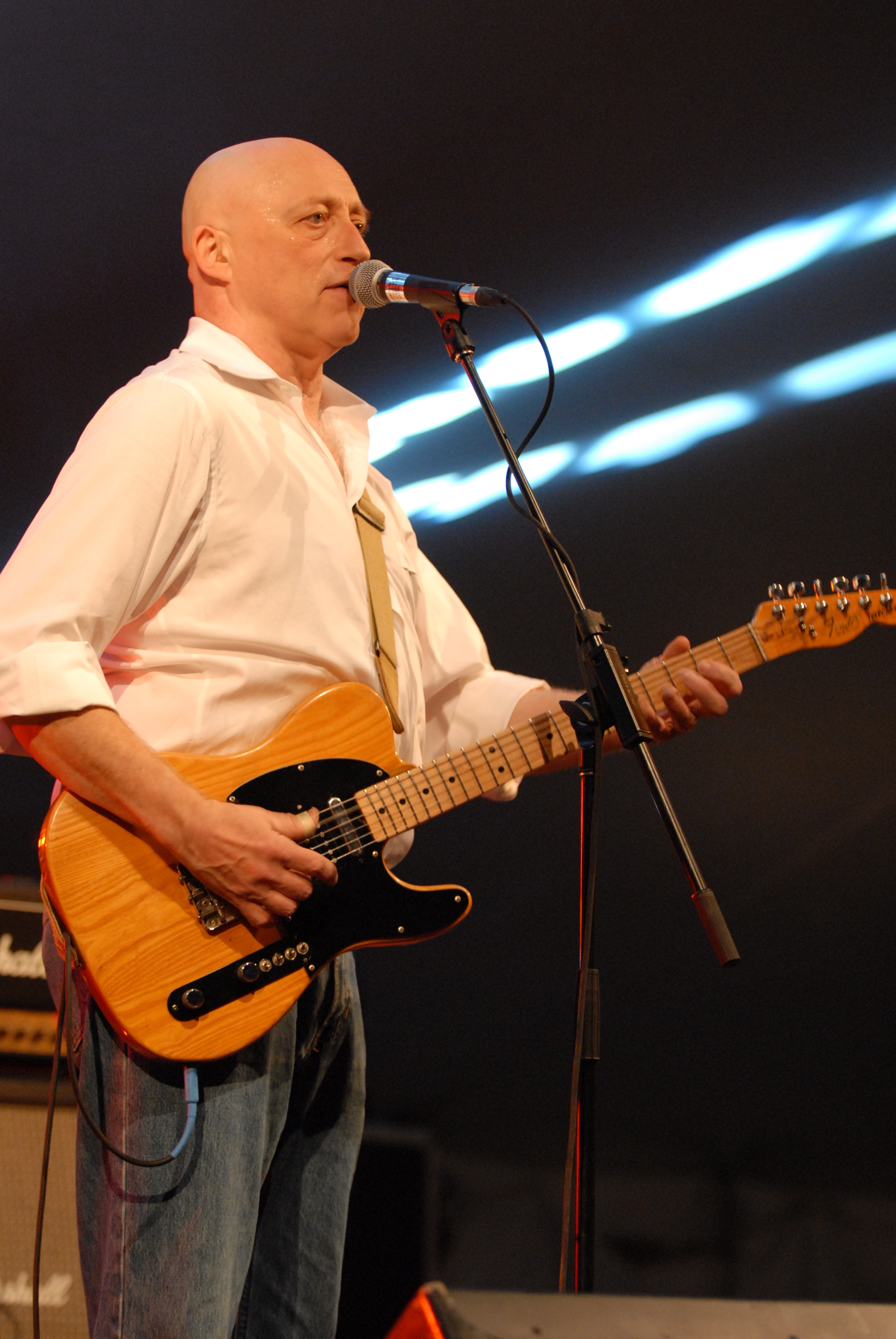
Wilcox at a concert in Spencerville, Ontario in 2006

Motivated by the success of his tour and two gold records, Wilcox went back into the studio in 1984 to record Bad Reputation. A year later he released The Best of David Wilcox, his first compilation album, as a hit-inspired collection of his songs. It was also the debut album for "Blood Money" and "When You Mistreat Her".

Later that year, Wilcox was honoured with the COCA (the Canadian Organization of Campus Activities) for Entertainer of the Year award (1985) (Biography, 2007).

Wilcox's next album to be released was yet another compilation of previously recorded successes and was part of Capitol Records' series Over 60 Minutes with...

In the late 1980s, Wilcox moved away from his past raw live-in-the-studio approach, to a more produced synthesizer and drum program modern rock sound. The album Breakfast at the Circus (1987) featured "Layin' Pipe", "The Song He Never Wrote", sounding like a Wilcox tribute to his excessive side. After more tours, he returned with 1989's The Natural Edge. It featured the title track, "The Natural Edge", the sweet anthemic pop of "Lay Down in Your Arms", "Ivory Tower", "Pop Out World", and the leadoff track "Still Life".

In 1993, Wilcox released his next album, a box set titled, The Collected Works 1977–1993. It featured live versions of "That Hypnotizin' Boogie" and "Trip Out Tonight". It also featured unreleased material such as "Needle in a Haystack" and "The Groove".

Thirteen Songs, released in 1996, featured acoustic-based music played with a small band. The album, recorded at Metalworks Studios in Mississauga, Ontario, features sax-and-organ jazz ("Rainy Night Saloon"), country storytelling ("Shotgun City") and deep blues ("Three Past Midnight"). Wilcox released Greatest Hits Too in 1997, with much of the album being produced by Wilcox.

Colin Linden produced the album Rhythm of Love which was released on Stony Plain Records. It featured "Play That Guitar Rag", "Easy Like Rain" and "Rattlesnakin' Daddy". In 2003, Wilcox released Rockin' the Boogie: The Best of Blues and Boogie, featuring much of his best-known work. In 2007, Wilcox released Boy in the Boat.

In 2013, Wilcox was featured with James Burton, Albert Lee and Amos Garrett in a concert which was later released as the live album Guitar Heroes on Stony Plain. That summer he also performed at the TD Kitchener Blues Festival.

== Discography ==
=== With Great Speckled Bird ===
- You Were on My Mind (1972)
- Ol' Eon (1973)

=== Solo ===
Album chart positions from RPM magazine (Canada):

- Out of the Woods (1977) #21 (on 1982 reissue)
- My Eyes Keep Me in Trouble (1983) #40
- Bad Reputation (1984) #63
- Breakfast at the Circus (1987) #29
- The Natural Edge (1989) #59
- Thirteen Songs (1996)
- Rhythm of Love (2000)
- Boy in the Boat (2007)
- Guitar Heroes (2015)

=== Compilations ===
- The Best of David Wilcox (1985) #90
- Over 60 Minutes With ... David Wilcox (1987)
- The Collected Works 1977–1993 (1993)
- Greatest Hits Too (1997)
- Rockin’ The Boogie: The Best of Blues and Boogie (2003)

=== Compilation inclusions ===
- Saturday Night Blues: 20 Years (2006) CBC

=== Singles ===
Title	Year	Peak chart positions		Album
Title	Year	CAN	CAN AC	Album
"Bad Apple"	1982	—	—	Out of the Woods
"Bump Up Ahead"	1982	—	28	Out of the Woods
"Hot Hot Papa"	1982	—	—	Out of the Woods
"When You Mistreat Her"	1983	—	—	Single only
"Downtown Came Uptown"	1983	—	—	My Eyes Keep Me in Trouble
"The Grind"	1984	—	—	Bad Reputation
"Blood Money"	1985	—	—	The Best of David Wilcox
"Breakfast at the Circus"	1987	84	—	Breakfast at the Circus
"Layin' Pipe"	1987	62	—	Breakfast at the Circus
"Between the Lines"	1988	45	—	Breakfast at the Circus
"The Natural Edge"	1989	58	—	The Natural Edge
"Our Town"	1989	—	—	The Natural Edge
"Bless the World"	1993	54	—	The Collected Works 1977–1993
"Ecstasy"	1993	—	—	The Collected Works 1977–1993
"—" denotes a recording that did not chart or was not released in that territory.
