= The Alarm discography =

Catalogue of published recordings by the Alarm

- Studio albums: 21
- EPs: 8
- Soundtrack albums: 2
- Live albums: 29
- Compilation albums: 8
- Singles: 35
- Video albums: 10
- Box sets: 5
- Other albums: 23

This is the discography of Welsh rock band the Alarm.

The band released 5 studio albums in their initial 10 year run, and then released 16 more in a second run starting as the Alarm MM++ from 2002 to 2025 when Mike Peters died.

== Albums ==
=== Studio albums ===
Title	Album details	Peak chart positions									Certifications
Title	Album details	UK	UK Indie	CAN	NL	NOR	NZ	SWE	US	US Indie	Certifications
Declaration	Released: 13 February 1984; Label: I.R.S.; Formats: CD, LP, MC	6	—	35	—	14	38	22	50	—	UK: Silver
Strength	Released: October 1985; Label: I.R.S.; Formats: CD, LP, MC	18	—	66	74	12	—	19	39	—	UK: Silver
Eye of the Hurricane	Released: 19 October 1987; Label: I.R.S.; Formats: CD, LP, MC	23	—	34	—	—	—	—	77	—	UK: Silver
Change	Released: September 1989; Label: I.R.S.; Formats: CD, LP, MC	13	—	26	—	—	—	—	75	—	UK: Silver
Raw	Released: April 1991; Label: I.R.S.; Formats: CD, LP, MC	33	—	59	—	—	—	—	161	—	
Close (Note: Part of the "In the Poppyfields" bond, exclusively available via the Alarm's website, in which one album was released every month for four months. A bonus fifth album, Edward Henry Street, was given away to those who bought the bond in advance.)	Released: 21 September 2002; Label: The Twenty First Century Recording Company; Formats: CD	—	—	—	—	—	—	—	—	—	
The Normal Rules Do Not Apply	Released: 26 October 2002; Label: The Twenty First Century Recording Company; Formats: CD	—	—	—	—	—	—	—	—	—	
Trafficking	Released: 10 December 2003; Label: The Twenty First Century Recording Company; Formats: CD	—	—	—	—	—	—	—	—	—	
Edward Henry Street	Released: 10 December 2003; Label: The Twenty First Century Recording Company; Formats: CD	—	—	—	—	—	—	—	—	—	
Coming Home	Released: 20 January 2004; Label: The Twenty First Century Recording Company; Formats: CD	—	—	—	—	—	—	—	—	—	
In the Poppy Fields (Note: Released as the Alarm MMIV.)	Released: 19 April 2004; Label: Snapper Music; Formats: CD	107	9	—	—	—	—	—	—	—	
Under Attack (Note: Released as the Alarm MMVI.)	Released: 20 February 2006; Label: Liberty EMI; Formats: CD, CD+DVD	138	—	—	—	—	—	—	—	—	
Guerilla Tactics (Note: Released as the Alarm MMVIII.)	Released: 7 July 2008; Label: The Twenty First Century Recording Company; Formats: CD+DVD, digital download	—	—	—	—	—	—	—	—	—	
Direct Action (Note: Released as the Alarm MMX.)	Released: 12 April 2010; Label: The Twenty First Century Recording Company; Formats: CD+DVD, digital download	—	—	—	—	—	—	—	—	—	
Blood Red (Note: Released as Mike Peters & the Alarm.)	Released: 5 May 2017; Label: The Twenty First Century Recording Company; Formats: CD, LP, digital download	—	—	—	—	—	—	—	—	—	
Viral Black	Released: 22 September 2017; Label: The Twenty First Century Recording Company; Formats: CD, LP, digital download	—	—	—	—	—	—	—	—	—	
Equals	Released: 29 June 2018; Label: The Twenty First Century Recording Company; Formats: CD, LP, digital download	72	6	—	—	—	—	—	—	46	
Sigma	Released: 28 June 2019; Label: The Twenty First Century Recording Company; Formats: CD, LP, digital download	—	10	—	—	—	—	—	—	—	
WAЯ	Released: 25 February 2021; Label: The Twenty First Century Recording Company; Formats: CD, LP, digital download	—	—	—	—	—	—	—	—	—	
"—" denotes releases that did not chart or were not released in that territory.

=== Live albums ===
Title	Album details	Peak chart positions	
Title	Album details	UK	US
Electric Folklore Live	Released: November 1988; Label: I.R.S.; Formats: CD, LP, MC	62	167
Live on the King Biscuit Flower Hour	Released: 1999; Label: King Biscuit Flower Hour; Formats: CD	—	—
Shepherds Bush Empire London 15.12.2000	Released: 2000; Label: The Twenty First Century Recording Company; Formats: 2xCD; Limited release	—	—
Greatest Hits Live	Released: 2001; Label: Beyond; Formats: CD	—	—
The Garage Glasgow 4.12.2000	Released: 2001; Label: The Twenty First Century Recording Company; Formats: 2xCD; Limited release	—	—
Live at Hammersmith Palais 1984	Released: 15 January 2003; Label: The Twenty First Century Recording Company; Formats: CD	—	—
The Garage Glasgow 01.02.2003 (Note: Released as the Alarm MMIII.)	Released: 17 July 2003; Label: The Twenty First Century Recording Company; Formats: CD	—	—
Masque Theatre Liverpool 06.02.2003	Released: 17 July 2003; Label: The Twenty First Century Recording Company; Formats: CD	—	—
London Mean Fiddler 07.02.03	Released: 17 July 2003; Label: The Twenty First Century Recording Company; Formats: CD	—	—
The Alarm MMIII in Session	Released: 2004; Label: Snapper Music; Formats: CD	—	—
Wolverhampton Wulfrun Hall 7th February 2004	Released: 22 September 2004; Label: Snapper Music; Formats: CD; Limited release	—	—
Liverpool Academy 8th February 2004	Released: 22 September 2004; Label: Snapper Music; Formats: CD; Limited release	—	—
Pontypridd Muni Arts Centre 26th February 2004	Released: 22 September 2004; Label: Snapper Music; Formats: CD; Limited release	—	—
The Garage Glasgow 7th March 2004	Released: 22 September 2004; Label: Snapper Music; Formats: CD; Limited release	—	—
Live in the Poppy Fields	Released: 27 September 2004; Label: Snapper Music; Formats: CD+DVD	—	—
The Saturday Gigs	Released: 1 December 2006; Label: The Twenty First Century Recording Company; Formats: CD	—	—
Spirit of '86	Released: 23 November 2007; Label: The Twenty First Century Recording Company; Formats: CD+DVD	—	—
The Gathering Live 2011	Released: 2011; Label: The Twenty First Century Recording Company; Formats: 2xCD+2xDVD	—	—
The Music Must and Shall Be Preserved – The Gathering Live 2012	Released: 2012; Label: The Twenty First Century Recording Company; Formats: 2xCD+2xDVD	—	—
Abide With Us – The Gathering 2013	Released: 2013; Label: The Twenty First Century Recording Company; Formats: 2xCD	—	—
No Barriers – The Gathering 2014	Released: December 2014; Label: The Twenty First Century Recording Company; Formats: 2xCD+2xDVD	—	—
Hands Held High – Live at the Gathering 2015	Released: December 2015; Label: The Twenty First Century Recording Company; Formats: CD+3xDVD	—	—
Declaration – Live at the Deaf Institute	Released: 7 December 2015; Label: The Twenty First Century Recording Company; Formats: CD+DVD	—	—
Strength – Live at the Globe 2015	Released: 7 December 2015; Label: The Twenty First Century Recording Company; Formats: CD+DVD	—	—
In Session 2016	Released: 2016; Label: The Twenty First Century Recording Company; Formats: CD	—	—
'Orchestrated' – Live at Wales Millennium Centre	Released: October 2016; Label: The Twenty First Century Recording Company; Formats: 2xLP	—	—
Strength Live '85	Released: 13 April 2019; Label: The Twenty First Century Recording Company; Formats: 2xLP, digital download	—	—
Celtic Folklore Live	Released: 18 April 2020; Label: The Twenty First Century Recording Company; Formats: LP; Limited release	—	—
Music Will Keep Us Strong	Released: 10 September 2020; Label: The Twenty First Century Recording Company; Formats: 4xCD	—	—
"—" denotes releases that did not chart or were not released in that territory.

=== Soundtrack albums ===
Title	Album details
Vinyl – Free Rock and Roll	Released: 15 March 2013; Label: The Twenty First Century Recording Company; Formats: CD, digital download; Soundtrack to the film Vinyl
Man in the Camo Jacket... A Story of Love Hope Strength	Released: 22 April 2017; Label: The Twenty First Century Recording Company; Formats: LP, digital download; Soundtrack to the Mike Peters documentary film

=== Compilation albums ===
Title	Album details	Peak chart positions			Certifications
Title	Album details	UK	CAN	US	Certifications
Standards	Released: 12 November 1990; Label: I.R.S.; Formats: CD, LP, MC	47	78	177	UK: Silver
The Best of the Alarm and Mike Peters	Released: 13 April 1998; Label: EMI; Formats: CD	—	—	—	
Eponymous 1981–1983	Released: 2000; Label: The Twenty First Century Recording Company; Formats: CD	—	—	—	
The Collection	Released: 5 November 2007; Label: EMI; Formats: CD	—	—	—	
BBC Radio Sessions 1983–1991	Released: 14 November 2008; Label: BBC; Formats: CD	—	—	—	
21	Released: 2 November 2009; Label: The Twenty First Century Recording Company; Formats: CD, digital download; Contains re-recordings and remixes	—	—	—	
Best of Live	Released: 18 November 2018; Label: Secret; Formats: LP	—	—	—	
History Repeating 1981–2021	Released: 4 June 2021; Label: The Twenty First Century Recording Company; Formats: CD, 2xLP, digital download	—	—	—	
"—" denotes releases that did not chart or were not released in that territory.

=== Box sets ===
Title	Album details
The Alarm 2000 Collection	Released: August 2000; Label: The Twenty First Century Recording Company; Formats: 8xCD
The Sound & the Fury – Live 1981 to 1991	Released: 20 October 2003; Label: Shakedown; Formats: 2xCD+DVD
The Gathering Collection	Released: January 2005; Label: The Twenty First Century Recording Company; Formats: 8xDVD
Counter Attack	Released: 2008; Label: The Twenty First Century Recording Company; Formats: 8xCD
Poppies Falling from the Sky	Released: 10 October 2016; Label: The Twenty First Century Recording Company; Formats: 2xCD+DVD

=== Video albums ===
Title	Album details
Spirit of '86	Released: 1986; Label: Hendring; Formats: VHS, Beta
Change. E.P.	Released: 1990; Label: Picture Music International; Formats: VHS
Standards	Released: November 1990; Label: I.R.S.; Formats: VHS
Blaze Of Glory – Live in Concert from the Brixton Academy	Released: 1991; Label: The Video Collection; Formats: CD
Greatest Hits Live	Released: 10 June 2002; Label: The Twenty First Century Recording Company; Formats: DVD
VH-1 Bands Reunited Uncut	Released: 2003; Label: The Twenty First Century Recording Company; Formats: 3xDVD
The Story of the Alarm	Released: 30 November 2002; Label: The Twenty First Century Recording Company; Formats: 2xDVD
Rock and Roll Circus – Live at the Marquee Club, London, England	Released: 28 June 2006; Label: The Twenty First Century Recording Company; Formats: DVD
The Alarm MMVII Live from the Gathering 2007	Released: 23 November 2007; Label: The Twenty First Century Recording Company; Formats: DVD
Tactical Response from the Gathering 2008	Released: 14 November 2008; Label: The Twenty First Century Recording Company; Formats: DVD

=== Other albums ===
Title	Album details
Newid	Released: 1989; Label: I.R.S.; Formats: CD, LP; Welsh-language version of Change
Tân	Released: 1991; Label: Crai; Formats: CD, MC; Welsh-language version of Raw
Declaration 1984–1985	Released: 2000; Label: The Twenty First Century Recording Company; Formats: CD; Expanded reissue of Declaration
Strength 1985–1986	Released: 2000; Label: The Twenty First Century Recording Company; Formats: CD; Expanded reissue of Strength
Eye of the Hurricane 1987–1988	Released: 2000; Label: The Twenty First Century Recording Company; Formats: CD; Expanded reissue of Eye of the Hurricane
Electric Folklore Live 1987–1988	Released: 2000; Label: The Twenty First Century Recording Company; Formats: CD; Expanded reissue of Electric Folklore Live
Change 1989–1990	Released: 2000; Label: The Twenty First Century Recording Company; Formats: CD; Expanded reissue of Change
Raw 1990–1991	Released: 2000; Label: The Twenty First Century Recording Company; Formats: CD; Expanded reissue of Raw
Three Sevens Clash (Note: Part of Counter Attack Collective, released as the Alarm MMVII and the Alarm MMVIII.)	Released: 7 July 2007; Label: The Twenty First Century Recording Company; Formats: CD
Fightback	Released: 2 August 2007; Label: The Twenty First Century Recording Company; Formats: CD
This Is Not a Test	Released: 10 September 2007; Label: The Twenty First Century Recording Company; Formats: CD
Situation Under Control	Released: 3 October 2007; Label: The Twenty First Century Recording Company; Formats: CD
Call to Action	Released: 9 November 2007; Label: The Twenty First Century Recording Company; Formats: CD
1983/84 Revisited	Released: 1 December 2007; Label: The Twenty First Century Recording Company; Formats: CD
Counter Attack	Released: 12 February 2008; Label: The Twenty First Century Recording Company; Formats: CD
The Sound and the Fury	Released: 6 June 2011; Label: The Twenty First Century Recording Company; Formats: CD+DVD digital download; Contains re-recordings of previously released songs
Declaration [30th Anniversary]	Released: 13 February 2014; Label: The Twenty First Century Recording Company; Formats: CD, LP; Re-recording of album
Peace Train	Released: 2014; Label: The Twenty First Century Recording Company; Formats: CD; Companion to the re-recorded Declaration album
Strength [30th Anniversary]	Released: 25 February 2015; Label: The Twenty First Century Recording Company; Formats: CD, LP; Re-recording of album
Majority	Released: 16 March 2015; Label: The Twenty First Century Recording Company; Formats: CD; Companion to the re-recorded Strength album
Eye of the Hurricane [2019 Edition]	Released: October 2019; Label: The Twenty First Century Recording Company; Formats: LP; Re-recording of album
Change [2019 Edition]	Released: October 2019; Label: The Twenty First Century Recording Company; Formats: LP; Re-recording of album
Sun Studio Sessions 2019	Released: December 2019; Label: The Twenty First Century Recording Company; Formats: CD

== EPs ==
Title	Album details	Peak chart positions
Title	Album details	US
The Alarm	Released: 15 June 1983; Label: I.R.S.; Formats: 12", MC	126
Spirit of '76	Released: 1985; Label: I.R.S.; Formats: LP; Mini-album	—
Compact Hits	Released: May 1988; Label: A&M; Formats: CD	—
Save It for Later	Released: 1988; Label: I.R.S.; Formats: CD	—
Unbreak the Promise	Released: 20 June 2011; Label: The Twenty First Century Recording Company; Formats: CD, digital download	—
Where the Two Rivers Meet	Released: 21 April 2018; Label: The Twenty First Century Recording Company; Formats: 12"; Limited release	—
The Red Wall of Cymru	Released: 28 May 2021; Label: The Twenty First Century Recording Company; Formats: CD, digital download	—
Spirit of '58 EP	Released: 12 June 2021; Label: The Twenty First Century Recording Company; Formats: 7"; Limited release	—
"—" denotes releases that did not chart or were not released in that territory.

== Singles ==
Title	Year	Peak chart positions								Albums
Title	Year	UK	UK Indie	CAN	IRE	NZ	US	US Alt	US Main	Albums
"Unsafe Building"	1981	—	—	—	—	—	—	—	—	Non-album single
"Marching On"	1982	—	—	—	—	—	—	—	—	Declaration
"The Stand"	1983	86	—	—	—	—	—	—	—	Declaration
"Sixty Eight Guns"	1983	17	—	—	16	—	106	—	39	Declaration
"Where Were You Hiding When the Storm Broke?"	1984	22	—	—	—	—	—	—	—	Declaration
"The Deceiver"	1984	51	—	—	—	—	104	—	—	Declaration
"The Chant Has Just Begun"	1984	48	—	—	—	—	—	—	—	Non-album single
"Absolute Reality"	1985	35	—	—	—	—	—	—	—	Strength
"Strength"	1985	40	—	—	—	—	61	—	12	Strength
"Spirit of '76"	1986	22	—	—	23	—	—	—	29	Strength
"Knife Edge"	1986	43	—	—	—	—	—	—	—	Strength
"Rain in the Summertime"	1987	18	—	44	30	48	71	—	6	Eye of the Hurricane
"Rescue Me"	1987	48	—	—	—	—	—	—	34	Eye of the Hurricane
"Presence of Love"	1988	44	—	—	—	—	77	—	16	Eye of the Hurricane
"Sold Me Down the River"	1989	43	—	19	—	—	50	3	2	Change
"A New South Wales" (Note: Features the Morriston Orpheus Male Voice Choir.)	1989	31	—	—	—	—	—	—	—	Change
"Hwylio Dros y Mor" (Note: Welsh-language version of "A New South Wales".)	1989	—	—	—	—	—	—	—	—	Newid
"Devolution Workin' Man Blues"	1989	—	—	88	—	—	—	11	9	Change
"Love Don't Come Easy"	1990	48	—	55	—	—	—	—	33	Change
"Unsafe Building 1990"	1990	54	—	—	—	—	—	—	—	Standards
"Happy Christmas (War Is Over)" (Note: Only released as a single in Japan and as a promo-only single in the US.)	1990	—	—	—	—	—	—	—	—	Standards
"The Road"	1991	—	—	64	—	—	—	7	16	Standards
"Raw"	1991	51	—	54	—	—	—	15	29	Raw
"45 R.P.M." (Note: Released as the Poppy Fields.)	2004	28	6	—	—	—	—	—	—	In the Poppy Fields
"New Home New Life"	2004	45	—	—	—	—	—	—	—	In the Poppy Fields
"Close"	2004	—	—	—	—	—	—	—	—	In the Poppy Fields
"Superchannel"	2006	24	—	—	—	—	—	—	—	Under Attack
"Raindown"	2006	—	—	—	—	—	—	—	—	Under Attack
"Free Rock and Roll"	2013	—	—	—	—	—	—	—	—	Vinyl – Free Rock and Roll
"In the Poppy Fields"	2016	—	—	—	—	—	—	—	—	Poppies Falling from the Sky
"There Must Be a Way"	2017	—	—	—	—	—	—	—	—	Blood Red
"Heroine"	2017	—	—	—	—	—	—	—	—	Viral Black
"Beautiful"	2018	—	—	—	—	—	—	—	—	Equals
"Two Rivers"	2018	—	—	—	—	—	—	—	—	Equals
"Time to Start Over!"	2021	—	—	—	—	—	—	—	—	Non-album single
"—" denotes releases that did not chart or were not released in that territory.
