= The Alarm (EP) =

EP by The Alarm
- Released: June 1983
- Recorded: 1982–1983
- Genre: Rock, new wave
- Length: 16:48
- Label: IRS
- Producer: Paul De Villiers

The Alarm chronology
The Alarm (1983)	Declaration (1984)

Professional ratings
Review scores
Source	Rating
Allmusic	3.5/5 stars

The Alarm is a studio EP by The Alarm. It was released in 1983 by IRS Records, initially on 12 inch vinyl and cassette. The cassette was released in the UK with the "68 Guns" single. A re-mastered version was released with bonus tracks in 2000.

The Alarm was the band's first album release, though two excerpted singles, "Marching On" and "The Stand", were both released before the EP. "For Freedom" was recorded live at The Marquee, Wardour Street, London W.1. on 30 January 1983.

== Track listing ==
All songs written by Eddie MacDonald and Mike Peters, except where noted.

1. "The Stand" (McDonald, Peters, Dave Sharp) — 3:41
2. "Across the Border" (Sharp) — 3:39
3. "Marching On" — 3:32
4. "Lie of the Land" — 2:31
5. "For Freedom (Live)" — 3:25

=== Remastered release ===
Released in 2000, the remastered edition features a revised track listing, B-sides and previously unreleased recordings, new and original artwork, photos, lyrics, sleeve notes by Mike Peters and interactive programming information to play the EP in its original form.

1. "Unsafe Building"
2. "Up For Murder"
3. "Lie of the Land (demo)"
4. "Reason 41 (demo)"
5. "The Deceiver (demo)"
6. "What Kind of Hell (demo)"
7. "Sixty-Eight Guns (demo)"
8. "Marching On"
9. "Lie of the Land"
10. "Across the Border"
11. "The Stand"
12. "Blaze of Glory (long version)"
13. "Thoughts of a Young Man (Part One)"
14. "For Freedom (live)"
15. "Reason 41 (live)"
16. "The Deceiver (live)"
17. "Third Light (live)"
18. "Live of the Land (live)"
19. "Legal Matter (live)" (The Who cover)
20. "Marching On (live)"
21. "The Stand (long version)"
22. "Sixty-Eight Guns (single version)"

=== 20th Anniversary Collectors' Edition ===
The 20th Anniversary Collectors Edition includes an enhanced CD-ROM with the promotional video for "The Stand", The Alarm's first interview on US TV featuring acoustic performances of "Blaze Of Glory" and "Knocking On Heaven's Door", and the original 1983 US TV advert for The Alarm EP. All tracks were remastered from the original master tapes.

1. "The Stand" - 3:41
2. "Across the Border" - 3:39
3. "Marching On"- 3:32
4. "Lie of the Land" - 2:31
5. "For Freedom [Live]" - 3:25

== Personnel ==
The Alarm

- Mike Peters - lead vocals, electric guitar, harmonica on "For Freedom" and "The Stand"
- Dave Sharp - electric guitar, backing vocals
- Eddie Macdonald - bass, backing vocals
- Twist - drums, backing vocals

Additional musicians

- Mark Feltham - harmonica on "Across the Border" and "Lie of the Land"
- Angie Knox - keyboards

Production personnel

- "Across the Border", "Marching On", and "Lie of the Land" produced by Aricentus, Steve Tannet, Harry Murlowski, and Ian Wilson
- "The Stand" and "For Freedom" produced by Mick Glossop
- Engineered by Jess Sutcliffe
- "For Freedom" recorded and mixed by Steve Tannet and Kenny McAndrews
- Photography by Harry T. Murlowski

Remastered version

- Mastered by Mike Peters
- Photography by Ed Colver
