= Sara Sugarman =

Welsh actress and filmmaker (born 1962)

- Born: 13 October 1962 (age 64); Rhyl, Wales
- Education: Royal Academy of Dramatic Art
- Occupations: Actress; filmmaker
- Years active: 1979–present
- Spouse: David Thewlis (m. 1992; div. 1994)

Sara Sugarman (born 13 October 1962) is a Welsh actress and filmmaker whose work includes Disney's Confessions of a Teenage Drama Queen (2004) and Very Annie Mary (2001). She has also appeared in films including Dealers (1989) and Those Glory Glory Days (1983).

== Biography ==
Sugarman was born in Rhyl, Denbighshire, Wales, into a Jewish family. As a young teenager, she played in a punk outfit called The Fractures, managed by local musician Mike Peters. During this period, she played the rebellious SAG (School Action Group) leader Jessica Samuels in the children's drama TV series Grange Hill (1978–1979).

In London, Sugarman attended both the Arts Educational School and then Barbara Speake Stage School in Acton. She attended the Royal Academy of Dramatic Art (RADA) from 1986 to 1989, where she won the Best Actress medal. In the 1980s, Sugarman was in a relationship with Dudley Sutton. In 1992, she married the actor David Thewlis. They divorced in 1994. She was in a relationship with Michael Byrne until his death in 2026.

In 1994 she won a place at Bournemouth Film School and scripted and directed three short films, nominated for a BAFTA, BAFTA CYMRU and won twenty three International film festivals. She won International Film maker's prize at the Sundance Film Festival and HBO film maker prize at HBO comedy festival and the Orange Prize for screenwriting.

As of 2010, Sugarman was living in Los Angeles. In 2012, Sugarman wrote and directed Vinyl, a British comedy film based on the true story of Welsh musician Mike Peters of The Alarm who in 2004 released the single "45 RPM" under the name of a fictitious band "The Poppy Fields". Much of the film was shot on location in Sugarman's hometown Rhyl.

== Selected work ==
=== Filmmaker ===
- Mad Cows (1999; director)
- Very Annie Mary (2001; writer, director)
- Confessions of a Teenage Drama Queen (2004; director)
- Vinyl (2012; writer, director)
- House of Versace (2013, director)
- Save the Cinema (2022; director)
- Midas Man (2024; uncredited American shoot, director, Joe Stephenson)

=== Film appearances ===
- Those Glory Glory Days (1983)
- Sid and Nancy (1986)
- Straight to Hell (1987)
- Dealers (1989)
- Anthrakitis (1998, short film)
- Mr Nice (2010)

=== Television appearances ===
- Grange Hill (1978–1979) as Jessica Samuels
- Juliet Bravo (1980)
- Busted (1983, TV movie)
- A Taste of Honey (1984, BBC TV play) as Jo
- Minder (1984)
- Happy Families (1985)
- A Very Peculiar Practice (1986)
- Escape from Sobibor (1987, TV movie)
- Streetwise (1989–1991) as Angel
