= Second Generation Volume 1 =

1995 album by Mike Peters

Studio album by Mike Peters
- Released: 15 December 1995
- Recorded: 1995
- Genre: Rock

Mike Peters chronology
Breathe	Second Generation Volume 1 (1995)	Feel Free (1996)

Second Generation Volume 1 is an album by Mike Peters. The cover also contains the phrase "rare songs of The Alarm revisited". All tracks had previously appeared on albums or singles by The Alarm apart from "The Peace Train", which had only appeared in a non-lyrical format on the remastered edition of the album "Declaration".

== Track listing ==
1. "Second Generation"
2. "Majority"
3. "Elders & Folklore"
4. "Pavilion Steps"
5. "What Kind of Hell"
6. "Rose Beyond the Wall"
7. "Unbreak the Promise"
8. "Reason 41"
9. "Up for Murder"
10. "The Peace Train"

== Previous song releases ==
"Second Generation" was the third track to appear on the 12" vinyl version of the single "The Deceiver" from the album "Declaration".

"Majority" was originally recorded to be released on the album "Strength", but was dropped to a B-side to the single "Strength" from the same album.

"Elders & Folklore" started off as a name only to go on the 12" vinyl version of the single "Rescue Me". Once the band wrote the lyrics and recorded the song, they released how good it was and tried to get it pulled from production, but it was too late.

"Pavilion Steps" was the B-side to the single "Where were you Hiding when the Storm Broke?".

"What Kind of Hell" was the third track on the 12" vinyl version of the same single as above.

"Rose Beyond the Wall" was originally the B-side to the single "Rain in the Summertime"

"Unbreak the Promise" was never officially released. It appear in acoustic form on the 12" vinyl version of the single "Knife Edge". It has also been released in the remastered version of "Declaration".

"Reason 41" was the B-side to the single "The Deceiver". It was originally recorded by the former The Alarm guitarist Dave Sharp.

"Up for Murder" was the B-side to the debut single "Unsafe Building". It was also re-recorded for the B-side release of "Unsafe Building 1990". As above, it was originally sung by Dave Sharp.

"Peace Train" was never released. This version also includes part of the song for the single release of "The Chant has Just Begun".

== Volume 2? ==
A second volume was due for release almost straight away, but has yet to be released. Peters on his web site has stated that he has started to record tracks, so time will tell.

However, to celebrate the 30th anniversary of The Alarm in 2011 'The Sound and the Fury' – another album of rerecordings of old Alarm/Mike Peters/Coloursound songs – was released.

Track listing :

1. Unbreak The Promise
2. Shelter
3. The Rock
4. Peace Agreement
5. Fade In Fade Out Fade Away
6. Who's Gonna Make The Peace?
7. Strength To Strength
8. Back Into The System
9. How The Mighty Fall
10. For Freedom
11. Only The Thunder
12. Howling Wind

This album is not to be confused with the 1995 boxed set of Alarm live recordings, 'The Sound and the Fury: Live 1981-1991'
