= Now That's What I Call New Wave 80s =

Compilation album by various artists
- Released: August 7, 2015
- Genre: New wave
- Length: 68:00; 146:30 (Deluxe Edition)
- Label: Universal/Sony Music

Now That's What I Call New Wave 80s is a compilation album from the popular Now! series, released in the United States on August 7, 2015 on CD format. The album contains hit new wave songs of the 1980s. It reached No. 106 on the Billboard 200 and No. 16 on the Billboard Top Rock Albums chart.

A Deluxe Edition was also released in a digital-only format, which contains an extra 22 tracks on top of the initial 18, bringing the total number of songs to 40.

== Critical reception ==
Timothy Monger of AllMusic said, "This themed collection from the folks at Now Music features 18 prime cuts of 1980s new wave. [The album] manages to hit on major players like R.E.M., the Cure, the Human League, and Tears for Fears."

In a positive review by Paste Magazine, Ron Hart said of the album: "What makes this physical set so cool are the off-menu choices selected here, be it INXS's early hit “The One Thing” off 1982’s underrated Shabooh Shoobah, choosing the Thompson Twins’ hidden hit “Lies” over “Hold Me Now” and “Mad World” from Tears for Fears’ epic debut LP The Hurting in lieu of the litany of hits from Songs from the Big Chair. And that’s not to mention the incorporation of the fairly deep “Desperate But Not Serious” off his solo debut Friend or Foe for Adam Ant representation. Decisions such as these seem to indicate that NOW That's What I Call New Wave 80s was crafted by the hands of a master of the decade. The '80s new wave sound has made a comeback in a massive way in recent years, and this most exceptional megamix serves as a quality 101 class for any kid looking to dive headfirst into the day glow."

== Track listing ==
CD
No.	Title	Artist	Length
1.	"The One Thing"	INXS	3:22
2.	"Rebel Yell"	Billy Idol	4:46
3.	"What I Like About You"	The Romantics	2:55
4.	"Private Idaho"	The B-52's	3:33
5.	"Desperate But Not Serious"	Adam Ant	4:13
6.	"We Got the Beat"	The Go-Go's	2:30
7.	"Lies"	Thompson Twins	3:10
8.	"The Metro"	Berlin	4:06
9.	"Tenderness"	General Public	3:33
10.	"Just Like Heaven"	The Cure	3:30
11.	"Love My Way"	The Psychedelic Furs	3:30
12.	"If You Leave"	Orchestral Manoeuvres in the Dark	4:24
13.	"Lips Like Sugar"	Echo & the Bunnymen	4:48
14.	"In a Big Country"	Big Country	3:51
15.	"The One I Love"	R.E.M.	3:14
16.	"Mad World"	Tears for Fears	3:31
17.	"Sweet Dreams (Are Made of This)"	Eurythmics	4:50
18.	"Don't You Want Me"	The Human League	3:57

Deluxe Edition (includes the above and the following additional tracks)

Digital download
No.	Title	Artist	Length
19.	"Planet Earth"	Duran Duran	3:53
20.	"The Look of Love"	ABC	3:27
21.	"Perfect Way"	Scritti Politti	4:29
22.	"Whisper to a Scream (Birds Fly)"	The Icicle Works	3:46
23.	"You Spin Me Round (Like a Record)"	Dead or Alive	3:12
24.	"Don't Go"	Yazoo	3:01
25.	"Let Me Go"	Heaven 17	4:19
26.	"I Want Candy"	Bow Wow Wow	2:43
27.	"Tainted Love"	Soft Cell	2:36
28.	"I Ran"	A Flock of Seagulls	3:38
29.	"Chains of Love"	Erasure	3:31
30.	"What Is Love?"	Howard Jones	3:33
31.	"Come Back and Stay"	Paul Young	4:21
32.	"Under the Milky Way"	The Church	4:56
33.	"Rain in the Summertime"	The Alarm	3:43
34.	"Are We Ourselves?"	The Fixx	2:26
35.	"Mexican Radio"	Wall of Voodoo	4:06
36.	"Blister in the Sun"	Violent Femmes	2:23
37.	"Der Kommissar"	After the Fire	4:05
38.	"Never Say Never"	Romeo Void	3:26
39.	"Words"	Missing Persons	3:37
40.	"Goodbye to You"	Scandal	3:46

== See also ==
- Now That's What I Call the 80s (U.S. series)
