= David Buchanan =

David or Dave Buchanan may refer to:

== Sports ==
- David Buchanan (cricketer) (1830–1900), English cricketer
- Dave Buchanan (footballer, born 1873) (1878–1950), Scottish footballer
- Dave Buchanan (Canadian football) (born 1948), running back
- David Buchanan (footballer, born 1962), English former footballer
- David Buchanan (footballer, born 1986), English footballer
- David Buchanan (baseball) (born 1989), American baseball player
- Dave Buchanan, cricketer for Botswana, see 2008 ICC World Cricket League Division Five
- Dave Buchanan, cyclist, see The Hobbit's Tale

== Other ==
- David Buchanan, former bass guitarist for American band Yankee Grey
- David Buchanan (politician) (1823–1890), Australian barrister and politician
- David M. Buchanan (1862–1936), US Navy sailor
- David Vickers Buchanan, alternative name of David Vickers, fictional character
- Dave Buchanan, engineer on Raw

== See also ==
- Lee Buchanan (footballer) (Lee David Buchanan born 2001), English footballer
- Nick Buchanan (Australian cricketer) (Nicholas David Buchanan, born 1991)
- David McDowall (author) (David Buchanan McDowall, born 1945), British author
- David Parrish (David Buchanan Parrish, 1939–2021), American artist
