= Strength (The Alarm album) =

Studio album by The Alarm
- Released: 1985
- Recorded: Marcus Studios, London, June and July 1985
- Genres: Rock, new wave
- Length: 48:08
- Label: IRS
- Producer: Mike Howlett

The Alarm chronology
Declaration (1984)	Strength (1985)	Eye of the Hurricane (1987)

Singles from Strength
- 1. "Absolute Reality" Released: 1985; 2. "Strength" Released: 1985; 3. "Spirt of '76" Released: 1986; 4. "Knife Edge" Released: 1986

Professional ratings
Review scores
Source	Rating
AllMusic	4.5/5 stars
Kerrang!	4.5/5 stars

Strength is the second studio album by Welsh rock band the Alarm, released in 1985 on IRS Records. The single "Strength" was released before the album, reaching No. 40 on the UK Singles Chart. This was followed after the album release by "Spirit of '76", which reached No. 22 and saw the band on Top of the Pops and in various other TV appearances. "Knife Edge" was the final single from the album to be released, just failing to reach the top 40, peaking at #43.

The album was initially released on vinyl LP, vinyl picture disc and cassette. As technology improved, a CD version was released.

An extended remastered version was released in 2000, with a revised track listing, B-sides and previously unreleased recordings, plus new and original artwork, photos, lyrics, sleeve notes by Mike Peters and interactive programming information to play the album in its original form.

Alt-Strength is a full set of demos that was released as a double-CD set on 12 November 2001.

Strength 1985-1986 is a remastered double-CD set featuring the original album, unreleased studio sessions, and 12" mixes issued in 2019.

The title track was later covered by American rock band Skid Row on their 2006 album Revolutions per Minute.

== Track listing ==
All songs written by Eddie Macdonald and Mike Peters, except "Strength", which was written by the Alarm.

1. "Knife Edge" - 5:06
2. "Strength" - 5:34
3. "Dawn Chorus" - 5:24
4. "Spirit of '76" - 7:05
5. "Deeside" - 3:08
6. "Father to Son" - 4:04
7. "Only the Thunder" - 4:06
8. "The Day the Ravens Left the Tower" - 4:45
9. "Absolute Reality" - 3:24 (not included on the UK version of album)
10. "Walk Forever by My Side" - 3:32

=== Remastered release track listing ===
1. "Strength" - 5:34
2. "Knife Edge" - 5:09
3. "Spirit of '76" - 7:04
4. "Walk Forever by My Side" - 3:34
5. "Father to Son" - 4:05
6. "Deeside" - 3:10
7. "Majority" - 3:22
8. "One Step Closer to Home" (Electric Version) - 4:28
9. "Caroline Isenberg" - 2:41
10. "Dawn Chorus" - 5:25
11. "Only the Thunder" - 4:42
12. "The Day the Ravens Left the Tower" - 4:46
13. "Absolute Reality" - 3:31
14. "Where Were You When the Storm Broke?" (Live) - 3:30
15. "Deeside" (Live) - 3:11
16. "Sixty Eight Guns" (Live) - 6:59
17. "Knocking on Heaven's Door" (Live) - 4:26

== Credits ==
Recorded at Marcus Studios, London, June–July 1985.

=== Band members ===
- Mike Peters - vocals
- David Sharp - guitars
- Eddie MacDonald - bass
- Nigel Twist - drums

=== Additional musicians ===
- Rupert Black - keyboards
- Anonymous - harmonica on "Spirit of '76" and "Deeside"

=== Production ===
- Mike Howlett - producer, mixing
- Nigel Luby - engineer, mixing

== Alt-Strength ==
Alt-Strength is a double CD that includes demos and warm-up covers from the Strength recording sessions.

Alt-Strength cover.

=== Track listing ===
==== Disc 1 ====
Nov. 29th-30th 1984 E-Zee Hire Demos

1. "Knife Edge"
2. "Absolute Reality"
3. "Sons of Divorce"
4. "One Step Closer to Home"
5. "Rose Beyond the Wall"
6. "Steeltown (Deeside)"
7. "We Are Majority"
8. "Black Side of Fortune"
9. "The Day the Ravens Left the Tower"

April 4, 1985 Roundhouse, London Jam Session

1. "Get It On" (T. Rex cover)
2. "Summertime Blues" (Eddie Cochran cover)
3. "Gimme All Your Lovin'" (ZZ Top cover)
4. "Alarm Alarm" (Toilets/17 cover)
5. "Radar Love" (Golden Earring cover)
6. "Burn" (Deep Purple cover)
7. "Black Night" (Deep Purple cover)
8. "You Can't Always Get What You Want" (Rolling Stones cover)
9. "Walk on the Wild Side" (Lou Reed cover)
10. "Vicious" (Lou Reed cover)
11. "All Right Now" (Free cover)
12. "Communication Breakdown" (Led Zeppelin cover)
13. "It's in the Charts"
14. "Maggie May/Maggie's Farm/Stand Down Margaret" (Rod Stewart/Bob Dylan/The Beat cover)

April 4–10, 1985 Roundhouse Demos/Mixes

1. "Dawn Chorus"
2. "Knife Edge"

==== Disc 2 ====
May 10, 1985: Birmingham Odeon Sound Check

1. "Give Me Love (Strength)"

May 17, 1985 Pluto Studios Recording Sessions

1. "In the Cold Light of Day"

June/July 1985: Main Recording Sessions, Marcus Studios

1. "River Still to Cross"

June 27, 1985 Rough Mixes

1. "Strength"
2. "Spirit of '76"
3. "Deeside"
4. "For Tomorrow (Father to Son)"
5. "Majority"
6. "Absolute Reality"
7. "One Step Closer to Home"
8. "Only the Thunder"
9. "Day the Ravens Left the Tower"
10. "Walk Forever by My Side"

July 15, 1985 Marcus Studios Rough Mixes

1. "Strength"
2. "Spirit of '76"
