= Love Hope Strength =

Charitable organization

- Founded: 2003
- Founders: James Chippendale, Mike Peters (musician)
- Type: Charitable foundation
- Location: Colorado, U.S.
- Services: Fundraising for cancer, leukemia patients
- Website: lovehopestrength.org lovehopestrength.co.uk

Love Hope Strength Foundation is a charitable foundation whose purpose is to raise funds and awareness in order to benefit people with cancer and leukaemia. The charity sponsors treks and climbs to the world's highest mountains, often performing musical concerts at the peak.

== Origins ==
In the spring of 2001, at age 31, James Chippendale, an American businessman, was diagnosed with leukemia, needing a bone marrow transplant to recover. After his recovery in 2003, he founded a cancer charity, the Love Hope Strength Foundation (LHSF), with fellow cancer survivor Mike Peters, a Welsh musician and lead singer with The Alarm. Together they had the vision that LHSF could literally, “Save lives, one concert at a time!”

== Activities ==
Love Hope Strength Foundation raises funds for cancer treatment, promotes awareness and early detection, and advocates for bone marrow registration by holding rock concerts at remote, elevated venues, including Everest base camp, the top of the Empire State Building, the Inca ruins of Machu Picchu, with a concert at Mount Kilimanjaro in 2009. The United Kingdom organisation holds an annual summer trek to the top of Wales's highest mountain, Snowdon, called Snowdon Rocks. Additional events have been added, such as Rhondda Rocks, Avebury Rocks and Ben Nevis Rocks.

LHSF concerts feature both amateur and professional musicians and have featured high-profile rock musicians including Chuck Berry, The Fixx's Cy Curnin, Squeeze's Glenn Tilbrook, Everclear, The Beat, Nick Harper, Chris Summerill and members of The Cult. The first four shows had raised almost $1 million by September 2008.

LHSF is a beneficiary of a documentary film called More To Live For, which details James Chippendale's cancer and survivorship experience.
