= Declaration (The Alarm album) =

Studio album by The Alarm
- Released: February 13, 1984
- Recorded: November 1983
- Studio: Abbey Road Studios and Good Earth Studios, London, UK
- Genre: Rock, new wave
- Length: 49:47
- Label: I.R.S. (USA, UK & Europe); Illegal (New Zealand)
- Producer: Alan Shacklock

The Alarm chronology
The Alarm (1983)	Declaration (1984)	Strength (1985)

Singles from Declaration
- 1. "Marching On" Released: 1982; 2. "The Stand" Released: 1983; 3. "Sixty Eight Guns" Released: 16 September 1983; 4. "Where Were You Hiding When the Storm Broke?" Released: 1984; 5. "The Deceiver" Released: 1984

Declaration is the debut studio album from Welsh rock band The Alarm. It was released on February 13, 1984 by IRS Records. The album was released initially on vinyl and cassette. A CD version was released in the U.S. by June 1984. An extended re-master version was released in 2000, including extra tracks.

== Critical reception ==
Professional ratings
Review scores
Source	Rating
AllMusic	3.5/5 stars
The Village Voice	C+
Rolling Stone	4/5 stars

Rolling Stone magazine wrote: "This is one of the best new live bands I heard last year, and they've put a lot of that power into their first album." Billboard predicted that the album's "acoustic guitar driven attack" would assist in attaining airplay on album oriented rock radio stations. William Ruhlmann wrote in a mixed to favorable review in AllMusic that "the Alarm seemed to play every song as if it was the climax of their set. In the short term, that excited listeners, however; Declaration was a number six hit in England and broke through to the Top 50 in the U.S. In retrospect, it's more smoke than fire."

== Track listing ==
All songs written by Eddie Macdonald and Mike Peters, except where noted.

Side one

1. "Declaration" – 0:45
2. "Marching On" – 3:35
3. "Where Were You Hiding When the Storm Broke?" – 2:56
4. "Third Light" – 3:25
5. "Sixty Eight Guns" – 5:49
6. "We Are the Light" – 3:16

Side two

7. "Shout to the Devil" (Macdonald, Peters, David Sharp) – 4:10
8. "Blaze of Glory" (Macdonald, Peters, Sharp) – 6:04
9. "Tell Me" (Sharp) – 3:14
10. "The Deceiver" – 5:05
11. "The Stand (Prophecy)" (Macdonald, Peters, Sharp) – 1:15
12. "Howling Wind" – 6:44

2000 Remastered CD edition bonus tracks

1. "The Peace Train"
2. "Reason 41"
3. "Second Generation"
4. "Unbreak the Promise"
5. "The Chant Has Just Begun"
6. "Bells of Rhymney"
7. "Bound for Glory"
8. "Absolute Reality"

== Single releases ==
"Marching On", "The Stand", "Sixty Eight Guns" and "Where Were You Hiding When the Storm Broke?" had already been released as singles before the album went on sale. "The Deceiver" was the only single to be released from the album after this time.

== Personnel ==
The Alarm

- Mike Peters – vocals, acoustic guitar, harmonica
- Dave Sharp – acoustic and electric guitars, vocals
- Eddie Macdonald – bass, electric guitar, bowed guitar, vocals
- Twist – drums, percussion, vocals

Production

- Alan Shacklock – producer
- Chris Porter – engineer
- Michael Ross, Simon Adamcewski – artwork
- Robert Mason – illustrations
- Stephen Oliver – photography
