= Jynine James =

Welsh actress and singer

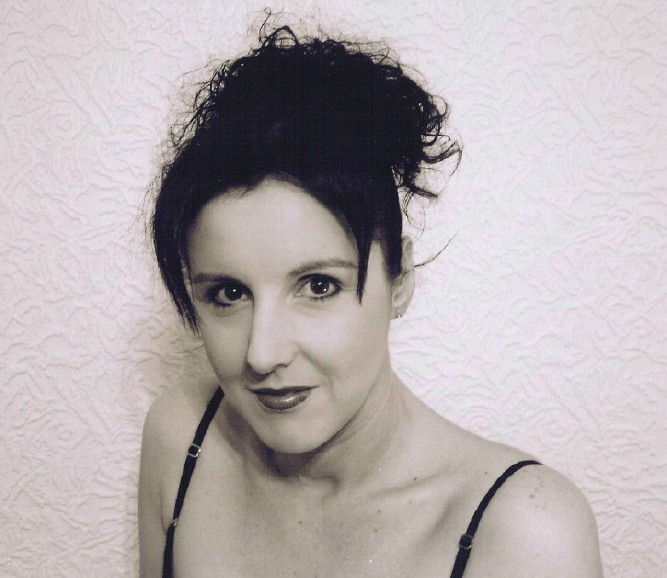
- James in 2005
- Born: Janine Bellis; 30 March 1972 (age 54); Wrexham, Wales
- Occupations: Actress, singer
- Years active: 1990s–present

Jynine James (born Janine Bellis; 30 March 1972) is a Welsh actress and singer.

== Biography ==
Born in Wrexham, North Wales, James is a former convent schoolgirl who became a photographic model in the early 1990s working for corporate companies such as Contessa and Chris Evans Photography, in a rebellious stand from her strict schooling. By 1992, she obtained recording contract and the release of a number of singles and an album. During the 1990s, she worked and recorded with musicians Paul Burgess on percussion (10cc and Icicle Works), Tim Sanders vocalist and songwriter (The City Zones), Steve Millington keyboards and songwriter (Kes) and guitarist Peter Frampton. Both Burgess and Frampton appeared on her first single release "No Reason" issued both on 7-inch single, as a limited issue and CD single format by Fast Tracks Records in 1993. James's studio recorded album followed and despite the pedigree of the performers featured on the recordings it failed to make any significant impression on the UK record charts. She has appeared on TV and in films both in the UK and US After a long professional association with the Carry On film production team, James attended a number of promotional events, radio and TV interviews in an attempt to promote and raise the profile of a new proposed film Carry On London. She was not only signed to appear in the film but also supply some of the music for the film's soundtrack. However, due to the death of Carry On film producer Peter Rogers this now seems unlikely to go into full production.

James has also appeared with Phil Daniels in the Sara Sugarman 2012 (2013 in the UK) film Vinyl, the Tim Burton film Charlie and the Chocolate Factory, and the BAFTA-nominated BBC Three reality TV series Little Angels.

In 2010, reissued and remixed versions of Jynine James's singles "No Reason" and "When I Dream" were released worldwide for the first time on digital download. This led to new music recordings and the release of further material including the haunting 'Past Shadows'.

In 2017, James played the role of Magistrate in the award-winning feature film, Is this Now, directed by Joe Scott, and also appeared in a number of promotional videos for a children's cancer charity.

== Filmography ==
Year	Title	Character	Production	Director
2005	Charlie and the Chocolate Factory	Salt's Nuts girl	Warner Bros films	Tim Burton
2012	Vinyl	Mourner	Altive films	Sara Sugarman
2017	Is This Now	Magistrate	Ace Films	Joe Scott
