= Eye of the Hurricane (The Alarm album) =

Studio album by The Alarm
- Released: 19 October 1987
- Recorded: 1987
- Genre: Rock, new wave
- Length: 40:56 (original release)
- Label: I.R.S.
- Producer: John Porter, The Alarm

The Alarm chronology
Strength (1985)	Eye of the Hurricane (1987)	Electric Folklore Live (1988)

Singles from Eye of the Hurricane
- 1. "Rain in the Summertime" Released: 5 October 1987; 2. "Rescue Me" Released: 1987; 3. "Presence of Love" Released: 1988

Professional ratings
Review scores
Source	Rating
AllMusic	3/5 stars
New Musical Express	6/10
The Rolling Stone Album Guide	2.5/5 stars

Eye of the Hurricane is the third studio album by the Welsh band the Alarm, released in October 1987 on I.R.S. Records in North America. The following month, the label issued the album in the United Kingdom. It was one of the albums affected by an import ban pursuant to an agreement with the British Phonographic Industry and Mechanical-Copyright Protection Society on import licenses. "Rain in the Summertime" was released as the lead single from the album and reached both the UK and US single charts.

Eye of the Hurricane was the band's first studio album in two years and the material was divided into a "Folklore" side and an "Electric" side. The album was initially released on vinyl LP and cassette, reaching number 23 in the UK charts and number 77 in the US charts. A CD version was released later the same year and in 2000 an extended re-mastered version was released, including extra tracks.

== Critical reception ==
Both contemporary and retrospective reviewers compared Eye of the Hurricane to the work of Irish rock band U2. Billboard wrote that the album demonstrated "all the intensity of U2 but with the capacity for much hookier melodies." Cashbox said that album was "atmospheric and spiritually-minded" rock music and that "while comparisons to U-know-who are too obvious, Mike Peters et al have the vision and depth to create their own niche." William Ruhlmann believed that the album "marked the limits of their appeal" and thought that the band struggled to get "out from under the shadow of their mentors, U2", adding that the association with the band "only hurt them".

Music & Media dismissed some material on the album as "useless U2 imitations" but labeled "Hallowed Ground" and the title track as "inspired". Music Week called Eyes of the Hurricane the band's "most evenly balanced album" and "their best to date".

== Track listing ==
All songs written by Eddie MacDonald & Mike Peters, except where noted.

Folklore

1. "Rain in the Summertime" - 5:12
2. "Newtown Jericho" - 4:05
3. "Hallowed Ground" - 4:17
4. "One Step Closer to Home" (Dave Sharp, Nigel Twist) - 4:31
5. "Shelter" (The Alarm) - 3:08

Electric

1. "Rescue Me" - 3:19
2. "Permanence in Change" - 4:01
3. "Presence of Love" - 4:01
4. "Only Love Can Set Me Free" - 4:22
5. "Eye of the Hurricane" - 3:38

== Personnel ==
=== Band members ===
- Mike Peters - Lead vocals, acoustic and electric guitars, harmonica
- David Sharp - Lead guitar, acoustic guitar, vocals on "One Step Closer to Home"
- Eddie MacDonald - Bass, bass synthesizer, keyboards, programming, backing vocals
- Nigel Twist - Drums, Linn Drum programming, backing vocals

=== Additional musicians ===
- Chris Stainton - Piano and Hammond organ (tracks A4, B4, and B5)
- Mark Taylor - Piano and DX7 Synthesizer (all other tracks, except A5)
- John Porter - Programming

=== Technical ===
Recorded & mixed at Great Linford Manor.

- Tony Platt - engineer
- David Leonard - mixing
- The Alarm and John Porter - production

== Single releases ==
- "Rain in the Summertime" was released before the album, reaching number 18 in the UK Singles Chart and number 71 on the Billboard Hot 100.
- The album surfaced prior to the release of the second single, "Rescue Me", which reached number 48 and saw the band on The Roxy. "Rescue Me" also gained some exposure in the US, thanks to its appearance on the original soundtrack from the then-brand new TV series 21 Jump Street.
- "Presence of Love" was the third and final single, peaking just shy of the Top 40.

== Remastered release ==
Released in 2000, the remastered edition featured a revised track listings, b-sides and previously unreleased recordings, new and original artwork, unseen photos, lyrics, sleeve notes by Mike Peters and interactive programming information to play the album in its original form.

=== Track listing ===
1. "Electric"
2. "Newtown Jericho"
3. "Rain in the Summertime"
4. "Rose Beyond the Wall"
5. "Hallowed Ground"
6. "One Step Closer to Home"
7. "Shelter"
8. "Folklore"
9. "Eye of the Hurricane"
10. "Permanence in Change"
11. "Presence of Love"
12. "World on Fire"
13. "A Time to Believe"
14. "Only Love Can Set Me Free"
15. "Rescue Me"
16. "A New South Wales"
17. "Elders and Folklore"
18. "My Land Your Land"
19. "Pastures of Plenty"
20. "Rescue Me (Tearing The Bonds Assunder Mix)"
21. "Rain in the Summertime (Thunder/Through The Haze Mix)"
