= Change (The Alarm album) =

Studio album by The Alarm
- Released: September 1989
- Recorded: 1988–1989
- Genre: Rock
- Length: 58:52 (English CD version)
- Label: IRS
- Producer: Tony Visconti

The Alarm chronology
Electric Folklore Live (1988)	Change (1989)	Standards (1990)

Singles from Change
- 1. "Sold Me Down the River" Released: 1989; 2. "A New South Wales" Released: 1989; 3. "Devolution Workin' Man Blues" Released: 1989; 4. "Love Don't Come Easy" Released: 1990

Professional ratings
Review scores
Source	Rating
Allmusic	3/5 stars
Christgau's Record Guide	C

Change is the fourth studio album by Welsh rock band The Alarm. It was released in September 1989 on IRS Records.

The album was released initially on vinyl LP, cassette and CD, reaching No. 13 in the UK charts and No. 75 in the US charts.

An extended re-mastered version was released, including extra tracks.

== Singles ==
"Sold Me Down the River" was released before the album, reaching No. 43 in the UK singles chart. This was followed after the album release by "A New South Wales", which reached No. 31 and saw the band on Top of the Pops and Wogan. "Love Don't Come Easy" was the third and final single, just failing to reach the Top 40.

== Track listing ==
All songs written by Eddie Macdonald and Mike Peters, except where noted.

1. "Sold Me Down the River" – 5:25
2. "The Rock" (The Alarm) – 4:39
3. "Devolution Workin' Man Blues" – 4:11
4. "Love Don't Come Easy" – 4:08
5. "Hardland" – 4:09
6. "Change II" (Dave Sharp, Nigel Twist) – 2:52
7. "No Frontiers" – 3:53
8. "Scarlet" – 4:17
9. "Where a Town Once Stood" (The Alarm) – 3:48
10. "Black Sun" (The Alarm) – 4:30 *
11. "Prison Without Prison Bars" – 3:48
12. "How the Mighty Fall" – 4:19 *
13. "Rivers to Cross" (The Alarm) – 3:42
14. "A New South Wales" – 4:46

Note

- Released as limited edition free single with vinyl LP

== Personnel ==
LP back cover.

Arranged by The Alarm.

- Mike Peters – vocals
- Dave Sharp – guitar
- Eddie Macdonald – bass
- Mark Taylor – keyboards
- Twist – drums

Technical

- Tony Visconti – producer, engineer

Notes: Lookout management: Elliot Roberts and Barry Dickens

Recorded at the Skylight Suite and Mixed Good Earths Studios

"A New South Wales" Recorded at BBC Wales Cardiff with the Morriston Orpheus Male Voice Choir and members of the Welsh Symphony Orchestra

== Welsh release ==
An edition of the album sung in Welsh called Newid was released in 1989.

=== Track listing ===
1. "Gwerthoch Fi I Lawr Yr Afon" – 4:09
2. "Y Graig" – 4:39
3. "Datganoli Y Falen Gweithiwr" – 4:11
4. "Dydi Cariad Byth Yn Hawdd" – 4:08
5. "Hiraeth" – 4:09
6. "Newid II" – 2:52
7. "Dim Ffiniau" – 3:53
8. "Ysgarlad" – 4:18
9. "Ble Sefa Dref" – 3:48
10. "Rhyddid Caeth" – 3:48
11. "Croesi'r Afon" – 3:42
12. "Hwylio Dros Y Môr" – 4:47

== Japanese promotional release ==
A Japanese 15-track promo-only CD was released including a different track list, custom picture sleeve and Japanese biography.

=== Track listing ===
Japanese front cover.

1. "Declaration"
2. "Marching On"
3. "68 Guns"
4. "The Stand (Full Length Version)"
5. "Absolute Reality"
6. "Strength"
7. "Spirit of '76"
8. "Rain in the Summertime"
9. "Rescue Me"
10. "Sold Me Down the River"
11. "Hardland"
12. "Change II"
13. "No Frontiers"
14. "Black Sun"
15. "A New South Wales"

== Remastered release ==
Released in 2000, the remastered edition featured a revised track listings, b-sides and previously unreleased recordings, new and original artwork, unseen photos, lyrics, sleeve notes by Mike Peters and interactive programming information to play the album in its original form.

== Change demos ==
Two-disc release including 16 acoustic tracks from a 1988 L.A. demo session with Mike Peters and Eddie MacDonald and 20+ electric tracks with the full band at the 1988–1989 Kinmell Hall demo sessions in Wales.
