= Vinyl (2012 film) =

- Directed by: Sara Sugarman
- Written by: Sara Sugarman & Jim Cooper
- Produced by: John H. Williams, Clay Reed & Sara Sugarman
- Starring: Phil Daniels; Keith Allen; Jamie Blackley
- Cinematography: Benji Bakshi
- Edited by: Hazel Baillie
- Music by: Mike Peters
- Distributed by: Shout! Studios
- Release dates: April 2012 (Newport Beach International Film Festival); 15 March 2013 (United Kingdom)
- Running time: 85 minutes
- Country: United Kingdom
- Language: English

Vinyl is a 2012 British comedy film written and directed by Sara Sugarman. It is based on the true story of Mike Peters and The Alarm who in 2004 released the single "45 RPM" under the name of a fictitious band "The Poppy Fields".

The film features a number of past pop and rock stars in cameo roles, such as Steve Diggle (Buzzcocks), Jynine James, Mike Peters and Tim Sanders (The City Zones), along with the actors Phil Daniels, Keith Allen, Perry Benson, Jamie Blackley and Julia Ford.

Vinyl has a soundtrack written and performed by The Alarm with Mike Peters, Phil Daniels and Keith Allen all making contributions.

Filmed mostly on location in Rhyl, it features many local attractions and features. Despite being a USA production the cast is totally British with many of the actors having connections to North Wales, particularly Rhyl. The cast also includes many past members of The Rhyl T.I.C. (Theatre in the Community) which at the time of filming provided many of the younger cast including members of the fake band, the auditionees, security guards, music business employees and of course the fans. The local community of Rhyl also provided location venues in which the crew could film such as The Rhyl Pavilion, Robin Hood Caravan Park, Glan Clwyd Hospital and The Bistro night club. This allowed the film to stay close to the original true story and have the feel of an authentic biog picture.

== Synopsis ==
The film follows the fortunes of washed-up punk rocker Johnny Jones (Phil Daniels) and his attempts to make a comeback into the British music charts. After a drunken session with his old bandmates, Johnny records what he feels could be a hit. However, faced with record company executives who no longer see him or his music as relevant, he hires a group of fresh-faced youngsters to film a video in which they mime to his music. The result is a record contract and a single racing up the charts. All goes well until the real band decide they want more recognition for their work. Due to a conflict between Minto, played by Keith Allen, and Johnny Jones, it is not long before the truth is exposed. Suddenly, the media focus is back on Johnny and his fight for equality in the music business. This leads to a comedic finale and a heartwarming ending.

== Cinematic release ==
- US Limited release April 2012
- UK National release 15 March 2013

== Awards ==
- Winner of The Valley Film Festival "10 Degrees Hotter" Award for Best Feature
