= Rise (Mike Peters album) =

1998 Mike Peters album

Studio album by Mike Peters
- Released: 26 February 1998
- Recorded: 1998
- Genre: Rock
- Label: Eagle Rock Entertainment
- Producer: Mike Peters

Mike Peters chronology
Feel Free (1996)	Rise (1998)	Flesh & Blood (2000)

Rise is an album by the Welsh musician Mike Peters. His third solo album, it was released in 1998 by Eagle Rock Entertainment.

== Track listing ==
All songs were written by Peters, except "In Circles", which was co-written by Peters and Billy Duffy.

1. "In Circles" 4:47
2. "Transcendental" 5:17
3. "Rise" 4:06
4. "You Are To Me" 5:01
5. "My Calling" 4:42
6. "First Light" 4:59
7. "High On The Hill" 4:40
8. "Ground Zero" 4:06
9. "White Noise [Part II]" 4:37
10. "The Wasting Land" 4:40
11. "Burnout Syndrome" 7:00

== Promotional release ==
To promote the album in the US, a compact disc release was made available for the complete album. This edition included three tracks not released in the UK:

1. "I Want You"
2. "The Message"
3. "White Noise Part III"

There was also another compact disc release for the US only titled "Mike Peters Sampler" containing:

1. "Transcendental - Radio Edit" 3:52
2. "Sold Me Down The River" 3:04
3. "Rain In The Summertime" 3:15
4. "Rescue Me" 1:45
5. "Interview With Mike Peters" 10:11

== North American release ==
The North American release of the album included three tracks not released in the UK:

1. "I Want You"
2. "The Message" (The Mess-age mix)
3. "White Noise Part III" (Snakebite mix)

== Album background ==
Peters' describes In Circles as about living in the present, stopping to appreciate the here and the now. It's about life as the best drug available and the human being as the most interesting lifeform in the universe. Peters was kicking the song around in a minor key when Billy Duffy suggested the major key. Peters wrote the chorus and the lyrics whilst on tour in France.

Transcendental began life as a Jules Jones composition based around the main piano melody and verse. Peters later added the bridge and chorus. The song was first demoed using harmonica and acoustic guitar but when it entered the second phase using the band, it was decided to get as close to the original piano feel as possible. To this end Peters experimented with an old electric piano, and then came across the 'Procol Harum' organ sound. The drums were recorded using only one microphone and a lot of compression to achieve that authentic sound and mixed in with a trip hop loop.

High on the Hill is dedicated to Chris Anderson who was a great friend of Peters. Anderson was a great source of encouragement and faith when Peters Himself was diagnosed, and subsequently cleared, of having cancer. Later, Anderson was himself diagnosed with the illness not long after Peters received the all clear. Anderson died shortly before the recording of the 'Rise' album. Peters dedicated 'High On The Hill' to Anderson and also used his guitar to record the song with. His family were all present for the recording session.

Peters describes The Wasting Land as a requiem of lost opportunity.

In Burnout Syndrome Duffy strapped on his guitar and lashed into a solo. Duffy even blew the amps during the last bar of the song and listeners can actually hear the electronics burning out in the recording of the song.

== Credits ==
Mike Peters Producer and vocals
Billy Duffy Guitar

== Rise Tour ==
Peters completed a UK tour with band members James Stevenson on guitar (Gene Loves Jezebel), Craig Adams on bass (Sisters of Mercy, The Mission, Cult) and Johnny Donnelly on drums (The Saw Doctors).

The tour kicked off with the now traditional event "The Gathering" in Llandudno.

Rise Tour UK 1998

January

9 / 10 / 11 "The Gathering" The North Wales Conference Centre, Llandudno
17th Bristol Fleece and Firkin
18th Wolverhampton Varsity
20th Leeds Duchess Of York
21st Scunthorpe Lincoln Imp
22nd Falkirk Martells
23rd Glasgow King Tuts
24th Dundee Westport Bars
25th Dumfries
26th Middlesbrough Cornerhouse
28th Sheffield Boardwalk
29th Cheltenham Axiom Centre
30th Blackburn King George's Hall
31st Nottingham Rock City

February

1st York Fibbers
3rd Liverpool Lomax
5th Leicester Princess Charlotte
6th Stoke Wheatsheaf
7th Manchester University Hop & Grape
8th Cambridge Boatrace
10th Birmingham Xposures
11th Norwich Oval
12th Colchester Arts Centre
13th Tunbridge Forum
14th Swansea Patti Pavilions

== Rise demos release ==
In 1999 Peters released a double compact disc edition of the album titled "Rise demos" (also referred to as "mikepeters.rise. demos")via His own 21st Century label.

This featured the ‘Rise’ album tracks at 3 different stages:

Conception – Early ideas and sketches of songs from Peter’s notepad tape recorder.
Acoustic – The songs taken one step further with the addition of acoustic guitar, drum rhythms.
Electric – Where Peters took the songs into a demo studio to test them in an electric environment, played by the band.

Track listing was as follows:

Acoustic

1. song introduction
2. my calling
3. break bread with me
4. song introduction
5. down the road
6. songwriting extract – untitled
7. rise
8. in circles [mark one]
9. songwriting sequence – first light
10. first light
11. songwriting extract – untitled
12. transcendental
13. white noise pt.II
14. songwriting extract – the wasting lands
15. the wasting land
16. songwriting extract – high on the hill
17. high on the hill
18. i’m falling
19. songwriting sequence – untitled [one]
20. songwriting sequence – untitled [two]
21. burnout syndrome
22. songwriting extract – untitled
23. you are to me
24. songwriting extract – untitled

Electric

1. ground zerø
2. white noise [pt.II]
3. the wasting land
4. first light
5. i’m falling
6. i want you
7. you are to me
8. rise
9. high on the hill
10. burnout syndrome
11. songwriting extract - in circles
12. in circles
13. transcendental
14. break bread with me

Peters stated on 30 March 1999 regarding this release:

"Where does an album begin and when is an album finished? Personally, I never try to think I am working on a specific album as such, I never stop writing songs for starters, my whole life seems to revolve around one huge album with each title merely a snapshot of my experiences along the way. You see, songwriting is my passion, I like nothing better than attempting to fit words to music and music to words. I do it for many reasons, but for the most part I do it because I enjoy it. To be able to record something that has been created out of nothing and share it with someone else is a wonderful experience."

To make a new album, I try and write as many songs as possible without putting my own ‘self’ in the way of the creative process until certain themes begin to reveal themselves and can collectively be heard as a complete album. Sometimes, I feel like I am working in the dark, compelled towards some unspecified goal. Sometimes, I have begun only to find I have finished. Sometimes, a whole universe can be opened up where at first I sensed nothing. Sometimes what is right can be revealed by what is wrong. When putting together this collection of "mikepeters.rise. demos", I decided to present the songs in the order that they were recorded.

I hope in this way, you can hear everything in the sequence that I first heard it, and maybe begin to understand the excitement I felt, as the "Rise" album was revealed to me."
