= Breathe (Mike Peters album) =

1994 album by Mike Peters

Studio album by Mike Peters
- Released: 1 October 1994
- Recorded: 1994
- Genre: Rock
- Label: Crai

Mike Peters chronology
Breathe (1994)	Feel Free (1996)

Professional ratings
Review scores
Source	Rating
Music Week	3/5 stars

Breathe is the debut solo album by Mike Peters. It was released on compact disc, cassette and double vinyl LP.

The two singles, "Back into the System" and "It Just Don't Get Any Better Than This", were included on the cassette and vinyl LP version only.

The vinyl version was released on 17 January 1995 via Vital Distribution Limited. A Welsh version titled "AER" was released on 1 March 2000. An acoustic version of the album was released in 1995, followed by a remastered extended edition in 2008.

== Track listing ==
All songs were written by Peters.

1. "Poetic Justice"
2. "All I Wanted"
3. "If I Can't Have U"
4. "Breathe"
5. "Love is a Revolution"
6. "Whose Gonna Make the Peace?"
7. "Spiritual"
8. "What the World Can't Give Me"
9. "Beautiful Thing"
10. "Into the 21st Century"
11. "This is War"
12. "The Message"
13. "Back into the System" †
14. "It Just Don't Get Any Better Than This" †
15. "Train a Comin'"
16. "A New Chapter (Reprise)"

† Cassette and LP only

== Promotional release ==
To promote the album, a compact disc release was made available entitled Breathe Promo, containing the tracks "Levis and Bibles", "Love is a Revolution", "Spiritual", "If I Can't Have You" and "Breathe".

== Welsh release ==
A Welsh version titled AER was released on 1 March 2000.

== Welsh track listing ==
1. "Cyfiawnder Cyfiawn"
2. "Chwyldro Yw Cariad"
3. "Os Na Ga'i Ti"
4. "Aer"
5. "Ti Yw Y Cyfan"
6. "Pwy Fydd Eisie Heddwch"
7. "Ysbrydol"
8. "Dim Gwell Na Hyn"
9. "Levi's A Beiblau"
10. "Dyma'r Ganrif Newydd"
11. "Tren"
12. "Nol i Mewn i'r System"
13. "Y Bennod Newydd"

== Acoustic release ==
In the same year, Peters released an acoustic version of the album entitled The Acoustic Sessions.

These were new recordings made in the Summer of 1994 in Wales

== Acoustic track listing ==
Breathe Acoustic

Studio album by Mike Peters
- Genre: Rock
- Label: Crai

1. "Poetic Justice"
2. "Beautiful Thing"
3. "Whose Gonna Make the Peace?"
4. "Spiritual"
5. "Breathe"
6. "Into the 21st Century"
7. "This is War"
8. "Levi's and Bibles"
9. "Love is a Revolution"
10. "Train a Comin''"

== Expanded edition ==
Breathe expanded

Studio album by Mike Peters
- Recorded: 2008
- Genre: Rock
- Label: Crai

A remastered and expanded edition of the album was released in 2008 as a three-disc set.

Disc 1 - Contained the original album remastered.

Disc 2 - Levi's & Bibles included both 'Back Into The System' and 'No Better Than This' singles and b-sides plus previously unreleased tracks including Poets Of Justice demo tracks 'Levi's And Bibles' and 'Train A Comin', four Peters solo recordings and two unreleased Alan Shacklock produced versions of 'War' and 'If I Can't Have You'. Disc 2 also included a previously unreleased studio version of 'Planet Earth' and a Peters home recording of title track 'Breathe'.

Disc 3 - 'Breathe on Film' DVD featured previously unseen films of the original 'Breathe Recording Sessions' from 1994 plus a 'Return to Brixton' home movie which features Peters. The DVD also contained promo films of 'Back Into The System', No Better Than This' and a previously unseen video treatment for 'Devil's World' plus six Mike Peters and the Poets 'Live' TV performances. The set included a 16 Page full colour booklet with sleeve notes by Peters, complete lyrics and original artwork from 1994.
