= Rain in the Summertime =

Single by The Alarm

from the album Eye of the Hurricane
- B-side: "Rose Beyond The Wall"
- Released: 5 October 1987
- Recorded: June 1987
- Studio: Linford Manor
- Genre: Alternative rock, new wave
- Length: 5:12
- Label: I.R.S.
- Songwriters: Mike Peters, Eddie MacDonald
- Producers: John Porter, The Alarm

The Alarm singles chronology
| "Knife Edge" (1986) | "Rain in the Summertime" (1987) | "Rescue Me" (1987) |

"Rain in the Summertime" is a song by Welsh rock band the Alarm. It was written by members Mike Peters and Eddie MacDonald and released as the lead single from the band's 1987 album Eye of the Hurricane. The song became the band's second top 20 hit in the UK and also their second song to reach the US Billboard Hot 100. Elsewhere, the song charted in Canada, Ireland, and New Zealand.

== Background ==
Mike Peters, the band's guitarist, commented that "Rain in the Summertime" was created in a "spontaneous" manner and that it was the "last song written for Eye of the Hurricane". The song was demoed on a tape recorder during a jam session at a rehearsal space before The Alarm began the sessions for Eye of the Hurricane. Peters played the song for their producer John Porter, who then assembled the song's arrangement on an Atari computer by using the best parts of the demo. Other members of The Alarm, including Nigel Twist and MacDonald, then provided some additional instrumentation to create the backing track, which contained some programmed bass and electronic percussion.

On 22 June 1987, Peters then recorded a guide vocal, after which Dave Sharp added some guitar parts, who had not contributed to the song since it was first demoed in April. Sharp recorded one take for the guitar and declined to attempt another one, so Porter took segments of Sharp's best parts and transferred them from one piece of magnetic tape to another.

Peters said that the song was "very symbolic" and "represents the release we found once we realized that material things weren't that important. It's a song about going back home to things you really love." The song's opening line "under the anvil of the sun" were inspired by the 1962 film Lawrence of Arabia, which Peters had seen prior to writing the lyrics. When reflecting on the decision to release "Rain in the Summertime" in the winter rather than summer with the Canadian publication Calgary Herald, Peters commented that "it just goes to show that The Alarm does have a sense of humor". He told Star Hits that the song was for "all seasons". He also believed that the song encapsulated the turbulent conditions that the band endured during the recording sessions for Eye in the Hurricane.

To get to the end of the record and have that song, it felt like we'd weathered a massive storm. We'd come through the eye of the hurricane, and here was the rain at the end of this intense period just to wash away all the ill feeling and bad experiences that we had, to bring us together. The key lines are in the middle: "If I run fast enough I can leave all the pain and the sadness behind." That's really what that song is trying to communicate.

— Mike Peters

== Release ==
Music Week originally announced the release date for "Rain in the Summertime" on 28 September 1987 in the UK, with "Rose Beyond the Wall" as the B-side for the 7-inch single and "Pic Bog Bells of Rhymney" and "Time to Believe" as the B-sides for the 12-inch single. "Bells of Rhymey"was a live recording taken from a 27 July 1987 performance at Cardiff Arms Park.

I.R.S. Records instead released the single on 5 October 1987. A special collectors pack was also issued which contained the 7-inch single, five postcards, and an Alarm sticker. "Rain in the Summertime" debuted at No. 20 on the UK singles chart during the week dated 17 October 1987 and also entered a special singles chart for twelve-inch singles at No. 17. That same week, the song was distributed to radio stations in the United States and was the third most added song to album oriented rock radio stations reporting to Radio & Records. "Rain in the Summertime" ascended to its peak position of No. 18 on the UK Top 75 Singles Chart the following week;<UK Single/> it was also played on 61 percent of album oriented rock stations in the United States reporting to Radio and Records during this time.

For the week dated 24 October 1987, the pan-European Music & Media publication reported that the song was the highest entry on its European Hot 100 singles chart, where it debuted at No. 65. It peaked at No. 63 on that chart the following week and also entered the European Airplay Top 50 at No. 44.

In November, the song crossed over from album oriented rock radio stations to contemporary hit radio. A network of music directors and radio programmers known as Active Industry Research listed the song on its AIR Priorities list, which asked listeners to assess the commercial viability of certain tracks on contemporary hit radio. By December, the song had reached No. 6 on the Billboard Album Rock chart in the United States. During the week of 8 January 1988, the song was receiving airplay from 50 contemporary hit radio stations in the United States, which accounted for 21 percent of all radio stations reporting to Radio & Records in that format.

=== Remix and music video ===
"Rain in the Summertime" received a remix that received spins at night clubs playlists in the United States. The song later reached its peak position of No. 27 on the Billboard Club Play chart, a listing that compiled music "from a national sample of dance club playlists".

A music video was created for the song and received rotation on MTV and Night Tracks. The band had planned to film the music video over the course of two days in Spain, although they were dissatisfied with the surroundings and decided to film the song in a different location after all of the equipment had already been set up. Peters said that "I felt bad about having to make that decision of shutting down the set and reconstructing another one in 24 hours. But the first location just didn't work. I knew that if we came back home with the [first version of the] video, we'd be disappointed."

== Critical reception ==
Music Week felt that the song had "smooth production" and demonstrated "a more subtle approach with their anthemic rock". Music & Media called it a "tuneful"single that showcased the "swirling and committed" style of the Alarm. Billboard wrote that the song "has all the pop appeal of a U2 selection and a surprisingly contemporary dance base." They also labelled the song as a "bright tuneful single" that would "lead the way" for the commercial success of other songs on Eye Of The Hurricane. Cashbox said that the song amounted to "more top-quality 'anthem rock' from The Alarm."

Carter Alan of the WBCN FM radio station in Boston identified "Rain in the Summertime" as having "great crossover potential for rock and top 40" in Billboard's "Outa' The Box" column. Tom Evans of WIYY in Baltimore also highlighted the song in the column, where he called it "one of the catchiest melodies I've heard in a long time". James Muretich quipped that The Alarm "must be the only band that has enjoyed a hit song in the dead of winter called 'Rain in the Summertime'". Whereas Janet Wilkof of The Tampa Tribune was critical of Eye of the Hurricane, she was more complimentary of "Rain in the Summertime", saying that it "starts the album off on the right foot".

== Charts ==
| Chart (1987–1988) | Peak position |
|---|---|
| Canada Top Singles (RPM) | 44 |
| European Hot 100 Singles (Music & Media) | 64 |
| European Airplay (Music & Media) | 28 |
| Ireland (IRMA) | 30 |
| New Zealand (Recorded Music NZ) | 48 |
| UK Singles (Official Charts) | 18 |
| US Hot 100 (Billboard) | 71 |
| US Album Rock Tracks (Billboard) | 6 |
