= The Poppy Fields =

Fictitious teenage group

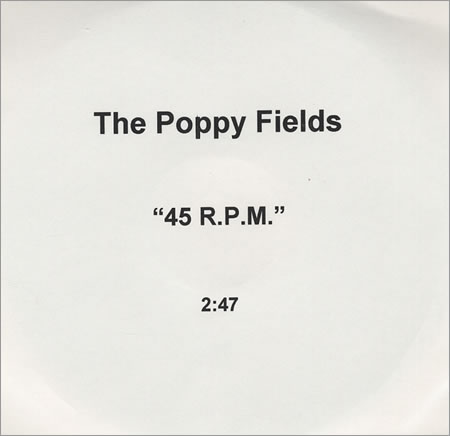
- Promotional release of "45 RPM"

Background information
- Also known as: The Wayriders
- Origin: Wales
- Genres: Pop rock
- Labels: Snapper Music

The Poppy Fields were a fictitious teenage group, invented in 2004 by the Welsh rock band the Alarm. The Poppy Fields scored a hit with the release of "45 RPM" that would become the Alarm's first hit in over a decade. Mike Peters revealed the truth on live radio as Radio 1 was conducting a 2004 broadcast of their then current chart countdown. The story was highlighted by international news outlets with several headlines being published globally.

Immediately after exposing the hoax, the music video for "45 RPM" was replaced by an edited version that included the Alarm's members alongside the hyped members of the Poppy Fields. Peters had enticed a young band called the Wayriders to lip-sync the song for the music video while posing as members of the nonexistent group. The events surrounding this hoax have spawned the cinematic release of Vinyl, its soundtrack, the Alarm Vinyl Tour 2013, and the subsequent announcement of a 2013 tour by the Alarm in support of the soundtrack.

== Hoax ==
In an interview with BBC News Online, Mike Peters said The Alarm were not taken seriously by radio disk jockeys in 2004 because of their outdated image. Peters said, "The Alarm as an entity have been going for 20-odd years and history can go against you – we wanted to break the barrier down." He continued by saying that "[The Alarm members] wanted to stir up the water a little bit, break the mould" and have the song judged on its own merits and musical value, instead of judgement being based on the perception of the band. Peters told The Guardian: "We noticed that a lot of bands suffer when they attempt comebacks because people generally don't believe they can ever be as good as they once were. We wanted to make sure we are judged purely on the strength of the music, and not by our old hairstyles."

=== The Poppy Fields ===
With the Alarm's decision to perpetrate the hoax, Mike Peters gained the cooperation of a group of young musicians from Chester called the Wayriders to lip-sync the Alarm's material and pass it off as their own. The first release by the fictitious band was promoted as a cover of the Alarm's 1983 hit, "68 Guns". In fact it was the Alarm all along, and instead of a cover, it was a re-released version. The demo enticed executives in music production to record an album from the band called In The Poppy Fields which saw its advance release of the single, "45 RPM" entering Britain's top 30 chart. Critical reviews of the band echoed the promoters' official introduction of the band as a tribute to bands like Sex Pistols and the Clash, with even more modern acts like Rancid being compared. The truth of the song's origin was not revealed until after the song entered the charts at number 24, a credit originally earned by the Poppy Fields from unsuspecting patrons who had accepted the act as fresh and new.

== Vinyl ==
Filming for Vinyl began in the Denbighshire resort town of Rhyl in August 2010. Vinyl's soundtrack features new songs by the Alarm specifically composed for the film including the cinematic anthem "Free Rock and Roll", recorded by the Alarm with Vinyl's leading actor Phil Daniels, in a song with the Alarm's lead vocalist and founding member, Mike Peters. The song was released as an EP single on 28 January 2013 in tandem with a national television campaign featuring both the film's cast and members of the Alarm.

== See also ==
- Ageism
