= The Hobbit's Tale =

- Length: 721 km (448 mi)
- Location: Wales
- Designation: Mountain Bike Route
- Trailheads: Cardiff Bay to Caernarfon Castle to Cardiff Bay
- Use: Mountain Bike Endurance Challenge
- Elevation change: 22,300 m (73,200 ft)
- Difficulty: Extreme Endurance
- Website: Hobbit's Tale Homepage

The Hobbit's Tale is a long distance mountain bike route, that is set to be longest ever non-stop offroad ride, awaiting confirmation from Guinness. The Guinness World Record will be for "The greatest distance covered on a mountain bike in 48 hours." The official guidelines are based on flat distance and ignores height gain. It's also suggested by Guinness that it be completed on an athletics track.

The Hobbit's Tale is a solo supported ride through Welsh singletrack and bridleways with some connection sections of road. The route is in total 721 km long (448 miles), 22,300 m of ascent (73,162 feet), and it should take a fit athlete 48–52 hours to complete, with support.

== First route completion ==
On 13 May 2011 Dave Buchanan started and subsequently completed The Hobbit's Tale, followed by a support crew and a photographer from What Mountain Bike Magazine (WMTB); and was subsequently featured in the Summer 2011 WMTB publication.

Buchanan's Guinness World Record attempt was for the greatest distance covered on a mountain bike in 48 hours, the distance he achieved in this time was 567 km (352 mi) with 20,000 m of ascent (65,616 feet), supported by friends from Cardiff; Loco Tuning and his team-mates from Loco BM-Racing.

== Route ==
The Hobbit's Tale route starts in Cardiff Bay, at the Celtic Ring - the start of the Taff Trail. It finishes in the same location, moving northwards along the Taff Trail through Brecon, onto Llyn Brianne, to Machynlleth, Coed-Y-Brenin, Porth Madog, and into Caernarfon by the castle - before heading back along a similar route, deviating to find the best singletrack in each area, for the homeward journey.

Many of the locations for the Hobbit's Tale are remote, with no amenities, so good navigation skills and GPS tracking are required.

== History ==
Dave Buchanan has been a successful 24 hour solo racer since 2004 and has branched out into the creation of cycling legacies for future generations. On 22 March 2009, Dave became the first person to complete the Welsh Coast 2 Coast ride (WC2C). This is a fully unsupported ride (i.e. self-sufficient with water, food, repairs and first aid, this took Dave 22 h 24 min 49 s to finish.

Three other rides have ridden the WC2C non-stop; Rich Holmes was the second rider to complete the WC2C route in a time of 20 h 10 min in May 2010. Steve Heading rode the WC2C in May 2011, after riding from his home in the East Midlands, to Caernarfon and bivvying. He then rode the route with his Bivvy Kit (but didn't stop) to Cardiff. After Bivvying in Cardiff he road home to East Midlands the next day. The ride took him 25 h 35 min from Caernarfon to Cardiff. Amateur endurance cyclist Gary Lake completed the WC2C in August 2012. His attempt was non-stop but supported, and was completed in aid of charity. A combination of bad weather, tough conditions on the ground, and inexperience as a result of attempting his first ultra-distance, point-to-point ride resulted in a time of 35 h 45 min.

There are set of rules developed for riders to follow on the WC2C to help those planning the challenge; the Guidelines for which can be found on the results page next to the WC2C times, these are based on the Colorado Trail Race.

The route has been completed by at least three groups (including one soloist) using the route as a multi-day tour.
