= James Chippendale =

American business executive

- Born: 1969 (age 55–56); United States
- Occupation(s): Business executive, charity founder

James Chippendale (born circa 1969) is an American business executive and anti-leukemia campaigner and co-founder of the charity Love Hope Strength Foundation. He is also founder and CEO of an entertainment and sports insurance broker, CSI Entertainment Insurance, and hosts a television segment in the Dallas, Texas area.

== Insurance career ==
Chippendale attended Arizona State University and worked for almost two years at a general insurance company in Dallas, before founding his own company, CSI Entertainment Insurance. The company became an international entertainment and sports broker, providing insurance coverage for large-scale events and music festivals.

== Love Hope Strength Foundation ==
In 2000, Chippendale was diagnosed with leukemia and could only survive if he found a suitable bone marrow transplant. He found one in Germany, and the operation was successful. As of 2008, he was cancer free.

In 2003, Chippendale founded cancer charity the Love Hope Strength Foundation (LSHF) with fellow survivor Mike Peters. The charity raises funds for cancer treatment, promotes awareness and early detection, and advocates for bone marrow registration by holding rock concerts at remote, elevated venues, including Everest base camp and the top of the Empire State Building.

LHSF concerts feature both amateur and professional musicians. The first four shows had raised almost $1 million by September 2008.

== Film and television career ==
Chippendale hosts a television segment, "Last Call with James Chippendale", on NBC Dallas/Fort Worth. The section features interviews with local celebrities and airs during Sunday night sports show Out of Bounds.

Chippendale is the producer and subject of the documentary More To Live For, directed by Noah Hutton. The film is the story of three lives, all shaken by cancer and dependent upon the one vital bone marrow match that could save them.
