= Morriston Orpheus Choir =

Welsh male voice choir

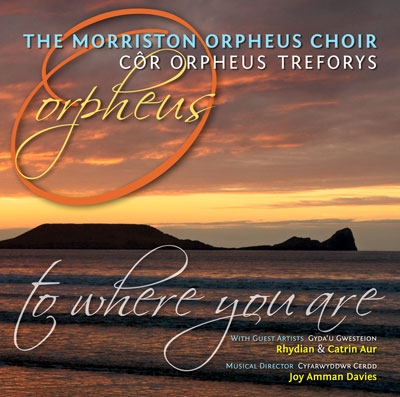
Album cover (2011)

The Morriston Orpheus Choir (Welsh: Côr Orpheus Treforys), based in Morriston, near Swansea, Wales, is a male voice choir, one of the best-known in the UK.

== History ==
The choir was formed on April 23, 1935, by Ivor E. Sims and in its early days concentrated primarily on competitions and local concerts. In 1937, the choir achieved its first success at the Royal National Eisteddfod in Machynlleth, going on to win at the "National" on six further occasions. The choir does not presently sing in competitions, preferring to concentrate on concert performances.

Over the years, successive musical directors have developed and broadened the repertoire. Variety is now the hallmark of the choir's performances, which include arrangements by Alwyn Humphreys M.B.E., musical director from 1979 to January 2005 and now the choir's conductor emeritus. In 2005 the choir appointed its first female musical director, Sian Pearce, to replace Alwyn Humphreys, who had decided to retire after serving the choir since 1979. Sian left the choir in 2007 and Joy Amman Davies, who in 2004 had been made a life member of the choir in recognition of her outstanding contribution and commitment as accompanist, was appointed musical director. After over a decade in the role Joy Amman Davies retired in August 2021, and after a competitive interview and selection process was succeeded by Conal Bembridge-Sayers.

The choir enjoys an international reputation as a leading exponent of male choral singing. Within the United Kingdom the choir is in constant demand with around 25 engagements a year, including concerts, TV and after-dinner performances. The choir regularly undertakes concert tours overseas and in 2004 undertook two tours to Taiwan and to Abu Dhabi and Oman. In April 2007 the choir returned to the UAE, performing in Dubai en route to a concert tour of Australia and New Zealand. In October 2008 the choir visited Geneva to perform a charity concert. During their stay they also visited and sang in the control room of the European Organization for Nuclear Research (CERN).

Highlights of previous overseas tours have included four appearances at British military tattoos and concerts in the former West Berlin, participating at the International Choral Festivals in Nancy, France, and Toronto in Canada, representing Wales at Expo '92 in Seville, Spain, and becoming, in 1996, the first British choir to perform at the International Choral Festival in Bydgoszcz, Poland. The choir has performed in all the major cities of Australia and New Zealand and received standing ovations at their appearances at the world-famous Sydney Opera House. In October 2001, the Independent on Sunday reported that the choir received "five standing ovations" at the Carnegie Hall in New York City. In the spring of 2018 the choir conducted a week-long tour of Vienna and Kraków, singing in St Stephen's Cathedral, Vienna among other venues.

In Wales and the UK the choir has performed in a variety of venues ranging from chapels and village halls to cathedrals and concert halls. It appears regularly in Swansea at the famous Brangwyn Hall in the city centre, as well as the newer Great Hall, at Swansea University's Bay Campus.

The choir features regularly on TV. It has produced over 50 recordings and feature in more than 100 compilation albums. Successful ventures into the "pop" world have included recordings with T'Pau, the Welsh group The Alarm, and most recently Howard Jones.

With 2020 marking the choir's 85th year, a busy schedule of events had been planned, but due to the COVID-19 pandemic, the choir ceased performances and rehearsals for the first time in its history. With assistance from Swansea University however the choir has been able to restart rehearsals online, which has been the subject of features on BBC Radio Wales, BBC Radio 5 Live, BBC Radio Cymru, and BBC Wales Today.

== MOCSA ==
The choir has a long-standing policy of encouraging young Welsh singers through an annual competition organised by the Morriston Orpheus Choir Supporters' Association (MOCSA). The Young Welsh Singer of the Year Competition has been running for over 40 years, and previous winners include Rebecca Evans and Sir Bryn Terfel
