= Raw (The Alarm album) =

Studio album by The Alarm
- Released: 1991
- Recorded: 1990
- Genre: Rock
- Length: 44:11
- Label: IRS
- Producers: The Alarm, Dave Sharp

The Alarm chronology
Standards (1990)	Raw (1991)	Close (2000)

Professional ratings
Review scores
Source	Rating
AllMusic	2/5 stars
The Encyclopedia of Popular Music	2/5 stars
MusicHound Rock: The Essential Album Guide	2/5 stars
The Rolling Stone Album Guide	2.5/5 stars

Raw is the fifth and final studio album released by the original line-up of Welsh rock band The Alarm. The band split up after the album was released. It was released in 1991 on IRS Records.

The album was released on vinyl LP, cassette and CD. It reached number 33 in the UK Albums Chart, and number 161 in the US Billboard 200.

An extended re-mastered version was released, including extra tracks.

== Critical reception ==
MusicHound Rock: The Essential Album Guide called the album "the result of the dreary business of fulfilling contractual obligations."

== Track listing ==
1. "Raw" - (Mike Peters, Dave Sharp, Eddie MacDonald, Nigel Twist) - 4:28
2. "Rockin' in the Free World" - (Neil Young) - 3:59
3. "God Save Somebody" - (Sharp, Twist) - 4:09
4. "Moments in Time" - (Peters, MacDonald) - 5:42
5. "Hell or High Water" - (Peters, MacDonald) - 3:47
6. "Lead Me Through the Darkness" - (Peters, MacDonald) - 4:34
7. "The Wind Blows Away My Words" - (Peters, Sharp, MacDonald, Twist) - 4:32
8. "Let the River Run Its Course" - (Peters, Sharp, MacDonald, Twist) - 3:53
9. "Save Your Crying" - (Sharp, Twist) - 4:38
10. "Wonderful World" - (Sharp, Twist) - 5:00

== Single releases ==
"Raw" was released before the album, reaching number 51 in the UK Singles Chart. It was the only single to be released off the album

== Personnel ==
The Alarm

- Mike Peters - lead vocals, acoustic guitar, harmonica
- Dave Sharp - lead guitar, backing vocals, harmonica; lead vocals (tracks 3, 9, 10)
- Eddie MacDonald - bass, backing vocals, keyboards
- Nigel Twist - drums, backing vocals, percussion

Technical personnel

- Rob Storm - engineer, additional keyboards
- Mark Pythian - engineer
- Ian McFarlane - assistant engineer
- Danny Griffiths - additional engineer
- Dave Buchanan - additional engineer
- Keith Andrew - additional engineer
- Keith Hartley - additional engineer

== Welsh release ==
An edition of the album sung in Welsh called Tân was released.

1. "Y Ffordd (The Road)" - 3:46
2. "Y Gwynt Sy'n Chwythu 'Ngeiriau" - 4:32
3. "Eiliadau Fel Hyn" - 5:18
4. "Rocio Yn Ein Rhyddid (Rocking in the Free World)" - 4:43
5. "Tân" - 4:33
6. "Dyfnach Na'r Dyfroedd" - 3:48
7. "Tywys Fi Drwy'r Tywyllwch" - 4:34
8. "Fel Mae'r Afon" - 4:30
9. "Crynu Dan Fy Nhraed" - 4:38
10. "Nadolig Llawen (Happy Xmas (War Is Over))" - 3:40

== Japanese release ==
A Japanese promotional sample 10-track CD album was issued to radio stations in advance of release. It contained a custom promo stamped disc, stickered picture sleeve complete with lyrics and obi-strip

== Remastered release ==
Released in 2000, the remastered edition featured a revised track listings, B-sides and previously unreleased recordings, new and original artwork, unseen photos, lyrics, sleeve notes by Mike Peters and interactive programming information to play the album in its original form.

Track listing:

1. "The Road" - 3:46
2. "Rockin' in the Free World" - 4:42
3. "Raw" - 4:28
4. "The Wind Blows Away My Words" - 4:31
5. "Unsafe Building (1990)" - 4:50
6. "God Save Somebody" - 4:10
7. "Moments in Time" - 5:43
8. "Let the River Run Its Course" - 4:29
9. "Lead Me Through the Darkness" - 4:34
10. "Hell or High Water" - 3:48
11. "Wonderful World" - 5:01
12. "Save Your Crying" - 4:38
13. "Up for Murder (1990)" - 2:57
14. "Happy Xmas (War Is Over)" - 3:44
15. "Walk Forever by My Side" - 4:10

== 2004 promotional release ==
EMI, after taking over from IRS, released the complete Alarm back catalogue on CD.
