= 45 RPM (song) =

Single by The Poppy Fields (The Alarm)

from the album In The Poppy Fields
- B-side: "Statue of Liberty"
- Released: 2004
- Recorded: 2004
- Genre: Pop rock
- Length: 3:10
- Label: Snapper Music
- Songwriters: Mike Peters, Steve Grantley
- Producer: Steve Brown

The Poppy Fields (The Alarm) singles chronology
"'"Raw"'" (1991)	"45 RPM" (2004)	"New Home New Life" (2004)

"45 RPM" is a song written by Mike Peters and Steve Grantley. The song was the first official release by the Alarm since 1991, although it was originally credited as a recording by the Poppy Fields. The single was released on 7-inch vinyl and two CD editions and was billed as an advance release from the album In the Poppy Fields.

The song reached No. 28 on the UK Singles Chart and No. 6 on the UK Independent Singles Chart in 2004.

== Pseudonym ==
The single was released under the pseudonym band name the Poppy Fields in 2004 with an accompanying video. BBC Radio 1 DJs such as Mark and Lard and Steve Lamacq were taken in by the stunt. Music reviewers were raving about the Poppy Fields based on them being a bunch of punky teenagers. Record company executives desperately wanted to find out more about the unheard band.

Lead singer Mike Peters explained the decision to market the song under the Poppy Fields:

"We thought we had nothing to lose. If we had put out a single by The Alarm, there would have been a negative feeling, because whether record company executives and music journalists admit it or not image is rated far higher than the music' nowadays.

"I hope we've proved a valid point. Why must new music necessarily have to be made by new bands. I'm 44 but I'm writing new songs as fresh and as vibrant as anything I've ever done. In Britain we're too quick to want to find the next big thing. If you're over 35 you're dismissed as over-the-hill.

== Track listing ==
All songs written by Mike Peters unless otherwise indicated.

45 RPM CD1 release.

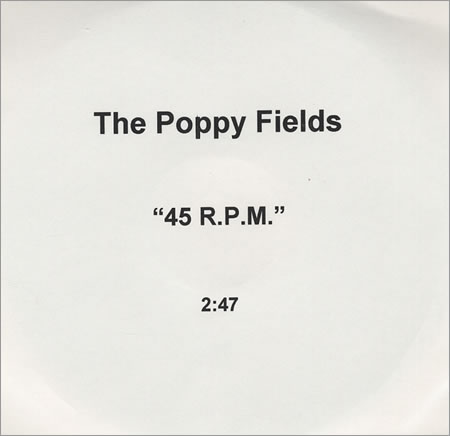
A promotional CD was released with one track only

=== UK 7" single ===
1. "45 RPM" (Peters/Grantley) - 2:47
2. "It's Not Unusual" (Reed/Mills)

=== UK CD maxi-single 1 ===
1. "45 RPM (edit)" (Peters/Grantley) - 2:59
2. "Contientious Objector" - 4:09
3. "68 Guns (Live Session Nov 4, 2003)" - 4:53

=== UK CD maxi-single 2 ===
1. "45 RPM (album version)" (Peters/Grantley) - 3:10
2. "Spirit of '76 (Live Session Nov 4, 2003)" - 7:10
3. "Statue of Liberty" - 5:52

== Credits ==
- Bass, backing vocals - Craig Adams
- Drums, percussion, backing vocals - Steve Grantley
- Guitar [6 & 12 string], backing vocals - James Stevenson
- Vocals, guitar, harmonica - Mike Peters
- Artwork - Karl Parsons

Recorded at Foel Studios, Llanfair Caereinion, Wales.
