= Sixty Eight Guns =

Single by The Alarm

from the album Declaration
- B-side: "68 Guns Part II"
- Released: 16 September 1983 (UK)
- Recorded: 1983
- Studio: Good Earth Studios
- Genre: Alternative rock, new wave
- Length: 3:15
- Label: I.R.S.
- Songwriters: Mike Peters, Eddie MacDonald
- Producer: Alan Shacklock

The Alarm singles chronology
"The Stand" (1983)	"Sixty Eight Guns" (1983)	"Where Were You Hiding? (When the Storm Broke)" (1984)

"Sixty Eight Guns" (or written as "68 Guns") is a song by Welsh rock band the Alarm. In the UK, it was released as a single in September 1983. The song later appeared on the group's debut album Declaration in February 1984. It was written by Alarm members Mike Peters and Eddie MacDonald.

== Background ==
The lyrics to "Sixty Eight Guns" were inspired by a book that Peters had read about the 1960s street gangs of Glasgow. The song's title is written as "Sixty Eight Guns" and "68 Guns" interchangeably on the various I.R.S. releases. The back cover of Declaration and the front cover of the 7" single show the title as "Sixty Eight Guns" while the labels on the discs themselves show the title as "68 Guns". "Sixty Eight Guns" was recorded at Good Earth Studios and mixed at Abbey Road Studios.

Jay Boberg, who at the time served as the executive vice president of I.R.S. Records, stated that he expected "to take "68 Guns" right to Top 40 radio." The song reached No. 17 on the UK Singles Chart, becoming the Alarm's first top 40 appearance and their highest-ever position on that chart. The song also reached No. 39 on the Hot Mainstream Rock Tracks chart in the United States, the Alarm's first-ever chart position in that country. Soon after, it "bubbled under" the Billboard Hot 100 singles chart at No. 106, becoming the band's first charting single on the American pop chart.

== Track listings ==
All songs written by Mike Peters and Eddie MacDonald.

=== UK 7" single ===
1. "68 Guns" - 3:15
2. "68 Guns Part II" - 3:25

=== UK 12" single ===
1. "68 Guns (Full Version)" - 5:45
2. "Thoughts of a Young Man" - 2:50

== Credits ==
- Vocals – Mike Peters
- Guitars – Dave Sharp, Mike Peters
- Bass – Eddie MacDonald
- Drums – Nigel Twist
- Keyboards – Ian Kewley
- Piano– Alan Shacklock
- Trumpet – Arthur Fairlie
- Single cover – Harry Murlowski

== Charts ==
Chart (1983–1984)	Peak position
UK Singles Chart	17
U.S. Billboard Bubbling Under Hot 100 Singles	106
U.S. Billboard Top Rock Tracks	39

== Other releases ==
The song appeared on several other Alarm releases:

- As a live track on the maxi-version of the single "Spirit of '76".
- As a live studio version on the "45 RPM" hoax single released by the Alarm under the name of the Poppy Fields.
- As a live track on Peters' solo Live (From a Broadcast) album. It includes an additional verse that was dropped during the early stages of writing.
