= Dave Sharp =

British guitarist (born 1959)

- Born: 28 January 1959 (age 67)
- Origin: Salford, England
- Genres: Rock, punk rock, new wave
- Instruments: Guitar, vocals, harmonica
- Years active: 1981–present
- Website: Official website

Dave Sharp (born 28 January 1959) is an English guitarist who co-founded, along with Mike Peters, the Welsh punk/new wave band the Alarm.

== Early career ==
Sharp was born in Kersal, Salford, Lancashire, and began playing with the band Seventeen in the 1970s; he made his recording debut on their "Don't Let Go" / "Bank Holiday Weekend" single. After Seventeen disbanded in 1980, the band reformed as the Alarm, eventually recording hit records such as "Sixty Eight Guns" and "The Spirit of '76".

== Hard Travelers ==
Towards the end of 2007, Sharp, having spent most of his recent time playing solo acoustic, was ready to form a new band. He was put in touch with Henry McCullough and the nucleus of The Hard Travelers was formed. The concept of the band's music was intended to bring the songs of Woody Guthrie to a new public. To complete the lineup, Sharp and McCullough brought in Zoot Money on keyboards; Gary Fletcher on bass; and Colin Allen on drums.

Their debut gig was on 22 January 2008, at The Cellars in Portsmouth. The following gigs had to be postponed due to various difficulties and their next performance was scheduled for The Black Horse Festival, Hastings where they headlined on 24 May 2008.

Sharp went on to form another lineup for the band, featuring guitarist Scott Poley, Norman Cooke (Drums), Christian Madden (Hammond Organ), and Paul Sudlow (Acoustic Guitar). After only a short time in the studio, the lineup disbanded.

== AOR – The Spirit of The Alarm ==
In April 2008, Sharp launched his own version of the Alarm, AOR – Spirit of The Alarm, to showcase the band's American setlists from the late 1980s. Together with North West musicians, Wayne Parry, Dave Black, Tom Szakaly, and Si Smith, AOR played their debut gig at Glasgow Rockers on 18 April, later supporting the Damned at Heywood Civic Centre in support of the Sophie Lancaster Foundation on 26 November 2008.

Sharp currently tours the United Kingdom with regular visits to Scotland and Wales. Sharp has also played regular support slots for The Alarm including the 2017 Viral Black tour.

== Discography ==
Solo albums

- Hard Travellin' (1991)
- Downtown America (1996)
