= Mike Peters (musician) =

Welsh musician (1959–2025)

Mike Peters MBE DL
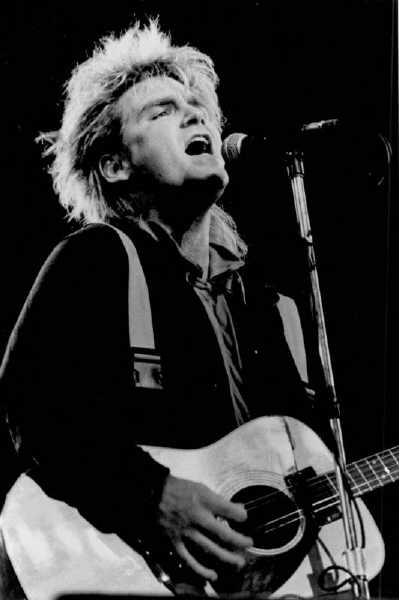
- Peters performing live in 1984

Background information
- Born: Michael Leslie Peters; 25 February 1959; Prestatyn, Wales
- Origin: Rhyl, Wales
- Died: 29 April 2025 (aged 66) Dyserth, Wales
- Genres: Alternative rock; new wave; post-punk
- Occupations: Musician; songwriter
- Instruments: Vocals; guitar
- Years active: 1975–2025
- Labels: Crai; Eagle Rock Entertainment; 21st Century
- Formerly of: The Alarm; Dead Men Walking; The Jack Tars; Big Country; Coloursound; Hairy Hippie; The Toilets; Seventeen
- Mike Peters' voice on politics and emotions

Michael Leslie Peters MBE DL (25 February 1959 – 29 April 2025) was a Welsh musician, best known as the lead vocalist of the Alarm. After the band broke up in 1991, Peters wrote and released solo work, before revamping the Alarm in 2000.

Additionally, he was co-founder of the Love Hope Strength Foundation. Between 2011 and 2013, Peters was the lead vocalist for Big Country as well as the Alarm. He was appointed a Member of the Most Excellent Order of the British Empire (MBE) in the 2019 New Year Honours for services to cancer care.

== Early life ==
Peters was born at Chatsworth House in Prestatyn, Denbighshire in North Wales, on 25 February 1959, and grew up living at the Crescent Hotel on Edward Henry Street, Rhyl, with former The Alarm band member Eddie MacDonald. The name of the street became the inspiration for a track on the album of the same name, released as part of The Poppyfields Bond of albums. On "Edward Henry Street", Peters describes his life growing up in Wales.

Peters' first job was a computer operator for Kwik Save. He worked on an old IBM System/3 mainframe.

== Musical career ==
=== 1970s ===
Peters' musical debut was on 10 October 1975, when he fronted Hairy Hippie (named by the disc jockey James Alexander Barr), a band formed with his schoolmates to perform at his sister's 21st birthday party at the Talardy Hotel in St Asaph. The first song performed that night was a cover version of "If You Think You Know How to Love Me" by Smokie.

His first proper band was the Toilets, formed after he saw the Sex Pistols play at Chester in 1976. The first song the Toilets played live was "Nothing to Do" at the Palace Hotel in Rhyl.

Peters, along with MacDonald, Dave Sharp and Nigel Twist (then called Nigel Buckle), formed a band called Seventeen in 1978. The first song Seventeen played was "Pop Generation" at the Bee (now Station) Hotel in Rhyl on 27 May 1978. One single was released in 1979 on the Vendetta label titled "Don't Let Go".

=== 1980s ===
In 1981, the Alarm was formed and they moved to London to tour the club circuit. They were signed by the IRS label. The band took their name from a song named Alarm Alarm, that was one of the first songs written by Peters for the Toilets. On BBC Radio 1, John Peel commented that with Duran Duran, Talk Talk and now Alarm Alarm perhaps he should call himself John Peel John Peel, so the name was shortened to the Alarm.

The Alarm played their first gig in the Victoria Hotel in Prestatyn on 10 June 1981. "Shout to the Devil" was the first song to be played. Peters wrote the song that day and as it suited the three acoustics and drumkit line-up, the band used to rehearse it during the soundcheck. Their first single on their own label, "Unsafe Building", was released in November 1981.

=== 1990s ===
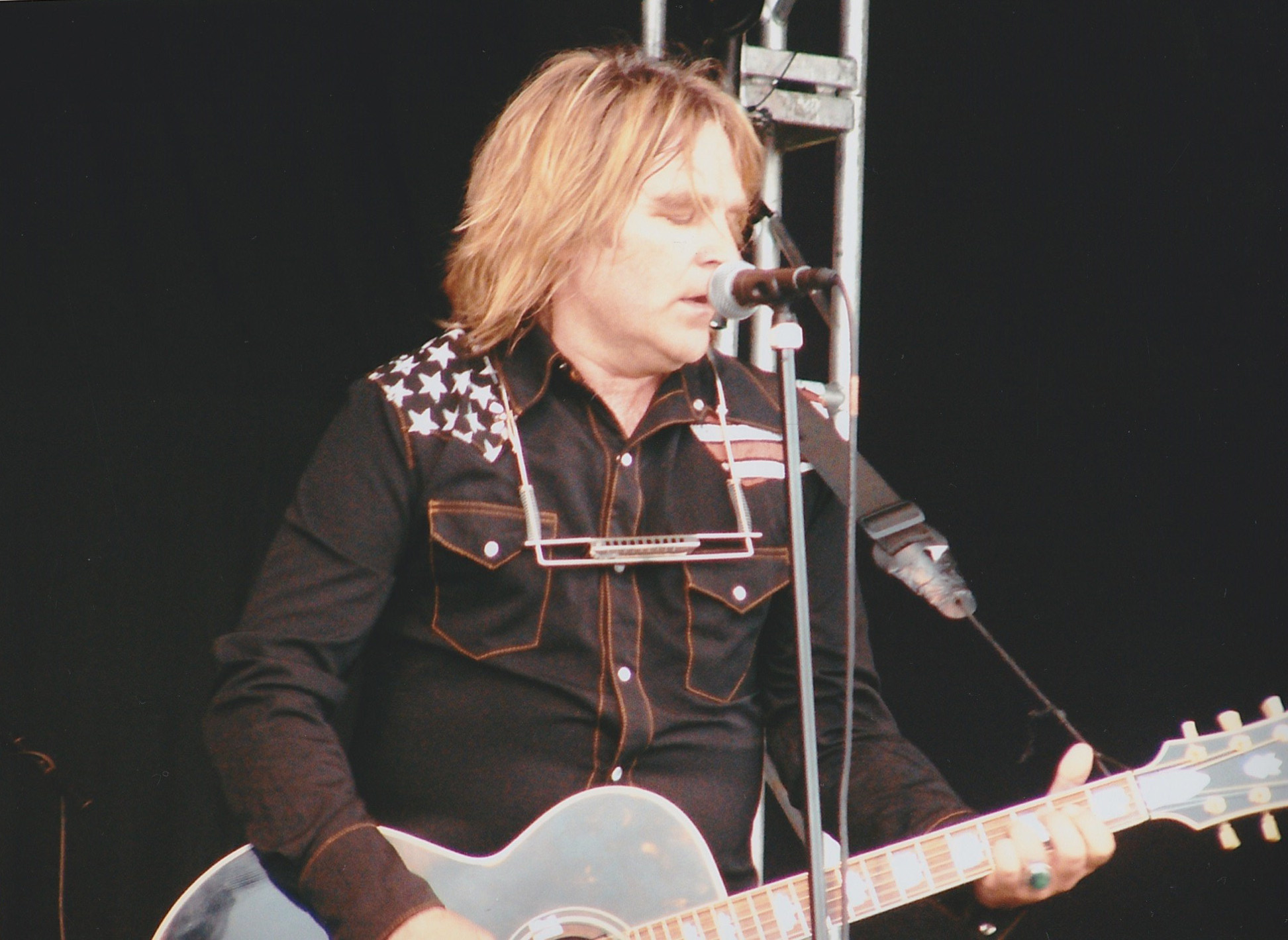
Peters performing with the Alarm in 2004

In 1991 the Alarm broke up after Peters left the band on stage at the Brixton Academy.

MPO (Mike Peters Organisation) was formed in 1992 as Peters used the internet to communicate with his fan base.

The original members of the Alarm have only reunited once. This was for the VH1 series Bands Reunited on 28 October 2003.

Two singles were released in 1994. "Back into the System", which also included a Welsh release of the single. This was followed by "It Just Don't Get Any Better Than This". Peters teamed up with the Poets for both records. The single also included a first release of the track "White Noise" which Peters re-recorded for the album Rise. The American release also included a re-mix.

It would be a further year before Peters released his first solo album venture Breathe. The CD version of the album did not contain Peters' first two solo singles. An acoustic-only version of the same album was also released. By now, Peters had retreated into the internet and had his own website, where most of his future releases would be sold.

After having been diagnosed with cancer in 1995, Peters released his second solo venture Feel Free. The album included a take on Grandmaster Flash's influential old-school hip-hop track "The Message". The American release of Feel Free also included a special hidden track called "Gone Elvis".

In 1998, Rise was released, to a wider audience this time. Rise was a change of musical direction for Peters. "White Noise Part II" found Peters experimenting with studio sound manipulation and drum machines, whereas "My Calling" featured Peters' signature acoustic/electric roots-rock sound. The album also featured the song "In Circles", which Peters co-wrote with Cult guitarist Billy Duffy.

Peters followed up the release of Rise by touring the U.S. under "The Interactive Acoustic Works U.S. Tour", which started in Boston on 10 October 1998. That year also saw the release of the album Live (From a Broadcast). This set included a version of the Alarm's best known song, "68 Guns", which reinstated an extra verse that the band had trimmed out early in the writing process.

In 1999 Peters again worked with Billy Duffy, forming a band called Coloursound with Duffy, Duffy's former Cult bandmate Scott Garret, and Craig Adams (formerly of the Mission). They recorded one eponymous studio album.

From 1993 onwards, Peters held an annual weekend event called "The Gathering" at Llandudno. It was attended by various guest musicians, including former Alarm band members.

=== 2000–2025 ===
The new millennium saw Peters release Flesh and Blood, based on the stage play of the same name written by Helen Griffin.

In 2000, Peters decided to reuse the Alarm brand name. After he left the band in 1991, Peters had signed over rights to the name to the other band members. This caused former drummer Nigel Twist to threaten to sue. Peters thereafter used the Alarm brand name, sometimes with added Roman numerals for the year.

In 2001, Peters went on the road again as part of supergroup Dead Men Walking. Featuring Pete Wylie (of the Mighty Wah!), Glen Matlock (former Sex Pistols), Captain Sensible (the Damned), and Kirk Brandon (Spear of Destiny), the band played a mixture of old and new material spanning their combined careers.

In 2004, Peters released the single "45 RPM" using the pseudonym the Poppy Fields, using the guise that this band was a teenage band based from Chester; this hoax was the source of the subject of the film Vinyl. Peters came eleventh in an online poll to find 100 Welsh Heroes.

He joined members of the Mescaleros in 2010 to perform songs of Joe Strummer under the name Los Mondo Bongo.

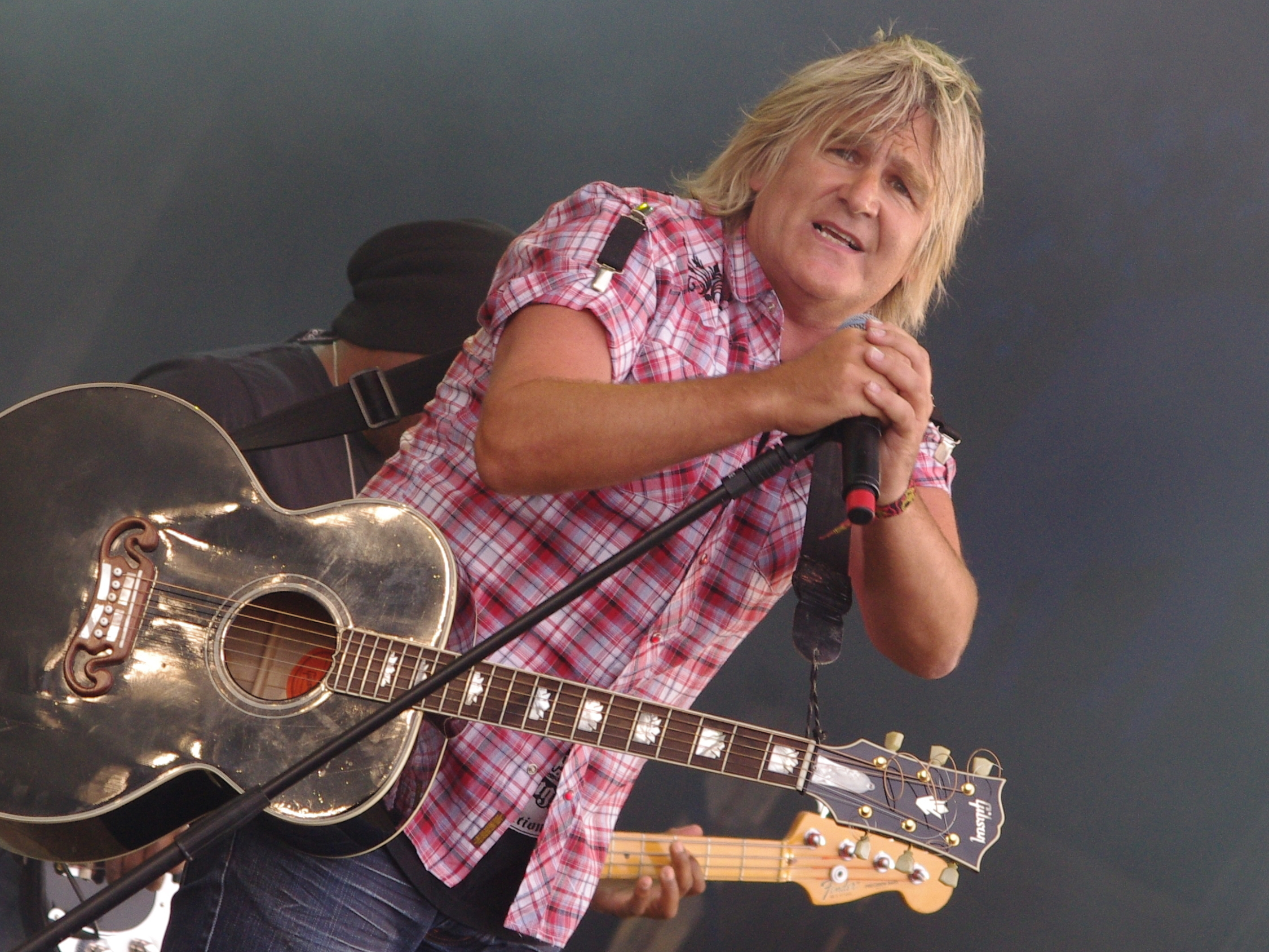
Peters fronting Big Country in 2012

In 2011, Peters joined Big Country for their UK tour and released a single with the band that August, titled "Another Country", followed in April 2013 by the album The Journey. On 9 November 2013, it was announced via the Big Country Facebook page that Peters had departed the band.

== Musical influences ==
Peters stated various artists had had an influence on his musical direction. In "Edward Henry Street" of the album with the same name, Peters sings "bought Aladdin Sane from Greaves Records" in reference to the album by David Bowie.

Woody Guthrie was also an influence.

== Personal life ==
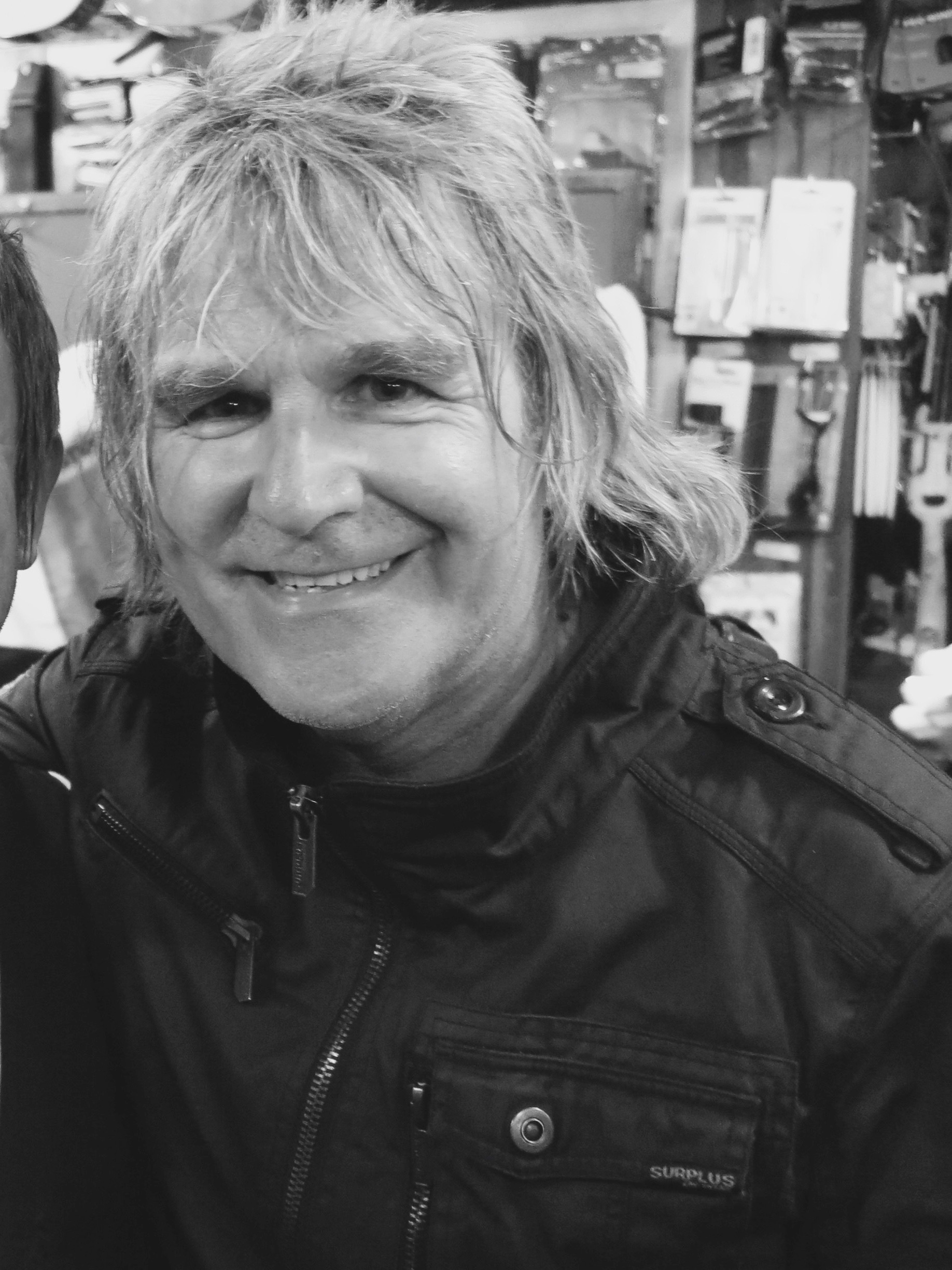
Peters in 2013

In 1986, in the middle of the height of the fame of the Alarm, whilst based in London during the week, Peters was still living with his parents in Rhyl. Having hitch-hiked home one weekend, he met his future wife, Jules, then an undergraduate student at Bangor University studying English. The couple were engaged two weeks later, and had two sons, both conceived through IVF. The family lived in Dyserth, North Wales.

He was a regular member of the running group the NightCrawlers, who run every Thursday night around various locations in the North East Wales area.

Peters was appointed Deputy Lieutenant of Clwyd in December 2008. He was appointed Member of the Order of the British Empire (MBE) in the 2019 New Year Honours for services to cancer care.

=== Illness and death ===
Peters had cancer for three decades; he was first diagnosed with lymphoma in 1995. In 1996, Peters made a recovery from lymph cancer, and began recording and touring again, sometimes with members of the re-formed band. He also presented a regular show called Bedrock on BBC Radio Wales. In 2005, he discovered that he was suffering from chronic lymphocytic leukaemia. At this time, he co-founded the Love Hope Strength Foundation with fellow leukaemia patient James Chippendale. After going into remission he appeared in a documentary for BBC Wales chronicling his illness, released in 2006 as Mike Peters on the Road to Recovery, with some of the proceeds being donated to his foundation.

In October 2007, Peters and 38 other musicians, cancer survivors and supporters, made a 14-day trek to the Mount Everest base camp to perform the highest concert ever on land to raise awareness and money to fight cancer. Other musicians included Cy Curnin and Jamie West-Oram of the Fixx, Glenn Tilbrook of Squeeze, Slim Jim Phantom of the Stray Cats and Nick Harper. In 2011, Love Hope Strength Foundation released the film More to Live For, intended to promote the importance of bone marrow donation in saving the lives of cancer victims.

In September 2022, he announced that his chronic lymphocytic leukaemia had returned, and he was being treated with chemotherapy at the North Wales Cancer Centre.

In September 2024, Peters was reported to be in remission from Richter's Syndrome following a clinical trial at the Christie NHS Foundation Trust, Manchester. In December 2024, he reported that he had not been able to achieve complete remission and undertook chimeric antigen receptor T-cell therapy in early 2025.

Peters died from the illness on 29 April 2025, at the age of 66. His funeral was held on 29 May 2025 in his hometown of Dyserth. A musical tribute was screened in Peters' honour in the village square, before the funeral service was held the Parish Church of St Bridget and St Cwyfan. The service was attended by 150 invited guests, with around 2,000 fans watching outside the church on a large screen.

== Discography ==
=== Albums ===
Title	Release date
Breathe	1 January 1995
Breathe – The Acoustic Sessions	1 January 1995
Second Generation Volume 1	1 January 1996
Feel Free	5 August 1996
Abbey Road Sessions	1 March 1997
Rise	26 February 1998
Acoustic Works 1981–1986	5 November 1998
Acoustic Works 1987–1991	5 November 1998
Live (From a Broadcast)	1998
Rise Demos	1 May 1999
Flesh & Blood	19 February 2000
The Millenium Gathering	1 February 2001
Collected Works	17 September 2001
The Alarmstock Collection Live	1 September 2003
Mike Peters in Session 2007	2007
Mike Peters in Session 2008	2008
Breathe – Expanded Edition	2008
Acoustic Live	2009
Feel Free – Remastered and Expanded	2009
Mike Peters in Session 2009	2009

=== Singles ===
Title	Other tracks	Release date
"Back into the System"	"A New Chapter", "21st Century (demo version)", "Back into the System"	1994
"Nol I Mewn I'r System"	"Y Bennod Newy", "Canrif 21 – Fersiwn Demo", "Nol I Mewn I'r System"	1994
"It Just Don't Get Any Better Than This"	"Devil's Word", "White Noise"	1994
"Shine On"	"113th Dream", "Safe European Home", "Going Underground"	1996

=== Promotional recordings ===
Title	Songs	Album	Release date
Breathe Promo	"Levis and Bibles", "Love Is a Revolution", "Spiritual", "If I Can't Have You", "Breathe"	Breathe	1994
Mike Peters EP	"Transcendental", "Your Are to Me", "Gone Elvis", "I Want You", "Shine On"	Feel Free	1996
Regeneration	"Regeneration"	Feel Free	1996
Mike Peters Sampler	"Transcendental" (radio edit), "Sold Me Down the River", "Rain in the Summertime", "Rescue Me", "Interview with Mike Peters"	Rise	1998

== Filmography ==
=== Videos ===
Title	Release date
Videozine Volume 1	1997
Flesh and Blood Recording Sessions	1999
Alarm 2000 Day Documentary	2000
The Song That Changed My Life	2013

=== DVDS ===
Title	Release date
The Story of the Alarm	2001
The Gathering DVD Box Set Collection	4 December 2004
Mike Peters – The Documentary – On the Road to Recovery	2006
The Gathering Electric MMVI	2006
The Gathering Acoustic MMVI	2006
Alarmcast #1	2006
