= FatKat (investment software) =

Investment software

- Type: Private
- Founded: 1999
- Founder: Raymond C. Kurzweil
- Headquarters: Wellesley Hills, MA, United States
- Website: fatkat.com

FatKat, Inc. is a privately held company founded in 1999 by Raymond C. Kurzweil, an author, inventor, and futurist. He's perhaps best known for creating an optical character recognition system that – in conjunction with a flatbed scanner and text-to-speech synthesizer – reads text aloud to the sight-impaired. FatKat is an acronym derived from "financial accelerating transactions from Kurzweil Adaptive Technologies". The aforesaid company is one of a total of nine Kurzweil companies.

The purpose of FatKat as listed with the Massachusetts Secretary of the Commonwealth Corporations Division is "investment software". Kurzweil, who specializes in artificial intelligence coupled with pattern recognition, has created software that uses quantitative methods to pick stocks for investment purposes.

Although selecting stocks based on software-generated recommendations is not new, FatKat's approach was unique at the time because of its "nonlinear decision making processes more akin to how a brain operates". The software can evolve by creating different rules, letting them compete, and using (or combining) the best outcomes. After FatKat's inception, other investment and/or software companies rushed to develop software based on this and similar Darwinist evolutionary principles, using genetic algorithms.

In 2005, Kurzweil reported that the FatKat software was "doing very well – 50% to 100% returns for the last two years". But as of December 2008, FatKat does not offer its software for sale.

== Corporate structure ==
FatKat was registered as a foreign corporation in 1999 with the Massachusetts Secretary of the Commonwealth, Corporations Division. It was originally formed as a company in the state of Delaware. Ray Kurzweil is the president of FatKat, with Aaron Kleiner serving as treasurer and secretary. Michael Brown is listed as a director.

== Related hedge funds ==
Two hedge funds exist that use the FatKat name: FatKat Investment Fund, LP and FatKat QP Investment Fund, LP. Both of these investment fund companies list Kurzweil Capital Partners LLC as a general partner. These companies were formed in December 2005, also in Delaware. Neither of the hedge funds is publicly traded. Kurzweil Capital Partners LLC and the two hedge funds are not listed on the Kurzweil companies' web site.

== Investors ==
Documented investors in FatKat, Inc. and its hedge funds are venture capitalist Vinod Khosla and Michael W. Brown (former CFO of Microsoft and chairman of NASDAQ). Other investors have not been disclosed.
