= Accelerating change =

Increase in the rate of technological change through history

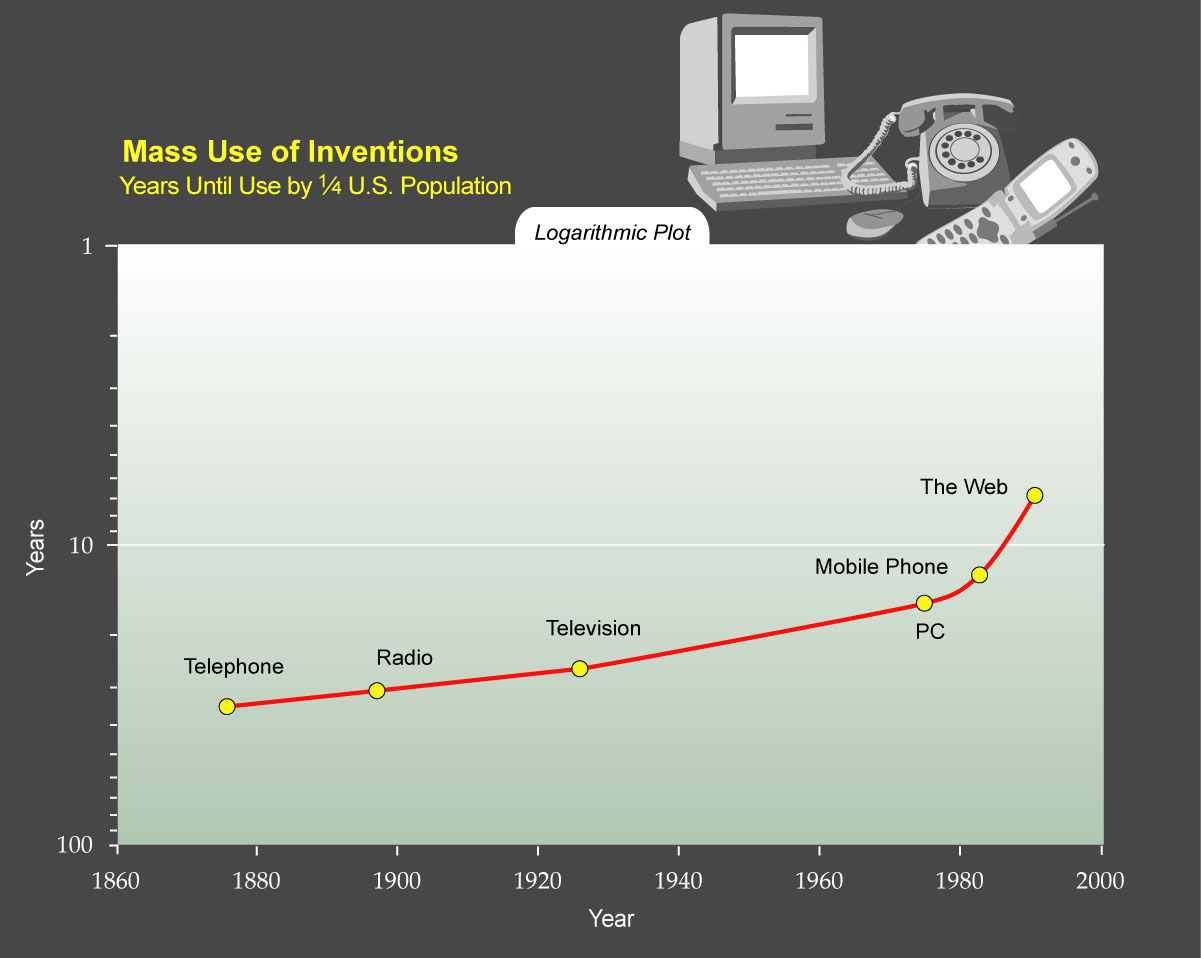
Mass use of inventions: Years until use by a quarter of US population

In futures studies and the history of technology, accelerating change is the observed exponential nature of the rate of technological change in recent history, which may suggest faster and more profound change in the future and may or may not be accompanied by equally profound social and cultural change.

== Early observations ==
In 1910, during the town planning conference of London, Daniel Burnham noted, "But it is not merely in the number of facts or sorts of knowledge that progress lies: it is still more in the geometric ratio of sophistication, in the geometric widening of the sphere of knowledge, which every year is taking in a larger percentage of people as time goes on." And later on, "It is the argument with which I began, that a mighty change having come about in fifty years, and our pace of development having immensely accelerated, our sons and grandsons are going to demand and get results that would stagger us."

In 1938, Buckminster Fuller introduced the word ephemeralization to describe the trends of "doing more with less" in chemistry, health and other areas of industrial development. In 1946, Fuller published a chart of the discoveries of the chemical elements over time to highlight the development of accelerating acceleration in human knowledge acquisition.

By mid-century, for Arnold J. Toynbee it was "not an article of faith" but "a datum of observation and experience history" that history was accelerating, and "at an accelerating rate".

In 1958, Stanislaw Ulam wrote in reference to a conversation with John von Neumann:

One conversation centered on the ever accelerating progress of technology and changes in the mode of human life, which gives the appearance of approaching some essential singularity in the history of the race beyond which human affairs, as we know them, could not continue.

== Moravec's Mind Children ==
In a series of published articles from 1974 to 1979, and then in his 1988 book Mind Children, computer scientist and futurist Hans Moravec generalized Moore's law to make predictions about the future of artificial life. Moore's law describes an exponential growth pattern in the complexity of integrated semiconductor circuits. Moravec extended this to include technologies from long before the integrated circuit to future forms of technology. Moravec outlined a timeline and a scenario in which robots could evolve into a new series of artificial species, starting around 2030–2040.

== James Burke's Connections ==
In his TV series Connections (1978)—and sequels Connections^{2} (1994) and Connections^{3} (1997)—James Burke explores an "Alternative View of Change" (the subtitle of the series) that rejects the conventional linear and teleological view of historical progress. Burke contends that one cannot consider the development of any particular piece of the modern world in isolation. Rather, the entire gestalt of the modern world is the result of a web of interconnected events, each one consisting of a person or group acting for reasons of their own motivations (e.g., profit, curiosity, religious) with no concept of the final, modern result to which the actions of either them or their contemporaries would lead. The interplay of the results of these isolated events is what drives history and innovation, and is also the main focus of the series and its sequels.

Burke also explores three corollaries to his initial thesis. The first is that, if history is driven by individuals who act only on what they know at the time, and not because of any idea as to where their actions will eventually lead, then predicting the future course of technological progress is merely conjecture. Therefore, if we are astonished by the connections Burke is able to weave among past events, then we will be equally surprised to what the events of today eventually will lead, especially events we were not even aware of at the time.

The second and third corollaries are explored most in the introductory and concluding episodes, and they represent the downside of an interconnected history. If history progresses because of the synergistic interaction of past events and innovations, then as history does progress, the number of these events and innovations increases. This increase in possible connections causes the process of innovation to not only continue, but to accelerate. Burke poses the question of what happens when this rate of innovation, or more importantly change itself, becomes too much for the average person to handle, and what this means for individual power, liberty, and privacy.

== Gerald Hawkins's Mindsteps ==
In his book Mindsteps to the Cosmos (HarperCollins, August 1983), Gerald S. Hawkins elucidated his notion of mindsteps, dramatic and irreversible changes to paradigms or world views. He identified five distinct mindsteps in human history, and the technology that accompanied these "new world views": the invention of imagery, writing, mathematics, printing, the telescope, rocket, radio, TV, computer... "Each one takes the collective mind closer to reality, one stage further along in its understanding of the relation of humans to the cosmos." He noted: "The waiting period between the mindsteps is getting shorter. One can't help noticing the acceleration." Hawkins' empirical 'mindstep equation' quantified this, and gave dates for future mindsteps. The date of the next mindstep (5; the series begins at 0) is given as 2021, with two further, successively closer mindsteps in 2045 and 2051, until the limit of the series in 2053. His speculations ventured beyond the technological:

The mindsteps... appear to have certain things in common—a new and unfolding human perspective, related inventions in the area of memes and communications, and a long formulative waiting period before the next mindstep comes along. None of the mindsteps can be said to have been truly anticipated, and most were resisted at the early stages. In looking to the future we may equally be caught unawares. We may have to grapple with the presently inconceivable, with mind-stretching discoveries and concepts.

== Vinge's exponentially accelerating change ==
The mathematician Vernor Vinge popularized his ideas about exponentially accelerating technological change in the science fiction novel Marooned in Realtime (1986), set in a world of rapidly accelerating progress leading to the emergence of more and more sophisticated technologies separated by shorter and shorter time intervals, until a point beyond human comprehension is reached. His subsequent Hugo award-winning novel A Fire Upon the Deep (1992) starts with an imaginative description of the evolution of a superintelligence passing through exponentially accelerating developmental stages ending in a transcendent, almost omnipotent power unfathomable by mere humans. His already mentioned influential 1993 paper on the technological singularity compactly summarizes the basic ideas.

== Kurzweil's The Law of Accelerating Returns ==
In his 1999 book The Age of Spiritual Machines, Ray Kurzweil proposed The Law of Accelerating Returns, according to which the rate of change in a wide variety of evolutionary systems (including but not limited to the growth of technologies) tends to increase exponentially. He gave further focus to this issue in a 2001 essay entitled "The Law of Accelerating Returns". In it, Kurzweil, after Moravec, argued for extending Moore's Law to describe exponential growth of diverse forms of technological progress. Whenever a technology approaches some kind of a barrier, according to Kurzweil, a new technology will be invented to allow us to cross that barrier. He cites numerous past examples of this to substantiate his assertions. He predicts that such paradigm shifts have and will continue to become increasingly common, leading to "technological change so rapid and profound it represents a rupture in the fabric of human history". He believes The Law of Accelerating Returns implies that a technological singularity will occur before the end of the 21st century, around 2045. The essay begins:

An analysis of the history of technology shows that technological change is exponential, contrary to the common-sense 'intuitive linear' view. So we won't experience 100 years of progress in the 21st century—it will be more like 20,000 years of progress (at today's rate). The 'returns,' such as chip speed and cost-effectiveness, also increase exponentially. There's even exponential growth in the rate of exponential growth. Within a few decades, machine intelligence will surpass human intelligence, leading to the Singularity—technological change so rapid and profound it represents a rupture in the fabric of human history. The implications include the merger of biological and nonbiological intelligence, immortal software-based humans, and ultra-high levels of intelligence that expand outward in the universe at the speed of light.

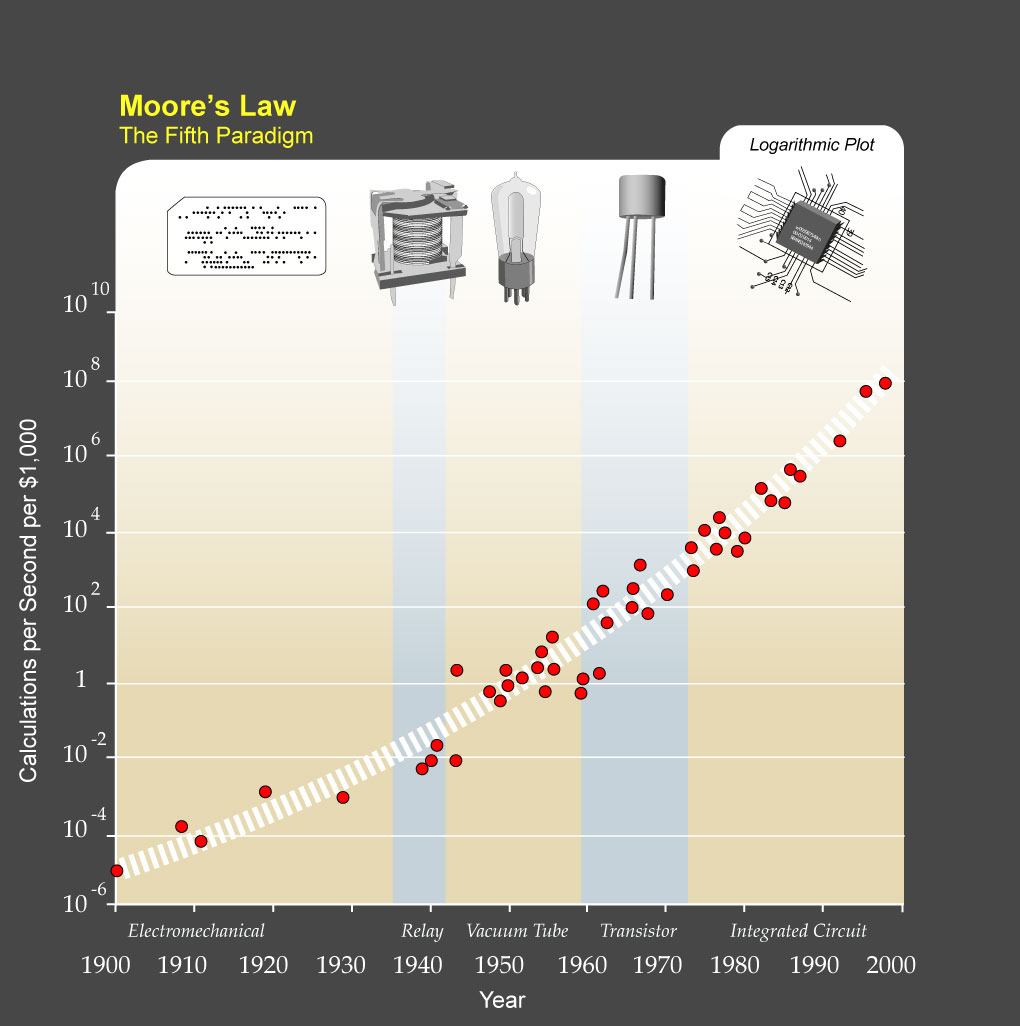
Moore's Law expanded to other technologies

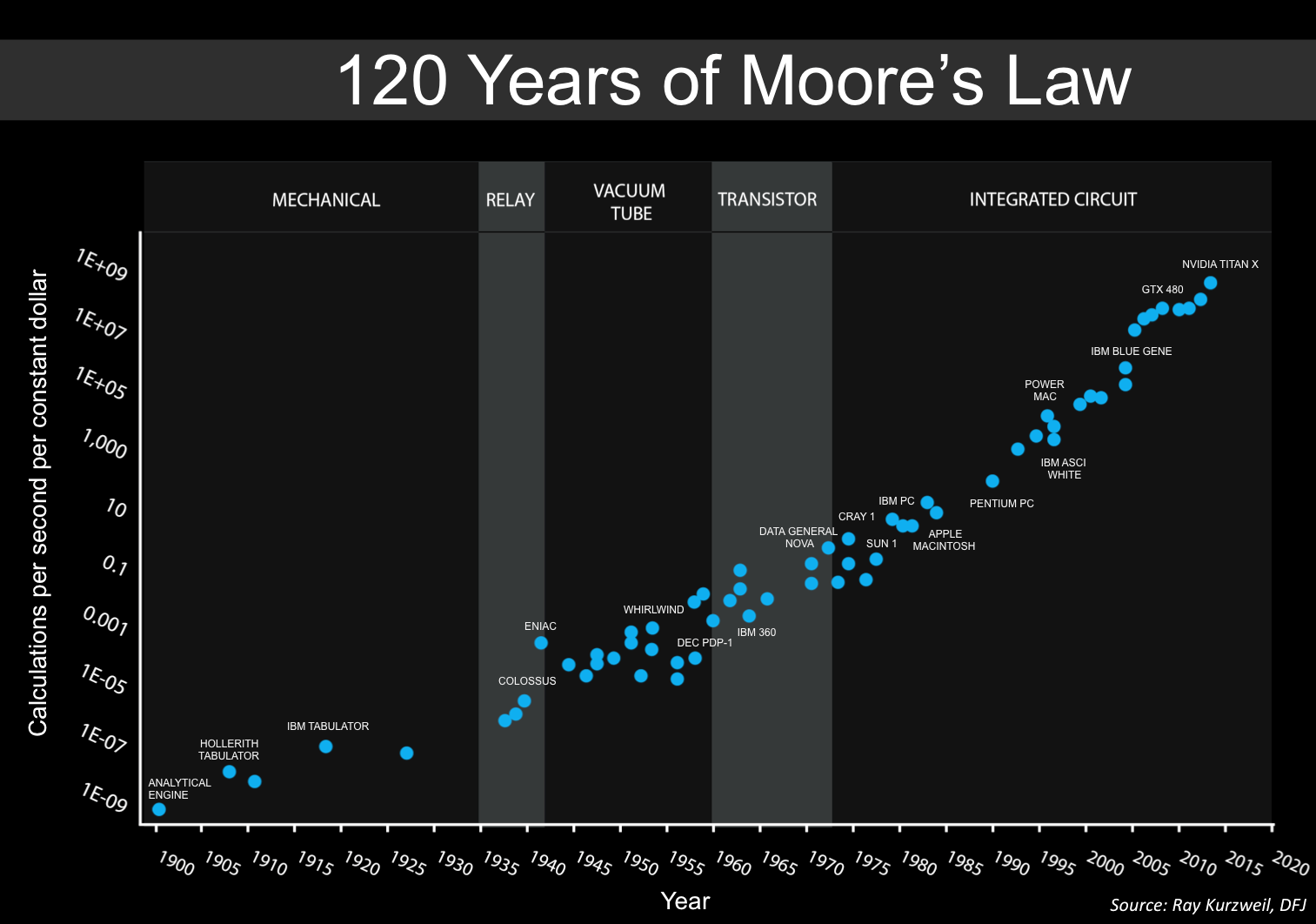
An updated version of Moore's Law over 120 years (based on Kurzweil's graph). The seven most recent data points are all Nvidia GPUs.

The Law of Accelerating Returns has in many ways altered public perception of Moore's law. It is a common (but mistaken) belief that Moore's law makes predictions regarding all forms of technology, when really it only concerns semiconductor circuits. Many futurists still use the term "Moore's law" to describe ideas like those put forth by Moravec, Kurzweil and others.

According to Kurzweil, since the beginning of evolution, more complex life forms have been evolving exponentially faster, with shorter and shorter intervals between the emergence of radically new life forms, such as human beings, who have the capacity to engineer (i.e. intentionally design with efficiency) a new trait which replaces relatively blind evolutionary mechanisms of selection for efficiency. By extension, the rate of technical progress amongst humans has also been exponentially increasing, as we discover more effective ways to do things, we also discover more effective ways to learn, i.e. language, numbers, written language, philosophy, scientific method, instruments of observation, tallying devices, mechanical calculators, computers, each of these major advances in our ability to account for information occur increasingly close together. Already within the past sixty years, life in the industrialized world has changed almost beyond recognition except for living memories from the first half of the 20th century. This pattern will culminate in unimaginable technological progress in the 21st century, leading to a singularity. Kurzweil elaborates on his views in his books The Age of Spiritual Machines and The Singularity Is Near.

== Limits of accelerating change ==
In the natural sciences, it is typical that processes characterized by exponential acceleration in their initial stages go into the saturation phase. This clearly makes it possible to realize that if an increase with acceleration is observed over a certain period of time, this does not mean an endless continuation of this process. On the contrary, in many cases this means an early exit to the plateau of speed. The processes occurring in natural science allow us to suggest that the observed picture of accelerating scientific and technological progress, after some time (in physical processes, as a rule, is short) will be replaced by a slowdown and a complete stop. Despite the possible termination / attenuation of the acceleration of the progress of science and technology in the foreseeable future, progress itself, and as a result, social transformations, will not stop or even slow down - it will continue with the achieved (possibly huge) speed, which has become constant.

Accelerating change may not be restricted to the Anthropocene Epoch, but a general and predictable developmental feature of the universe. The physical processes that generate an acceleration such as Moore's law are positive feedback loops giving rise to exponential or superexponential technological change. These dynamics lead to increasingly efficient and dense configurations of Space, Time, Energy, and Matter (STEM efficiency and density, or STEM "compression"). At the physical limit, this developmental process of accelerating change leads to black hole density organizations, a conclusion also reached by studies of the ultimate physical limits of computation in the universe.

Applying this vision to the search for extraterrestrial intelligence leads to the idea that advanced intelligent life reconfigures itself into a black hole. Such advanced life forms would be interested in inner space, rather than outer space and interstellar expansion. They would thus in some way transcend reality, not be observable and it would be a solution to Fermi's paradox called the "transcension hypothesis". Another solution is that the black holes we observe could actually be interpreted as intelligent super-civilizations feeding on stars, or "stellivores". This dynamics of evolution and development is an invitation to study the universe itself as evolving, developing. If the universe is a kind of superorganism, it may possibly tend to reproduce, naturally or artificially, with intelligent life playing a role.

== Other estimates ==
Dramatic changes in the rate of economic growth have occurred in the past because of some technological advancement. Based on population growth, the economy doubled every 250,000 years from the Paleolithic era until the Neolithic Revolution. The new agricultural economy doubled every 900 years, a remarkable increase. In the current era, beginning with the Industrial Revolution, the world's economic output doubles every fifteen years, sixty times faster than during the agricultural era. If the rise of superhuman intelligence causes a similar revolution, argues Robin Hanson, then one would expect the economy to double at least quarterly and possibly on a weekly basis.

In his 1981 book Critical Path, futurist and inventor R. Buckminster Fuller estimated that if we took all the knowledge that mankind had accumulated and transmitted by the year One CE as equal to one unit of information, it probably took about 1500 years (or until the sixteenth century) for that amount of knowledge to double. The next doubling of knowledge from two to four "knowledge units" took only 250 years, until about 1750 CE. By 1900, one hundred and fifty years later, knowledge had doubled again to 8 units. The observed speed at which information doubled was getting faster and faster.

== Alternative perspectives ==
Both Theodore Modis and Jonathan Huebner have argued—each from different perspectives—that by the late-2010s, the rate of technological innovation had not only ceased to rise, but was actually then declining.

== See also ==
- Accelerando – 2005 science fiction novel by Charles Stross
- Accelerationism – Ideologies of change via capitalism and technology
- Diminishing returns – Economic theory
- Future Shock – 1970 book by Alvin Toffler
- Logarithmic timeline
- Novelty theory – Pseudoscientific idea by Terence McKenna
- Simulated reality – Concept of a false version of reality
- Zimmerman's law – American cryptographer, creator of PGP (born 1954)
- Effective accelerationism – Philosophical and social movement
