= Amy Kurzweil =

American cartoonist (born 1986)

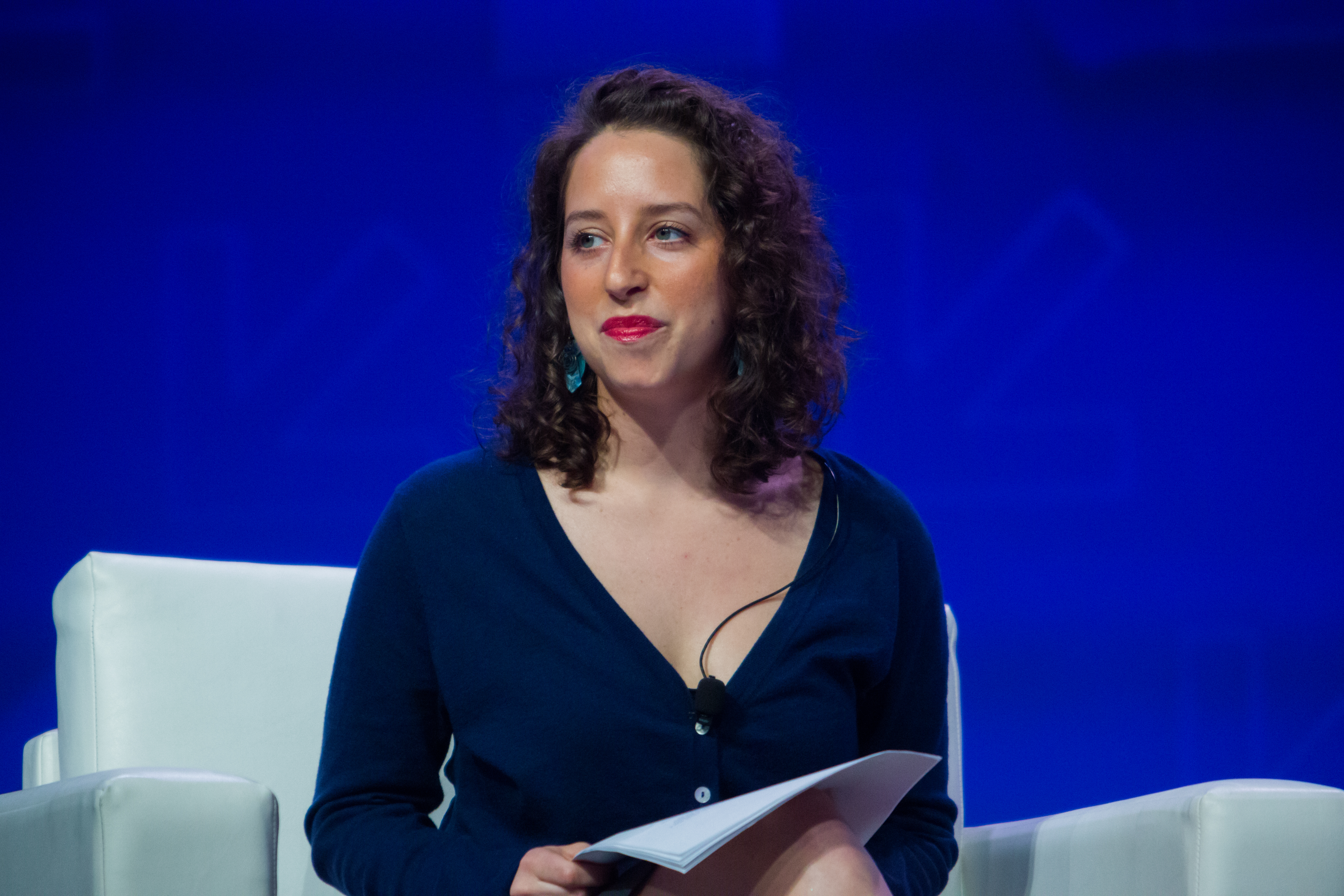
- Kurzweil in 2017
- Born: October 23, 1986 (age 39); Boston, Massachusetts, U.S.
- Education: Stanford University (BA); The New School (MFA)
- Occupations: Cartoonist; teacher; writer
- Relatives: Ray Kurzweil (father)
- Website: Official website

Amy Kurzweil (born October 23, 1986) is an American cartoonist and writer. In 2016, she published the graphic memoir Flying Couch. Her second graphic novel, Artificial: A Love Story was released in 2023. She draws cartoons for The New Yorker.

== Life and career ==
Kurzweil was born in Boston in 1986. Her mother, Sonya, is a psychotherapist, and her father is the futurist and inventor Ray Kurzweil. She graduated from Stanford University in 2009 and earned a master's degree in creative writing from the New School in New York City in 2013. She had multiple teaching jobs in the city, including dance at public schools and English at the Fashion Institute of Technology. She aspired to a career in fiction writing, but in her twenties found "how much I loved to draw". An early cartooning influence was the work of Alison Bechdel.

A graphic novel-cum-memoir by Kurzweil, Flying Couch, was published in 2016. Inspired by graphic novels such as Bechdel's Fun Home, Art Spiegelman's Maus, and Marjane Satrapi's Persepolis, it tells the family history of her bubbe (grandmother) as a Holocaust survivor, her mother as a psychologist, and herself as a young woman. The project began as Kurzweil's (non-cartoon) senior thesis at Stanford, and she continued to research, write, and eventually illustrate it over eight years. Kurzweil drew significantly from an archive at the University of Michigan–Dearborn of oral histories of Holocaust survivors, including an interview with her grandmother. Reviews of the book were largely positive.

Kurzweil's cartoons regularly appear in The New Yorker and other outlets. Her second book, Artificial: A Love Story, follows the life of her father and her grandfather, another survivor of the Holocaust.

== Bibliography ==
- Kurzweil, Amy (October 11, 2016). Flying Couch: A Graphic Memoir. Catapult. ISBN 978-1936787333.
- Kurzweil, Amy (October 17, 2023). Artificial: A Love Story. Catapult. ISBN 978-1948226394.
