= The Age of Intelligent Machines =

1990 non-fiction book by Ray Kurzweil

- Author: Ray Kurzweil
- Language: English
- Publisher: MIT Press
- Publication date: 1990
- Publication place: United States
- Pages: 580
- ISBN: 0-262-11121-7 / ISBN 0-262-61079-5
- Dewey Decimal: 006.3-dc20
- LC Class: Q335.K87 1990
- Followed by: The Age of Spiritual Machines

The Age of Intelligent Machines is a non-fiction book about artificial intelligence by inventor and futurist Ray Kurzweil. This was his first book and the Association of American Publishers named it the Most Outstanding Computer Science Book of 1990. It was reviewed in The New York Times and The Christian Science Monitor. The format is a combination of monograph and anthology with contributed essays by artificial intelligence experts such as Daniel Dennett, Douglas Hofstadter, and Marvin Minsky.

Kurzweil surveys the philosophical, mathematical and technological roots of artificial intelligence, starting with the assumption that a sufficiently advanced computer program could exhibit human-level intelligence. Kurzweil argues the creation of humans through evolution suggests that humans should be able to build something more intelligent than themselves. He believes pattern recognition, as demonstrated by vision, and knowledge representation, as seen in language, are two key components of intelligence. Kurzweil details how quickly computers are advancing in each domain.

Driven by the exponential improvements in computer power, Kurzweil believes artificial intelligence will be possible and then commonplace. He explains how it will impact all areas of people's lives, including work, education, medicine, and warfare. As computers acquire human level faculties Kurzweil says people will be challenged to figure out what it really means to be human.

== Background ==
Ray Kurzweil is an inventor and serial entrepreneur. In 1990 when this book was published he had already started three companies: Kurzweil Computer Products, Kurzweil Music Systems, and Kurzweil Applied Intelligence. The companies developed and sold reading machines for the blind, music synthesizers, and speech recognition software respectively. Optical character recognition, which he used in the reading machine, and speech recognition are both featured centrally in the book as examples of pattern recognition problems. After the publication of The Age of Intelligent Machines he expanded on its ideas with two follow-on books: The Age of Spiritual Machines and the best selling The Singularity is Near.

== Content ==
=== Definition and history ===
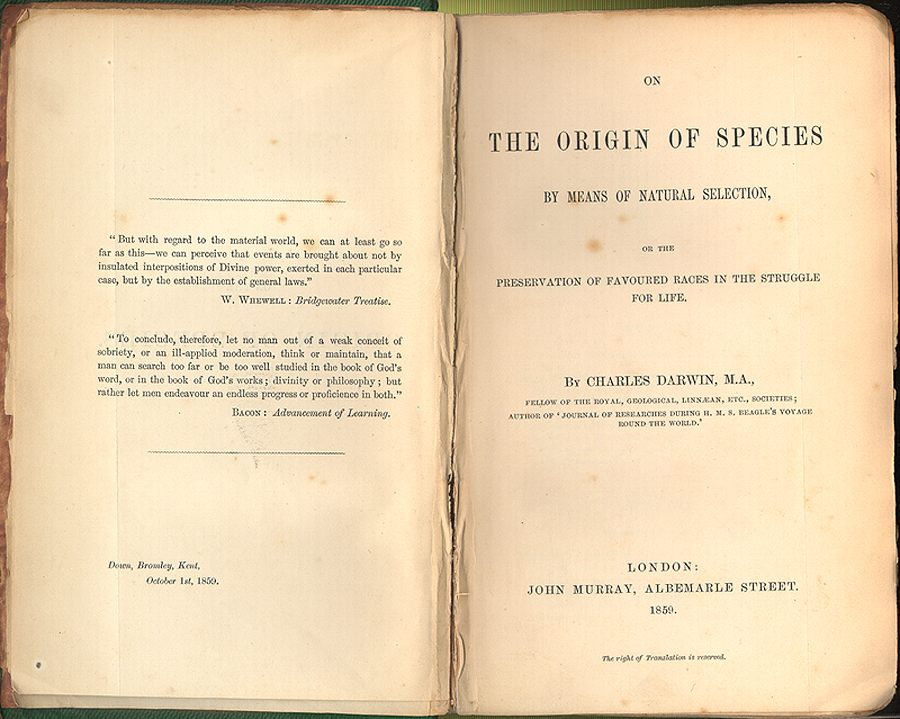
Kurzweil believes evolution proves humans can create a technology more intelligent than themselves.

Kurzweil starts by trying to define artificial intelligence. He leans towards Marvin Minsky's "moving frontier" formulation: "the study of computer problems which have not yet been solved". Then he struggles with defining intelligence itself and concludes "there appears to be no simple definition of intelligence that is satisfactory to most observers". That leads to a discussion about whether evolution, the process, could be considered intelligent.

Kurzweil concludes that evolution is intelligent, but with an IQ only "infinitesimally greater than zero". He penalizes evolution for the extremely long time it takes to create its designs. The human brain operates much more quickly, evidenced by the rate of progress in the last few thousand years, so the brain is more intelligent than its creator. Kurzweil concludes from this that there is no theoretical reason why the human brain cannot create something more intelligent than itself, and suggests "a sufficient number of decades or centuries into the future" humans will in fact be surpassed by their creations.

The field of artificial intelligence presupposes that the human brain is a machine, and that an alternative implementation could be built, as a computer program, which would have the same faculties as the real thing. Kurzweil traces the philosophical underpinnings of this tenet, as well as the opposing view that properties such as consciousness and free will are unique to the human mind. Kurzweil starts with Plato and touches quickly on Descartes, Newton, Kant, Wittgenstein and ends with Hubert Dreyfus. Kurzweil also presents the mathematical roots of artificial intelligence including contributions by Bertrand Russell, Alan Turing, Alonzo Church, and Kurt Gödel. The Turing test is introduced as a way to gauge whether the field of artificial intelligence has succeeded or not.

=== Chess and pattern recognition ===
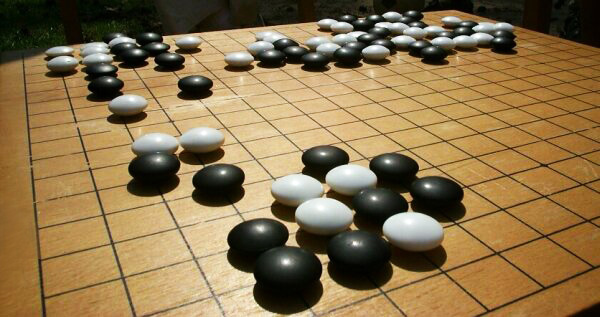
It is much harder to program computers to play the Chinese game of go than it is chess.

Kurzweil discusses how computers play chess in detail, building to his prediction that "we will see a [computer] world champion by the year 2000". The Chinese strategy game of go, however, has proven much more difficult for computers to play well. He considers go to be a "level 3" problem, the type of problem where there is no single unifying formula which solves it. Then Kurzweil reveals that pattern recognition, which is crucial to artificial intelligence, is also a level 3 problem.

Kurzweil traces various ways of doing pattern recognition, from the rise and fall of perceptrons to random neural nets and decision trees, finally explaining that intelligence is a hierarchy of heterogeneous processes "communicating and influencing each other". He believes Marvin Minsky's Society of Mind and Jerome Lettvin's society of neurons are useful models. Kurzweil differentiates logical thinking from pattern recognition, and explains that AI has had much more trouble with pattern recognition, exemplified by efforts to create artificial vision.

Kurzweil estimates that the human vision system does the equivalent of 100 trillion multiplications per second where "a typical personal computer" of the day could only do 100,000 multiplications per second. The way out of this dilemma is parallel processing, having millions or billions of simultaneous processes all computing at the same time, something Kurzweil felt would happen in the future. Kurzweil also discusses speech recognition, which like vision requires complex pattern recognition.

=== Knowledge and art ===
Facts alone do not constitute knowledge. For information to become knowledge, it must incorporate the relationships between ideas. And for the knowledge to be useful, the links describing how concepts interact must be easily accessed, updated, and manipulated.

— Ray Kurzweil, The Age of Intelligent Machines p. 284

In addition to pattern recognition, representative knowledge is also an important aspect of intelligence. Kurzweil details several types of expert systems in medicine, insurance and one for garage mechanics. Knowledge is expressed by language and Kurzweil discusses the state of language understanding including projects such as Terry Winograd's SHRDLU. Kurzweil says robotics is where all AI technologies are used: "vision, pattern recognition, knowledge engineering, decision-making, natural-language understanding and others". He explains how robots are increasingly successful in structured environments like factories, and predicts that "effective robotic servants in the home will probably not appear until early next century".

As a high school student Kurzweil built a computer which could compose music and demonstrated it on the national TV show I've Got a Secret. In The Age of Intelligent Machines he discusses the relationship between artificial intelligence and the production of music and visual art by computers. He includes the freehand drawings of AARON as well as plotter art by Colette Bangert and Charles Bangert. He briefly mentions artificial life, shows a number of computer generated fractals, and writes that "the role of the computer is not to displace human creativity but rather to amplify it."

=== Impact ===
Kurzweil explains that the "functionality per unit cost" in the computer industry has been increasing exponentially for decades. He says computer memory costs one one-hundred millionth of what it did in 1950, for example. Kurzweil admits exponential trends do not last forever, but is convinced computer power could increase by millions of times beyond the 1990 level. If these trends continue, Kurzweil argues, we will see a "translating telephone" by 2010, intelligent assistants by the mid-1990s, and a "completely driverless car" by "well into the first half" of the 21st century. He anticipates we will prove our identity by finger and voice prints and that artificial people will be present as holograms or robots.

Kurzweil believes computers will pass the Turing test this century.

Kurzweil goes into detail about the Turing test and explains that "sometime between 2020 and 2070" the test will be passed to such a degree that "no reasonable person familiar with the field" will question the result. Even as artificial intelligence replaces whole industries, Kurzweil insists there will still be a net gain of jobs. He says fields like "communication, teaching, learning, selling, strategic-decision making and innovation" will continue to be staffed by humans. At work he predicts people will use electronic documents that will be a "web of relationships" like Ted Nelson's hypertext instead of linear like a book.

As far as education Kurzweil feels children will have portable computers on which to run "intelligent and entertaining courseware". Papers, exams, electronic mail and even "love notes" will be sent over wireless networks. All the advanced capability will alter the domain of warfare as well, leading to laser and particle beam weapons, and planes without human pilots. Medicine will entail computer diagnosticians, coordinated data banks of patient histories, realistic simulations for drug designers, and robotically assisted surgery. This leaves humans open to do research, organize knowledge and administer "comfort and caring".

Handicapped individuals will be greatly assisted by the advancing technology with reading machines, hearing machines, and robotic exoskeletons. Kurzweil believes the prejudice the handicapped now suffer will abate with their new abilities. Kurzweil concludes the book by explaining that all of these advances will challenge us; as computers do ever more tasks that used to be our sole domain, as our intelligence is rivaled and then eclipsed by machines, he feels we will need to figure out what makes us human.

== Style ==
Sprinkled throughout the book are 23 essays, 4 of them by Kurzweil himself and 19 others by invited authors: Margaret Litvin, Daniel Dennett, Mitchell Waldrop, Sherry Turkle, Blaine Mathieu, Seymour Papert, Douglas Hofstadter, Marvin Minsky, Edward Feigenbaum, Jeff Pepper, K. Fuchi, Brian Oakley, Harold Cohen, Charles Ames, Michael Lebowitz, Roger Schank and Christopher Owens, Allen Newell, Margaret Boden, and George Gilder. The book closes with a "chronology" listing events from the age of the dinosaurs to the year 2070, fifty pages of end notes and suggested readings, a glossary and an index.

== Reception ==
Jay Garfield in the New York Times wrote that Kurzweil is "clear, current and informative" when writing about areas he has worked directly in, but "sloppy and vague" when talking about philosophy, logic and psychology. Of the prediction for a "translating telephone" by the first decade of the 21st century, Garfield says Kurzweil overlooks "the mammoth difficulties that confront anyone who tries to accomplish such a task".

The Futurist calls it an "impressive volume" which is "handsomely illustrated" and "a feast for the mind and eye"., while Simson Garfinkel in The Christian Science Monitor says The Age of Intelligent Machines is "a tour de force history of artificial intelligence" yet laments that "although the book is orderly, it is not organized" and complains that "details are missing throughout".

Linda Strauss, writing for Science, Technology, & Human Values, calls the book "a rich assemblage of glittering parts, rather awkwardly joined". She points out that Kurzweil really cannot define artificial intelligence, the subject of the book, because he cannot define intelligence. Instead he relies on the Turing test and on Marvin Minsky's notion of intelligence as a moving horizon of unsolved problems. Strauss feels Kurzweil does not consider the cultural and societal implications of his futuristic visions.
