= The Age of Spiritual Machines =

1999 non-fiction book by Ray Kurzweil

The Age of Spiritual Machines: When Computers Exceed Human Intelligence
- Author: Ray Kurzweil
- Publisher: Viking Press
- Publication date: January 1, 1999
- Pages: 400
- ISBN: 0-670-88217-8
- OCLC: 39700377
- Dewey Decimal: 006.3 21
- LC Class: Q335 .K88 1999
- Preceded by: The Age of Intelligent Machines
- Followed by: The Singularity Is Near

The Age of Spiritual Machines: When Computers Exceed Human Intelligence is a non-fiction book by inventor and futurist Ray Kurzweil about artificial intelligence and the future course of humanity. First published in hardcover on January 1, 1999, by Viking, it has received attention from The New York Times, The New York Review of Books and The Atlantic. In the book Kurzweil outlines his vision for how technology will progress during the 21st century.

Kurzweil believes evolution provides evidence that humans will one day create machines more intelligent than they are. He presents his law of accelerating returns to explain why "key events" happen more frequently as time marches on. It also explains why the computational capacity of computers is increasing exponentially. Kurzweil writes that this increase is one ingredient in the creation of artificial intelligence; the others are automatic knowledge acquisition and algorithms like recursion, neural networks, and genetic algorithms.

Kurzweil predicts machines with human-level intelligence will be available from affordable computing devices within a couple of decades, revolutionizing most aspects of life. He says nanotechnology will augment our bodies and cure cancer even as humans connect to computers via direct neural interfaces or live full-time in virtual reality. Kurzweil predicts the machines "will appear to have their own free will" and even "spiritual experiences". He says humans will essentially live forever as humanity and its machinery become one and the same. He predicts that intelligence will expand outward from Earth until it grows powerful enough to influence the fate of the universe.

Reviewers appreciated Kurzweil's track record with predictions, his ability to extrapolate technology trends, and his clear explanations. However, there was disagreement on whether computers will one day be conscious. Philosophers John Searle and Colin McGinn insist that computation alone cannot possibly create a conscious machine. Searle deploys a variant of his well-known Chinese room argument, this time tailored to computers playing chess, a topic Kurzweil covers. Searle writes that computers can only manipulate symbols which are meaningless to them, an assertion which if true subverts much of the vision of the book.

== Background ==
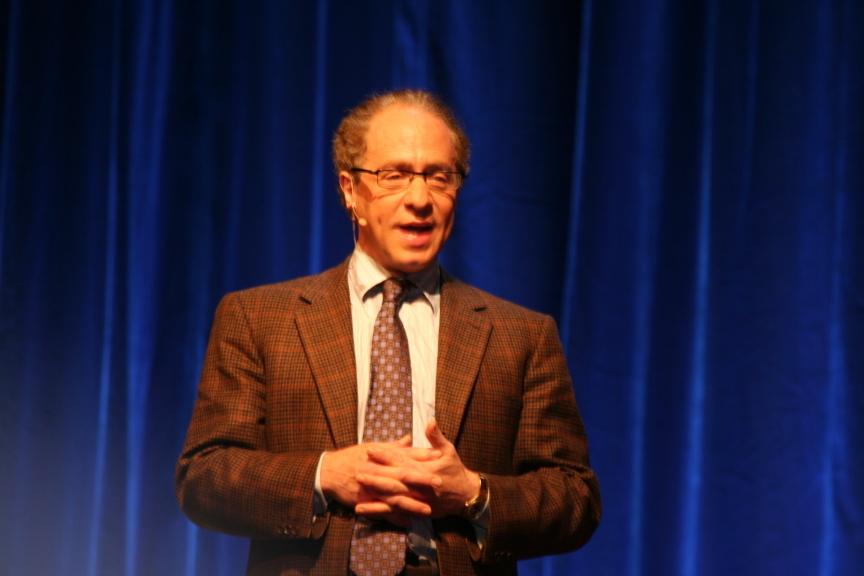
Ray Kurzweil in 2006

Ray Kurzweil is an inventor and serial entrepreneur. When The Age of Spiritual Machines was published he had already started four companies: Kurzweil Computer Products, Inc. which created optical character recognition and image scanning technology to assist the blind, Kurzweil Music Systems, which developed music synthesizers with high quality emulation of real instruments, Kurzweil Applied Intelligence, which created speech recognition technology, and Kurzweil Educational Systems, which made print-to-speech reading technology. Critics say predictions from his previous book The Age of Intelligent Machines "have largely come true" and "anticipated with uncanny accuracy most of the key computer developments" of the 1990s. After this book was published he went on to expand upon its ideas in a follow-on book The Singularity is Near. Today Ray Kurzweil works at Google where he is attempting to "create a truly useful AI [artificial intelligence] that will make all of us smarter".

== Content ==
=== Law of accelerating returns ===
Kurzweil opens by explaining that the frequency of universe-wide events has been slowing down since the Big Bang while evolution has been reaching important milestones at an ever-increasing pace. This is not a paradox, he writes, entropy (disorder) is increasing overall, but local pockets of increasing order are flourishing. Kurzweil explains how biological evolution leads to technology which leads to computation which leads to Moore's law.

Kurzweil unveils several laws of his own related to this progression, leading up to his law of accelerating returns which says time speeds up as order increases. He believes Moore's law will end "by the year 2020" but that the law of accelerating returns mandates progress will continue to accelerate, therefore some replacement technology will be discovered or perfected to carry on the exponential growth.

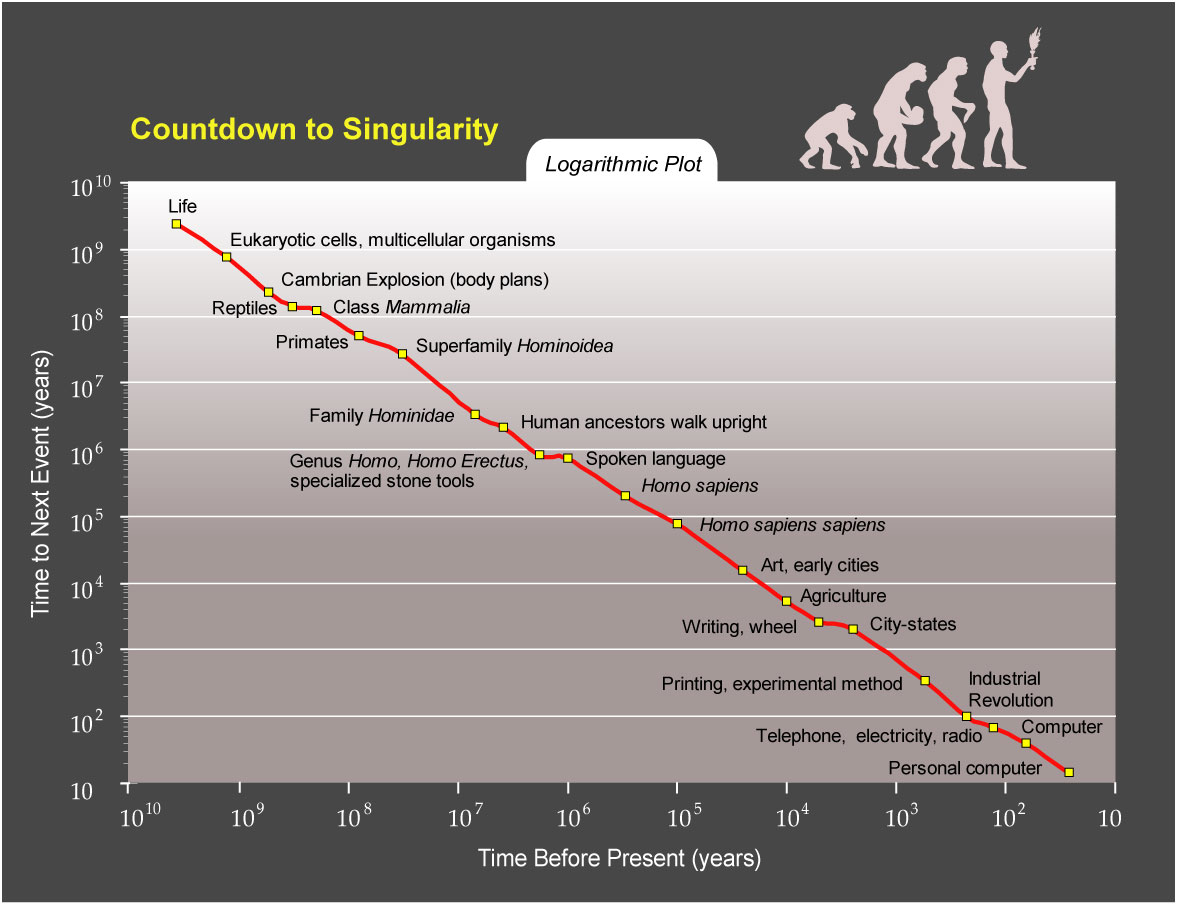
Time periods between key events in human history shrink exponentially in a chart by Kurzweil depicting his law of accelerating returns.

As in The Age of Intelligent Machines Kurzweil argues here that evolution has an intelligence quotient just slightly greater than zero. He says it is not higher than that because evolution operates so slowly, and intelligence is a function of time. Kurzweil explains that humans are far more intelligent than evolution, based on what we have created in the last few thousand years, and that in turn our creations will soon be more intelligent than us. The law of accelerating returns predicts this will happen within decades, Kurzweil reveals.

=== Philosophy of mind ===
Kurzweil introduces several thought experiments related to brain implants and brain scanning; he concludes we are not a collection of atoms, instead we are a pattern which can manifest itself in different mediums at different times. He tackles the mystery of how self-awareness and consciousness can arise from mere matter, but without resolution. Based partly on his Unitarian religious education Kurzweil feels "all of these views are correct when viewed together, but insufficient when viewed one at a time" while at the same time admitting this is "contradictory and makes little sense".

Kurzweil defines the spiritual experience as "a feeling of transcending one's everyday physical and mortal bounds to sense a deeper reality". He elaborates that "just being—experiencing, being conscious—is spiritual, and reflects the essence of spirituality". In the future, Kurzweil believes, computers will "claim to be conscious, and thus to be spiritual" and concludes "twenty-first-century machines" will go to church, meditate, and pray to connect with this spirituality.

=== Artificial intelligence ===
A simple artificial neural network

Kurzweil says Alan Turing's 1950 paper Computing Machinery and Intelligence launched the field of artificial intelligence. He admits that early progress in the field led to wild predictions of future successes which did not materialize. Kurzweil feels intelligence is the "ability to use optimally limited resources" to achieve goals. He contrasts recursive solutions with neural nets, he likes both but specifically mentions how valuable neural nets are since they destroy information during processing, which if done selectively is essential to making sense of real-world data. A neuron either fires or not "reducing the babble of its inputs to a single bit". He also greatly admires genetic algorithms which mimic biological evolution to great effect.

Recursion, neural nets and genetic algorithms are all components of intelligent machines, Kurzweil explains. Beyond algorithms Kurzweil says the machines will also need knowledge. The emergent techniques, neural nets and genetic algorithms, require significant training effort above and beyond creating the initial machinery. While hand-coded knowledge is tedious and brittle acquiring knowledge through language is extremely complex.

=== Building new brains ===
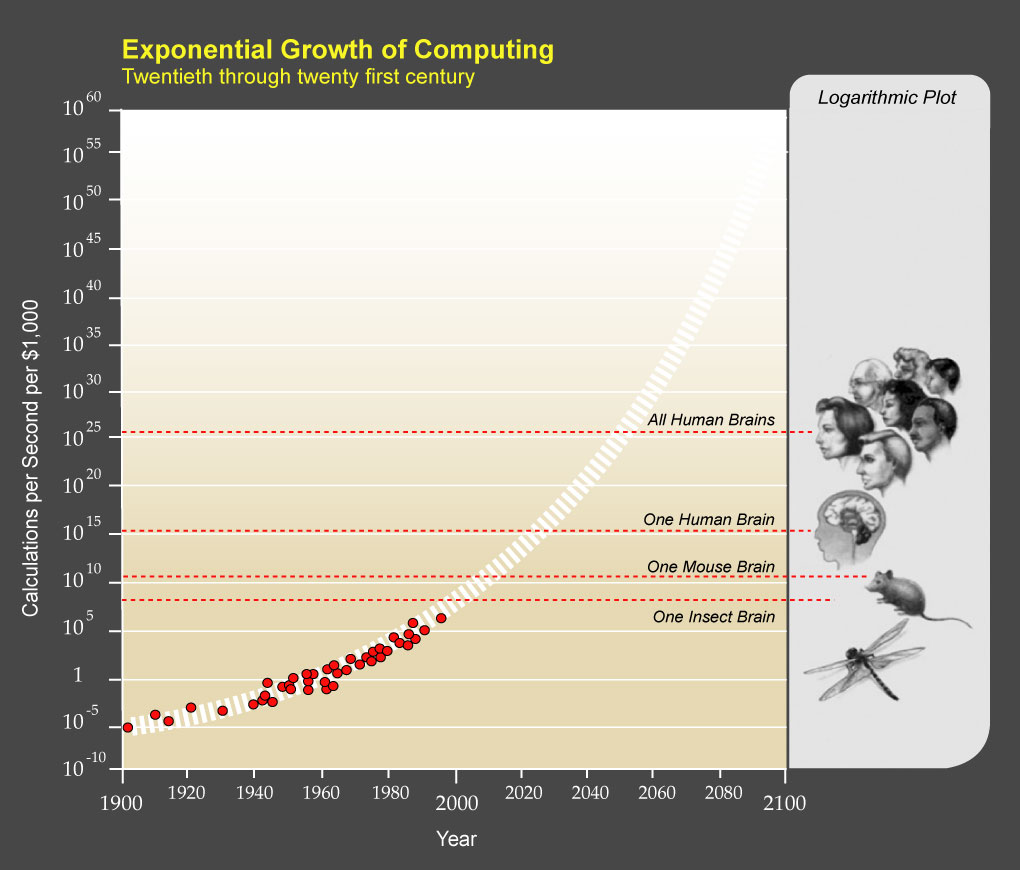
Kurzweil shows that computer power is growing exponentially.

To build an artificial brain requires formulas, knowledge and sufficient computational power, explains Kurzweil. He says "by around the year 2020" a $1,000 personal computer will have enough speed and memory to match the human brain, based on the law of accelerating returns and his own estimates of the computational speed and memory capacity of the brain. Kurzweil predicts Moore's law will last until 2020 so current integrated circuits should come close to human brain levels of computation, but he says three dimensional chips will be the next big technology, followed potentially by optical computing, DNA computing, nanotubes, or quantum computing.

Kurzweil feels the best model for an artificial brain is a real human brain, and suggests slicing up and digitizing preserved human brains or examining them non-invasively as technology permits. Kurzweil differentiates between scanning the brain to understand it, in a generic fashion, and scanning a particular person's brain in order to preserve it in exact detail, for "uploading" into a computer for example. The latter is much harder to do, he notes, because it requires capturing much more detail, but it will eventually happen as well. When it does "we will be software, not hardware" and our mortality will become a function of our ability to "make frequent backups".

=== Building new bodies ===
Kurzweil notes that many thoughts people have are related to their bodies, and reassures that he does not believe in creating a disembodied brain. He reviews all the various body implants that existed when the book was published, explaining that our bodies are already becoming more synthetic over time. Kurzweil says this trend will continue and that the technology will advance from macroscopic implants, to cellular sized insertions, and finally to nanotechnology.

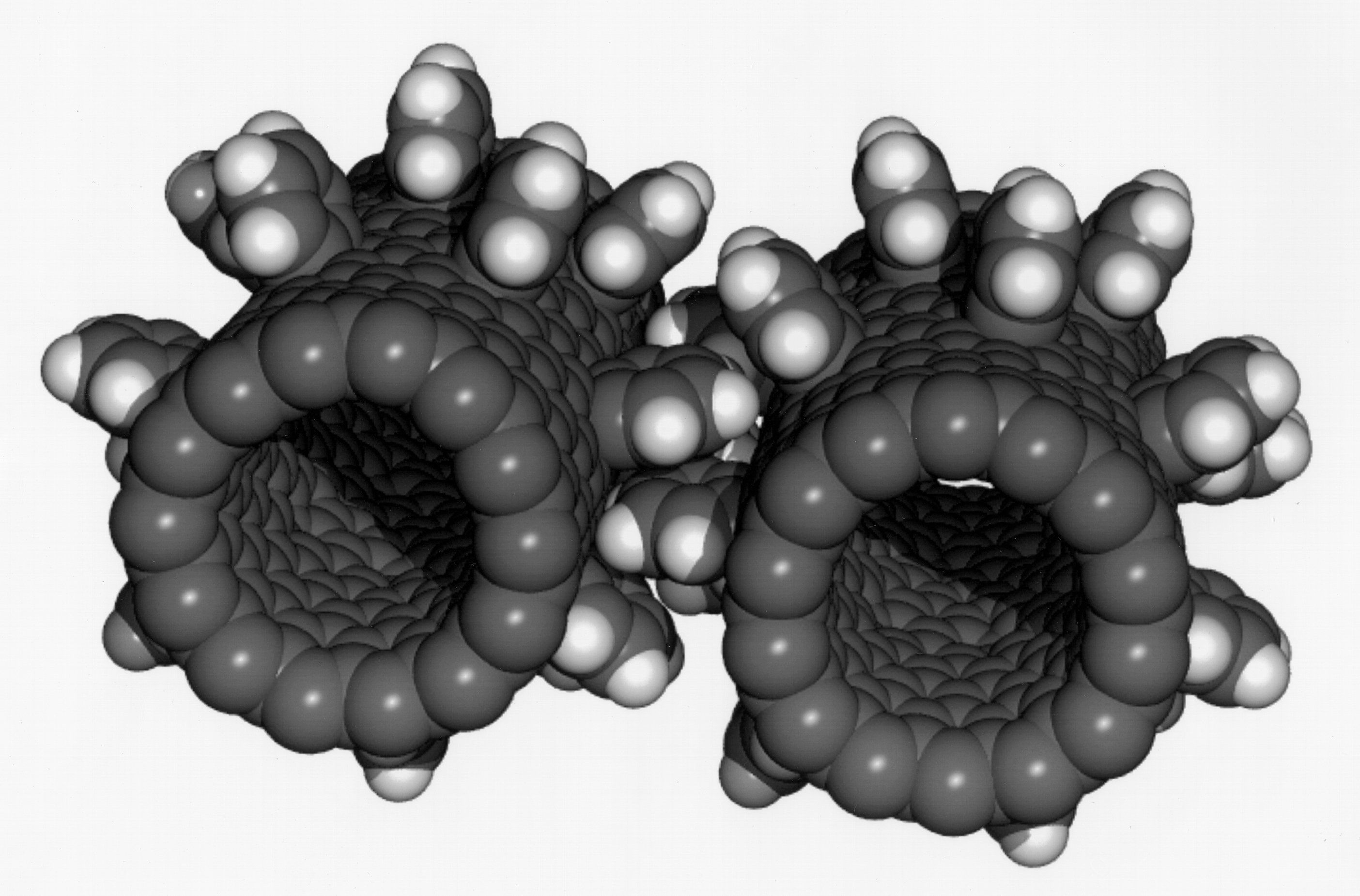
Molecular-sized gears are an example of nanotechnology.

Nanotechnology has the potential to reshape the entire world, Kurzweil exclaims. Assembling materials molecule by molecule could solve energy problems, cure cancer and other diseases, strengthen our bodies, and produce self-assembling food, clothing, and buildings. Kurzweil admits that nanotechnology carries a big risk; a self-replicating substance, without the constraints of a living organism, might grow out of control and consume everything. However he points out that today there are already technologies which pose grave risks, for example nuclear power or weapons, and we have managed to keep them relatively safe, so he feels we can probably do the same with nanotechnology.

Finally Kurzweil says there is the prospect of virtual bodies, where direct neural implants would give us the sensation of having bodies and a way to exert control, without any physical manifestation at all. Although he quickly brings things back to nanotechnology by pointing out that sufficiently advanced nanotechnology will be like having a virtual world, since "utility fog" will appear to be entirely absent and then instantly morph into functional physical shapes. Kurzweil broaches the topic of sex in futuristic times, reminding us that every new technology "adopts sexual themes". Kurzweil envisions virtual sex, sexbots, and as well as more chaste activities like strolling along a "virtual Cancún beach".

=== State of the art ===
Kurzweil explains that in 1999 computers are essential to most facets of life, yet he predicts no major disruption related to the then-pending Y2K problem. He says computers are narrow-minded and brittle so far, but suggests in specific domains they are showing signs of intelligence. As examples Kurzweil cites computer-generated or assisted music, and tools for the automatic or semi-automatic production of literature or poetry. He shows examples of paintings by AARON as programmed by Harold Cohen which can be automatically created. Kurzweil reviews some of his predictions from The Age of Intelligent Machines and various past presentations, and is very pleased with his record. Finally he predicts a new Luddite movement as intelligent machines take away jobs, although he predicts a net gain of new and better jobs.

=== Predictions ===
Kurzweil has a dense chapter of predictions for each of these years: 2009, 2019, 2029, 2099. For example, when discussing the year 2009 he makes many separate predictions related to computer hardware, education, people with disabilities, communication, business and economics, politics and society, the arts, warfare, health and medicine, and philosophy.

As one example he predicts a 2009 computer will be a tablet or smaller sized device with a high quality but somewhat conventional display, while in 2019 computers are "largely invisible" and images are mostly projected directly into the retina, and by 2029 he predicts computers will communicate through direct neural pathways. Similarly in 2009 he says there is interest and speculation about the Turing test, by 2019 there are "prevalent reports" of computers passing the test, but not rigorously, while by 2029 machines "routinely" pass the test, although there is still controversy about how machine and human intelligence compare.

In 2009 he writes it will take a supercomputer to match the power of one human brain, in 2019 $4,000 will accomplish the same thing, while in 2029 $1,000 will buy the equivalent of 1000 humans brains. Dollar figures are in 1999 dollars. Kurzweil predicts life expectancy will rise to "over one hundred" by 2019, to 120 by 2029, and will be indefinitely long by 2099 as humans and computers will have merged.

=== Molly ===
The book features a series of sometimes humorous dialogs between an initially unnamed character, later revealed to be a young woman named Molly, and the author. For most of the book she serves as proxy for the reader, asking the author for clarification, challenging him, or otherwise eliciting additional commentary about the current chapter. For example:

So I'll be able to download memories of experiences I've never had?
Yes, but someone has probably had the experience. So why not have the ability to share it?
I suppose for some experiences, it might be safer to just download the memories.
Less time-consuming also.
Do you really think that scanning a frozen brain is feasible today?
Sure, just stick your head in my freezer here.

Later in the book during the prediction chapters Molly seems to inhabit whatever year the predictions are about, while Kurzweil remains in the present. So Kurzweil starts questioning her about how things are in future, and her lines serve as additional predictions or commentary. For example:

No, I'm talking about real reality now. For example, I can see that Jeremy is two blocks away, headed in this direction.
An embedded chip?
That's a reasonable guess. But it's not a chip exactly. It's one of the first useful nanotechnology applications. You eat this stuff.
Stuff?
Yeah, it's a paste, tastes pretty good, actually. It has millions of little computers — we call them trackers — which work their way into your cells.

=== The rest of the universe ===
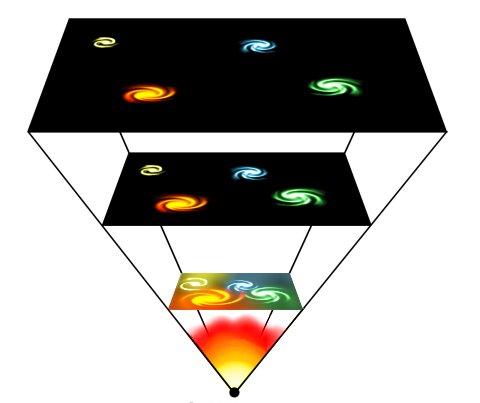
Kurzweil says a universe infused with intelligence may be able to decide its own fate, perhaps avoiding the "big crunch" depicted here.

Kurzweil says life in the universe is "both rare and plentiful" meaning for vast stretches there is nothing then piled into a small space it is everywhere. He suggests any form of life that invents technology will, if it survives, relatively quickly reach the point of merging with that technology, the same thing he predicts will happen to humans. Therefore, Kurzweil explains if we ever met another civilization, we would really be meeting with its technology. The technology would likely be microscopic in size because that is all that would be necessary for exploration. The civilization would not be looking for anything except knowledge, therefore we would likely never notice it.

Kurzweil feels intelligence is the strongest force in the universe, because intelligence can cause sweeping physical changes like defending a planet from an asteroid. Kurzweil predicts that as the "computational density" of the universe increases, intelligence will rival even "big celestial forces". There is disagreement about whether the universe will end in a big crunch or a long slow expansion, Kurzweil says the answer is still up in the air because intelligence will ultimately make the decision.

== Reception ==
=== Analysis ===
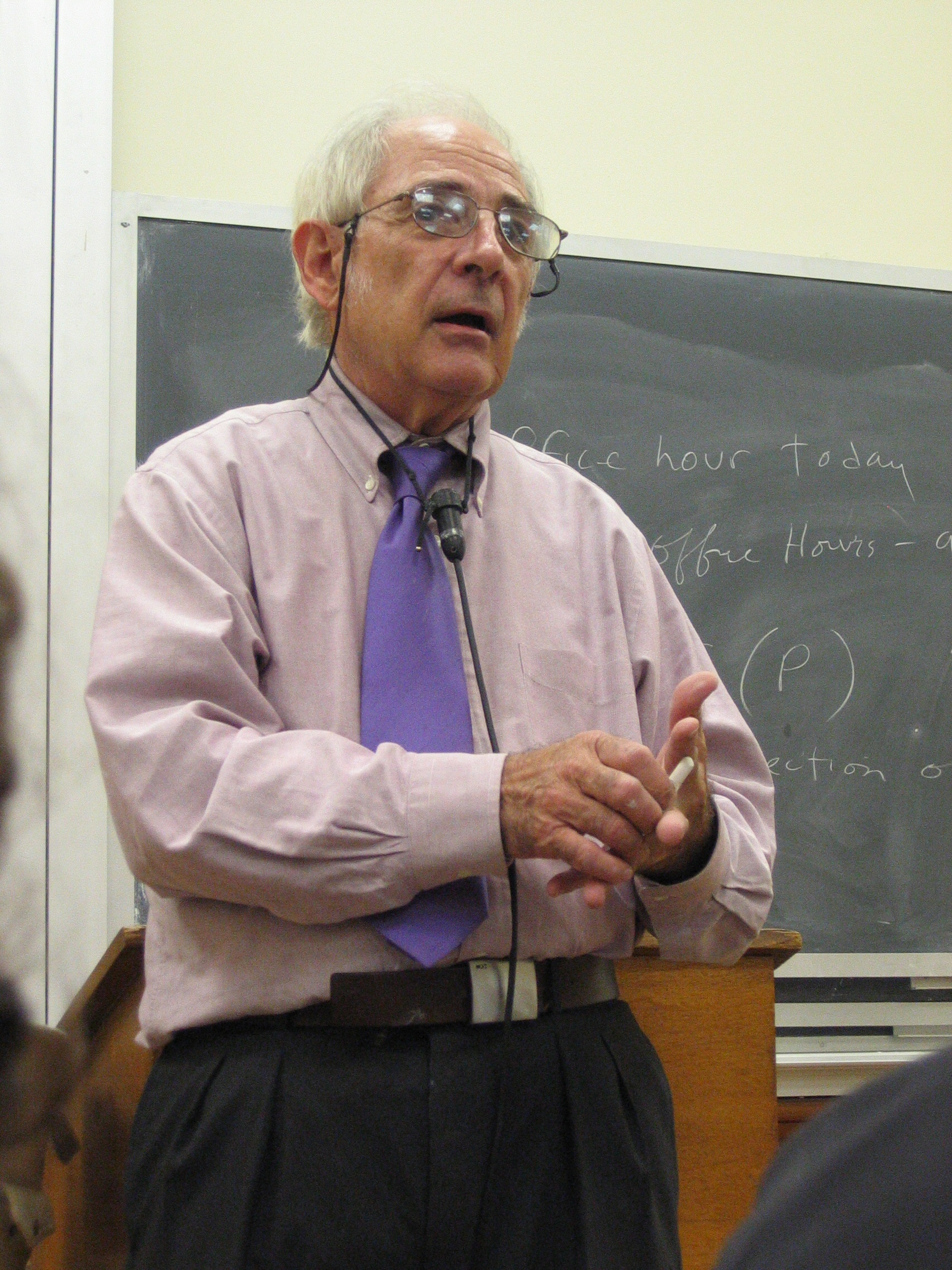
John Searle believes computers cannot be conscious; he says they can only manipulate meaningless symbols.

Kurzweil uses Deep Blue, the IBM computer that beat the world chess champion in 1997, as an example of fledgling machine intelligence. John Searle, author and professor of philosophy at University of California, Berkeley, reviewing The Age of Spiritual Machines in The New York Review of Books, disagrees with Kurzweil's interpretation. Searle argues that while Kasparov was "quite literally, playing chess" the computer in contrast was doing "nothing remotely like it;" instead, it was merely manipulating "a bunch of meaningless symbols".

Searle offers a variant of his Chinese room argument, calling it the Chess Room Argument, where instead of answering questions in Chinese, the man in a room is playing chess. Or rather, as Searle explains, he is inside the room manipulating symbols which are meaningless to him, while his actions result in winning chess games outside the room. Searle concludes that like a computer, the man has no understanding of chess. Searle compares Deep Blue's victory to the manner in which a pocket calculator can beat humans at arithmetic; he adds that it is no more significant than a steel robot which is too tough for human beings to tackle during a game of American football. Kurzweil counters that the very same argument could be made of the human brain, since the individual neurons have no true understanding of the bigger problem the brain is working on but, added together, they produce what is known as consciousness[5].

Searle continues by contrasting simulation of something with "duplication or recreation" of it. Searle points out a computer can simulate digestion, but it will not be able to digest actual pizza. In the same way, he says, computers can simulate the processes of a conscious brain, but that does not mean it is conscious. Searle has no objection to constructing an artificial consciousness producing brain "using some chemistry different from neurons" so long as it duplicates "the actual causal powers of the brain" which he says precludes computation by itself, since that only involves symbol manipulation. Searle concludes by saying the increased computational power that Kurzweil predicts "moves us not one bit closer to creating a conscious machine", instead he says the first step to building conscious machines is to understand how the brain produces consciousness, something we are only in the infancy of doing.

Colin McGinn wrote in The New York Times that machines might eventually exhibit external behavior at a human-level, but it would be impossible to know if they have an "inner subjective experience" as people do. If they do not, then "uploading" someone into a computer is equivalent to letting their mind "evaporate into thin air," he argues. McGinn is skeptical of the Turing test, claiming it smacks of the long-abandoned doctrine of behaviorism, and agreeing with the validity of Searle's "quite devastating" Chinese room argument. He believes minds do compute, but that it does not follow that computation alone can create a mind, instead he says minds have phenomenological properties, perhaps originating from organic tissue. Therefore, he insists that neither silicon chips nor any future technology Kurzweil mentions will ever be conscious.

=== Reviews ===
McGinn says The Age of Spiritual Machines is "detailed, thoughtful, clearly explained and attractively written" as well as having "an engaging discussion of the future of virtual sex" and that the book is for "anyone who wonders where human technology is going next". However, Diane Proudfoot, philosophy professor at the University of Canterbury, wrote in Science that Kurzweil's historical details are inaccurate and his philosophical understanding is flawed and that these transgressions inspired "little confidence in his imaginings about the future".

Chet Raymo, physics professor at Stonehill College writes that "Ray Kurzweil has a better record than most at foreseeing the digital future" and "Kurzweil paints a tantalizing — and sometimes terrifying — portrait of a world where the line between humans and machines has become thoroughly blurred". He says the book is a "welcome challenge to beliefs we hold dear" and feels we can only shape the future if we anticipate it first. Jim Bencivenga, staff writer for The Christian Science Monitor, says Kurzweil "possesses a highly refined and precise ability to think exponentially about technology over time". Bencivenga also says we should take Kurzweil's predictions very seriously because of his "proven track record". Lyle Feisel, former electrical engineering professor, writes the predictions from Kurzweil's The Age of Intelligent Machines "have largely come true" and so "engineers and computer scientists would do well to give [this book] a read".

== In other media ==
The Canadian rock band Our Lady Peace based their 2000 concept album Spiritual Machines on The Age of Spiritual Machines. They recruited Kurzweil to voice several tracks, on which he read select passages from the book. On October 29, 2021, Our Lady Peace released a sequel album, Spiritual Machines 2, as an NFT that was made available on January 28, 2022, in traditional formats.

== See also ==
- Algorithms
- Analytical Engine
- Antimatter
- Artificial life
- Cosmological constant
- Cochlear implant
- Eric Drexler
- Thomas Edison
- Albert Einstein
- The Emperor's New Mind
- Encryption
- Facial recognition system
- Richard Feynman
- Gödel's incompleteness theorems
- Douglas Hofstadter
- Holography
- Human Genome Project
- Image processing
- Integrated circuits
- Ted Kaczynski
- Garry Kasparov
- Lisp (programming language)
- Marvin Minsky
- Gordon Moore
- Hans Moravec
- Parallel processing
- Pattern recognition
- Roger Penrose
- Recursion
- Bertrand Russell
- Thermodynamics
- Tractatus Logico-Philosophicus
- Alan Turing
- Virtual reality
