= Ray Kurzweil =

American computer scientist, author and futurist (born 1948)

- Kurzweil at South by Southwest 2024
- Born: Raymond Kurzweil; February 12, 1948 (age 78); New York City, New York, U.S.
- Education: Massachusetts Institute of Technology (BS)
- Employer: Google
- Known for: Co-founder of Kurzweil Music Systems; The Age of Spiritual Machines (1999); The Singularity Is Near (2005); The Law of Accelerating Returns
- Children: 2, including Amy
- Awards: Grace Murray Hopper Award (1978); National Medal of Technology (1999)
- Website: Official website

Raymond Kurzweil (/ˈkɜːrzwaɪl/ KURZ-wyle; born February 12, 1948) is an American computer scientist, author, entrepreneur, futurist, and inventor. He is involved in fields such as optical character recognition (OCR), text-to-speech synthesis, speech recognition technology and electronic keyboard instruments. He has written books on health technology, artificial intelligence (AI), transhumanism, the technological singularity, and futurism. Kurzweil is a prominent transhumanist who gives lectures about his optimistic outlook on the possibility of life extension via nanotechnology, robotics, and biotechnology.

Kurzweil received the 1999 National Medal of Technology and Innovation, the United States' highest honor in technology, from President Bill Clinton in a White House ceremony. He received the $500,000 Lemelson–MIT Prize in 2001. He was elected a member of the National Academy of Engineering in 2001 for the application of technology to improve human-machine communication. In 2002 he was inducted into the National Inventors Hall of Fame, established by the U.S. Patent Office. He has 21 honorary doctorates and honors from three U.S. presidents. The Public Broadcasting Service (PBS) included Kurzweil as one of 16 "revolutionaries who made America" along with other inventors of the past two centuries. Inc. magazine ranked him No. 8 among the "most fascinating" entrepreneurs in the United States and called him "Edison's rightful heir".

== Life, inventions, and business career ==
=== Early life ===
Kurzweil grew up in Queens, New York City. He attended NYC Public Education Kingsbury Elementary School PS188. He was born to secular Jewish parents who had emigrated from Austria just before the onset of World War II. Through Unitarian Universalism he was exposed to a diversity of religious faiths during his upbringing. His father, Fredric, was a concert pianist, a conductor and a music educator. His mother, Hannah, was a visual artist. He is the elder of two children; his sister Enid, an accountant in Santa Barbara, is six years his junior.

As a boy, Kurzweil had an inventory of parts from various construction toys he had been given and old electronic gadgets he had collected from neighbors. In his youth, he was an avid reader of science fiction. At age eight, nine, and ten, he read the entire Tom Swift Jr. series. At age seven or eight, he built a robotic puppet theater and robotic game. He was involved with computers by age 12 (in 1960), when only a dozen computers existed in New York City, and built computing devices and statistical programs for the predecessor of Head Start. His parents were involved with the arts, and he is quoted in the documentary Transcendent Man as saying that the household always discussed the future and technology.

Kurzweil attended Martin Van Buren High School. His uncle, an engineer at Bell Labs, taught Kurzweil the basics of computer science. In 1963, at 15, he wrote his first computer program.

Kurzweil created pattern-recognition software that analyzed the works of classical composers, then synthesized its own songs in similar styles. In 1965 he was invited to appear on the CBS television program I've Got a Secret, where he performed a piano piece composed by a computer he had built. Later in the year, he won first prize in the International Science Fair for the invention; his submission to Westinghouse Talent Search of his first computer program alongside several other projects resulted in his being one of the contest's national winners, for which President Lyndon B. Johnson personally congratulated him during a White House ceremony. The experiences impressed upon Kurzweil the belief that nearly any problem could be overcome.

=== Midlife ===
While in high school, Kurzweil had corresponded with Marvin Minsky and was invited to visit him at Massachusetts Institute of Technology, which he did. Kurzweil also visited Frank Rosenblatt, a psychologist at Cornell. He attended MIT to study with Minsky, obtaining a B.Sc. degree in computer science and literature in 1970. Kurzweil took all the computer programming courses (eight or nine) MIT offered in his first year and a half.

In 1968, during his second year at MIT, Kurzweil started a company that used a computer program to match high school students with colleges. The program, called the Select College Consulting Program, was designed by him and compared thousands of different criteria about each college with questionnaire answers each student applicant submitted. Around that time he sold the company to Harcourt, Brace & World for $100,000 ($925,837 in 2025) plus royalties. In 1974, he founded Kurzweil Computer Products, Inc., and led development of the first omni-font optical character recognition system, a computer program capable of recognizing text written in any normal font. Before that time, scanners had been able to read text in only a few fonts. He decided that the technology's best application would be to create a reading machine, which would allow blind people to understand text by having a computer read it to them aloud. But the device required the invention of two enabling technologies—the CCD flatbed scanner and the text-to-speech synthesizer. Development of these technologies was completed at other institutions like Bell Labs, and on January 13, 1976, the finished product was unveiled during a news conference headed by Kurzweil and the leaders of the National Federation of the Blind. Called the Kurzweil Reading Machine, the device was large and covered an entire tabletop. Stevie Wonder heard about the demonstration of this new machine on The Today Show, and later became the user of the first production Kurzweil Reading Machine, beginning a long-term association with Kurzweil.

Kurzweil's next major business venture began in 1978, when Kurzweil Computer Products began selling a commercial version of the optical character recognition computer program. LexisNexis was one of the first customers, and bought the program to upload paper legal and news documents to its nascent online databases. He sold Kurzweil Computer Products to Xerox, where it was first known as Xerox Imaging Systems and later as Scansoft; he was a consultant for Xerox until 1995. In 1999, Visioneer, Inc. acquired Scansoft from Xerox to form a new public company with Scansoft as the new company-wide name. Scansoft merged with Nuance Communications in 2005.

Kurzweil's next business venture was in electronic music technology. After a 1982 meeting with Stevie Wonder, in which Wonder lamented the divide in capabilities and qualities between electronic synthesizers and traditional musical instruments, Kurzweil was inspired to create a new generation of synthesizers that could duplicate the sounds of real instruments. Kurzweil Music Systems was founded in the same year, and in 1984, the Kurzweil K250 was unveiled. The machine could imitate a number of instruments, and according to Kurzweil's press packet, musicians could not tell the difference between the Kurzweil K250 on piano mode and a grand piano, though reviewers who actually attempted it questioned that. The machine's recording and mixing abilities coupled with its ability to imitate different instruments made it possible for a single user to compose and play an entire orchestral piece.

South Korean musical instrument manufacturer Young Chang bought Kurzweil Music Systems in 1990. As with Xerox, Kurzweil remained as a consultant for several years. Hyundai acquired Young Chang in 2006, and in 2007 appointed Kurzweil as Chief Strategy Officer of Kurzweil Music Systems. Concurrent with Kurzweil Music Systems, he created the company Kurzweil Applied Intelligence (KAI) to develop computer speech recognition systems for commercial use. The first product, which debuted in 1987, was an early speech recognition program. KAI was sold to Lernout & Hauspie in 1997.

=== Later life ===
Kurzweil started Kurzweil Educational Systems (KESI) in 1996 to develop new pattern-recognition-based computer technologies to help people with disabilities such as blindness, dyslexia, and attention-deficit hyperactivity disorder (ADHD) in school. Products include the Kurzweil 1000 text-to-speech converter software program, which enables a computer to read electronic and scanned text aloud to blind or visually impaired users, and the Kurzweil 3000 program, a multifaceted electronic learning system that helps with reading, writing, and study skills. Kurzweil sold KESI to Lernout & Hauspie. After the legal and bankruptcy problems of the latter, he and other KESI employees bought back the company. KESI was eventually sold to Cambium Learning Group, Inc.

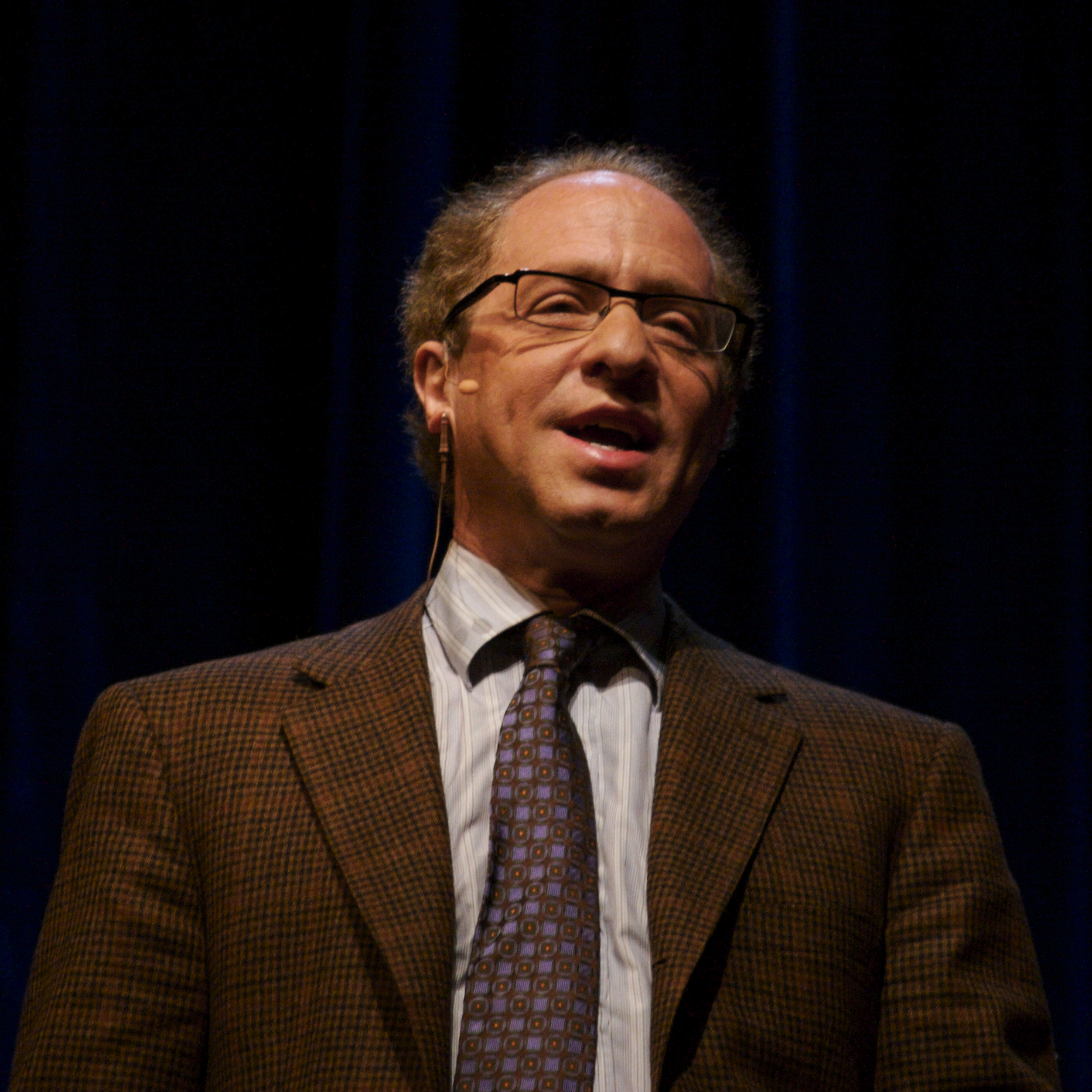
Kurzweil at the Singularity Summit at Stanford University in 2006

During the 1990s, Kurzweil founded the Medical Learning Company. In 1999, Kurzweil created a hedge fund called "FatKat" (Financial Accelerating Transactions from Kurzweil Adaptive Technologies), which began trading in 2006. He has said that the ultimate aim is to improve the performance of FatKat's A.I. investment software program, enhancing its ability to recognize patterns in "currency fluctuations and stock-ownership trends". In his 1999 book The Age of Spiritual Machines, Kurzweil predicted that computers would one day be better than humans at making profitable investment decisions. In June 2005, Kurzweil introduced the "Kurzweil-National Federation of the Blind Reader" (K-NFB Reader)—a pocket-sized device consisting of a digital camera and computer unit. Like the Kurzweil Reading Machine of almost 30 years before, the K-NFB Reader is designed to aid blind people by reading written text aloud. The newer machine is portable and scans text through digital camera images, while the older machine is large and scans text through flatbed scanning.

In December 2012, Google hired Kurzweil in a full-time position to "work on new projects involving machine learning and language processing". Google co-founder Larry Page personally hired him. Page and Kurzweil agreed on a one-sentence job description: "to bring natural language understanding to Google". Kurzweil received a Technical Grammy Award on February 8, 2015, specifically for his invention of the Kurzweil K250.

Kurzweil has joined the Alcor Life Extension Foundation, a cryonics company. His plan is that, in the event of his death, he will be perfused with cryoprotectants, vitrified in liquid nitrogen, and stored at an Alcor facility in the hope that future medical technology will be able to revive him.

=== Personal life ===
Kurzweil is agnostic about the existence of a soul. Of the possibility of divine intelligence, Kurzweil has said: "Does God exist? I would say 'Not yet.'" He married Sonya Rosenwald Kurzweil in 1975. Sonya is a psychologist in private practice in Newton, Massachusetts; she works with women, children, parents, and families. She holds faculty appointments at Harvard Medical School and William James College in graduate education in psychology. Her research interests and publications are in psychotherapy practice. She also serves as an active overseer at Boston Children's Museum. Ray and Sonya Kurzweil have a son, Ethan, a venture capitalist, and a daughter, Amy, a cartoonist.

=== Creative approach ===
Kurzweil has said: "I realize that most inventions fail not because the R&D department can't get them to work, but because the timing is wrong‍—‌not all of the enabling factors are at play where they are needed. Inventing is a lot like surfing: you have to anticipate and catch the wave at just the right moment." For the past several decades, Kurzweil's most effective and common approach to doing creative work has been conducted during a lucid dreamlike state immediately preceding his waking state. He claims to have constructed inventions, solved algorithmic, business strategy, organizational, and interpersonal problems, and written speeches in this state.

== Books ==
Kurzweil's first book, The Age of Intelligent Machines, was published in 1990. It discusses the history of computer artificial intelligence (AI) and forecasts future developments. Other AI experts contribute heavily to the book in the form of essays. The Association of American Publishers named it the Most Outstanding Computer Science Book of 1990.

In 1993, Kurzweil published a book on nutrition, The 10% Solution for a Healthy Life. Its main idea is that high levels of fat intake are the cause of many health disorders common in the U.S., and thus that cutting fat consumption to 10% of total calories consumed is optimal for most people. In 1999, Kurzweil published The Age of Spiritual Machines, which further elucidates his theories of the future of technology, which stem from his analysis of long-term trends in biological and technological evolution. Much emphasis is on the likely course of AI development, along with the future of computer architecture. Kurzweil's next book, Fantastic Voyage: Live Long Enough to Live Forever (2004), returns to human health and nutrition and is co-authored by Terry Grossman, a medical doctor and specialist in alternative medicine.

The Singularity Is Near, published in 2005, was made into a movie starring Pauley Perrette. In 2007, Ptolemaic Productions acquired the rights to The Singularity Is Near, The Age of Spiritual Machines, and Fantastic Voyage, including the rights to film Kurzweil's life and ideas for the documentary film Transcendent Man, directed by Barry Ptolemy. Transcend: Nine Steps to Living Well Forever, a follow-up to Fantastic Voyage, was released in 2009. Kurzweil's book How to Create a Mind was released in 2012. In it he describes his Pattern Recognition Theory of Mind, the theory that the neocortex is a hierarchical system of pattern recognizers, and argues that emulating this architecture in machines could lead to artificial superintelligence.

Kurzweil's first novel, Danielle: Chronicles of a Superheroine, follows a girl who uses her intelligence and her friends' help to tackle real-world problems. It follows a structure akin to the scientific method. Chapters are organized as year-by-year episodes from Danielle's childhood and adolescence. The book comes with companion materials, A Chronicle of Ideas and How You Can Be a Danielle, that provide real-world context. It was released in 2019.

Kurzweil's latest book, The Singularity Is Nearer: When We Merge with AI, was published in 2024.

== Films ==
In 2010, Kurzweil wrote and co-produced the film The Singularity Is Near: A True Story About the Future, directed by Anthony Waller and based in part on the book The Singularity Is Near. Part fiction, part nonfiction, the film blends interviews with 20 big thinkers (such as Marvin Minsky) with a narrative story that illustrates some of Kurzweil's key ideas, including a computer avatar (Ramona) who saves the world from self-replicating microscopic robots. An independent, feature-length documentary, Transcendent Man, was made about Kurzweil, his life, and his ideas.

In 2010, an independent documentary film, Plug & Pray, premiered at the Seattle International Film Festival, in which Kurzweil and one of his major critics, Joseph Weizenbaum, argue about the benefits of eternal life. Independent filmmaker Doug Wolens's feature-length documentary film The Singularity (2012) showcases Kurzweil.

== Music ==
=== Our Lady Peace ===
On December 12, 2000, Columbia Records released the Canadian alternative rock band Our Lady Peace's album Spiritual Machines. Although not initially so intended, the project evolved into a conceptual interpretation of Kurzweil's 1999 book The Age of Spiritual Machines. The band emailed Kurzweil to ask permission to use the title of his book for their project. Kurzweil's excitement at the prospect prompted them to invite him to record spoken excerpts from his book for the album. As a result, short tracks of spoken dialog by Kurzweil are interspersed among the album's songs. The Kurzweil K250 keyboard is also used on the album.

== Views ==
=== The Law of Accelerating Returns ===
In his 1999 book The Age of Spiritual Machines, Kurzweil proposed "The Law of Accelerating Returns", according to which the rate of change in a wide variety of evolutionary systems (including the growth of technologies) tends to increase exponentially. His 2001 essay "The Law of Accelerating Returns" proposes an extension of Moore's law to a wide variety of technologies and argues in favor of John von Neumann's concept of a technological singularity.

=== Genetics, nanotechnology, and robotics ===
Kurzweil was working with the Army Science Board in 2006 to develop a rapid response system to deal with the possible abuse of biotechnology. He suggested that a bioterrorist could use the same technologies that empower us to reprogram biology away from cancer and heart disease to reprogram a virus to be more deadly, communicable, and stealthy. But he suggests we have the scientific tools to defend against such an attack, much as we defend against computer software viruses. Kurzweil has testified before Congress on nanotechnology, saying that it has the potential to solve serious global problems such as poverty, disease, and climate change: "Nanotech Could Give Global Warming a Big Chill".

In media appearances, Kurzweil has stressed nanotechnology's extreme potential dangers but argues that, in practice, progress cannot be stopped because that would require a totalitarian system, and any attempt to do so would drive dangerous technologies underground and deprive responsible scientists of the tools needed for defense. He suggests that the proper place of regulation is to ensure that technological progress proceeds safely and quickly but does not deprive the world of profound benefits. He said: "To avoid dangers such as unrestrained nanobot replication, we need relinquishment at the right level and to place our highest priority on the continuing advance of defensive technologies, staying ahead of destructive technologies. An overall strategy should include a streamlined regulatory process, a global program of monitoring for unknown or evolving biological pathogens, temporary moratoriums, raising public awareness, international cooperation, software reconnaissance, and fostering values of liberty, tolerance, and respect for knowledge and diversity."

=== Health and aging ===
Kurzweil admits that he cared little for his health until age 35, when he was found to suffer from a glucose intolerance, an early form of type II diabetes (a major risk factor for heart disease). He then found a doctor, Terry Grossman, with whom he developed an unconventional regimen involving hundreds of pills, chemical intravenous treatments, red wine, and various other methods to attempt to extend his lifespan. In 2007, Kurzweil was ingesting "250 supplements, eight to 10 glasses of alkaline water and 10 cups [~2,400 mL] of green tea" every day and drinking several glasses of red wine a week in an effort to "reprogram" his biochemistry. By 2008, he had reduced the number of supplement pills to 150. By 2015, Kurzweil further reduced his daily pill regimen to 100 pills.

Kurzweil asserts that in the future, everyone will live forever. In a 2013 interview, he said that in 15 years, medical technology could add more than a year to one's remaining life expectancy for each year that passes, and we could then "outrun our own deaths". He has supported the SENS Research Foundation's approach to finding a way to repair aging damage, and has encouraged the general public to hasten their research by donating.

=== Futurism and transhumanism ===
Kurzweil's standing as a futurist and transhumanist has led to his involvement in several singularity-themed organizations. In 2004, he joined the advisory board of the Machine Intelligence Research Institute. In 2005, he joined the scientific advisory board of the Lifeboat Foundation. On May 13, 2006, Kurzweil was the first speaker at the Singularity Summit at Stanford University in Palo Alto, California. In 2013, he was the keynote speaker at the Research, Innovation, Start-up and Employment (RISE) international conference in Seoul. In 2009, Kurzweil, Google, and the NASA Ames Research Center announced the creation of the Singularity University training center for corporate executives and government officials. The university's self-described mission is to "assemble, educate and inspire a cadre of leaders who strive to understand and facilitate the development of exponentially advancing technologies and apply, focus and guide these tools to address humanity's grand challenges". Using Vernor Vinge's Singularity concept as a foundation, the university offered its first nine-week graduate program to 40 students in 2009.

Kurzweil views the human body as a system of thousands of "programs" and believes that understanding all their functions could be the key to building truly sentient AI.

=== Universal basic income ===
Kurzweil advocates universal basic income (UBI), arguing that progress in science and technology will lead to an abundance of virtually free resources, enabling every citizen to live without the need to work: "We are clearly headed toward a situation where everyone can live very well". According to him, the major hurdle to introducing UBI is not its feasibility, but political will, which is slowly emerging. In a 2018 TED Talk, he predicted that "in the early 2030s, we'll have universal basic income in the developed world, and worldwide by the end of the 2030s. You'll be able to live very well on that. The primary concern will be meaning and purpose."

== Predictions ==
=== Past predictions ===
Kurzweil's first book, The Age of Intelligent Machines, presents his ideas about the future. Written from 1986 to 1989, it was published in 1990. Building on Ithiel de Sola Pool's "Technologies of Freedom" (1983), Kurzweil claims to have forecast the dissolution of the Soviet Union due to new technologies such as cellular phones and fax machines disempowering authoritarian governments by removing state control of the flow of information. In the book, Kurzweil also extrapolates trends in improving computer chess software performance, predicting that computers will beat the best human players "by the year 2000". In May 1997, IBM's Deep Blue computer defeated World Champion Garry Kasparov in a well-publicized match.

Kurzweil foresaw the explosive growth in worldwide Internet use that began in the 1990s. When The Age of Intelligent Machines was published, there were only 2.6 million Internet users in the world, and the medium was unreliable, difficult to use, and deficient in content. He also said that the Internet would explode not only in the number of users but in content, eventually granting users access "to international networks of libraries, data bases, and information services". Additionally, Kurzweil claims to have correctly foreseen that the preferred mode of Internet access would be through wireless systems, and estimated that this development would become practical for widespread use in the early 21st century. In October 2010, Kurzweil released his report "How My Predictions Are Faring" in PDF format, analyzing the predictions he made in his books The Age of Intelligent Machines, The Age of Spiritual Machines, and The Singularity is Near. Of the 147 predictions, Kurzweil claimed that 115 were "entirely correct", 12 were "essentially correct", 17 were "partially correct", and three were "wrong". Combining the "entirely" and "essentially" correct, Kurzweil's claimed accuracy rate comes to 86%.

In Newsweek magazine, Daniel Lyons criticized Kurzweil for some of his incorrect predictions for 2009, such as that the economy would continue to boom, that a U.S. company would have a market capitalization of more than $1 trillion, that a supercomputer would achieve 20 petaflops, that speech recognition would be in widespread use, and that cars would drive themselves using sensors installed in highways. To the charge that a 20-petaflop supercomputer had not been produced, Kurzweil responded that he considered Google a giant supercomputer, and that it was indeed capable of 20 petaflops.

Forbes magazine claimed that Kurzweil's predictions for 2009 were mostly inaccurate, with seven incorrect, four partially correct, and one correct. For example, Kurzweil predicted, "The majority of text is created using continuous speech recognition", which was not the case.

=== Future predictions ===
In 1999, Kurzweil published a second book, The Age of Spiritual Machines, which explains his futurist ideas in more depth. In it, he says that with radical life extension will come radical life enhancement. He says he is confident that within 10 years we will have the option to spend some of our time in 3D virtual environments that appear just as real as reality, but that they will not yet be able to directly interact with our nervous system. He expounds on his prediction about nanorobotics, claiming that within 20 years millions of blood-cell sized devices, called nanobots, will fight disease inside our bodies and improve our memory and cognitive abilities. Kurzweil also believes a machine will pass the Turing test by 2029. He says that humans will be a hybrid of biological and non-biological intelligence that becomes increasingly dominated by its non-biological component. In Transcendent Man, he writes, "We humans are going to start linking with each other and become a metaconnection; we will all be connected and omnipresent, plugged into a global network that is connected to billions of people and filled with data."

In 2008, Kurzweil said in an expert panel in the National Academy of Engineering that solar power will scale up to produce all of humanity's energy needs in 20 years. According to him, we need to capture only 1 part in 10,000 of the energy from the Sun that hits Earth's surface to meet all of humanity's energy needs.

== Reception ==
Kurzweil was called "the ultimate thinking machine" by Forbes in 1998 and a "restless genius" by The Wall Street Journal in 1989. PBS included him as one of 16 "revolutionaries who made America", along with other inventors of the past two centuries. Inc. magazine ranked Kurzweil eighth among the "most fascinating" entrepreneurs in the U.S. and called him "Edison's rightful heir". Bill Gates called him "the best at predicting the future of artificial intelligence".

Although technological singularity is a popular concept in science fiction, authors such as Neal Stephenson and Bruce Sterling have voiced skepticism about its plausibility. Sterling expressed his view in a 2004 talk at the Long Now Foundation called The Singularity: Your Future as a Black Hole. Other prominent AI thinkers and computer scientists who have criticized Kurzweil's projections include Daniel Dennett, Rodney Brooks, David Gelernter, and Paul Allen.

In the December 2010 issue of IEEE Spectrum, John Rennie criticized Kurzweil for several predictions that did not come true by the originally predicted date. Sun Microsystems co-founder Bill Joy agrees with Kurzweil's timeline of future progress, but thinks that technologies such as AI, nanotechnology, and advanced biotechnology will create a dystopian world. Lotus Development Corporation founder Mitch Kapor has called the notion of a technological singularity "intelligent design for the IQ 140 people... This proposition that we're heading to this point at which everything is going to be just unimaginably different—it's fundamentally, in my view, driven by a religious impulse. And all of the frantic arm-waving can't obscure that fact for me." Cognitive scientist Douglas Hofstadter has said of Kurzweil's and Hans Moravec's books: "It's an intimate mixture of rubbish and good ideas, and it's very hard to disentangle the two, because these are smart people; they're not stupid." VR pioneer Jaron Lanier has called Kurzweil's ideas "cybernetic totalism" and outlined his view on the culture surrounding Kurzweil's predictions in an essay for the Edge Foundation called "One Half of a Manifesto". Physicist and futurist Theodore Modis claims that Kurzweil's thesis of a technological singularity lacks scientific rigor.

== Awards and honors ==
- First place in the 1965 International Science Fair for inventing the classical music synthesizing computer
- The 1978 Grace Murray Hopper Award from the Association for Computing Machinery. The award is given annually to one "outstanding young computer professional" and is accompanied by a $35,000 prize. Kurzweil won it for his invention of the Kurzweil Reading Machine.
- In 1986, Kurzweil was named Honorary chairman for Innovation of the White House Conference on Small Business by President Ronald Reagan.
- In 1987, Kurzweil received an Honorary Doctorate of Music from Berklee College of Music.
- In 1988, Kurzweil was named Inventor of the Year by MIT and the Boston Museum of Science.
- In 1990, Kurzweil was voted Engineer of the Year by the over one million readers of Design News Magazine and received their third annual Technology Achievement Award.
- The 1995 Dickson Prize in Science
- The 1998 "Inventor of the Year" award from the Massachusetts Institute of Technology
- The 1999 National Medal of Technology. This is the highest award the President of the United States can bestow upon individuals and groups for pioneering new technologies, and the President dispenses the award at his discretion. Bill Clinton presented Kurzweil with the National Medal of Technology during a White House ceremony in recognition of Kurzweil's development of computer-based technologies to help people with disabilities.
- In 2000, Kurzweil received the Golden Plate Award of the American Academy of Achievement.
- The 2000 Telluride Tech Festival Award of Technology. Two other individuals also received the same honor that year. The award is presented yearly to people who "exemplify the life, times and standard of contribution of Tesla, Westinghouse and Nunn."
- The 2001 Lemelson-MIT Prize for a lifetime of developing technologies to help people with disabilities and to enrich the arts. Only one is awarded each year – it is given to highly successful, mid-career inventors. A$500,000 award accompanies the prize.
- Kurzweil was inducted into the National Inventors Hall of Fame in 2002 for inventing the Kurzweil Reading Machine.
- The Arthur C. Clarke Lifetime Achievement Award on April 20, 2009, for lifetime achievement as an inventor and futurist in computer-based technologies
- In 2011, Kurzweil was named a Senior Fellow of the Design Futures Council.
- In 2013, Kurzweil was honored as a Silicon Valley Visionary Award winner on June 26 by SVForum.
- In 2014, Kurzweil was honored with the American Visionary Art Museum's Grand Visionary Award on January 30.
- In 2014, Kurzweil was inducted as an Eminent Member of IEEE-Eta Kappa Nu.
- Kurzweil has received 20 honorary doctorates in science, engineering, music and humane letters from Rensselaer Polytechnic Institute, Hofstra University and other leading colleges and universities, as well as honors from three U.S. presidents – Clinton, Reagan and Johnson.
- Kurzweil has received seven national and international film awards including the CINE Golden Eagle Award and the gold medal for Science Education from the International Film and TV Festival of New York.
- He was included in Time 100 AI list in 2024.

== Bibliography ==
=== Non-fiction ===
- The Age of Intelligent Machines (1990)
- The 10% Solution for a Healthy Life (1993)
- The Age of Spiritual Machines (1999)
- Fantastic Voyage: Live Long Enough to Live Forever (2004), co-authored with Dr. Terry Grossman
- The Singularity Is Near (2005)
- Transcend: Nine Steps to Living Well Forever (2009), co-authored with Dr. Terry Grossman
- How to Create a Mind (2012)
- The Singularity Is Nearer (2024)

=== Fiction ===
- Danielle: Chronicles of a Superheroine (2019)

== See also ==
- Paradigm shift
- Simulated reality
