= Healthy in Paranoid Times =

Studio album by Our Lady Peace
- Released: August 30, 2005
- Recorded: May 2003 – May 2005
- Studios: Plantation, Haiku; Village Recorder, West Los Angeles; Henson, Hollywood; Royaltone, Los Angeles; Satellite Park, Malibu; The Boat, Silver Lake; Metalworks, Mississauga
- Genres: Alternative rock; post-grunge
- Length: 45:21
- Label: Columbia
- Producers: Bob Rock, Our Lady Peace, except for "Al Genina", produced by Raine Maida

Our Lady Peace chronology
Live (2003)	Healthy in Paranoid Times (2005)	A Decade (2006)

Singles from Healthy in Paranoid Times
- 1. "Where Are You" Released: June 29, 2005; 2. "Angels/Losing/Sleep" Released: October 8, 2005; 3. "Will the Future Blame Us" Released: April 14, 2006

Healthy in Paranoid Times is the sixth studio album by Canadian rock band Our Lady Peace, released on August 30, 2005 by Columbia Records, as the band's final album for the label. The disc was released on a standard CD as well as a DualDisc, with the reverse side containing a documentary on the making of the album. The album fared well in both Canada and the U.S., but didn't match up to the success of its 2002 predecessor, Gravity. The first single was "Where Are You", released in Canada during June 2005 and released in the United States a month later. The second and third singles were "Angels/Losing/Sleep" and "Will the Future Blame Us", respectively.

According to the album's liner notes, Healthy was recorded in 1165 days at ten different studios. 2000 hours were spent both discussing and playing music and 43 songs were written and recorded. Over 6000 GB of hard drive space was used for the recording. The band's inability to choose which songs (and which versions of songs) they were satisfied with caused them to prolong recording and push back the release date several times, causing much tension within the group. Every one involved with the project unofficially quit at least once and the band came close to breaking up several times during the process.

Healthy in Paranoid Times has a lighter sound and tone, and is less metaphorical than Our Lady Peace's pre-2002 releases. The second single, however, "Angels/Losing/Sleep" has vocalist Raine Maida singing at a higher pitch, making the jarred, falsetto-like voice Raine Maida and Our Lady Peace was formerly known for. Other songs, like "Boy", also have a lighter melody and vocals, instead of the heavier sounds on Gravity. The album mostly deals with current world events, and discusses issues such as war and the current state of the world, rather than the social and relationship themes featured on Gravity; however, some songs still features the social and relationship themes, which can be found in songs like "Picture" and "Apology". It has been classified as a politically charged album. In particular, the song "Wipe That Smile Off Your Face" was confirmed to be written about George W. Bush.

== Background and writing ==
The members of Our Lady Peace began writing new material together soon after the Gravity tour began. In October 2002 they returned briefly to Bob Rock's Maui studio to record two unfinished songs from the Gravity sessions that were planned to be released on a soundtrack, which never happened. "Working with him on that soundtrack song was just another reaffirmation for us how well we work together," Maida stated in an October interview. "With the way this band has grown, and the way we've come to trust Bob, it would be ridiculous for us to look for another producer now. When we're all together, we feel like we can do anything. We have to go at least one more round with him. I think we just scratched the surface of what we can do together." By the end of 2002, the band was eager to re-enter the studio in Maui to begin laying down demos with Rock. Two new songs, "Not Afraid" and "Talk is Cheap" were premiered in March 2003 while touring in Europe with Avril Lavigne.

They began working more quickly on material then they ever had. "We write songs in like five minutes now," Maida said at the time, "The energy's there." For the first time, new guitarist Steve Mazur was included in the songwriting process, having not been in the band yet while Gravity was being written. "On this record we really tried to write together," Maida says. "It’s easy for me to come in with a song, say here it is, lets go record it and it’ll be done in a couple of days. But when you have to sit in your rehearsal hall and you wait for that magic to happen, well, it doesn’t always happen right away, but that was the M.O. for this record and it worked."

== Recording and production ==
So it took forever to find another eight or nine songs that we felt could live up to those three. That’s basically what caused all the pain and strife because there’s a lot of it in this record. There’s a lot of walking out. A lot of arguments. A lot of talking about music instead of playing music. It was really interesting to see the process compared to any other record we’d made where you go into the studio for ten weeks and come out and the record’s finished. This was so far away from that.

— Raine Maida, on the issues with recording Healthy...

The band returned to Rock's Plantation Studios in Hawaii in May 2003 to begin the first recording sessions for the album. Their intention was to record an album even more simplified than Gravity and even closer in sound to what they sounded like live, an overall different record. "I think we all knew going into it that it was an important record for us," said Duncan Coutts. "I think that when you get more than ten years into a band, It has to be a rebirth for us. We didn't want to go and remake any of our past records." In one month, they recorded 12 songs live off the floor, most in two or three takes each. Following these sessions, several of the songs including "Walking in Circles", "No Warning" and "Wipe That Smile Off your Face" were premiered live. After touring concluded for the year, the band was set to finish the album that October in time for a January 2004 release. While satisfied with the recorded material at first, with time the band became more critical of it and decided they would only be demos. They felt strongly about the songs "Picture", "Will the Future Blame Us?" and "Angels/Losing/Sleep" but felt that the rest of the songs didn't live up to them. "Even though we loved the energy of what we'd done, not enough of the songs were making the hair stand up on the back of your neck and so we realized that we needed to do more work," bass player Duncan Coutts explained. The album's projected release was pushed to June and then August as recording continued.

The album's mood and direction would shift again when Maida traveled to Sudan and Darfur to shoot a documentary with War Child in the middle of recording. "We were there for a couple of weeks, and we came back from that and went right back into the studio, and it was like: 'God, this song sucks. I’m not saying that anymore.' You start reflecting on lyrics and any message you’re trying to get out there, and it really altered everything again." The band recorded in six-week spurts, traveling between studios in Toronto, Los Angeles and Maui, recording and re-recording more and more songs. With no deadline from the record company, they kept recording and gaining more perspective. "We'd get together, write, record, take two weeks off, go back in and we ended up doing that on and off for the last two-and-a-half or three years," By this time, over forty songs were in the can including "Picture", "Don't Ask Why" (Where Are You), "Holy Ghost" (Angels/Losing/Sleep) and "Vampires", which was briefly considered for the album's title. The sessions became strained at times as the band couldn't figure out where the album was going. "We had so many songs," said Taggart, "and we just started to go crazy." Many songs went through multiple incarnations such as "Boy", which caused the band a lot of stress and took over three weeks to break down and re-record. They were also butting heads with their producer. "There were some fucking horrible sessions," Maida admitted.

A particularly brutal session took place at Satellite Park Studio in Malibu. "It was like a month of, we'd basically broken up, fired Bob [Rock], he quit and then there were those times where it was like, 'Oh my God, that's magic, how do we get more of that?'" Maida even quit once after firing Rock at a group meeting. "For me that was pretty much it. I was pretty much done with the band . . . It was really dark," Maida Noted. Pressure was also coming from the band's management and the record company, who continued to fund the band's sessions. Raine commented, “I think we were at, like, 35 songs, and we all sat in a room and said, ‘Yeah, but there’s only eight that we all like.’ Everyone's really frustrated.... And I think Bob had even lost perspective at this point. We’re sitting there in this shitty little studio in Malibu, and it just got a little aggressive and agitated in the room."

"It was never a personal thing. It was never, 'I don't want be in a band with you anymore.' It was more, what the hell are we doing? We have to do this faster or we're going to go insane. You can talk up and down about who stormed out or when they stormed out, but the whole point of it is that we kind of lost focus. It felt like we could've been in the studio for another six years and be at the same point. If we didn't finish this record, we would've been pretty bitter people.

— Jeremy Taggart, on fighting about Healthy...

The album's release date was once again pushed back to January or March 2005 while a final recording session was held in Mississauga, Ontario to re-record most of the songs that would make the album. During these sessions, guitarist Joel Shearer of the band Pedestrian visited with them and contributed his guitar playing to several tracks. "He [Shearer] came in the last couple of sessions to help us out and to get a little different guitar perspective on there." Duncan Coutts explained, "We had a couple of our friends that came and played. One guy, Adam, played a little B3, and Jason Lader played on that song. He was also our Pro Tools engineer for part of it—not the whole thing, part of it, doing Pro Tools editing. He played on a song that never made the record." Coutts recounted the atmosphere of the final recording session. "It was kind of like a musical community, like friends and musicians would stop by and people that were working there, part of the recording team. Bob sang vocals; Bob played guitar. Eric Helmkamp, Bob’s assistant engineer and Pro Tools engineer—he sang on some stuff. It was just about a musical team." These sessions brought the whole project back into focus for the band, easing many of the tensions that had arisen earlier. According to Coutts, "I don't know what would have happened if not for that time."

After all was said and done, Our Lady Peace had recorded 45 songs at ten different studios, twelve of which they finally felt satisfied with. The album was mixed by Randy Staub at the studios in Maui as well as at The Warehouse Studio in Vancouver, B.C. Mastering was done by George Marino at Sterling Sound in New York City. The album's final release date was assured to be August 30, 2005, two and a half years after recording began.

== Themes ==
The raw and unpolished sound of Healthy in Paranoid Times is attributed to the previous album Bob Rock produced, Metallica's 2003 album St. Anger which was recorded just before Healthy. According to Raine, Bob said that a polished record full of overdubs like Gravity was not where his head was at the time and the band agreed. "What Bob Rock did with Metallica on the 'St. Anger' record was just record everything - no Pro Tools, no overdubbing, no fixing stuff, and then pick the best pieces and put them together," says Maida. "We're trying to take that approach, where it's that raw."

In a June 2003 interview, Maida explained that lyrically, his words on the album would follow the music and would be very much a product of the times. "I think it's going to be a little more raw, a little bit more in your face, not a lot of relationship stuff," he says, noting that fans would get a preview of a couple of the tracks, "Wipe That Smile Off Your Face" and "Walking In Circles", on the current tour. "My head, with what's going on in the world and being able to reflect on all the (stuff) that I've done in the last few years in terms of going to Iraq, working very closely with War Child, I'm in that mode. I'm not angry, but kind of frustrated." After observing the plight in Sudan and Darfur, Maida returned with a different outlook on his lyrics and became more outspoken. “There were some [lyrics] that were way too over the top and preachy,” he admits, “and I had to pull a lot of stuff back. This isn’t a solo record for me, this is Our Lady Peace, so I have three people that I contend with in terms of how far I can go with saying things.” Bassist Coutts added "A lot of things he was talking about lyrically were things that we discussed as a band in spending all that time together. I also think that becoming a father also let him deal with issues that he hadn't dealt with before. Although there are some of the darkest lyrics ever on this record, I think there are also some very positive ones as well." The content of the album's lyrics have led it to be classified as a politically charged album, which the band hasn't denied.

The title of the album is derived from a lyric from the bridge of the song "Don't Stop". Taggart described the rationale behind choosing that title. "'Don’t Stop' was one of the last songs we recorded, and that one kinda summed up all the stuff we had gone through. Raine had just gotten back from Sudan, he was trying to compress all the things he’d experienced. The shock was going there and then coming back here and realizing they have happiness and hope with no material possessions, they live in mud huts. But they have what we want emotionally, you know."

The track "Where Are You" went through many changes and arrangements after being written including an entirely different chorus. The song was known as "The Best Day of Your Life" and "Where Are You (Best Day)" on advance copies of Healthy. "Apology" also morphed throughout recording. "The song 'Apology' for example was from the first demo sessions. We tried that song a year later completely differently ... way more up-tempo and it just didn't feel right. It didn't serve the song and what Raine was saying and how he was singing dictated how we were playing. I love all the songs on the record, but that was a very magical, musical moment because it was so organic the way that happened."

== Packaging and artwork ==
In January 2005, the band contacted Dallas, Texas based artist Grant Smith, whom the band had known for nine years, to paint an album cover for Healthy in Paranoid Times. The finished product was a 20-by-20 inch oil painting of a man sitting in a chair in an all-white room with his back facing the audience. The cover chosen was the ninth one he painted for the project. Smith discussed the inspiration for the cover after he visited the band at their Maui recording studio. "We talked about the world we live in and the issues that face our culture. Issues such as political propaganda, a sensationalist media, blind faith and micro-macrocosm were a few of the things we discussed. We liked the idea of a man with his back turned to the world, in a white blank room." The concept was further discussed on his web page. "Is the whiteness purity and peace that he seeks, or the stark cold white of a mental ward? "It's just a guy who has had enough, everything has gotten too heavy and he needs a break from it all. He hasn't given up or surrendered, just created an enlightened microcosm. The minimal white area surrounding the figure is more important than the figure itself, being that it can represent health or paranoia." The image is repeated on the disc itself.

Smith also painted a portrait of each member of the band. "Our Lady Peace asked me to do paintings of each band member. I wanted them to be inward, reflective, powerful and multilayered. The individual shapes on their faces represent the depth of the man. Raine asked me to paint a bandaged head representing the wounds that were accumulated in spending 3 years, recording over 50 tracks, and almost breaking up had on the band." These portraits were sold online from Our Lady Peace's website.

The album's liner notes contain no lyrics but a link to them online is given. Instead, it is filled with several photographs taken by John Wellman inside the abandoned Whitby Psychiatric Hospital in Whitby, Ontario. The small band photo on the back cover was taken by Charman Baehler at the Alexandria Hotel in Los Angeles. On the pages are lists of statistical events which occurred during the making of Healthy in Paranoid Times such as how many days, studios and gigabytes of storage space were used for recording as well as events in the world such as 9.8 million people having died from AIDS. The last page in the booklet lists several websites including War Child.ca and Adbusters.com among others. The album credits are placed on the CD's tray insert.

Art model Saul Fox (who appeared on the covers of the band's first four studio releases) re-enacted the image of this album for the cover of the band's 2006 retrospective album A Decade, though he is facing the audience and is wearing a fedora. He is also displaying the same facial expression from the cover of the band's 1999 album Happiness... Is Not a Fish That You Can Catch.

== Release ==
Healthy in Paranoid Times was internationally released on August 30, 2005 after multiple setbacks during recording. The album had been planned to be released as early as January 2004. The disc was released on a standard CD as well as a DualDisc, with the reverse side containing a documentary on the making of the album with interviews of Bob Rock and the band members. It was directed by Matt Skerritt.

=== Extended copy protection ===
In November 2005, it was revealed that Sony BMG was distributing albums with Extended Copy Protection, a controversial feature that automatically installed rootkit software on any Microsoft Windows machine upon insertion of the disc. In addition to preventing the CDs contents from being copied, it was also revealed that the software reported the users' listening habits back to Sony BMG and also exposed the computer to malicious attacks that exploited insecure features of the rootkit software. Though Sony refused to release a list of the affected CDs, the Electronic Frontier Foundation identified Healthy in Paranoid Times as one of the discs with the invasive software. As part of its settlement of the class action lawsuit filed against it, Sony BMG allowed customers to return copies of Healthy in Paranoid Times for new copies plus a cash payment. This album has been released with the Copy Control protection system in some regions.

== Reception ==
=== Commercial ===
Upon its release, Healthy in Paranoid Times peaked at #2 on the Canadian Albums Chart, selling 22,000 copies in its first week. The album also peaked at #45 on the Billboard 200 chart. The album peaked on both of these charts on September 17, 2005 after spending two weeks on. The album also reached #1 on Soundscan's Alternative albums chart. Two weeks prior to this (September 3), the lead-off single released from Healthy, "Where Are You", peaked at #28 on Billboard's Alternative Songs chart after riding the charts for nine weeks. Healthy in Paranoid Times was certified Platinum for the shipment of 100,000 units by the CRIA on January 6, 2006.

=== Critical ===
Professional ratings
Review scores
Source	Rating
Allmusic	2/5 stars
Bullz-Eye.com	3.5/5 stars
Circle 6 Magazine	(favorable)
Montreal Gazette	4/5 stars
PopMatters	5/10 stars
Shipwreck Island Studios	5/5 stars
Slant	2.5/5 stars
Sputnikmusic	4/5 stars
Stylus Magazine	D+
The Toronto Sun	3/5 stars

Healthy in Paranoid Times was met with mixed reviews. It was loved and hated by many critics who either called it the band's best work to date or their weakest. It was also called "their most sonically mature album to date." and their best album since Clumsy by Circle 6 Magazine. At the time, the band praised their own efforts on the album. Duncan Coutts said in an interview, "I think this is the closest we've ever come to achieving what we heard in our heads and got on (record). For us this is the most complete record, start to finish. Some of the other records had awesome moments, but I think this is as close as we feel we have gotten to getting a whole record exactly the way we wanted it."

In Johnny Loftus' Allmusic review of the album, he gives it two stars out of five and mentioning how the songs seem to drag on and that "the biggest problem with Healthy in Paranoid Times, besides its inflated thematic framework, is its lack of distinction." Mike Schiller from PopMatters gave the album five out of ten stars. While he called the album derivative and "unabashedly mainstream" he also said "For all of its awkward leanings, the melodies are catchy, and the beats are crisp and tight, popping out of the speakers and driving everything forward with authority."

Brian Mulligan from Richmond.com declared the album a "mixed bag" saying "Gone is the free-spirited vibe of past OLP offerings, as the band has infused "Healthy" with a continual political undercurrent that leaked in through the hiatus." and finishing with, "What you're left with is a band that alternates between sounding like a bunch of unified rockers and a group that's just not having any fun. It's a solid effort, but in the end, should it have been such hard work?"

Yuri Wuensch of the Edmonton Sun called the album "their weakest yet". He also explained that "Part of the album's problem is it's devoid of the aggressive energy that punctuated most of the band's older material. Healthy in Paranoid Times sounded like Our Lady Peace was descending into the greatest pitfall of all bands: balladry."

Brad Hilgers of Source echoed the band's sentiments by saying that the album was their most complete to date. "On Healthy In Paranoid Times, the band has written an impressive album from start to finish with very little filler." In Jordan Zivit's 4 star review of the album, he said that their struggle in the studio paid off. He specified that "Maida delivers his most considered - and poignant - vocals ever."

The album was arraigned by News Record reviewer Amanda Amselr who claimed that each song is worse than the one before it and called the album "a mere shell of the cult following they used to instill with their music." She concluded by saying "In listening to Healthy In Paranoid Times a sad realization that the pop disease had inflicted even the purest of bands and stirs a reminder of why Canadian bands usually fail to impress."

== Tour ==
The band's first performance in 2005 was at the Live 8 concert, Barrie, Ontario on July 2 where the song "Where Are You" was premiered in its final form. For this tour they were accompanied by guitarist Joel Shearer of the band Pedestrian. Leading up to the album's release, they toured several small clubs in the Los Angeles area "to work the bugs out" and help the band get a better feel for the songs. They then toured steadily across North America, opening two shows for The Rolling Stones, until October when a family member of a band member became ill and several shows had to be canceled. The band chose to play smaller venues on this tour rather than arenas because the sound quality was better. "And for us, this new record is one of those things where there are a lot of little guitar parts happening all over the place and little textures -- and we want to hear that stuff." A cross-Canadian tour continued through summer of 2006 with the final show being played at Rogers Centre in Toronto. The band entered a hiatus period after this while Maida worked on his solo album, The Hunters Lullaby. They wouldn't play live again until mid-2008.

== Track listing ==
All lyrics are written by Raine Maida; all music is composed by Our Lady Peace & Bob Rock.

No.	Title	Length
1.	"Angels/Losing/Sleep"	4:31
2.	"Will the Future Blame Us"	4:26
3.	"Picture"	3:35
4.	"Where Are You"	4:06
5.	"Wipe That Smile Off Your Face"	4:24
6.	"Love and Trust"	3:21
7.	"Boy"	4:35
8.	"Apology"	3:46
9.	"The World on a String"	3:25
10.	"Don't Stop"	3:45
11.	"Walking in Circles"	3:33
12.	"Al Genina (Leave the Light On)"	2:14

== Personnel ==
As listed in liner notes.

=== Musicians ===
- Duncan Coutts - bass guitar, background vocals
- Adam McDougall - B3 organ
- Raine Maida - vocals, acoustic guitar, conga drums
- Steve Mazur - guitars, piano, background vocals
- Bob Rock - guitar, piano, background vocals
- Joel Shearer - guitar
- Jeremy Taggart - drums, percussion

=== Artwork ===
- Chapman Baehler - band photograph
- Tom Chaggaris - album art concept
- Our Lady Peace - album art concept
- Grant Smith - cover art
- John Wellman - photography

=== Production ===
- Zach Blackstone - asst. mixer
- Ian Bodzasi - asst. engineer at Metalworks
- Richard Chyoa - recording engineer, digital engineering and editing
- Eric Helmkamp - recording engineer, digital engineering and editing
- Danny Kelb - Pro Tools & recording engineer at "The Boat"
- Kurt Kroeger - asst. engineer at Royaltone Studio
- Jason Lader - recording engineer, digital engineering and editing
- Raine Maida - production and mixing on "Al Genina (Leave the Light On)"
- George Marino - mastering
- Colin Neilson - asst. engineer at Metalworks
- Bob Rock - producer
- Randy Staub - mixing
- Jason Wormer - asst. engineer at Village Recorder
- German Villacosta - asst. engineer at Henson Recording Studios

== Non-album tracks ==
1. "Imagine" (John Lennon cover) - live version released on fan club CD, studio version released on Peace Songs, a War Child compilation

=== Studio outtakes ===
According to the album's liner notes, 43 songs were recorded for the HIPT sessions. The earliest songs played following the May 2003 sessions were "No Warning" and "Talk Is Cheap". "Not Afraid" was played at the 2004 Juno Awards and a studio version was released on a 3-track promo CD by Labatt Blue (albeit with completely different lyrics). The tracks "Kiss on the Mouth" and a demo track "Better Than Here" were released on their 2006 compilation album A Decade. A short clip of "Vampires" as well as the podcast on recording the song are available on the internet. The titles for the songs "End of the World", "Enemy", "Save Yourself", "Weight of the Lord" and "Hit the Wall" appeared on a set list seen the band's 2004 holiday video. Jeremy Taggart played a portion of the drums for "Hit the Wall" on The Dean Blundell Show. Even with all these titles known, 19 songs still remain unaccounted for. According to Coutts, the batch of songs recorded in Malibu, considered to be much darker than anything Our Lady Peace had ever recorded, were deleted and "will never see the light of day."

== Release history ==
Region	Date	Label	Format	Catalog
Canada	August 30, 2005	Columbia	CD	
Canada	August 30, 2005	Columbia	DualDisc	
United States	August 30, 2005	Columbia	CD	CK 94777
United States	August 30, 2005	Columbia	DualDisc	CN 94998
Europe	September 12, 2005	Columbia	CD	
United States	November 11, 2005 (re-issue)	Columbia	CD	82876 77899 2
France	December 13, 2005	Columbia	CD	

== Charts ==
Album

Chart (2005)	Peak position
Canadian Albums Chart	2
Soundscan Alternative Albums	1
Billboard Top 200	45
