= Spiritual Machines 2 =

Studio album by Our Lady Peace
- Released: October 29, 2021
- Recorded: 2018–2021
- Genre: Alternative rock; art rock
- Length: 40:27
- Label: Shelter Music Group (BMG)
- Producer: Dave Sitek

Our Lady Peace chronology
Somethingness (2018)	Spiritual Machines 2 (2021)

Singles from Spiritual Machines 2
- 1. "Stop Making Stupid People Famous" Released: June 25, 2021; 2. "Future Disease" Released: October 8, 2021

Spiritual Machines 2 is the tenth studio album from Canadian alternative rock band Our Lady Peace, a sequel to their 2000 art rock concept album Spiritual Machines. The album was produced by Dave Sitek, and released through BMG's Shelter Music Group in the form of a non-fungible token (NFT) on October 29, 2021. All 500 NFTs were reported sold out in January 2022. A traditional release of the album happened on January 28 and a multi-media tour was scheduled to begin in June 2022.

The album, along with its thematic predecessor, is influenced by the 1999 Ray Kurzweil book The Age of Spiritual Machines. Spiritual Machines 2 was inspired by Kurzweil following up in the 2020s on his predictions made in the 1990s. Spoken excerpts voiced by Kurzweil feature in the album, as they did in the original Spiritual Machines album. It is the first Our Lady Peace album to involve the participation of founding member and original guitarist Mike Turner since Gravity in 2002, and the first studio release to feature Saul Fox on its cover since the original Spiritual Machines album. During the band's mid-2022 tour, Kurzweil and Turner were "projected" into the performance space in real time in the form of hologram-like technology.

== Development and overview ==
The album was first announced in August 2020, with an expectation that it would be released around Fall 2021. Original artwork for the album was provided by Oli Goldsmith, who also created the album art for the 2000 album.

In June 2021, the band's official account on social media hinted that original co-founder and guitarist Mike Turner would be a featured guest on the album; Turner hadn't been associated with the band since his departure in December 2001, and was instrumental in the conception and development of the original Spiritual Machines album. Turner's return was confirmed by Raine Maida in a July 2021 Reddit AMA, and he is listed as a featured guest in the album's track list. Regarding Turner's return, Maida stated that making Spiritual Machines 2 without Turner wouldn't "be right".

The album's first single "Stop Making Stupid People Famous", featuring Nadya Tolokonnikova of Pussy Riot, was released on June 25, 2021. The second single, "Future Disease", was released on October 8, 2021.

== Track listing ==
The album contains 15 tracks, five of which include excerpts from Ray Kurzweil in a similar vein to what was done on the original Spiritual Machines album.

No.	Title	Notes	Length
1.	"RK1.Age of Spiritual Machines"		0:14
2.	"Stop Making Stupid People Famous" (featuring Pussy Riot)		3:01
3.	"Holes"		3:19
4.	"RK2.Consciousness"		0:29
5.	"The Message"		3:57
6.	"Wish You Well"	Follow-up to the song "Are You Sad?" from the original Spiritual Machines.	4:44
7.	"RK3.UBI"		0:22
8.	"Future Disease"		5:19
9.	"19 Days"		3:38
10.	"Run"		2:57
11.	"RK4.Escape Velocity" (featuring Emtee)		1:02
12.	"Simulation"		2:52
13.	"Good Die Young"		3:26
14.	"RK5.Turing Test"		0:16
15.	"Temporary Healing"		4:53

== Personnel ==
- Duncan Coutts – bass guitar, background vocals
- Raine Maida – vocals, lyricist
- Steve Mazur – guitar, background vocals
- Jason Pierce – drums, percussion
- Mike Turner – guitar, composer (track 11)
- David Andrew Sitek – production, composer
- Ray Kurzweil – narration
- Steve Fallone
- Nadezhda Tolokonnikova – vocals, composer (track 2)
- Matty Green

== Tour ==
The band announced a tour which began in Victoria, Canada, on June 6, 2022. Billed as The Wonderful Future Theatrical Experience, the tour includes Kurzweil speaking and interacting in real time through a video link, who along with founding guitarist Mike Turner, is projected on stage using holography, and with Mike Turner making an appearance with the band on select locations throughout the tour. The hologram technology is rendered by ARHT Media, a video company with headquarters in Toronto. Maida said that the band was interested in "pushing the boundaries of what a live show is".
