= Somethingness =

Studio album by Our Lady Peace
- Released: February 23, 2018
- Recorded: 2016–2018
- Genre: Alternative rock; art rock
- Length: 33:37
- Label: Warner Music Records
- Producer: Jason Lader

Our Lady Peace chronology
Curve (2012)	Somethingness (2018)	Spiritual Machines 2 (2021)

Singles from Somethingness
- 1. "Drop Me in the Water" Released: August 18, 2017

Somethingness is the ninth studio album by Canadian alternative rock band Our Lady Peace (OLP). Produced under the Warner Music Records label by Jason Lader, who also produced their preceding album Curve, this is the band's first studio album in nearly six years and it was promoted using the PledgeMusic platform, a website which facilitates musicians reaching out to their fans to market and distribute music.

It is the first OLP album to have been released in two separate volumes; Vol. 1 was released as an EP in August 2017, and the album as a whole was released on February 23, 2018, and contained all of the songs from Vol. 1. The album is the first not to feature original drummer Jeremy Taggart, who departed from the band in 2014, and is the first to feature Jason Pierce, who replaced Taggart in 2016.

== Track listing ==
The official track listing includes the four songs initially released as part of Vol. 1, "Drop Me in the Water", "Hiding Place for Hearts", "Falling into Place", and "Nice to Meet You".

No.	Title	Length
1.	"Head Down"	3:31
2.	"Nice to Meet You"	3:21
3.	"Ballad of a Poet"	3:58
4.	"Hiding Place for Hearts"	3:38
5.	"Drop Me in the Water"	4:03
6.	"Missing Pieces"	4:28
7.	"Falling into Place"	3:24
8.	"Let Me Live Again"	3:44
9.	"Last Train"	3:30

== Personnel ==
Information adapted from AllMusic credits listing database.

- Duncan Coutts – bass guitar, background vocals
- Raine Maida – vocals, lyricist
- Steve Mazur – guitar, background vocals
- Jason Pierce – drums, percussion
- Jason Lader – production, design, piano
- Spike Stent – mixing
- Brian Lucey – mastering

== Charts ==
Chart (2018)	Peak position
Canadian Albums (Billboard)	29
