= Playlist: The Very Best of Our Lady Peace =

The Very Best of Our Lady Peace

Greatest hits album by Our Lady Peace
- Released: March 31, 2009
- Recorded: 1992–2005
- Genre: Alternative rock, post-grunge, art rock
- Length: 64:06
- Label: Legacy, Columbia

Our Lady Peace chronology
A Decade (2006)	The Very Best of Our Lady Peace (2009)	Burn Burn (2009)

Professional ratings
Review scores
Source	Rating
Allmusic	3.5/5 stars

Playlist: The Very Best of Our Lady Peace is a compilation album consisting of select remastered recordings by alternative rock band Our Lady Peace. It is the band's second compilation album following A Decade, which was released in 2006.

Many popular favorites from Our Lady Peace, such as "Automatic Flowers", "4am", "One Man Army", "Is Anybody Home?", "Thief", "In Repair" and "Life", do not appear on the album. The album includes lesser-known band favorites including "Stealing Babies" and "The Wonderful Future". The album was released in the United States on March 31, 2009.

== Track listing ==
1. "Starseed" (from Naveed)
2. "Naveed" (from Naveed)
3. "Superman's Dead" (from Clumsy)
4. "Clumsy" (from Clumsy)
5. "Car Crash" (from Clumsy)
6. "Stealing Babies" (from Happiness... Is Not a Fish That You Can Catch)
7. "Are You Sad" (from Spiritual Machines)
8. "The Wonderful Future" (from Spiritual Machines)
9. "Somewhere Out There" (from Gravity)
10. "Innocent" (from Gravity)
11. "Not Enough" (from Gravity)
12. "Apology" (from Healthy in Paranoid Times)
13. "Angels/Losing/Sleep" (from Healthy in Paranoid Times)
14. "Wipe That Smile Off Your Face" (from Healthy in Paranoid Times)

== See also ==
- Our Lady Peace discography
  - A Decade
- Playlist (album series)
