= A Decade =

Greatest hits album by Our Lady Peace
- Released: November 21, 2006
- Recorded: 1993–2006
- Genre: Alternative rock; art rock; post-grunge
- Length: 75:07
- Label: Columbia

Our Lady Peace chronology
Healthy in Paranoid Times (2005)	A Decade (2006)	The Very Best of Our Lady Peace (2009)

Singles from A Decade
- 1. "Kiss on the Mouth" Released: September 2006

Professional ratings
Review scores
Source	Rating
Allmusic	4/5 stars
Slant	4/5 stars

A Decade is Canadian alternative rock band Our Lady Peace's first compilation album, released on November 21, 2006, in Canada, and November 28, 2006, in the United States. In addition to songs from the band's first six albums, the set included two unreleased songs, "Kiss on the Mouth" and "Better Than Here".

The Canadian release of the album includes a bonus DVD containing a feature-length concert/documentary directed by Rafael Ouellet and produced by Robi Levy. The film features interviews with the current band members, behind the scenes footage, and performances of the songs "Picture", "Thief", "Innocent", "Where Are You", "Wipe That Smile Off Your Face", and "Clumsy" shot on November 6, 2005, at Massey Hall in Toronto. It also includes a photo gallery, and discography with lyrics.

"4am" and "One Man Army" have been remixed from their original album versions.

"In Repair" and "Life" appear with narration from Ray Kurzweil's book The Age of Spiritual Machines, which inspired the album on which the two songs first appeared, Spiritual Machines. The narration on the version of "Life" issued here was not included on the original version from Spiritual Machines.

The first single from the album was "Kiss on the Mouth", released in Canada in September 2006.

== Track listing ==
No.	Title	Original Album	Length
1.	"Starseed"	Naveed (1994)
2.	"The Birdman"	Naveed
3.	"Naveed"	Naveed
4.	"Superman's Dead"	Clumsy (1997)
5.	"Clumsy"	Clumsy
6.	"4am" (remix)	Clumsy
7.	"One Man Army" (remix)	Happiness... Is Not a Fish That You Can Catch (1999)
8.	"Is Anybody Home?"	Happiness... Is Not a Fish That You Can Catch
9.	"Thief"	Happiness... Is Not a Fish That You Can Catch
10.	"In Repair"	Spiritual Machines (2000)
11.	"Life"	Spiritual Machines
12.	"Somewhere Out There"	Gravity (2002)
13.	"Innocent"	Gravity
14.	"Where Are You"	Healthy in Paranoid Times (2005)
15.	"Angels/Losing/Sleep"	Healthy in Paranoid Times
16.	"Will the Future Blame Us"	Healthy in Paranoid Times
17.	"Kiss on the Mouth"	previously unreleased
18.	"Better Than Here" (demo)	previously unreleased
19.	"Angels/Losing/Sleep" (Live in Montreal; iTunes bonus track)

== See also ==
- Our Lady Peace discography
- The Very Best of Our Lady Peace (their second compilation album)
