= Randy Staub =

Canadian recording engineer

- Origin: Canada
- Occupations: Recording engineer, mixing engineer

Randy Staub is a Canadian recording engineer. He has been nominated for the Juno Awards' "Recording Engineer of the Year" award 12 times. He won in 2002 for the songs "How You Remind Me" and "Too Bad" by Nickelback.

Staub also mixed Alice in Chains' fourth and fifth studio albums, Black Gives Way to Blue and The Devil Put Dinosaurs Here.

== Awards ==
=== Juno Awards ===
Year	Title	Recordings	Outcome
1992	Recording Engineer of the Year	"Enter Sandman" (Metallica) "Dollar In My Pocket" (Big House)	Nominated
1993	Recording Engineer of the Year	"Keep the Faith" (Bon Jovi) "Bed of Roses" (Bon Jovi)	Nominated
1997	Recording Engineer of the Year	"Until It Sleeps" (Metallica) "Hero of the Day" (Metallica)	Nominated
1998	Recording Engineer of the Year	"Volcano Girls" (Veruca Salt) "The Unforgiven" (Metallica)	Nominated
1999	Best Recording Engineer	"C'mon, C'mon, C'mon" (Bryan Adams) "Radio" (Copyright)	Nominated
2001	Best Recording Engineer	"Just Another Phase" (The Moffatts) "Antifreeze & Aeroplanes" (The Moffatts)	Nominated
2002	Best Recording Engineer	"How You Remind Me" (Nickelback) "Too Bad" (Nickelback)	Won
2003	Recording Engineer of the Year	"Somewhere Out There" (Our Lady Peace) "Innocent" (Our Lady Peace)	Nominated
2006	Recording Engineer of the Year	"Angels Losing Sleep" (Our Lady Peace) "Animals" (Nickelback)	Nominated
2009	Recording Engineer of the Year	"Something In Your Mouth" (Nickelback)	Nominated
2013	Recording Engineer of the Year	"When We Stand Together" (Nickelback) "What You Want" (Evanescence)	Nominated
2014	Recording Engineer of the Year	"Hollow" (Alice in Chains) "Be My Baby" (Michael Bublé)	Nominated
