= Gravity (Our Lady Peace album) =

Studio album by Our Lady Peace
- Released: June 18, 2002
- Recorded: November 2001 – February 2002 at Plantation Mixing and Recording, Haiku, Hawaii
- Genres: Alternative rock; post-grunge
- Length: 41:27
- Label: Columbia
- Producer: Bob Rock

Our Lady Peace chronology
| Spiritual Machines (2000) | Gravity (2002) | Live (2003) |

Singles from Gravity
- 1. "Somewhere Out There" Released: April 1, 2002; 2. "Innocent" Released: August 13, 2002

Alternative Cover
- Limited edition CD + DVD cover

Gravity is the fifth studio album by the Canadian rock band Our Lady Peace. It was released on June 18, 2002 by Columbia Records in North America. The album became a worldwide success, charting highly both in Canada and the United States with the hit singles "Somewhere Out There" and "Innocent".

Gravity was the first album to feature new guitarist Steve Mazur, who replaced founding member Mike Turner in 2002 after the latter's departure a month into recording. Despite this, Turner still appears on half the tracks on the album, having recorded parts for several songs prior to parting ways with the group. This was also their last album with supporting musician Jamie Edwards, who had performed on two prior albums and was briefly an official member, but left the band soon after the album's completion.

It was the band's first album made without the involvement of producer Arnold Lanni, who not only produced the band's previous four studio albums but helped co-write many of their songs. The band originally wanted Lanni to produce their fifth album but he was busy working with Simple Plan and the band instead chose notable hard rock producer Bob Rock, who would have a major influence on their change in musical direction. Originally conceived as a live album based on the Spiritual Machines tour that would include three new studio tracks, the band would accept Rock's offer to record a full studio album when his schedule opened up as a result of the ongoing struggles of his prior engagement, Metallica.

The album title, Gravity, was inspired by the chorus lyrics "Falling back to me, defying gravity" from the track "Somewhere Out There" and was also seen by the band as representing their return to simplicity after the heady concept of Spiritual Machines. At the time of the album's release, OLP drummer Jeremy Taggart said that Gravity was "by far [their] best album".

== Background and writing ==
After wrapping up the Spiritual Machines Tour in late 2001, Our Lady Peace were becoming restless and came dangerously close to breaking up as tensions that had simmered under the surface for years began to come to a head. Lead singer Raine Maida in particular was feeling limited by guitarist Mike Turner's abilities in the studio; frustrations that had been present since before the recording of their sophomore album Clumsy. Stunt musician and Blue Man Group alumnus Jamie Edwards would be brought into the fold following that album to augment their sound in the studio and on tour, particularly on guitar. They would (by most accounts) mutually decide to part ways with Turner following preliminary sessions for Gravity. Raine would later state in an interview, "I don't know if Mike was born to be a guitar player. The studio was a tough place for him and we were working too hard to make up for it – we felt like we were cheating ourselves. Four albums is way too fucking long to put up with that. I'm sure he'll do great things, just not with six-stringed instruments."

Most of the band figured that they had gone as far as they could go musically with Spiritual Machines. Looking to reinvigorate themselves and change directions, they sought a more stripped down sound as opposed to the multi-layered textures and heavy subject matter of their previous albums. It was this idea of simplifying that inspired the title of Gravity. Raine discussed the transition in a 2002 interview. "’Spiritual Machines’ was so out there in talking about the future and trying to perceive man turning into machine, it was very heavy. With this record...it kind of felt like we were being pulled back down to earth, hence the title. It's such a simple life out there [Hawaii, where most of Gravity was recorded] and because of that the album was just based around living day to day rather than looking too far ahead. In that sense ‘Gravity’ is pretty much the opposite of ‘Spiritual Machines’. None of our other albums had been concept records, so it was the right time for us to get away from that whole philosophy. Because of that ‘Gravity’ is probably the most basic album we’ve made since our first."

Although Raine Maida had begun living in Los Angeles, The band came together in Toronto to start writing new material towards the end of touring for Spiritual Machines. They did it this time without the usual help of producer Arnold Lanni, who at the time was working with fellow Canadian band and management-mates Simple Plan on their debut album, No Pads, No Helmets...Just Balls. Jamie Edwards was credited for the only time as a songwriter on this album and briefly became an official member of the band, but would quit just as suddenly before its release. Three songs written by the band with Turner made the record but most were written by solely by Maida during the 2001 holiday season following Turner's departure. Steve Mazur's late official entry into the band meant he took no part in songwriting.

== Recording and production ==
For this album, Our Lady Peace would for the first time seek a new producer rather than long-time collaborator Arnold Lanni to help with their search for a new sound. According to the band, it was Lanni's idea for them to pursue a new venue lest they regret not trying other producers later on. After visiting with several producers in Los Angeles including Josh Abraham, the band seized the opportunity to work with Bob Rock because they liked his work with artists such as Metallica and American Hi-Fi as well as his general passion for music. Raine was particularly convinced he wanted to work with Rock after watching A Year and a Half in the Life of Metallica, the documentary about the making of the Black Album. In the studio, they would even record with the same guitars and amplifiers used by Metallica as well as Pete Townshend and the Cult. They first visited Rock's Maui studio in September 2001 to meet him and even wrote and recorded a song while there.

They returned to Hawaii in November 2001 after their last live show of the season at Music without Borders. They had initially booked ten days of studio time that month to record three tracks that would be included on a live album based on the Spiritual Machines tour. They began recording on the day of their arrival, laying down the initial tracks for "A Story About a Girl", which was written on the spot within 20 minutes after Raine heard Duncan and Jeremy tuning up in the next room. According to Taggart, the making of that song set the pace for the whole album. "He saw us as a rock band as soon as we got there, and the way we recorded it was live off the floor as a rock band as opposed to layering things," Maida stated. "He was a great leader who got the best out of us immediately". Metallica was originally scheduled to begin work on a new album with Rock in the following months but this was postponed when front man James Hetfield checked himself into rehab for alcohol abuse. Rock then asked the band if they would like to work on an entire album, which they accepted.

Following the preliminary recording sessions in Maui, Mike Turner left the band in December 2001 after having recorded rhythm guitar parts for several songs that would appear on the album. Band members in interviews said that he and the band weren't seeing eye to eye anymore but according to official press releases the split was amicable. Duncan Coutts said of the split, "We weren't allowing him to do what he really wanted to do, and he wasn't playing what we wanted to hear. ... This recording process magnified that, but it was a long time coming." The remaining band members then commenced a 2-month public search during which the band received thousands of demo tapes, videos and CDs from all over the world, including Australia and Japan. They chose Detroit native, Steve Mazur, who Coutts and Taggart knew through mutual friends in Los Angeles. After his inception into the band was announced in April, Raine Maida noted: "[It] felt like a cohesive unit...It just felt incredible. It felt like a new band, totally fresh."

During the band's holiday break from recording, Raine received a phone call from Rock on Christmas Eve, asking him if he had anymore song ideas to consider before they returned to the Maui studio in January. The call prompted him to write seven songs over the next ten days. Upon returning to the studio, sections from two of Maida's demos were combined to form the hit song, "Somewhere Out There" at Rock's suggestion. Maida explained "It was like a last minute song done really quickly. I demoed a bunch of songs over Christmas, when we had a break for 10 days. I wrote, like, seven songs and brought them back. Bob listened to all seven songs and then listened to song number three halfway through and song number six halfway through and said, 'OK,' told the engineer to stop the CD, and got us to go put the verse from song three and the chorus from song six together and was like, 'That's the song.'"

For the ten weeks they were in Maui recording (spread over 4 months), the band lived together and would surf and ride mountain bikes in the mornings then work on the album in the evening, usually recording one song in one day and only for a couple of hours before and after dinner. "Leaving Toronto and holing up in a beach house in Maui was a very important step for us," explained Duncan Coutts. "We lived, ate, and breathed music together away from all distractions." The band recorded most of the album at Rock's Plantation Studio in Haiku, Hawaii and finished recording and mixing with Randy Staub at The Warehouse Studio in Vancouver, B.C. in March 2002.

The track "Made of Steel" was recorded three separate times during the sessions with the last take being used. "Do You Like It" was not recorded until after most of the mixing had been completed in Vancouver. According to Raine, "We had gone back to Maui to finish some small details on the last two songs to be mixed and 'lo and behold!' a new song was born and recorded."

The recording technique for this album began a trend of recording songs live in the studio together with minimal overdubs that continued on their later albums. According to the band, doing it live works to create a more realistic set of sounds, "a vibe" reminiscent of Led Zeppelin or early David Bowie, mistakes and all. In earlier albums, they would record each instrument separately and at different times. They began recording "Bring Back the Sun" before the lyrics were even finished. The final version as heard on the album is only the second take of the song, live to tape, with strings overdubbed.

== Music and lyrics ==
Raine stated his intent for the album's sound, "Basically what he [Rock] did with Metallica on the 'black record', we talked and wanted to take that kind of approach. Let him simplify stuff. Let him take away... We always usually try add as many layers as we can to our music, and Bob said, 'Let's try to add not so many.'" The goal was also to make the album's sound more akin to what the band sounded live and to make the songs easier to reproduce on stage. "We'd record a song, sit back and ask, 'Why isn't this sounding like everyone is hearing it in their heads?' Bob would say 'let's simplify the drums,' or 'let's make that bass line simpler.' He was able to pull out why we didn't sound on albums like we do live."

Raine said in an interview that most of the lyrics on Gravity were rewritten because producer Bob Rock felt that the songs would be stronger with simpler lyrics, so that listeners could understand what Raine was talking about. "I was really open to him musically, but I wasn't ready to be challenged lyrically like he challenged me. He kept telling me to rewrite stuff because he didn't understand what I was trying to convey in my lyrics. He would say, 'Raine, I don't have a fucking clue what you're talking about. Convince me. Explain to me what you're trying to say in your lyrics better.' I would keep rewriting and rewriting, and sometimes I felt I would never please him. I would say, 'Jesus, I don't know what you're asking me to do here. I don't think I can do whatever it is you want.' He would say, 'Yes, you can, get back in there.' And I did it. Looking back now, I'm a better writer for it." The stress caused by this challenge eventually led to Raine having to go to a hospital; contracting shingles. Raine had also cited his and his wife Chantal Kreviazuk's recent trips to Iraq with War Child Canada as inspiration to simplify his lyrics and to 'get to the point'. The results were considered some of Raine's most personal lyrics to date while others lamented the loss of Maida's more ambiguous lyrical style.

== Release and reception ==
=== Commercial ===
The album was originally planned to be released on June 11 but was pushed to June 18 because the artwork was not ready in time following the sudden departure of Jamie Edwards, who had become an official member of the band just long enough to take part in the initial photo shoots for the album.

Gravity debuted at #2 on the Canadian Albums Chart, selling close to 25,000 copies in Canada in its first week. The album debuted at #9 in the United States, making it the band's highest position in the United States yet. By October 2002, it had been certified Gold by the RIAA in the U.S. and on November 23 of that year won a CASBY Award for Best New Album. By November 2003, Gravity had been certified double-platinum in Canada (200,000 units).

On November 26, 2002 a deluxe limited-edition version of the album was released as part of the Sound Plus Collector's Series. This version, with a different cover, came with a special bonus DVD of live tracks and the music videos for "Somewhere Out There" and "Innocent" (see below) as well as footage from the Gravity tour. The back cover states that the live tracks were recorded on the Spiritual Machines Tour of 2001. The following text is also included:

The Spiritual Machines tour cemented the connection we have with our fans and inspired us to make Gravity as quickly as we did. The four live songs are a small glimpse of that special tour." - Our Lady Peace

=== Critical ===
Professional ratings
Review scores
| Source | Rating |
|---|---|
| AllMusic | 2/5 stars |
| Bullz-Eye.com | 4/5 stars |
| Edmonton Journal | 3/5 stars |
| Kerrang! | 1/5 stars |
| Kludge | 6/10 |
| Jam! Canoe | neutral |
| Sputnikmusic | 3.5/5 stars |
| Sputnikmusic | 4/5 stars |
| Winnipeg Sun | 3/5 stars |

Despite its success, reviews from critics were mixed to negative. They said the album developed a more extreme "mainstream sound" and was "overproduced" in order to appeal to the American market, this may have been partly due to new producer Bob Rock of Aerosmith and Metallica fame. Some reviewers went as far to call it a "plea for mainstream American acceptance." On the other hand, one publication said the album was noteworthy for its simple, direct approach. A reviewer from Vue Weekly stated that "It sounds like a brand new band, but the jury is out on whether it’s better." Gravity was a big change from their last successful album, Happiness... Is Not a Fish That You Can Catch. Vocalist Raine Maida's signature falsetto is scarce on the album, with his overall tone changing as well or as a reviewer from Kludge put it, "Gravity is almost completely void of Raine Maida’s urgent, almost-squaking, one-of-a-kind vocals and, save three tracks, almost any sense of creativity." Andrew Bonazelli of CMJ New Music Monthly criticized the album's "soul-deadening production" as well as string arrangements for several songs being a "contrived lunge towards accessibility."

In the June 22 issue of Billboard, Larry Flick wrote: "Gravity is a giant leap forward...emerging with a crisp, highly commercial collection of guitar-driven jams." That sentiment was shared by Guitar World's Gary Graff who praised the record in the magazine's August 2002 issue: "...OLP have turned in an album more streamlined and punchy than their previous recordings. Most impressive is the wide assortment of styles here -- a tuneful anthem ('Innocent'), crunchy metal ('All for You') and spacey prog ('Bring Back the Sun') -- with which OLP defy the 'gravity' that personnel changes can have on a band."

=== Impact ===
With the mainstream success of Gravity and "Somewhere Out There", Our Lady Peace's fan base was split between fans of the new material and fans of the old material who, like several critics, cited the band's new direction as sell-out tactic. In 2010, online music magazine Popmatters looked back on the rift saying:

A clear and sudden change from the experimental, art-rock vibe of Spiritual Machines, Gravity not only disappointed a section of Our Lady Peace’s fans, but it drove them away from the group altogether, disappointed and unhappy.

Recently, Gravity`s single "Innocent" received widespread media attention when American Idol winner David Cook performed it on the program. Many, including American Idol judges, criticized both Cook's performance and song choice. Vocalist Raine Maida reportedly contacted Cook and they have since written some songs together.

Two songs from the Gravity sessions were used in World Wrestling Entertainment. The song "Not Enough" was used to make a WWE "Desire" tribute video to Jeff Hardy and Lita. "Whatever", a song not released on the album, was used as WWE wrestler Chris Benoit's entrance theme from 2002 until his death in 2007.

== Singles ==
The lead single for Gravity was "Somewhere Out There", released on April 5, 2002. Four versions of the single were released. In the United States and Canada (SAMPCS11757), a one-track promotional CD was sent to radio stations only. In Australia and Europe, where the single was commercially released respectively on September 9 and 16, 2002 (Columbia 672965 2), three live bonus tracks, "Starseed", "Whatever", and "4 AM" were included. They were recorded in June 2001 in Syracuse, New York during the Spiritual Machines tour. "4 AM" is sung entirely by the audience. The fourth version (Columbia 79943) contains the live version of "Bring Back the Sun". "Somewhere Out There" became one of Our Lady Peace's most successful singles, generating the most chart activity of any of their songs released to radio. The song reached #7 on the U.S. Modern Rock Tracks chart, their highest on that chart since "Clumsy" in 1998. The song also became their second number one in the Canadian Singles Chart peaking at number one and becoming a massive success in Canada.

The second and final single, "Innocent", was released to radio during August 2002. It was commercially released in Europe and Australia with the live tracks "Naveed", "4 AM" and a live cover of John Lennon's "Imagine" as well as the music video for "Innocent". Innocent was also a massive hit in Canada as well peaking at number 2 in the Canadian Singles Chart. The live tracks from this single and "Somewhere out There" were included on the limited edition releases of Gravity. While not as successful as the first single, "Innocent" achieved minor success with its music video. The song received some attention in 2008 when American Idol contestant David Cook, who revealed himself to be a huge OLP fan, sang it on the show. Raine Maida and he have since written together.

The band discussed the release of more singles from the album such as the popular "Not Enough" but single releases after "Innocent" were supplanted by those from the 2003 Live album, which included a live version of "Not Enough".

== Tour ==
Our Lady Peace embarked on one of their biggest tours in support of Gravity a month before the album's release. For most of the tour, Mike Eisenstein of the band Letters to Cleo joined the band as a stunt musician following Jamie Edwards' departure in April due to creative and personal differences. They opened on May 15, 2002 in Dayton, Ohio where many of the songs from Gravity were premiered.

They followed this up with appearances at various music festivals across the United States including Pointfest in St. Louis, Missouri. The tour continued through September 2002 dipping in and out of Canada with the bands Ash, Greenwheel and Audiovent opening for many shows. For most of November the band toured in Europe, their first visit to Europe since 1998. Touring resumed in January 2003 with a Canadian arena tour dubbed "Fear of the Trailer Park". Opening for Our Lady Peace were management-mates Finger Eleven as well as comedy troupe Trailer Park Boys and South African band Seether. The band's arena shows in Calgary and Edmonton would be recorded and released as their first official Live album later that year.

They returned to Europe in March as an opening act for Avril Lavigne. During this leg of the tour two new songs, "Not Afraid" and "Talk is Cheap" were premiered. "Not Afraid" would later be recorded for and rejected from their following studio album, Healthy in Paranoid Times. Following the European tour, the band took off most of June 2003 to begin recording Healthy... and resumed touring throughout America for the rest of the year with 3 Doors Down opening for the majority of the shows. The tour concluded in September 2003.

== Track listing ==
=== Original release ===
All lyrics written by Raine Maida. All music is also composed by Maida except where noted.

| No. | Title | Composer(s) | Length |
|---|---|---|---|
| 1. | "All For You" | Maida, Jeremy Taggart, Duncan Coutts, Jamie Edwards, Mike Turner | 4:14 |
| 2. | "Do You Like It" | | 3:58 |
| 3. | "Somewhere Out There" | | 4:11 |
| 4. | "Innocent" | | 3:42 |
| 5. | "Made of Steel" | | 3:41 |
| 6. | "Not Enough" | | 4:33 |
| 7. | "Sell My Soul" | | 4:20 |
| 8. | "Sorry" | | 3:18 |
| 9. | "Bring Back the Sun" | Maida, Taggart, Coutts, Edwards, Turner | 5:11 |
| 10. | "A Story About a Girl" | Maida, Taggart, Coutts, Edwards, Turner | 4:18 |
| Total length: | | | 41:27 |

=== Limited edition bonus DVD ===
The four live tracks were also released on a promo CD.

1. "Naveed" (live) - 6:47
2. "Whatever" (live) - 4:02
3. "Starseed" (live) - 7:38
4. "4 AM" (live) - 5:01
5. "Somewhere Out There" (music video)
6. "Innocent" (music video)
7. "On the Road" (live video clip, directed by Micha Dahan)

== Studio outtakes ==
According to Jeremy Taggart, twelve songs were completed (including mixing) for the album but two ("Angelina's Song" and "Stop Screaming") were cut off at the last minute. Duncan Coutts stated in an interview that six songs written by the band including Mike Turner and Jamie Edwards were recorded while only three ("All For You", "Bring Back the Sun" and "A Story About a Girl") made the final cut for the album.

In the midst of touring in October 2002, Our Lady Peace briefly returned to Bob Rock's studio in Maui to finish two songs left off of Gravity for an upcoming soundtrack. Maida mentioned on the band's website that they are both riff based songs that probably sound closer to "Whatever" than anything else. One of these songs was "Our Time Is Fading" a.k.a. "The End Always Comes Last", which was one of the last songs written with Mike Turner. The song never made the soundtrack and a studio version was never released but the song was played live multiple times and a live version was released on the Live album in 2003.

== Personnel ==
As listed in liner notes.

Musicians

- Duncan Coutts - bass guitar
- Jamie Edwards - keyboards, guitars, string arrangements
- Raine Maida - vocals
- Steve Mazur - guitars
- Jeremy Taggart - drums
- Mike Turner - rhythm guitar on "All For You", "Innocent", "Sorry", "Bring Back the Sun", & "A Story About a Girl"

Additional string arrangements by Bob Buckley

Production

- Zach Blackstone - assistant mixer
- Mike Gillies - digital engineering and editing
- Eric Helmkamp - 2nd engineer
- George Marino - master
- Bob Rock - producer
- Randy Staub - mixer

== Charts ==
=== Weekly charts ===
Weekly chart performance for Gravity
| Chart (2002) | Peak position |
|---|---|
| New Zealand Albums (RMNZ) | 24 |
| Canadian Albums (Billboard) | 2 |
| US Billboard 200 | 9 |

=== Year-end charts ===
Year-end chart performance for Gravity
| Chart (2002) | Position |
|---|---|
| Canadian Albums (Nielsen SoundScan) | 23 |
| Canadian Alternative Albums (Nielsen SoundScan) | 4 |
| Canadian Metal Albums (Nielsen SoundScan) | 2 |
| US Billboard 200 | 171 |

== Certifications ==
Certifications for Gravity
| Region | Certification | Certified units/sales |
|---|---|---|
| Canada (Music Canada) | 2× Platinum | 200,000^{^} |
| United States (RIAA) | Gold | 500,000^{^} |
^{^} Shipments figures based on certification alone.

== Release history ==
Release dates and formats for Gravity
| Region | Date | Label | Format | Catalog |
|---|---|---|---|---|
| United States | June 18, 2002 | Columbia | CD | CK 86585 |
| Canada | June 18, 2002 | Columbia | CD | - |
| Canada | November 26, 2002 | Columbia | CD + DVD | CK 80823 |
| Asia | July 31, 2002 | Sony | CD | SICP 195 |
| United Kingdom | September 30, 2002 | Epic | CD | 5087802 |
| Australia | October 7, 2002 | Epic | CD | - |
| France | October 14, 2002 | Epic | CD | - |
| Europe | October 14, 2002 | Epic | CD | - |
| Southeast Asia | 2002 | Columbia | CS | CT 86585 |
| Canada | October 4, 2017 | Columbia | LP | 88985459881 |
