= Live (Our Lady Peace album) =

Live album by Our Lady Peace
- Released: June 24, 2003; July 1, 2003 (France); November 11, 2003 (DVD)
- Recorded: January 27, 2003 in Pengrowth Saddledome, Calgary, AB, Canada January 28, 2003 in Skyreach Centre, Edmonton, AB, Canada February 5, 2003 in Bell Centre, Montreal, PQ, Canada
- Genres: Alternative rock, post-grunge
- Length: 77:40
- Label: Columbia

Our Lady Peace chronology
Gravity (2002)	Live (2003)	Healthy in Paranoid Times (2005)

Singles from Live
- 1. "Starseed"; 2. "Not Enough"; 3. "Superman's Dead"

Professional ratings
Review scores
Source	Rating
Allmusic	3/5 stars

Live is Canadian alternative rock band Our Lady Peace's first live album. It was recorded during their cross-Canadian "Fear of the Trailer Park" tour in support of their fifth studio album, Gravity. The dates recorded for this album included January 27, 2003 in Calgary, Alberta, Canada; January 28, 2003 in Edmonton, Alberta, Canada, and February 5, 2003 in Montreal, Quebec, Canada. It was released on June 24, 2003 by Columbia Records. A DVD of the performances was released on November 11, 2003.

The first track segues in from the faint sounds of a hidden track from Spiritual Machines.

== Commercial performance ==
Live debuted at #5 on the Canadian Albums Chart, selling 8,000 copies in its first week.

== Track listing ==
=== CD ===
1. "All for You" – 5:06
2. "Superman's Dead" – 5:52
3. "Not Enough" – 4:32
4. "Naveed/Life" – 10:41
5. "Innocent" – 4:59
6. "Bring Back the Sun" – 5:07
7. "One Man Army" – 4:06
8. "Is Anybody Home?" – 5:52
9. "Our Time Is Fading" – 3:03
10. "Are You Sad?" – 8:24
11. "Whatever" – 3:33
12. "Clumsy" – 4:19
13. "Starseed" – 7:59
14. "Somewhere Out There" – 4:23

=== DVD ===
1. "Intro"
2. "All for You"
3. "Do You Like It"
4. "Superman's Dead"
5. "Naveed/Life"
6. "Not Enough"
7. "Bring Back the Sun"
8. "Innocent"
9. "One Man Army"
10. "Whatever"
11. "Right Behind You (Mafia)"
12. "Is Anybody Home?"
13. "Are You Sad?"
14. "Our Time Is Fading"
15. "The Birdman"
16. "Clumsy"
17. "Starseed"
18. "In Repair"
19. "Drive" (The Cars cover)
20. "Somewhere Out There"
21. "4 A.M."
