= Somewhere Out There (Our Lady Peace song) =

2002 single by Our Lady Peace

Single by Our Lady Peace

from the album Gravity
- Released: April 1, 2002
- Studio: Plantation (Maui, Hawaii)
- Genre: Post-grunge
- Length: 4:11
- Label: Columbia
- Songwriter: Raine Maida
- Producer: Bob Rock

Our Lady Peace singles chronology
"Right Behind You (Mafia)" (2001)	"Somewhere Out There" (2002)	"Innocent" (2002)

Music video
- "Somewhere Out There" on YouTube

"Somewhere Out There" is a song by Canadian alternative rock group Our Lady Peace. It was released on April 1, 2002, as the lead single from their fifth studio album, Gravity. "Somewhere Out There" reached number 44 on the US Billboard Hot 100 chart (becoming the band's highest-charting single in the US) and peaked inside the top 40 on five other Billboard charts. "Somewhere Out There" was the ninth-most-played song on radio in Canada in 2002.

== Song information ==
The correct title of the song is indeed "Somewhere Out There", however the specific chorus lyrics "defying gravity" and the fact that the album is titled Gravity, led some to believe that the title of the song was "Gravity". The song is mislabeled as such in some search engines, lyric websites, and P2P file-sharing programs.

The song is one of Our Lady Peace's most successful singles to date, having been very popular both in Canada and the United States. Many critics praised the single, but some also criticized it for being "too mainstream", saying that the artistic uniqueness that Our Lady Peace possessed in former albums was absent here.

In Our Lady Peace's 2006 compilation album, A Decade, which includes many of Our Lady Peace's greatest hits, "Somewhere Out There" is featured. The song also plays during the end credits of the 2005 film White Noise and the 2002 season 2 episode "Redux" of Smallville.

== Singles ==
Four versions of the single were released. In the United States and Canada, a one-track promotional CD was sent to radio stations only. In Australia, where the single was commercially released on September 16, 2002, three live bonus tracks—"Starseed", "Whatever", and "4 AM"—were included. They were recorded in June 2001 in Syracuse, New York during the Spiritual Machines tour. "4 AM" is sung entirely by the audience. The single was released in Europe on September 16, 2002, with "Whatever" omitted. The fourth version, released in 2003 as part of the promotion for Live, contains the live version of "Bring Back the Sun" from that album.

== Music video ==
The music video was directed by Eric Heimbold. It was filmed in Montreal around April. It shows the band performing for fans on a rounded stage lit up in a very dark studio. Most of the video focuses on a woman, played by actress Sarah Sanguin Carter, who climbs to the top of a speaker tower and then throws herself off, being caught by the crowd. The video was officially released on May 22, 2002. This is also Steve Mazur's first appearance in the band since former lead guitarist Mike Turner left to form Fair Ground.

== Charts ==
=== Weekly charts ===
Weekly chart performance for "Somewhere Out There"
Chart (2002)	Peak position
Canada (Nielsen BDS)	4
Canada CHR (Nielsen BDS)	6
US Billboard Hot 100	44
US Adult Pop Airplay (Billboard)	12
US Alternative Airplay (Billboard)	7
US Mainstream Rock (Billboard)	26
US Pop Airplay (Billboard)	19
US Top 40 Tracks (Billboard)	23

=== Year-end charts ===
Year-end chart performance for "Somewhere Out There"
Chart (2002)	Position
Canada Radio (Nielsen BDS)	9
US Adult Top 40 (Billboard)	31
US Mainstream Top 40 (Billboard)	65
US Modern Rock Tracks (Billboard)	34

== Release history ==
Release dates and formats for "Somewhere Out There"
Region	Date	Format(s)	Label(s)	Ref.
United States	April 1, 2002	Mainstream rock; active rock; alternative radio	Columbia	
United States	June 3, 2002	Contemporary hit radio	Columbia	
Australia	September 16, 2002	CD	Columbia	
Denmark	September 30, 2002	CD	Epic	
