= Raine Maida =

Canadian musician

Raine Maida CM
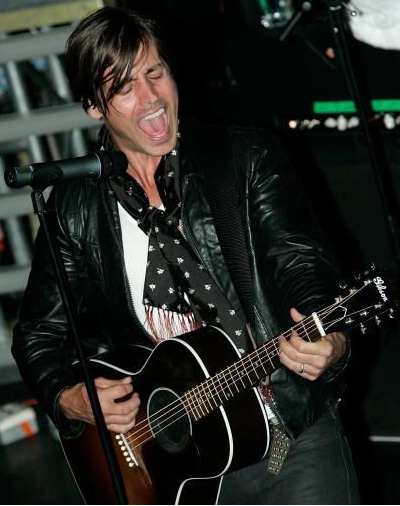
- Maida performing with Our Lady Peace in 2010

Background information
- Born: Michael Anthony Maida; February 18, 1970 (age 56); Weston, Ontario, Canada
- Origin: Toronto, Ontario, Canada
- Genres: Post-grunge, alternative rock, spoken word, folk
- Occupations: Musician, singer, songwriter
- Instruments: Vocals, guitar
- Years active: 1992–present
- Labels: Kingnoise, Columbia, Sony BMG
- Member of: Our Lady Peace
- Spouse: Chantal Kreviazuk (m. 1999)
- Website: www.rainemaida.net/ www.raineandchantal.com www.rainemaida.wixsite.com/

Raine Maida CM (/ˈreɪn ˈmeɪdə/ RAYN MAY-də; born Michael Anthony Maida; February 18, 1970) is a Canadian musician best known as being the lead vocalist and primary songwriter of the alternative rock band Our Lady Peace. He has come to be known for his unique countertenor nasal falsetto singing voice, as well as his cryptic and poetry-influenced song lyrics. Following guitarist Mike Turner's departure from Our Lady Peace in 2001, Maida is the only remaining original member of the band.

Maida began a solo career in 2006 by releasing his first solo album, The Hunters Lullaby in 2007. He also self-produced Our Lady Peace's seventh studio album, Burn Burn, in 2009. Maida has been married to Canadian singer Chantal Kreviazuk since 1999, and together they have three sons. Maida has been intimately involved with War Child and other charities since 2003, and was an outspoken critic of the Iraq War and former U.S. president George W. Bush.

== Early life ==
Michael Anthony Maida was born in Weston, Ontario, in 1970. His parents split up when he was very young. Before pursuing a musical career, Maida studied criminology at the University of Toronto, and prior to that attended Ridley College in St. Catharines although he did not graduate. Around late 1991, Maida changed his given name from "Michael" to "Raine".

== Career ==
=== Our Lady Peace ===
Raine Maida is the vocalist and a founding member of the Canadian rock band Our Lady Peace. Maida started the band with guitarist Mike Turner in 1992. Especially on the albums prior to Gravity, he often sang in a high, nasal voice. This singing style, along with Maida's cryptic lyrics, became one of the features of Our Lady Peace's music. After working with producer Bob Rock on the album Gravity, his voice became less nasal, and his tone became slightly deeper. His lyrics were also less Delphic, although these attributes have been abandoned and his older singing style and lyrical work has returned to a certain degree on the band's 2012 album, Curve. Maida has released seven albums with Our Lady Peace, plus a live album and two greatest hits collections, namely A Decade and The Very Best of Our Lady Peace.

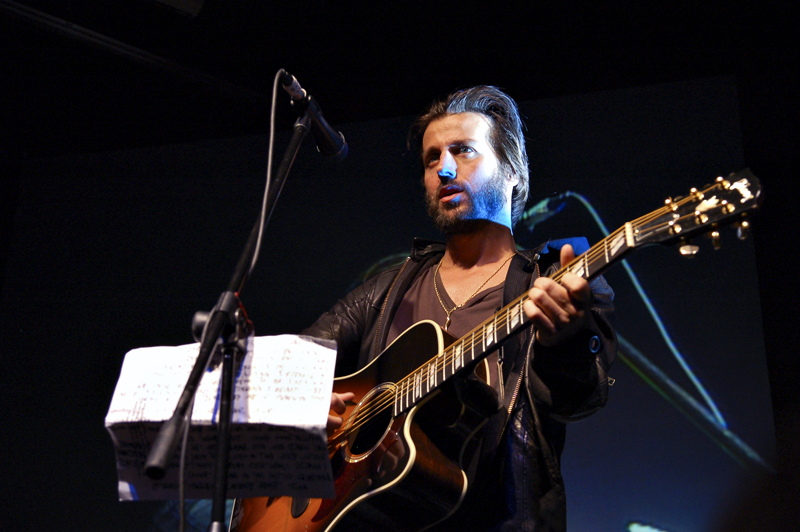
Maida performing solo in 2007

=== Solo work ===
Maida released a four song EP called Love Hope Hero on November 14, 2006. The EP contains the songs "One Second Chance", "Earthless", "Sex Love and Honey", and "Careful What You Wish For". The EP was sold on tours with Chantal Kreviazuk, on his website, and on iTunes.

His full-length solo album, The Hunters Lullaby, was released on November 13, 2007, by independent label Kingnoise Records. The album was recorded in Maida's own studio using mostly acoustic instruments, and is described by Maida as "a collection of poems put to music". Kreviazuk is featured on several tracks, singing and playing piano.

Before releasing his second solo album, it was stated that songs from the album would be released starting August 24, 2010, with the song "Bury Me with a Gun", and from then on a new song would be released every few weeks until the release of the completed album in early 2011. Maida's website was then updated with the possible album title of Pachamama with a release date of February 20, 2012. However, a few days after this date had passed, the date was replaced with "Coming Soon".

On June 22, 2012, Maida announced the release of the free EP Pachamama available for download on Maida's official website, featuring three new tracks and cover artwork.

On February 8, 2013, CBC Music debuted the official lyric video for the album's official first single "Montreal". On May 14, 2013, We All Get Lighter was released. The album did not include the originally intended single, "Bury Me with a Gun".

=== Producing and writing ===
Maida has also been producing music since 1999, when he co-produced Our Lady Peace's albums Happiness...Is Not a Fish That You Can Catch and Spiritual Machines. He has developed numerous indie bands, including Texas-based Sleepway, Lightbreak and Billy the Kid.

He produced four songs on the dance punk band Men, Women & Children's self-titled debut for Warner Bros. Records. He co-wrote and produced five tracks on Avril Lavigne's second album, Under My Skin, which was released in 2004.

Maida and Chantal Kreviazuk contributed to Kelly Clarkson's song "Where Is Your Heart?"; Kreviazuk co-wrote it, while Maida produced and played the guitar. Maida and Kreviazuk also helped write the international hit "Walk Away", another song on Clarkson's album, Breakaway. They also co-wrote "One Minute" for Clarkson's third album, My December.

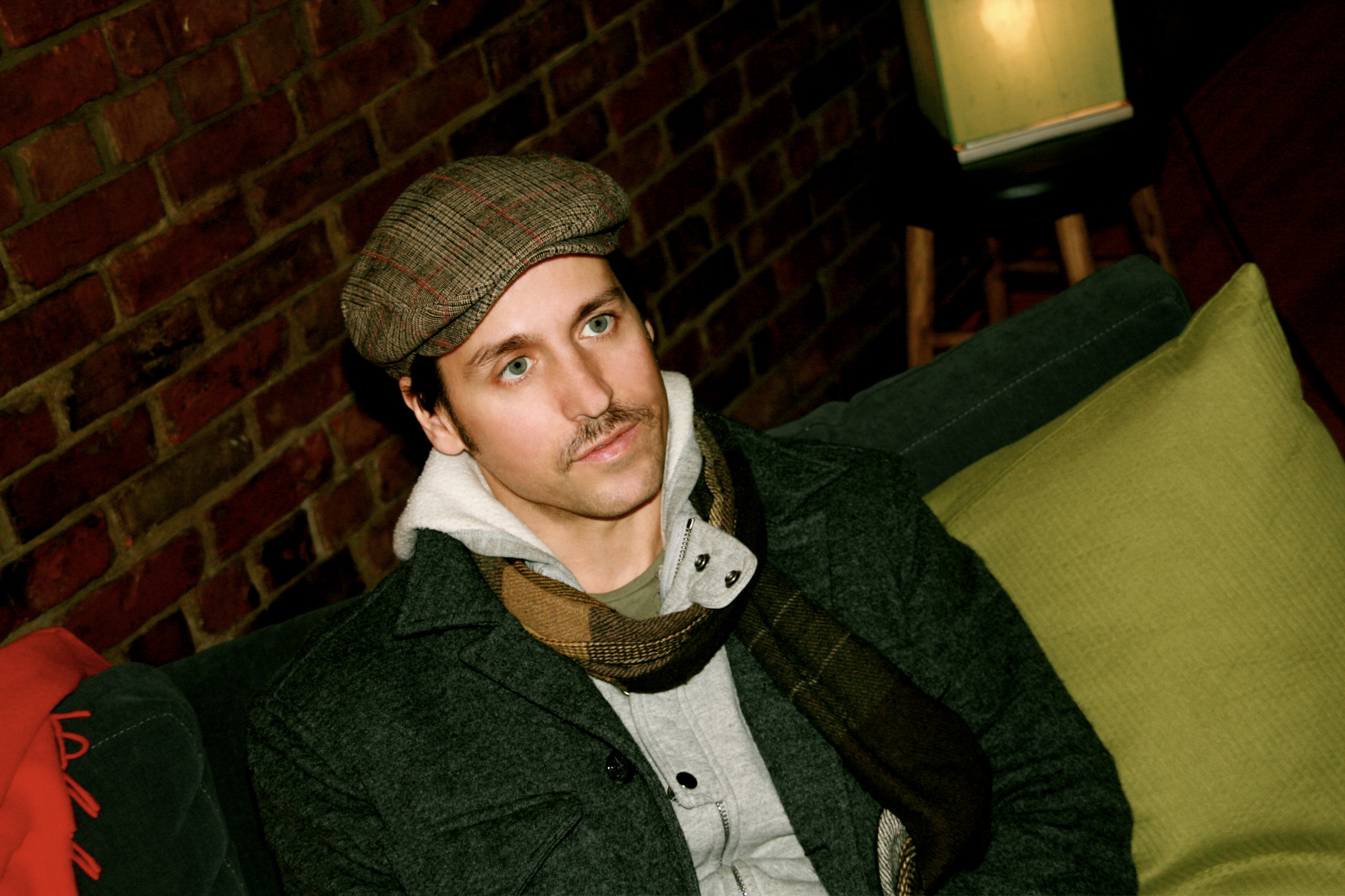
Maida during a 2008 interview

Maida and Kreviazuk contributed to The Veronicas' first album The Secret Life Of...; they wrote and produced the song "Revolution". Maida and Kreviazuk also co-wrote "Outside of You" with Pink but the song ended up on Hilary Duff's 2007 release, Dignity. The two wrote and produced both the first single and theme for Cheyenne Kimball's MTV reality show and album The Day Has Come. They wrote "Meant to Fly" for Eva Avila, the winner of the fourth season of Canadian Idol, and wrote the first single of Rex Goudie's second album Look Closer, called "You Got to Me".

Most recently, they co-wrote the song "Permanent" with American Idol winner David Cook. Maida also collaborated with Cook on the songs "Heroes", "Mr. Sensitive", and "I Did It for You", on the self-titled album, David Cook. Maida has also been co-writing with the pop punk band Hawk Nelson for the 2008 released album Hawk Nelson Is My Friend. Maida has co-writes on numerous releases including Alternative rock bands Uncle Kracker, Green River Ordinance, Marianas Trench and Toronto-based Die Mannequin. Maida also co-wrote a song, "Unapologize" for Carrie Underwood's 2009 album Play On.

=== LOOP/POOL ===
Maida is a cofounder and director at LOOP/POOL, a Canadian artist-focused and social-forward cannabis brand. LOOP/POOL has committed a minimum of five percent of proceeds towards POOL/FUND, a philanthropic organization to support independent Canadian artists who have been underserved or unable to access funding from existing grant programs, and further struggling during the pandemic.

=== S!NG ===
Maida signed on with the S!NG team as their Chief Product Officer, a developer of tools that allow creators to control distribution and monetize their work. It launched in March 2021 and was designed to instantly mint NFTs to sell or license online. “S!NG is the safest and easiest platform for creators to mint NFTs,” says Maida. “There is no better time to be an artist than right now, because we are on the precipice of an artistic revolution where control belongs to the artist. This is an industry game changer.”

Maida said in an interview the app will help artists protect their work and connect with fans in a more efficient way. “The ability to sell directly to your fans and monetize that in ways that we never really thought of before, it’s a tectonic shift that’s happening,” he said, explaining that artists who make their work available as an NFT are in charge of the ownership of that content. “When you see artists who don’t have a huge following selling completed works [and] when there isn’t that middle-man, fans will engage and participate,” Maida said. “It goes back to the day of when we were starting out playing in clubs and you’d put out a signup sheet at the merch table to get emails from fans, why did we want that? Because I wanted to talk to them directly. And socials, Twitter, Instagram, I think it helped for a minute, but it does dilute that relationship.”

=== Other work ===
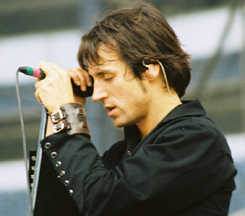
Maida in 1999 performing with Our Lady Peace

Maida had a small role in a Canadian movie released in 2001, Century Hotel. He played the character Damon Riley. In 2005, Maida contributed Liar to Act 1: Goodbye Friends of the Heavenly Bodies from Neverending White Lights. Maida received special thanks on People in Planes album Beyond The Horizon. Maida and Kreviazuk wrote an original song for the HBO documentary Ithuteng, and composed music for the restored version of Helen Gardner's 1912 silent film version of Cleopatra.

Both Maida and Kreviazuk are strong advocates of the organization War Child, having traveled and filmed documentaries in Iraq, Darfur, and Ethiopia. Maida produced a War Child Canada benefit album entitled Help!: A Day in the Life. His efforts have led to a number of distinctions, including the Tiffany Mark Award, WarChild's "Philanthropist of the Year", the Allan Slaight Humanitarian Award and the prestigious Alan Waters Humanitarian Award from the Juno Awards. Maida and Kreviazuk both also co-hosted a 2006 Mothers Against Drunk Driving video. Maida is also known for his advocacy work with The David Suzuki Foundation, The Hospital for Sick Children and Apathy Is Boring. He recently founded Harmony House, a music therapy retreat for war veterans. Raine has also expressed support for the Green Party of Canada.

In December 2014 Maida was appointed a member of the Order of Canada along with Kreviazuk by Governor General David Johnston for their charitable and humanitarian work.

== Personal life ==
Maida met Canadian singer-songwriter Chantal Kreviazuk at a Pearl Jam concert in Toronto in 1996. They married in December 1999 in Toronto, and have three sons together. In honour of their tenth wedding anniversary, Maida and Kreviazuk renewed their wedding vows in Costa Rica in November 2009. From 2016 to 2017, the couple went on tour for their new side project titled Moon Vs. Sun.

Kreviazuk and Maida appeared in the 2019 documentary film I'm Going to Break Your Heart, which detailed both their collaboration on the album Moon vs. Sun and the conflicts and tensions that had arisen in their marriage after 19 years.

== Discography ==
=== Solo ===
- 2006: Love Hope Hero EP (all four tracks are included in The Hunters Lullaby)
- 2007: The Hunters Lullaby (includes all 4 tracks from Love Hope Hero)
- 2010: "Bury Me with a Gun" (Single)
- 2012: Pachamama EP I
- 2012: Pachamama EP II
- 2013: We All Get Lighter

=== Our Lady Peace ===
- 1994: Naveed
- 1997: Clumsy
- 1999: Happiness... Is Not a Fish That You Can Catch
- 2000: Spiritual Machines
- 2002: Gravity
- 2003: Live
- 2005: Healthy in Paranoid Times
- 2006: A Decade
- 2009: The Very Best of Our Lady Peace
- 2009: Burn Burn
- 2012: Curve
- 2018: Somethingness
- 2021: Spiritual Machines II

== Singles ==
- "Lebo's River" (with Chantal Kreviazuk, Lebo Kgasapane, and Archie Khambula) from Help!: A Day in the Life
- "Yellow Brick Road" premiere single from The Hunters Lullaby
- "Montreal" the first single from his second solo album We All Get Lighter

Preceded by Bob Rock	Our Lady Peace producer 2007–present	Succeeded by Incumbent
