= Haʻikū-Pauwela, Hawaii =

Haʻikū-Pauwela
- Census-designated place
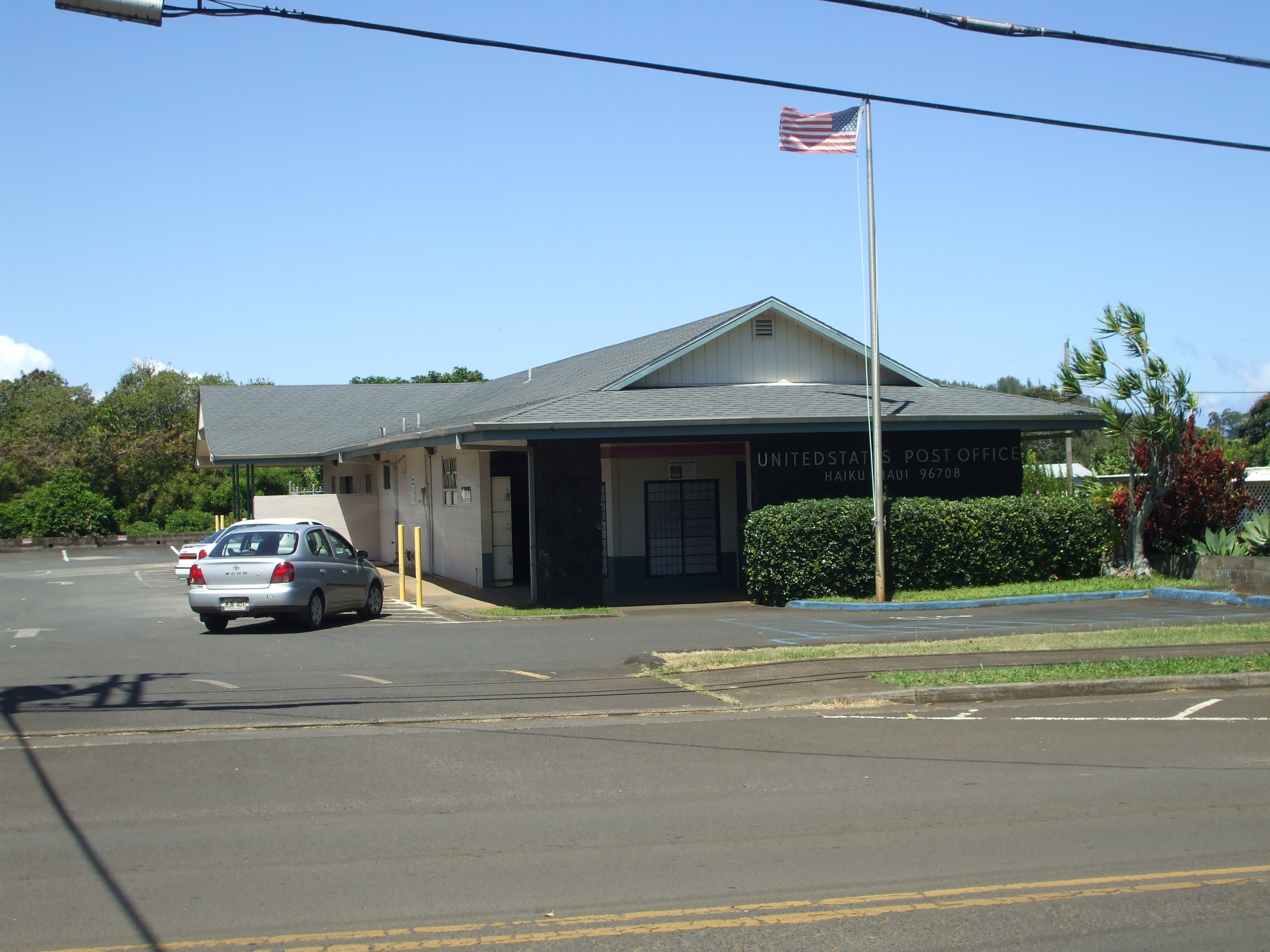
- Haiku Post Office

- Location in Maui County and the state of Hawaii
- Coordinates: 20°55′14″N 156°18′45″W
- Country: United States
- State: Hawaii
- County: Maui

Area
  - Total: 19.17 sq mi (49.64 km^{2})
  - Land: 15.78 sq mi (40.87 km^{2})
  - Water: 3.39 sq mi (8.77 km^{2})

Population (2020)
  - Total: 8,595
  - Density: 544.7/sq mi (210.31/km^{2})
- Time zone: UTC-10 (Hawaii-Aleutian)
- Area code: 808
- FIPS code: 15-09260

Haʻikū-Pauwela is a census-designated place (CDP) in Maui County, Hawaii, United States, consisting of the village of Haʻikū and the hamlet of Pauwela. Haiku itself is an unincorporated community. The population was 8,595 at the 2020 census.

== Geography ==
Haiku-Pauwela is located at 20°55′14″N 156°18′45″W (20.920528, -156.312631).

According to the United States Census Bureau, the CDP has a total area of 19.2 square miles (49.6 km^{2}), of which 15.8 square miles (40.9 km^{2}) is land and 3.4 square miles (8.8 km^{2}), or 17.67%, is water.

== Demographics ==
Historical population
| Census | Pop. | Note | %± |
|---|---|---|---|
| 1990 | 4,509 | | — |
| 2000 | 6,578 | | 45.9% |
| 2010 | 8,118 | | 23.4% |
| 2020 | 8,595 | | 5.9% |

At the 2000 census there were 6,578 people, 2,310 households, and 1,524 families in the CDP. The population density was 417.5 inhabitants per square mile (161.2/km^{2}). There were 2,454 housing units at an average density of 155.8 units per square mile (60.2 units/km^{2}). The racial makeup of the CDP was 56.20% White, 0.52% African American, 0.53% Native American, 10.14% Asian, 7.01% Pacific Islander, 0.97% from other races, and 24.63% from two or more races. Hispanic or Latino of any race were 8.27%.

Of the 2,310 households 35.9% had children under the age of 18 living with them, 48.0% were married couples living together, 11.2% had a female householder with no husband present, and 34.0% were non-families. 21.1% of households were one person and 4.2% were one person aged 65 or older. The average household size was 2.83 and the average family size was 3.29.

The age distribution was 26.0% under the age of 18, 7.4% from 18 to 24, 34.3% from 25 to 44, 25.4% from 45 to 64, and 6.8% 65 or older. The median age was 36 years. For every 100 females, there were 104.5 males. For every 100 females age 18 and over, there were 104.1 males.

The median household income was $45,397 and the median family income was $52,350. Males had a median income of $35,737 versus $29,610 for females. The per capita income for the CDP was $21,702. About 8.1% of families and 16.4% of the population were below the poverty line, including 16.5% of those under age 18 and 8.0% of those age 65 or over.

== Climate ==
Haiku-Pauwela has a tropical rainforest climate (Köppen: Af).

Climate data for Haiku-Pauwela
| Month | Jan | Feb | Mar | Apr | May | Jun | Jul | Aug | Sep | Oct | Nov | Dec | Year |
|---|---|---|---|---|---|---|---|---|---|---|---|---|---|
| Mean daily maximum °C (°F) | 23.1 (73.6) | 22.6 (72.7) | 22.7 (72.9) | 23.1 (73.6) | 23.9 (75.0) | 24.6 (76.3) | 25.1 (77.2) | 25.4 (77.7) | 25.5 (77.9) | 25.3 (77.5) | 24.5 (76.1) | 23.6 (74.5) | 24.1 (75.4) |
| Daily mean °C (°F) | 22.1 (71.8) | 21.6 (70.9) | 21.8 (71.2) | 22.2 (72.0) | 23.0 (73.4) | 23.7 (74.7) | 24.1 (75.4) | 24.5 (76.1) | 24.6 (76.3) | 24.3 (75.7) | 23.5 (74.3) | 22.7 (72.9) | 23.2 (73.7) |
| Mean daily minimum °C (°F) | 21.1 (70.0) | 20.7 (69.3) | 20.8 (69.4) | 21.3 (70.3) | 22.1 (71.8) | 22.8 (73.0) | 23.2 (73.8) | 23.6 (74.5) | 23.6 (74.5) | 23.5 (74.3) | 22.7 (72.9) | 21.8 (71.2) | 22.3 (72.1) |
| Average precipitation mm (inches) | 57.1 (2.25) | 63.0 (2.48) | 78.3 (3.08) | 66.7 (2.63) | 50.2 (1.98) | 43.0 (1.69) | 58.6 (2.31) | 54.8 (2.16) | 53.5 (2.11) | 57.4 (2.26) | 69.1 (2.72) | 77.6 (3.06) | 729.3 (28.73) |
Source: Weather.Directory

== Notable people ==
- Zach Scott - former professional footballer for Seattle Sounders FC, born in Haiku-Pauwela

== See also ==
- List of census-designated places in Hawaii
