= Pedestrian (band) =

American rock band

- Pedestrian, 2006. L-R: Zac Rae, Blair Sinta, Joe Karnes, and Joel Shearer.

Background information
- Origin: Los Angeles, California, United States
- Genres: Alternative rock
- Years active: 2002–present
- Label: Headwreckords
- Members: Joel Shearer; Zac Rae; Joseph Karnes; Blair Sinta
- Past members: Kane McGee; Ed Maxwell; Brendan Buckley; Stewart Cole; Cedric Lemoyne
- Website: pedestrianmusic.org

Pedestrian is an alternative rock band based in Los Angeles, California, United States. The band was formed in late 2002 by guitarist/songwriter Joel Shearer.

Band members have played in the backing bands of artists such as Gnarls Barkley, Damien Rice, Alanis Morissette, Dido and Our Lady Peace, as well as for Death Cab For Cutie. Pedestrian was also invited to perform as opening acts on tour in North America and overseas with Damien Rice and Our Lady Peace, allowing the band to reach a wider audience and larger fanbase.

Although releasing albums on Shearer's own independent label, the band has a distribution deal with Iris Records.

== Members ==
- Joel Shearer (vocals, guitar)
- Joseph Karnes (bass, vocals)
- Zac Rae (keyboards, guitar, bass)
- Blair Sinta (drums, vocals)

Former or part-time members:

- Brendan Buckley (drums, keyboards, vocals)
- Stewart Cole (trumpet, effects, vibe)
- Cedric Lemoyne (bass)
- Ed Maxwell (bass, keyboards, vocals)
- Kane McGee (drums)

== Discography ==
Pedestrian independently released 4 CDs: the Electric and Acoustic EP's (2003), Ghostly Life (2006) and Sidegeist (2008)

=== Ghostly Life ===
The band took a long time to make their first full-length album, Ghostly Life, because members were on tour with Damien Rice in 2003, Our Lady Peace in 2005, and also took time out to record and tour with other artists. The album "Ghostly Life" is inspired by "art, politics, love, hate, life, loneliness, chaos, and good Scotch".

=== Sidegeist ===
Pedestrian recorded Sidegeist independently at the band's studio in Los Angeles. It features Randy Kerber (piano on "Let the Ending Begin") and Shara Worden (vocals on "Shape of a Pocket") of My Brightest Diamond. The album "Sidegeist" is inspired by "art, politics, love, life, loneliness, chaos, good scotch and a beautiful dog named Cedrick". Following the release of Sidegeist, the band was named The Deli LA's Band of the Month for 1st half of September 2008.

=== Discography ===
Date of Release	Title	Track listing
(date unknown)	Live	(track list unknown)
2003	Acoustic	1. Oxygen; 2. Red Tape; 3. Folly of Leaders; 4. Overwhlemed; 5. A 6. Sick Love; 7. B 8. Eventually
2003	Electric	1. Overwhelmed; 2. A 3. Red Tape; 4. Temporary; 5. Finally all the Noise; 6. B 7. Plucked; 8. C 9. Dosify
May 3, 2006	Ghostly Life	1. Headwreck; 2. Hummingbird on a Wire; 3. Overwhelmed; 4. Come Down After; 5. Playing God; 6. Pleased; 7. The Abundance Of; 8. This Pretty Girl; 9. Brian on a Stick; 10. Dosify; 11. Ghostly Life
2008	Sidegeist	1. Covered in Grey; 2. Blow Against the Wind; 3. Silent Faces; 4. Shape of a Pocket; 5. Your Radio; 6. Go; 7. Song for a Lady; 8. The Heights; 9. Storm; 10. Let the Ending Begin
