= The Birdman (song) =

Single by Our Lady Peace

from the album Naveed
- Released: January 17, 1994
- Length: 5:12 (album version)
- Label: Sony Music, Epic, Relativity (US)
- Songwriter(s): Raine Maida
- Producer(s): Arnold Lanni

Our Lady Peace singles chronology
"The Birdman" (1994)	"Starseed" (1994)

Audio sample
- "The Birdman": file; help

"The Birdman" is Our Lady Peace's debut single, and the lead single of their debut album Naveed. Because of the Naveed cover, Saul Fox is best known for being the Birdman. The chorus of the song originates from an early demo that the band cut in 1992 called "Nobody's Wrong" with a completely different meaning.

== Release ==
"The Birdman" is the first single released by Our Lady Peace, only in Canada, on January 17, 1994. It was considered to be the least accessible track off Naveed and was chosen to be the first single for that reason. According to Catherine McRae, manager of domestic marketing and artist development for Sony Music Canada, "We deliberately chose a single which wasn't an immediate, commercial, hit-radio single and then serviced it specifically first to campus radio to build a street buzz on the band."

Raine Maida admitted that he knew "The Birdman" wouldn't do well at radio. He said in an interview with Billboard in 1995, "What it did was allow us three months to tour with other bands and get better. Now we're all confident about our live show. We're not intimidated by playing with anybody."

== Meaning ==
The song is about a man that lead singer and lyricist Raine Maida once saw on the street. The Birdman was the nickname of convicted killer, Robert Stroud who was imprisoned at Alcatraz Federal Penitentiary for 17 years.

"I assumed he was some kind of politician that lost it and was living on the streets and just going nuts all night. It was strange; I just caught a few words as I passed by him, and he was one of the most intelligent people I have ever heard speak. Right then I had this enlightenment. I did not give him a chance and there are probably times where you miss opportunities because you form opinions so quickly." - Raine Maida

"I was in Kansas city a while back and there was this man on the street. I was in my hotel room and I couldn't sleep ‘cause this guy was just yelling through a megaphone and he was yelling about a bunch of propaganda and stuff but the next day when I went down from the hotel and he was outside still. I had a chance to pass by, read his booklet and stuff and I heard him talking to some other people and the song encompasses the thing where it's kinda like a serial killer where on the surface he's just a ruthless, kinda no conscience, no remorse killer but underneath the serial killer there's obviously a really intelligent, very calculating kind of person and that is what I wanted to get in the lyrics of the song. There's so many different ways and so many different perspectives to look at somebody.This thing, the birdman is just that in itself, that there's always something deeper when you look into it." -Raine Maida

== Music video ==
The band chose Floria Sigismondi to direct "The Birdman" video after, according to Maida, the first unidentified director they chose pitched an idea that was completely irrelevant to the song. Maida later witnessed the same idea used for another artist's video by that director.

Sigismondi's video is set against a sunset backdrop and stars Saul Fox as the bird man as well as the members of the band. Saul appears at various times in the video parading around a nest wearing a birdcage on his head, wearing a fake beak and wearing wings as well as having corresponding scars on his back while the band plays on. The video ends with Raine Maida going insane and kicking around the bird nest before the video fades out. The video version of the song is edited so that it fades out before the actual ending.

== Track listing ==
Epic 924

1. Album Version - 5:12
2. Edit Version - 4:13
