= The Hunters Lullaby =

Studio album by Raine Maida
- Released: November 13, 2007
- Genre: Folk, alternative rock, spoken word, rap
- Length: 34:30
- Label: Kingnoise Records

Singles from The Hunters Lullaby
- 1. "Yellow Brick Road" Released: November 14, 2007

Professional ratings
Review scores
| Source | Rating |
|---|---|
| AllMusic | link |
| Plug In Music | link |
| Popjournalism | link |
| Sputnik Music | link |

The Hunters Lullaby is the first solo album released by Canadian musician Raine Maida, the vocalist for Our Lady Peace. It was released on November 13, 2007, by Kingnoise Records. The first single off the album is "Yellow Brick Road". Previous solo work by Maida includes a four-song EP entitled Love Hope Hero, which was released on November 14.

== Track listing ==
1. Careful What You Wish For – 4:40 (composed by Chantal Kreviazuk)
2. Sex Love and Honey – 4:03
3. Yellow Brick Road – 3:07
4. The Less I Know (feat. Jared Paul) – 3:40
5. Earthless – 3:00
6. The Snake and the Crown – 2:41 (composed by – Jared Paul)
7. Confessional – 3:06
8. China Doll – 3:31
9. Rat Race – 3:41
10. One Second Chance – 3:01

=== Bonus tracks ===
1. Victim of a Small Town (iTunes pre-order) – 3:01
2. 21st Century Blues (iTunes pre-order) – 3:35
