= Jason Pierce (drummer) =

Canadian drummer

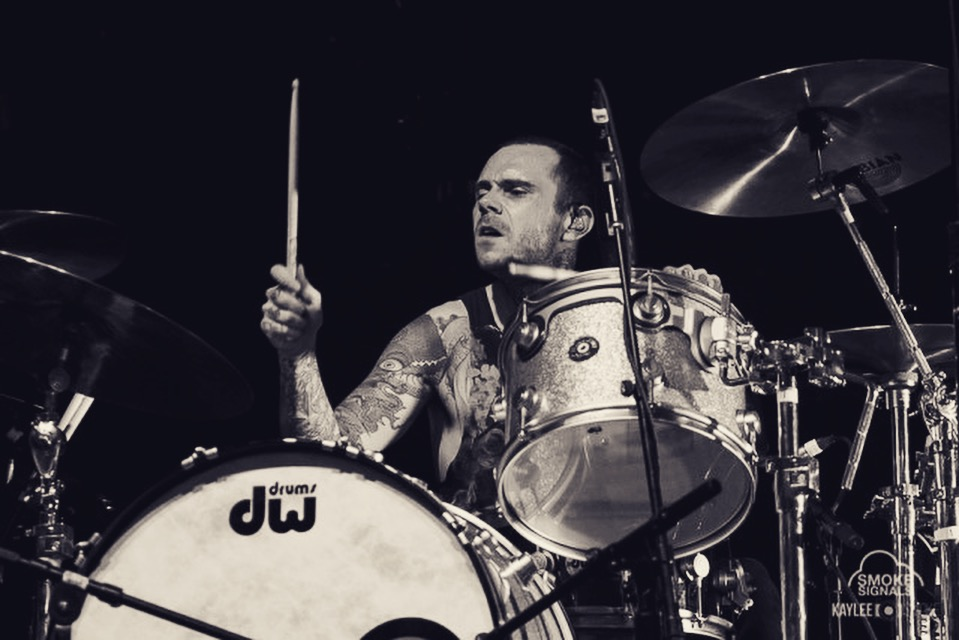
- Pierce in 2016.

Background information
- Origin: London, Ontario, Canada
- Genres: Pop, R&B, pop rock, alternative rock, post-grunge, hard rock, grunge, pop punk, power pop, emo pop, emo, indie rock, electropop, dance-pop, indie pop
- Occupation: Drummer
- Instrument: Drums
- Website: www.jasonpiercedrum.com

Jason Pierce is a Canadian drummer, currently the drummer of the Canadian band Our Lady Peace since 2014.

== Career ==
During the 2000s, Pierce was a member of the Canadian band The Weekend.

In 2012, Pierce performed drums on the Evans Blue album Graveyard of Empires. He was also the drummer for Treble Charger for a time.

In 2014, while in search of a replacement drummer, Our Lady Peace enlisted Pierce to perform during live shows. In 2016, he officially joined the band as their full-time drummer.

He has also toured with Carly Rae Jepsen, Justin Bieber, Paramore, Dallas Green, and Chantal Kreviazuk, among others.
