= Our Lady Peace =

Canadian rock band

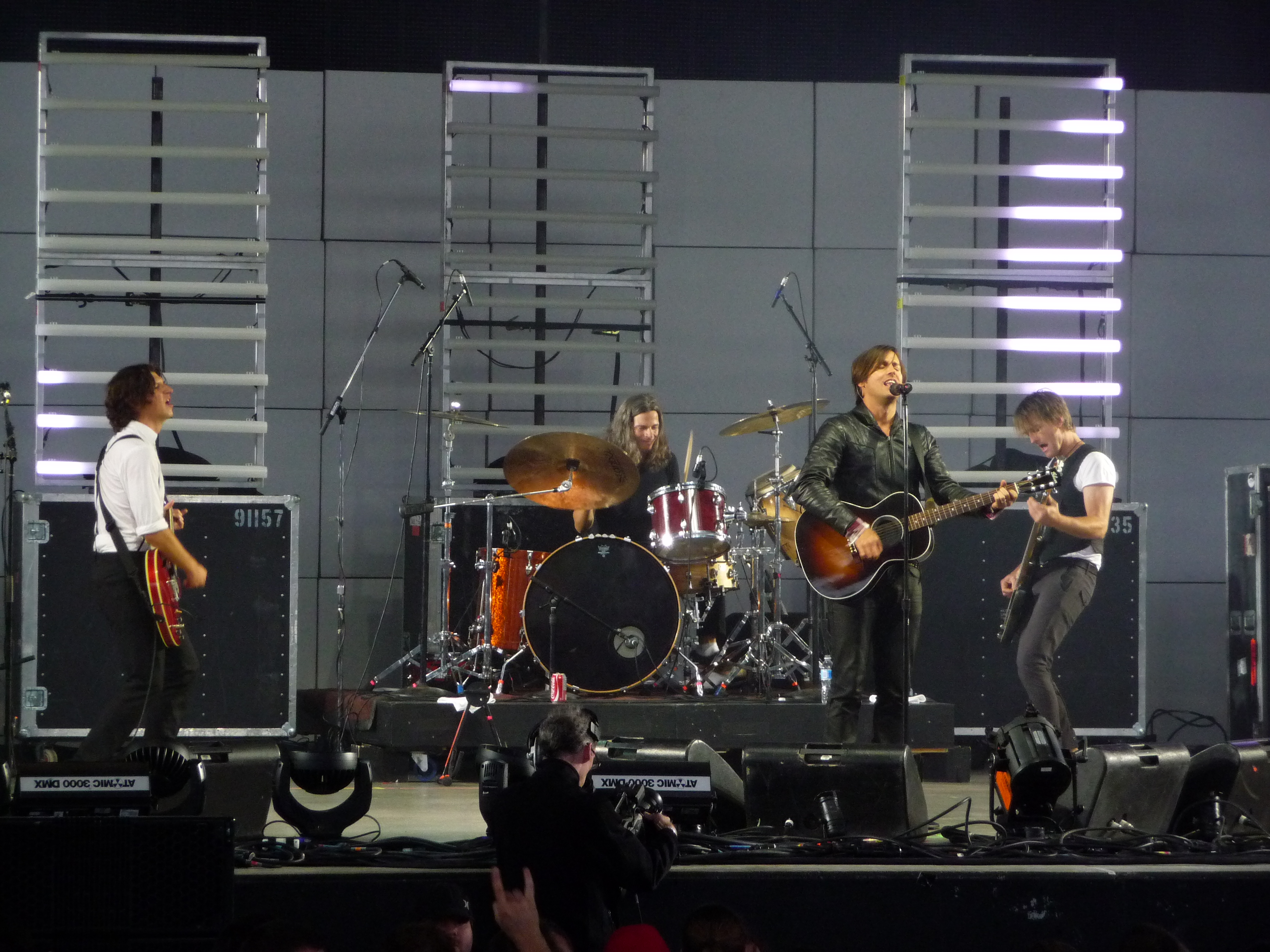
- Our Lady Peace performing in 2009

Background information
- Also known as: OLP
- Origin: Toronto, Ontario, Canada
- Genres: Alternative rock; post-grunge
- Years active: 1992–present
- Labels: Sony Music Canada; Relativity; Columbia; Coalition; Warner
- Members: Raine Maida; Duncan Coutts; Steve Mazur; Jason Pierce
- Past members: Mike Turner; Jeremy Taggart; Jamie Edwards; Robin Hatch; Chris Eacrett; Jim Newell; Paul Martin
- Website: ourladypeace.com

Our Lady Peace (sometimes shortened to OLP) is a Canadian alternative rock band formed in Toronto, Ontario in 1992. Led by lead vocalist Raine Maida since its formation, the band currently also features Duncan Coutts on bass, Steve Mazur on guitars, and Jason Pierce on drums. The band has sold several million albums worldwide, won four Juno Awards, and won ten MuchMusic Video Awards—the most MMVAs ever awarded to a band (tied with Billy Talent). Nineteen of their singles have reached the Top Ten on one of Canada's singles charts (those being the overall Singles Chart, the Rock Chart and the Alternative Rock Chart). Between 1996 and 2016, Our Lady Peace was the third best-selling Canadian band and the ninth best-selling Canadian artist overall in Canada.

Our Lady Peace has released ten studio albums, one live album, and two compilation albums, with their debut album, 1994's Naveed, having reached quadruple platinum in Canada. Naveed contains their breakthrough single, "Starseed", which peaked in the Top Ten on both the US Mainstream and Alternative Rock Tracks charts, and the title track, which reached No. 4 on Canada's Alternative Rock Chart. Their 1997 album, Clumsy, which reached No. 1 in Canada, is considered their signature and most widely recognized work. Clumsy was certified as Diamond in sales in Canada with its title track reaching No. 1 on Canada's Singles Chart and its lead single, "Superman's Dead", reaching No. 2 on Canada's Alternative Rock Chart. The album was certified platinum in sales in the US with the title track peaking at No. 5 on the US Alternative Rock chart. OLP's 1999 album, Happiness... Is Not a Fish That You Can Catch, also reached No. 1 in Canada and was certified triple platinum there. Its singles "One Man Army" and "Is Anybody Home?" reached Nos. 1 and 2 on Canada's Alternative Rock Chart. The band's first four albums are often praised for their unique sound and style, with singer Maida being called "erratic" and "truly unrivaled" as a vocalist.

Their fifth album, Gravity (2002), is considered to be a "radical departure" from the band's distinctive style. Maida confirmed the change, calling Gravity "vastly different" from their previous records. Gravity reached No. 2 in Canada, where it became the group's fifth straight (and last) double platinum seller, with "Somewhere Out There" and "Innocent" reaching No. 1 and 2, respectively, on Canada's Singles Chart. Gravity was their highest charting album in the United States, reaching No. 9; "Somewhere Out There" was their most successful single on the US Hot 100 (No. 26) and reached No. 7 on the US Alternative Rock Chart. Their 2005 album Healthy in Paranoid Times also peaked at No. 2 in Canada and went platinum in sales.

Having released three studio albums with only moderate success between 2009 and 2018, their sequel album Spiritual Machines 2 was released in 2021. The album's first single, "Stop Making Stupid People Famous" (feat. Pussy Riot), was released in June 2021.

== History ==
=== Formative years (1991–1993) ===
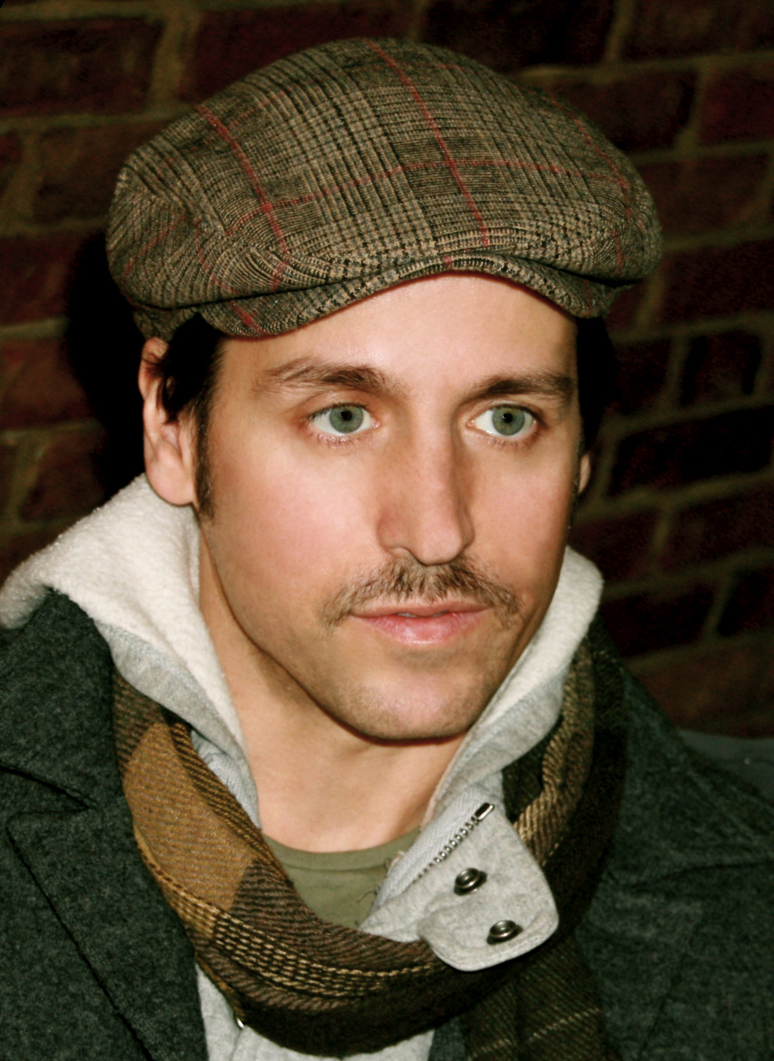
Raine Maida co-founded the band with Mike Turner in 1992.

In late 1991, guitarist Mike Turner placed an ad in Toronto-based Now newspaper in search of musicians. Michael Maida, a criminology student at the University of Toronto, was the first to reply. The two formed a band called As If, inviting Jim Newell as drummer and a friend of Turner's, Paul Martin, to play bass. After they played a number of gigs in Oshawa with sets containing a mix of original and cover material, Martin departed, and the band placed an ad for a replacement bassist. Chris Eacrett, a business student at Ryerson University, replied and was accepted after an audition. During that time, Turner and Maida attended a music seminar where they met songwriter and producer Arnold Lanni, the owner of Arnyard Studios. The band, with Lanni, commenced writing new material and recorded some material under the As If name.

Soon after, the band's name was changed to Our Lady Peace, after a Mark Van Doren poem of the same name. With encouragement from Lanni and his management team, the band performed some gigs in Eastern Ontario and Montreal in conjunction with The Tea Party. It was during this time that Maida began using the stage name "Raine" instead of "Mike".

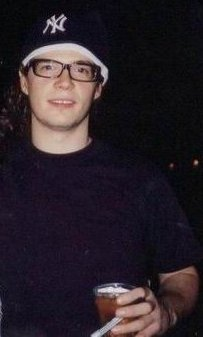
Jeremy Taggart joined the band as drummer in April 1993.

An independent music video of the band's debut song "Out of Here" was created in February 1992 by Sam Siciliano, a film student and friend of Turner's, who produced, edited, and directed the video. The video was aired on the MuchMusic Indie show. After returning to Arnyard Studios to continue writing and recording material, drummer Jim Newell departed the band. Writing and recording continued with session drummer John Bouvette.

With managers Rob Lanni and Eric Lawrence of Coalition Entertainment representing the band, short showcases were arranged with Warner Music Canada, EMI Canada, and Sony Music Canada. Sony Music Canada head of A&R Richard Zuckerman liked what he heard, and saw the potential of the band, its producer, and management. The band signed a record and publishing deal with Sony Music Canada in April 1993, and commenced writing for their debut album. Around the same time, then-17-year-old Jeremy Taggart joined the band as permanent drummer.

=== Early success (1994–2000) ===
After writing and recording over the next year or so, OLP released its debut album, Naveed, in Canada in March 1994, through Sony Music Canada. The first single from the album, "The Birdman", was released in January 1994 but did not obtain enough airplay to chart on the Canadian RPM Top 100 Singles Chart. Maida would later say "The Birdman" was chosen as the lead single because its non-commercial sound would likely appeal to university campus radio on which OLP hoped to develop "a buzz", and that waiting a few months to release a more commercial song gave them time to tour with other bands in order to improve their live show. Following the release of the album, the band toured Canada, supporting acts I Mother Earth and 54-40. The second single was "Starseed" which almost made the Top 40 on the RPM Top 100 Chart; there was no national rock and alternative song chart at that time, but "Starseed" was ranked at No. 25 on the Top Songs of the 1990s according to 102.1 The Edge, Toronto's most popular alternative/modern rock station. The third and fourth singles released in Canada were "Hope" and "Supersatellite" with each receiving moderate airplay, but it was the fifth single, the title track which drove sales of the album, as the track it went to No. 4 on the new RPM Rock/Alternative Singles Chart and was later ranked as the No. 50 alternative rock song of the 1990s by 102.1 The Edge. Naveed rose to No. 12 on the Canadian RPM Album Chart and was certified 4× Platinum for sales of 400,000 copies in Canada.

Naveed picked up and released in the United States in March 1995 by a Sony Music indie label, Relativity Records, after which the band toured as the opening act for Van Halen's Balance summer tour as well as opening shows for Jimmy Page and Robert Plant. "Starseed" was a significant hit in United States reaching Nos. 7 and 11 on the Billboard Modern and Mainstream Rock Charts, respectively. Touring behind the album resumed in 1996 with time spent opening for Alanis Morissette. A remix of "Starseed" would later be added to the Armageddon film soundtrack. In early 1997, Our Lady Peace was offered (and the band accepted) an American signing with Columbia Records, expanding their horizons within Sony Music. After touring for the album Naveed concluded, the band began work on their second studio album. As the writing process ensued, bassist Chris Eacrett left the band due to musical differences. Duncan Coutts, a Ridley College alumnus and former classmate of Raine Maida, joined the band during the recording of that second album. Coincidentally, Duncan Coutts and Mike Turner both studied at the University of Western Ontario and lived in Saugeen–Maitland Hall.

"Automatic Flowers"
A clip of the Clumsy single "Automatic Flowers"

Our Lady Peace's second album, Clumsy, was released in January 1997. The album cover is based on an abandoned song called "Trapeze", which was initially intended to be the title of the album. The albums's lead single, the guitar-driven "Superman's Dead", quickly rose to No. 2 for five weeks on Canada's Alternative Rock Songs chart pushing the album to debut at No. 1 on the Canadian Album Chart. The second single, "Clumsy", was just as successful, topping the Canadian RPM Singles chart while also reaching No. 2 on the Alternative Rock Chart. Subsequent singles "Automatic Flowers" and "4 AM", the band's first ballad released as a single, also made the Top 10 on the Alternative Rock chart establishing Our Lady Peace as a leading band in the Canadian rock scene. The most-listened to alternative rock station in Canada, Toronto's CFNY, listed Clumsy as the No. 1 album for 1997, based on sales, listener requests for songs, and listener votes for the year's top album. In February 2001, Clumsy was certified Diamond (1 million copies) in sales in Canada. Between 1996 and 2017, Clumsy was the best-selling album by a Canadian band in Canada and the eight best-selling album by a Canadian artist overall in Canada. In the US, both "Superman's Dead" and "Clumsy" made the Top 15 on the Mainstream Rock Tracks chart, while peaking at No. 11 and No. 5, respectively, on the Alternative Rock Tracks Chart. Clumsy reached the Top 80 on the Billboard Album Chart and was certified Platinum for sales of 1 million units in the US.

In 1999, Our Lady Peace released their third album, titled Happiness... Is Not a Fish That You Can Catch. The album included such hits as "Thief", a song about a young girl the band met named Mina Kim, who had cancer, as well as "One Man Army" and "Is Anybody Home?". Legendary jazz drummer Elvin Jones was featured on the song "Stealing Babies". Multi-instrumentalist Jamie Edwards was brought in for the 1996 sessions for the album (he remained an unofficial member of the band until 2001, when he was asked to officially join the band to finish the Gravity album). Later that year, the band played an eleven-song set at Woodstock 1999.

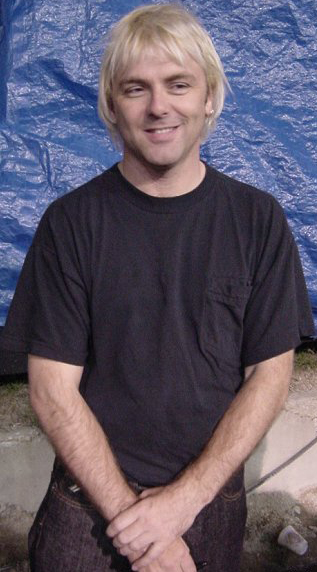
The exact circumstances surrounding former lead guitarist Mike Turner's 2001 departure are disputed.

In 2000, the band recorded and released Spiritual Machines, a concept album inspired by Ray Kurzweil's book The Age of Spiritual Machines. During the recording of the album, drummer Jeremy Taggart was sidelined with an ankle injury; Soundgarden and Pearl Jam drummer Matt Cameron, played drums on "Right Behind You (Mafia)" and "Are You Sad?" in his place. The album featured the singles "In Repair", "Life" and "Right Behind You (Mafia)". "Life" was also featured in the soundtrack for the Canadian sports comedy film Men with Brooms. Spiritual Machines was less commercially successful than its predecessors.

=== Line-up and stylistic changes (2001–2005) ===
By the early 2000s, the band was becoming restless, feeling a "numbness" with their popularity as well as the "over-saturation" of their songs on Canadian radio. The band almost broke up after completing their Spiritual Machines tour.

In December 2001, having dropped original producer Arnold Lanni, the band met with new producer Bob Rock to start work on their fifth album. Later the following month, founding guitarist Mike Turner either quit the band or was forced out due to the other members' concerns about his guitar-playing abilities. Said Maida of Turner's departure, "The last two records we've been yearning for a guitar player that can really stand up and have a strong voice and Mike (Turner) just wasn't that kind of guitar player." Turner later formed the band Fair Ground with Harem Scarem guitarist Pete Lesperance and later joined the band Crash Karma. Turner's last performance with the band was for Music Without Borders at Toronto's Air Canada Centre on October 21, 2001. In the months following Turner's departure, the band held auditions for a replacement lead guitarist. Berklee College of Music alumnus Steve Mazur, a friend of a friend of drummer Jeremy Taggart, was announced as the new guitarist in April 2002. Long-time touring musician Jamie Edwards also became an official band member around this time.

In June, their fifth album, Gravity, was completed and released. Shortly after the completion of the record, Jamie chose to leave the band for personal reasons, though he returned briefly to stand in for Mike Eisenstein during the Canadian tour of Gravity. The album received mixed reviews, with some critics and fans contending that the album was too drastic a departure from the band's original musical style into a more mainstream sound and lacking any creativity. Maida's signature nasal falsetto vocal technique was largely absent from the album. Maida said that the album was "pretty much the opposite of Spiritual Machines", calling it their "most basic album" since Naveed. Gravity's Canadian chart-topping first single, "Somewhere Out There", became the band's biggest international hit to date peaking at No. 26 on the US Hot 100 and No. 7 on the US Alternative Rock Song Chart. Its second single, "Innocent", was also very popular, peaking at No. 2 in Canada, and regained popularity in 2008 after a cover performance on American Idol. Gravity proved to be more successful than Spiritual Machines in both America and Canada, due to the success of the singles; it reached No. 2 in Canada and No. 9 in the US, their highest charting album in the US. In between their fifth and sixth albums, OLP released their first live album, titled simply Live, which contains a selection of the band's hits from their first five albums as played throughout tours in various Canadian cities.

In August 2005, the band released their sixth album, Healthy in Paranoid Times, which included the singles "Angels/Losing/Sleep", "Will the Future Blame Us", and "Where Are You?" According to Rolling Stone, it took 1165 days to create it, and its twelve tracks were chosen from forty-five that the band had written and produced. Maida has since criticized Healthy in Paranoid Times, saying that "(the) record was total excess, total bullshit in the sense of, we finally had succumbed to a label: making us record that many songs, trying to find the right singles for American radio and MTV." After nearly breaking up during the recording of Healthy in Paranoid Times the band took a prolonged hiatus.

=== Compilations, hiatus, and Burn Burn (2006–2009) ===
In November 2006, Columbia Records released a greatest hits compilation titled A Decade, following the band's departure from the label. There were two previously unreleased songs on the album, "Kiss on the Mouth" and "Better Than Here". Steve Mazur wrote in a blog on the band's fan club that the new songs on the disc were two unreleased songs from the Healthy in Paranoid Times sessions. The collection also included a bonus DVD containing live concert footage and exclusive interviews at the Massey Hall concert. The single "Kiss on the Mouth", the first off A Decade, has received play on radio stations across Canada. Lead vocalist Raine Maida began work on his first solo album, The Hunters Lullaby, released in 2007, while the remaining members of the band pursued other personal endeavours. The hiatus would result in the longest time gap between OLP studio albums to date.

The band began working on Burn Burn, their seventh studio album, in February 2007. On March 31, 2009, Legacy Recordings released OLP's second compilation album, The Very Best of Our Lady Peace as part of the Playlist series. The album includes the popular singles "Naveed" and "Somewhere Out There", as well as lesser-known songs such as "Car Crash" and "Stealing Babies". That same month, the band completed the new material, with Raine calling the new album "huge", and noted it as being a "proper rock album again", featuring a return to the raw originality of the band's first album Naveed, though a "little more mature". Maida produced the album himself, noting his excitement over "not (having had) anybody intrude on (recording) sessions". The album was released in North America on July 21, 2009, to mixed reviews, though the album later received Gold status in Canada. The band toured to promote Burn Burn and made stops in several cities across North America from July through December 2009.

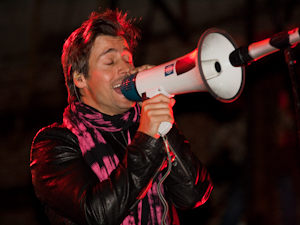
Maida performing with a megaphone during OLP's Clumsy and Spiritual Machines recreation tour

=== Recreation tour and Curve (2010–2012) ===
In December 2009, the band announced a new tour. In a tour that ran from March to May 2010, and spanned Canada and select U.S. cities, the band "recreated" both their 1997 album Clumsy and their 2000 album Spiritual Machines in their entirety.

Our Lady Peace's eighth studio album, Curve, began production in January 2010 and was released April 3, 2012. The album's first single, "Heavyweight", was released on December 20, 2011. In a March 2010 interview, lead singer Raine Maida noted that after having gone back to re-learn songs from Spiritual Machines and Clumsy in preparation for their tour, he was "brought back to the great things about this band". He added that fans—especially those who are particularly fond of the pre-Gravity albums—should expect to see "a lot of stuff (from pre-Gravity albums) creeping its way back into our music".

In 2012, the band released a song titled "Fight the Good Fight" in reaction to the Occupy Wall Street events that took place across North America in late 2011 for Occupy This Album.

=== Taggart's departure and Somethingness (2014–2018) ===
A planned tour to celebrate the 20th anniversary of Naveed was cancelled in early 2014 due to "scheduling conflicts". In June 2014, speculation began that longtime drummer Jeremy Taggart was no longer part of the band; this was confirmed in statements by both Taggart and Our Lady Peace on June 30, 2014. Canadian drummer Jason Pierce (ex-touring drummer for Paramore and current touring drummer for Treble Charger) filled in during live shows, and Jason Boesel of Rilo Kiley handled recording duties.

On April 30, 2014, Raine Maida revealed on his Twitter account that OLP was headed back into the studio with producer Mike Elizondo, in Los Angeles. On July 10, 2014, the band débuted their single, "Won't Turn Back", on Toronto's 102.1 The Edge radio station. On July 17, "Won't Turn Back" was released on iTunes in Canada. Maida described the song as "poppier" than much of their discography.

On November 20, the band tweeted that it would be releasing unreleased songs and b-side tracks via email subscription. The first song from the "OLP Vault" was "No Warning", released on November 27. A second, a demo of "Not Afraid" was released on December 11. A live cover of Lana Del Rey's "Summertime Sadness" was released on December 24 and on January 15, a demo version of Consequence of Laughing, named "Immune" was released from the vault. On January 28, "Hurt Yourself", a track recorded during Healthy in Paranoid Times, and released alongside #BellLetsTalk to raise awareness for mental illness, was released. On February 14, the band released a clip of the demo "Say". A full version of the song "Vampires" was released on March 2.

It was later announced that Pierce was now an official member of Our Lady Peace.

On August 11, 2017, the band announced the release of their ninth album, Somethingness, on their Facebook page. The band planned the release in the form of two EP volumes. The first single "Drop Me In The Water" was released on August 18, and the Vol. 1 EP was released on August 25, 2017. The full album (including the tracks from the Vol. 1 EP) was released on February 23, 2018.

=== Spiritual Machines 2 and "The Wonderful Future" tour (2019–2025) ===
In May 2019, the Republican-American reported that a tenth studio album by Our Lady Peace was in the works, which, according to Maida, would continue "the guitar-driven approach." In August 2020, it was revealed that album will be titled Spiritual Machines 2, and will be a direct sequel to the band's 2000 album Spiritual Machines. Spiritual Machines 2 was produced by Dave Sitek, and its genre has been described by the band as "future rock". In June 2021, the band's official Facebook account hinted that original co-founder and guitarist Mike Turner would be a featured guest on the album. Raine Maida later confirmed that Turner had indeed returned, stating that Spiritual Machines 2 wouldn't have been "right without Mike involved".

In June 2022, the band began a cross-country tour called "The Wonderful Future Theatrical Experience", named after the final song on their 2000 album Spiritual Machines. The tour featured what have been referred to as holographic display capsules, which were placed on stage in advance of the live show, and contained a video screen that displayed selected pre-recorded videos of band members as well as various special guests. Special guests appearing through the holographic technology included Sarah Slean, Nadezhda Tolokonnikova, Ray Kurzweil, and former OLP guitarist Mike Turner. Turner also played guitar live in person (alongside his successor Steve Mazur) at select venues, which is the first time he performed on stage with Our Lady Peace since his original departure from the band in 2001. In December 2022, the band released a rendition of Jane's Addiction "Mountain Song".

=== 30th Anniversary Tour; Return of "Whatever" (2025–present) ===
The band began a tour to celebrate their 30th anniversary in February 2025. All dates are in Canada. On the first night of their 30th Anniversary Tour in Calgary, the band played "Whatever" live for the first time in 22 years after deciding it was time for them to "reclaim the song". The band had not played the song due to its connection to professional wrestler Chris Benoit, who was using the song as his entrance theme in WWE at the time of his double-murder and suicide. The band released a re-recorded version of the song called "Whatever (Redux)" in July and announced that all of the revenue made from the song will be donated to suicide prevention initiatives.

On 16 October 2025, it was announced the band will perform the SiriusXM Kickoff show at the Canadian Football League's 112th Grey Cup.

Gail, a 2026 documentary film by Michael Maxxis, follows a "superfan" of the band who follows them across Canada attending multiple concerts on the tour.

== Summersault festivals ==
Our Lady Peace founded the Summersault festival that toured across Canada in 1998, and again in 2000. The 1998 tour ran from late August to early September at outdoor venues in Barrie (north of Toronto), Quebec City, St. John's and Shediac, New Brunswick. The concerts featured headliners Our Lady Peace along with a slate that included I Mother Earth, Sloan, Garbage, Treble Charger, Bucket Truck, The Crystal Method and Moist. The Barrie edition of the inaugural Summersault tour sold 21,108 tickets.

There were discussions of a Summersault festival for 1999, but the tour did not return until 2000; the second iteration of the festival featured a larger, more impressive roster of bands, with a more extensive Canadian itinerary. Over the first half of August 2000, the festival played at outdoor venues in eight of the largest Canadian metropolises.

Our Lady Peace's headlining set from the 2019 Summersault Festival was released on YouTube Live in 2020. Primarily filmed on September 13, 2019, at Landsdowne Park in Canada's capital city of Ottawa, ON. The performance features some of the band's best-known hits. As part of the release of the concert, Our Lady Peace offered discounts at their online merch store. All proceeds from the sales went to two major food banks, one in the United States and one in Canada, respectively.

Date	City	Venue
August 4	Vancouver	BC Place
August 6	Edmonton	Commonwealth Stadium
August 7	Saskatoon	Saskatchewan Place
August 9	Winnipeg	Winnipeg Stadium
August 11	Barrie	Molson Park
August 12	Montreal	Parc Jean-Drapeau
August 13	Ottawa	Rideau Carleton Raceway
August 16	Halifax	Citadel Hill

The 2000 tour featured 11 bands.

Band
The Smashing Pumpkins
Our Lady Peace
Foo Fighters
A Perfect Circle
Deftones
I Mother Earth
Eve 6
Catherine Wheel
Treble Charger
Sum 41
Finger Eleven

Summersault Festival (2019)
DATE	CITY
September 1	Quebec City, QC
September 10	Moncton, NB
September 12	Montreal, QC
September 13	Ottawa, ON
September 15	Toronto, ON

2019 Festival lineup:

- Our Lady Peace
- Bush
- Live
- Dear Rouge
- Human Kebab

== Musical style and themes ==
Our Lady Peace is mainly described as post-grunge and alternative rock.

In the band's early years, especially on Naveed and Clumsy, their overall sound was often compared to alternative rock and grunge bands including Soundgarden, The Smashing Pumpkins, and Pearl Jam. The band's melodic structure was also said to echo that of bands such as The Beatles and Led Zeppelin. Lead singer Raine Maida expresses much admiration for vocalist Mike Patton and his versatility, calling him "by far one of the best singers and best showmen in rock", while also naming the song "Everything's Ruined" by his band Faith No More among his favorites. Maida's voice was called "erratic" and "truly unrivaled" in his field. In albums Naveed through Spiritual Machines, Maida sang in a countertenor vocal register and was known for his frequent use of falsetto. This singing method, in combination with the band's melody structure, often gave many songs a surreal sound and effect.

== Band members ==
Current members

- Raine Maida – lead vocals, rhythm guitar, acoustic guitar (1992–present)
- Duncan Coutts – bass, backing vocals (1995–present)
- Steve Mazur – lead guitar, keyboards, backing vocals (2002–present)
- Jason Pierce – drums, percussion (2016–present; touring member 2014–2016)

Former members

- Jeremy Taggart – drums, percussion (1993–2014)
- Jamie Edwards – guitar, keyboards (2000–2002; touring member 1998–2000)
- Mike Turner – lead guitar, backing vocals (1992–2001; guest 2021–2022)
- Chris Eacrett – bass, backing vocals (1992–1995)
- Jim Newell – drums (1992–1993)
- Paul Martin – bass (1992)

Touring/session members

- John Bouvette – drums (1993)
- Mike Eisenstein – guitar, keyboards (2002–2003)
- Joel Shearer – guitar (2005–2006)
- Robin Hatch – keyboards (2012–2016)
- Jason Boesel - drums (2014)

== Discography ==
- Naveed (1994)
- Clumsy (1997)
- Happiness... Is Not a Fish That You Can Catch (1999)
- Spiritual Machines (2000)
- Gravity (2002)
- Healthy in Paranoid Times (2005)
- Burn Burn (2009)
- Curve (2012)
- Somethingness (2018)
- Spiritual Machines 2 (2021)
