= Innocent (Our Lady Peace song) =

2002 single by Our Lady Peace

Single by Our Lady Peace

from the album Gravity
- B-side: "Whatever" (live)
- Released: August 13, 2002
- Length: 3:42
- Label: Columbia; Epic
- Songwriter: Raine Maida
- Producer: Bob Rock

Our Lady Peace singles chronology
"Somewhere Out There" (2002)	"Innocent" (2002)	"Where Are You" (2005)

Music video
- "Innocent" on YouTube

"Innocent" is a song by Canadian alternative rock band Our Lady Peace. Written by lead vocalist Raine Maida, it was released in August 2002 as the second single from the band's fifth studio album, Gravity. It reached the top 40 on two US Billboard rock charts, as well as on the New Zealand Singles Chart.

== Background and writing ==
Maida said in 2002 that "Innocent" was one of his favorite songs from Gravity. "I wrote this song over a year ago and I was originally hesitant to play it for the band, but once we got into the studio and began working with Bob we were able to make it an Our Lady Peace song." According to Maida, the song's title was originally "Arrogant" and it had different lyrics. The producer, Bob Rock, made him rewrite most of the songs from Gravity in order to make them more accessible and easier to understand.

== Content ==
The song is about young people who are going through a difficult phase in their lives, namely Johnny, who wants to be a famous musician but struggles with writing songs, and Tina, who is insecure about her body and appearance. The song refers to the musicians John Lennon and Kurt Cobain.

== Recording ==
Local school children in Hawaii sang backing vocals on the chorus of the song. Before Mike Turner left the band, he recorded the rhythm guitar for this track. It was later interlaced with Steve Mazur's guitar playing for the final recording, but Turner's style of playing is still recognizable.

== Music video ==
The music video for "Innocent" was filmed on August 31, 2002, in Syracuse, Los Angeles, New Orleans and a school parking lot in Toronto. It shows the band performing in an alley while showing people going through various struggles. The video won two MuchMusic Video Awards in 2003, including "Best Video".

== Track listing ==
Canadian CD single

1. "Innocent" (album version) – 3:42
2. "Whatever" (live) – 4:00

== Charts ==
=== Weekly charts ===
Chart (2002–2003)	Peak position
Canada CHR (Nielsen BDS)	16
New Zealand (Recorded Music NZ)	20
US Alternative Airplay (Billboard)	20
US Mainstream Rock (Billboard)	35

=== Year-end charts ===
Chart (2002)	Position
Canada Radio (Nielsen BDS)	89
US Modern Rock Tracks (Billboard)	78

== Release history ==
Region	Date	Format	Label	Ref.
Canada	August 13, 2002	Radio airplay	Columbia	
United States	August 13, 2002	Radio airplay	Columbia	
Denmark	March 10, 2003	CD	Epic	
