= Haʻikū, Hawaii =

Unincorporated community in Hawaii, United States

Haʻikū
- Unincorporated community
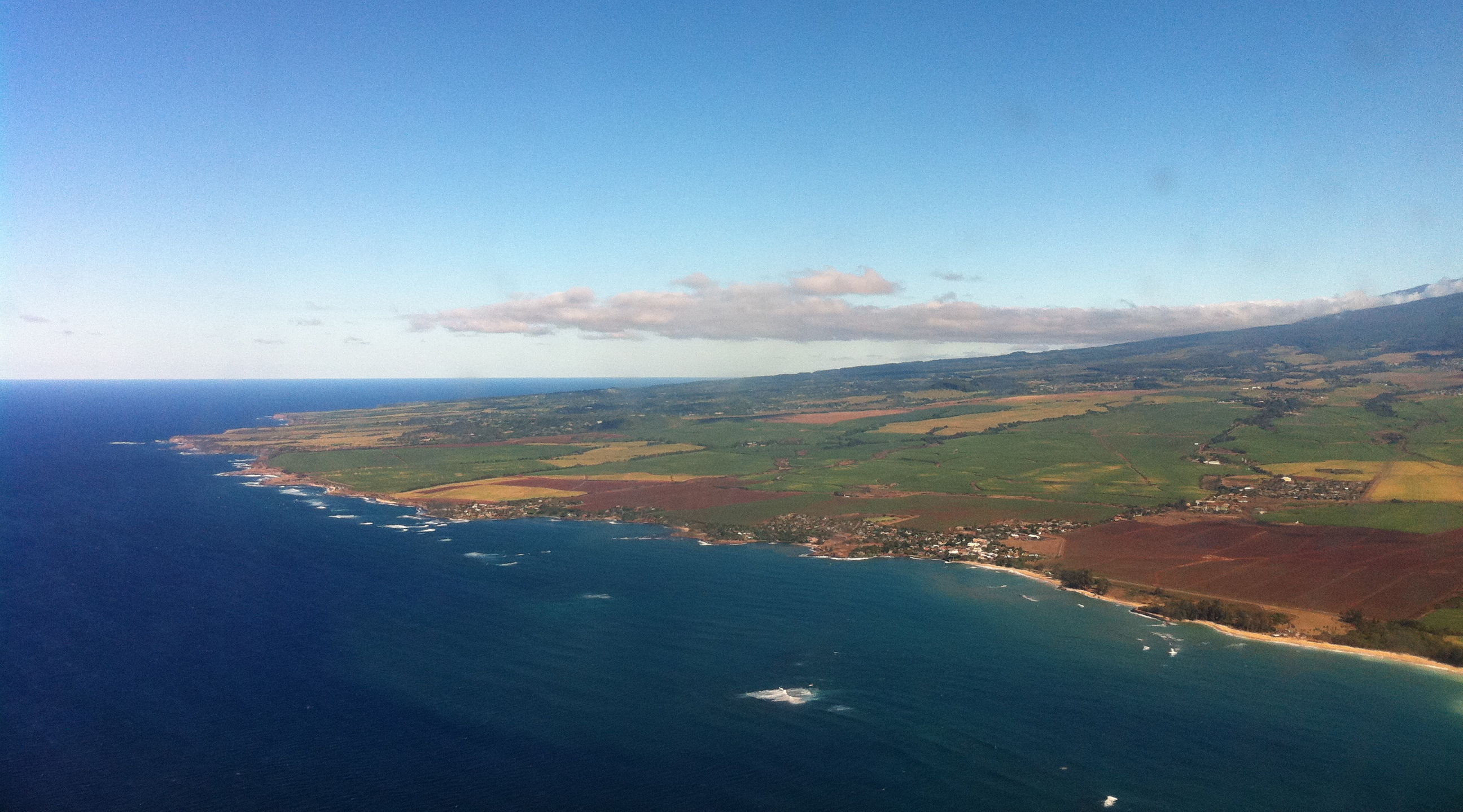
- North Shore Maui with Haiku and Paia neighborhoods

- Location within the state of Hawaii
- Coordinates: 20°55′03″N 156°19′33″W
- Country: United States
- State: Hawaii
- County: Maui
- Time zone: UTC−10 (Hawaii–Aleutian)
- ZIP code: 96708
- Area code: 808
- GNIS feature ID: 358858

Haʻikū is an unincorporated community in Maui County on the island of Maui in the state of Hawaii. For United States Census purposes, it is part of the Haʻikū-Pauwela census-designated place, which also includes Pauwela.

Haʻikū was named for the ancient Hawaiian land section of Haʻikū, which is Hawaiian for "talk abruptly" or "sharp break".
