= Jeremy Taggart =

Canadian drummer, radio host, and author (born 1975)

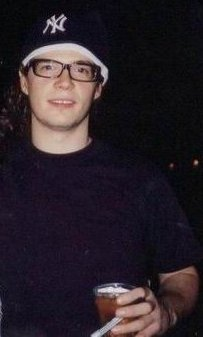
- Taggart in December 2002

Background information
- Born: Jeremy Ronald John Taggart; April 7, 1975 (age 51)
- Origin: Toronto, Ontario, Canada
- Occupations: Musician, songwriter
- Instrument: Drums
- Years active: 1993–present
- Member of: ALT CTRL
- Formerly of: Our Lady Peace
- Website: Jeremy Taggart on Myspace; TAGGART And TORRENS Podcast

Jeremy Ronald John Taggart (born April 7, 1975) is a Canadian drummer, radio host, and author, best known for playing with Our Lady Peace from 1993 until 2014.

== Early life ==
Taggart was born in Toronto, Ontario, later growing up in Mansfield, Ontario, and has two brothers and one sister. Music was a central part of his youth, as his parents were also musicians, and Taggart learned to play drums at an early age. He has said the loss of R.J. Logan was a driving force to take his drumming to the next level. He auditioned for the then-up-and-coming Our Lady Peace in April 1993.

== Career ==
=== Our Lady Peace ===
In 1993, Jim Newell, the band's previous drummer, left Our Lady Peace due to commitment issues. The remaining members and their management held open auditions for his replacement. They auditioned over a hundred drummers, ultimately choosing Taggart, who was 17 at the time.

The band offered him the drumming position, which Taggart accepted. Our Lady Peace had also recently been given a record deal with Sony Music Canada.

In June 2014, Taggart announced that he had left Our Lady Peace and was not coming back.

=== Other projects ===
In addition to drumming for Our Lady Peace, Taggart has worked on various side projects, including providing the drums on Chantal Kreviazuk's song "Blue", Geddy Lee's song "Home on the Strange", and The Beautiful Unknown's song "Riot in the House of Ruin". He also appears in the music video for Chad Kroeger and Josey Scott's song, "Hero", off the Spider-Man soundtrack. Kroeger and Scott asked Taggart to appear in the video after Soundgarden drummer Matt Cameron was unable to appear at the video shoot.

He ran a radio/podcast show called Taggarts Take, which mixes interviews of bands and politicians with Taggart's personal remarks.

Taggart is also a member of the judging panel for the 10th and 11th annual Independent Music Awards. as well as judge for the 9th Season.

Taggart is involved in mentoring aspiring musicians such as Arkells.

He is also a frequent guest on TSN's, Jay and Dan Podcast, hosted by sportscasters Jay Onrait and Dan O'Toole.

In 2013, Taggart, who grew up in nearby Mansfield, emceed an event in Melanchton, Ontario, celebrating the decision by The Highland Companies to withdraw its license to start mining in the area for limestone. He became involved in stopping the mine when a childhood friend alerted him about the issue.

In January 2014, Jeremy teamed up with fellow Canadian Jonathan Torrens to create the Taggart and Torrens Podcast. They discuss everything from sports to politics and offer a unique Canadian "everyman" perspective on the issues. They also play games they have created such as "Poem Sayin" and "Callin Pranks". In October 2017, Taggart and Torrens released the paperback book Canadianity: Tales From The True North Strong And Freezing, "a collection of showbiz tales from the road and relatable everyday anecdotes, all wrapped up in a nostalgic fondness for this great country. Canadianity takes readers on a cross-country journey, shining the spotlight on notable local heroes (or bands), the best places to crush food and the greasiest watering holes, coast to coast to coast."

Taggart has been drumming for Canadian alternative rock band Limblifter since 2024.

== Personal life ==
Taggart is the cousin of Australian footballer Adam Taggart and musician Andrew Taggart.

Preceded by Jim Newell	Our Lady Peace percussionist 1993–2014	Succeeded by Jason Pierce
