= Starseed (song) =

Single by Our Lady Peace

from the album Naveed
- Released: May 16, 1994
- Recorded: 1994
- Length: 4:04
- Label: Sony; Epic; Relativity; (US)
- Songwriter: Our Lady Peace
- Producer: Arnold Lanni

Our Lady Peace singles chronology
"The Birdman" (1994)	"Starseed" (1994)	"Hope" (1994)

Music video
- "Starseed" on YouTube

"Starseed" is the second single from Our Lady Peace's first album Naveed, released in 1994. It was remixed and released on the soundtrack to Armageddon. In addition, a live version from the 2003 Live album was released as a single. The song was also planned to be included on the soundtrack for Drew Barrymore's 1995 film Mad Love but was left off. Art model Saul Fox makes a brief appearance in the music video and appears on the cover of the promotional single.

== Origins ==
According to Maida in an interview with the Winnipeg Free Press: "Starseed was written in five minutes. Chris [Eacrett] came up with the bass line and the vibe was so heavy we just wrote it." It only took the band twenty more minutes to record the song.

== Versions ==
The mix of "Starseed" released in the United States as a single and on the Armageddon soundtrack varies from the version released on Naveed. The ending of the song, which on Naveed ended cold after the last lyric was extended to a fadeout, stretching the song from its original 4 minutes, 7 seconds to 4 minutes and 19 seconds. This version is known as the "Armageddon Remix".

== Meaning ==
"It was based on this book by Ken Carey, The Starseed Transmissions, about a channeling experience he had. The whole chorus is about if you have had a channeling experience and during this experience you find something you believe and trying to convince everybody else is not always an easy task. I'm into a lot of meditating. My dad was Catholic and he tried to school me in that, but I never really agreed with him. I've always been interested in religion and the way it affects society. The Starseed thing is about going on a meditation journey and coming back with something tangible. Something you actually believe in. Something that means something to you. It is hard to convince people of my father's generation of anything other than the religious values instilled in them." - Raine Maida

== Track list ==
1. "Starseed"
2. "Supersatellite"

== Music video ==
The music video was produced by George Vale and is shot mostly in sepia tone. It was filmed at a former Sears warehouse in Toronto. The video has a very middle-eastern theme, akin to the rest of the album, showing people levitating and dressed in turbans. Future bassist Duncan Coutts makes a brief appearance in the video as an extra. During shooting, a light box that moved up and down fell three floors from the ceiling barely missing several band members. The Starseed video was seen on Beavis and Butt-head during the episode "Green Thumbs" in 1995. The outdoor portion of the music video was filmed at the Cheltenham Badlands in Caledon, Ontario.

== Charts ==
Chart (1994–1995)	Peak position
Canada Top Singles (RPM)	42
Canada Cancon (RPM)	1
US Alternative Airplay (Billboard)	10
US Mainstream Rock (Billboard)	7
