= Duncan Coutts =

Canadian musician

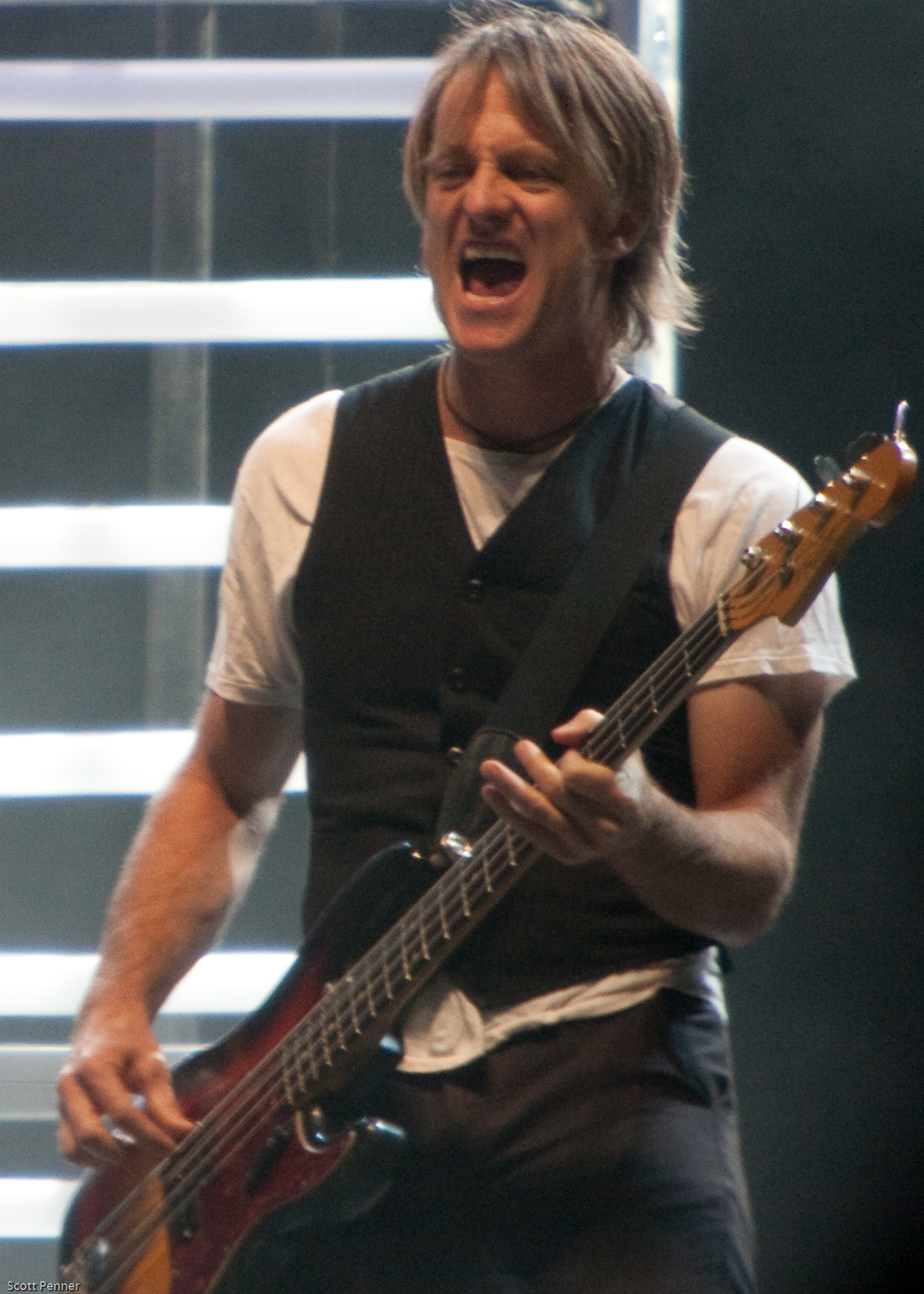
- Coutts performing in 2009

Background information
- Born: Robert Duncan M. Coutts; February 4, 1969 (age 57); St. Catharines, Ontario, Canada
- Origin: Toronto, Ontario, Canada
- Occupations: Musician, songwriter
- Instruments: Bass, keyboards, guitar, cello, vocals
- Years active: 1995–present
- Member of: Our Lady Peace

Robert Duncan Coutts (born February 4, 1969) is a Canadian musician, best known for being the bassist for Our Lady Peace since 1995.

== Career ==
=== Our Lady Peace ===
Coutts joined Our Lady Peace on September 23, 1995, replacing Chris Eacrett after the band's debut album Naveed was produced.

Before joining Our Lady Peace, he went to Ridley College and studied film at Toronto's Ryerson University, graduating from The University of Western Ontario in 1993. He lived in Saugeen-Maitland Hall at the University of Western Ontario along with fellow Our Lady Peace band member Mike Turner. This resulted in him not immediately joining Our Lady Peace, but waiting until after their debut album, Naveed. Nevertheless, he appears as an extra in the music video for the single, "Starseed", and was present in the studio during the recording of the album.

Among his jobs before joining the band were taxi driving in Whistler, British Columbia, and set dresser for the television show Due South. Along with bass, he can play keyboards, cello, and sing back up.

Preceded by Chris Eacrett	Our Lady Peace bassist 1995–present	Succeeded by Current
