= Steve Mazur =

American guitarist (born 1977)

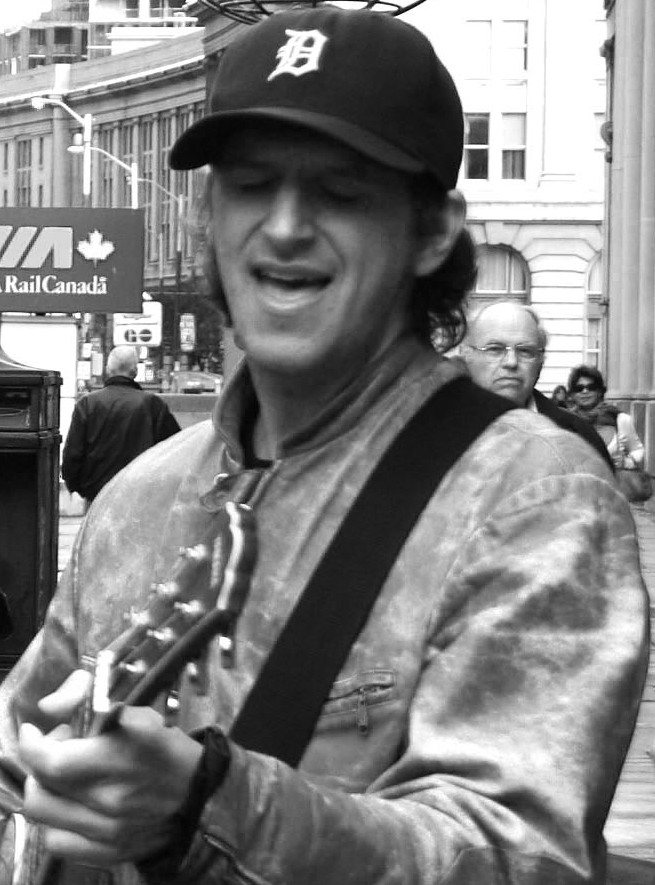

Background information
- Born: Steven Theodore Mazur; December 21, 1977 (age 48); Port Huron, Michigan, United States
- Origin: Los Angeles, United States
- Occupations: Musician, songwriter
- Instruments: Guitar, keyboards, vocals
- Years active: 2002–present

Steven Theodore Mazur (born December 21, 1977) is an American guitarist, best known as the lead guitarist for alternative rock band Our Lady Peace. Mazur replaced original band guitarist Mike Turner in 2002.

== Early life and education ==
Mazur has two sisters and two stepsisters and grew up in Richmond, Michigan, attending Cardinal Mooney Catholic College Preparatory High School in Marine City. He graduated from the Berklee College of Music in 2000. At the commencement ceremony, he performed a solo acoustic guitar version of "Think About It," written by Herb Alpert, Will Calhoun, and Doug Wimbish.

His first electric guitar was a black Yamaha RGX 112.

== Career ==
Before joining Our Lady Peace, he was in many different bands including Dragonfly (with Jeff Gutt on vocals), Butter Jackson, Ph (pronounced F), and Gabriel Mann's band. He played on the title track for the video game No One Lives Forever for the PlayStation 2. He also gave guitar lessons at Southern Thumb Music in Richmond and in Los Angeles.

=== Our Lady Peace ===
Mazur attended his first Our Lady Peace concert as a fan on July 10, 2001, at the House of Blues in Los Angeles.

Mazur replaced founding member Mike Turner as guitarist for Our Lady Peace during the recording of the band's fifth album, Gravity. Mazur was selected after the band sorted through thousands of audition tapes, CDs, videos, and DVDs, in search of a new guitar player.

Mazur's first appearance on stage with the band was at the video shoot for "Somewhere Out There", followed by his first concert on stage with the band on May 15, 2002, at The Asylum in Dayton, Ohio.

Preceded by Mike Turner	Our Lady Peace guitarist 2002–present	Succeeded by Current
