= Our Lady Peace discography =

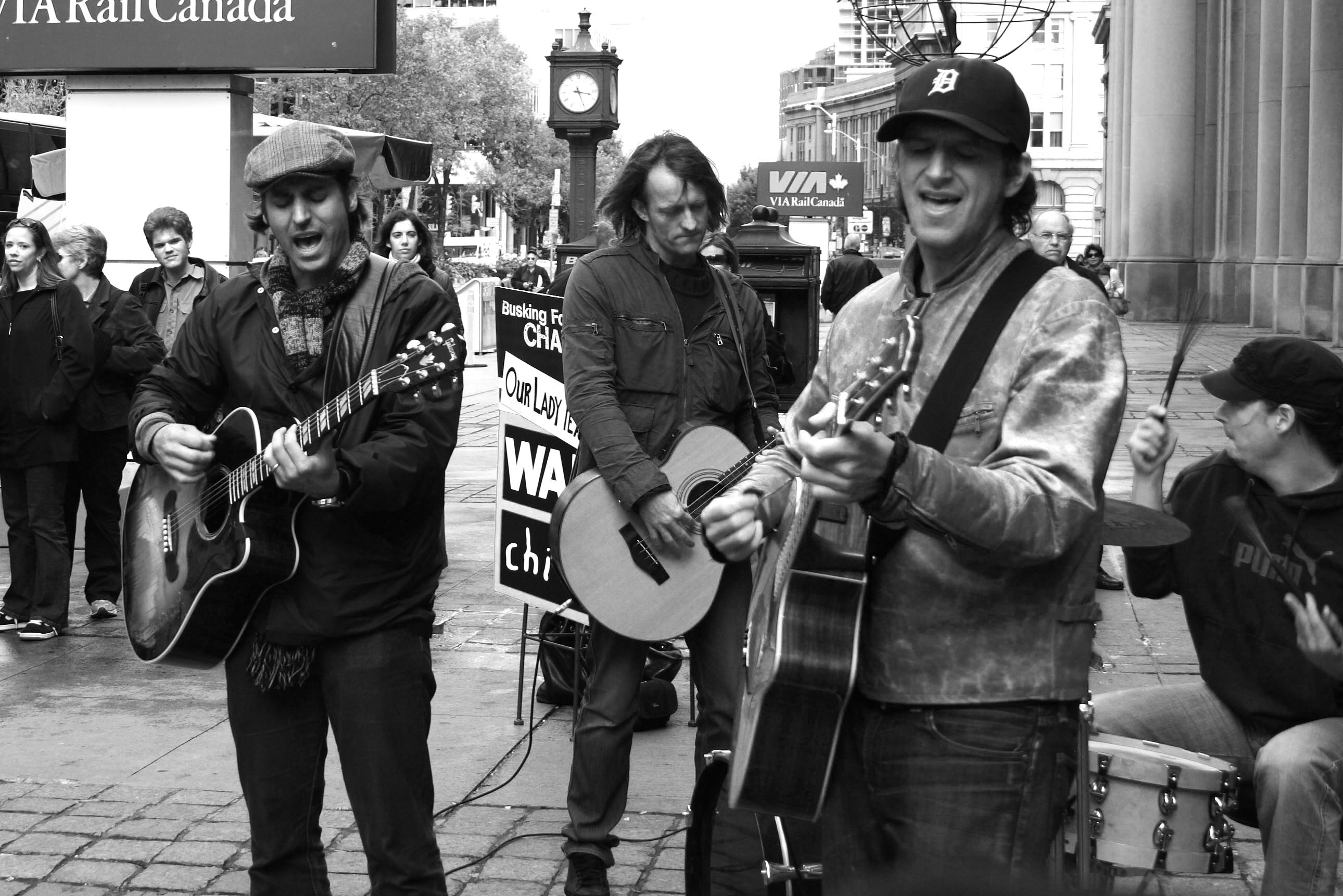
- Our Lady Peace members as of 2010, from left to right; Raine Maida, Duncan Coutts, Steve Mazur and Jeremy Taggart
- Studio albums: 10
- Live albums: 1
- Compilation albums: 2
- Singles: 28
- Music videos: 36

Between 1994 and 2021, Our Lady Peace have released thirteen total albums. These include ten studio albums, one live album, and two compilation albums.

The band has also released 30 singles to date, ranging from "The Birdman" in 1994, to their most recent, "Sound the Alarm", in 2024.

== Studio albums ==
Year	Details	Peak chart positions				Certifications
Year	Details	CAN	NZ	US	US Ind.	Certifications
1994	Naveed: Released: March 22, 1994; Label: Sony, Epic, Relativity (US); Formats: CD, CS	12	—	—	—	CAN: 4× Platinum
1997	Clumsy: Released: January 21, 1997; Label: Columbia; Formats: CD, CS	1	—	76	—	CAN: Diamond; US: Platinum
1999	Happiness... Is Not a Fish That You Can Catch: Released: September 21, 1999; Label: Columbia; Formats: CD, CS	1	—	69	—	CAN: 3× Platinum
2000	Spiritual Machines: Released: December 12, 2000; Label: Columbia; Formats: CD, CS	5	—	81	—	CAN: 2× Platinum
2002	Gravity: Released: June 18, 2002; Label: Columbia; Formats: CD, CS	2	24	9	—	CAN: 2× Platinum; US: Gold
2005	Healthy in Paranoid Times: Released: August 30, 2005; Label: Columbia; Formats: CD	2	—	45	—	CAN: Platinum
2009	Burn Burn: Released: July 21, 2009; Label: Coalition Entertainment; Formats: CD, LP	3	—	41	6	
2012	Curve: Released: April 3, 2012; Label: Warner; Formats: CD, LP	9	—	184	26	
2018	Somethingness: Released: February 23, 2018; Label: Coalition Entertainment; Formats: CD, LP, Digital Download	29	—	—	—	
2021	Spiritual Machines 2: Released: October 28, 2021; Label: Shelter Music Group (BMG); Formats: CD, LP, Digital Download	—	—	—	—	
"—" denotes a release that did not chart.

== Live albums ==
Year	Details	CAN	US
2003	Live: Released: June 24, 2003; Label: Columbia; Formats: CD	5	112

== Compilation albums ==
Year	Details	CAN
2006	A Decade: Released: November 21, 2006; Label: Columbia; Formats: CD	29
2009	The Very Best of Our Lady Peace: Released: March 31, 2009; Label: Legacy; Formats: CD	—
"—" denotes a release that did not chart.

== Singles ==
Year	Title	Peak chart positions								Album
Year	Title	CAN	CAN Alt.	CAN Rock	NZ	UK	US	US Main.	US Alt.	Album
1994	"The Birdman"	—	×		—	—	—	—	—	Naveed
1994	"Starseed"	42	×		—	—	—	7	10	Naveed
1994	"Hope"	62	×		—	—	—	—	—	Naveed
1995	"Supersatellite"	—	×		—	—	—	—	—	Naveed
1995	"Naveed"	63	4		—	—	—	—	— (Note: "Naveed" reached number 35 on the alternative chart published by Radio & Records dated August 18, 1995.)	Naveed
1997	"Superman's Dead"	17	2		—	—	75^{[A]}	14	11	Clumsy
1997	"Clumsy"	1	2		—	—	59^{[A]}	13	5	Clumsy
1997	"Automatic Flowers"	29	8		—	—	—	—	—	Clumsy
1997	"4am"	29	8		—	—	—	38	31	Clumsy
1999	"One Man Army"	—	1		—	70	—	16	13	Happiness... Is Not a Fish That You Can Catch
2000	"Is Anybody Home?"	—	2		—	—	—	27	20	Happiness... Is Not a Fish That You Can Catch
2000	"Thief"	—	5		—	—	—	—	—	Happiness... Is Not a Fish That You Can Catch
2000	"In Repair"	—	×		—	—	—	—	—	Spiritual Machines
2000	"Life"	12	×		—	—	—	—	27	Spiritual Machines
2001	"Right Behind You (Mafia)"	—	×		—	—	—	—	—	Spiritual Machines
2002	"Somewhere Out There"	4	×		—	—	44	26	7	Gravity
2002	"Innocent"	2	×		20	—	—	35	20	Gravity
2005	"Where Are You?"	16	×	3	—	—	—	—	28	Healthy in Paranoid Times
2005	"Angels/Losing/Sleep"	7	×	1	—	—	—	—	—	Healthy in Paranoid Times
2006	"Will the Future Blame Us?"	—	×	11	—	—	—	—	—	Healthy in Paranoid Times
2006	"Kiss on the Mouth"	—	×	12	—	—	—	—	—	A Decade
2009	"All You Did Was Save My Life"	12	2	4	—	—	—	—	36	Burn Burn
2009	"The End Is Where We Begin"	93	6	11	—	—	—	—	40	Burn Burn
2011	"Heavyweight"	89	5	1	—	—	—	—	—	Curve
2012	"As Fast As You Can"	—	—	—	—	—	—	—	—	Curve
2014	"Won't Turn Back"	—	—	—	—	—	—	—	—	Non-album single
2017	"Drop Me in the Water"	—	—	8	—	—	—	—	—	Somethingness
2021	"Stop Making Stupid People Famous" (featuring Pussy Riot)	—	—	4	—	—	—	—	—	Spiritual Machines II
2021	"Future Disease"	—	—	—	—	—	—	—	—	Spiritual Machines II
2024	"Sound the Alarm"	—	—	3	—	—	—	—	—	OLP30 Volume 1
2025	"I Wanna Be Your Drug"	—	—	21	—	—	—	—	—	OLP30 Volume 2
2025	"No Angels In This Town"	—	—	—	—	—	—	—	—	OLP30 Volume 3
"—" denotes a release that did not chart. "×" denotes periods where charts did not exist or were not archived.

== Other appearances ==
The following songs are non-album tracks released by the band

- "The Needle and the Damage Done" from Borrowed Tunes: A Tribute to Neil Young (1994)
- "Tomorrow Never Knows" from The Craft: Music from the Motion Picture (1996)
- "Starseed" (remix) from Armageddon: The Album (1998)
- "Whatever" from WWF Forceable Entry (2002)
- "Fight the Good Fight" from Occupy This Album (2012)

== Music videos ==
Year	Title	Director
1992	"Out of Here"	Sam Siciliano
1994	"The Birdman"	Floria Sigismondi
1994	"Starseed"	George Vale
1994	"Hope"	
1995	"Naveed"	George Vale
1997	"Superman's Dead"	Ken Fox
1997	"Clumsy"	Matt Mahurin
1997	"Automatic Flowers"	Our Lady Peace
1997	"4 A.M."	Tony Pantages
1999	"One Man Army"	Mark Kohr
1999	"Is Anybody Home?"	Giuseppe Capotondi
2000	"Thief"	Micha Dahan
2000	"In Repair"	Oli Goldsmith
2001	"Life"	Marcos Siega
2002	"Somewhere Out There"	Eric Heimbold
2002	"Innocent"	Tryan George
2005	"Where Are You?"	Scott Weintrob
2005	"Angels/Losing/Sleep"	Scott Weintrob
2006	"Will the Future Blame Us?"	
2008	"Right Behind You (Mafia)"	Oli Goldsmith
2009	"The Right Stuff"	Teqtonik
2009	"All You Did Was Save My Life"	Scott Weintrob
2009	"The End Is Where We Begin"	Scott Weintrob
2010	"Dreamland"	Rich Misener
2012	"Heavyweight"	Christopher Mills
2012	"As Fast as You Can"	Michael Maxxis
2013	"Rabbits"	CutCartel
2014	"Won't Turn Back"	Marc Webb
2017	"Drop Me in the Water"	Iva Golubovic & Kelly Fyffe-Marshall
2017	"Hiding Place for Hearts"	Iva Golubovic & Kelly Fyffe-Marshall
2017	"Nice to Meet You"	Iva Golubovic & Kelly Fyffe-Marshall
2018	"Falling Into Place"	Iva Golubovic & Kelly Fyffe-Marshall
2021	"Stop Making Stupid People Famous" (ft. Pussy Riot)	Michael Maxxis
2022	"Run"	Odin Wadleigh
2024	"Sound the Alarm"	Michael Kessler
2025	"No Angels In This Town"	Michael Kessler

== Notes ==
- A. "Superman's Dead" and "Clumsy" peaked on the US Radio Songs chart.
