= Curve (album) =

Studio album by Our Lady Peace
- Released: April 3, 2012
- Recorded: January 2010–February 2012
- Studio: Los Angeles, California, US
- Genre: Alternative rock; art rock
- Length: 41:39
- Label: Warner Music
- Producer: Jason Lader; Raine Maida

Our Lady Peace chronology
Burn Burn (2009)	Curve (2012)	Somethingness (2018)

Singles from Curve
- 1. "Heavyweight" Released: December 20, 2011

Curve is the eighth studio album by Canadian alternative rock band Our Lady Peace (OLP), released on April 3, 2012. The album was recorded from 2010 through 2012 at vocalist Raine Maida's home recording studio. Curve's first and only single, "Heavyweight", was released on December 20, 2011. The music from Curve has been touted by lead singer Maida as being "more experimental and ambitious" than the band's 2000 concept album Spiritual Machines. The album's cover features Canadian heavyweight boxer George Chuvalo, whose vocal excerpts are featured in the album's tenth and final track "Mettle".

The album debuted at No. 9 on the Canadian Albums Chart. This is the last album to feature the Gravity-era lineup, with drummer Jeremy Taggart leaving the band in June 2014. The time between Curve's release and the band's 2018 album Somethingness marked the longest gap between Our Lady Peace studio albums to date, at nearly 6 years.

== Development ==
The band began recording Curve about six months after the release of their seventh studio album, Burn Burn. As with Burn Burn, the album was recorded at Raine Maida's studio in Los Angeles and is not attached to a major record label. Fans were provided with unprecedented live footage of the band recording the album via Ustream throughout early to mid-2011. Band members also provided live updates on the progress of the album, including song titles and lyrics, via Twitter and Facebook.

=== Artistic direction ===
Curve's artistic direction was inspired by the band's 2010 Clumsy and Spiritual Machines tour, as well as by constructive criticism from a friend of the band's, Jason Lader, who later became producer of the album. When Lader was shown some early working material from the album, he criticized it, saying "why don't you make a record that you would listen to?". This prompted the band to scrap all of the material they'd written and recorded up to that point, and to start over fresh.

The band has stated that they pushed the creative boundaries as much as possible with Curve's music. In a late 2011 interview, lead singer Maida was quoted as saying, "when we look back at what we respect about what we've done, whether it's things from Naveed or things from Spiritual Machines, it's tapping into those feelings and trying to find that place again where we exist as artists, and the record really goes deep into those spaces, so it's getting back to what I think the best parts of this band are." He added, "I think people are gonna be pretty surprised where this record goes".

== Critical reception ==
Professional ratings
Aggregate scores
Source	Rating
Metacritic	49/100
Review scores
Source	Rating
AllMusic	2.5/5 stars
Consequence of Sound	D−
Pop Matters	5/10 stars
Now	3/5 stars
AbsolutePunk	7.8 stars on a 10 point scale
Melodic	4/5 stars

At Metacritic, which assigns a normalised rating out of 100 to reviews from mainstream critics, the album received an average score of 49 (based on four reviews) indicating the reception of the album has been 'mixed'.

== Track listing ==
The official track list was revealed through Curve's entry on Amazon.com in March 2012.

No.	Title	Notes	Length
1.	"Allowance"		3:34
2.	"Fire in the Hen House"		3:29
3.	"Heavyweight"	First single	4:15
4.	"Window Seat"		4:16
5.	"As Fast As You Can"	Music video released for the song	3:11
6.	"If This Is It"		4:50
7.	"Will Someday Change"		3:43
8.	"Find Our Way"		4:49
9.	"Rabbits"		5:33
10.	"Mettle"	Features vocal excerpts from boxer George Chuvalo	3:52
