= Clumsy =

Clumsy or clumsiness may refer to:

== Behaviour ==
- Accident-proneness
- Developmental coordination disorder, a motor skills disorder which brings about chronic clumsiness

== Music ==
- Clumsy (Our Lady Peace album), 1997
  - "Clumsy" (Our Lady Peace song)
- Clumsy (Samiam album), 1994
- "Clumsy" (Fergie song), 2007
- "Clumsy" (Britney Spears song), 2016
- "Clumsy", a song by All Time Low from Wake Up, Sunshine, 2020

== Literature ==
- Clumsy, a 2002 graphic novel by Jeffrey Brown
