= Let Them Have Their Fun =

Studio album by Alert the Medic
- Released: September 8, 2017
- Recorded: 2017
- Studio: Revolution Recording and The Pocket Studios, Toronto, Ontario
- Genre: Rock
- Length: 38:13
- Label: Fontana North and Cadence Music Group
- Producer: Mike Turner

Singles from Alert the Medic
- 1. "Corporate Kid"

Let Them Have Their Fun is the fourth full-length release by Canadian rock band Alert the Medic. The album was produced and mixed by Mike Turner (musician), engineered by Phil Hotz with additional engineering by Turner. Let Them Have Their Fun was recorded in Toronto, Ontario, Canada at Revolution Recording with additional tracking done at The Pocket Studios in February 2017 and was mastered by Harry Hess at H-Bomb Mastering in Toronto. It was released through Fontana North and Cadence Music Group on September 8, 2017.

The lead-off single Corporate Kid peaked at No. 17 on the Canadian Active Rock charts

== Track listing ==
1. "What Are The Odds?" – 4:25
2. "Our Finest Hour" – 3:23
3. "Allan Park" – 3:53
4. "Farewell, For Now" – 3:49
5. "Corporate Kid" – 4:00
6. "Young Love" – 3:29
7. "Lonely" – 3:33
8. "Music In The Background" – 3:25
9. "Heart Of Hearts" – 3:18
10. "NorCal" – 4:52

== Personnel ==
- Ryan MacDonald – Vocals, guitar, keyboard
- Matt Campbell – Bass guitar
- Dale Wilson – Drums, percussion
- Troy Arseneault – Guitar

Additional Musicians

- Kyle Varley – Organ, Piano
- Gene Hardy – Tenor and Baritone Sax on "What Are The Odds?"
- William Sperandei – Trumpet on "What Are The Odds?"

Art

- Alert The Medic – Artwork and Concept

Production

- Produced and Engineered by Mike Turner
- Revolution sessions Engineered by Phil Hotz
- Revolution Assistant Engineer: Andrew Doidge
- Mixed by Mike Turner and Alert The Medic
- Mastered by Harry Hess at HBomb Mastering
- Horns on "What Are The Odds?" recorded at Exeter Sound Studios by Thomas McKay
