= MuchMusic Video Award for Peoples Choice: Favourite Canadian Group =

The MuchMusic Video Award for Peoples Choice: Favourite Canadian Group is an award presented at the MuchMusic Video Awards, given to a Canadian duo or group.

== Winners ==
| Year | Artist | Video |
|---|---|---|
| 1990 | Jeff Healey Band | "Angel Eyes" |
| 1991 | The Grapes of Wrath | "I Am Here" |
| 1992 | Barenaked Ladies | "Lovers In A Dangerous Time" |
| 1993 | Barenaked Ladies | "Brian Wilson" |
| 1994 | N/A | N/A |
| 1995 | Moist | "Believe Me" |
| 1996 | I Mother Earth | "One More Astronaut" |
| 1997 | Our Lady Peace | "Superman's Dead" |
| 1998 | Our Lady Peace | "4 A.M." |
| 1999 | The Moffatts | "Miss You Like Crazy" |
| 2000 | Our Lady Peace | "One Man Army" |
| 2001 | Sum 41 | "Makes No Difference" |
| 2002 | Sum 41 | “In Too Deep” |
| 2003 | Simple Plan | "Addicted" |
| 2004 | Simple Plan | "Perfect" |
| 2005 | Simple Plan | "Welcome To My Life" |
| 2006 | Simple Plan | "Crazy" |
| 2007 | Billy Talent | "Devil In A Midnight Mass" |
| 2008 | Simple Plan | "When I'm Gone" |
