= Burn Burn (album) =

Studio album by Our Lady Peace
- Released: July 21, 2009
- Recorded: February 2007 – June 2009; Los Angeles
- Genre: Alternative rock
- Length: 38:03; 44:54 (Deluxe edition)
- Label: Coalition Entertainment
- Producer: Raine Maida

Our Lady Peace chronology
| The Very Best of Our Lady Peace (2009) | Burn Burn (2009) | Curve (2012) |

Singles from Burn Burn
- 1. "All You Did Was Save My Life" Released: May 25, 2009; 2. "The End is Where We Begin" Released: September 14, 2009

Burn Burn is the seventh studio album by Canadian alternative rock band Our Lady Peace, released in North America on July 21, 2009. The album's title is based on a quote by Jack Kerouac from his 1957 novel On the Road.

The album, recorded at vocalist Raine Maida's home studio in Los Angeles between 2007 and 2009, was released independent of any major label under the band's longtime management company Coalition Entertainment. Sony Music (the band's previous label) distributed the album in Canada, and WMG's Independent Label Group did so in the United States.

Burn Burn is Our Lady Peace's first album not to have involved collaboration with an outside producer, having instead been produced by band vocalist Raine Maida.

== Album history ==
"It took us six other records to figure out how we truly wanted to make records."

— Raine Maida in a Metro Canada interview

Production on Burn Burn began in February 2007, several months before the release of bandleader Raine Maida's solo album The Hunters Lullaby. According to Maida, Burn Burn is a "proper rock album"—featuring a return to the raw originality of the band's first album Naveed, though a "little more mature".

Maida produced the album himself, noting how he was excited to "not have anybody intrude on sessions". The band had previously worked with producer Bob Rock for their two preceding albums, as well as Arnold Lanni for their first four albums.

Having been defunct since 2007, the official Our Lady Peace fansite was relaunched on March 11, 2009 in anticipation of Burn Burn. The album's original cover was revealed with the relaunch, and on May 1 was officially changed to portray a darker and more simplistic tone than the original.

Burn Burn finished production in early March 2009, and the first single "All You Did Was Save My Life" was released on May 25. The album, as well as a deluxe edition entitled Burn Burn Burn, was released in North America on July 21, 2009. Burn Burn debuted at #3 on the Canadian Albums Chart, selling over 11,000 copies in its first week.

== Critical reception ==
Professional ratings
Aggregate scores
| Source | Rating |
|---|---|
| Metacritic | 65/100 |
Review scores
| Source | Rating |
| Allmusic | 2.5/5 stars |
| Alternative Addiction | 4/5 stars |
| Billboard | 3.5/5 stars |
| Boston Globe | (positive) |
| Chartattack | 2/5 stars |
| Melodic.net | 4.5/5 stars |
| PopMatters | 7/10 stars |
| Sputnikmusic | 4/5 stars |

Burn Burn received generally favourable reviews, with PopMatters calling it "their most intimate, immediate album to date". Allmusic compared the album's sound to latter-day Goo-Goo Dolls and 1980s U2, but also noted that the album "remain(s) deficient in hooks and melodies", and that the music "simmered" instead of having "boiled with indignation" as it did in the band's previous albums.

Billboard praised the seventh track "Never Get Over You" as a "killer ballad", but ultimately criticized the album for being too "ballad-heavy" and "one dimensional".Burn Burn doesn't particularly sound like anything Our Lady Peace has done in the past, according to Sputnikmusic, but "maybe that is what is so exciting about (it)".

== Charts ==
| Chart (2009) | Peak position |
|---|---|
| Canadian Albums Chart | 3 |
| U.S. Billboard 200 | 41 |

== Songs ==
The album contains 10 tracks of the 16 that were composed—and is approximately 38 minutes in length. Lyrics were mostly written by Raine Maida, and the first track was co-written by Maida and former The Nixons vocalist Zac Maloy.

The official track listing for Burn Burn was released in May 2009, but was altered in early June to replace the track "The Right Stuff" with "The End is Where We Begin". Sequencing of remaining tracks was also affected by the change. A Deluxe Edition of the album was also released, retitled Burn Burn Burn, with bonus tracks "The Right Stuff" and "Time Bomb" included, as well as a bonus DVD with studio performance footage and music videos for All You Did Was Save My Life and bonus track The Right Stuff.

=== Single chronology ===
- In April 2009, the music video for Burn Burn's first single, "All You Did Was Save My Life", was filmed in an undisclosed wooded area near Ancaster, Canada. The video features Canadian actress Shenae Grimes, of Degrassi: The Next Generation and 90210 fame; and model Ronnie Flynn of Courtice, ON. The video was leaked prematurely to Canadian viewers through MSN's website on May 22, and was officially unveiled on the May 25 episode of MuchMusic's Much On Demand. The audio track was released to radio stations and iTunes on May 25 in Canada, and was released on June 9 in the United States.
- Burn Burn's second single, "The End is Where We Begin," was officially released on September 14 in Canada.

=== Track listing ===
| No. | Title | Notes | Length |
|---|---|---|---|
| 1. | "All You Did Was Save My Life" | First released single | 3:49 |
| 2. | "Dreamland" | Third single | 3:36 |
| 3. | "Monkey Brains" | | 4:31 |
| 4. | "The End Is Where We Begin" | Second single | 3:23 |
| 5. | "Escape Artist" | Original title of the album was this song's title | 4:02 |
| 6. | "Refuge" | | 4:16 |
| 7. | "Never Get Over You" | The title of the album originates from a lyric in this song | 3:57 |
| 8. | "White Flags" | | 3:18 |
| 9. | "Signs of Life" | | 3:14 |
| 10. | "Paper Moon" | | 3:57 |

==== Bonus tracks (from "Deluxe edition") ====
| No. | Title | Notes | Length |
|---|---|---|---|
| 11. | "Time Bomb" | formerly titled "Waiting for Something to Happen" | 3:31 |
| 12. | "The Right Stuff" | | 3:24 |

== Personnel ==
=== Our Lady Peace ===
- Raine Maida – lead vocals
- Steve Mazur – guitar; piano, percussion, backing vocals
- Duncan Coutts – bass; backing vocals
- Jeremy Taggart – drums; percussion, backing vocals

=== Additional personnel ===
- Eladio Reyes – backing vocals on "Signs of Life"
- Dusty Schaller – assistant engineer, digital editing
- Paul Hager – mixing on "All You Did Was Save My Life", "Dreamland", "Never Get Over You", and "The End Is Where We Begin"
- Andrew Scheps – mixing
- Eric Lawrence – management
- Rob Lanni – management
- End Creative – layout, web design
- Richard Misener – layout
- Bob Boyd – mastering
- Lorne Sprackman – business management
- Our Lady Peace – art direction and concept
- Dustin Rabin – photography
- S.L. Feldman & Associates – Canada booking
- Helter Skelter Agency Limited – Asia, Europe, South America, and UK booking
- Paradigm – USA booking
