= The End Is Where We Begin =

The End Is Where We Begin may refer to:

- The End Is Where We Begin (album), an album by Thousand Foot Krutch, or its title song
- "The End Is Where We Begin" (song), a song by Our Lady Peace
