= All You Did Was Save My Life =

Single by Our Lady Peace

from the album Burn Burn
- Released: May 25, 2009
- Recorded: 2009
- Genre: Alternative rock
- Length: 3:48
- Label: Coalition Entertainment
- Songwriters: Raine Maida, Zac Maloy
- Producer: Raine Maida

Our Lady Peace singles chronology
"Kiss On The Mouth" (2006)	"All You Did Was Save My Life" (2009)	"The End Is Where We Begin" (2009)

Music video
- "All You Did Was Save My Life" on YouTube

"All You Did Was Save My Life" is the first single from Our Lady Peace's seventh studio album Burn Burn. The single was released in Canada on May 25, 2009, and in the US on June 9, 2009.

== Music video ==
The music video, directed by Scott Weintrob was shot in Ancaster, a community in Hamilton, Ontario, Canada and was released on May 24. Actress Shenae Grimes made an appearance in the video alongside fellow Canadian, model Ronnie Flynn.

== Charts ==
=== Weekly charts ===
Chart (2009)	Peak position
Canadian Hot 100	12
U.S. Alternative Songs	36

=== Year-end charts ===
Chart (2009)	Position
Canadian Hot 100	90
