= The Phantom Moves =

Studio album by Alert the Medic
- Released: May 3, 2014
- Recorded: 2014
- Studio: The Pocket Studios
- Genre: Rock
- Length: 46:56
- Label: Independent
- Producer: Mike Turner

Singles from Alert the Medic
- 1. "Echo and Fade"; 2. "All Better Now"; 3. "Hanna and the Ocean"

The Phantom Moves is the third full-length release by Canadian rock band Alert the Medic. The album was produced, recorded and mixed by Mike Turner (musician). The Phantom Moves was recorded in Toronto, Canada at The Pocket Studios in February and March 2014 and was mastered by Harry Hess at H-Bomb Mastering in Toronto. It was released independently on May 3, 2014.

The lead-off single Echo And Fade peaked at No. 20 on the Canadian Active Rock charts and was used for the Plays of the Year at the 2014 NHL Awards.

== Track listing ==
1. "(Waiting In The Wings)" – 2:02
2. "Cut, Copy, Paste" – 4:20
3. "Hanna And The Ocean" – 2:59
4. "This Is Our Time" – 3:52
5. "Delicate Love" – 3:34
6. "Hands That Held Me Back" – 4:07
7. "All Better Now" – 2:34
8. "Echo And Fade" – 3:43
9. "Wonderful" – 3:03
10. "We Are The Ones To Blame" – 4:34
11. "Loup-Garou" – 3:04
12. "Grace, Come Back" – 4:24
13. "Lady In The Water" – 4:33

== Personnel ==
- Ryan MacDonald – Vocals, guitar, keyboard
- Matt Campbell – Bass guitar, vocals
- Dale Wilson – Drums, percussion, vocals
- Troy Arseneault – Guitar, vocals

with

- Derek Giberson – Keyboard on Tracks 4, 6, 10, 13

Art

- David Collier – Artwork
- Mike MacDougall – Digital Layout
