= Alert the Medic =

Canadian rock band

Alert The Medic
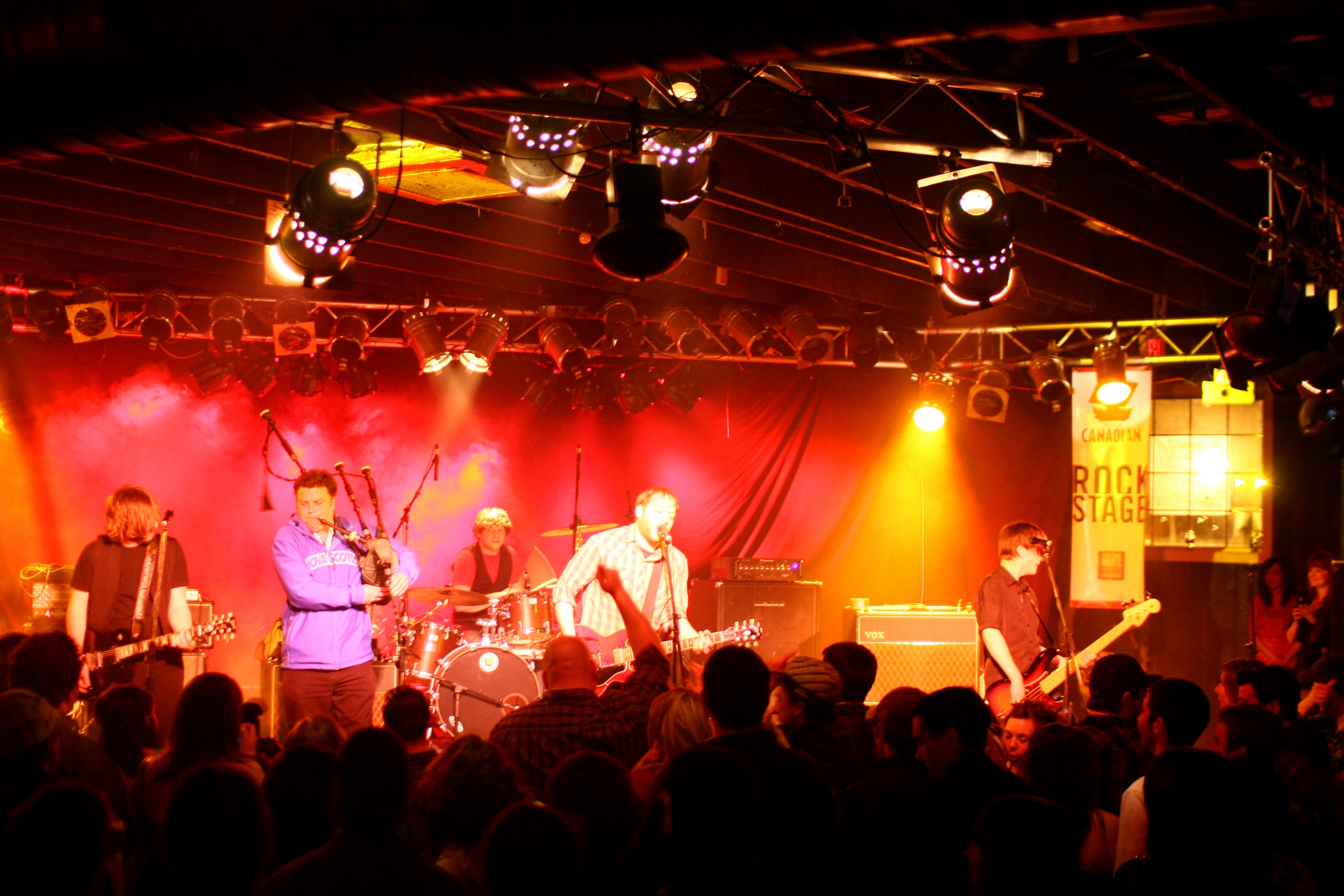
- Alert the Medic in 2010

Background information
- Origin: Halifax, Nova Scotia, Canada
- Genre: Rock
- Years active: 2006–present
- Members: Ryan MacDonald; Matt Campbell; Dale Wilson; Troy Arseneault
- Past members: Jonathan MacDougall; Jon Landry
- Website: alertthemedic.com

Alert the Medic is an independent Canadian rock band formed in 2006 and based in Halifax, Nova Scotia. The group consists of vocalist and guitarist Ryan MacDonald, bassist Matt Campbell, guitarist Troy Arseneault, and drummer Dale Wilson. Their fourth album Let Them Have Their Fun was released through Cadence Music Group and Fontana North on September 8, 2017.

== History ==
Alert the Medic's was formed by Ryan MacDonald, Jonathan MacDougall, Matt Campbell and Dale Wilson, who grew up together in and around Stellarton, Nova Scotia. They released their first full-length album, Alert the Medic, in 2006. It was co-produced and engineered by Laurence Currie.

In late 2007, MacDougall left the band and the position was temporarily filled by Jon Landry of The Stanfields until the band found current guitarist Troy Arseneault in early 2008.

The now Halifax-based rock group had an impressive year in 2008, receiving two East Coast Music Award nominations—for Rising Star Recording of the Year and Rock Recording of the Year. In September, the band was part of the d250 Rollercoaster University tour in Nova Scotia featuring illScarlett, and opened for Canadian rock band Our Lady Peace at the Centre 200 in Sydney, Nova Scotia.

In March 2009, Alert the Medic traveled to Toronto to record their second album We, the Weapon, once again working with Laurence Currie. The album was recorded at Hallamusic, Green Door Studios and The Echo Chamber and was independently released in September 2009. Rob Crowell of Deer Tick appears on the album. Rob Bezanson, keyboardist for Crash Parallel joined the band for two Toronto shows during the bands We, the Weapon release tour, for which the band produced a life-on-the-road video.

Alert the Medic received two 2010 East Coast Music Award nominations, for Rock Recording of the Year and Single of the Year for We, the Weapon's debut single "Atlas", and were nominated for Fan's Choice Entertainer of the Year in 2011.

The third single from the album, "The Weatherman (Pt. 2)", was featured on Season 4, Episode 6 of the ABC and Global TV show Rookie Blue on July 25, 2013.

In November 2012 the band returned to the studio to begin pre-production work with founding Our Lady Peace member and current Crash Karma guitarist Mike Turner at The Pocket Studios. The band would continue demo and pre-production work with Turner throughout 2013 and in February 2014 before recording their third album, The Phantom Moves. The album was released on May 3, 2014.

The band began promotion of the new record during the spring of 2013, appearing on the Marilyn Denis Show, and filming a YouTube video with former WWE wrestler Rick Martel.

Tracks from The Phantom Moves also appeared on the 2014 NHL Awards, CFL.ca, NHL.com and Roger's Sportsnet during the entire 2014 post-season and World Series coverage. The album led to the band signing a distribution deal with Fontana North and received two Music Nova Scotia award nominations for Group Recording of the Year and Rock Recording of the Year.

In 2016, Alert The Medic began pre-production for their fourth album Let Them Have Their Fun. The album was produced and mixed by Mike Turner (musician), and engineered by Phil Hotz. Let Them Have Their Fun was recorded in Toronto at Revolution Recording with additional tracking done at The Pocket Studios in February 2017. It was released through Fontana North and Cadence Music Group on September 8, 2017. The band released a promotional video for the Let Them Have Their Fun tour.

Band members

- Ryan MacDonald – vocals, guitar (2006–present)
- Matt Campbell – bass (2006–present)
- Dale Wilson – drums (2006–present)
- Troy Arseneault – guitar (2008–present)
- Jonathan MacDougall – guitar (2006–2007)
- Jon Landry – guitar (2007–2008)

== Discography ==
Year	Album
2006	Alert the Medic
2009	We, the Weapon
2014	The Phantom Moves
2017	Let Them Have Their Fun

=== Singles ===
Year	Song	Chart Positions		Album
Year	Song	CAN Rock	CAN Alt	Album
2009	"Atlas"	45	–	We, the Weapon
2010	"Aid The Getaway"	49	–	We, the Weapon
2010	"The Weatherman (Pt.2)"	–	–	We, the Weapon
2012	"Hey Kid, To The Back Of The Line"	53	–	We, the Weapon
2014	"Echo And Fade"	20	30	The Phantom Moves
2014	"All Better Now"	34	40	The Phantom Moves
2015	"Hanna And The Ocean"	31	32	The Phantom Moves
2017	"Corporate Kid"	17	–	Let Them Have Their Fun
2017	"Music In The Background"	49	–	Let Them Have Their Fun
2018	"Heart Of Hearts"	–	47	Let Them Have Their Fun
