= Spiritual Machines =

Studio album by Our Lady Peace
- Released: December 12, 2000
- Recorded: August–October 2000
- Studios: Arnyard, Toronto; Avatar (New York, New York); Atlanta, Georgia (mixing)
- Genres: Alternative rock; art rock; post-grunge
- Length: 57:10
- Label: Columbia
- Producers: Arnold Lanni, Raine Maida, Brendan O'Brien

Our Lady Peace chronology
Happiness... Is Not a Fish That You Can Catch (1999)	Spiritual Machines (2000)	Gravity (2002)

Singles from Spiritual Machines
- 1. "In Repair" Released: November 15, 2000; 2. "Life" Released: December 20, 2000; 3. "Right Behind You (Mafia)" Released: July 2, 2001

Spiritual Machines is the fourth studio album by the Canadian alternative rock band Our Lady Peace, released by Columbia Records in December 2000. Although not initially intended, the project evolved into a conceptual interpretation of futurist and inventor Raymond Kurzweil's 1999 book The Age of Spiritual Machines. Short tracks of spoken dialog from Kurzweil himself are interspersed among the actual songs on the album. The Kurzweil K250 keyboard, one of his inventions, was utilized throughout the recording of the album.

The album was written and recorded in two months while the band was still on tour in support of their previous record, Happiness... Is Not a Fish That You Can Catch, which had only been released 14 months prior. A combination of lead singer-songwriter Raine Maida's prolific songwriting at the time and lead-guitarist Mike Turner's discovery of The Age of Spiritual Machines in a bookstore hurried the completion of the album. The band only took a break from recording to organize and perform at Summersault in 2000. Unlike their previous releases, this one features a more organic, acoustic sound, and less obvious layering and electronic texturing.

Spiritual Machines has been noted as being the end of an era for Our Lady Peace, as it was the last album produced by the band's longtime producer Arnold Lanni, the last to feature original guitarist Mike Turner in full, and the last studio album to feature art model Saul Fox (until 2021) on its cover. It was also the last album to feature Maida's high-falsetto singing voice prominently. The album peaked at number five in Canada, where it is certified double platinum.

In August 2020, the band announced that they would be releasing a direct sequel to the album, titled Spiritual Machines 2, which was released in 2021.

== Background ==
While touring rigorously in support of Happiness... in mid-2000, Mike Turner came across The Age of Spiritual Machines, a 1999 book by inventor and futurist Ray Kurzweil. "I happened to be lucky enough to discover a really shiny book cover in a book store." Turner stated, "I wish I could say it was like, 'Well, I've been on this intellectual quest.' I picked it up, read it and went mental." Becoming fascinated by the futuristic ideology of the book, he proceeded to share it with the other band members, reading them passages on their tour bus over the next several months.

Lead singer Raine Maida first brought up the idea of a concept album after excerpts from the book began influencing his songwriting. Passing time on the road, he had amassed a backlog of songs and had begun to record demos. He jokingly suggested an album title of Kurzweil. "That was not the most graceful sounding name in the world, so we went with Spiritual Machines instead," Turner said. While the other band-members were less enthusiastic about the idea due to its weighty subject matter, Maida and Turner decided to pursue it and Turner contacted Ray Kurzweil via email to ask for permission to use the title of his book for their project. Kurzweil's excitement at the prospect prompted them to invite him to record spoken excerpts from his book for the album and a correspondence developed. “I think it’s amazing that Ray Kurzweil sent us a bunch of pieces, and for whatever reason, they really tie in with what we were trying to say on this record,” said Maida.

== Recording and production ==
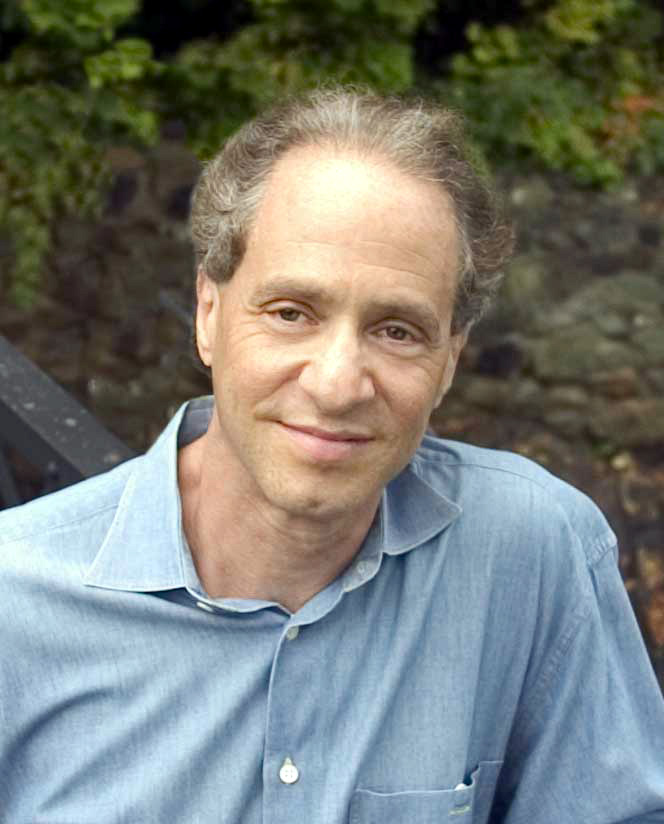
Select The Age of Spiritual Machines excerpts voiced by author Ray Kurzweil were incorporated into the album.

Unlike the band's three previous albums, most of the songs on Spiritual Machines were written solely by Maida. “I think that because this record happened quickly, we just ended up using a lot more of my songs this time,” stated Maida. “Whatever happens, happens, and if there are good ideas lying around, we use them.” Also unlike on their previous albums, this one was recorded sporadically piece by piece with songs being added as others were discarded. Raine had made several vocal demos at his new home recording studio before the Spiritual Machines idea had come into play. Many of these demos were used for the final recordings and Raine was given production credits. “It was more a means to an end." he explained, "I would start off with a 4-track, then move to an 8-track, then go to digital. I have a ProTools system set up in my basement, so I just try to finish songs and get them out of the way so I don’t build up this backlog of ideas. We just sift through that stuff, as well as the stuff we do in rehearsal and just pick the best ideas and go. It wasn't like I said I wanted to be a producer or anything, it’s just that the demos I was making came closer to the finished product on one or two occasions, so now, I’m a producer.”

Jamie Edwards, who had helped record and tour for Happiness... was heavily utilized during the recording process and was becoming a big part of the band, considered by some to be the unofficial fifth member of the band at that time. Taggart recounted in 2010, "He’s an amazing guitar player, and he played on the record. People don’t know that he had a lot to do with that stuff. He was very influential. We had him in all our writing sessions. It was a very creative time that was cool because we were all in a room, kind of working together.”

By the time the band was set to perform at Summersault in August 2000, about eight songs, including "Life" and "Everyone's a Junkie", had been recorded as demos while the band was on the road touring. Guitarist Turner noted: "After we were done we brought them in for the record company to hear, with an eye to making plans for next year. They heard what we were doing and said, 'Well, let's finish the album you're working on.' And we thought, 'Album? We're just demoing.' But they told us what we had was great, so we went back into the studio with Arn[old Lanni] and did just that." Over the next two months, the band worked to complete the album with Arnold Lanni at Arnyard Studios in Toronto as well as Avatar Studios in New York City. Rumors had surfaced that, while in New York, Our Lady peace had dropped Lanni as producer to work with The Smashing Pumpkins frontman Billy Corgan. These rumors were later debunked by Maida. The first songs to be played live were "Life" and "Everyone's a Junkie", which debuted during Summersault in August 2000 shortly after they were first recorded. In an August 2000 interview with Chartattack Raine revealed that a song titled "Yesterday" (later to become "Middle of Yesterday") was almost guaranteed to be the first single for Spiritual Machines.

He’s worked with all these huge artists we respect, so we just let him do his thing. The only thing we tried to do in the studio, was to keep it live and not overdo parts, and I think he exemplified it even more. For him, it wasn't about trying to hear every little part, it’s just about putting it all together and making it feel like there is a live band and it has an energy, and he’s really fucking good at that.

— Raine Maida, on mixing with Brendan O'Brien

Towards the end of recording Spiritual Machines, percussionist Jeremy Taggart suffered a serious ankle injury during a mugging while walking his dog. While he recovered, Taggart's friend Matt Cameron, former drummer for Soundgarden and Pearl Jam, filled in for Taggart on the tracks "Right Behind You (Mafia)" and "Are You Sad?", which Taggart had already written the drum parts for. When the final tracks were ready for mixing, the band shopped around before finding a producer they wanted. The album was mixed in Atlanta, Georgia by Brendan O'Brien, Pearl Jam's long time producer. "It was an amazing experience working with Brendan, someone who immediately understood what we were trying to do and was able to capture exactly how we heard this album," noted Maida.

== Music and lyrics ==
The songs for Spiritual Machines were written and partially recorded during a year in which the band was doing extensive touring of Canada, the United States, and Europe. According to lead singer Maida, the live stage-context inspired the band to "keep it really basic and not try to add too many textures... to not overdo it." and giving the technically inclined record an acoustic feel at times. According to Maida, half of the record was completed before the book and its ideas even entered the equation. During an interview in late 2001, he stated, "... even though it seems quite intrinsic to the record, really, it only represents about four or five songs." While the lyrics of several songs were inspired by the futuristic theories of Kurzweil, they were also written as a response to them, saying that the human spirit would always prevail. "Lyrically, this album is about finding the spirituality within ourselves." This is the case with the opening song, "Right Behind You (Mafia)", which Raine said, "..[is] not an 'f-you' to Kurzweil. It's like 'I believe [much of] what you're saying, but we're going to fight it as well because there is a soul and there is a spirit.'" Following "Mafia" is the song "In Repair", which muses on how the human body can be "repaired," whether through heart surgery or after an accident. This song is countered by the following track, "Life" which, explained Maida, "recognizes the pain our minds can experience."

During a 2001 interview with Gary Graff from Wall of Sound Magazine, Maida recounted the inspiration for the lyrics of "Are You Sad". He was in New York recording "In Repair" at the old Hit Factory studio, which was later known as Avatar Studios. Following those sessions, Maida attempted to call his younger brother from his hotel room but couldn't get through. "When you're making a record, you kind of go into hiding, especially when I'm writing lyrics or writing music; I tend not to keep in touch with any friends or family or stuff. But my brother and I have a good relationship, and I want to keep it good. I couldn't get a hold of him for, like, a week, and I knew he was going through a shitty time — typical young-20s, no job, having a tough life. I wanted to talk to him desperately, and this song just came out of me, "Are You Sad?" It came out really quickly on a shitty travel guitar". The meaning of "If You Believe" was revealed in a 2001 interview with Cleveland.com, "That song's about having an out-of-body experience and seeing that the afterlife is real," Maida confirms, "and telling people that there's something machines can't have, and we've got it.

Spiritual Machines concludes with the track "The Wonderful Future", which is one of the songs on the album that features minimal instrumentation. Raine explained that the song embraces the outcome of Kurzweil's future and accepts it as something new and exciting. It is about a woman who builds her "own satellite from an old rusted chair" who will one day realize that a man of flesh and tears can satisfy her future. "That's one of my favourite songs, for that reason," said Maida. "That song's about building the perfect human – this cyber-human – and realizing that you can't really compete." Following several minutes of silence after "The Wonderful Future", there is a hidden track with Ray Kurzweil communicating with 'Molly'. Molly is a robot from 2099, who at the beginning of the book was a 23-year-old woman who knew nothing about what Kurzweil was trying to explain, and then started to evolve in the way Kurzweil predicted.

In a March 2010 interview with The Montreal Gazette, Maida looked back fondly on the making of the album and while saying it took a while to get it right both musically and lyrically, he said "I appreciate the work I did lyrically; it does all tie together. As I sing these songs, it has that feeling of fixing things, and kind of where Ray was going in terms of being able to fix anything and possibly living beyond the realm of any human being and whatever anyone could think of a human living."

== Release ==
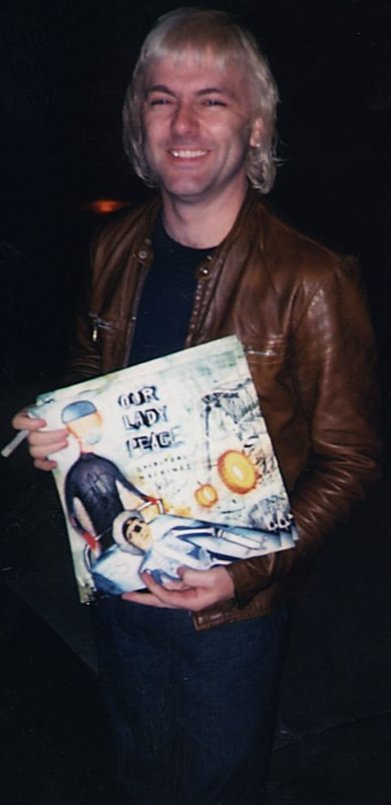
Guitarist Mike Turner posing with Spiritual Machines artwork

=== Promotion ===
Following a virtual listening party on the band's website where the full ten songs from the record were made available to listen to, Spiritual Machines was released in Canada on December 12, 2000. For those who pre-ordered the album, a limited-edition version of the CD was released in a black jewel case in which the artwork was not visible, only the band's name and logo in embossed lettering. Spiritual Machines sold 36,394 copies in its debut week, and would sell a total of 100,000 units in the first month after its release, making it their fastest selling album to date. It went on to be certified 2× Platinum in Canada. As was common practice, the album was released several months later in the United States on March 13, 2001. Upon release in the United States, it spent a total of four weeks on the Billboard 200 charts, peaking at number 81. In the United States, the album has yet to be certified by the RIAA. It was released to Asian and European markets on May 9, 2001, under the Epic Records label. The record was re-released in 2008 under the Sony's Special Markets division.

The lead off single for Spiritual Machines was "In Repair". It was only promoted in Canada and though reaching number one on the Canadian Rock Radio charts, quickly fell off the charts shortly after its November 15, 2000 release. While the single was a failure in the United States, the music video, directed by Oli Goldsmith won multiple awards at the MuchMusic Video Awards including Best Video and Best Director. The second single was "Life", released shortly after the album's Canadian release in December 2000. It was the only single that was commercially released, in Australia (EPK 6718742). It fared better on the charts, reaching number 27 on the U.S. Modern Rock Tracks chart on March 10, 2001, after 13 weeks. In Canada, the song peaked at number two on the Canadian Rock Radio charts while the music video eventually reached number one on the MuchMusic Countdown. The third and final single was "Right Behind You (Mafia)". By this time, Spiritual Machines was proving itself to be commercial failure in the States. The release of the single, set to be in June 2001, was aborted and the promotional copies were instead distributed to the band's fan club. The Oli Goldsmith directed music video's release was also cancelled and the video had not been seen until it was released on the band's official website in 2009.

=== Packaging ===
The band contacted local Toronto artist Oli Goldsmith who happened to be reading the same book, to create the artwork for the upcoming album. In total, he made around 200 paintings relating to the project, many of which were used for the album art, promotional singles and the band's website. Based on the success of that commission, the record label asked him to also create and direct music videos for the singles "In Repair" and "Right Behind You (Mafia)", which took his paintings and brought them to life with animation and stylized live motion. His artwork was described as "Integrating photographs, logos, television images, signs, as well as a variety of written forms, such as epigrams and poetry, Goldsmith's art juxtaposes the unexpected, resulting in pieces that are bold, colourful, and energetic." When the album insert is unfolded, it reveals a surrealistic panorama that appears to be set in a hospital. The official photo shoot for Spiritual Machines took place on October 7, 2000, on the sixth floor of St. Joseph's Health Centre in Toronto, formerly an intensive-care unit.

Professional ratings
Review scores
Source	Rating
Allmusic	4/5 stars
Entertainment Weekly	B−
The Hamilton Spectator	(favorable)
Jam!	(favorable)
Kerrang!	4/5 stars
The Michigan Daily	(B)
PopMatters	(favorable)
Pulse!	2/5 stars
Rolling Stone	3/5 stars
Winnipeg Free Press	3.5/5 stars

== Critical reception ==
Although Spiritual Machines was not as successful as Our Lady Peace's previous three albums, it was highly praised by fans and critics alike as being one of Our Lady Peace's finest releases, and has also been proclaimed as being the height of their artistic creativity. Selena Gomez of the University Star of Texas State University–San Marcos called the album incredible, but also pointed out that it was a commercial disaster due to it being "flighty and difficult to palate." MacKenzie Wilson of Allmusic gave the album 4 out of 5 stars saying that "They can still deliver pinch-hitting licks and the brash attitude they did when they first formed in 1993, but they are a little older and a little wiser." A review from the Hamilton Spectator noted that the album's concluding tracks "If You Believe" and "The Wonderful Future" demonstrated a particular facility for mixing sonic textures and that there were "actually moments when vocalist Raine Maida varies from his impersonation of a singing head cold." Ashley Bird of Kerrang! noted that the album was packed with crisp, clean songwriting, odd searing post-grunge riffs and Raine Maida's nasal croon. He went on to say that the song "Life" "is one of the most perfectly weighted slices of pop-rock you'll hear."

Eddie Fournier of The New Hampshire reviewed Spiritual Machines positively but said that "The spoken word sections are intriguing, but in a way, they detract from the overall strength of the album, breaking up the momentum created by the powerful 10 songs." He concluded by saying "Overall, Spiritual Machines is a lovely album from start to finish, and even better, it is an album that will make you wonder." Cheryl Hunter of the Hartford Courant said that "It may sound formulaic, yet Maida's intelligent songwriting and nasally, but forthright vocals make Our Lady Peace more than just another faceless modern rock band." Bartley Kives of Winnipeg Free Press gave the album 3 1/2 stars out of 5, saying that Our Lady Peace had finally gotten control of their sound and calling it "easily the finest thing they've ever created."

== Touring ==
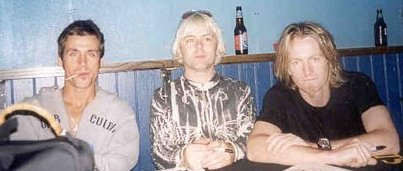
Maida, Turner and Coutts during the original Spiritual Machines tour

=== Original tours (2000–2001) ===
Our Lady Peace toured in support of Spiritual Machines from November 2000 until September 2001. The first leg of the tour began with a university warm-up tour in Ontario, then a cross-Canadian fan club appreciation tour from Vancouver, British Columbia to Ste-Foy, Quebec in which members of their fan club received free tickets. The tour continued into the United States in March 2001 with American Hi-Fi joining them as an opening act. During May 2001, the band debuted a new song they had written for WWF pro-wrestler Chris Benoit that would be included on the soundtrack WWF Forceable Entry much to the chagrin of Maida. The song had been recorded in early March and was mixed in Seattle.

Several shows during the Summer leg had to be rescheduled or canceled after Maida contracted a throat infection. A cancer scare which turned out to be harmless caused bassist Duncan Coutts to miss six weeks of touring following the shoot for the "Life" video in February. Rob Higgins of the band Change of Heart filled in for him while he recovered from surgery. Coutts would also miss several shows in June after breaking his wrist in a biking accident. The band wrapped up the tour with a performance at Music Without Borders at Toronto's Air Canada Centre on October 21, 2001. This would be their last live performance with Mike Turner. Several songs were recorded live by the band in Syracuse, New York with hopes of releasing a live album with producer Bob Rock and then to continue touring for the album. The live tracks were instead spread across various promos and singles and the band decided to record a full-length album, Gravity, with Rock.

=== Recreation tour (2010) ===
In December 2009, after a poll on Facebook, the band announced that they would be "recreating" both Spiritual Machines and their 1997 record Clumsy by performing them live in their entireties throughout a new tour that began in March 2010; nine months before the 10-year anniversary of the release of Spiritual Machines. Prior to this tour, the song "All My Friends" had never been played live and many more songs had never been played by present guitarist Steve Mazur, having joined the band in 2002.

== Track listing ==
All tracks are written by Raine Maida.

No.	Title	Length
1.	"R.K. Intro"	0:06
2.	"Right Behind You (Mafia)"	3:14
3.	"R.K. 2029"	0:15
4.	"In Repair"	3:58
5.	"Life"	4:23
6.	"Middle of Yesterday"	3:54
7.	"Are You Sad?"	5:08
8.	"R.K. 2029 (Part 2)"	0:12
9.	"Made to Heal"	3:47
10.	"R.K. 1949–97"	0:44
11.	"Everyone's a Junkie"	3:38
12.	"R.K. on Death"	0:39
13.	"All My Friends"	3:37
14.	"If You Believe"	3:35
15.	"The Wonderful Future"	20:00

- "The Wonderful Future" ends at 4:30, and is followed by roughly 12 minutes of silence, after which a hidden conversation between R.K. and Molly is heard.

Japan bonus tracks
No.	Title	Length
16.	"4am"	4:17
17.	"Clumsy"	4:29
18.	"Car Crash"	5:07

Studio outtakes
Several known outtakes from the Spiritual Machines sessions were demos carried over from the Happiness... sessions, such as "Ordinary Day" and "Sleeping In". "Ordinary" is seen being played during demo sessions for Happiness... on the band's 1998 holiday fan club video. The lyrics were published in the Pied Piper's Union Christmas 1998 newsletter. A poor quality recording of the latter is available on YouTube as well as in trading circles. Other song names such as "La Bra" and "A Waste of Violence" (or The Weight of Violence) were revealed on web casts of the recording sessions or seen on original artwork by Oli Goldsmith. A narrative outtake by Ray Kurzweil titled "R.K. Jack" was included as an intro to the track "Life" on A Decade.

In an August 18, 2000 article, it was revealed at that point that 8 songs were complete with four more being recorded in the past five weeks. This was before heading to New York to record "In Repair" and "Are You Sad", among others. Turner even noted "We've got so much music, we could even put another (album) out."

== Personnel ==
As listed in liner notes.

Musicians

- Matt Cameron – drums on "Right Behind You (Mafia)" and "Are You Sad?"
- Duncan Coutts – bass guitar
- Jamie Edwards – keyboards, electric guitar
- Ray Kurzweil – narration
- Tyler Lanni – singing on "R.K. 1949–97"
- Raine Maida – vocals
- Jeremy Taggart – drums, percussion except on "Right Behind You (Mafia)" and "Are You Sad?"
- Mike Turner – guitars

Production

- Angelo Caruso – studio engineer
- Rich Chycki – digital editing
- Chris Gauthier – digital editing
- Arnold Lanni – producer
- Raine Maida – co-producer
- Stephen Marcussen – mastering
- Brendan O'Brien – mixer
- Rob Waite – digital editing

Design

- Oli Goldsmith – artwork, layout
- Clay Patrick McBride – photography
- Catherine McRae – art direction
- Our Lady Peace – art direction

== Year-end charts ==
2000 year-end chart performance for Spiritual Machines
Chart (2000)	Position
Canadian Albums (Nielsen SoundScan)	94

2001 year-end chart performance for Spiritual Machines
Chart (2001)	Position
Canadian Albums (Nielsen SoundScan)	82

== Release history ==
Region	Date	Label	Format	Catalog
Canada	December 12, 2000	Columbia	CD/CS	CK/T 63707
United States	March 13, 2001	Columbia	CD	CK 63707
United States	March 13, 2001	Columbia	2CD	CK 63899
United Kingdom	May 9, 2001	Epic	CD	EPC 502340 2
Japan	May 9, 2001	Epic	CD	ESCA 8312
Europe	May 9, 2001	Epic	CD	
Canada	October 4, 2017	Columbia	LP	88985478401
