= Mike Turner (musician) =

English-Canadian musician (born 1963)

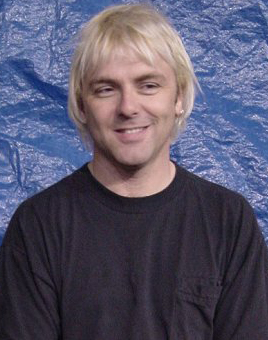
- Turner in September 2001

Background information
- Also known as: Emtee
- Born: Michael A. Turner; June 5, 1963 (age 63); Bradford, England
- Origin: Toronto, Ontario, Canada
- Genre: Alternative rock
- Occupations: Musician, songwriter, record producer
- Instruments: Guitar, vocals
- Years active: 1980s–present

Michael A. Turner (born June 5, 1963), also known as Emtee, is an English-Canadian musician and producer. He is best known as the former lead guitarist and founding member of the band Our Lady Peace and current member of alternative rock supergroup Crash Karma.

== Life and career ==
Born on June 5, 1963, in Bradford, England, Turner grew up heavily influenced by punk rock. His first guitar was a gift from his mother on his seventeenth birthday. He played in a variety of bands during the 1980s.

Turner moved to Ontario, Canada at the age of eighteen. He studied English literature at the University of Western Ontario. He lived in Saugeen-Maitland Hall at the University of Western Ontario along with fellow Our Lady Peace band member Duncan Coutts.

=== Our Lady Peace ===
==== 1991–2001 ====
In late 1991, Turner placed an ad in Toronto-based Now newspaper in search of musicians. Michael Maida, a criminology student at the University of Toronto, was the first to reply. The two formed a band called As If, inviting Jim Newell as drummer and a friend of Turner's, Paul Martin, to play bass. After they played a number of gigs in Oshawa with sets containing a mix of original and cover material, Martin departed soon after, and the band placed an ad for a replacement bassist. Chris Eacrett, a business student at Ryerson University, replied and was accepted after an audition. During that time, Turner and Maida attended a music seminar where they met songwriter and producer Arnold Lanni, the owner of Arnyard Studios. The band, with Lanni, commenced writing new material and recorded some material under the As If name.

Soon thereafter, the band's name was changed to Our Lady Peace, with Maida changing his first name to Raine to avoid confusion, after a Mark Van Doren poem of the same name. It took the band eventually a year and half of constant back and forth talks with Sony to secure a record deal. With encouragement from their producer Lanni and his management team, the band performed some gigs in Eastern Ontario and Montreal in conjunction with The Tea Party eventually supporting acts. It was not until Robert Plant of Led Zeppelin heard a song of OLP on the radio that he asked them to be a support on his tour. and Alanis Morissette.

Turner left Our Lady Peace in late 2001, citing musical and creative differences.

==== 2021–present ====
In the summer of 2021, Our Lady Peace frontman Raine Maida announced that Mike Turner was involved with the production of their tenth studio album, Spiritual Machines 2. Maida stated that it wouldn't "be right" to make a sequel to Spiritual Machines without Turner. The first Spiritual Machines album, released in 2000, was the last Our Lady Peace studio album Turner had been fully involved with prior to his original 2001 departure from the band.

Turner was also a featured special guest during Our Lady Peace's 2022 cross-country "The Wonderful Future Theatrical Experience" live tour, where he appeared in holographic form as well as performed live on stage at select venues. It was Turner's first time playing live with the band in over 20 years.

In June 2025, Turner was part of Our Lady Peace's induction into Canada's Walk of Fame alongside his former Our Lady Peace bandmates Raine Maida, Duncan Coutts, and Jeremy Taggart, as well as current band members Jason Pierce and Steve Mazur.

=== Crash Karma, other projects ===
After his 2001 departure from Our Lady Peace, he began producing music and played guitar in the Canadian band Fair Ground, with Harem Scarem guitarist Pete Lesperance. Turner was approached by Amir Epstein of Zygote and Edwin of I Mother Earth about forming a band after they met while recording in Turner's Toronto based studio. With the addition of Jeff Burrows of The Tea Party, Crash Karma released their first single "Awake" in 2009 followed by a debut album in March 2010.

Inspired by his work with producers Arnold Lanni and Bob Rock, he became very interested in the production side of music, and decided to produce and write full-time.

He experimented with live recordings, using a small mobile recording rig of his own design. He also built a private recording studio in his home, taking on projects for labels like Capitol, EMI and Sony. Turner then opened a public recording studio in Toronto called The Pocket with a few partners from the music industry. The partnership has since dissolved although Turner remains active at the studio hosting diverse artists including Alert the Medic, Shaye, Luke Doucet, Hawksley Workman, Sloan, and Feist. Recordings from The Pocket, with Turner producing have won two Canadian Broadcast awards, one in 2009 for "Afflicted" by Age of Days and again in 2011 for Crash Karma as Rock Group of the Year.

== Contributions and awards ==
=== Discography ===
==== Our Lady Peace ====
- Naveed (1994)
- Clumsy (1997)
- Happiness... Is Not a Fish That You Can Catch (1999)
- Spiritual Machines (2000)
- Gravity (2001)
- Spiritual Machines 2 (2021)

==== Fair Ground ====
- Down In It (2006)

==== Crash Karma ====
- Crash Karma (2010)
- Rock Musique Deluxe (2013)

=== Award wins and nominations ===
| Award | Year | Nominated work | Category | Result |
|---|---|---|---|---|
| JUNO Awards | 1995 | Naveed with Our Lady Peace | Best Alternative Album | Nominated |
| JUNO Awards | 1995 | Naveed with Our Lady Peace | Best Album Design | Won |
| JUNO Awards | 1998 | Clumsy with Our Lady Peace | Best Selling Album (Foreign or Domestic) | Nominated |
| JUNO Awards | 1998 | Clumsy with Our Lady Peace | Album of the Year | Nominated |
| JUNO Awards | 1998 | Clumsy with Our Lady Peace | Single of the Year | Nominated |
| JUNO Awards | 1998 | Clumsy with Our Lady Peace | Group of the Year | Won |
| JUNO Awards | 1998 | Clumsy with Our Lady Peace | Blockbuster Rock Album of the Year | Won |
| JUNO Awards | 2000 | Happiness...Is Not A Fish That You Can Catch with Our Lady Peace | Best Group | Nominated |
| JUNO Awards | 2000 | Happiness...Is Not A Fish That You Can Catch with Our Lady Peace | Best Rock Album | Nominated |
| JUNO Awards | 2001 | Happiness...Is Not A Fish That You Can Catch with Our Lady Peace | Best Album | Nominated |
| JUNO Awards | 2001 | Thief with Our Lady Peace | Best Video | Nominated |
| MuchMusic Video Awards | 1997 | Superman's Dead with Our Lady Peace | Favourite Video | Won |
| MuchMusic Video Awards | 1997 | Superman's Dead with Our Lady Peace | Favourite Group | Won |
| MuchMusic Video Awards | 1998 | 4 AM with Our Lady Peace | Favourite Group | Won |
| MuchMusic Video Awards | 2000 | One Man Army with Our Lady Peace | Favourite Group | Won |
| MuchMusic Video Awards | 2000 | One Man Army with Our Lady Peace | Favourite Video | Won |
| MuchMusic Video Awards | 2001 | In Repair with Our Lady Peace | Best Video | Won |
| CASBY Awards | 1995 | Naveed with Our Lady Peace | Favourite New Album | Won |
| CASBY Awards | 1995 | Naveed with Our Lady Peace | Favourite New Song | Won |
| CASBY Awards | 1995 | Naveed with Our Lady Peace | Favourite New Artist | Won |
| CRMA Awards | 2009 | Afflicted with Age of Days | Best New Group | Won |
| Independent Music Awards | 2011 | Crash Karma with Crash Karma | Rock Group of the Year | Won |

| Preceded by Original | Our Lady Peace guitarist 1992–2001 | Succeeded by Steve Mazur |
