= Rock Musique Deluxe =

Studio album by Crash Karma
- Released: August 6, 2013
- Recorded: The Pocket Studios, 2013
- Genre: Rock, pop rock, alternative rock
- Length: 45:43
- Label: eOne Music
- Producer: Terry Brown, Mike Turner

Crash Karma chronology
Crash Karma (2010)	Rock Musique Deluxe (2013)

Singles from Crash Karma
- 1. "Tomorrow (feat. Ian D'Sa)" Released: June 18, 2013

Rock Musique Deluxe is the second album by Canadian alternative rock band Crash Karma. It was released on August 6, 2013.

== Track listing ==
1. "Appetite For Life" – 3:50
2. "Tomorrow (ft. Ian D'Sa)" – 3:20
3. "Man on Trial" – 3:36
4. "Everything" – 4:35
5. "Finally Free" – 3:30
6. "What Ever Happened" – 3:47
7. "Leave Her Alone" – 3:42
8. "Spinning" – 3:35
9. "It's For Love" – 3:54
10. "When You're Gone" – 3:45
11. "Tonight" – 4:26
12. "Don't It Feel" (Bonus Track) – 3:43

== Personnel ==
- Edwin – Vocals
- Mike Turner – Guitar
- Jeff Burrows – Drums, Percussion
- Amir Epstein – Bass
