= The End Is Where We Begin (song) =

Single by Our Lady Peace

from the album Burn Burn
- Released: September 14, 2009
- Recorded: 2009
- Genre: Alternative rock
- Length: 3:23
- Label: Coalition Entertainment
- Songwriter(s): Raine Maida
- Producer(s): Raine Maida

Our Lady Peace singles chronology
"All You Did Was Save My Life" (2009)	"The End Is Where We Begin" (2009)	"Heavyweight" (2011)

Music video
- "The End Is Where We Begin" on YouTube

"The End Is Where We Begin" is the second single from Our Lady Peace's seventh studio album Burn Burn. The single was released in Canada on September 14.

The music video for "The End Is Where We Begin" was released on October 21, 2009. It premiered on Our Lady Peace's official website.

== Charts ==
Chart	Peak position
U.S. Alternative Songs	40
Canadian Hot 100	93
