= Crash Karma (album) =

Studio album by Crash Karma
- Released: March 16, 2010
- Recorded: The Pocket Studios, 2009
- Genres: Rock, pop rock, alternative rock
- Length: 38:41
- Label: eOne Music
- Producer: Mike Turner

Crash Karma chronology
Crash Karma (2010)	Rock Musique Deluxe (2013)

Singles from Crash Karma
- 1. "Awake" Released: July 10, 2009; 2. "Fight" Released: March 15, 2010; 3. "On My Own" Released: September 21, 2010

Crash Karma is the self-titled debut album by Canadian alternative rock band Crash Karma. It was released on March 16, 2010, through eOne Music. The world premiere of the album took place live on the internet on March 15. The first single, "Awake", was released on November 12, 2009. The album debuted at No. 38 on the Canadian Albums Chart.

== Track listing ==
1. "Like a Wave" - 3:47
2. "Awake" - 3:57
3. "Next Life" - 3:50
4. "Lost" (featuring Ian Thornley) - 4:37
5. "Fight" - 3:24
6. "The Fire" - 3:39
7. "Man I Used to be" - 3:46
8. "Energy" - 3:52
9. "On My Own" - 3:38
10. "Not About Anger" - 3:17
11. "Live a Little" - 3:34

== Personnel ==
- Edwin – vocals
- Mike Turner – guitar
- Jeff Burrows – drums, percussion
- Amir Epstein – bass
