= Age of Days =

Canadian alternative rock band

- Also known as: Age of Daze
- Origin: Fredericton, New Brunswick
- Genres: Alternative rock, post-grunge, hard rock
- Years active: 2005–present
- Labels: Cordova Bay Records, Fontana North, Universal Music Group
- Members: Tim Morrison; Matt McLaughlin; Brent Alvey; Mike Langford
- Past members: Jamie Norrad; Jon Price; Pat Pelletier; Mike Diesel; Brad Bailey
- Website: ageofdays.com

Age of Days (formerly Age of Daze) is a Canadian alternative rock band that formed in Fredericton, New Brunswick in 2005.

== Band history ==
Vocalist Tim Morrison, bassist Matt McLaughlin and lead guitarist Jamie Norrad originally met while playing in a local cover band. They began writing and abandoned the cover band scene to focus on original material; guitarist Jon Price joined the band prior to the recording of their first EP in October 2005.

The band released their debut (independent) EP Age of Daze in 2006. The six-song EP was recorded at The Pocket Studios in Toronto, Ontario, and was produced by former Our Lady Peace guitarist Mike Turner. The EP was a modest success and allowed the band to open for such acts as Collective Soul, Wide Mouth Mason and Hedley.

The band entered The Pocket Studios again in June 2007, with drummer Pat Pelletier, to record their sophomore CD entitled Hollywood Ending with Turner again at the helm. The album was released through Universal Music Canada on August 19, 2008, and distributed through Fontana North/Universal Music Canada and iTunes worldwide. The first single, "Afflicted", was added to Sirius' Octane channel and was the band's first major exposure in the US market. The song reached No.17 on Canadian Rock charts (BDS), and was No.1 on the Sirius Rock 20 Countdown for two weeks. The second single in Canada, Overrated, reached No.28 on the Active Rock charts.

In the summer of 2009, Age of Daze completed their first Canadian tour supporting such acts as Hinder, Buckcherry, Papa Roach, Rev Theory, Default, and State of Shock.

The band won a 2009 Canadian Radio Music Award as Best New Group or Solo Artist (Rock). At the 2009 East Coast Music Awards, Hollywood Ending was nominated for Rock Recording of the Year, and "Afflicted" was nominated for Song of the Year. They took part in the 2009 Rock on the Range in Winnipeg, Manitoba, and performed for TLC's Orange County Choppers 10th Anniversary in New York City.

In 2011, Morrison and McLaughlin relocated to Toronto, parting ways with the remaining New Brunswick members. 2011 also brought new management—Mascioli Entertainment, and new guitarist Brent Alvey. It was at this time that they adopted the name Age of Days, signalling a fresh start.

In March 2012, the band began work on Radioactivity with Juno Award-winning producer Brian Howes (Hinder, Nickelback, Puddle of Mudd, Rev Theory, Hedley). Morrison and McLaughlin co-wrote three of the album's songs with Howes, including the lead single Bombs Away, which reached #16 on the Canadian Active Rock charts (Mediabase). The second track on the album, Now Or Never, was co-written with Sal Costa (formerly of My Darkest Days) and features Costa on guitar and synths as well as Hinder's Cody Hanson on drums.

In July 2012, Age of Days signed with Canadian indie label Cordova Bay Records. The band then hit the road with the addition of Mike Langford on drums, and Mike Diesel filling in on rhythm guitar. The new lineup debuted at the Boonstock Music Festival in Gibbons, Alberta.

In early 2013, the band finished recording Radioactivity at J4 Studios in Toronto with producer Justin Forsley and released the album in Canada on April 9, 2013.

The band hit the road in June 2013 on a western Canadian tour, featuring a combination of headline shows and direct support slots for Grammy-winning Pennsylvania band Halestorm. The tour was marred by a collision with a moose near Thunder Bay, Ontario, en route to the first show. But despite the accident, which caused minor injuries and demolished their touring vehicle, the band made every date. Fall 2013 saw the band complete their most comprehensive tour to date, opening for Papa Roach and Pop Evil on a three-band bill. The tour featured dates across North America, beginning in British Columbia and wrapping up in New Jersey. This was the band's first major touring exposure in the US.

In June 2018, Age of Days released a new single and lyric video for their cover of Roxette’s hit song "The Look", featuring guest vocals by Butcher Babies' Heidi Shepherd. In 2021, the band was due to tour with Buckcherry and Bif Naked, but the shows were cancelled due to Covid restrictions.

== Band members ==
Current

- Tim Morrison – lead vocals, rhythm guitar
- Matt McLaughlin – bass, backing vocals
- Brent Alvey – lead guitar
- Mike Langford – drums

Former

- Jon Price – lead guitar (2005–2010)
- Jamie Norrad – lead guitar (2005–2011)
- Brad Bailey – lead guitar (2010–2011)
- Pat Pelletier – drums (2007–2011)

== Discography ==
Year	Information
2005	Age of Daze: Release Date: 2005; Label: Independent; Format: EP
2008	Hollywood Ending: Release Date: August 19, 2008; Label: Fontana North/Universal Music Canada; Format: CD, digital download; Singles: Afflicted, Overrated
2013	Radioactivity: Release Date: April 9, 2013; Label: Cordova Bay Records; Format: CD, digital download; Singles: Bombs Away, Broken
