= Right Behind You (Mafia) =

2001 single by Our Lady Peace

Single by Our Lady Peace

from the album Spiritual Machines
- Released: July 2, 2001
- Recorded: 2000
- Genre: Alternative rock, post-grunge
- Length: 3:14
- Label: Columbia 2574
- Songwriter(s): Raine Maida
- Producer(s): Arnold Lanni & Raine Maida

Our Lady Peace singles chronology
"Life" (2000)	"Right Behind You (Mafia)" (2001)	"Somewhere Out There" (2002)

Music video
- "Right Behind You (Mafia)" on YouTube

"Right Behind You (Mafia)" is a song by Canadian alternative rock group Our Lady Peace. It was released in July 2001 as the third and final single from their fourth studio album, Spiritual Machines. The single underperformed, ultimately causing its release as well as that of its music video to be aborted. It was also their last single released with founding guitarist Mike Turner in the band. Matt Cameron of Pearl Jam performed the drums on this song while Our Lady Peace's own drummer, Jeremy Taggart, was recovering from injury.

== Background ==
This song, like many others on the album, was inspired by Ray Kurzweil's book The Age of Spiritual Machines. According to Raine, it was written as more of a retort to Kurzweil's predictions which Raine noticed didn't involve the human spirit as a factor. "..[which is] not an 'F-You' to Kurzweil. It's like 'I believe [much of] what you're saying, but we're going to fight it as well because there is a soul and there is a spirit.'" Its original title was "Spirit Mafia" or just "Mafia". While being the first song on the album, it is the second track following Kurzweil's 6-second introduction.

== Music video ==
The music video for "Right Behind You" was directed by Oli Goldsmith, who created all of the artwork for the Spiritual Machines project. The video was not released until 2008 on OurLadyPeace.com. The video shows the band performing within a collage of pictures of buildings and people in the fetal position mixed with live action videos.
