= We, the Weapon =

Studio album by Alert the Medic
- Released: September 19, 2009
- Recorded: 2009
- Studio: Halla Music Recording Studios, Greendoor Studios, Sunnyside Studios, The Echo Chamber, Studio 313
- Genre: Rock
- Length: 42:45
- Label: Independent
- Producer: Laurence Currie

Singles from Alert The Medic
- 1. "Atlas" Released: September 2, 2009; 2. "Aid The Getaway" Released: February 2, 2010; 3. "The Weatherman (Pt. 2)" Released: October 5, 2010; 4. "Hey Kid, To The Back of the Line" Released: July 11, 2012

We, the Weapon is the second full-length release by Canadian rock band Alert the Medic. The album was Produced, Recorded and Mixed by Laurence Currie. We, the Weapon was recorded between Toronto, Ontario and Halifax, Nova Scotia at Halla Music, Greendoor Studios, Sunnyside Studios, The Echo Chamber and Studio 313 in the Spring of 2009 and was mastered by Noah Mintz at the Lacquer Channel in Toronto. Additional recordings were done by Charles Austin, Dave Ewenson and Ryan MacDonald. It was released independently on September 19, 2009.

== Track listing ==
1. "Atlas" – 4:21
2. "Cause For Alarm" – 3:38
3. "Let's Hear It For The Symphony" – 3:36
4. "Cardboard Cutout" – 3:31
5. "The Weatherman (PT. 2)" – 4:37
6. "Aid The Getaway" – 2:44
7. "Hey, Kid To The Back Of The Line" – 3:59
8. "Stealing Scenery" – 3:02
9. "The Tortoise And The Hare" – 4:02
10. "Cross Your Fingers" – 4:00
11. "The Wound That Wont Heal" – 5:15

== Personnel ==
- Ryan MacDonald – Vocals, Guitar, Keyboard
- Matt Campbell – Bass guitar, Vocals
- Dale Wilson – Drums, Percussion, Vocals
- Troy Arseneault – Guitar, Vocals

With

- Rob Crowell – Keyboard on Track 1,2,5,7,8,9,10,11
- Scott Long – Bagpipes on Track 10
- Brad MacDonald – Group Vocals on Track 3,7,10

Art

- Jud Haynes – Art Direction and Layout
- Chr!s Sm!th – Band Photo
