= Heavyweight (song) =

Single by Our Lady Peace

from the album Curve
- Released: December 20, 2011
- Genre: Alternative rock
- Length: 4:16
- Label: Coalition Entertainment/Warner Music Canada
- Songwriters: Raine Maida, Duncan Coutts, Steve Mazur, Jeremy Taggart

Our Lady Peace singles chronology
"The End Is Where We Begin" (2010)	"Heavyweight" (2011)	"Won’t Turn Back" (2014)

Music video
- "Heavyweight" on YouTube

"Heavyweight" is a song by Canadian rock group Our Lady Peace. It was released on December 20, 2011, as the lead single from the band's eighth studio album, Curve.

== Music videos ==
A lyrics video for "Heavyweight", directed by Cut Cartel & Our Lady Peace, was released on December 19. An official music video was released on March 20, 2012.

The official music video, directed by Christopher Mills, was shot on location in Bowmanville, Ontario, Canada. An abandoned house on Holt Road was used for filming and included scenes with the band members (with no performance shots) and fire. The house was then blown up in a spectacular special effect explosion after being prepared for 1 week by a special effects team, NEXUS Canada SpFX, co ordinated by pyrotechnician James Sled. The explosion took place on January 29, 2012, at 12 o`clock noon.

== Charts ==
Chart (2012)	Peak position
Canada Hot 100 (Billboard)	89
Canada Rock Chart	2
