= Daniel Desnoyers =

Canadian DJ

Dan D-Noy
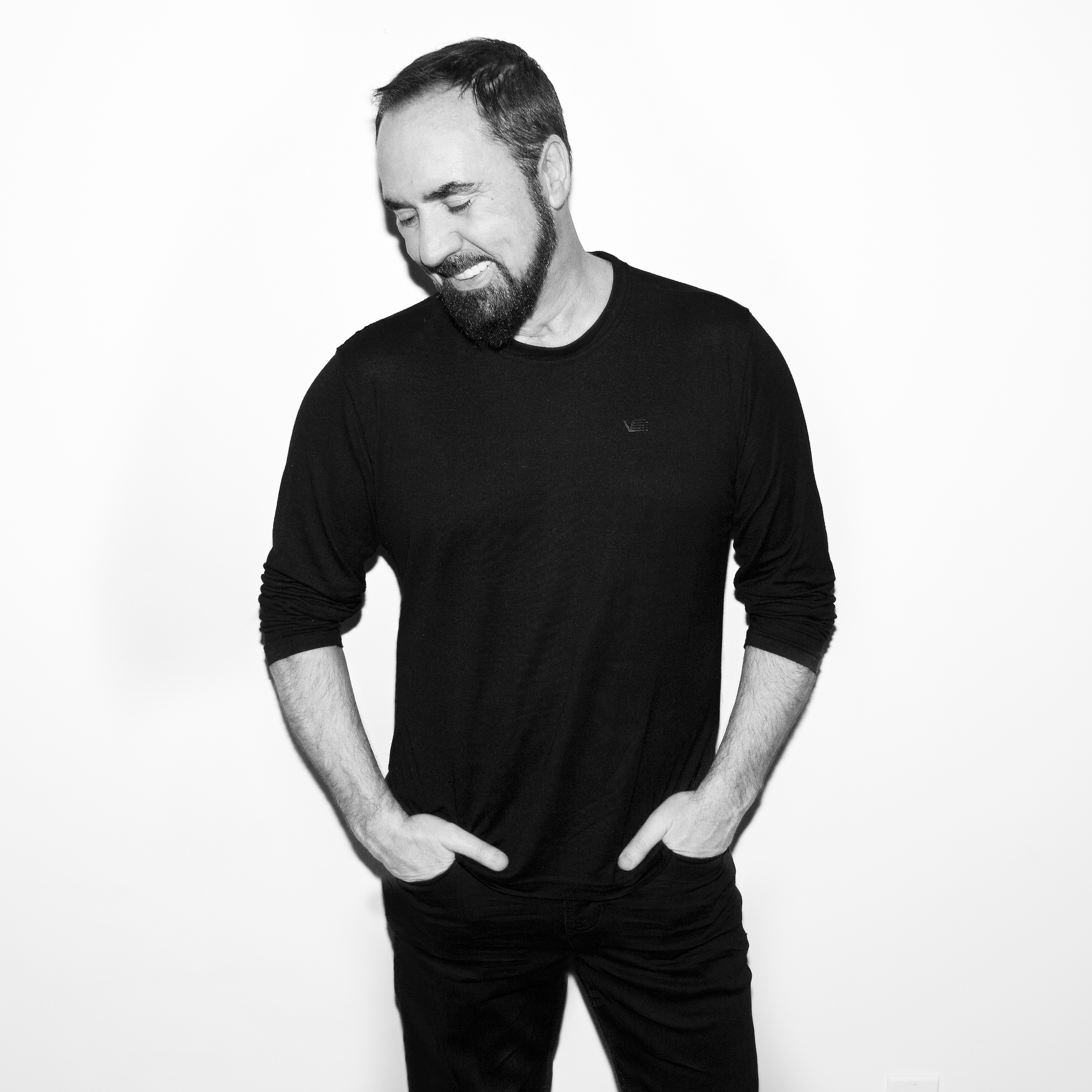
- Dan D-Noy in 2020

Background information
- Born: Daniel Desnoyers; Montreal, Quebec, Canada
- Genres: House
- Occupation: DJ
- Years active: 1993–present
- Labels: D-Noy Muzik, Sony Music Canada, Ultra Records
- Website: www.d-noy.com

Daniel Desnoyers, also known by his stage name Dan D-Noy, is a Canadian DJ and owner of D-Noy Muzik. Desnoyers is the official Canada DJ for the Pacha clubs. He is best known for his song "Good World", which was a hit in Europe. Among his other original compositions, "I Said" made it to the top 10 of the Canadian Dance Chart, "Moon Sharm" in the top 40 and "4 Ladies" obtained success in the clubs of Canada.

== Biography ==
Dan Desnoyers worked as a VJ and also as a manager of DanseXpress with the TV channel MusiquePlus from 1993 to 2002. The six albums from the series DanseXpress were also created around that time. From 2001 to 2006, he was the official DJ of the Galas Interbox at the Bell Centre in Montreal.

Producer, director, sound engineer, mixer, remixer and CD conceptor, Daniel Desnoyers eventually started in June 1999 his own music label, DKD D-Noy Muzik, within the Donald K. Donald Group. In 2003, DKD D-Noy Muzik became D-Noy Muzik and since that time Dan Desnoyers is the sole owner.

In June 2000, Daniel Desnoyers created the compilation Touchdown 2000 for the cheerleaders of the Alouettes de Montréal. He is also the creator of the series Spin (Vol. 1 to 6). At the beginning of 2000, he was co-host and DJ on the radio show Le Beat on Énergie who was broadcast on the whole network every Friday evenings, which counted 1 700 000 listeners. This show engendered the compilations Le Beat, Vol. 1 to 6.

On June 15, 2004, he published Tandem a double CD with thirty house titles mixed by himself and French DJ Antoine Clamaran. On July 17, 2004, Daniel Desnoyers packed up his turntables and moved from Énergie to Montreal's CKOI 96,9 for a new radio show called Spin. The compilations Power Spin, Vol. 1 to 3, were released at the same time. In 2005, Daniel Desnoyers began a new series Le Nightclub with vocal house flavour.

In August 2006, Daniel Desnoyers returned to work for Énergie on the radio shows Le Party 5 @ 8 and Pure Dan Desnoyers. In these shows, Dan Desnoyers played the hottest new tracks and special requests from the listeners. Two new series of compilations, In Da House and Club Sound, were released. Dan left the radio in August 2010.

After a passage in Pacha Club Ibiza in Spain, Pacha Records Label and D-Noy Muzik joined to create the compilation, Live at Pacha Club Ibiza (2007). Four more compilations of the same style were created after his performances at Pacha Club Egypt, Live at Pacha Club Egypt – Sharm El Sheikh (2008), at Pacha Club Brazil, Live at Pacha Club Brazil – Sao Paulo (2009), at Pacha Club Moscow, Live at Pacha Club Moscow (2010) and Pacha Ibiza (2014).

In May 2014, Dan D-Noy signed with Ultra Records and mixed the Ultra Mix 6 compilation for the label.

After a stay at Pacha Club Ibiza in Spain, Pacha Records Label and D-Noy Muzik teamed up to create the compilation Live at Pacha Club Ibiza (2007). Three other compilations of the same genre were created following his performances at Pacha Club Egypt, Live at Pacha Club Egypt Sharm El Sheikh (2008), at Pacha Club Brazil, Live at Pacha Club Brazil São Paulo (2009), at Pacha Club Moscow, Live at Pacha Club Moscow (2010) and Pacha Ibiza (2014).

In 2018, Dan D-Noy celebrated 30 years his career, preparing several collaborations for the coming months. The song There with you (Feat. Margau & Garrett Raff) V.F became popular in the summer of 2018. A remix version by Kalvaro was made available in June.

His song ''Prêt à tout'' with Adamo and Doug St-Louis became the official song of the Telus TV campaign for the summer 2021 season. Dan D-Noy also signed the soundtrack of the TV campaign Vincent d' Amerique with the participation of Georges St-Pierre.

Dan D-Noy has sold more than a million copies of his compilations: DanseXpress, Spin, Le Beat, Power Spin, Le Nightclub, In Da House, Club Sound, Pacha, Summer Session and Winter Session. Dan has also continued to make performances in various clubs of Quebec, Canada, Europe and the United States.

== Compositions ==
Year	Title	Featured Artist
2004	"4 Ladies"	Peakafeller
2004	"I Said"	
2005	"Can You Hear The Butterflies"	Blossom
2006	"Good World"	Pepper MaShay
2007	"Be Free"	Danick
2007	"Time 2 Move"	Peakafeller
2008	"Moon Sharm"	
2008	"Change My Life"	Rick Hughes
2008	"Love Is Like Muzik"	Rick Hughes
2009	"Flight 121"	
2009	"Tekmachine"	
2009	"Been There Done That!"	
2009	"Daba Dabi"	
2009	"Call Me Love"	Lulu Hughes
2010	"Turn It Around"	
2010	"I Said 2010 "I'm With The DJ""	
2010	"Kalinka"	
2010	"Kick The Ground"	
2010	"You Gotta Do It"	
2011	"Back Again"	
2011	"The Clown Song"	Peakafeller
2011	"5 O'Clock"	
2011	"Be A Star"	

Year	Title	Featured Artist
2012	"Rock My World Tonight"	Jodee
2012	"Drop The Bomb"	Midaz & Ellie
2012	"Eh Walla"	
2012	"A-One"	
2012	"It Wasn't Me"	
2012	"Tear It Up"	Sandy Duperval
2013	"It Goes On"	Jodee & P-A
2013	"See Ya (At The Club)"	
2013	"No War Call"	
2013	"Go!"	
2014	"Take Me Back"	Sandy Duperval
2014	"Unbreakable"	
2014	"Can You Hear The Butterflies 2014"	Blossom
2015	"Bad Habit"	
2016	"Keep It Going"	Candela & WyseMan
2017	"Just Take My Hand"	Nico Larsson & Matt Shelby
2017	"Take Over Me"	Tina DeCara & Lewis Rayn
2017	"No Destination"	Nick Kyz & Rough Gentlemen
2018	"Satellite"	Jesse Owen & Rama Duke
2018	"There with you"	Molio, Margau, Garrett Raff
2018	"I'll Be Your Island"	Georgette,
2019	"Prêt à Tout"	Adamo, Doug St-Louis
2020	"Te Revoir"	Koraly

== Remixes ==
Year	Title	Artist
2006	"I'll Be Your Light"	Kristine W
2006	"Rock Bitch"	Plastic Funk
2007	"You You You"	James Kakande
2008	"Together"	Bob Sinclar
2009	"Love You No More"	Bob Sinclar feat. Shabba Ranks
2010	"What U Like"	Teo Moss feat. Daniel Shems & Phylly
2010	"I Wanna"	Bob Sinclar & Sahara feat. Shaggy
2010	"Rainbow Of Love"	Bob Sinclar feat. Ben Onono
2011	"You Can Leave Your Hat On"	Miss Ketty
2011	"Move Up & Down"	Mademoiselle Luna & Miss Autumn Leaves
2011	"Falling"	Danny Dove & Ben Preston feat. Susie Ledge
2012	"Crazy"	Evâa Pearl feat. Humphrey
2012	"Rock The Casbah"	Tradelove
2012	"Señorita"	Eddy Wata
2012	"Back To The Hustle"	Greenwich Village Syndicate
2012	"You See The Trouble With Me"	Black Legend
2012	"Superstar"	Eddy Wata
2012	"Bonito"	Joe Rivetto and Mol & Ben
2012	"Viva Las Vegas"	Tony Sylla & Yves Larock
2012	"Pum Back"	Tradelove
2013	"Rainbow"	Gold1 & Trina feat. Nicki Minaj
2013	"My Season"	Dor Dekel & Itay Kalderon feat. Eddy Wata
2013	"Dance For Life"	Gold 1 feat. Flo Rida & Shun Ward
2014	"In All Your Glory"	Spada & Bonnie Rabson
2018	"There with you"	Kalvaro

== See also ==
- D-Noy Muzik
