= Life (Our Lady Peace song) =

2000 single by Our Lady Peace

Single by Our Lady Peace

from the album Spiritual Machines
- Released: December 20, 2000
- Recorded: September – November 2000
- Genre: Alternative rock, post-grunge, pop rock
- Length: 4:23 (Spiritual Machines); 4:44(A Decade)
- Label: Columbia
- Songwriter(s): Raine Maida
- Producer(s): Arnold Lanni & Raine Maida

Our Lady Peace singles chronology
| "In Repair" (2000) | "Life" (2000) | "Right Behind You (Mafia)" (2001) |

Music video
- "Life" on YouTube

"Life" is a song by Canadian rock group Our Lady Peace. It was released in December 2000 as the second single from their fourth studio album, Spiritual Machines and the most successful from that album. The song was nominated for "Best Single" at the 2002 Juno Awards, losing to Nickelback's "How You Remind Me". A sample can be heard in the Trailer Park Boys episode "Say Goodnight to the Bad Guys". It can also be heard in the show's 2006 film adaptation.

== Background ==
This song, like the rest on the album, was partially inspired by Ray Kurzweil's book The Age of Spiritual Machines. While directly following the track "In Repair" on the studio album, on the band's 2006 compilation album, A Decade, the track is immediately preceded by a spoken excerpt by Ray Kurzweil titled "R.K. Jack" that was recorded during the Spiritual Machines sessions and previously unreleased.

== Content ==
In a 2001 interview in Billboard, Maida said of the lyrics for "Life": "That song to me was such a simple premise. It's really about positive energy. Everybody deals with simple things that get people down, like money problems. You just have to deal with stuff and turn any negative energy into positive energy. That's the way to get through life."

== Music videos ==
The first video for "Life", shot at Montreal's Mirabel Airport, was never released due to the band's creative differences with the director.

Two versions of the Marcos Siega directed music video for "Life" were released, one in the United States and the other for Canada. The Canadian version premiered on Muchmusic on April 5, 2001, and hit number-one on the Muchmusic Countdown on August 3 of that year. It is the original and features the band playing in an all white room. Various scenes with distressed people are shown throughout the video. In the American version, released on April 20, 2001, the scenes with the people are cut out. Both videos begin with the Chinese representation of "Our Lady Peace" and the Chinese symbol for life. The Chinese symbol for "courage" appears to be painted on the side of Raine Maida's head which is then repeated at the end of both videos.

The music video received two nominations for "Best Post-Production" and "Best Cinematography" at the 2001 MuchMusic Video Awards.

== Track listing ==
=== US Promo CD ===
Columbia CSK 16436

1. "(Album Version)" - 4:23

=== Australian CD Single ===
Epic EPK 6718742

1. "Life" - 4:23
2. "Is Anybody Home?"
3. "Clumsy (Live & Unreleased)" - 4:25
4. "Car Crash (Live & Unreleased)" - 5:52

== Chart performance ==
| Chart (2001) | Peak position |
|---|---|
| US Billboard Modern Rock Tracks | 27 |

=== Year-end charts ===
Year-end chart performance for "Life" by Our Lady Peace
| Chart (2001) | Position |
|---|---|
| Canada Radio (Nielsen BDS) | 55 |
