= Crash Karma =

Canadian alternative rock band

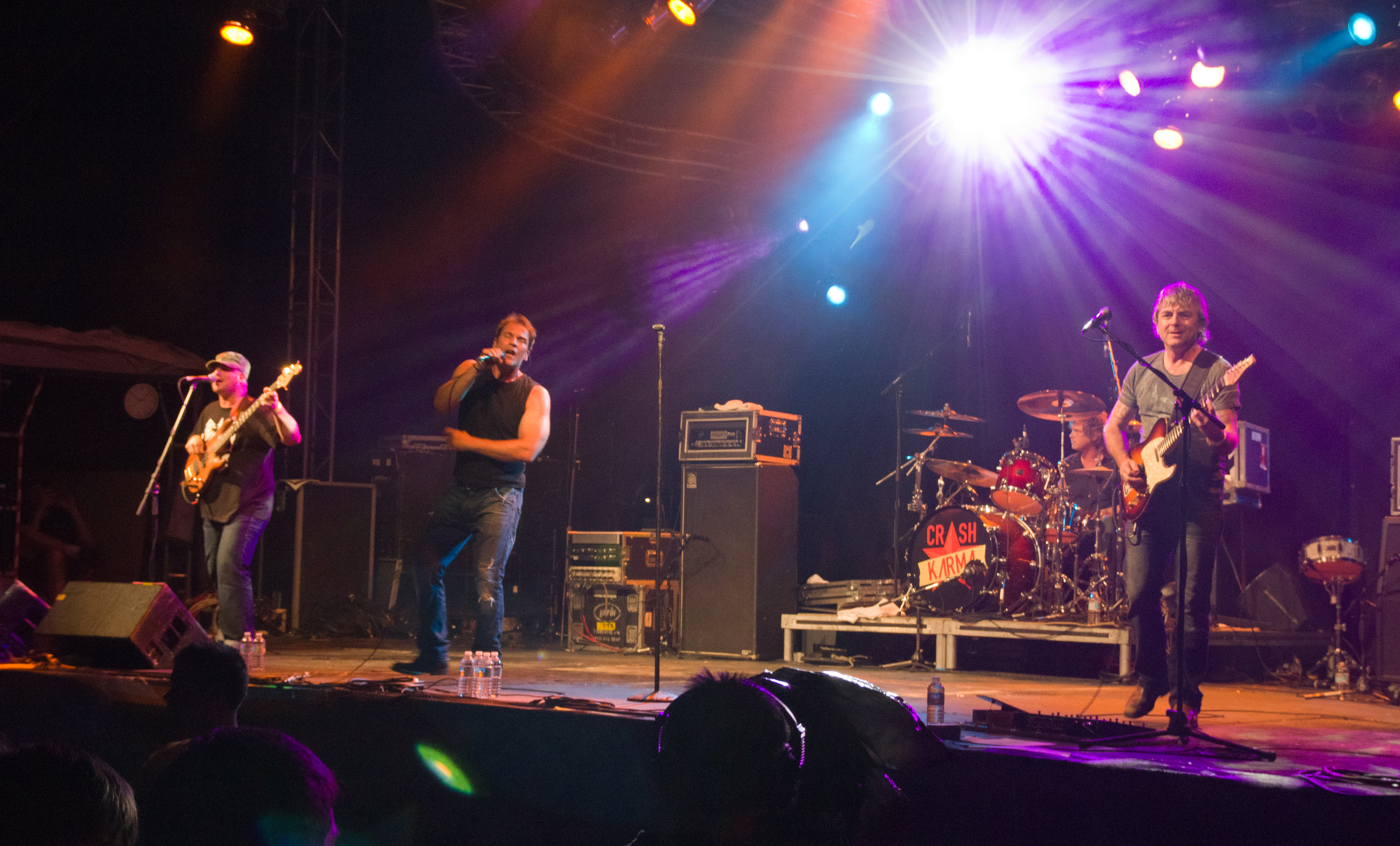
- Crash Karma in 2011

Background information
- Origin: Toronto, Ontario, Canada
- Genre: Alternative rock
- Years active: 2008–present
- Label: eOne Music
- Members: Jeff Burrows; Edwin; Amir Epstein; Mike Turner

Crash Karma is a Canadian alternative rock supergroup consisting of lead singer Edwin (of I Mother Earth), Mike Turner (formerly of Our Lady Peace), Jeff Burrows (of The Tea Party), and Amir Epstein of Zygote.

== History ==
Crash Karma was founded when Edwin, Epstein and Turner came together in 2008. Burrows was recruited soon after. The band's first full live concert was held in Burlington, Ontario on June 20, 2009. Their first single "Awake" was self-released in July, 2009. Their self-titled debut album was produced by founding member Mike Turner and was released in March, 2010.

In 2013, the band released an album, Rock Musique Deluxe, and was featured on CHCH Television's program Live Music. They then went on tour in support of the album.

== Band members ==
- Edwin – lead vocals
- Mike Turner – guitar, backing vocals
- Amir Epstein – bass guitar, backing vocals
- Jeff Burrows – drums, percussion

== Discography ==
=== Studio albums ===
- Crash Karma (2010) - No. 38 (CAN)
- Rock Musique Deluxe (2013)

=== Singles ===
Year	Song	Chart positions			Album
Year	Song	CAN	CAN Rock	CAN Alt	Album
2009	"Awake"	—	5	17	Crash Karma
2010	"Fight"	—	9	18	Crash Karma
2010	"On My Own"	—	15	—	Crash Karma
2013	"Tomorrow" (featuring Ian D'Sa)	—	11	—	Rock Musique Deluxe
