= Automatic Flowers =

Single by Our Lady Peace

from the album Clumsy
- Released: July 14, 1997
- Recorded: 1996
- Genre: Post-grunge; alternative rock
- Length: 4:05
- Label: Columbia 1271
- Songwriters: Raine Maida, Arnold Lanni
- Producer: Arnold Lanni

Our Lady Peace singles chronology
"Clumsy" (1997)	"Automatic Flowers" (1997)	"4am" (1997)

Music video
- "Automatic Flowers" on YouTube

"Automatic Flowers" is a song by Canadian alternative rock group Our Lady Peace. It was released in July 1997 as the third single from their second studio album, Clumsy.

== Background and writing ==
In writing the song, Raine Maida began by thinking about a woman who lived alone in her apartment. The woman has little going on in her life, and the apartment is dingy, without much of a view. She has boxes from her childhood, and one day she takes out a pop-up book and opens it to a garden with pop-up flowers. Whenever she wants to cheer herself up, she opens the book. Maida puts only traces of the entire history in the lyrics.

== Music video ==
For the first time, Our Lady Peace self-directed their music video for this song. The video consists of the band playing in a dimly lit room (a rehearsal space in Toronto). The video reached the #1 spot on the Muchmusic countdown on October 15, 1997. In 1998 it was ranked #47 for Muchmusic's favourite videos of all time.

== Chart performance ==
Chart (1997)	Peak position
Canada Top Singles (RPM)	29
Canada Alternative Top 30 (RPM)	8
