= D-Noy Muzik =

Record label

- Parent company: Sony Music Canada
- Founded: 1999 (as DKD D-Noy Muzik)
- Founder: Daniel Desnoyers
- Genre: House
- Country of origin: Canada
- Location: Montreal
- Official website: www.d-noy.com

D-Noy Muzik is a label founded by Daniel Desnoyers in June 1999 within the Donald K. Donald Group. In 2003, DKD D-Noy Muzik became D-Noy Muzik, for which Dan Desnoyers is the sole owner. D-Noy releases all of his music on this label.

== Releases ==
Year	Title	Release date
1998	DanseXpress Vol. 1	
1998	DanseXpress Vol. 2	
1999	DanseXpress Vol. 3	
2000	Spin Vol. 1	
2000	DanseXpress Vol. 4	
2000	DanseXpress Vol. 5	
2000	DanseXpress Vol. 6	
2000	Touchdown 2000	
2001	Le Beat Vol. 1	January 16
2001	Spin Vol. 2	April 10
2001	Le Beat Vol. 2	August 7
2001	Spin Vol. 3	October 30
2002	Le Beat Vol. 3	January 15
2002	Spin Vol. 4	May 28
2002	Le Beat Vol. 4	September 1
2002	Radioactif 1	November 19
2003	Spin Vol. 5	February 25
2003	Le Beat Vol. 5	May 20
2003	Spin Vol. 6	October 7
2004	Le Beat Vol. 6	January 27
2004	Tandem	June 15
2004	Power Spin Vol. 1	September 28
2005	Le Nightclub Vol. 1	March 22
2005	Power Spin Vol. 2	June 21
2005	Le Nightclub Vol. 2	October 25

Year	Title	Release date
2006	Power Spin Vol. 3	February 21
2006	Le Nightclub Vol. 3	May 30
2006	In Da House Vol. 1	September 19
2007	Live at Pacha Club Ibiza	January 23
2007	In Da House Vol. 2	May 8
2007	Club Sound Vol. 1	September 11
2008	Live at Pacha Club Egypt	January 29
2008	Summer Session 2008	May 20
2008	In Da House Vol. 3	September 30
2009	Live at Pacha Club Brazil	January 27
2009	Summer Session 2009	May 26
2009	In Da House Vol. 4	September 29
2010	Live at Pacha Club Moscow	January 26
2010	Summer Session 2010	May 25
2010	In Da House Vol. 5	September 14
2011	Winter Session 2011	February 1
2011	Summer Session 2011	May 24
2011	In Da House Vol. 6	August 29
2012	Winter Session 2012	February 21
2012	Summer Session 2012	June 19
2012	In Da House 2013	October 30
2013	Winter Session 2013	February 26
2013	Summer Session 2013	June 18
2013	In Da House 2014	October 29
2014	Pacha Ibiza	February 18

Year	Title	Release date
2014	Summer Session 2014	June 17
2014	In Da House 2015	October 27
2015	Winter Session 2015	February 17
2015	Summer Session 2015	June 9
2015	In Da House 2016	October 16
2016	Winter Session 2016	February 26
2016	Summer Session 2016	June 10
2016	In Da House 2017	November 4
2017	Summer Session 2017	June 23
2018	Winter Session 2018	March 23

== Artists ==
List of artists signed to D-Noy Muzik.

- Ben DJ
- Benji de la House
- Ben Simons
- CJ Stone
- Daniel Desnoyers
- Danni Rouge
- Danny Dove
- DJ M.E.G. and Timati
- DJs from Mars
- Felix Cartal
- Global Deejays
- Javi Mula
- Jean Elan
- Joachim Garraud
- Klaas
- Kurd Maverick
- Lady Alexandra T.
- Made in June
- Mathieu Bouthier
- Menini & Viani
- Mischa Daniels
- Molella
- Nari & Milani
- Neils Van Gogh
- Peakafeller
- Ricky Monaco
- Serebro
- Sophie Ellis Bextor
- Spankox
- Spankers
- Sunny Marleen
- The Cube Guys
- Tony Star
