= In Repair =

2000 song by Our Lady Peace

Single by Our Lady Peace

from the album Spiritual Machines
- Released: November 15, 2000
- Recorded: 2000, The Hit Factory (Avatar Studios), New York City
- Genre: Alternative rock, post-grunge, art rock
- Length: 4:14
- Label: Columbia
- Songwriter(s): Raine Maida; Ray Kurzweil (R.K. 2029)
- Producer(s): Arnold Lanni

Our Lady Peace singles chronology
"Thief" (2000)	"In Repair" (2000)	"Life" (2001)

Music video
- "In Repair" on YouTube

"In Repair" is a song by Canadian alternative rock group Our Lady Peace. It was released in November 2000 as the lead single from their fourth studio album Spiritual Machines.

== Content ==
Raine Maida stated that the lyrics "focus upon how people tend to treat each other as machines in our day-to-day life. We really need to take stock and focus our energy towards those in our lives that matter. Sometimes it seems as if we need an oil change."

The song, as with most songs from the Spiritual Machines album, follows a theme concerning a futuristic artificially intelligent and robotic society, as described in Ray Kurzweil's 1999 book The Age of Spiritual Machines. In both the original release of the song and its second release as part of OLP's A Decade compilation album in 2006, the song is immediately preceded by a track entitled "R.K. 2029", which is a narration from Kurzweil's book read aloud by Kurzweil himself.

== Critical reception ==
In her review of Spiritual Machines, Allmusic's MacKenzie Wilson commented that "Maida's lazy nasal-like vocals carry the song with sheer essence" and said that, "There are no thunderous riffs plaguing the song's initial plea for a little soul-searching."

== Music video ==
The music video was created by Oli Goldsmith and is an animated collage of the more than 200 artworks he painted for the Spiritual Machines project. The band makes no appearances in the video except for a brief moment when characters resembling them appear in the background. Saul Fox's image appears several times in the video also. The video premiered on Muchmusic on November 22, 2000.

In 2001, the video was nominated for Best Video, Best Rock Video, Best Post-Production, and Best Director at the MuchMusic Video Awards, which it won all but Best Rock Video.
