= Supersatellite =

Single by Our Lady Peace

from the album Naveed
- Released: February 6, 1995
- Recorded: 1994
- Genre: Alternative rock; grunge
- Length: 3:45 (album version)
- Label: Sony Music; Epic; Relativity
- Songwriter(s): Raine Maida
- Producer(s): Arnold Lanni

Our Lady Peace singles chronology
"Hope" (1994)	"Supersatellite" (1995)	"Naveed" (1995)

"Supersatellite" is a song by Canadian music group Our Lady Peace. It was the fourth single released from their debut album, Naveed in 1994. It is the only single released from Naveed without a music video.

== Meaning ==
"Supersatellite" was inspired by a book. Raine stated: "I believe that it's by Ken Carey, and is titled "You are the seed, the origin of much that is to come."
