= Clumsy (Our Lady Peace song) =

1997 single by Our Lady Peace

Single by Our Lady Peace

from the album Clumsy
- B-side: "Superman's Dead" (acoustic)
- Released: November 1997
- Length: 4:29
- Label: Epic
- Songwriters: Arnold Lanni; Raine Maida
- Producer: Arnold Lanni

Our Lady Peace singles chronology
"Superman's Dead" (1997)	"Clumsy" (1997)	"Automatic Flowers" (1997)

Music video
- "Clumsy" on YouTube

"Clumsy" is a song by Canadian alternative rock band Our Lady Peace. It was released in 1997 as the second single from their second album, Clumsy. The song is the band's most successful single in their native Canada, reaching number one on the RPM 100 Hit Tracks chart for three weeks. It is also one of their highest-charting singles in the United States, reaching number five on the Billboard Modern Rock Tracks chart and staying in the top 10 for 15 weeks. The song was ranked number one on CILQ-FM's Top 107 songs of 1997.

"Clumsy" has become a staple in Our Lady Peace's live setlist. A live version of the song is featured on their first live compilation Live released in 2003. The song was included on the soundtrack to the 1997 movie I Know What You Did Last Summer.

== Track listings ==
Canadian CD single and European CD1

1. "Clumsy" – 4:28
2. "Superman's Dead" (acoustic) – 4:09

European CD2

1. "Clumsy" – 4:28
2. "Clumsy" (power acoustic) – 4:00
3. "Superman's Dead" (acoustic) – 4:09

Australian CD single

1. "Clumsy"
2. "Let You Down"
3. "Starseed"
4. "Hope"

== Charts ==
=== Weekly charts ===
Chart (1997–1998)	Peak position
Canada Top Singles (RPM)	1
Canada Rock/Alternative (RPM)	2
US Radio Songs (Billboard)	59
US Alternative Airplay (Billboard)	5
US Mainstream Rock (Billboard)	13

=== Year-end charts ===
Chart (1997)	Position
Canada Top Singles (RPM)	14
Canada Rock/Alternative (RPM)	32

Chart (1998)	Position
Canada Top Singles (RPM)	93
US Mainstream Rock Tracks (Billboard)	38
US Modern Rock Tracks (Billboard)	12

== Release history ==
Region	Date	Format(s)	Label(s)	Ref.
Canada	1997	CD	Epic	
United States	November 17, 1997	Modern rock radio	Columbia	
United States	March 17, 1998	Contemporary hit radio	Columbia	
