= Naveed (song) =

Single by Our Lady Peace

from the album Naveed
- Released: 1995
- Genre: Post-grunge, alternative rock
- Length: 5:51
- Label: Sony Music, Epic, Relativity (US)
- Songwriter(s): Raine Maida

Our Lady Peace singles chronology
"Supersatellite" (1995)	"Naveed" (1995)	"Superman's Dead" (1997)

Music video
- "Naveed" on YouTube

Naveed is a single from Our Lady Peace's 1994 debut album of the same name. It was released in 1995 in the United States and in January 1996 in the United Kingdom as the fifth and final single from the album. The song performed well on the charts and became a hit in Canada. The music video also climbed the charts on MuchMusic and in 1998 was ranked the thirty-third favourite video of all time.

Since the album's release, Naveed has been a staple in the band's live performances. The song was also performed on Late Night with Conan O'Brien on June 27, 1995.

== Music video ==
The music video for Naveed, directed by George Vale, alternates between the band performing in front of a crowd and children playing in an overly brightened salvage yard meant to represent a war-torn country while dodging a prowling M4 Sherman tank and a menacing ventriloquist dummy, which was a recurring theme of the band's early videos. Imagery evoking Lord of the Flies is also used, with brief shots of a pig head on a pike and one of the children getting injured and presumably being left for dead by the others.

== Chart performance ==
Chart (1995)	Peak position
Canada Top Singles (RPM)	63
Canada Alternative (RPM)	4
US Active Rock (Radio & Records)	34
