= Oli Goldsmith =

Canadian artist

Oli Goldsmith (born 1979 in Toronto) is a Canadian artist whose best known work is for rock-band Our Lady Peace's 2000 album Spiritual Machines. Goldsmith currently lives and works with his wife Caroline Bacher, who works as an artist, sculptor and jeweller.

== Career ==
Goldsmith designed the original packaging for Spiritual Machines, as well as directing and animating the award-winning music video for the song In Repair from the album. The album packaging was nominated for a Juno Award for Best Album Artwork, while the video was nominated for Best Music Video. At the MuchMusic Video Awards, the video was nominated in six categories; winning awards for Best Post-production, Best Director and Best Video.

Oli defines his work as Pop Surrealism, yet has distinct views on the definition of the movement, clearly separating it from Lowbrow Art. He administers the Pop Surrealism group on Flickr where many artists working in the field congregate to display their work. Oli Goldsmith's art is exhibited internationally and represented in Canada by Michael Thomas Gallery in Port Hope, Gallery Jones in Vancouver and Parts Gallery Toronto.
