= Clumsy (Our Lady Peace album) =

Studio album by Our Lady Peace
- Released: January 23, 1997
- Recorded: February–September 1996
- Studio: Arnyard Studios (Toronto)
- Genres: Post-grunge; alternative rock
- Length: 45:43
- Label: Columbia
- Producer: Arnold Lanni

Our Lady Peace chronology
Naveed (1994)	Clumsy (1997)	Happiness... Is Not a Fish That You Can Catch (1999)

Singles from Clumsy
- 1. "Superman's Dead" Released: January 16, 1997; 2. "Clumsy" Released: April 9, 1997; 3. "Automatic Flowers" Released: July 14, 1997; 4. "4am" Released: December 2, 1997

Professional ratings
Review scores
Source	Rating
AllMusic	4/5 stars
AMZ	3.5/5 stars
Music Critic	4/5 stars
Sputnikmusic	4.5/5 stars
Sputnikmusic	3.5/5 stars

Clumsy is the second studio album by the Canadian rock band Our Lady Peace, released on January 23, 1997, by Columbia Records. The album is the band's most successful to date, achieving diamond status in Canada (1 million units sold) and strong sales in other countries, including platinum status in the U.S. for another 1 million sales. In 2007, it ranked No. 76 on "The Top 100 Canadian Albums" by Bob Mersereau and No. 33 on The Top 102 New Rock Albums of All Time by 102.1 The Edge (in 2009). The album features four hit singles: "Superman's Dead", "Automatic Flowers", "Clumsy", and "4am".

== Background ==
While on tour in support of Naveed the band attempted to begin writing for their next album. Like most bands, the challenges of writing a successful follow-up album was found to be difficult as each member now approached the writing process from a different set of experiences, personal goals, and influences from their time spent touring. Collaborations between band members and the co-writing producer broke down and writing sessions at the producer's studio resulted in nothing of use. The decision was made by frontman Raine Maida that the way to resolve the situation was to change the line-up, by dismissing either guitarist Mike Turner or bassist Chris Eacrett. Immediately following the band's opening stint with Van Halen, Maida's school friend, Duncan Coutts, was asked to join the band to be its new permanent bass player. "I don't want to call our old bass player Chris a weak link...I think he's a talented musician, just different from us," claimed Maida at the time of the announcement.

Creative tensions between Turner and the band would linger through the rest of the decade before coming to a head during the recording of their fifth album, 2002's Gravity, where they would finally part ways.

== Writing ==
As touring continued, the band began writing again with Duncan. One of the first songs they wrote was the eventual concert favorite "Trapeze", which they played live along with two other newly written songs "Home" and "Disgusted". "Disgusted" would evolve into "Spider Gun" and eventually became the track "Big Dumb Rocket". In December 1995 the band began intensive writing and demoing sessions in a rented rehearsal space. Despite coming up with several new ideas, the band found that writing while on tour was very difficult because they couldn't give the songs their undivided attention and most of their early ideas were scrapped because the band wasn't satisfied with them. "Trapeze" would make it to recording but the track was eventually cut and has yet to be released.

Pre-production for the album was set to begin in January 1996. Producer Arnold Lanni noticed the band's discontent with the songs they were writing. "I went down to see them and knew it wasn't happening", he recalled. "All their friends and family were calling them up. You sell that many records, you're on everybody's A-list, everybody blows sunshine up your butt and sometimes you believe the hype. We had to pull the plug on that scenario." At Lanni's suggestion, the band and him traveled to Duncan's rural lakeside cottage near Muskoka, Ontario, in order to concentrate on writing and recording demos for the album without distractions from family, friends or the media. While there, the band lived together in the cottage surrounded by instruments. A tape recorder was left on in the house all day to pick up any ideas being played. Lanni and the band members would usually play ice hockey in the afternoon and collaborate on songs in the evening and into the night. By the end of their stay, around 20 songs had been written. When they returned to the Toronto studio in February, according to Mike Turner, "When we came back to record, it just came together".

== Recording and production ==
Recording sessions for the yet untitled album began on February 8, 1996. The band was asked to record the Beatles song "Tomorrow Never Knows" for the soundtrack to the upcoming movie The Craft after several bands they had played with on tour knew them to play it well live. The song was recorded on the very first day of recording with Arnold Lanni and was mixed by Ralph Sall for the soundtrack. They then proceeded to pare down the twenty tracks they had written to the twelve they wanted to record. "The Story of 100 Aisles", originally called "Anacin", was the first song recorded and has a sound closer to Naveed than any other song on the album. "We just wanted to go in and give all these songs ideas their own life and play with them and rearrange them and all that until we're completely happy with it." said Duncan Coutts, "If they sound just like Naveed or if they don't, it wasn't a huge concern. We just wanted to make each song the best it could be."

The album was recorded in two parts. Five or six tracks were recorded and finished by April 1996 so the band could review them. These included the base tracks for "Clumsy", "Hello Oskar", "Carnival", "Shaking", "Let You Down" and "Sleeping In", which didn't make the album. The band's feedback directed the next set of songs recorded around June, which included "Superman's Dead" and a re-recording of "Hello Oscar". Raine Maida said in an interview, "We took a lot of time experimenting. The album was really done in three months. We took another two months to really go back over stuff and re-record. It's neat to look back and know the extra time we took was important to the record." Around this time (April), the working title of the album was Propeller, as Maida explained, "as in, that which causes forward movement." This was probably as a testament to the band's evolution since their debut album. Another working title was Trapeze, named after the song that didn't make the album. The cover art, featuring Saul Fox hanging on to a trapeze bar by his teeth, proves that this title came very close to being chosen. The name was changed to Clumsy in early September after the song of the same name. Recording wrapped up by the end of that month. The album was mastered at Gateway Studios in Portland, Maine, by Bob Ludwig.

== Style and themes ==
Raine stated that there was a kind of "Carnival atmosphere" to the whole album and that many of the lyrics he wrote were set at the circus or a carnival. Clumsy's songs feature the striking vocals of lead vocalist Raine Maida, who utilizes an often jarring falsetto technique, jumping from lower octaves in his vocal range to higher ones. Maida's vocals provide most of the melody of the songs, with guitars quieted down in this album compared to Naveed, their previous album. This aspect of singing has become the staple sound of the band, continuing with this fashion in their next studio album Happiness... Is Not a Fish That You Can Catch, and since lost on their 2005 album Healthy in Paranoid Times. In a January 1997 interview, the band stated that then new bassist Duncan Coutts, who also plays cello, keyboards and sings background vocals, influenced the sound on Clumsy even though he doesn't have any songwriting credits. He broadened the band's palette of sounds. Given those new parameters, the band couldn't help but change their sound.

== Release ==
In early 1996, Our Lady Peace's American label, Relativity Records, in a decision to switch to an urban format, eliminated ten label positions in their Rock category, including OLP. They moved to another Sony-owned label, Columbia Records for the release of Clumsy's first single in Canada, "Superman's Dead". Columbia would handle all of the band's releases in both Canada and the United States.

== Commercial performance ==
Clumsy debuted at #1 in Canada, selling 26,000 copies in Canada during its first week. It would go on to become Our Lady Peace's best-selling album, and was also the fourth best-selling album of 1997 in Canada. On February 28, 2001, the album was certified Diamond in Canada. On July 12, 2004, Clumsy was certified Platinum in the United States. Between 1996 and 2016, Clumsy was the best-selling album by a Canadian band in Canada and the eighth best-selling album by a Canadian artist overall in Canada.

Radio station Edge 102 (aka CFNY), listed Clumsy as the No. 1 album for 1997, based on sales, listener requests for songs and listener votes for the year's top album.

== Tours ==
Our Lady Peace toured in support of Clumsy from a month before the album's release in early 1997 and into 1998. The first leg of the tour, focusing on Canadian colleges, kicked off at Loyalist College in Belleville, Ontario, on January 13, 1997, where eight of the album's eleven tracks were premiered including "Superman's Dead", "4 AM" and others. This leg of the tour continued until March 1997, ending with a private music industry show at the Elbow Room in New York City.

The tour's second leg began on May 2, with the band playing two shows in Michigan before going off to Europe to promote the album's recent release there. The band returned and toured across the United States, only dipping into Canada to play at the very first Summersault festival. The North American tour continued until the end of September 1997 when Our Lady Peace joined Everclear as an opening act with whom they would tour until the end of 1997.

In January 1998, the band embarked on a 22-date headlining tour across Canada which included several shows opening for The Rolling Stones. On February 26, Our Lady Peace began their first headlining tour in the United States with Headswim and Black Lab opening. Following this they returned to Europe again for a 14-show tour across Belgium, the Netherlands, France and Germany. Further touring in the U.S. with Third Eye Blind and Eve 6 lasted into September 1998. The year of touring was concluded with the second Summersault festival being held. Our Lady Peace would spend the rest of the year working on their third studio album, Happiness... Is Not a Fish That You Can Catch.

=== Re-creation tour ===
In December 2009, the band announced that they would be "recreating" both Clumsy and their 2000 record Spiritual Machines by performing them live in their entireties throughout a new tour that began in March 2010; only nine months before the 10-year anniversary of the release of Spiritual Machines.

== Track listing ==
All tracks are written by Mike Turner, Raine Maida, Jeremy Taggart and Arnold Lanni. Words by Raine Maida.

No.	Title	Length
1.	"Superman's Dead"	4:16
2.	"Automatic Flowers"	4:05
3.	"Carnival"	4:48
4.	"Big Dumb Rocket"	4:23
5.	"4am"	4:17
6.	"Shaking"	3:37
7.	"Clumsy"	4:29
8.	"Hello Oskar"	3:03
9.	"Let You Down"	3:53
10.	"The Story of 100 Aisles"	3:45
11.	"Car Crash"	5:07
Total length:		45:43

European bonus disc (live at CBC Studios, Vancouver, April 25, 1997)
No.	Title	Length
1.	"Clumsy"	4:12
2.	"Naveed"	5:24
3.	"Automatic Flowers"	3:54

== Personnel ==
As listed in liner notes.

=== Musicians ===
- Raine Maida – vocals, acoustic guitar, piano
- Duncan Coutts – bass guitar
- Jeremy Taggart – drums, percussion
- Mike Turner – electric guitar

=== Production ===
- Angelo Caruso – additional engineering
- Arnold Lanni – production, engineering, mixing
- Bob Ludwig – mastering engineer
- Terrance Sawchuck – 2nd engineer

=== Artwork ===
- Sonia D'Aloisio – inside photos
- Helios – design, art direction, color retouch
- Neil Hodge – inside photos
- Catherine McRae – art direction
- Our Lady Peace – art direction, individual band photos
- Kevin Westenberg – cover and tray photo

== Charts ==
=== Weekly charts ===
Weekly chart performance for Clumsy by Our Lady Peace
Chart (1997–1998)	Peak position
Canada Top Albums/CDs (RPM)	1
US Billboard 200	76
US Heatseekers Albums (Billboard)	1

=== Year-end charts ===
Year-end chart performance for Clumsy
Chart (1997)	Position
Canada (Nielsen Soundscan)	4
Canadian Hard Rock Albums (Nielsen Soundscan)	1

Chart (1998)	Position
Canada Top Albums/CDs (RPM)	48

Chart (2002)	Position
Canadian Alternative Albums (Nielsen SoundScan)	166
Canadian Metal Albums (Nielsen SoundScan)	84

== Certifications ==
Region	Certification	Certified units/sales
Canada (Music Canada)	Diamond	1,000,000^{^}
United States (RIAA)	Platinum	1,000,000^{^}
^{^} Shipments figures based on certification alone.

== Release history ==
Region	Date	Label	Format	Catalog
Canada	January 23, 1997	Columbia	CD/CS	CK/T 80242
United States	April 8, 1997	Columbia	CD/CS	CK/T 67940
France	April 14, 1997	Epic	CD/CS	EPC 487408 2/4
Europe	September 29, 1997	Epic	CD/CS	EPC 487408 2/4
United States	December 20, 2016	Columbia/SRC Vinyl	LP	88875122161
Canada	2017	Columbia	LP	88985341031
Canada	May 4, 2018	Columbia/Music On Vinyl	LP	MOVLP2070
