= Superman's Dead =

Single by Our Lady Peace

from the album Clumsy
- Released: January 16, 1997
- Recorded: 1996
- Genre: Alternative rock
- Length: 4:16
- Label: Columbia
- Songwriters: Raine Maida; Mike Turner
- Producer: Arnold Lanni

Our Lady Peace singles chronology
"Naveed" (1995)	"Superman's Dead" (1997)	"Clumsy" (1997)

Music video
- "Superman's Dead" on YouTube

"Superman's Dead" is a song by Canadian alternative rock group Our Lady Peace. It was released on January 16, 1997 as the lead single from their second album Clumsy, preceding the album's release by a week. It has become one of Our Lady Peace's most popular songs.

The song has become the definitive example of Our Lady Peace's staple sound, highlighted by vocalist Raine Maida's unusual yet powerful falsetto. This song, in contrast to some others on the album, contains very heavy electric guitar, especially in comparison to tracks like "4 A.M." and "Carnival". It peaked at number 17 on the Canadian RPM Top Singles Chart while spending five weeks at number 2 on the RPM Alternative Chart. In the U.S., it peaked at number 11 on the Billboard Modern Rock Tracks chart, while reaching number 14 on the Mainstream Rock, making it one of their most successful songs in the U.S. Between 1995 and 2016, "Superman's Dead" was the 15th most played song by a Canadian artist on rock radio stations in Canada.

== Background and writing ==
Our Lady Peace producer Arnold Lanni recalls that late in the recording of Clumsy, he and the band were working on tracking a song called "Hello Oskar", when they decided to take a break for a few minutes.

"From the bathroom I heard Raine playing something on an acoustic guitar. When I came out I asked him what it was. He told me that it was just something he was toying around with. I really liked what he was doing so for the next day or so the band and I worked on developing what became 'Superman's Dead'." - Arnold Lanni

== Content ==
"Superman's Dead" was seen by the band as a dark statement on how much television kids watch and the content of it. It looks at the dark expectations that are garnered from media images:

An ordinary girl an ordinary waist
But ordinary's just not good enough today

Raine Maida stated, "I grew up with the old Superman, the black-and-white one. There was something so honest about it, and it's evolved into Beavis and Butt-Head". He also says of youthful TV pleasures, "Their images are defined by television: How they should think or what they should wear. It's kind of sad that way."

== Music videos ==
Three music videos have been made for this song: the Canadian version of a child (played by Ryan Dennis) trapped in the box, which was co-directed by George Vale and the band; the U.S. version which featured an unusual array of characters including clowns and goblins; and another U.S. version which simply showed the band playing the song. The original video was filmed in an abandoned warehouse in Toronto. That version premiered on MuchMusic on January 20, 1997. This version also won the award for "Favourite Video" at the 1997 MuchMusic Video Awards. In the U.S. versions, Raine Maida is shown playing the guitar in some parts, while in the original Canadian version he is not. The video peaked at number 1 (for three weeks) on the MuchMusic Video Countdown and finished as the number 2 video of the year on the channel.

== Live performances ==
The first performance of "Superman's Dead" took place on January 13, 1997 at Harbour Station in Saint John, New Brunswick, the first date of the Clumsy tour. Since then it has seldom been excluded from the band's live set. "Superman's Dead" was played live on the Conan O'Brien Show on October 1, 1997.

During concerts, when the song always pauses abruptly for the "Doesn't anybody ever know..." section, the band takes a slight pause, and the audience sings the outro. This can be heard in their live album Live (2003), and many other live concerts.

== Single releases ==
Canadian CD Single

1. "Superman's Dead" (Maida/Turner) 4:16
2. "Let You Down" (Maida) - 3:15
3. "Starseed" [Live] - 4:50

Acoustic Single

1. "Superman's Dead" [Acoustic] (Maida/Turner) - 5:12
2. "Innocent" [Acoustic] - 4:18

Austrian Single

1. "Superman's Dead" (Maida/Turner) - 4:16
2. "Let You Down" (Maida) - 3:15

US/GER Promo CD

1. "Superman's Dead" (Maida/Turner) - 4:16
2. "Car Crash" (Maida/Turner) - 5:07

French Single

1. "Superman's Dead" - 4:19
2. "Let You Down" - 3:52

United Kingdom Single

1. "Superman's Dead" - 4:19
2. "Let You Down" - 3:55
3. "Starseed" - 4:04

== Charts ==
Chart (1997)	Peak position
Canada Top Singles (RPM)	17
Canada Rock/Alternative (RPM)	2
US Radio Songs (Billboard)	74
US Alternative Airplay (Billboard)	11
US Mainstream Rock (Billboard)	14
