= Naveed (album) =

Studio album by Our Lady Peace
- Released: March 22, 1994 (Canada); March 21, 1995 (United States)
- Recorded: September 1993 – January 1994
- Studios: Arnyard Studios, Humber Summit, North York (now Toronto)
- Genres: Alternative rock; post-grunge; grunge; hard rock
- Length: 47:37
- Labels: Sony; Epic; Relativity
- Producer: Arnold Lanni

Our Lady Peace chronology
Demo (1992)	Naveed (1994)	Clumsy (1997)

Singles from Naveed
- 1. "The Birdman" Released: January 17, 1994; 2. "Starseed" Released: May 16, 1994; 3. "Hope" Released: October 10, 1994; 4. "Supersatellite" Released: February 6, 1995; 5. "Naveed" Released: August 4, 1995

Naveed is the debut studio album by Canadian rock band Our Lady Peace. It was produced by Arnold Lanni, and was released on March 22, 1994, by Sony Music Canada. Naveed became a success in Canada, being certified 4× Platinum in the country. There were five singles released for the album, including "The Birdman", "Starseed" and "Naveed". This is the only album to feature bass player Chris Eacrett, who was replaced by Duncan Coutts in 1995.

== Background ==
The band recorded several demo songs in January, 1992, including "Out of Here" and an early version of "The Birdman", at Arnyard Studios. They recorded another three-song demo in March in hopes of compiling a full album, "but we ran out of money after three songs" noted guitarist Mike Turner. "It was all self-financed, same old story. A friend of ours was going to CMJ, so we dubbed a few copies of what we had -- they didn't even have printed sleeves, just a phone number jotted on them -- and he passed those out. We started getting phone calls right away, and it was like, 'Well, maybe we ought to take this a little more seriously.

In September of that year, the band enlisted the help of Arnyard owner Arnold Lanni to oversee the recording of additional demo songs. At first they were unsure whether or not to choose Lanni to produce, only being familiar with his work with Frozen Ghost. The parties eventually hit it off on a personal level, the band admiring his brutal honesty about the music business. With him, they quickly composed 19 songs and recorded seven of them for label consideration. Three of the tracks were shopped around to labels by the band's new management team, Coalition Entertainment (co-owned by Lanni's brother Robert). The other four were sent to interested parties in early 1993. By April 1993, after hearing feedback from labels such as Geffen and Interscope, they had signed a record deal with Sony Music Canada. An offer by Sony's president Rick Camilleri "to make me a record that sounds like your demo", with no outside interference, appealed most to the band. According to Raine, "We were signed on faith that we could come up with more material like the demos but there was so much emotion and adrenalin flowing amongst us, I think we had ten more songs written inside a couple of weeks."

The title Naveed is taken from the Persian name for the "bearer of good news".

== Recording ==
Almost immediately after signing with Sony, the band entered pre-production to record their debut album. They rented rehearsal space in Mississauga, Ontario and from that spring through summer the band held day-long jam sessions with a cassette recorder. Lanni visited them each day to help with song arrangements. Raine made it clear to Lanni that he wanted to make a straightforward rock record. "I was really bullheaded on our first record ... I remember saying, we are a rock band, I don’t want to hear a piano or a synthesizer or even a tambourine."

With their demos finalized, the band entered Arnyard Studios in September 1993 to record the final 11 tracks. Prior to this, they had only played seven or so live shows together and only recently hired 18-year-old drummer Jeremy Taggart, whose high school graduation briefly postponed the recording of the album. Originally, they had planned to release their demo songs on an independent label and sell them at live shows but were instead rushed to the studio to record Naveed to capitalize on the positive vibe they felt playing together. "We hardly knew each other on a personal level," said Mike Turner, "but when we began working on a musical level the vibe was so great that we couldn't ignore it...the songs became our first initiative. Getting into the studio was the next step." Many of their demo songs would be re-recorded for the album.

The band described the recording sessions for Naveed as "a huge learning experience". Prior to recording, the band embraced a more primitive punk style with very simple chords and had limited technical experience in the studio. Mike Turner found that he lacked the technical proficiency to play the melodies and chord changes he heard in his head. "That was a problem," acknowledged Maida, "We really had to pull up our socks during the sessions -- we all got better in a hurry. Taggart used a Rogers Drums “Dynasonic” snare drum throughout the recording process, noted for its very loud and distinct sound on the album. " The band's desire for musical advancement and the help from veteran producer Lanni helped guide them through the process. For three months, the band lived together, recording at Arnyard Studios and laboring over song arrangements with minimal interference by Lanni, who would show up briefly to make suggestions. "When we got in the studio he was able to direct us on the equipment and how to use the room, but he never imposed anything". Bassist Chris Eacrett told the Ottawa Citizen in 1995, that "he always had suggestions but we made the final decisions." Every written song would be taken through multiple musical arrangements before being committed to tape. "There's nothing on the album we didn't want there," says Mike. "If we didn't feel a song suited the setting we'd created, it was dropped. We recorded this as an album. There is no filler." For unknown reasons, the last song "Neon Crossing" almost didn't make the final cut for the album, though according to a 2014 interview from Maida, he stated that he was “just never happy with the song”, and “lyrically it’s not finished in a way”. Another song that remains unreleased from this era, titled "One By One" was registered with the CMRAA.

Toward the very end of recording in January 1994, the band was given the opportunity to record a Neil Young song for an upcoming tribute album, and they quickly chose "The Needle and the Damage Done" before anyone else could. "That whole song fit the vibe of our record, and we recorded it at the tail end of our sessions. It just seemed to be the twelfth song," Raine Maida. The song would subsequently be issued as a 7" single sent to radio stations to promote Naveed in the United States and would later be included as a bonus track on imports of the band's 1999 release, Happiness...Is Not a Fish That You Can Catch.

== Release and reception ==
Professional ratings
Review scores
Source	Rating
AllMusic	3/5 stars
The Cincinnati Post	B+
Entertainment Weekly	B
Kerrang!	5/5 stars
Sputnikmusic	5/5

When Naveed was released in Canada in March 1994 it took a little while to pick up steam but eventually became very popular. The band's sound was compared to Led Zeppelin and was praised for sounding unique and original. By January 1997, Naveed had sold 250,000 units in the United States. As of 1998, Naveed had sold over 400,000 copies in Canada.

In the United States, advance copies of the album were sent to radio stations on December 6, 1994, in the form of a three track sampler. In releasing it in the States, Raine commented, "Even that was lucky. Initially, our U.S. label Relativity serviced it on cassette, and through an oversight forgot the 'Do Not Broadcast' title on the promotional copy. Radio stations were so hyped they started playing the cassette on the air. There was no information on the cassette about the band - just Our Lady Peace."

Upon its release in the United States one year later, Naveed was admired by critics and was received very well by fans who were aware of the song "Starseed". The rhythm section of the band, the diversity in the band member's musical backgrounds and Raine Maida's "hauntingly provocative" lyrics were all praised by critics. Many critics also believed the album could serve as the bridge between Grunge and the next big thing. Bob Remstein of the Los Angeles Village View noted how the album grooved "with insistent, seductive beats" and called the album "perhaps the best hard-rock album of the young year [1995]." Ken Wilson from The Cincinnati Post gave the album a B+, saying, "The impressive thing about this sassy debut effort is that Our Lady Peace members share equal parts in delivering this seductively hard and interesting set." Jennifer Crocker from Pitch Weekly in Kansas City, Missouri, called the album "damn good" and that "the compelling sound produced by this four man faction of musical ingenuity will wind you so tight, you'll spin on to track eleven with nary a notion of what's going on around you."

Tom Sinclair of Entertainment Weekly called the album overwrought and derivative but gave the album a rating of "B" saying that it "ought to leap onto the charts faster than a stage diver on steroids." Later on, MacKenzie Wilson of AllMusic called the album "a stunning debut" as well as "a decent introduction to the band's spirituality." She gave the album three out of five stars.

== Packaging and design ==
The band's logo on the album cover varies across the American, Canadian and European releases. The American version, released on the Relativity label, features a larger and bolder logo while on the Canadian version, 'Our Lady Peace' is displayed very small and in regular font with a brushed texture. The European release on the Epic label is the same as the Canadian version, but the band name is much larger. When re-released in the U.S. in 1997 by Columbia, the logo was slightly enlarged from the original U.S. release.

The album cover is the first of several to feature art model Saul Fox, who the band had met and befriended in 1993. On the cover, he is seen posing like a statue without a shirt and covered with pigeons, representing The Birdman. The rest of the packaging follows this theme. The photography was done by Andrew MacNaughtan.

Following the somewhat Middle-Eastern themes on the album, a line of Sanskrit writing, designed by Margo McPherson, that roughly translates into "Our Lady Peace" appears several times in the album's packaging. The word "Naveed" written in Persian (نوید) was also seen on Raine Maida's acoustic guitar throughout the subsequent tours and included in the music video for "Naveed."

== Style and themes ==
Naveed is considered one of the band's most raw and edgy works to date. One of the main characteristics of the band at this time was vocalist Raine Maida's extreme falsetto, and his ability to move relatively smoothly between high and low octaves with varying intensities. These vocals provided the overall melody juxtaposed with the heavy instruments. The tone of the album was darker and about more controversial topics than later releases.

Raine Maida provided the lyrics for the album. This introduced his trademark of ambiguous lyrics and "dark optimism" for which the band's music would come to be known. According to Raine in the band's first press release, "Naveed is a constant quest to obtain knowledge, possessed with the desire to grow mentally and spiritually. We have forced Naveed to travel the distance between mysticism and bitter reality."

Naveed kind of ties in all the lyrics. Naveed is a middle eastern name that stands for the bearer of good news, and a lot of the songs talk about strife and struggle, but it's more on a personal level for me. 'Naveed' talks about someone scared to die, but at the same time interested in it. - Raine Maida

A middle eastern theme is mildly detectable in some of the tracks, including the title track. Years later, Raine would suggest that in early mixes of these songs, the middle eastern vibe was even stronger but "we decided we had to pull back on it a bit. We realized we weren't knowledgeable enough, or steeped enough in that kind of music, to give it the treatment and respect that it deserves.".

Raine Maida noted that Our Lady Peace's seventh studio album Burn Burn, features music more similar in origin to that of Naveed than that of recent albums, though "a little mature".

== Track listing ==
All tracks are written by Arnold Lanni, Raine Maida, Mike Turner, and Chris Eacrett.

No.	Title	Length
1.	"The Birdman"	5:15
2.	"Supersatellite"	3:44
3.	"Starseed"	4:07
4.	"Hope"	5:15
5.	"Naveed"	5:51
6.	"Dirty Walls"	3:46
7.	"Denied"	5:00
8.	"Is It Safe?"	3:48
9.	"Julia"	3:59
10.	"Under Zenith"	3:45
11.	"Neon Crossing"	3:11
Total length:		47:37

== Personnel ==
As listed in liner notes

=== Musicians ===
- Chris Eacrett – bass guitar
- Raine Maida – vocals
- Jeremy Taggart – drums, percussion
- Mike Turner – electric guitar
- Phil X – guitar solo on "Denied"

=== Production ===
- Ted Jensen – mastering engineer
- Arnold Lanni – production and engineering
- Terrance Lee – assistant engineer

== Non-album tracks ==
1. "Julia" (Live Piano Version) - never released, available on internet, arranged by Sarah Slean.

=== 1992 Demos ===
Demo 1 (January 1992)

1. "The Birdman"
2. "Out of Here"
3. [Unknown]

Demo 2 (March 1992)

1. "Personal Parade"
2. "Edge of Sanity"
3. "Neon Crossing"

Demo 3 (September 1992)

1. "Nobody's Wrong"
  - lyrics re-written and name changed to "The Birdman" to make the Naveed version. Studio version available on internet.
2. "Blind Anniversary"
3. "Sorry"
  - no relation to the Gravity song. Studio version available on internet.
4. "Julia"

Demo 4 (September 1992)

1. "Supersatellite"
2. "Denied"
3. "Neon Crossing"

== Charts ==
Chart (1995)	Peak position
Canada Top Albums/CDs (RPM)	12

== Certifications ==
Region	Certification	Certified units/sales
Canada (Music Canada)	4× Platinum	400,000^{^}
^{^} Shipments figures based on certification alone.

== Release history ==
Region	Date	Label	Format	Catalog
Canada	March 22, 1994	Epic	CD/CS	EK/T 80191
United States	March 21, 1995	Relativity	CD/CS	88561-1507-2/4
United States	June 3, 1997	Columbia (reissue)	CD/CS	CK/T 68170
Canada	October 7, 2016	Epic	LP	88985341041
Europe	May 5, 2017	Epic/Music On Vinyl	LP	MOVLP1877
