= Hope (Our Lady Peace song) =

Single by Our Lady Peace

from the album Naveed
- Released: October 10, 1994
- Recorded: 1994
- Length: 5:15; 4:20 (radio edit)
- Label: Sony; Epic; Relativity; (US)
- Songwriter(s): Raine Maida
- Producer(s): Arnold Lanni

Our Lady Peace singles chronology
"Starseed" (1994)	"Hope" (1994)	"Supersatellite" (1995)

"Hope" is a song by Canadian rock band Our Lady Peace. It was the third single released from their debut 1994 album, Naveed.

== Origin ==
When first being recorded, the song was titled "Sunflower" and had a psychedelic style, and, according to Jeremy Taggart, a Police vibe out of the bridge.

== Music video ==
The music video for the song shows the band playing in a smoky bar. It switches back and forth to a woman in a sunflower field who seems lost. It shows her and another man doing various unusual things.
