= 4am (Our Lady Peace song) =

Single by Our Lady Peace

from the album Clumsy
- Released: December 2, 1997
- Recorded: 1996
- Genre: Alternative rock, post-grunge
- Length: 3:30 (radio edit); 4:17 (album version)
- Label: Columbia
- Songwriters: Raine Maida, Arnold Lanni
- Producer: Arnold Lanni

Our Lady Peace singles chronology
"Automatic Flowers" (1997)	"4am" (1997)	"One Man Army" (1999)

Music video
- "4am" on YouTube

"4am" is a song by Canadian alternative rock band Our Lady Peace, released in December 1997 as the fourth single from their second album Clumsy. The band has described the title of the song as having a double meaning, which has resonated with many of their fans; not only did the band write the entire song at 4 am one morning, but lead vocalist Raine Maida also confessed that the song was triggered by a dream about his relationship with his father Anthony, as Raine doubted Anthony would support his musical career. The song has a steady upbeat tempo throughout, with poetic lyrics.

== Critical reception ==
"4am" made the band very popular in North America and ultimately helped them win two Juno Awards. It also helped propel the song's parent album Clumsy to platinum status. The song was reviewed negatively by Billboard Magazine who said, "To warrant a snail-paced tempo, a song should ideally deliver pleasing vocals or poetic lyrics, and this overwrought ballad by Our Lady Peace unfortunately does neither."

== Music video ==
The music video was directed by Tony Pantages and was filmed in Los Angeles during El Niño. In the video, the band is shown riding in a black 1958 Cadillac Series 75 limousine. There is also an edited version of the video made for airing in the U.S. The edited version is similar to the original, except it is shorter and features different camera shots at different times than the original. For example, in the original, Maida sings the majority of the song in the car, while in the edited version, he sings mostly on an empty street.

== Track listing ==
=== US promo single ===
CSK 41071

1. "Radio Edit" – 3:30
2. "Album Version" – 4:15
3. "Callout Hook #1" – :10
4. "Callout Hook #2" – :05

== Chart performance ==
Chart (1997–98)	Peak position
Canada Top Singles (RPM)	29
Canada Alternative Top 30 (RPM)	8
US Billboard Modern Rock Tracks	31
US Billboard Mainstream Rock Tracks	38
