= Canadian Independent Record Production Association =

The Canadian Independent Record Production Association (CIRPA) is an organisation representing the independent sector of the Canadian music and sound industry. It was established on 20 January 1971.

The organization has organized group participation of its member labels and distributors in trade shows, including France's MIDEM. Peterson acted as the company's president for many years.

== Members ==
=== Record labels ===
- 306 Records
- 604 Records
- A L'infini Communications
- A-B-A-C-A Entertainment Group / A-B-A-C-A Records
- A/R Group International
- Adagio Music Inc
- Alma Records
- Anthem Entertainment Group
- Aporia Records
- Arbor Records Ltd.
- Arts & Crafts Productions
- Attack Media Group
- Awesome Music Inc
- Balanced Records Inc.
- Bijou Records
- Bongo Beat Records
- Borealis Recording Co.
- Bumstead Records
- Camobear Records
- Canadian Music Centre/Centrediscs
- Casablanca Media Acquisitions Inc.
- CBC Records
- Chacra Music Licensing Inc.
- Children's Group Inc., The
- Chronograph Records
- Coalition Entertainment (Records) Inc. / Coalition Entertainment (Publishing) Inc.
- Cold Rawk Records
- Cordova Bay Entertainment Group
- Costa Music Inc.
- CP Records
- Curve Music
- D-Noy Muzik
- Déjà Musique
- Delinquent Records
- Dine Alone Music Inc.
- Distort Entertainment
- Donald K Donald Group of Labels
- Duke Street Records
- endearing Records
- Equator Music
- File Under: Music
- Hennie Bekker Music Inc.
- Hollywood North Records
- Jordan Music
- Justin Time Records Inc.
- Kelp Records
- Kindling Music Inc.
- LAFAB Musique
- Last Gang Records
- Linus Entertainment Inc.
- MapleCore Ltd. (MapleMusic)
- Marquis Records
- Mary Lambert Productions
- Micah Communications
- Mint Records
- Moon Tan Music
- Nettwerk Productions
- Ninja Tune
- Northern Blues Music Inc.
- Opening Day Entertainment Group
- Outside Music
- Pacemaker Entertainment
- Paper Bag Records
- Peermusic Canada Inc.
- Pheromone Recordings
- Quinlan Road Productions
- Roadrunner Records
- Rock Empire, The
- Royalty Records Inc.
- Saved By Radio
- Secret Weapon Records
- Six Shooter Records
- Sleeping Giant Music
- Smallman Records
- Somerset Entertainment
- Sonic Records Ltd.
- Sonic Unyon Records
- Soul Kiss Entertainment
- Sparks Music
- SPG Music Ltd.
- Sphere/One Eyed Duck Records & Publishing
- Stony Plain Recording Company Ltd.
- Sunshine Records
- Tandem.mu
- True North Records
- Upper Class Recordings
- Urbnet Communications
- weewerk
- White Eagle Music Promotions / White Eagle Records
- WIDEawake Entertainment Group
- Wild Whip Records
- Wildhorse Records
- Wychwood Park Productions Inc.

=== Records producers ===
- A/R Group International
- Adagio Music Inc
- Alma Records
- AMPLUS Productions
- Attack Media Group
- Fire Escape Recording
- Jordan Music
- Mary Lambert Productions
- Moon Tan Music
- Rising Sun Productions
- Tandem.mu
- White Eagle Music Promotions / White Eagle Records
- WIDEawake Entertainment Group
- Wildhorse Records
- Wychwood Park Productions Inc.

=== Record Distributors ===
- 306 Records
- Canadian Music Centre/Centrediscs
- Chacra Music Licensing Inc.
- Festival Distribution
- Hennie Bekker Music Inc.
- Justin Time Records Inc.
- KOCH Entertainment
- Outside Music
- Royalty Records Inc.
- Somerset Entertainment
- Sonic Unyon Records
- Soul Kiss Entertainment
- Themes & Variations
- Urbnet Communications
