= Raw and Rare (Harem Scarem album) =

Double DVD package by Canadian band Harem Scarem

Video by Harem Scarem
- Released: April 1, 2008
- Recorded: Firefest IV at Rock City, Nottingham, UK, October 27, 2007; Ajax, Ontario, Canada, 1994
- Genre: Hard rock
- Label: Vespa Music Group

Harem Scarem chronology
Live at the Gods 2002 (2002)	Raw and Rare (2008)

Raw & Rare

Live album by Harem Scarem
- Released: April 1, 2008
- Recorded: Firefest IV, October 27, 2007
- Genre: Hard rock
- Length: 51:29
- Label: Vespa Music Group
- Producer: Harry Hess

Harem Scarem chronology
Human Nature (2006)	Raw & Rare (2008)	Melodic Rock EP (2008)

Raw and Rare is a double DVD package released by the Canadian hard rock band Harem Scarem in 2008. It was recorded live at the Firefest IV festival held at Rock City in Nottingham and consists of the final Harem Scarem live performance before their disbandment. The second DVD contains live clips from the Mood Swings tour of 1994 recorded in Canada. A limited edition of Raw and Rare featured also a bonus audio CD with the live performance of 2007.

== Track listings ==
DVD 1- Live at Firefest IV (2007)

1. "Dagger"
2. "Human Nature"
3. "Caught Up in Your World"
4. "The Paint Thins"
5. "With a Little Love"
6. "Killing Me"
7. "If There Was a Time"
8. "Don't Come Easy"
9. "Voice of Reason"
10. "No Justice"
11. "Karma Cleansing"

DVD 2- 1994 Mood Swings Tour clips and 1997 European Tour clips

1. "Saviors Never Cry" (live 94)
2. "Empty Promises" (live 94)
3. "Slowly Slipping Away" (live 94)
4. "Sentimental BLVD." (live 94)
5. "If There Was a Time" (live 94)
6. "Mandy" (live 94)
7. "No Justice" (live 94)
8. "Distant Memory" (live 94)
9. "Honestly" (live 94)
10. "Stranger Than Love" (live 94)
11. "Guitar Solo" (live 94)
12. "Had Enough" (live 94)
13. "All Over Again" (video clip)
14. "Guitar Solo" (video clip)
15. Recording vocals for "Slowly Slipping Away"
16. Mixing acoustic tracks
17. "Darren"
18. "Turn Around" (live 97 clip)
19. "It's Gotta Be" (live 97 clip)
20. "Headache" (live 97 clip)
21. "Climb the Gate" (live 97 clip)

Bonus audio CD

All tracks are written by Harry Hess and Pete Lesperance

No.	Title	Length
1.	"Dagger"	5:24
2.	"Human Nature"	4:13
3.	"Caught Up in Your World"	4:29
4.	"The Paint Thins"	4:49
5.	"With a Little Love"	4:07
6.	"Killing Me"	3:46
7.	"If There Was a Time"	3:52
8.	"Don't Come Easy"	4:12
9.	"Voice of Reason"	4:52
10.	"No Justice"	6:20
11.	"Karma Cleansing"	5:35

== Band members ==
- Harry Hess - lead vocals, guitar, producer
- Pete Lesperance - lead guitar, backing vocals, producer
- Barry Donaghy - bass, backing vocals
- Creighton Doane - drums, backing vocals

1994 live show

- Mike Gionet – bass, backing vocals
- Darren Smith – drums, backing vocals
