= Last Live =

Live album by Harem Scarem
- Released: August 21, 2000
- Genre: Hard rock
- Length: 58:54
- Label: WEA
- Producers: Harry Hess and Pete Lesperance

Harem Scarem chronology
Rubber (1999)	Last Live (2000)	Rocks (2001)

Last Live is a live album released by the hard rock band Harem Scarem, recorded during the band's first tour of Japan under the name Rubber. In addition to the live tracks, nine of which were renditions of songs from Rubber, Last Live includes two studio recordings. It was originally released only in Japan in 2000 before being reissued domestically by Wounded Bird Records in 2010.

== Track listing ==
All tracks are written by Harry Hess and Pete Lesperance, except "Trip" by Lesperance and "Another Nail in My Heart" by Chris Difford, Glenn Tilbrook.

No.	Title	Length
1.	"Stuck with You"	3:41
2.	"Turn Around"	2:23
3.	"It's Gotta Be"	3:48
4.	"Headache"	2:56
5.	"Coming Down"	3:41
6.	"Climb the Gate"	4:26
7.	"Sunshine"	4:30
8.	"Without You"	4:26
9.	"Pool Party"	5:04
10.	"Trip"	5:00
11.	"Face It"	3:56
12.	"Who-Buddy"	3:44
13.	"So Blind"	4:15
14.	"Lauralie" (bonus studio track)	4:23
15.	"Another Nail in My Heart" (bonus studio track, Squeeze cover)	2:41

== Band members ==
- Harry Hess - lead vocals, guitar, producer.
- Pete Lesperance - lead guitar, backing vocals, producer.
- Barry Donaghy - bass, backing vocals.
- Creighton Doane - drums, backing vocals.
