= Live at the Gods 2002 =

Live album by Harem Scarem

Video by Harem Scarem
- Released: 9 December 2002
- Recorded: at Pennington's, Bradford, England
- Genre: Hard rock
- Length: 80 min.
- Label: Frontiers (Europe); Marquee/Avalon (Japan); Bullseye (Canada)
- Producer: Claire Swan, Simon Bennett

Harem Scarem chronology
Video Hits & More (1998)	Live at the Gods 2002 (2002)	Raw and Rare (2008)

Live at the Gods 2002

Live album by Harem Scarem
- Released: 9 December 2002
- Recorded: at Pennington's, Bradford, England
- Genre: Hard rock
- Length: 66:34
- Label: Frontiers (Europe); Marquee/Avalon (Japan); Bullseye (Canada)
- Producer: Harry Hess

Harem Scarem chronology
Weight of the World (2002)	Live at the Gods 2002 (2002)	The Early Years (2003)

Live at the Gods 2002 is a live video album released by the hard rock band Harem Scarem, issued in Europe and Japan in 2002. The album was also released as a live CD. In Canada the DVD and CD were published in May 2004 under the name Rubber.

== Track listing ==
No.	Title	Writer(s)	Length
1.	"Change Comes Around"	Harry Hess, Pete Lesperance	5:30
2.	"Killing Me"	Hess, Lesperance	3:23
3.	"Stuck with You"	Hess, Lesperance	4:05
4.	"Hard to Love"	Christopher Ward, Hess, Lesperance	4:27
5.	"Who-Buddy"	Hess, Lesperance	4:08
6.	"You Ruined Everything"	Hess, Lesperance	3:41
7.	"This Ain't Over"	Hess	4:53
8.	"See Saw"	Lesperance	2:58
9.	"If You"	Hess, Lesperance	3:29
10.	"Warming a Frozen Rose"	Hess, Lesperance	5:35
11.	"How Long"	Hess, Lesperance, Dean McTaggart	4:39
12.	"Honestly"	Hess	4:36
13.	"Outside Your Window"	Hess, Lesperance	5:09
14.	"So Blind"	Hess, Lesperance	4:07
15.	"The Paint Thins"	Hess, Lesperance	5:46
16.	"No Justice"	Hess, Lesperance	5:08

== Band members ==
- Harry Hess - lead vocals, guitar, producer.
- Pete Lesperance - lead guitar, backing vocals, producer.
- Barry Donaghy - bass, backing vocals.
- Creighton Doane - drums, backing vocals.
