= Wounded Bird Records =

- Founded: 1998
- Genre: Various
- Country of origin: U.S.
- Location: Guilderland, New York
- Official website: woundedbird.com

Wounded Bird Records is an American compact disc only re-issue record label that was founded in 1998 in Guilderland, New York.

They re-release lesser known albums from popular and lesser known artists. Most of the Wounded Bird catalogue is licensed from Warner Music Group (including Atlantic Records) and Sony Music Entertainment.

== Notable artists released ==
- Ace Spectrum
- A Foot in Coldwater
- Agent Orange
- Toshiko Akiyoshi
- Jan Akkerman
- Joe Albany
- Alessi Brothers
- Steve Allen
- Phil Alvin
- Amazing Rhythm Aces
- Ambrosia
- David Amram
- Jon Anderson
- Apollonia
- April Wine
- Argent
- Horacee Arnold
- Ashford & Simpson
- Tony Ashton and Jon Lord
- The Assembled Multitude
- Brian Auger
- Patti Austin
- Axe
- Aztec Camera
- Randy Bachman
- Back Street Crawler
- Bad Company
- Badfinger
- Badger
- Ginger Baker
- John Baldry
- The Bangles
- Barnaby Bye
- Barrabás
- Bobby Barth
- Count Basie
- Baton Rouge
- Bay City Rollers
- Beggars & Thieves
- Harry Belafonte
- Adrian Belew
- Delia Bell
- Belle Epoque
- George Benson
- Jan Berry
- Stephen Bishop
- Blackfoot
- Black Heat
- Black Oak Arkansas
- Black Pearl
- Ruben Blades
- The Blasters
- Blood, Sweat & Tears
- David Blue
- Blue Mountain Eagle
- The Blues Brothers
- B-Movie
- Bo Grumpus
- Bob & Ray
- Bonaroo (band)
- Booker T. & The MG's
- Boulder
- Terence Boylan
- Ruby Braff
- Laura Branigan
- Brave Belt
- Bread
- Lenny Breau
- Brick
- The Brides of Funkenstein
- Brilliant
- Britny Fox
- David Bromberg
- Albert Brooks
- Mel Brooks
- Danny Joe Brown
- Jocelyn Brown
- Brownsville Station
- Dave Brubeck
- Peabo Bryson
- Roy Buchanan
- Roger Daltrey
- BulletBoys
- Hiram Bullock
- Kenny Burrell
- Gary Burton
- Jenny Burton
- The Bus Boys
- Paul Butterfield
- Butterfield Blues Band
- Charlie Byrd
- Donald Byrd
- The Byrds
- Cactus
- Jonathan Cain
- John Cale
- The Call
- Cab Calloway
- Jim Capaldi
- Irene Cara
- Carillo
- Larry Carlton
- Pete Carr
- Carlene Carter
- Lynda Carter
- Ron Carter
- Cate Brothers
- Phillip Catherine
- Felix Cavaliere
- Peter Cetera
- Change
- Harry Chapin
- Blondie Chaplin
- Chase
- Boozoo Chavis
- Cheap Trick
- Cher
- Don Cherry
- Chic
- Eric Clapton
- Petula Clark
- Allan Clarke
- Stanley Clarke
- Clefs of Lavender Hill
- Jimmy Cliff
- Rosemary Clooney
- Billy Cobham
- Joe Cocker
- Jude Cole
- Paul Collins' Beat
- Alice Coltrane
- Commander Cody and His Lost Planet Airmen
- Compost
- Don Cooper
- Chick Corea
- Larry Coryell
- Bill Cosby
- Couchois
- Country Joe & The Fish
- Randy Crawford
- Crawler
- Crazy Horse
- Marshall Crenshaw
- Cross Country
- D.A.D.
- Dada
- Roger Daltrey
- Charlie Daniels
- Dave Davies
- Jesse Ed Davis
- Paul Davis
- Deodato
- The Del Fuegos
- Delaney & Bonnie
- John Denver
- Rick Derringer
- Jackie DeShannon
- Detective
- Buck Dharma
- The Dickies
- The Dictators
- Al Di Meola
- Dino, Desi & Billy
- Dr. John
- Thomas Dolby
- Klaus Doldinger
- Danny Douma
- The Dregs
- The Dream Academy
- Les Dudek
- George Duke
- The Dukes
- Cornell Dupree
- Robbie Dupree
- Earth Opera
- Elliot Easton
- EBN-OZN
- Eddie & the Tide
- Dave Edmunds
- Bernard Edwards
- Jonathan Edwards
- Electric Angels
- Electric Flag
- Duke Ellington
- Don Ellis
- Herb Ellis & Charlie Byrd
- England Dan & John Ford Coley
- Enuff Z'Nuff
- Envy
- Juan Garcia Esquivel
- David Essex
- Kevin Eubanks
- Europe
- Eugenius
- Phil Everly
- Eye to Eye
- Face to Face
- Fandango
- Mark Farner
- Farquahr
- Joe Farrell
- Farrenheit
- Faster Pussycat
- Fatback
- Don Felder
- José Feliciano
- Michael Fennelly
- Maynard Ferguson
- 54-40
- Figures on a Beach
- Mike Finnigan
- Fiona
- Firefall
- Fire Town
- Michele Fischietti
- Flatt & Scruggs
- Mick Fleetwood
- Flint
- Fludd
- Foghat
- Ellen Foley
- Robben Ford
- Sonny Fortune
- Fotomaker
- Samantha Fox
- Aretha Franklin
- Chico Freeman
- Ace Frehley
- Frehley's Comet
- The Frost
- The Fugs
- Richie Furay
- Eric Gale
- Gamma
- Gang of Four
- David Gates
- Danny Gatton
- Bob Geldof
- Debbie Gibson
- Louise Goffin
- Jerry Goodman
- GoodThunder
- Dexter Gordon
- Larry Graham
- Lou Gramm
- Grand Funk Railroad
- Stephane Grappelli
- Great Buildings
- Green on Red
- Greenslade
- Grinderswitch
- David Grisman
- Steve Grossman
- Guadalcanal Diary
- Vince Guaraldi
- Gunhill Road
- John Hall
- Tom T. Hall
- Hall & Oates
- Jan Hammer
- Peter Hammill
- Roland Hanna
- Herbie Hancock
- The Happenings
- Harem Scarem
- Rufus Harley
- Don Harrison Band
- Noel Harrison
- Deborah Harry
- Lisa Hartman
- Gordon Haskell
- Richie Havens
- Ronnie Hawkins
- Bonnie Hayes (& The Wild Combo)
- Lee Hazlewood
- Heads Hands & Feet
- Headpins
- Hellion
- Joe Henderson
- Scott Henderson
- Woody Herman
- Dan Hicks
- Highway Chile
- Chris Hillman
- Robyn Hitchcock
- The Hollies
- Holly and the Italians
- Holy Modal Rounders
- Honeymoon Suite
- Paul Horn
- Horslips
- Hot Tuna
- Steve Howe
- Freddie Hubbard
- Ray Wylie Hubbard (and The Cowboy Twinkies)
- Alberta Hunter
- Steve Hunter
- Icon
- Idle Eyes
- Incredible String Band
- James Ingram
- Iron Butterfly
- Peter Ivers
- Debora Iyall
- Chris Jagger
- James Gang
- Keith Jarrett
- The J. Geils Band
- Jo Jo Gunne
- Eric Johnson
- Alphonso Johnson
- Michael Johnson
- Tom Johnston
- Elvin Jones
- Howard Jones
- Clifford Jordan
- The Judybats
- Jules and the Polar Bears
- Michael Kamen
- Peter Kaukonen
- Keep It Dark
- Kensington Market
- Robin Kenyatta
- Doug Kershaw
- Bobby Keys
- Steve Khan
- Kick Axe
- Kid Creole and the Coconuts
- Carole King
- Jonathan King
- King Curtis
- King's X
- Kissing the Pink
- Kix
- John Klemmer
- Earl Klugh
- John Koerner
- Alexis Korner
- Danny Kortchmar
- Kris Kristofferson
- Kris Kristofferson and Willie Nelson
- Joachim Kühn
- Labelle
- The Ladder
- L.A. Express
- Lamb
- Nicolette Larson
- Yusef Lateef
- Stacy Lattisaw
- Hubert Laws
- Lazarus
- Leader of the Pack
- Bernie Leadon
- Geddy Lee
- Peggy Lee
- Jerry Lee Lewis
- Mingo Lewis
- Ramsey Lewis
- Gordon Lightfoot
- Lighthouse
- David Lindley
- Little Feat
- Lobo
- Dave Loggins
- Loggins and Messina
- Kenny Loggins
- Looking Glass
- Trini Lopez
- Jeff Lorber
- Lord Sutch
- Loudness
- Louisiana Red
- Love (band)
- Lovecraft
- Lulu
- George Lynch
- Phil Lynott
- Jack Mack and the Heart Attack
- Lonnie Mack
- Jakob Magnusson
- Taj Mahal
- Mahavishnu Orchestra
- Malice
- Mama's Pride
- Melissa Manchester
- Henry Mancini
- Mandala
- Howie Mandel
- Manhattan Transfer
- Herbie Mann
- Arif Mardin
- Charlie Mariano
- Wynton Marsalis
- Eric Martin Band
- Marilyn Martin
- Steve Martin
- The Masked Marauders
- Mason Proffit
- Johnny Mathis
- Matrix
- Paul McCandless
- Les McCann
- Jay McShann
- John McEuen
- John McLaughlin
- Meat Loaf
- Randy Meisner
- Melanie Safka
- Memphis Slim
- Jim Messina
- The Mighty Lemon Drops
- Mighty Sparrow
- Barry Miles
- Buddy Miles
- Glenn Miller
- Ministry
- Mink DeVille
- Mr. Big
- Kim Mitchell
- Modern English
- Modern Jazz Quartet
- Modern Romance
- Molly Hatchet
- Modern English
- Mondo Rock
- Montrose
- Ronnie Montrose
- Glen Moore
- Gayle Moran
- More
- Airto Moreira
- The Steve Morse Band
- Bob Mosley
- Mother Earth
- Mother's Finest
- Mott the Hoople
- Rob Mounsey
- Mountain
- Alphonse Mouzon
- Idris Muhammad
- Geoff Muldaur
- Maria Muldaur
- Michael Martin Murphey
- Jim Nabors
- Nantucket
- Fred Neil
- Tracy Nelson
- Neon Philharmonic
- Nervous Eaters
- The New Cactus Band
- New England
- New Riders of the Purple Sage
- The New Seekers
- David "Fathead" Newman
- Newport Jazz Festival All Stars
- Juice Newton
- Nitty Gritty Dirt Band
- Jack Nitzsche
- Tom Northcott
- Aldo Nova
- NRBQ
- Mark O'Connor
- Ohio Express
- Danny O'Keefe
- One to One
- Oregon
- Benjamin Orr
- Johnny Otis
- Outlaws
- Overkill
- Buck Owens
- Pacific Gas & Electric
- David Pack
- Painter
- Pandoras
- Mica Paris
- Graham Parker
- Passport
- Jaco Pastorius
- Robbie Patton
- Henry Paul Band
- Peaches and Herb
- Pearls Before Swine
- Jim Pepper
- Petra
- Shawn Phillips
- Pieces of a Dream
- Dave Pike
- Mary Kay Place
- Plasticland
- Poco
- Point Blank
- The Pointer Sisters
- Polyrock
- Jean-Luc Ponty
- Bud Powell
- Roger Powell
- Private Life
- Prophet
- Pure Prairie League
- Flora Purim
- Quill
- Quiver
- Eddie Rabbitt
- Ramatam
- Boots Randolph
- Rank and File
- Kenny Rankin
- Tom Rapp
- Raven
- Dave Ray
- Pat Rebillot
- Redbone
- Red Rockers
- Renaissance
- Buddy Rich
- Riggs
- Terry Riley
- Lee Ritenour
- Rocket 88
- The Rockets
- Jimmie Rodgers
- Nile Rodgers
- Red Rodney with Ira Sullivan
- Gregg Rolie
- Romeo Void
- Root Boy Slim
- Rose Royce
- Rough Cutt
- Rubber (A.K.A. Harem Scarem)
- The Rubinoos
- Tom Rush
- Patrice Rushen
- Leon Russell
- Sabicas
- Doug Sahm
- Saigon Kick
- David Sanborn
- David Sancious
- Peter Schilling
- Timothy B. Schmit
- Neal Schon & Jan Hammer
- Marilyn Scott
- Tom Scott
- The Screaming Blue Messiahs
- Earl Scruggs
- Dan Seals
- Seals and Crofts
- The Searchers
- Seatrain
- The Section
- Neil Sedaka
- Pete Seeger
- Michael Sembello
- Doc Severinsen (with Henry Mancini)
- Sha Na Na
- Shadow King
- Woody Shaw
- Shaw Blades
- Show of Hands
- Janis Siegel
- Siegel–Schwall Band
- Patrick Simmons
- Sinceros
- Sister Sledge
- Sixwire
- Sleeze Beez
- Sly & The Family Stone
- Small Faces
- Smashed Gladys
- Jimmy Smith
- Rex Smith
- Steve Smith
- Phoebe Snow
- Sons of Angels
- The Soup Dragons
- JD Souther
- Souther, Hillman, Furay Band
- Southern Pacific
- Sparks
- Jeremy Spencer
- SPK
- Rick Springfield
- Squeeze
- Chris Squire
- Stalk-Forrest Group
- Starpoint
- The Statler Brothers
- Candi Staton
- Steps Ahead
- Mike Stern
- Gary Stewart
- Sandy Stewart
- The Stooges
- Streets
- Stuff
- Sugarfoot
- Ira Sullivan
- Sweetwater
- Sylvain Sylvain
- The System
- Tangerine Dream
- Tangier
- Marc Tanner Band
- Kate Taylor
- Teegarden & Van Winkle
- Sonny Terry & Brownie McGhee
- Thin Lizzy
- Mickey Thomas
- Linda Thompson
- Billy Thorpe
- Three Man Army
- Throwing Muses
- Thunder
- Pam Tillis
- Julie Tippetts
- George Tipton
- TNT
- Tomita
- Translator
- Trapeze
- Trash
- Treasure
- Tribal Tech
- Roger Troutman
- Robin Trower
- Tuff Darts
- Joe Lynn Turner
- Stanley Turrentine
- 24-7 Spyz
- McCoy Tyner
- Twennynine with Lenny White
- James Blood Ulmer
- Undisputed Truth
- Until December
- Urban Verbs
- Michael Urbaniak
- Ritchie Valens
- Vandenberg
- Vanilla Fudge
- Johnny Van Zant
- Edgar Varese
- Alan Vega
- Martha Veléz
- Tom Verlaine
- Vicious Rumors
- Vinegar Joe
- Virginia Wolf
- Vital Information
- Joe Vitale
- Miroslav Vitous
- V.S.O.P.
- Narada Michael Walden
- Jerry Jeff Walker
- Junior Walker
- T-Bone Walker
- George Wallington
- Wally
- Joe Walsh
- Steve Walsh
- Bill Watrous
- Ernie Watts
- Weather Report
- Art Webb
- Eric Weissberg & Deliverance
- Bob Welch
- Wendy & Lisa
- Clarence Wheeler
- Wet Willie
- Alan White
- Josh White
- Lenny White
- Michael White
- Wild Horses
- Wildlife
- The Wild Swans
- Lenny Williams
- Flip Wilson
- Nancy Wilson
- Jesse Winchester
- Winger
- Edgar Winter
- Johnny Winter
- Wipers
- Wishbone Ash
- Peter Wolf
- Ronnie Wood
- Roy Wood
- Stevie Woods
- World's Greatest Jazz Band
- Wrath
- Wrathchild America
- Gary Wright
- Tammy Wynette
- Xciter
- Jesse Colin Young
- The Youngbloods
- Zager and Evans
- Joe Zawinul

== See also ==
- List of record labels
