= Idle Eyes =

Canadian band

- Origin: Vancouver, British Columbia, Canada
- Genre: Pop rock
- Years active: 1983–1994; 2002–present
- Label: WEA
- Members: Tad Campbell
- Past members: Glenn R. Smith; Miles Fox Hill; John Webster; Phil Robertson; Randy Booth; Al Webster; Bud Omstead; Dave Stone; Bruce Mckenzie; Scotty Hall; Russel Newell; Gus Vassos; Tony Ferraro; Mark Poy; Randy Heibert; Kelly Cook; Thom Christiansen; Donna McConville; Dudley Welsh; Mike Poulter; Kevin O'Brien; Bill Meikle; Don Biggar; James Chadwick; Steve Elaschuk; Terry Alton; Larry Pardue; Kevin Swain

Idle Eyes is a Canadian Pop rock band from Vancouver, British Columbia. They are best known for the Canadian hit single "Tokyo Rose", which peaked at #16 on RPM's Canadian singles chart in June 1985.

== History ==
The band had its genesis in 1980 while Tad Campbell (born in Trail, British Columbia) was travelling in Australia. He encountered an advertisement for a local band looking for a guitarist, and wound up spending several months as a member of the house band at a resort in the Whitsunday Islands. During this time, the band were joined by new vocalist Donna McConville, who would also become Campbell's girlfriend. They later moved to Townsville, Queensland, where they recorded early demos of several songs that would eventually end up on the band's first two albums.

Campbell eventually returned to Canada with McConville, putting together a new lineup since most of the original Australian members had not moved with them. The band lineup changed frequently over the early years, including McConville eventually leaving the band when her relationship with Campbell ended. She returned to Australia, where she became a backing vocalist for John Farnham.

The band was nearly dormant when Campbell made a last-ditch effort to record a demo, which he sent to Payolas manager Cliff Jones in the hopes of securing a recording contract. Jones responded favourably, so Campbell and drummer Phil Robertson recruited Glenn R. Smith (guitars), Miles "Foxx" Hill (bass), and John Webster (keyboards) to record the band's self-titled debut album. Campbell wrote all the songs on the album, occasionally with assistance from outside collaborators; Smith also co-wrote one song ("Two Rivers").

The singles "Tokyo Rose" and "All Day" won awards from SOCAN as two of the top ten most played songs on Canadian radio that year. The band toured extensively as an opening act for Loverboy, Bryan Adams, Tears for Fears, Toto, The Human League, and Red Rider, as well as at a nationally televised Expo 86 gala which also featured Adams, Loverboy, Sheena Easton, Véronique Béliveau, and Kenny Rogers.

Also in 1985, Campbell participated in the recording of "Actions Speak Louder Than Words", a charity single to raise money for Canadian food banks, alongside Mike Reno, Paul Dean, and Matt Frenette of Loverboy, Darby Mills of Headpins, Johnnie Dee and Derry Grehan of Honeymoon Suite, Paul Hyde, Carole Pope, and Murray McLauchlan.

Idle Eyes were nominated for three Juno Awards in 1985, winning for Most Promising New Group. Other awards included six West Coast Music Awards, winning group of the year honors in 1985 and 1986. Campbell won Songwriter of the Year in 1985 for "Tokyo Rose", which was also named Song of the Year. "Tokyo Rose" was inspired by the generic name "Tokyo Rose", which was used to describe female Japanese DJs who attempted to shake the morale of American soldiers and spread propaganda in the Pacific Theater during World War II.

Smith and Webster left Idle Eyes in 1986, and were replaced by Scotty Hall (guitars) and Bruce Mackenzie (keyboards). The group's second album Love's Imperfection was produced by Michael Beinhorn and engineered by Bob Rock at the Little Mountain Studio. Released at Christmastime with no videos, the single "Sandra" topped out at #83 on the Canadian charts, and the album sold fewer than 20,000 units. The band was dropped from their label a few months later.

The band carried on, with Hill and Robertson dropping out, leaving Campbell as the sole remaining original member of Idle Eyes. Joining Campbell, Hall and Mackenzie for Idle Eyes' independently produced third album Standing at the Edge (1988) were Tom Christianson (bass) and Dudley Welsh (drums). The album spun off a minor hit, "Blue Train".

By the early nineties, the Idle Eyes line-up was subject to constant flux, with Campbell being the sole permanent member. A best-of album, Land of the Midnight Sun, was released in 1994, and was credited to "Tad Campbell & Idle Eyes". In addition to the original versions of tracks such as "Tokyo Rose", "All Day", and "Blue Train", it featured six new songs, with the newly-recorded material being played by a line up of Tad Campbell (vocals, guitar), Darryl Havers (keyboards), Randy Booth (bass), Al Webster (drums), Tony Ferraro (percussion), Caley Faryon (saxophone).

After the band's breakup in 1994, Campbell formed the bands Leghold Trap, Millions of Brazilians and Big Daddio before reforming Idle Eyes in the early 2000s. In February 2021, Campbell was convicted of sexually assaulting a minor on a night between September 1996 and January 1999. Campbell received a 12 month conditional sentence.

== Discography ==
=== Albums ===
- Idle Eyes - 1985 #42 CAN
- Love's Imperfection - 1986 #93 CAN
- Standing at the Edge - 1988
- Land of the Midnight Sun - 1994 (released as "Tad Campbell & Idle Eyes")
- Karma Cops - 2000
- Bites Back - 2002

== Members ==
- Tad Campbell (lead vocals, rhythm guitar)
- Phil Robertson (drums)
- Glenn R. Smith (guitars)
- Miles Fox Hill (bass)
- Scotty Hall (Guitar — Loves Imperfection)
- Bruce MacKenzie (Keyboard - Loves Imperfection and post 1985)
- John Webster (Keyboard - Idle Eyes 1985 tour)
- Touring members post 1988
- Randy Booth (Bass)
- Al Webster (Drums)

== Additional touring members post 1988 ==
- Bud Omstead (Bass-loves imperfection tour 1986)
- Dave Stone (keys)
- Russel Newell (drums)
- Gus Vassos (vocals)
- Tony Ferraro (drums)
- Mark Poy (keys)
- Patrick Miles (guitar)
- Kelly Cook (bass)
- Thom Christiansen (bass)

== First version of Idle Eyes ==
- Donna McConville (lead vocals, keyboards)
- Dudley Welsh (drums)
- Mike Poulter (bass)
- Kevin O'Brien (bass, saxophone, vocals)
- Bill Meikle (saxophone)
- Don Biggar (bass)
- James Chadwick (drums)
- Steve Elaschuk (bass)
- Terry Alton (guitar)
- Larry Pardue (bass, vocals)
- Kevin Swain (bass, vocals)
