= Hope (Harem Scarem album) =

Studio album by Harem Scarem
- Released: June 25, 2008
- Recorded: Vespa Studios, North York, Ontario, Canada and Hope Sound, 2007-08
- Genre: Hard rock
- Length: 38:25
- Label: Frontiers (Europe); Marquee/Avalon (Japan)
- Producer: Harry Hess, Pete Lesperance

Harem Scarem chronology
Melodic Rock EP (2008)	Hope (2008)	This Ain't Over - Best Of The Avalon Years (2009)

Hope is a 2008 album by the Canadian hard rock band Harem Scarem. This was to be the band's twelfth and final studio album, but they re-formed in 2013 to release Mood Swings II. The European version of the album contains an acoustic version of "Higher", which was originally from their 2003 album Higher.

== Track listing ==
All tracks are written by Harry Hess and Pete Lesperance, except "Nothing Without You" by Hess.

No.	Title	Length
1.	"Watch Your Back"	3:51
2.	"Time Bomb"	4:27
3.	"Hope"	3:44
4.	"Days Are Numbered"	3:46
5.	"Dark Times"	3:20
6.	"Beyond Repair"	3:51
7.	"Never Too Late"	3:34
8.	"Shooting Star"	3:53
9.	"Calm Before the Storm"	3:13
10.	"Nothing Without You"	4:42

European bonus track

11. "Higher" (acoustic)

== Band members ==
- Harry Hess - lead vocals, guitar, producer
- Pete Lesperance - lead guitar, backing vocals, producer
- Barry Donaghy - bass guitar, backing vocals
- Creighton Doane - drums, backing vocals

== Charts ==
Chart (2008)	Peak position
Japanese Albums (Oricon)	79

== Release history ==
Region	Date
Japan	June 25, 2008
Europe	July 4, 2008
