= Honeymoon suite =

Honeymoon suite may mean:

- Honeymoon suite (hotel)
- Honeymoon Suite, a Canadian hard rock band
  - Honeymoon Suite (album), a 1984 album by the band
- The Honeymoon Suite, a British rock band; see The Cape Race
- "Honeymoon Suite", a song by Lacuna Coil from the 1999 album In a Reverie
