= Clifton Hill =

Clifton Hill may mean:

- Clifton Hill, Missouri, a town in USA
- Clifton Hill, Victoria, a suburb of Melbourne, Australia
  - Clifton Hill railway station
- Clifton Hill, Niagara Falls, a tourist promenade Niagara Falls, Ontario, Canada
- Clifton Hill, part of the suburb of Montpelier, Brighton, UK
- Clifton Hill (album), a 2008 album by Canadian rock band Honeymoon Suite
- Clifton Hill, U.S. Virgin Islands, town in the U.S.V.I.
- Clifton Hills Station, a pastoral lease and cattle station in South Australia
- Disappearance at Clifton Hill (a/k/a Clifton Hill), a Canadian thriller film
