= Monsters Under the Bed =

Studio album by Honeymoon Suite
- Released: 1991
- Genre: Hard rock
- Label: WEA Canada
- Producers: Paul Northfield, Ray Coburn, Johnnie Dee, Derry Grehan

Honeymoon Suite chronology
Racing After Midnight (1988)	Monsters Under the Bed (1991)	Lemon Tongue (2001)

Monsters Under the Bed is an album by the Canadian hard rock band Honeymoon Suite, released in 1991. The band was now a trio, consisting of Johnnie Dee, Dermot "Derry" Grehan, and returning keyboardist Ray Coburn.

== Production ==
The album was produced by Paul Northfield, Ray Coburn, Johnnie Dee, and Derry Grehan. It was partly recorded in St. Anne-des-Lacs, Quebec. The band's rhythm section consisted of session musicians Steve Webster (bassist) and Jorn Anderson (drums). "How Long" is about Niagara Falls. "Bring On the Light" was inspired by the Oka Crisis.

== Critical reception ==
Professional ratings
Review scores
Source	Rating
Calgary Herald	B
Rock Hard	7.5/10

The Calgary Herald noted that there are "lots of Grehan power riffs balanced (thankfully) by washes of Coburn's synthesizers and organ."

== Track listing ==
All songs written by Ray Coburn, Johnnie Dee, and Derry Grehan.

No.	Title	Length
1.	"Say You Don't Know Me"
2.	"Bring On the Light"
3.	"If Ya Love Me"
4.	"The Road"
5.	"Little Sister"
6.	"How Long"
7.	"Come (Let Me Take You There)"
8.	"Miracle"
9.	"It's Only Love"
10.	"Next to You"
11.	"Stand Alone"
12.	"All I Wanted"

== Personnel ==
Honeymoon Suite:

- Johnnie Dee – lead vocals
- Derry Grehan – guitars, vocals
- Ray Coburn – keyboards

with:

- Steve Webster (bassist) – bass guitar
- Jorn Anderson – drums
- Suki Mars – background vocals on 1 and 11

== Charts ==
Chart (1991)	Peak position
Canada Top Albums/CDs (RPM)	77
