= Racing After Midnight =

Studio album by Honeymoon Suite
- Released: March 8, 1988
- Recorded: June 1987 – January 1988
- Studios: One on One Studios; Amigo Studios; North Hollywood, California
- Genres: Hard rock, glam metal
- Length: 38:14
- Label: Warner Bros.
- Producers: Ted Templeman and Jeff Hendrickson

Honeymoon Suite chronology
The Big Prize (1986)	Racing After Midnight (1988)	Monsters Under the Bed (1991)

Professional ratings
Review scores
Source	Rating
Allmusic	4/5 stars

Racing After Midnight is the third studio album by Canadian pop metal band Honeymoon Suite, released on March 8, 1988. In 1989 the album was certified Double Platinum in Canada (in excess of 200,000 copies sold). It is also the only Honeymoon Suite album to feature Spoons keyboardist Rob Preuss.

== Contemporary reviews ==
In the June 1988 issue of Circus magazine, music critic Paul Gallotta noted that the release represented a definitive breakthrough for the formation. According to the review, the material demonstrated that the Canadian musicians had fully "hit their stride" following two prior efforts dedicated to refining their signature "hard pop" sound. Gallotta drew stylistic comparisons to Journey and Loverboy, arguing that tracks such as "Lookin' Out for #1" and "Lethal Weapon" successfully integrated the finest elements of both arena rock foundations while maintaining an original artistic edge. Additionally, the publication commended the high production standards of the record, credited to veteran producer Ted Templeman, famous for his extensive work with Van Halen.

== Track listing ==
No.	Title	Writer(s)	Length
1.	"Lookin' Out for Number One"	Dermot Grehan, Johnnie Dee, Rob Preuss	3:31
2.	"Long Way Back"	Dermot Grehan, Johnnie Dee, Michael McDonald	4:35
3.	"Cold Look"	Tom Kelly, Billy Steinberg	4:03
4.	"Love Fever"	Dermot Grehan, Johnnie Dee, Rob Preuss	3:33
5.	"Other Side of Midnight"	Dermot Grehan, Johnnie Dee	4:05
6.	"Love Changes Everything"	Dermot Grehan, Johnnie Dee, Rob Preuss	4:21
7.	"It's Over Now"	Dermot Grehan, Johnnie Dee	4:02
8.	"Fast Company"	Dermot Grehan, Rob Preuss	4:13
9.	"Tears on the Page"	Dermot Grehan, Johnnie Dee	3:20
10.	"Lethal Weapon" (Remix from the Motion Picture)	Michael Kamen	2:44

== Personnel ==
Musicians

- Johnnie Dee - lead vocals
- Dermot "Derry" Grehan - guitars, vocals
- Dave Betts - drums
- Gary Lalonde - bass
- Rob Preuss - keyboards
- Bobby LaKind - percussion
- Ted Templeman - percussion

Additional personnel

- Michael McDonald - backing vocals on "Long Way Back"

Technical and additional personnel

- Ted Templeman - producer
- Jeff Hendrickson - engineer, producer
- Toby Wright - engineer
- Garth Richardson, Chris Steinmetz - assistant engineers
- George Marino - mastering
- Joan Parker - production coordination
- Kim Champagne - art direction, design
- Jeri Heiden - art direction
- William Coupon - cover photo
- Douglas Fraser - logo
- Dave Betts - photography
- Jim Prue - inlay photography

== Charts ==
Chart (1988)	Peak position
Canada Top Albums/CDs (RPM)	6
Swedish Albums (Sverigetopplistan)	48
US Billboard 200	86

== Certifications ==
Region	Certification	Certified units/sales
Canada (Music Canada)	2× Platinum	200,000^{^}
^{^} Shipments figures based on certification alone.
