= Rubber (Harem Scarem album) =

Studio album by Rubber
- Released: October 26, 1999
- Recorded: Vespa Studios, North York, Ontario, Canada, 1999
- Genre: Hard rock
- Length: 39:40
- Label: WEA
- Producers: Pete Lesperance, Harry Hess, Arnold Lanni

Rubber chronology
Ballads (1999)	Rubber (1999)	Last Live (2000)

Rubber is an album by the Canadian hard rock band Rubber (formerly known as Harem Scarem). The band released the album in 1999 under the name Harem Scarem in Japan, and in 2000 in Canada they released it as Rubber. After this release, drummer Darren Smith left and was replaced with Creighton Doane. The song "Sunshine" was produced and mixed by Canadian producer Arnold Lanni.

== Track listing ==
All tracks are written by Harry Hess and Pete Lesperance, except "Trip" by Lesperance.

No.	Title	Length
1.	"It's Gotta Be"	3:26
2.	"Who-Buddy"	3:46
3.	"Coming Down"	3:38
4.	"Stuck with You"	3:34
5.	"Sunshine"	4:57
6.	"Face It"	3:39
7.	"Trip"	4:53
8.	"Pool Party"	4:46
9.	"Headache"	2:53
10.	"Everybody Else"	4:04
11.	"Enemy" (Japanese edition bonus track)	3:58

== Release history ==
Region	Date
Japan	October 26, 1999
Canada	March 27, 2000

== Band members ==
- Harry Hess – lead vocals, guitar, producer
- Pete Lesperance – lead guitar, backing vocals, producer
- Barry Donaghy – bass, backing vocals
- Darren Smith – drums, backing vocals
