= Overload (Harem Scarem album) =

Studio album by Harem Scarem
- Released: May 17, 2005
- Recorded: Vespa Studios, North York, Ontario, Canada and Hope Sound, 2005
- Genre: Hard rock
- Length: 37:53
- Label: Frontiers (Europe); Marquee/Avalon (Japan)
- Producer: Harry Hess, Pete Lesperance

Harem Scarem chronology
Higher (2003)	Overload (2005)	The Essentials (2005)

Overload is a 2005 album by the Canadian hard rock band Harem Scarem. It is the tenth Harem Scarem studio album. The Japanese version contains the song "You Shook Me All Night Long" (AC/DC cover) as a bonus track, while the European CD comes with "Wishing" which was previously released on the Japanese version of Higher.

== Track listing ==
All tracks are written by Harry Hess and Pete Lesperance, except "Understand You" by Hess

No.	Title	Length
1.	"Dagger"	4:00
2.	"Afterglow"	4:13
3.	"Rise & Fall"	3:44
4.	"Don't Come Easy"	4:10
5.	"Can't Live with You"	3:36
6.	"Forgive & Forget"	3:56
7.	"All You're Getting"	3:38
8.	"Leading Me On"	3:42
9.	"Understand You"	3:26
10.	"Same Mistakes"	3:27

Japanese version bonus track

11. "You Shook Me All Night Long"

== Band members ==
- Harry Hess - lead vocals, guitar, producer
- Pete Lesperance - lead guitar, backing vocals, producer
- Barry Donaghy - bass, backing vocals
- Creighton Doane - drums, backing vocals
