= Human Nature (Harem Scarem album) =

Studio album by Harem Scarem
- Released: November 21, 2006
- Recorded: Vespa Studios, North York, Ontario, Canada and Hope Sound, 2006
- Genre: Hard rock
- Length: 45:10
- Label: Marquee/Avalon (Japan); Vespa Music Group (rest of the world)
- Producer: Harry Hess, Pete Lesperance

Harem Scarem chronology
Live at Firefest (2005)	Human Nature (2006)	Raw and Rare (2008)

Human Nature is a 2006 album by the Canadian hard rock band Harem Scarem.

== Track listing ==
All tracks are written by Harry Hess and Pete Lesperance, except where noted

No.	Title	Length
1.	"Human Nature"	4:02
2.	"Next Time Around"	3:51
3.	"Caught Up in Your World"	3:59
4.	"Reality"	3:49
5.	"Hanging On" (Hess)	4:13
6.	"Don't Throw It Away" (Hess, Lesperance, Creighton Doane)	4:38
7.	"Give Love/Get Love" (Hess)	4:28
8.	"21"	3:59
9.	"Starlight"	4:13
10.	"Going Under"	3:40
11.	"Tomorrow May Be Gone"	4:14

== Band members ==
- Harry Hess - lead vocals, guitar, producer
- Pete Lesperance - lead guitar, backing vocals, producer
- Barry Donaghy - bass, backing vocals
- Creighton Doane - drums, backing vocals

== Charts ==
Chart (2006)	Peak position
Japanese Albums (Oricon)	54

== Release history ==
Region	Date
Japan	November 21, 2006
Canada	January 12, 2007
Europe	January 12, 2007
