= Raw and Rare =

Raw and Rare may refer to:

- Raw and Rare (The Von Bondies album), 2003
- Raw and Rare (Harem Scarem album), 2008
