= Harem Scarem (album) =

Studio album by Harem Scarem
- Released: August 6, 1991
- Recorded: 1991
- Studio: Sounds Interchange Studios, Cabin Fever Studios, and Phase One Studios
- Genre: Glam metal; hard rock; arena rock
- Length: 40:45
- Label: WEA
- Producer: Kevin Doyle, Harry Hess, and Pete Lesperance.

Harem Scarem chronology
| Harem Scarem (1991) | Acoustic Sessions (1991) |

Singles from Harem Scarem
- 1. "Slowly Slipping Away" Released: 1991; 2. "Love Reaction" Released: 1991; 3. "Honestly" Released: 1992; 4. "With a Little Love" Released: 1992; 5. "Something to Say" Released: 1992

Professional ratings
Review scores
| Source | Rating |
|---|---|
| Allmusic | 3/5 stars |

Harem Scarem is the 1991 debut album by the Canadian hard rock band of the same name. Music videos were shot for the songs; "Slowly Slipping Away", "Honestly", and "With a Little Love". The album charted at No. 68 on the Canadian charts. However two singles from the album, "Honestly" and "Something to Say", were big hits in Indonesia and the Philippines.

The album includes guest appearances by fellow Canadian stars such as Ray Coburn of Honeymoon Suite, Carl Dixon of Coney Hatch and Paul MacAusland of Haywire. It also boasted a co-writing credit by award-winning songwriter Christopher Ward of "Black Velvet" fame.

== Connection to Degrassi ==
In 1992, Harem Scarem was able to gain some notoriety when 8 songs from their debut album were predominantly featured in the Canadian teen series Degrassi Junior High and Degrassi High's farewell TV movie, School's Out.

== Track listing ==
| No. | Title | Writer(s) | Length |
|---|---|---|---|
| 1. | "Hard to Love" | Christopher Ward, Harry Hess, Pete Lesperance | 4:28 |
| 2. | "Distant Memory" | Hess, Lesperance, Marc Ribler | 4:29 |
| 3. | "With a Little Love" | Hess, Lesperance | 4:00 |
| 4. | "Honestly" | Hess | 4:02 |
| 5. | "Love Reaction" | Hess, Lesperance, Ray Coburn | 3:53 |
| 6. | "Slowly Slipping Away" | Hess, Ribler | 3:45 |
| 7. | "All Over Again" | Hess | 3:07 |
| 8. | "Don't Give Your Heart Away" | Hess, Lesperance | 3:29 |
| 9. | "How Long" | Hess, Lesperance, Dean McTaggart | 5:03 |
| 10. | "Something to Say" | Hess, Lesperance | 4:42 |

== Charts ==
=== Album ===
| Year | Chart | Position |
|---|---|---|
| 1992 | Canada | 68 |

=== Singles ===
| Year | Single | Chart | Position |
|---|---|---|---|
| 1991 | "Slowly Slipping Away" | Canada | 25 |
| 1991 | "Love Reaction" | Canada | 55 |
| 1992 | "Honestly" | Canada | 68 |
| 1992 | "With a Little Love" | Canada | — |
| 1992 | "Something to Say" | Canada | — |

== Personnel ==
=== Band ===
- Harry Hess – lead vocals, guitar, producer
- Pete Lesperance – lead guitar, backing vocals, producer
- Mike Gionet – bass, backing vocals
- Darren Smith – drums, backing vocals

=== Guest musicians ===
- Ray Coburn – keyboards
- Terry Hatty, Carl Dixon, Marc Ribler, Paul MacAusland – backing vocals

=== Credits ===
- Kevin Doyle – producer, engineer and mixing
- Stephen Marcussen – mastering
- Greg Torrington – cover artist
- Julie Rich – repertoire
