= Live at the Gods =

Live at the Gods may refer to:

- Live at the Gods (Bob Catley album), 1998
- Live at the Gods 2002 a 2002 live album by Harem Scarem
- Live at the Gods Festival 2002, a 2003 live album by Hardline
