= Slowly Slipping Away =

Single by Harem Scarem

from the album Harem Scarem
- Released: 1991
- Recorded: 1991
- Studio: Sounds Interchange Studios, Cabin Fever Studios, and Phase One Studios
- Genre: Glam metal, AOR
- Length: 3:41
- Label: Warner Music Canada
- Songwriters: Harry Hess, Marc Ribler
- Producers: Kevin Doyle, Harry Hess, and Pete Lesperance

Harem Scarem singles chronology
"Slowly Slipping Away" (1991)	"Love Reaction" (1991)

"Slowly Slipping Away" is the debut single by Canadian glam metal band Harem Scarem, released in 1991 from their self-titled debut album. "Slowly Slipping Away" is Harem Scarem's biggest hit, reaching No. 25 on the Canadian singles chart. The song also had a music video shot in Ottawa for it.

== Band ==
- Harry Hess - vocals
- Pete Lesperance – guitar
- Mike Gionet - bass guitar
- Darren Smith - drums
- Ray Coburn - keyboards
