= Clifton Hill (album) =

Studio album by Honeymoon Suite
- Released: September 23, 2008
- Recorded: December 2007 – April 2008 at Catherine North (Hamilton, ON) & Carlisle Post Audio
- Genre: Rock
- Label: Koch
- Producer: Tom Treumuth

Honeymoon Suite chronology
Dreamland (2002)	Clifton Hill (2008)	Hands Up - EP (2016)

Clifton Hill is the seventh studio album by Canadian pop metal band Honeymoon Suite, released in late 2008.

== Background and details ==
After Honeymoon Suite's original lineup (circa 1984) reunited to tour Canada in the mid-2000s. Honeymoon Suite consisting of original band members Johnnie Dee and Derry Grehan returned to the studio to record a new album with their original producer and current manager, Tom Tremeuth. The first single released to radio was "Tired O' Waitin' on You".

The album title is an homage to the cluster of tourist attractions on Clifton Hill in the band's hometown of Niagara Falls, Ontario. As guitarist Derry Grehan explained in an interview with The Niagara Falls Review: "I think our best record was The Big Prize, and the new songs were kind of sounding like that. Riffy, simple with big choruses. So with Johnnie and I paying homage to our roots, we thought (for a title) ... 'Lundy's Lane?' No. Trying to find a name for a record after the fact is hard. At one point Clifton Hill came up. I thought it had a nice feel for an album title. Easy to remember. I can't explain it, it just kind of works."

The photograph used for the album's cover was taken by Russell Harbottle in 1985.

== Track listing ==
1. "She Ain't Alright" - 3:50
2. "Tired o' Waitin' on You" - 3:02
3. "Riffola" - 3:53
4. "Ordinary" - 3:52
5. "The House" - 4:12
6. "Why Should I?" - 3:35
7. "Down 2 Bizness" - 3:49
8. "Sunday Morning" - 3:51
9. "That's All U Got" - 3:36
10. "Restless" - 3:17
11. "Separate Lives" - 3:33
12. "The Garden" - 3:42

All songs written by Johnnie Dee and Derry Grehan.

== Album credits ==
=== Personnel ===
- Johnnie Dee - lead vocals
- Derry Grehan - guitars, background vocals
- Ray Coburn - keyboards
- Chris McNeill - drums
- Stan Mizcek - bass

=== Production ===
- Tom Treumuth - producer, mixer
- Corey Barnes - engineer, mixer
- Rob Lamothe - pre-production engineering
- Phil Demetro - mastering at The Lacquer Channel
- Katie Hildreth - album design (with cdexperts.com)
- Deanna Grehan - cover concept
