= Mood Swings (Harem Scarem album) =

Studio album by Harem Scarem
- Released: June 11, 1993
- Recorded: 1993
- Studio: Cabin Fever Studios
- Genre: Glam metal AOR
- Length: 44:13
- Label: WEA
- Producer: Kevin Doyle, Harry Hess and Pete Lesperance

Harem Scarem chronology
| Acoustic Sessions (1991) | Mood Swings (1993) | Live and Acoustic (1994) |

Singles from Mood Swings
- 1. "No Justice" Released: 1993; 2. "Change Comes Around" Released: 1993; 3. "If There Was a Time" Released: 1994

Professional ratings
Review scores
| Source | Rating |
|---|---|
| Allmusic | 3/5 stars |

Mood Swings is a 1993 album by the Canadian hard rock band Harem Scarem. A music video was shot for the song "No Justice". The album charted at No. 85 on the Canadian charts.

In December 2012, it was announced that a reunited Harem Scarem would headline the 10th Firefest festival in Nottingham, UK in October 2013. Harry Hess had been approached by Firefest's promotor to perform the Mood Swings album in its entirety for its twentieth year anniversary. Following that appearance, Harem Scarem re-recorded the Mood Swings album, adding three newly written 'in-keeping' tracks to Mood Swings II, 'World Gone To Piece's, 'Anarchy' and 'A Brighter Day'.

In 2023, and to celebrate the 30th anniversary of Mood Swings the band announced they would be releasing an anniversary edition of the album as Mood Swings Bundle - Limited Edition. The package included a 180-gram purple LP, a CD with five bonus acoustic tracks, and numerous other items of physical and digital memorabilia and similar. Retail price was $89.95.

== Track listing (original release) ==
All tracks are written by Harry Hess and Pete Lesperance, except where noted.

| No. | Title | Length |
|---|---|---|
| 1. | "Saviors Never Cry" | 4:03 |
| 2. | "No Justice" | 4:39 |
| 3. | "Stranger Than Love" | 3:59 |
| 4. | "Change Comes Around" | 5:02 |
| 5. | "Jealousy" | 4:10 |
| 6. | "Sentimental BLVD." (Hess) | 4:24 |
| 7. | "Mandy" (Lesperance) | 1:55 |
| 8. | "Empty Promises" | 4:19 |
| 9. | "If There Was a Time" | 4:58 |
| 10. | "Just Like I Planned" (Hess) | 3:18 |
| 11. | "Had Enough" | 3:56 |

== Charts ==
=== Album ===
| Year | Chart | Position |
|---|---|---|
| 1993 | Canada | 85 |

=== Singles ===
| Year | Single | Chart | Position |
|---|---|---|---|
| 1993 | "No Justice" | Canada | 59 |
| 1993 | "Change Comes Around" | Canada | — |
| 1994 | "If There Was a Time" | Canada | — |

== Personnel ==
Band members

- Harry Hess – lead vocals, guitar, keyboards, producer, engineer.
- Pete Lesperance – lead guitar, backing vocals, producer.
- Mike Gionet – bass, backing vocals.
- Darren Smith – drums, backing vocals, lead vocals on Track 6

Additional musicians

- Rob Cooper – B3 Organ

Production

- Kevin Doyle (recording engineer)|Kevin Doyle – producer, engineer.
- Stephen Marcussen – mastering.
- Andrew MacNaughtan – photography.
- Package design by Stanford Communications.
