= Honeymoon Suite (album) =

Studio album by Honeymoon Suite
- Released: June 3, 1984
- Recorded: 1983–84
- Studios: Phase One Studios, Toronto
- Genres: Hard rock, glam metal
- Length: 38:45
- Label: WEA Canada
- Producer: Tom Treumuth

Honeymoon Suite chronology
Honeymoon Suite (1984)	The Big Prize (1986)

Professional ratings
Review scores
Source	Rating
Allmusic	link

Honeymoon Suite is the debut album by the Canadian rock band Honeymoon Suite, released in 1984 on Warner Bros. Records. In 1990 it was certified Triple Platinum in Canada (in excess of 300,000 copies sold). All four singles - "New Girl Now", "Burning in Love", "Wave Babies" and "Stay in the Light" - were also certified Gold in Canada.

== Track listing ==
All songs written by Dermot Grehan, except where noted.

1. "New Girl Now" – 3:37
2. "Burning in Love" – 4:43
3. "Wave Babies" – 4:21
4. "Stay in the Light" – 3:52
5. "Now That You Got Me" – 3:30
6. "Funny Business" – 4:01
7. "Heart on Fire" (Eddie Schwartz, David Tyson) 2:32
8. "Turn My Head" – 3:29
9. "It's Your Heart" (Dermot Grehan, Ray Coburn) 3:25
10. "Face to Face" – 5:05

== Singles ==
The following singles (together with promotional videos) were released from the album:

#	Title	Release date	CAN	US
1	"New Girl Now"	June 15, 1984	23	57
2	"Burning in Love"	Oct. 5, 1984	75	-
3	"Stay in the Light"	Feb. 8, 1985	44	-
4	"Wave Babies"	June 17, 1985	59	-

== Album credits ==
=== Personnel ===
- Derry Grehan - lead guitar, vocals
- Johnnie Dee - lead vocals, guitar
- Brian Brackstone - bass guitar (courtesy of Attic Records)
- Ray Coburn - keyboards, vocals
- Dave Betts - drums

Band member Gary Lalonde (bass guitar, vocals) is shown in the photograph of the band on the back cover.

=== Production ===
- Tom Treumuth - producer
- Lenny De Rose, Mark Wright - engineers
- Joe Primeau, Garth Richardson - assistant engineers
- Mixed at the Farmyard Studios, Bucks, England by Stephen W. Tayler
- Assisted by Andy Scarth
- ^Mixed at Electric Lady Studios, N.Y.C. by David Wittman
- ^Originally mastered at Masterdisk, N.Y.C. by Bob Ludwig

== Charts ==
Chart (1984)	Peak position
Canada Top Albums/CDs (RPM)	49
US Billboard 200	60

== Certifications ==
Region	Certification	Certified units/sales
Canada (Music Canada)	3× Platinum	300,000^{^}
^{^} Shipments figures based on certification alone.
