= Honestly (Harem Scarem song) =

Single by Harem Scarem

from the album Harem Scarem
- Released: 1992
- Studio: Sounds Interchange Studios, Cabin Fever Studios, and Phase One Studios
- Length: 4:02
- Label: Warner Music
- Songwriter: Harry Hess
- Producers: Kevin Doyle, Harry Hess, and Pete Lesperance

Harem Scarem singles chronology
"Love Reaction" (1991)	"Honestly" (1992)	"With a Little Love" (1992)

"Honestly" is the title of a power ballad by Canadian glam metal band Harem Scarem. The song appears on their 1991 self-titled debut album. The song charted at #68 on the Canadian singles chart and also had a music video shot for it. The music video starred American actor Judge Reinhold as the male love interest. The song garnered popularity in Asian countries mainly the Philippines and Indonesia, and to this day the song is still played constantly in radio stations and bars.

== Band ==
- Harry Hess - vocals
- Pete Lesperance – guitar
- Mike Gionet - bass guitar
- Darren Smith - drums
- Ray Coburn - keyboards
