= Ratchell =

American rock band

- Origin: Huntsville, Alabama
- Genres: Folk rock, blues and country
- Years active: 1971 - 1972
- Label: Decca Records
- Past members: Larry Byrom; Howard Messer; Pat Couchois; Chris Couchois

Ratchell was an American rock band formed by former Steppenwolf guitarist Larry Byrom. The lineup also included bassist Howard Messer, guitarist Pat Couchois, and drummer Chris Couchois. The band released two albums on Decca Records: Ratchell in 1971 and Ratchell II in 1972.

== Biography ==
Larry Byrom, after leaving Steppenwolf in 1971, founded Ratchell with three childhood friends from Alabama. Two of the members had previously played with Byrom in the band T.I.M.E. (Trust in Men Everywhere). Ratchell was signed by MCA Records for what Billboard described as "one of the heaviest advances in years". Their self-titled debut album was released on MCA subsidiary Decca Records in 1971. Ratchell, which featured songwriting from all four band members, peaked at number 176 on the Billboard 200 chart in April 1972.

The album received mixed reviews from contemporary music critics, with Billboard remarking that the band's material "would serve well on any progressive rock station [...] or a hip Top 40 station into LP acts." Ronald Marchetti of The Morning Record said the band's music "could most easily be described as unobtrusive, tasteful, and anemic." Perry Fulkerson of the Evening Independent likened Ratchell to the debut album of Crosby, Stills & Nash, and that the sound of the former "combines a Carlos Santana-type guitar with a good beat and light, harmonious vocals."

Ratchell's second album, Ratchell II, was released on Decca in 1972. It failed to chart and the band soon dissolved. By the end of the decade, Byrom moved to Nashville to work as a songwriter and session musician, while the Couchois brothers and Messer formed the pop-rock band Couchois and released two albums for Warner Bros. Records.

== Discography ==
Title	Album details	Peak chart positions
Title	Album details	US
Ratchell	Released: 1971; Label: Decca; Format: LP	176
Ratchell II	Released: 1972; Label: Decca; Format: LP	—
