= Ultra Feel =

Studio album by Rubber
- Released: February 28, 2001
- Recorded: Vespa Studios, North York, Ontario, Canada, 2000
- Genre: Hard rock
- Length: 35:30
- Label: WEA
- Producer: Harry Hess, Pete Lesperance

Rubber chronology
Rocks (2001)	Ultra Feel (2001)	The Very Best of Harem Scarem (2002)

Ultra Feel is an album by the Canadian hard rock band Rubber (formerly known as Harem Scarem).

The album was rated 3 out of 5 stars by AllMusic.

== Track listing (Canadian edition) ==
No.	Title	Writer(s)	Length
1.	"Another Nail in My Heart" (Squeeze cover)	Chris Difford, Glenn Tilbrook	2:42
2.	"Hopeless"	Harry Hess, Pete Lesperance	2:50
3.	"In the End"	Lesperance	3:10
4.	"Running Away"	Hess	3:38
5.	"Spinning Around"	Hess, Lesperance	3:46
6.	"Happiness"	Lesperance	4:09
7.	"No Doubt"	Hess, Lesperance	3:22
8.	"Over the Edge"	Hess, Lesperance	4:17
9.	"Forgive"	Hess, Lesperance	3:44
10.	"Everything You Do"	Lesperance	3:52

== Personnel ==
- Harry Hess – lead vocals, guitar, keyboards
- Pete Lesperance – lead guitar, vocals, keyboards
- Barry Donaghy – bass guitar, vocals
- Creighton Doane – drums
