= Higher (Harem Scarem album) =

Studio album by Harem Scarem
- Released: September 15, 2003
- Recorded: Vespa Studios, North York, Ontario, Canada and Hope Sound, 2003
- Genre: Hard rock
- Length: 37:40
- Label: Frontiers (Europe); Marquee/Avalon (Japan)
- Producer: Harry Hess, Pete Lesperance

Harem Scarem chronology
The Early Years (2003)	Higher (2003)	Overload (2005)

Higher is a 2003 album by the Canadian hard rock band Harem Scarem.

== Track listing ==
All tracks are written by Harry Hess and Pete Lesperance

No.	Title	{{{extra_column}}}	Length
1.	"Reach"		4:35
2.	"Waited"		3:53
3.	"Torn Right Out"		3:14
4.	"Give It to You"		3:44
5.	"Higher"		4:00
6.	"Run and Hide"		3:18
7.	"Lucky Ones"		3:44
8.	"Lies"		3:42
9.	"Gone"		3:37
10.	"Lost"		3:57
11.	"Wishing (Bonus Track)"	Japanese edition bonus track.	2:55

== Band members ==
- Harry Hess - lead vocals, guitar, producer
- Pete Lesperance - lead guitar, backing vocals
- Barry Donaghy - bass, backing vocals
- Creighton Doane - drums, backing vocals
