= The Big Prize =

Studio album by Honeymoon Suite
- Released: February 14, 1986
- Recorded: 1985
- Studios: The Boogie Hotel, Long Island, NY & Little Mountain Sound, Vancouver, BC
- Genre: Rock
- Length: 44:17
- Label: WEA Canada / Warner Bros.
- Producer: Bruce Fairbairn

Honeymoon Suite chronology
Honeymoon Suite (1984)	The Big Prize (1986)	Racing After Midnight (1988)

Singles from The Big Prize
- 1. "Bad Attitude" Released: December 17, 1985; 2. "Feel It Again" Released: January 26, 1986; 3. "What Does It Take" Released: June 3, 1986; 4. "All Along You Knew" Released: 1986

Professional ratings
Review scores
Source	Rating
Allmusic	3/5 stars

The Big Prize is the second album by Honeymoon Suite, released in 1986. It featured four hit singles, including the band's biggest hit in the U.S., "Feel It Again," and "Bad Attitude," which was notably featured in a sequence in the final episode of Miami Vice 4 years later. In 1990 the album was certified Triple Platinum in Canada (in excess of 300,000 copies sold) by the CRIA (Canadian Recording Industry Association).

The album cover features a newly married couple having their picture taken by some tourists at Niagara Falls, Honeymoon Suite's hometown. The photo was taken on the Canadian side of the Falls.

Following the release of this album, the band won the Juno Award for "Group of the Year" and was also nominated for "Album of the Year" in 1986.

In a 2008 interview, Honeymoon Suite's guitarist Derry Grehan said "I think our best record was The Big Prize."

== Background and writing ==
Following the success of their debut album and a subsequent two-year tour, Honeymoon Suite wrote much of their next album on the road. The Big Prize was produced by Bruce Fairbairn with assistance from fellow Canadian Bob Rock and featured the trademark 80s sound of rock guitars interlaced with keyboards.

The first single "Bad Attitude" was written by guitarist Derry Grehan, and according to singer Johnnie Dee "Derry was playing this lick for a long time and eventually wrote this song around it. The chorus wouldn't come together for us until Bruce Fairbairn helped us out. The lyrics kinda summed up our feelings at the time."

The second single released was "Feel It Again," written by keyboardist Ray Coburn. This tune became the band's first, and only single to date to crack the Billboard Top 40 Chart in the States. It was also extremely successful at home in Canada.

The third single was the power ballad "What Does It Take" and was originally written on a Fostex recorder at a gig in Sarnia, Ontario. The song was added to the soundtrack for the movie One Crazy Summer.

It was Bob Rock's production work on this record (specifically as an engineer) that is largely credited with helping him get noticed by Jon Bon Jovi. Rock engineered Bon Jovi's massive break-out album Slippery When Wet, which was a major launching point in Rock's engineering and producing career.

== Track listing ==
All songs written by Derry Grehan except where noted.

1. "Bad Attitude" - 5:28
2. "Feel It Again" (Ray Coburn) - 4:37
3. "Lost and Found" (Coburn) - 4:22
4. "What Does It Take" - 4:13
5. "One by One" - 3:42
6. "Wounded" (Johnnie Dee) - 4:36
7. "Words in the Wind" - 4:35
8. "All Along You Knew" - 4:19
9. "Once the Feeling" - 4:32
10. "Take My Hand" - 3:41

== Singles ==
The following singles were released from the album, with the highest charting positions listed.

#	Title	Release date	CAN	Hot 100
1.	"Bad Attitude"	Dec. 17, 1985	-	-
2.	"Feel It Again"	Jan. 24, 1986	16	34
3.	"What Does It Take"	June 3, 1986	21	52
4.	"All Along You Knew"	1986	65	-

== Album credits ==
=== Personnel ===
- Johnnie Dee - lead vocals
- Derry Grehan - guitars, vocals
- Ray Coburn - keyboards
- Gary Lalonde - bass
- Dave Betts - drums
- Ian Anderson - flute on "All Along You Knew"
- Mickey Curry - additional percussion
- Chris Taylor - additional percussion

=== Production ===
- Bruce Fairbairn - producer
- Bob Rock - engineer
- Michael Larkin - assistant engineer
- Johnnie Q. - assistant engineer
- Mike Fraser - assistant engineer
- Mixed at the Farmyard Studios, Bucks, England by Stephen W. Tayler

== Charts ==
Chart (1986)	Peak position
Canada Top Albums/CDs (RPM)	7
US Billboard 200	61

== Certifications ==
Region	Certification	Certified units/sales
Canada (Music Canada)	3× Platinum	300,000^{^}
^{^} Shipments figures based on certification alone.
