= Feel It Again =

1986 single by Honeymoon Suite

Single by Honeymoon Suite

from the album The Big Prize
- Released: January 26, 1986
- Recorded: 1985, North America
- Genre: Pop rock, hard rock, new wave
- Length: 4:37
- Label: WEA Music of Canada
- Songwriter: Ray Coburn
- Producer: Bruce Fairbairn

Honeymoon Suite singles chronology
| "Bad Attitude" (1985) | "Feel It Again" (1986) | "What Does It Take" (1986) |

Audio
- "Feel It Again" on YouTube

"Feel It Again" is a song by Canadian hard rock band Honeymoon Suite. Written by the band's keyboardist, Ray Coburn and released in 1986 as a single from Honeymoon Suite's second album, The Big Prize, the song was the band's first top 20 hit in Canada and was also the band's biggest stateside hit, reaching #34 on the Billboard Hot 100 on the week ending May 10, 1986. It remains Honeymoon Suite's only top 40 hit in the U.S. to date.

In 2015, Coburn was presented with a SOCAN Classic Award based on the song having been played more than 100,000 times on Canadian radio.
