= Couchois =

American rock band

- Origin: Huntsville, Alabama
- Genres: Album-oriented rock, pop rock, soft rock
- Years active: 1979 - 1981
- Label: Warner Bros.
- Past members: Chris Couchois; Pat Couchois; Mike Couchois; Chas Carlson; Howard Messer

Couchois was an American rock band consisting of the Couchois brothers - Chris (vocals), Pat (guitar), and Mike (drums) - along with Chas Carlson (keyboards) and Howard Messer (bass). Formed in 1979, the band released two albums on Warner Bros. Records: Couchois in 1979, and Nasty Hardware in 1980.

== History ==
The Couchois brothers began playing in bands together while in junior high school in Huntsville, Alabama during the 1960s. In 1971, Chris and Pat joined Ratchell with bassist Howard Messer and former Steppenwolf guitarist Larry Byrom. The group released two albums for Decca Records before splitting up.

A few years later, Mike Couchois joined his brothers and Messer and Chas Carlson to form the group Couchois. The band signed with Warner Bros. Records and released their self-titled debut album, which peaked at #170 on the Billboard 200 in 1979. The album featured a guest appearance by Chuck Findley. A review of the album in a 1979 issue of Billboard called Couchois a "solid debut LP" with a "very melodic rock sound" and "noteworthy" keyboard work. Pete Bishop of Pittsburgh Press said it was an "enjoyable and promising debut album" and compared the band's style to that of Creedence Clearwater Revival and Orleans. In 1980, Couchois released their second album, Nasty Hardware, which included their song "Roll The Dice", which was later covered by such bands as Rage, Charlie and John Verity. Rolling Stone gave the album a one-star rating and characterized Couchois as an "aggravatingly lame soft-rock quintet that sports three brothers and zero talent."

After the band dissolved, Chris wrote and played drums on the Eric Burdon song "Heart Attack" for the 1982 film Comeback. The song later featured on many of Burdon's compilations, such as The Best of Eric Burdon, Soldier of Fortune, as well as on the original album Power Company, which also featured Snuffy Walden, Ronnie Barron and Terry Wilson. Couchois' "Visibility Zero" is also featured on the 2006 compilation Munich Rock Disco.

== Discography ==
| Title | Album details | Peak chart positions |
| Title | Album details | US |
|---|---|---|
| Couchois | Released: 1979; Label: Warner Bros.; Format: LP | 170 |
| Nasty Hardware | Released: 1980; Label: Warner Bros.; Format: LP | — |
