= Harem Scarem =

Canadian hard rock/melodic hard rock band

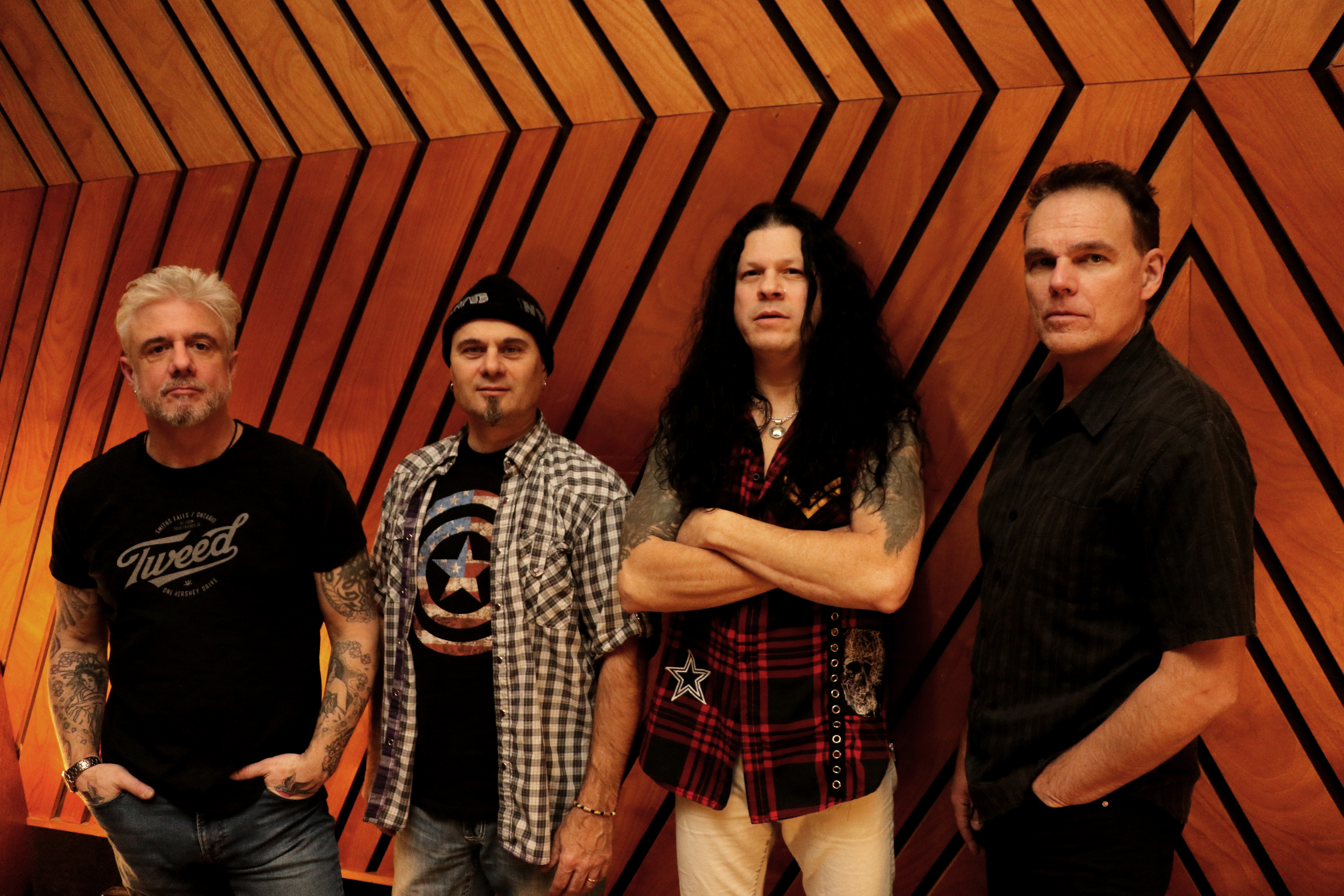
- Harem Scarem circa 2022

Background information
- Also known as: Rubber
- Origin: Toronto, Ontario, Canada
- Genres: Hair metal, rock, hard rock, arena rock
- Years active: 1987–2008, 2013–present
- Labels: Warner Bros.; Frontiers; Vespa Music Group; WEA International
- Members: Harry Hess; Pete Lesperance; Darren Smith; Creighton Doane
- Past members: Barry Donaghy; Stan Miczek; Mike Gionet
- Website: www.haremscarem.net

Harem Scarem is a Canadian hard rock/melodic hard rock band from Toronto, Ontario. Harem Scarem initially (the early 1990s) achieved popularity in their native Canada and Japan. The band was active from 1987 to 2008, and again from 2013 after reforming. Throughout their career, they have released 16 studio albums (including two releases as Rubber in Canada, but not the vinyl re-issue in 2023 of Mood Swings), plus numerous live and compilation albums, and a re-record of Mood Swings (as Mood Swings II) in 2013. Totals record sales are in excess of one million worldwide.

== History ==
=== 1987–2008 ===
Harem Scarem was formed in 1987 by guitarist Pete Lesperance and singer Harry Hess, formerly of Blind Vengeance who had recorded two heavy metal albums in the 1980s. The name Harem Scarem was based on a Bugs Bunny cartoon. The initial Harem Scarem lineup was completed by Darren Smith (drums) and Mike Gionet (bass). This lineup recorded a demo CD in 1990, which garnered them attention since most demos at the time would be on cassette tape only. On the strength of this demo they were signed to Warner Music and recorded their first album. The demo CD was initially sold to fans.

In 1991, Harem Scarem released their self-titled debut album, which charted at No. 68 on the Canadian album chart. The album includes guest appearances by fellow Canadian stars such as Ray Coburn of Honeymoon Suite, Carl Dixon of Coney Hatch, and Paul MacAusland of Haywire. A hit single from the album, "Slowly Slipping Away", charted at No. 25 on the Canadian singles chart, and there were also two minor chart hits; "Honestly" and "Love Reaction". The following year, Harem Scarem was able to gain some notoriety when eight songs from their debut album Harem Scarem were predominantly featured in the Canadian teen series Degrassi Junior High, and Degrassi High's farewell television movie, School's Out. The album was followed by the EP Acoustic Sessions which features recordings of selected songs from their self-titled album and was only sold in Canada, having just 500 units available.

The band released their second album in 1993, Mood Swings, which had a harder sound to it when compared to their first album. Mood Swings featured the recorded vocal debut of drummer Smith on the song "Sentimental Blvd". An accepted fan favorite, Mood Swings charted at No. 83 on the Canadian charts. The album's lead off single was "No Justice", and this managed to chart at No. 59 in Canada, while the other two singles from the album failed to chart. Mood Swings caused the band to gain popularity in Japan, and the band's previous album was quickly issued in that country the following year. This was followed by a live and acoustic EP, titled Live & Acoustic. In 1995, the band released their third album Voice of Reason. The album introduced a change in the band's musical style, and was darker in sound than the first two albums. The song "Blue" was released as a promotional single and had a music video for it, however it failed to chart. Bassist Mike Gionet departed after Voice of Reason for personal reasons and was replaced by former Blu Bones member Barry Donaghy.

The next two albums, Karma Cleansing (which was released as Believe in Japan) and Big Bang Theory, saw Harem Scarem 'modernizing' their sound. Barry Donaghy also made his lead vocal debut with Harem Scarem on "Sometimes I Wish" from Big Bang Theory. Both albums and the singles from them again failed to chart. In 1998, the band released the single "So Blind".

=== Rubber ===
In 1999, Harem Scarem changed their name to Rubber, and released two albums under that name in Canada. However, they still used the name Harem Scarem in Japan and the rest of the world. Pete Lesperance made his recorded lead vocal debut on the song "Trip" from the self-titled Rubber CD. They made a music video for "Sunshine", which had actors that looked like Jay and Silent Bob, and parodied movies which were released around that time, such as American Pie. The second album under the Rubber name, Ultra Feel, featured their new drummer Creighton Doane (brother of Melanie Doane) replacing Darren Smith. Smith briefly switched to guitar and joined Helix as a touring musician. The Rubber name was soon dropped and during 2002 the band switched back to their original name, Harem Scarem.

2002's Weight of the World, which was released as a Rubber album in some markets, harkened back to the earlier sound of Mood Swings and was their first Harem Scarem album to be released on the Frontiers label. Weight of the World was the bands first album to have a 'proper' release within Europe. Weight of the World was followed in 2003 by Higher. The album's sound was more of a combination of classic melodic rock with a modern production. The album featured the power ballad "Higher". 2003 also saw the release of lead singer Harry Hess' debut solo album Just Another Day. In 2004, Pete Lesperance released his debut solo album Down In It (re-recorded with Mike Turner and released under the band name Fair Ground in 2006).

Continuing their prolific output of studio albums, 2005's Overload was followed by Human Nature in 2007. The Japanese version of Overload features a cover of the AC/DC classic, "You Shook Me All Night Long". On July 19, 2007, lead singer Harry Hess announced that Harem Scarem "will make one more studio record, and then after 20 years we have decided to move on to other things". That final album, Hope, was released in July 2008.

Regarding the breakup and a possible reunion, Creighton Doane said:

There were no falling outs [sic] or personality problems, it was more a matter of time. People were getting busy with other projects and I think it just became one of those things where lives go on and you want to do something else...Go out while it's not a complete mess and you're still making good music.

Maybe there'll be a great opportunity for a reunion, who knows? Everyone in the band gets along famously, we work together all the time, so there's a sense that it's not completely over. But still, it was the best thing to do.''

=== 2008–2013 ===
On June 21, 2010, Frontiers Records announced a new studio project called First Signal featuring ex-Harem Scarem members Harry Hess and Darren Smith. The album was released on August 27, 2010. Much of the Harem Scarem back catalogue was reissued in September 2010, and featuring bonus tracks. Included in the reissue program were albums formerly only available in Japan, such as B-Side Collection, Rocks, and Ballads. In December 2012, it was announced that a reunited Harem Scarem would headline the 10th Firefest festival in Nottingham, UK, in October 2013. Harry Hess had been approached by Firefest's promotor to perform the Mood Swings album in its entirety for its twentieth year anniversary. The band regrouped and performed at Firefest.

=== 2013–2019 ===
Following the October 2013 Firefest appearance, Harem Scarem re-recorded the Mood Swings album, adding three newly written 'in-keeping' tracks to Mood Swings II, "World Gone To Piece's", "Anarchy", and "A Brighter day". The new album was released by Frontiers. A European tour was also scheduled. Following the reformation, and in an interview with Classic Rock Revisited, of Harem Scarem's first ten or so years and Harem Scarem essentially arriving alongside grunge in the US, Harry Hess commented:

"Everything was two or three years too late when you think of it from a timing perspective. If the first record would have come out in the mid-80s then that would have been better. Mood Swings was too late and Voice of Reason should have hit when Grunge hit. We were always late to the party and never smart enough to know what was coming… most people aren't. That wave knocked out bands like Foreigner. We were playing with them and we found out they got dropped from their record company. We thought, What does that mean for us? We were a long haired rock band that looked like we belonged on a Bon Jovi tour. We were playing pop stuff in the beginning and then we found more interesting stuff with Mood Swings. We loved the darker stuff, we really did. They were honest mistakes based on us not knowing anything. Our manager at the time was our age and just a friend. Our A&R guy was on his first job. We never had anyone in our camp sit us down and say, "This is what you're doing and this is why it could be a problem." Nobody ever told us anything like that. We learned it the hard way. I should write a book on how to sabotage your career. We changed the name of the band, we did pop records, we did metal records… we did it all. It was a great education and I don't really regret any of it. If you are asking why it didn’t work I have to tell you that I am surprised that it worked as well as it did. It was self-sabotage almost every step of the way from a career choice. We were never on the cutting edge; we were always outside looking in. Since that was the case, we always just thought that we could just make the records that we wanted to make and be happy and like the music that we are doing. That is what we did, but I can look back at it and see that many strange things went on and we made many mistakes that were defeatist to us having a career. We changed our name to Rubber at one point and that was totally a very bizarre thing. Towards the end, we were probably going through the motions; we had not been a band for about five years."

On September 9, 2014, Harry Hess and Pete Lesperance announced they would be recording the band's thirteenth studio album (total not including Mood Swings II), entitled Thirteen. Preorders were made available for 13 weeks via a Pledge Music page.

In 2014, Darren Smith emerged as the lead vocalist for former Ozzy Osbourne guitarist Jake E. Lee's new band, Red Dragon Cartel. A second First Signal album, One Step Over The Line was released by Frontiers in 2016.

In February 2017, it was announced that Harem Scarem would appear at Rockingham Festival 2017, this to be held at Nottingham Trent University, UK, between October 20 and 22, 2017, the band scheduled to appear on Saturday 21st. In March 2017, it was disclosed that to mark their 30th year Harem Scarem's 14th studio album, United, would be released by Frontiers Records on May 12. The 11-track album featured Harry Hess (lead vocals, keyboards), Pete Lesperance (guitars, bass, keyboards), long-time drummer Creighton Doane, and backing vocals from original drummer Darren Smith (who played live drums for the band on tour dates).

In the Q3 of 2018, Harem Scarem began writing their 15th studio album which was set to be released in 2020. In Q3 2019, the then to be named 15th studio album was in the process of being mastered by Harry Hess of HBOMB Mastering. Also during 2019 the third First Signal album, Line of Fire was released by Frontiers.

=== 2020–present ===
Change the World, Harem Scarem's 15th studio album was released on March 4, 2020. Several versions of the album have been released including a deluxe edition featuring a DVD and bonus material. From the album, Frontiers released three promotional videos, these for "Change The World", "Aftershock" and "Death Of Me". On January 16, 2021 on their official Facebook page the band teased that work had started on their 16th studio album.

On February 7, 2022, on the band's Facebook page it was revealed that the fourth First Signal album Closer to the Edge would be released on April 8, 2022. An initial music video "Don't Let It End" had been posted by Frontiers Music on YouTube on February 3, and a second "Show Me The Way" was posted on March 16, 2022.

In March 2023, the band announced they would be releasing a 30th anniversary edition of the Mood Swings album as Mood Swings Bundle - Limited Edition. The package included a 180-gram purple LP, a CD with five bonus acoustic tracks, and numerous other items of physical and digital memorabilia and similar. Retail price was $89.95.

In an interview with YouTube channel Sleeve Saturday on February 9, 2025, Hess confirmed that the band would be looking at some way of 'celebrating' the 35th anniversary of the bands' self-titled first album, this released August 6, 1991.

On April 24, 2025, the band commenced a European tour in association with Frontiers Music that had been announced in December 2024. The tour commenced in Madrid, Spain and concluded in the Netherlands on May 4, with the sole UK date being at the Underworld (Camden London) on April 28. The tour included a single night (April 27) at the Frontiers Rock Festival in Milan, Italy. Around this time the band announced on social media that new music was coming soon from the band, and on February 4, Frontiers released a lyric video single Reliving History, from the pending new album Chasing Euphoria, the release date for which (April 25, 2025) was confirmed on March 28 by Frontiers Music. In a later interview, Harry Hess confirmed that Reliving History was not considered a single, and that the first single from the album was "Chasing Euphoria", this released on February 24. This was followed on March 25 by a second single, "Better The Devil You Know", and on the April 25 the third single, "In A Bad Way".

Also in April 2025, the band released Harem Scarem Best of Anthology Vol. 1 on vinyl to coincide with Record Store Day Canada. This exclusive vinyl release features a collection of singles from the band’s first decade together, with all tracks mastered for vinyl by Harry Hess.

On 5 July 2026, Keely Smith, daughter of drummer Darren Smith, announced on The Metal Voice’s Facebook page that her father had been diagnosed with early-onset dementia/Alzheimer’s. The band responded on the same page: "As bandmates and friends, we fully support Darren, in the present as well as whatever his future holds, as I'm sure all of you do."

== Band members ==
Current

- Harry Hess – lead & backing vocals, rhythm guitar, keyboards
- Pete Lesperance – guitars, backing vocals
- Darren Smith – drums, vocals (studio/touring)
- Creighton Doane – drums, vocals (studio)
- Mike Vassos – bass, vocals

Former

- Mike Gionet – bass, vocals
- Barry Donaghy – bass, vocals
- Stan Miczek – bass

== Discography ==
=== Studio albums ===
- Harem Scarem (Release date - August 6, 1991)
- Mood Swings (Release date - June 11, 1993)
- Voice of Reason (Release date - September 25, 1995)
- Karma Cleansing (1997) (released as Believe in Japan)
- Big Bang Theory (1998)
- Rubber (1999) (as Harem Scarem for Japan only)
- Ultra Feel (2001) (as Rubber)
- Weight of the World (2002)
- Higher (2003)
- Overload (2005)
- Human Nature (2006)
- Hope (2008)
- Mood Swings II (2013) (re-record of Mood Swings + bonus tracks - not classed as 13th album release)
- Thirteen (2014)
- United (2017)
- Change the World (2020)
- Mood Swings (2023) (30th anniversary bundle, limited edition purple vinyl - not classed as 16th album release)
- Chasing Euphoria (2025) (release date April 25, 2025)

=== Live albums ===
- Live in Japan (1996)
- Live Ones (1997)
- Live at The Siren (1998)
- Last Live (2000)
- Live at the Gods 2002 (2002)
- Live at Firefest (2005)
- Raw and Rare (2008)

=== Compilation albums ===
- The Best Of Harem Scarem (1998)
- B-Side Collection (1998)
- Ballads (1999)
- Rocks (2001)
- The Very Best of Harem Scarem (2002)
- The Early Years (2003)
- The Essentials (2005)
- This Ain't Over – Best of the Avalon Years (2009)
- Harem Scarem - The Ultimate Collection (2019)
- Harem Scarem - Best of Anthology Vol.1 (2025)

=== Extended plays ===
- Acoustic Sessions (1991)
- Live and Acoustic (1994)
- Melodic Rock (2008)

=== DVDs ===
- Video Hits & More (2002)
- Live at the Gods (2002)
- Raw and Rare (2007)
- Live at the Phoenix (2015)

=== Singles ===
- "Slowly Slipping Away" - CAN #25 (1991)
- "Love Reaction" (1991)
- "Honestly" - CAN #68 (1992)
- "With a Little Love" (1992)
- "Something to Say" (1992)
- "No Justice" (1993)
- "Change Comes Around" (1993)
- "If There Was a Time" (1994)
- "Die Off Hard" (1997)
- "Rain" (1997)
- "New Religion" (1998)
- "What I Do" (1998)
- "Turn Around" (1998)
- "So Blind" (1998)
- "Chasing Euphoria" (2025)
- "Better The Devil You Know" (2025)
- "In A Bad Way" (2025)
