= New Girl Now =

1984 song by Honeymoon Suite

Single by Honeymoon Suite

from the album Honeymoon Suite
- Released: 1984
- Recorded: 1983
- Genre: Hard rock, glam metal
- Length: 3:37
- Label: WEA Canada
- Songwriter(s): Dermot Grehan
- Producer(s): Tom Treumuth

Honeymoon Suite singles chronology
"New Girl Now" (1984)	"Bad Attitude" (1985)

"New Girl Now" is a song by the Canadian rock band Honeymoon Suite. It was written by Derry Grehan, and released as a single in 1984, from the album Honeymoon Suite. The single reached No. 23 in Canada (2 weeks) and No. 57 in the United States.

In 2015 Grehan received a SOCAN Classic Award based on the song having been played more than 100,000 times on Canadian radio.

== Background and production ==
Derry Grehan wrote "New Girl Now" after he had just ended a relationship and moved to college.

Honeymoon Suite were a cover band in the early 1980s, playing popular songs by Billy Idol, A Flock of Seagulls, and other early '80s rock staples at local bars in Ontario. However, guitarist Derry Grehan had written a few songs of his own, which Honeymoon Suite would sneak into the end of their sets after fulfilling their contracts of playing 45 minutes of cover songs at bars. Loyal fans could hear their original songs at the end.

After driving all night from a gig in Elliot Lake to their producer's house in Toronto, the band recorded a sleep-deprived demo of "New Girl Now" the next morning, and in 1983 entered a demo of the song to a local contest put on by Toronto rock station Q107. They won that year and this led to a multi album deal with WEA Canada after being signed by Bob Roper. It won, garnering record label interest. They booked Phase One Studios in Toronto, and were so excited to finally play their own music that they dashed out their whole album in two weeks. Grehan and singer Johnnie Dee said the band's nervousness and energy can be heard on the vocals in the final recording.

== Legacy ==
The song is played in the episode of The Kids in the Hall: Death Comes to Town "The Stages of Grief" during the bar scene where Death is trying to order a drink. It also features in the Bones episode "The Woman in Limbo". Also played in the Miami Vice episode "One Eyed Jack". The song is part of the opening scene in the 2008 horror film Gutterballs.
