= Derry Grehan =

Canadian guitarist (born 1957)

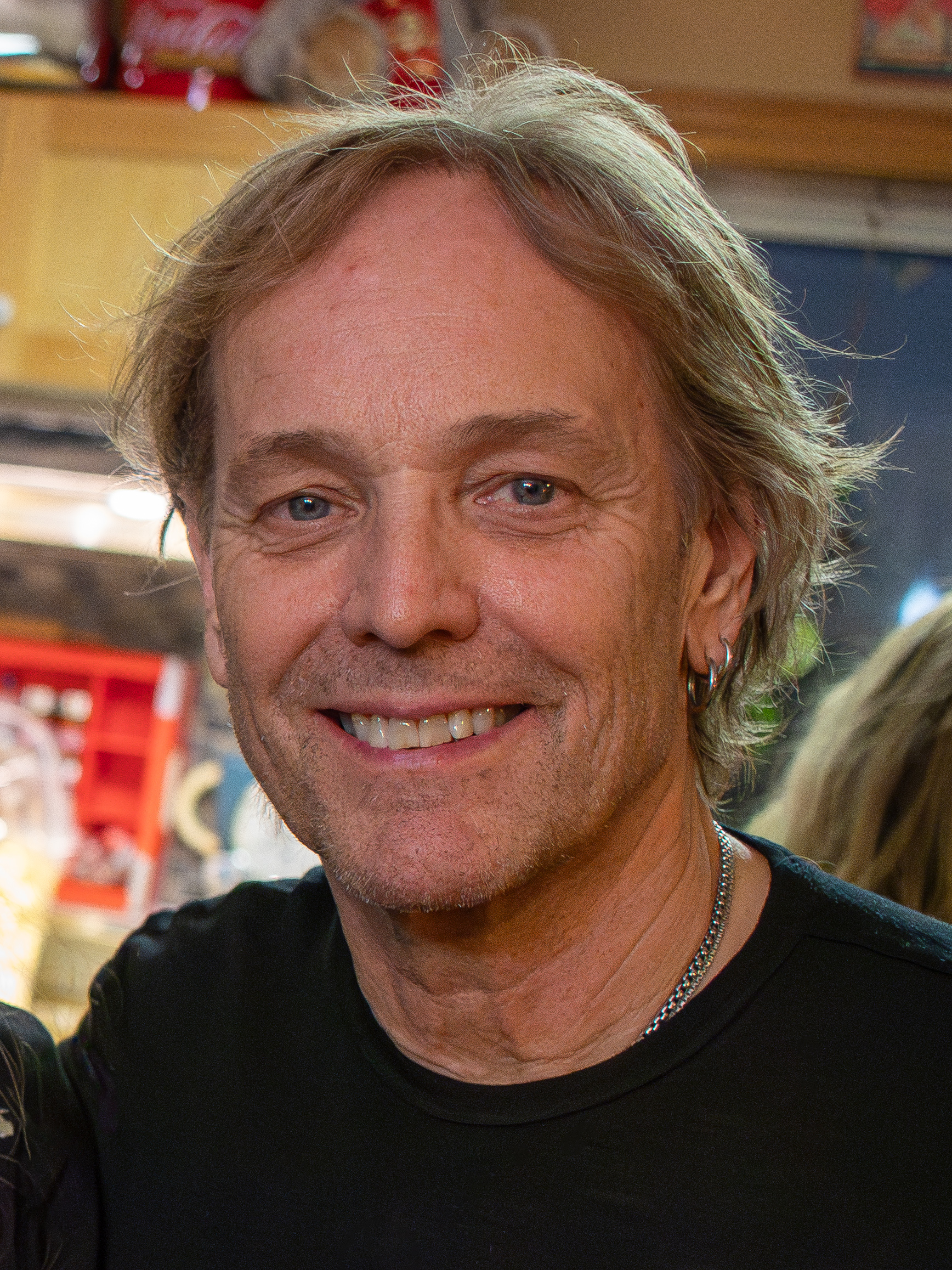
- Grehan in 2025

Background information
- Born: Dermot Fergus Grehan; July 10, 1957 (age 69); St. Catharines, Ontario, Canada
- Genres: Rock, hard rock
- Occupation: Musician
- Instrument: Guitar
- Years active: 1974-present

Dermot Fergus "Derry" Grehan (born July 10, 1957) is a Canadian guitarist best known as a member of the rock band Honeymoon Suite. The band was co-founded by Johnnie Dee, keyboardist and vocalist Brad Bent, and drummer Mike Lengyell in 1981.

== Biography ==
Born in St. Catharines, Ontario, Canada, Grehan began playing piano and switched to guitar at age 11. His early influences included Deep Purple, Jimi Hendrix and Santana. Grehan recorded his first single at 17, with a band known as Stytch.

Grehan attended Fanshawe College in London, Ontario, and received a diploma in Recorded Music Production. During this time he wrote "New Girl Now" which would later become one of Honeymoon Suite's biggest hits. After moving to Toronto he hooked up with singer Johnnie Dee in 1982 and together they recruited the other members to form Honeymoon Suite. Their subsequent demo recording of "New Girl Now" was entered into a contest sponsored by radio station Q107 and they won first prize. This exposure led to a record deal with Warner Music and the band released their first self-titled album in 1984.

Honeymoon Suite (named after the band members' hometown of Niagara Falls, Ontario) sold over 300,000 copies of their debut in Canada and toured North America and Europe extensively. They were the opening act for many touring acts including Heart, ZZ Top, and Journey. The band released two more albums during the 1980s (The Big Prize and Racing After Midnight) and received much exposure when their songs were featured in the hit TV show Miami Vice. Grehan even played the lead role in a 1986 Pepsi commercial, air-guitaring a solo originally done by Vinnie Moore.

Honeymoon suite released three more albums in the 1990s and continued to tour. Into the 2000s, the band remained active with more releases including 2008's Clifton Hill with Grehan on lead guitar.

Grehan relocated to Illinois with his wife and children, and besides working with Honeymoon Suite, was involved locally with 2 side projects: The Dexrays, with Dexter Hebert (drums) and Rich Leigh (bass); and LoveJunk.

In 2015, Grehan received three SOCAN Classic Awards based on his songs "New Girl Now", "Burning in Love", and "What Does It Take" having been played more than 100,000 times each on Canadian radio.
