= Pete Lesperance =

Canadian guitarist, singer, songwriter, and producer

- Born: Peter Lesperance; October 13, 1968 (age 57)
- Origin: Scarborough, Ontario, Canada
- Genres: Hard rock, glam metal
- Occupation: Musician
- Instrument: Guitar
- Years active: 1987–present

Pete Lesperance is a Canadian guitarist, singer, songwriter, and producer best known as the lead guitarist for the Canadian hard rock band Harem Scarem. Lesperance was born October 13, 1968, in Scarborough, Ontario. Lesperance was a guitarist in the Oshawa metal band Minotaur before forming Harem Scarem with Blind Vengeance vocalist Harry Hess in 1987.

Lesperance's solo album, Down In It, was released in 2004 in Japan only, where Harem Scarem had their main fanbase. With fellow guitarist Mike Turner (ex-Our Lady Peace), they put together the band Fair Ground. Together they released a new version of Down In It.

Lesperance's own studio, Hope Songs, is located in Toronto, Ontario. Lesperance has produced many bands, including the rock band One Short. He is currently finishing up albums for Canadian Idol contestants Aaron Walpole and Suzi Rawn.

His influences include Eddie Van Halen, Brian May, Nuno Bettencourt and Steve Vai.

== Discography ==
=== With Minotaur ===
- 83-87 (EP) (2004) -material was recorded in the early 80s

=== With Harem Scarem ===
- Harem Scarem (1991)
- Mood Swings (1993)
- Voice of Reason (1995)
- Karma Cleansing (1997)
- Big Bang Theory (1998)
- Weight of the World (2002)
- Higher (2003)
- Overload (2005)
- Human Nature (2006)
- Hope (2008)
- Mood Swings II (2013)
- Thirteen (2014)
- United (2017)
- Change The World (2020)
- Chasing Euphoria (2025)

=== With Rubber ===
- Rubber (1999)
- Ultra Feel (2001)

=== Solo ===
- Down In It (2004)
- Fade Into Stars (2012)

=== Fair Ground ===
Fair Ground
- Origin: Toronto, Ontario, Canada
- Genres: Alternative rock
- Years active: 2005–2008
- Past members: Pete Lesperance; Mike Turner; Creighton Doane

Fair Ground was an alternative rock collaboration formed by Pete Lesperance and Mike Turner (Our Lady Peace). Originally Turner was to make a guest appearance on Lesperance's solo album, but this developed into Fair Ground's only album, Down In It, which was released on November 6, 2006. Following an internet poll the group released the song "Down In It" as a single. This was followed by "Boy Without A Clue".

- Down In It (2006). Track listing:
1. "Down In It" - 3:40
2. "Automatic" - 3:25
3. "Say You Will" - 3:33
4. "Nameless" - 3:33
5. "What are you Waiting For?" - 3:20
6. "Boy Without a Clue" - 4:03
7. "Skeleton Tree" - 3:47
8. "No Sign of Life" - 3:45
9. "Upside Down" - 3:37
10. "Life Goes On" - 3:17
11. "Life Goes On" (Acoustic Bonus Track) - 3:31

=== Guest appearances and collaborations ===
- Doctor Rock & The Wild Bunch - Eye of the Hurricane (1991) - Guitars
- Doctor Rock & The Wild Bunch - Stark Raving Mad (1994) - Guitars
- Honeymoon Suite - 13 Live (1994) - Engineer, Mixer
- Mystery - Backwards (1995) - Producer (with Harry Hess)
- Lame - Ol' Doctor Bomb (1996) - Producer (With Harry Hess)
- Fall From Grace - Within The Savage Garden (1997) - Guitar technician
- Steve Holliday - Stark Raving Mad (1997) - Guitars
- Xntrik - Focus (1997) - Guitar Technician
- Fiore - Body Electric (1998) - Producer
- Fiore - Today Till' Tomorrow (1998) - Producer (With Harry Hess)
- Rafa Martin - Corazon De Hierro (2000) - Guitars
- Stupid Angel - Stupid Angel (2000) - Producer (With Harry Hess)
- John Boswell - Stranger In The Mirror (2002) - Guitars
- Ken Tamplin - Wake The Nations (2003) - Guitars
- Maureen Leeson - aka MOE (2003) - Guitars
- Billy Klippert - Billy Klippert (2004) - Composer, Guitars
- Brian Tulk - The Pop Machine (2004) - Guitars
- Brian Tulk - Paperweight (2007) - Guitars
- John Grolman - Existence (2009) - Guitars, Backing Vocals
- LORD - Set in Stone (2009) - Guest guitar solo: Track 11: "New Horizons"
- Liberty N' Justice - Light It Up (2010) - Guitars, Backing Vocals: Track 11: "Beautiful Decision"
