= Harry Hess =

Canadian musician and record producer

- Born: Harold Hess; July 5, 1968 (age 58); Oshawa, Ontario, Canada
- Genres: Hard rock, glam metal
- Occupations: Singer, songwriter, record producer
- Instruments: Vocals, guitar, keyboards
- Years active: 1982–present
- Labels: Vespa Music Group & Moreland Music Group (SOCAN)
- Website: http://www.harryhess.net/ http://myspace.com/harryhess/

Harry Hess (born July 5, 1968) is a Canadian record producer, singer and guitarist best known as the frontman for the Canadian hard rock band Harem Scarem.

Hess has used his recording studio (Vespa Music Group) to work with many famous acts, which include: Cancer Bats, Billy Talent, Muse, Three Days Grace, Thornley, My Darkest Days, Rides Again, Simple Plan, Ali Slaight, Our Lady Peace, Kalen Porter, Ryan Malcolm, Sarah Harmer, Julian Austin, Nikki Kerkhof, Great Big Sea, Blue Rodeo, Dean Delannoit, Die Mannequin, Dragonette, Finger 11, RyanDan, and Natalia Druyts. In 2021, he was involved in the Grammy-winning album Mendó by Alex Cuba.

== Discography ==
=== Blind Vengeance ===
- A Taste of Sin (1984)
- Blind Vengeance (1985)

=== Harem Scarem ===
- Harem Scarem (1991)
- Mood Swings (1993)
- Voice of Reason (1995)
- Karma Cleansing / Believe (1997)
- Big Bang Theory (1998)
- Weight of the World (2002)
- Higher (2003)
- Overload (2005)
- Human Nature (2006)
- Hope (2008)
- Mood Swings II (2013)
- Thirteen (2014)
- United (2017)
- Change The World (2020)
- Chasing Euphoria (2025)

=== Rubber ===
- Rubber (1999)
- Ultra Feel (2001)

=== Solo ===
- Just Another Day (2003)
- Living in Yesterday (2012)

=== First Signal ===
- First Signal (2010)
- One Step Over the Line (2016)
- Line of Fire (2019)
- Close to the Edge (2022)
- Face Your Fears (2023)

=== Guest appearances/collaborations ===
- Doctor Rock & The Wild Bunch – Eye of the Hurricane (1991) – Vocals
- Lee Aaron – Some Girls Do (1991) – Background vocals
- Doctor Rock & The Wild Bunch – Stark Raving Mad (1994) – Vocals
- T.O. Joker – Life Goes On (1994) – Engineer, Background vocals
- Xntrik – Kiss the Cow (1994) – Producer
- Honeymoon Suite – 13 Live (1994) – Engineer, Mixer
- Mystery – Backwards (1995) – Producer (with Pete Lesperance), engineer, Mixer
- Lame – Ol' Doctor Bomb (1996) – Producer (with Pete Lesperance)
- Midpoint – Midpoint (1996) – Producer
- Ritual – Hate (1996) – Producer, Mixer
- Dayna Manning – Volume 1 (1997) – Engineer, Background vocals
- Fall From Grace – Within the Savage Garden (1997) – Backing vocals
- Samad – Samad (1997) – Lead vocals: Track 2: "Land of Paradise"
- Steve Holliday – Stark Raving Mad (1997) – Producer, Mixer
- Xntrik – Focus (1997) – Producer
- Fiore – Body Electric (1998) – Producer
- Fiore – Today Till' Tomorrow (1998) – Producer (with Pete Lesperance)
- Fiore – All I Feel (1998) – Producer
- Fiore – The Best Of (1999) – Producer
- Naro – Press Play (2000) – Engineer, Mixer, Keyboards, Vocals
- Rafa Martin – Corazon De Hierro (2000) – Engineer, Backing vocals
- Stupid Angel – Stupid Angel (2000) – Producer (with Pete Lesperance), Mixer, Backing vocals
- Great Big Sea – Sea of No Cares (2002) – Engineer, Mixer
- John Boswell – Stranger in the Mirror (2002) – Mixer
- Frost – Raise Your Fist to Metal (2003) – Lead vocals: Track 1: "Stay"
- Gary Hughes – Once and Future King Part II (2003) Lead vocals: Track 12: "Once and Future King"
- Maureen Leeson – a.k.a. MOE (2003) – Mixer
- Billy Klippert – Billy Klippert (2004) – Producer, composer, backing vocals
- Voices of Rock – MMVII (2007) – Vocals: Track 6: "Irresistible"
- Liberty N' Justice – Light It Up (2010) – Vocals: Track 11: "Beautiful Decision"
- Duke – Duke (2010) – Duet: Track 11: " Into The Sun"
- Shining Line – Shining Line (2010) – Vocals: Track 2: "Amy"
- First Signal – First Signal (2010) – Lead vocals on all tracks
- Magnus Karlsson's Free Fall – Kingdom of Rock (2015) – Lead Vocals: Track 9: "A Heart So Cold"
