= Johnnie Dee =

Canadian musical artist

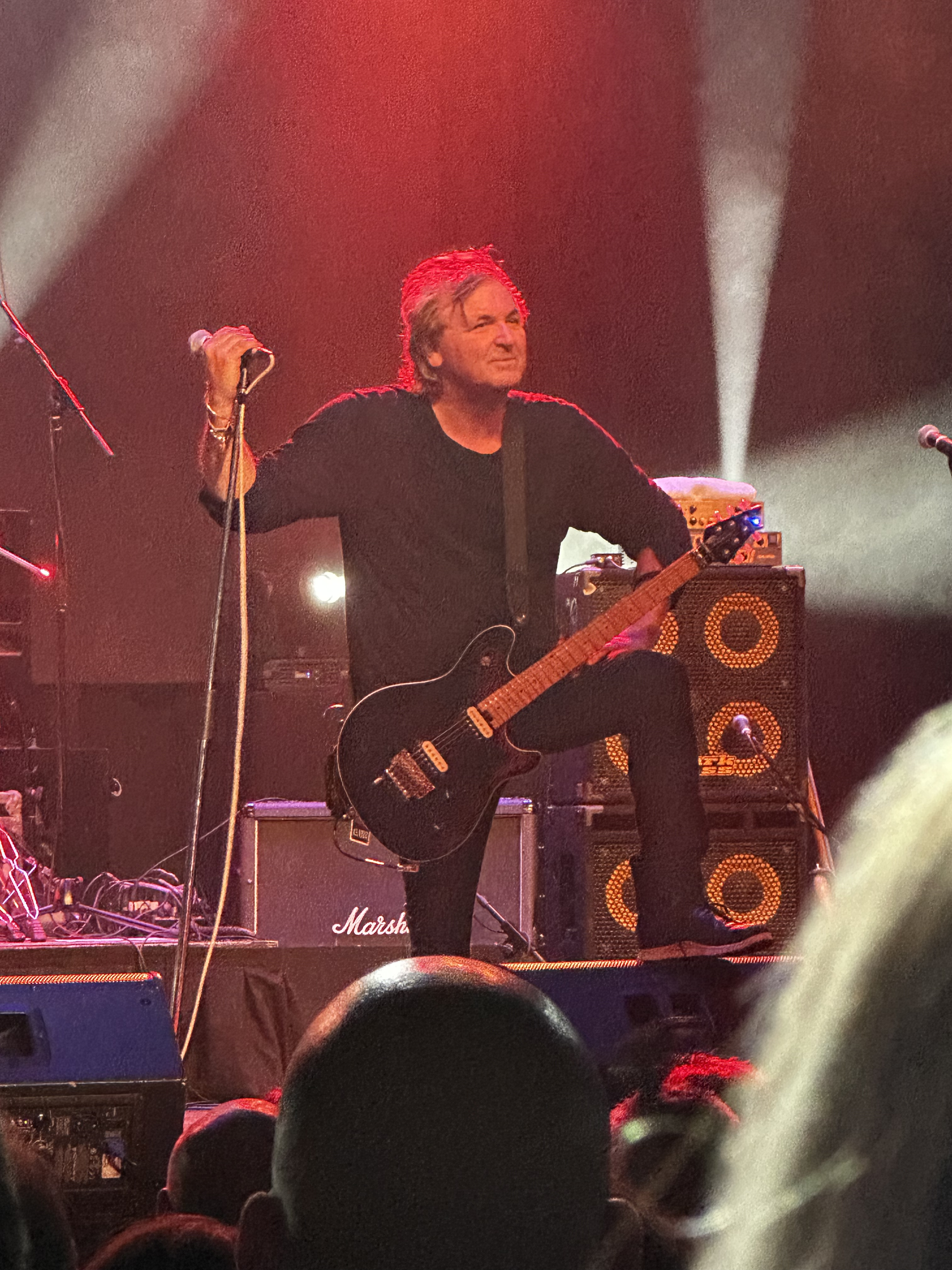
- Dee in 2023

Background information
- Born: John Richard DeGiuli; October 20, 1961 (age 64); Montreal, Quebec, Canada
- Origin: Niagara Falls, Ontario, Canada
- Genre: Rock
- Occupations: Singer, guitarist
- Instruments: Vocals, Guitar
- Years active: 1981–present
- Member of: Honeymoon Suite

John Richard DeGiuli, known as Johnnie Dee, is a Canadian rock vocalist best known as the lead singer for the rock band Honeymoon Suite. Dee (who also plays guitar) and guitarist Derry Grehan formed Honeymoon Suite in Niagara Falls, Ontario, in the early 1980s. Together they produced five studio albums and numerous hits including songs such as "New Girl Now" and "Feel It Again" which were both featured on the Miami Vice TV series. In 1986, Honeymoon Suite won a Juno Award for "Group of the Year" and was also nominated that same year for "Album of the Year".

In 2004, Dee released a solo album entitled Songs in Dee, which was produced independently in Canada. Most of the tracks were co-written with Rob Laidlaw who also produced the album. A single for "Out Here" was released, with a corresponding music video.
