= Honeymoon Suite =

Canadian rock band

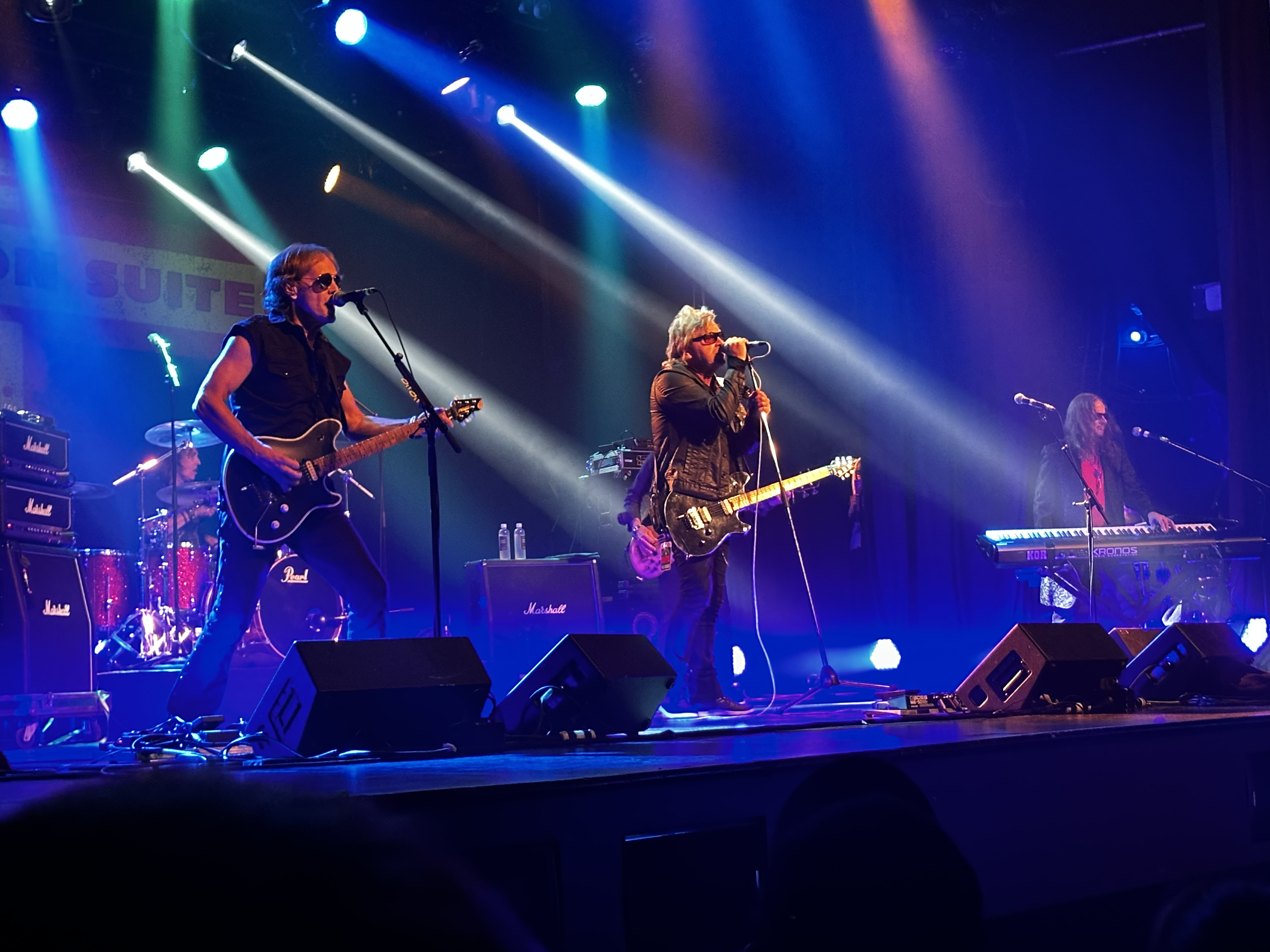
- Honeymoon Suite performing in Belleville, ON, in 2023

Background information
- Origin: Niagara Falls, Ontario, Canada
- Genres: Hard rock, AOR, glam metal, new wave
- Years active: 1981–present
- Labels: WEA Canada, Warner
- Members: Johnnie Dee; Derry Grehan; Dave Betts; Gary Lalonde; Peter Nunn
- Past members: Brad Bent; Bret Carrigan; Ray Coburn; Randy Cooke; Creighton Doane; Rob Laidlaw; Mike Lengyell; Stan Miczek; Rob Preuss; Dan Todd; Andrew Thoms; Reiss Robinson; Roger Habel Jr
- Website: honeymoonsuite.com

Honeymoon Suite is a Canadian rock band formed in 1981 in Niagara Falls, Ontario. The band's name was a nod to the title of Niagara Falls as the "unofficial honeymoon capital of the world".

== History ==
=== 1981–1985 ===
The band was originally formed in 1981 by Johnnie Dee (vocals, guitar), Brad Bent (keyboards, vocals), and Mike Lengyell (drums, formerly with The Diodes). By 1983, the line-up changed, with Dee (the only original remaining member) now on rhythm guitar and lead vocals, along with new recruits Derry Grehan on lead guitar and Dave Betts on drums, both of whom had recorded two albums as members of Toronto-based new wave group Steve Blimkie and the Reason. Grehan became the band's primary songwriter, and penned "New Girl Now," which won them an unsigned band contest put on by Toronto radio station Q107.

Various keyboard players and bassists came and left during this time, but on the strength of "New Girl Now," WEA Canada signed the band to the label. Ray Coburn was added as a permanent new member on keyboards as the sessions got underway for the group's debut LP, but the band still had no bass player so bassist Brian Brackstone was recruited as a session player. Brackstone played on the entire album; bassist Gary Lalonde (formerly with Rose and Toronto) was added to the line-up after the album was completed and appeared in the album's group photos and played with the band live.

The band's self-titled debut album, produced by Tom Treumuth, was released in June 1984. The album featured four charting hits in Canada: a completely re-recorded version of "New Girl Now," "Burning In Love," "Wave Babies," and "Stay In the Light." "New Girl Now" was also Honeymoon Suite's first single to reach the top-50 in the United States.

Their follow-up album, The Big Prize, produced by Bruce Fairbairn, was equally successful in Canada with four more hits: "Bad Attitude," "Feel It Again," "What Does It Take," and "All Along You Knew." Grehan still wrote the lion's share of the band's material, but Dee and Coburn also contributed songs to this album; "Feel It Again", a Coburn composition, reached the Top 40 in the US, while Grehan's "What Does It Take" reached No. 52, buoyed by its inclusion on the soundtrack for the John Cusack film One Crazy Summer. In 1989, "Bad Attitude" was featured in the series finale of Miami Vice, played during a Ferrari driving segment that mirrored one from the series' pilot episode, continuing throughout Crockett and Tubbs' final battle.

=== 1986–2001 ===
In 1986, keyboardist Ray Coburn left the band, replaced by Rob Preuss of Burlington, Ontario-based Spoons. Also during 1986, the band produced the track "Those Were the Days" for the Charlie Sheen film The Wraith.

In the spring of 1987, the band performed the title track for the Mel Gibson film Lethal Weapon, which was composed by Michael Kamen. In the winter of 1987, the band started work on their third album in L.A. Unfortunately, Johnnie Dee was hit by a car at LAX airport, breaking his leg in several places and required surgery to insert a ten-inch pin to help the leg heal properly. While Dee was recovering in the hospital, one-time Doobie Brothers member Michael McDonald was brought in to help out with the recording sessions; he wrote lyrics and sang back up on "Long Way Back," a forthcoming track for their next album.

In 1988, their third album was finally released: Racing After Midnight, produced by Ted Templeman (of Van Halen fame) and Jeff Hendrickson. That album made the top 10 in Canada, but was not as successful in the U.S. Singles included "Love Changes Everything," "Looking Out for Number One," "Cold Look" (Europe only), and "It's Over Now." By now, while Grehan was still the primary songwriter, Dee and Preuss frequently co-wrote with Grehan.

In 1989, the band released their first greatest hits compilation, The Singles, which included two new charting singles in Canada: "Still Loving You" and "Long Way," both written by Grehan. Preuss left and Coburn rejoined the band in time to embark on "The Singles" tour, which would turn out to be the last tour featuring the band's classic line-up until 2007.

By 1991, Lalonde and Betts had left the band, and were replaced by Steve Webster (from Billy Idol's band) on bass, and Jorn Anderson (from Fludd and Alannah Myles) on drums. The band returned to the studio to craft Monsters Under the Bed with Paul Northfield producing and the team of Grehan/Coburn/Dee was responsible for the songwriting. Singles "Say You Don't Know Me" and "The Road" were moderately successful in Canada.

Ray Coburn left the band again after the release of this album and was replaced on keyboards by Peter Nunn. Jorn Anderson also left the band during this time and was replaced by drummer Creighton Doane (from Harem Scarem) for the Monsters Under the Bed Tour. Creighton continued to play drums with the band for next few years, appearing on their first live album 13 Live released in 1995.

The band continued to tour in the 1990s, although many line-up changes continued to occur, with only Dee and Grehan remaining as the consistent members. Sass Jordan bassist Stan Miczek joined in 1998 for the first of his 3 two-year stints with the band.

=== 2002–present ===
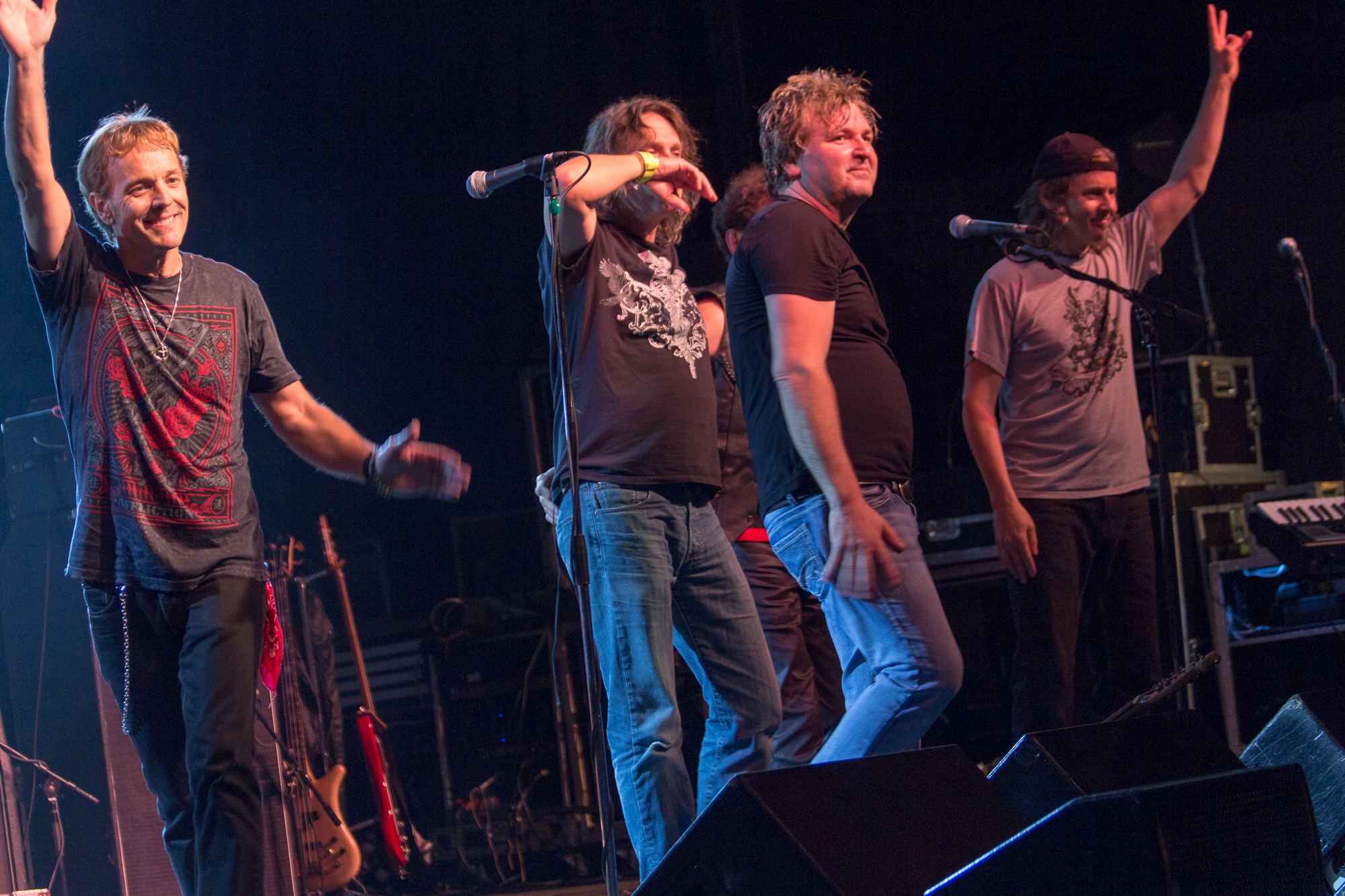
Honeymoon Suite in Burlington, ON in 2013

In 2002, they released their first new studio album in 11 years, Lemon Tongue. Playing on the album were Grehan and Dee, who were by now the group's only official members, and who also wrote all the songs as a team. Also appearing on Lemon Tongue were Peter Nunn and Gary Brent on keyboards; Rob Laidlaw on bass; and Randy Cooke on drums. The album was released on an independent label and leaned towards a more artistic and adventurous direction than their previous rock releases. The European release of this album was titled Dreamland and featured many track changes, dropping five songs and adding four others, including a remake of their 1989 Canadian hit "Still Lovin' You." The credited band on the Dreamland album (and presumably the band that recorded the new tracks) consisted of Dee, Grehan, Laidlaw, Nunn and new drummer Bret Carrigan.

In 2004, Dee released a solo album (Songs in Dee) featuring backing by the other members of Honeymoon Suite, along with guest musicians such as Kim Mitchell and Rik Emmett.

In 2006, the band released another greatest hits collection entitled Feel It Again: An Anthology, a 2-CD set featuring most of the band's singles, selected album tracks, and rare and unreleased material.

In June 2007, the band officially announced the return of a reunited classic line-up of Johnnie Dee, Derry Grehan, Ray Coburn, Gary Lalonde, and Dave Betts. The band toured extensively throughout Canada in 2007 and 2008. However, only Johnnie Dee and Derry Grehan appeared on the new 2008 CD Clifton Hill, produced by Tom Treumuth (who produced the self-titled Honeymoon Suite debut album in 1984), and named after the famous landmark in the centre of the tourist activity in Niagara Falls. The album was released in Canada in late September 2008 on Koch Records and subsequently by Italian melodic rock label Frontiers Records on October 10, 2008. The new album is described by guitarist Derry Grehan as "somewhat of a return musically to the sound that we had in the '80s."

In 2009, the band continued to tour Canada and select Northeastern United States cities. However, on September 1, 2009, it was announced that the band had again parted ways with original keyboardist Ray Coburn. Peter Nunn returned to the band's line-up to replace him for the second time. The band made an appearance at Firefest 6 Nottingham, England in October 2009.

On November 18, 2016, Honeymoon Suite released a 9 track EP, the first new music in 8 years, titled Hands Up on PledgeMusic website.

In February 2017, it was announced that Honeymoon Suite would appear at Rockingham Festival 2017, this to be held at Nottingham Trent University, UK, between October 20 and 22, 2017, the band scheduled to appear on Friday 20th. In the months approaching Rockingham 2017, the band cancelled their show to pursue a different opportunity. Their slot was replaced by John Parr.

On September 26, 2019, the band released their new single "Tell Me What You Want" on YouTube. On 19 June 2020, they issued another single entitled "Find What You're Looking For."

On February 16, 2024, Honeymoon Suite released their new album entitled Alive through Frontiers Music.

On July 25, 2025, Honeymoon Suite released the new album titled Wake Me Up When The Sun Goes Down on Frontiers Records.

== Discography ==
=== Studio albums ===
- Honeymoon Suite (1984)
- The Big Prize (1986)
- Racing After Midnight (1988)
- Monsters Under the Bed (1991)
- Lemon Tongue (2001)
- Dreamland (2002)
- Clifton Hill (2008)
- Alive (2024)
- Wake Me Up When The Sun Goes Down (2025)

=== Live albums ===
- 13 Live (1995)
- HMS Live at the Gods (2005)

=== Compilation albums ===
- The Singles (1989)
- The Essentials (2005)
- Feel It Again: An Anthology (2006)

=== Extended plays ===
- Hands Up (2017)

=== Singles ===
Title	Release	Peak chart positions			Album
Title	Release	US	US Rock	CAN	Album
"New Girl Now"	1984	57	7	23	Honeymoon Suite
"Burning in Love"	1984	—	47	75	Honeymoon Suite
"Stay in the Light"	1984	—	—	44	Honeymoon Suite
"Wave Babies"	1984	—	—	59	Honeymoon Suite
"Bad Attitude"	1985	—	22	—	The Big Prize
"Feel It Again"	1986	34	8	16	The Big Prize
"What Does It Take"	1986	52	38	21	The Big Prize
"All Along You Knew"	1986	—	—	65	The Big Prize
"Lethal Weapon"	1987	—	—	54	Racing After Midnight
"Love Changes Everything"	1988	91	13	9	Racing After Midnight
"Lookin' Out for Number One"	1988	—	—	33	Racing After Midnight
"Other Side of Midnight"	1988	—	—	—	Racing After Midnight
"It's Over Now"	1988	—	—	40	Racing After Midnight
"Cold Look"	1988	—	—	—	Racing After Midnight
"Still Lovin' You"	1989	—	—	33	The Singles
"Long Way"	1990	—	—	87	The Singles
"Say You Don't Know Me"	1991	—	—	37	Monsters Under the Bed
"The Road"	1992	—	—	60	Monsters Under the Bed
"Tell Me What You Want"	2019	—	—	—	Alive
"Find What You're Looking For"	2020	—	—	—	Alive
"—" denotes a recording that did not chart.
