= Creighton Doane =

Canadian drummer and songwriter

Creighton Doane is a Canadian drummer and songwriter, best known as a longtime member of the rock band Harem Scarem.

The son of music educator J. Chalmers Doane and the brother of singer-songwriter Melanie Doane, his first significant musical project was as the drummer in The October Game, a local Halifax band fronted by Sarah McLachlan. In 1989, he had a role in a theatrical production of Michael Hollingsworth and Deanne Taylor's rock opera adaptation of Rigoletto for Theatre Passe Muraille.

In the early 1990s, he was the drummer in country singer-songwriter Terry Kelly's band. He was also a credited songwriting collaborator on many of Kelly's songs, most notably "In My Father's House", which won the East Coast Music Award for Song of the Year, and was nominated for the Canadian Country Music Award for Song of the Year, in 1993.

In the mid-1990s, he was a frequent collaborator with his sister Melanie, both in songwriting and as the drummer in her touring band. He also independently released a solo album, Gladly the Cross-Eyed Bear, in 1998. He subsequently joined Harem Scarem, appearing for the first time on the band's 2001 album Ultra Feel.

He released his second solo album, Learning More and More About Less and Less, in 2005.

In recent years he has written music for film and television, including songs for The Care Bears' Big Wish Movie and Melanie's children's television series Ukulele U. Along with Bob Ezrin, the Doanes received a Canadian Screen Award nomination for Best Original Song in Television for "Use Your Outside Voice" at the 11th Canadian Screen Awards in 2023.
