= The Gap (song) =

Single by Thompson Twins

from the album Into the Gap
- B-side: Out Of The Gap; Sister Of Mercy
- Released: July 1984 (Europe), 22 November 1984 (USA)
- Recorded: Late 1983
- Genre: Pop rock
- Length: 3:53
- Label: Arista Records
- Songwriter(s): Tom Bailey; Alannah Currie; Joe Leeway
- Producer(s): Alex Sadkin & Tom Bailey

Thompson Twins singles chronology
| "Sister Of Mercy" (1984) | "The Gap" (1984) | "Lay Your Hands On Me" (1984) |

"The Gap" is a song by the British pop group Thompson Twins. It was the title track from the group's 1984 album Into the Gap, and was also released as a single in certain countries though not in the group's native UK. The single peaked at No. 69 in the U.S., spending six weeks on the US Billboard 100. It also charted in Germany where it peaked at No. 62. There was no promotional music video for this single.

The B-sides are a "megamix" of various Thompson Twins songs titled "Out Of The Gap", and the previous single, "Sister Of Mercy" (LP Version).

== Formats ==
7" U.S. vinyl single (Arista AS1-9290)

1. "The Gap" - 3:53
2. "Out Of The Gap" (Medley) - 5:53

12" European vinyl single (Arista 601 365)

1. "The Gap" (Extended Version) - 8:34
2. "Sister Of Mercy" (LP Version) - 5:08 (mislabeled as Extended Version)
3. "Out Of The Gap" (Medley) - 5:53

7" German vinyl single (Ariola 106 591)

1. "The Gap" - 3:53
2. "Sister Of Mercy" - 5:08

12" U.S. vinyl promo single (Arista ADP-9289)

1. "The Gap" (AOR Version) - 3:53
2. "The Gap" (Club Remix Version) - 8:34

7" U.S. vinyl promo single (Arista AS1-9290-SA)

1. "The Gap" - 3:53
2. "The Gap" - 3:53

== Personnel ==
Written by Tom Bailey, Alannah Currie, and Joe Leeway.

- Tom Bailey – vocals, synthesizer, contrabass, guitar, drum programmes
- Alannah Currie – lyrics, marimba, xylophone, backing vocals, percussion
- Joe Leeway – backing vocals, congas, Prophet V
- Pandit Dinesh – tablas
- Produced by Alex Sadkin with Tom Bailey
- Recorded and mixed by Phil Thornalley
- "Out Of The Gap" mixed by The Swedish Eagle & Chris Modig ("In The Name Of Love" produced by Steve Lillywhite)
- Photography – Paul Cox
- Artwork/Design – Andie Airfix, Satori
- Art Direction – Alannah and Nick Marchant

== Chart performance ==
| Chart (1984) | Peak position |
|---|---|
| German Singles Chart | 62 |
| US Billboard Hot 100 | 69 |

== Official versions ==
| Version | Length | Comment |
|---|---|---|
| Album version | 4:43 | Found on the album, Into the Gap, and on some of the various greatest hits compilation CDs. |
| 7" single version/AOR version | 3:53 | Found on the 7" vinyl single (Arista AS1-9290) and the 12" vinyl Promo (Arista ADP-9289). Never has been released on CD. |
| Extended Version/Club Remix | 8:34 | Found on the European 12" vinyl single (Arista 601 365), and the cassette and CD versions of The Best of Thompson Twins: Greatest Mixes. |
| "Compass Points" | 5:00 | A semi-instrumental version of "The Gap", included with the Australian limited edition cassette longplay and 2xLP of Into The Gap with 8 bonus remixes. Also found on the double CD reissue of Into The Gap (2008 Edsel Records). |
| "Out of the Gap" (Medley) [7" Version] | 5:53 | A mix of Thompson Twins songs featuring "In The Name Of Love", "Love On Your Side", "Tears", "Doctor! Doctor!", "We Are Detective", "Lies", "Hold Me Now", and "The Gap". Found on b-side of the UK 7" & 12" vinyl singles for "The Gap", and the 7" vinyl singles for "Sister Of Mercy" (Arista TWINS 5). Never has been released on CD. |
| "Out of the Gap" (Megamix Extended Version) | 8:58 | An extended mix of Thompson Twins songs featuring "In The Name Of Love", "Love On Your Side", "Tears", "Doctor! Doctor!", "We Are Detective", "Lies", "Hold Me Now", and "The Gap". found on b-side of the UK 12" vinyl singles for "Sister Of Mercy" (Arista TWINS 125) and on the double CD reissue of Into The Gap (2008 Edsel Records). |
