= Roll Over (Thompson Twins song) =

- The withdrawn 7" vinyl & 12" vinyl sleeve

Single by Thompson Twins

from the album Here's to Future Days
- B-side: "Fools In Paradise"
- Released: 12 April 1985
- Recorded: 1984−1985
- Genre: Pop rock
- Length: 4:55
- Label: Arista Records
- Songwriters: Tom Bailey; Alannah Currie; Joe Leeway
- Producers: Tom Bailey, John 'Tokes' Potoker, Alannah Currie, Joe Leeway (original version); Nile Rodgers, Tom Bailey (album version)

Thompson Twins singles chronology
"Lay Your Hands On Me" (1984)	"Roll Over" (1985)	"Don't Mess with Doctor Dream" (1985)

Roll Over is a 1985 song by the Thompson Twins. It was intended for release as a single from the band's album Here's To Future Days, but was recalled and withdrawn from shelves the same day of release with the remaining copies destroyed. Some copies made it onto the market before being recalled. After a bout with nervous exhaustion which left him with no reflexes, lead vocalist Tom Bailey took it as a bad omen and decided against the release of the song. Subsequently, it was only released on the North American versions of the album. The versions found on the single are different mixes than the final album version which was co-produced by Nile Rodgers.

The B-side, a semi-instrumental version of "King For A Day" titled "Fools In Paradise", was exclusive to this single.

== Formats ==
7" UK vinyl single (Arista TWINS 8)

1. "Roll Over" - 4:55
2. "Fools In Paradise" - 4:45

12" UK vinyl single (Arista TWINS 128)

1. "Roll Over (Again)" - 6:50
2. "Fools In Paradise" - 5:25

=== 2025 CD Single ===
1. "Roll Over (2025 Remaster)" - 5:00
2. "Rollunder (7" version)" - 4:40
3. "Roll Over (Again)" - 6:54
4. "Rollunder (12" version)" - 6:46

== Official versions ==
Version	Length	Comment
7" version	4:55	Found on the 7" vinyl single (Arista TWINS 8) and on the CD compilation Thompson Twins - The Greatest Hits (2003 Camden/BMG).
"Rollunder" (7" Version)	4:40	Instrumental version of "Roll Over", only found on the 7" vinyl single for "King for a Day" as the B-side (Arista TWINS 7). Only found on CD as part of the compilation Remixes & Rarities.
"Roll Over (Again)" 12" version	6:50	Found on the UK 12" vinyl single (Arista TWINS 128), and on the double CD reissue of Here's to Future Days (2008 Edsel Records).
"Rollunder" (Extended)	6:50	An extended instrumental version of "Roll Over", found on b-side of the UK 12" vinyl singles for "King for a Day" (Arista TWINS 127/227), and on the double CD reissue of Here's To Future Days (2008 Edsel Records).
Album version	4:58	Found on the original 1985 North American versions of Here's to Future Days, and on the double CD reissue of Here's to Future Days (2008 Edsel Records).

== Personnel ==
Written by Tom Bailey, Alannah Currie, and Joe Leeway.

- Tom Bailey – vocals, piano, Fairlight, synthesizers, guitar, contrabass, Fairlight and drum programming
- Alannah Currie – lyrics, marimba, backing vocals, acoustic drums, percussion, tuned percussion
- Joe Leeway – backing vocals, congas, percussion
- Steve Stevens – additional guitars
- Produced by Tom Bailey assisted by Joe Leeway and Alannah Currie
- Co-produced, recorded and mixed by John ' Tokes' Potoker
- Photography – Paul Cox
- Artwork/Design – Andie Airfix, Satori
- Art Direction – Alannah

Album version:

- Produced by Nile Rodgers & Tom Bailey
- Mixed by James Farber
- Mixed at Skyline Studio, NYC
