= Sister of Mercy (song) =

"Sister Of Mercy"

Single by Thompson Twins

from the album Into the Gap
- B-side: "Out Of The Gap"
- Released: 29 June 1984
- Recorded: 31 December 1983
- Genre: Pop rock
- Length: 4:55
- Label: Arista Records
- Songwriters: Tom Bailey; Alannah Currie; Joe Leeway
- Producers: Alex Sadkin & Tom Bailey

Thompson Twins singles chronology
"You Take Me Up" (1984)	"Sister Of Mercy" (1984)	"The Gap" (1984)

"Sister Of Mercy" is a song by the British pop group Thompson Twins. It was originally included on the group's 1984 album Into the Gap, though a remixed version was released as the fourth single from the album in the summer of 1984. The single peaked at #11 in the UK, spending ten weeks on the UK singles chart.

The promotional music video for this single was directed by Dieter Trattmann and featured actress Frances Tomelty.

The B-side of the single was a megamix of various Thompson Twins songs titled "Out Of The Gap".

== Background ==
The theme of the song is domestic abuse. It was inspired by a news article about a person in France having murdered someone, but the court considered the act as a "crime of passion," and that it therefore couldn't be tried on the same basis of a regular homicidal murder.

== Formats ==
7" UK vinyl single (Arista TWINS 5)

1. "Sister Of Mercy" - 4:55
2. "Out Of The Gap" - 5:53

12" UK vinyl single (Arista TWINS 125)

1. "Sister Of Mercy" (Extended Version) - 9:26
2. "Out Of The Gap" (Extended Version) - 8:57

5" UK shaped picture disc (Arista TWISD 5) [Shaped like a spaceship]

1. "Sister Of Mercy" - 4:55
2. "Out Of The Gap" - 5:48

7" Japanese vinyl single (Nippon Phonogram 7RS-103)

1. "Sister Of Mercy" (LP Version) - 5:07
2. "You Take Me Up" - 5:53

12" Japanese vinyl single (Nippon Phonogram 15RS-28)

1. "Sister Of Mercy" (Extended Version) - 9:26
2. "Funeral Dance" - 3:15
3. "You Take Me Up" (Extended Version) - 7:33
4. "Leopard Ray" - 3:50

== Chart performance ==
Chart (1984)	Peak position
UK Singles Chart	11

== Official versions ==
Version	Length	Comment
Album Version	5:04	Found on the album Into The Gap, and on most of the various greatest hits compilation CDs.
7" UK Single Version	4:55	Features a different intro with vocals, piano, and flute and was used in the music video. It also fades out while the group is singing, while the album version has an instrumental fade out. Only found on the UK 7" vinyl single (Arista TWINS 5) and the CD compilation, The Best Of Thompson Twins - Platinum & Gold Collection (2003 Arista/BMG Heritage).
Extended Version/12" Version	9:26	Found on the UK 12" vinyl single (Arista TWINS 125) and the double CD reissue of Into The Gap (2008 Edsel Records).
Premix Version	5:22	A unique version of the song with more of a dub sound to it, found exclusively on the compilation, Thompson Twins - The Greatest Hits (2003 Camden/BMG). Mislabeled as the 7" version

== Personnel ==
Written by Tom Bailey, Alannah Currie, and Joe Leeway.

- Tom Bailey - vocals, synthesizer, bass, guitar, drum programming
- Alannah Currie - marimba, xylophone, backing vocals, percussion
- Joe Leeway - backing vocals, congas, synthesizer
- Produced by Alex Sadkin with Tom Bailey
- Recorded and mixed by Phil Thornalley
- "Out Of The Gap" mixed by The Swedish Eagle & Chris Modig in Los Angeles
- Photography - Paul Cox
- Artwork/Design - Satori (Andie Airfix)
- Art Direction - Alannah
