= Don't Mess with Doctor Dream =

"Don't Mess With Doctor Dream"

Single by Thompson Twins

from the album Here's to Future Days
- B-side: "Big Business"
- Released: 23 August 1985
- Recorded: 1984–1985
- Genre: Pop rock
- Length: 4:24
- Label: Arista
- Songwriters: Tom Bailey; Alannah Currie; Joe Leeway
- Producers: Nile Rodgers; Tom Bailey

Thompson Twins singles chronology
"Lay Your Hands on Me" (1985)	"Don't Mess With Doctor Dream" (1985)	"King for a Day" (1985)

Second 12" vinyl single sleeve

"Don't Mess with Doctor Dream" is a 1985 song by the English pop band Thompson Twins. It was released as a single from their fifth studio album Here's to Future Days (1985), and peaked at No. 15 on the UK singles chart, spending six weeks on there. Written by bandmembers Tom Bailey, Alannah Currie and Joe Leeway, it is an anti-drug song warning of the dangers of drug addiction. It was the first Thompson Twins single to be co-produced by Nile Rodgers. A promotional music video was made for the single which was directed by Godley & Creme along with Meiert Avis.

The B-side, "Big Business", was exclusive to this single with two versions: 7" version and an extended version called "Very Big Business".

== Critical reception ==
On its release, Paul Sexton of Record Mirror considered "Don't Mess with Doctor Dream" to have "commendable anti-heroin sentiments", but felt the song was "rather a plodder compared to the pop craft of the singles from Into the Gap".

== Formats ==
7" UK vinyl single (1985) Arista TWINS 9

1. "Don't Mess With Doctor Dream" – 3:36
2. "Big Business" – 4:13

12" UK vinyl single (1985) Arista TWINS 129

1. "Don't Mess With Doctor Dream" (Smackattack!) – 6:10
2. "Very Big Business" – 5:06

12" UK vinyl single (1985) Arista TWINS 229

1. "Don't Mess With Doctor Dream" ((U4A) + (U3A) = Remix) – 6:38
2. "Very Big Business" – 5:06

== Personnel ==
Written by Tom Bailey, Alannah Currie, and Joe Leeway.

- Tom Bailey – vocals, piano, Fairlight CMI, synthesizers, guitar, contrabass, Fairlight CMI and drum machine programming
- Alannah Currie – lyrics, marimba, backing vocals, acoustic drums, percussion, tuned percussion
- Joe Leeway – backing vocals, congas, Z-bass, E-mu Emulator, percussion
- Produced by Nile Rodgers and Tom Bailey
- Mixed by James Farber
- Mixed at Skyline Studio, New York City
- Photography – Rebecca Blake
- Artwork/Design – Andie Airfix, Satori
- Art Direction – Alannah

== Chart performance ==
Chart (1985)	Peak position
UK singles chart	15
Australian Singles Chart	17
German Singles Chart	30
Italy (Musica e dischi)	13
New Zealand Singles Chart	12
Swedish Singles Chart	10
Swedish Trackslistan	5

=== Official versions ===
Version	Length	Mixed/Remixed by	Comment
Album version	4:24	Nile Rodgers and Tom Bailey	Found on the album Here's to Future Days, and the majority of their greatest hits compilations.
"Shoot Out"	6:23	Nile Rodgers and Tom Bailey	An extended version of the song featured on the bonus 5 song remix EP included with the limited edition of Here's to Future Days. Found on Edsel's 2008 CD reissue of Here's to Future Days. This remix is the same as the ((U4A) + (U3A) = Remix).
7" single version	3:36	Tom Bailey and James Farber	Found on the album Here's to Future Days, and on the following CD compilations: Thompson Twins – 'The Collection' (1993 BMG), Thompson Twins- 'Singles Collection' (1996 Camden/BMG), Thompson Twins – 'The Greatest Hits' (2003 Camden/BMG). Begins with the sound of an orchestra tuning up and ends with Alannah's scream.
"Big Business"	4:14	Tom Bailey	Instrumental version of "Don't Mess with Doctor Dream", found exclusively on the B-side of the 7" vinyl single. Never released on CD.
12" SMACKATTACK! Version	6:10	Nile Rodgers and Tom Bailey	Found on the UK 12" vinyl single (Arista TWINS 129) and on the 2xCD reissue of Here's to Future Days (2008 Edsel).
"Very Big Business"	5:06	Tom Bailey	An extended instrumental version of "Don't Mess with Doctor Dream", found on the UK 12" vinyl single (Arista TWINS 129 and Arista TWINS 229), on the 2xCD reissue of Here's to Future Days (2008 Edsel) and on the CD, Thompson Twins – 'The Platinum & Gold Collection' (2003 BMG Heritage/Arista).
12" ((U4A) + (U3A) = Remix)	6:38	Tom Bailey	Found on the UK 12" vinyl single (Arista TWINS 229) and on the 2xCD reissue of Here's to Future Days (2008 Edsel) as "Shoot Out".
