= Love Has No Name =

Single by Babble

from the album Ether
- Released: 1996
- Length: 5:35 (album version); 3:39 (remix edit)
- Label: Reprise; Eternal
- Songwriters: Alannah Currie; Tom Bailey
- Producers: Tom Bailey; Alannah Currie; Keith Fernley

Babble singles chronology
"Beautiful" (1994)	"Love Has No Name" (1996)

"Love Has No Name" is a song from British-New Zealand electronic dance music group Babble, which was released in 1996 as the sole single from their second and final studio album, Ether (1996). The song was written by Alannah Currie (lyrics) and Tom Bailey (music), and was produced by Bailey, Currie and Keith Fernley. It reached number 10 on the US Billboard Hot Dance Music Club Play chart.

The song features Teremoana Rapley as guest vocalist. It is the only track on Ether not to feature Bailey or Currie on lead vocals.

== Critical reception ==
On its release, Larry Flick of Billboard magazine described Babble as an act which "deftly blends electro-pop gloss with gritty dance and world beat rhythms" and praised Rapley as an "enigmatic vocal presence" which "bring[s] the melodramatic pose of a French chanteuse to the song". Flick also praised Todd Terry's house remix and drew comparisons to Terry's remix work on "Missing" by Everything but the Girl. In a review of Ether, Daina Darzin of Cash Box praised the song as "particularly memorable" and noted its "undulating dance beat" and "sensual, Sade-style vocals". Chuck Campbell of the Knoxville News–Sentinel noted it had a "livelier rhythm" than the rest of Ether, but added that the song was "in need of development".

== Track listing ==
12-inch single (UK and Germany)
No.	Title	Notes	Length
1.	"Love Has No Name"	Tee's Freeze	6:32
2.	"Love Has No Name"	Archaeopteryx Dub	7:02
3.	"Love Has No Name"	Vita Brevis Mix	9:09
4.	"Love Has No Name"	Ars Longa Mix	5:34

12-inch promotional single (UK)
No.	Title	Notes	Length
1.	"Love Has No Name"	Tee's Freeze	6:32
2.	"Love Has No Name"	Tee's Club	6:35
3.	"Love Has No Name"	Vita Brevis Mix	9:09
4.	"Love Has No Name"	Ars Longa Mix	5:34

12-inch promotional single (US)
No.	Title	Notes	Length
1.	"Love Has No Name"	Tee's Freeze	6:32
2.	"Love Has No Name"	Tee's Club	6:34
3.	"Love Has No Name"	Bonus Beats	3:10
4.	"Love Has No Name"	Jasminder	5:29
5.	"Love Has No Name"	Vita Brevis Mix	9:09

2x 12-inch promotional single (US)
No.	Title	Notes	Length
1.	"Love Has No Name"	Tee's Freeze	6:32
2.	"Love Has No Name"	Tee's Club	6:35
3.	"Love Has No Name"	Vita Brevis Mix	9:09
4.	"Love Has No Name"	Ars Longa Mix	5:34
5.	"Love Has No Name"	Jasminder	5:28
6.	"Love Has No Name"	Archaeopteryx Dub	7:04
7.	"Love Has No Name"	Remix Edit	3:39
8.	"Love Has No Name"	Instrumental	6:35
9.	"Love Has No Name"	Bonus Beats	3:10

CD single (US)
No.	Title	Notes	Length
1.	"Love Has No Name"	Album Edit	3:40
2.	"Love Has No Name"	Remix Edit	3:39
3.	"Love Has No Name"	Tee's Freeze	6:35
4.	"Love Has No Name"	Jasminder	5:26
5.	"Love Has No Name"	Vita Brevis Mix	9:07
6.	"Love Has No Name"	Tee's Club	6:33
7.	"Love Has No Name"	Archaeopteryx Dub	7:01
8.	"Love Has No Name"	Ars Longa Mix	5:26

CD single (Germany)
No.	Title	Notes	Length
1.	"Love Has No Name"	Remix Edit	3:39
2.	"Love Has No Name"	Tee's Freeze	6:32
3.	"Love Has No Name"	Vita Brevis Mix	9:09
4.	"Love Has No Name"	Ars Longa Mix	5:34
5.	"Love Has No Name"	Jasminder	5:25
6.	"Love Has No Name"	Archaeopteryx Dub	7:02

CD promotional single (Europe)
No.	Title	Notes	Length
1.	"Love Has No Name"	Tee's Freeze - Eternal Radio Edit	3:15

== Personnel ==
Credits are adapted from the US double 12-inch vinyl single and the Ether CD booklet.

- Babble – music
- Teremoana Rapley – vocals

Production

- Tom Bailey – producer, programming, recording, mixing
- Alannah Currie – producer, recording, mixing
- Keith Fernley – producer, engineer, programming, recording, mixing

Remixes

- Tom Bailey – all remixes except "Remix Edit", "Tee's Freeze" and "Tee's Club"
- Simon Rycroft – assistant remixer on all remixes except "Remix Edit", "Tee's Freeze" and "Tee's Club"
- Todd Terry – remixer and additional production on "Remix Edit", "Tee's Freeze" and "Tee's Club"
- Matthias Heibron – engineer on "Remix Edit", "Tee's Freeze" and "Tee's Club"

Other

- V8 with Babble – sleeve design
- Melanie Bridge – photography

== Charts ==
Chart (1996)	Peak position
UK Club Chart (Music Week)	26
UK Pop Tip Club Chart (Music Week)	35
US Hot Dance Music Club Play (Billboard)	10
