= Bailey-Salgado Project =

- Origin: Chicago, United States; London, UK
- Genres: Ambient, electronica
- Years active: 2010–present
- Members: Tom Bailey; José Francisco Salgado
- Website: BaileySalgadoProject.com

The Bailey-Salgado Project (often abbreviated to BSP) is an audiovisual ensemble formed in 2010 by musician and composer Tom Bailey (Thompson Twins/Babble, International Observer) and astronomer and visual artist José Francisco Salgado. They combine music with photography, video, and motion graphics to create multimedia works that have as a subject the physical world. Their first work together, a short film entitled Sidereal Motion, was previewed in Bath, England in October 2010.

== History ==
=== Formation ===
In early 2010, José Francisco Salgado, an astronomer and science visualizer at the Adler Planetarium in Chicago, edited nighttime footage he had taken at the Paranal Observatory to the track Spirit by Babble, an electronic band led by Tom Bailey after the Thompson Twins disbanded. Salgado called the piece "Under Paranal Skies" and presented it at the 215th Meeting of the American Astronomical Society in Washington, DC. The reception given to "Under Paranal Skies" prompted Salgado to contact Bailey to share the piece and get official permission to use the music. Bailey was pleased to learn how well his music suited Salgado's project and suggested composing new music for a future project.

Their first project together was Sidereal Motion, a four-movement film about the night sky photographed from five astronomical observatories worldwide. "Under Paranal Skies" is the fourth movement of the film but with new music inspired by the visuals.

=== First Presentations ===
On 27 October 2010 the Bailey-Salgado Project previewed Sidereal Motion at the 7th international conference on the Inspiration of Astronomical Phenomena (INSAP) at the Bath Royal Literary & Scientific Institution in Bath, England with Bailey improvising on keyboard.

=== List of works ===
| Year | Title | Duration |
|---|---|---|
| 2010 | Sidereal Motion | 15:06 |
| 2011 | Staring at the Sun | 10:36 |
| 2011 | Clouds | 3:36 |
| 2011 | The Great Nebula in Carina | 5:33 |
| 2011 | Sketches for Moonrise | 5:41 |
| 2011 | 2011 Show Intro | 1:41 |
| 2012 | Moonrise | 23:04 |
| 2012 | A Brief History of Space | 4:21 |
| 2012 | The World in Infrared | 3:36 |
| 2012 | 2012 Show Intro | 1:17 |

== KV 265 ==
The Bailey-Salgado Project is involved with KV 265, a non-profit organization founded by Salgado and whose mission is the communication of science through art. Through its works BSP seeks to create multimedia experiences that provoke curiosity and a sense of wonder about the physical world while promoting better education in science and the arts. BSP presentations are supported and coordinated by KV 265.
