= Lay Your Hands on Me (Thompson Twins song) =

Single by Thompson Twins

from the album Here's to Future Days
- B-side: "The Lewis Carol (Adventures in Wonderland)"
- Released: 26 November 1984 (UK/Australia); 26 July 1985 (US/Canada)
- Recorded: 1 January 1984 – 23 June 1985
- Genre: New wave; pop rock
- Length: 4:22 (album version); 3:52 (single version)
- Label: Arista
- Songwriters: Alannah Currie; Tom Bailey; Joe Leeway
- Producers: Alex Sadkin and Tom Bailey (1984); Alex Sadkin, Nile Rodgers, and Tom Bailey (1985)

Thompson Twins singles chronology
"The Gap" (1984)	"Lay Your Hands on Me" (1984)	"'Roll Over'" (1985)

US cover

"Lay Your Hands on Me" is a song by the English pop band Thompson Twins, written by Tom Bailey, Alannah Currie, and Joe Leeway. Released as a single in the UK in 1984, a different version of the song appeared on their fifth studio album Here's to Future Days (1985).

There are two main versions of the song, with various edits and remixes of the two. The first version, produced by Alex Sadkin and Tom Bailey, was released in November 1984 in Europe and Australia. The 1985 version was a reworking co-produced by Nile Rodgers, adding electric guitar and a gospel choir and released as a single in the US; this version appeared on the album.

The single peaked at No. 13 on the UK singles chart, spending nine weeks there. In the US, it peaked at No. 14 on both the Adult Contemporary and Rock Tracks charts, No. 46 on the Dance Club Play chart, and No. 6 on the Hot 100 singles chart.

The B-side, "The Lewis Carol (Adventures in Wonderland)", is an instrumental variation of the song and was exclusive to this single.

== Content ==
Singer Tom Bailey said,

We were interested in the idea of group rituals of that sort, and particularly how it relates to artist, performer, and audience. ... [The song is] nonspecifically religious. It looks at religious ritual in that way, and then draws a kind of metaphor - I've always been very fond of the kind of layered metaphor where the song can be about one thing but also about another. That's part of a really ancient and noble tradition of religious writing of music. Typically, people talk about their love for God in a religious song, but what they're also saying is that they love someone human. It's a way of evoking that immense emotional weight into a song.

== Music video ==
Two versions of the promotional music video directed by Dee Trattmann exist for the single. The original edit of the music video features the band performing the 1984 version of the song on a stage in front of an audience of pop star look-alikes including David Bowie, Siouxsie Sioux, Mari Wilson, Prince, Rod Stewart, Adam Ant, Boy George and Grace Jones. When the song was reworked in 1985, the video was re-edited with the 1985 version dubbed instead.

== Formats ==
7" UK vinyl single (1984) Arista TWINS 6

1. "Lay Your Hands on Me" – 4:11
2. "The Lewis Carol (Adventures in Wonderland)" – 4:10

12" UK vinyl single (1984) Arista TWINS 126

1. "Lay Your Hands on Me" (Extended Mix/Full Version) – 6:08
2. "The Lewis Carol (Adventures in Wonderland)" – 4:10

7" UK vinyl single (1984) Arista TWING 6

1. "Lay Your Hands on Me" (U.S. Re-mix) – 4:19
2. "The Lewis Carol (Adventures in Wonderland)" – 4:10

12" UK vinyl single (1984) Arista TWINS 226

1. "Lay Your Hands on Me" (U.S. Re-mix) – 5:51
2. "The Lewis Carol (Adventures in Wonderland)" – 4:10

7" UK vinyl Picture Disc (1984) Arista TWISD 6

1. "Lay Your Hands on Me" (Single Version) – 3:44
2. "The Lewis Carol (Adventures in Wonderland)" – 4:12

New Zealand cassette single (1984) Festival Records-C 14155

1. "Lay Your Hands on Me" (Extended Version) – 6:05
2. "Lay Your Hands on Me" (U.S. Remix) – 5:56
3. "The Lewis Carol (Adventures in Wonderland)" – 4:13

7" U.S. vinyl single (1985) Arista AS1-9396

1. "Lay Your Hands on Me" (Single Version) – 3:44
2. "The Lewis Carol (Adventures in Wonderland)" – 4:12

12" U.S. vinyl single (1985) Arista AD1-9397

1. "Lay Your Hands on Me" (Single Version) – 3:52
2. "The Lewis Carol (Adventures in Wonderland)" – 4:14
3. "Lay Your Hands on Me" (Extended Version) – 6:00

7" vinyl (1985 promo) Arista AS1-9396

1. "Lay Your Hands on Me" (Cold Ending) – 3:44
2. "Lay Your Hands on Me" (Fade) – 3:44

== Personnel ==
Written by Alannah Currie, Tom Bailey, and Joe Leeway.

- Tom Bailey – vocals, piano, Fairlight, synthesizers, guitar, contrabass, Fairlight and drum programming
- Alannah Currie – lyrics, marimba, backing vocals, acoustic drums, percussion, tuned percussion
- Joe Leeway – backing vocals, congas, percussion

1984 Versions

- Produced by Alex Sadkin and Tom Bailey
- Remixed by Alex Sadkin, Tom Bailey, and John 'Tokes' Potoker (U.S. Re-mix)
- Sleeve Designs – Satori
- Art Direction – Alannah Currie and Nick Marchant
- Photography – Moshe Brakha

1985 Versions

- Produced by Alex Sadkin, Nile Rodgers, and Tom Bailey
- Engineered by James Farber and Terry Becker
- Mixed by James Farber
- Backing Vocals – East Harlem Hobo Choir
- Mixed at Skyline Studio, NYC
- Photography – Rebecca Blake
- Artwork/Design – Andie Airfix, Satori
- Art Direction – Alannah

== Chart performance ==
Chart (1984–1985)	Peak position
Australian Singles Chart	28
Canadian Singles Chart	8
German Singles Chart	39
New Zealand Singles Chart	19
Swedish Singles Chart	17
UK Official Singles Chart	13
US Billboard Hot 100	6
US Billboard Adult Contemporary	14
US Billboard Hot Dance/Club Play	46
US Billboard Top Rock Tracks	14

Year-end chart (1985)	Rank
US Top Pop Singles (Billboard)	84

== Official versions ==
Version	Length	Year released	Produced by	Mixed/Remixed by	Comment
1984 7" version	4:11	1984	Alex Sadkin & Tom Bailey	Alex Sadkin & Tom Bailey	Version from the UK 7" vinyl single—this is the charted UK hit version. Appeared on the film soundtrack for Perfect (1985); also found on the CD 'Thompson Twins – Platinum & Gold Collection' (2003 BMG Heritage/Arista).
"The Lewis Carol (Adventures In Wonderland)"	4:13	1984; 1985	Alex Sadkin & Tom Bailey	Alex Sadkin & Tom Bailey	This is an eclectic instrumental version of the song featured as the 7" and 12" B-side to both 1984 and 1985 versions. Found on Edsel's 2008 reissue of Here's To Future Days.
1984 Extended Remix/Full Version	6:08	1984	Alex Sadkin & Tom Bailey	Alex Sadkin & Tom Bailey	Found on the UK 12" vinyl and the following CD compilations: The Greatest Hits (2003 Camden/BMG), Here's To Future Days (Edsel reissue 2008),
1984 7" U.S. Re-mix	4:19	1984	Alex Sadkin & Tom Bailey	John 'Tokes' Potoker	Despite being explicitly billed as the "U.S. Re-mix", never actually issued in the U.S. Only found on the U.K. 7" vinyl single. Never released on any CD compilation.
1984 12" U.S. Re-mix	5:51	1984	Alex Sadkin & Tom Bailey	John 'Tokes' Potoker	Despite being explicitly billed as the "U.S. Re-mix", never actually issued in the U.S. Only found on the U.K./Australian 12" vinyl singles and the New Zealand cassette maxi-single. Appeared on CD for the first time on the 2014 Cherry Pop compilation Remixes & Rarities.
1984 Extended U.S. Re-mix	6:23	1984	Alex Sadkin & Tom Bailey	John 'Tokes' Potoker	First appeared on the CD compilation Thompson Twins 'Singles Collection' (1996 Camden/BMG); also found on 'The Best Of Thompson Twins' (1998 BMG/Arista Japan), and the reissue of Here's To Future Days (2008 Edsel).
"Lay Your Hands on Me" (Fade)	3:44	1985	Alex Sadkin, Nile Rodgers, & Tom Bailey	James Farber	Fades out before the instrumental ending. Found only on the 7" promo b/w with "Lay Your Hands on Me" (Cold Ending).
7" Single Version	3:44	1985	Alex Sadkin, Nile Rodgers, & Tom Bailey	James Farber	Only available on 7" vinyl. This is the charted US and Canadian hit version. Not available on any CD compilation. This version has a shorter intro and the cold ending.
Extended Version	6:00	1985	Alex Sadkin, Nile Rodgers, & Tom Bailey	Nile Rodgers & Tom Bailey	Found on the U.S. 12" vinyl single and the 2008 Edsel CD reissue of Here's To Future Days.
Album Version	4:21	1985	Alex Sadkin, Nile Rodgers, & Tom Bailey	James Farber	From the album Here's To Future Days. This version is usually the version included on the myriad of Thompson Twins greatest hits compilations.
"Alice" (Instrumental)	4:59	1985	Alex Sadkin, Nile Rodgers, & Tom Bailey	James Farber	Instrumental version with a longer intro. From the bonus 5 track remix EP included with the limited edition of Here's To Future Days. Appeared on CD for the first time on Edsel's 2008 reissue of Here's To Future Days.
Extended Remix Edit	5:12	1988	Alex Sadkin, Nile Rodgers & Tom Bailey	Nile Rodgers & Tom Bailey, James Farber	Exclusive edited remix from The Best of Thompson Twins: Greatest Mixes.
Album Edit	4:06	1996	Alex Sadkin, Nile Rodgers, & Tom Bailey	James Farber	Album version with a shortened intro. Found on the CD compilations: Greatest Hits (1996 Arista/BMG), 'Thompson Twins – Hold Me Now' (2000 Arista/BMG), and 'Thompson Twins – UK BMG Music Publishing Promo CD' (2003).
