= Take Me Away (Babble song) =

Single by Babble

from the album The Stone
- Released: 1994
- Length: 6:41 (album version); 4:03 (single mix)
- Label: Reprise, Eternal
- Songwriters: Alannah Currie; Tom Bailey
- Producers: Alannah Currie; Tom Bailey

Babble singles chronology
"Tribe" (1993)	"Take Me Away" (1994)	"Beautiful" / "Tribe" (1994)

"Take Me Away" is a song from British-New Zealand electronic dance music group Babble, which was released in 1994 as the lead single from their debut studio album The Stone. The song was written and produced by Alannah Currie and Tom Bailey. It reached number 18 on the US Billboard Hot Dance Music Club Play chart.

== Background ==
"Take Me Away" originated with Currie, who had the idea for the song when she and Bailey were part of the audience at Glastonbury Festival. Bailey told Hits in 1994, "Alannah actually wrote the song at Glastonbury. We were there in a massive crowd of people and she wrote it gazing over a hill looking at the crowd." Currie and Bailey then rewrote the song two or three times, with Bailey revealing, "It started out fairly plain and we decided that it was too monolithic, so we broke it down into all these Middle Eastern bits."

== Release ==
For its release as a single, three remixes of "Take Me Away" were created by Tony Garcia and Peter Daou. Bailey and assistant producer/engineer Keith Fernley also created one remix. Bailey told Billboard in 1994, "As a marketing tool, I don't mind remixes of our songs, but it's really important that we get to do one, too. Otherwise, the single becomes a complete reflection of everyone but the band."

== Critical reception ==
On its release, Larry Flick of Billboard listed the single under "new & noteworthy" and described Babble as a band that "playfully indulges in dreamy, ambient dance culture and synth-sweetened pop melodicism". He considered "Take Me Away" to an "overall tone that is highly complex", but added it was "completely accessible to mainstream club and radio formats". He concluded that the song was "utterly cool" and "the perfect vehicle to take Bailey and Currie to an interesting and successful new phase of their careers". Dave Sholin of the Gavin Report noted that although Currie and Bailey had changed their name to Babble, on "Take Me Away" "the sound is intact and very ready for the '90s".

== Track listing ==
12-inch single (US)
No.	Title	Notes	Length
1.	"Take Me Away"	Bel Mix	8:00
2.	"Take Me Away"	Bel Dub	6:52
3.	"Take Me Away"	Take Me Dub	5:16
4.	"Take Me Away"	Lounge Lizard Mix	6:48
5.	"Take Me Away"	Flying High Mix	8:22
6.	"Sunray Dub"	Album Version	2:25
7.	"Take Me Away"	Toga Dub	4:49

CD maxi-single (US)
No.	Title	Notes	Length
1.	"Take Me Away"	Single Mix	4:03
2.	"Take Me Away"	Bel Mix	8:00
3.	"Take Me Away"	Lounge Lizard Mix	6:48
4.	"Sunray Dub"	Album Version	2:25
5.	"Take Me Away"	Flying High Mix	8:22
6.	"Take Me Away"	Toga Dub	4:49
7.	"Take Me Away"	Flying High Edit	4:02
8.	"Take Me Away"	Album Edit	4:07

CD promotional single (US)
No.	Title	Notes	Length
1.	"Take Me Away"	Single Mix	4:03
2.	"Take Me Away"	Album Edit	4:07
3.	"Take Me Away"	Flying High Edit	4:02

12-inch promotional single (UK)
No.	Title	Notes	Length
1.	"Take Me Away"	Bel Mix	8:00
2.	"Take Me Away"	Bel Dub	6:52
3.	"Take Me Away"	Toga Dub	4:49

== Personnel ==
Credits are adapted from the US CD maxi-single and The Stone CD booklet.

- Babble – vocals, music
- Amey St. Cyr – vocals

Production

- Tom Bailey – producer, programming, mixing
- Alannah Currie – producer
- Keith Fernley – assistant producer, engineer, programming, mixing

Remixes

- Tom Bailey – additional production and remix on "Bel Mix"
- Keith Fernley – additional production and remix on "Bel Mix"
- Tony Garcia – additional production and remix on "Lounge Lizard Mix", "Flying High Mix" and "Toga Dub"
- Peter Daou – remix on "Lounge Lizard Mix", "Flying High Mix" and "Toga Dub"

Other

- Katherine Delaney – design
- Ira Cohen – photography ("Face" image)

== Charts ==
Chart (1994)	Peak position
US Hot Dance Music Club Play (Billboard)	18
