= You Take Me Up =

1984 single by Thompson Twins

Single by Thompson Twins

from the album Into the Gap
- B-side: "Passion Planet"; "Down Tools"; "Leopard Ray"
- Released: 19 March 1984
- Length: 3:55
- Label: Arista
- Songwriters: Tom Bailey, Alannah Currie, Joe Leeway
- Producers: Alex Sadkin, Tom Bailey

Thompson Twins singles chronology
"Doctor! Doctor!" (1984)	"You Take Me Up" (1984)	"Sister of Mercy" (1984)

Official video
- " You Take Me Up" on YouTube

"You Take Me Up" is a song by British pop group Thompson Twins, released as the third single from their fourth studio album, Into the Gap (1984), on 19 March 1984. It was written by Tom Bailey, Alannah Currie and Joe Leeway and prominently features the harmonica and a melodica solo. In addition to the regular 7-inch and multiple 12-inch releases, Arista Records also released four different shaped picture discs for the single, one of which was a mostly circular globe style disc, and three of which formed an interconnecting oval-shaped jigsaw.

The single peaked at number two in the United Kingdom, making it their highest-charting song, and spent 11 weeks on the chart. It was the UK's 57th-highest-selling single of 1984 and was certified silver by the British Phonographic Industry (BPI) the same year. In the United States, the single spent nine weeks on the Billboard Hot 100, peaking at number 44 in October 1984. The promotional music video for this single was directed by Dieter Trattmann.

== "Passion Planet" ==
The B-side of the single is a non-album track entitled "Passion Planet". This song became especially popular in Los Angeles, receiving "heavy" rotation on several radio stations (e.g., KROQ-FM) which preferred it instead of "You Take Me Up". It became one of the top songs of 1984 in Los Angeles.

== Track listings ==
7-inch single

A. "You Take Me Up" – 3:55
B. "Passion Planet" – 3:42

UK 12-inch single

A1. "You Take Me Up" (Machines Take Me Over) – 7:33
A2. "Down Tools" – 4:18
B1. "Leopard Ray" – 3:50
B2. "Passion Planet" – 3:05

UK limited-edition 12-inch single

A1. "You Take Me Up" (High Plains Mixer) – 8:30
B1. "You Take Me Up" (instrumental) – 6:20
B2. "Passion Planet" – 3:44

Australian cassette single

A1. "You Take Me Up / Machines Take Me Over" – 8:26
A2. "Down Tools" – 3:25
B1. "You Take Me Up" (U.S. dance mix) – 8:30
B2. "Passion Planet" – 3:44

== Personnel ==
Thompson Twins

- Tom Bailey – writing, vocals, synthesizer, contrabass, harmonica, melodica, drum programming
- Alannah Currie – writing, percussion, marimba, xylophone, backing vocals, lyrics
- Joe Leeway – writing, congas, Prophet V, backing vocals

Other

- Produced by Alex Sadkin with Tom Bailey
- Recorded and mixed by Phil Thornalley
- Photography by Paul Cox
- Artwork/Design by Satori (Andie Airfix)
- Art Direction by Alannah Currie and Nic Marchant

== Charts ==
=== Weekly charts ===
Chart (1984)	Peak position
Australia (Kent Music Report)	47
Canada Top Singles (RPM)	28
Europe (European Hot 100 Singles)	14
Ireland (IRMA)	5
Netherlands (Single Top 100)	50
New Zealand (Recorded Music NZ)	24
UK Singles (Official Charts)	2
US Billboard Hot 100	44
West Germany (GfK)	24

=== Year-end charts ===
Chart (1984)	Position
UK Singles (OCC)	57

== Certifications ==
Region	Certification	Certified units/sales
United Kingdom (BPI)	Silver	250,000^{^}
^{^} Shipments figures based on certification alone.
