= King for a Day (Thompson Twins song) =

Single by Thompson Twins

from the album Here's to Future Days
- B-side: "Rollunder"
- Released: 11 October 1985
- Recorded: 1984–1985
- Genre: Pop rock
- Length: 5:20 (album version); 3:58 (single version)
- Label: Arista Records
- Songwriters: Tom Bailey, Alannah Currie, Joe Leeway
- Producers: Nile Rodgers & Tom Bailey

Thompson Twins singles chronology
"Don't Mess With Doctor Dream" (1985)	"King for a Day" (1985)	"Revolution" (1985)

Audio
- "King for a Day" on YouTube

US 7-inch vinyl sleeve

"King for a Day" is a 1985 song by the British band the Thompson Twins. It was released as the third single from the band's fifth album Here's to Future Days.

It was written by Tom Bailey, Alannah Currie, and Joe Leeway. There are two versions of the song, with various edits and remixes of the two. The UK version of the song has alternate lyrics and is more synth based. The US and album versions contain electric guitar. The single peaked at number 22 in the UK Singles Chart, spending six weeks on the chart and would be the band's final UK Top 40 hit. The single fared better in America where it peaked at number 8 on the US Billboard Hot 100 and also peaked at number 13 on the Billboard Adult Contemporary chart. It was a success on the Swedish Trackslistan, occupying the number one spot for four consecutive weeks in November 1985, during a seven week chart stay.

The B-side, "Rollunder", was exclusive to this single with two versions; a shorter 7-inch version and an extended version. It is a variation of the band's song "Roll Over", which was planned for release as a single earlier in 1985, but withdrawn from sale at the last moment.

== Music video ==
A promotional music video was made for the single that was directed by Meiert Avis. Three edited versions of the video are known to exist. The first version features Bailey, Currie, and Leeway at the "Hard Cash Hotel" with Bailey singing to Currie as he attempts to cheer her up. The ending shows the trio playing their instruments in front of stained glass windows with a backing band dressed as nuns. The second edited version shows more shots of the trio performing with the backing band interspersed with scenes from the trio at the hotel. The third edit omits any scenes from the hotel and solely features the trio performing with the backing band dressed as nuns in front of stained glass windows.

== Formats ==
Japanese Promo 7" vinyl single (7 inch record / 45)

1. "King for a Day" (single 45 edit) - 4:14
2. "Rollunder"

7-inch UK vinyl single

1. "King for a Day" (Special U.K. Mix Re Edit) – 5:57
2. "Rollunder" (12" Version) – 4:46

12-inch UK vinyl single

1. "King for a Day" (extended mix) – 8:02
2. "Rollunder" – 6:50

12-inch UK vinyl single

1. "King for a Day" (US re-mix) – 7:20
2. "Rollunder" – 6:50

7-inch US vinyl single

1. "King for a Day" (single version) – 3:58
2. "Rollunder" – 4:40

12-inch US vinyl single

1. "King for a Day" (rock radio edit) – 4:10
2. "King for a Day" (LP version) – 5:20
3. "Roll Over" (LP version) – 4:58

== Personnel ==
Written by Tom Bailey, Alannah Currie, and Joe Leeway.

- Tom Bailey – vocals, piano, Fairlight, synthesizers, guitar, contrabass, Fairlight and drum programming
- Alannah Currie – marimba, acoustic drums, percussion, tuned percussion, backing vocals, lyrics
- Joe Leeway – congas, percussion, backing vocals
- Nile Rodgers – additional guitar and backing vocals
- Produced by Nile Rodgers and Tom Bailey
- Mixed by James Farber
- Mixed at Skyline Studio, NYC
- Photography – Rebecca Blake
- Artwork/Design – Andie Airfix, Satori
- Art Direction – Alannah

== Chart performance ==
Chart (1985–1986)	Peak position
UK Singles Chart	22
Australian Singles Chart	20
Canadian Singles Chart	12
New Zealand Singles Chart	1
Swedish Singles Chart	10
Swedish Trackslistan	1
US Billboard Hot 100	8
US Adult Contemporary	13

Year-end charts	Rank
Swedish Trackslistan 1985	6
US Top Pop Singles (Billboard) 1986	96
