= Science Fiction (Tom Bailey album) =

Studio album by Tom Bailey
- Released: 13 July 2018
- Recorded: 2014–2018
- Genres: New wave; pop; rock
- Length: 44:10
- Labels: PledgeMusic; Red River Entertainment; Mikrokosmos
- Producer: Tom Bailey

Singles from Science Fiction
- 1. "Come So Far" Released: 2016; 2. "What Kind of World" Released: 28 June 2018

Science Fiction is the debut solo studio album by the English singer Tom Bailey, best known as the lead singer of pop band Thompson Twins. It was released on 13 July 2018. A limited-edition double CD hardback mediabook version of the album was also released, featuring a bonus disc with seven alternative versions and remixes, and a companion book.

In a press release of the album's announcement in May 2018, Bailey commented: "I so much enjoyed playing concerts around the world over the last couple of years, that I began working behind the scenes on writing, recording and mixing the songs in this collection. I find it incredibly rewarding to be making pop music again."

== Background ==
After being seduced back into playing Thompson Twins songs in concert, Bailey became increasingly interested in the challenge of creating new and contemporary songs. Despite not being interested in science fiction, Bailey found the concept of using science to shine "new light on old problems" to be a fascinating topic, and found that the songs he had written all shared this theme. After writing the aptly titled "Science Fiction" he realized that it would make a perfect title for the album itself.

The futuristic subject matter present in "What Kind of World" was inspired by the death of David Bowie and the visions of Elon Musk. Bailey believed Musk's ambitions to colonize Mars were both intriguing yet troubling. He explained, "His plan to send people to Mars to save the Earth...is sort of an exciting thing, an optimistic thing, [but] I really worry that the idea that Elon's going to send some rich people to Mars means we don't have to save the Earth anymore." "What Kind of World" would serve the purpose of tackling both arguments.

"Come So Far" tells the story of a young man who tries to travel from Afghanistan to London to save his life. It documents what he has to give up - materially, culturally, and emotionally - in order to make the move.

In 2018, Bailey joined the B-52s and Culture Club on the United States leg of the Life Tour, and Culture Club and Belinda Carlisle on the UK leg, to promote his new album.

== Track listing ==
All tracks are written by Tom Bailey, excluding "What Kind of World" by Tom Bailey and Hal Ritson.

No.	Title	Length
1.	"Science Fiction"	4:18
2.	"What Kind of World"	5:30
3.	"Shooting Star"	4:40
4.	"Feels Like Love to Me"	4:28
5.	"Blue"	3:42
6.	"If You Need Someone"	5:06
7.	"Ship of Fools"	4:03
8.	"Work All Day"	3:16
9.	"Bring Back Yesterday"	5:30
10.	"Come So Far"	3:37
Total length:		44:10

== Critical reception ==
Professional ratings
Review scores
Source	Rating
Express & Star	6/10
The Scotsman	3/5 stars
The Times	2/5 stars
Classic Pop	4/5 stars
Louder Than War	Favourable
Cryptic Rock	4/5 stars

Science Fiction received mostly positive reviews. Leigh Sanders of Express and Star said the album was filled of "thumping beats and zipped pop hooks" but believed the songs weren't mesmerizing enough. He gave the album a six out of ten.

Wyndham Wallace of Classic Pop found the album to be contemplative, cheerful, and comforting. He felt that "Science Fiction" was reminiscent of the Thompson Twins' single "Hold Me Now" in its "colourful ambitions" and "strong melodies". Wallace named the album "Best New Release" of July 2018.

Ellen Shapiro of Louder Than War agreed that the title track transports listeners back to the 1980s, musically. She named "Come So Far" as her favourite track due to its haunting lyrics and meaning, but also had a fondness for more jazzy songs like "Ship of Fools". She considered Science Fiction to have some of the best production and creativity she had heard, saying that there is "a need to hear it again and again". Alfie Vera Mella of Cryptic Rock shared similar sentiments; giving the album four out of five stars for its "fresh yet familiar" and "sophisticated but frivolous" sounds.

== Personnel ==
Musicians

- Tom Bailey - all instruments, lead vocals
- Tom Bailey, Miriam Stockley, Brendan Reilly - backing vocals
- Osvaldo Chacon - Cuban vocals on "What Kind of World"

Production

- Tom Bailey - producer
- Hal Ritson - vocals recorded and produced by, additional programming
- Robbie Bronnimann - mixing, mastering, additional production
- Wez Clarke - final mix (1-2)

Additional personnel

- Lauren Drescher - original artwork
- Emile Drescher - graphic design
- Steve Cripps - artwork formatting
- Steve Dykes - album rear cover photo

== Charts ==
Chart (2018)	Peak position
Scottish Albums (Official Charts)	68
