= José Francisco Salgado =

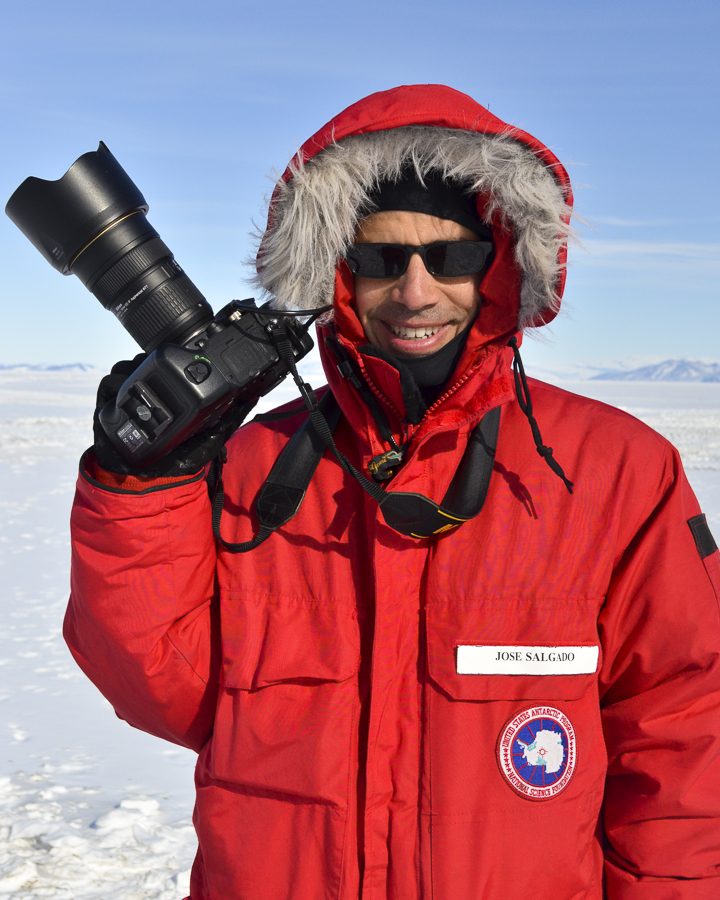
- José Francisco Salgado at McMurdo Station in Antarctica

Background information
- Born: José Francisco Salgado Alicea
- Origin: San Juan, Puerto Rico
- Occupations: Astronomer, visual artist
- Member of: Bailey-Salgado Project

José Francisco Salgado (born José Francisco Salgado Alicea in San Juan, Puerto Rico) is an astronomer, experimental photographer, visual artist, and public speaker. He is known to use art to communicate science in engaging ways. Salgado's Science & Symphony films have been presented in more than 278 concerts and 230 lectures reaching a combined audience of more than 500,000 people in 21 countries. Orchestras that have presented his films include the Chicago Symphony Orchestra, Boston Pops Orchestra, the San Francisco Symphony, Czech National Symphony Orchestra, Phoenix Symphony and Orchestra Teatro Regio Torino. Salgado is a member of the Bailey-Salgado Project, an audiovisual ensemble formed with composer and musician Tom Bailey (Thompson Twins/Babble, International Observer). He is also a contributing writer for Digital Photography Review.

== Education and career ==
Formally trained in Physics (BS, U. of Puerto Rico) and Astronomy (PhD, University of Michigan), José Francisco Salgado uses his skills in astronomy, education, and visual arts to create multimedia works that communicate science in engaging ways. In 2010 he co-founded KV 265, a non-profit organization whose mission is the communication of science through art and for which he serves as executive director. Prior to this position he worked from 2000 to 2015 as an astronomer and science visualizer at the Adler Planetarium in Chicago.

== Television ==
=== Host of Nuestra Galaxia ===
In February 2006, José Francisco Salgado started hosting Nuestra Galaxia, a news segment in the Noticias Univision Chicago (WGBO) 5 p.m. newscast. In the weekly segment Salgado featured astronomy news, skywatching information, and answers to questions submitted by viewers. That same year he was nominated for an Emmy Award for his work in the segment. Nuestra Galaxia concluded in 2008 with 110 segments aired. Salgado is interviewed regularly in newscasts and radio shows across the U.S. He has appeared twice on Chicago Tonight.

=== Contributions to Television Productions ===
José Francisco Salgado has contributed his photography and videos of astronomical observatories and the night sky to many science documentaries including:

- Outrageous Acts of Science (Science Channel TV series): "Bucket List" episode (first aired on 21 March 2017)
- Horizon (BBC TV series): "Seeing Stars" episode (aired 15 August 2011)

== Music Films ==
=== Science & Symphony films ===
In 2006, José Francisco Salgado produced and directed Gustav Holst's The Planets, a critically acclaimed, award-winning astronomy film to accompany live performances of the popular orchestral suite. The film features awe-inspiring images, historical illustrations, NASA and European Space Agency (ESA) animations, as well as science visualizations produced by Salgado. The film, which follows the tone and tempo set by the music, was premiered by the Chicago Sinfonietta. The reception by audience members and critics prompted a second Science & Symphony film entitled Astronomical Pictures at an Exhibition (premiered in May 2008 by the Chicago Sinfonietta) and a repeat concert of Gustav Holst's The Planets in Chicago's Millennium Park (Aug 2008).

Salgado's films were featured in the opening ceremony of the International Year of Astronomy (IYA2009) at the UNESCO Headquarters in Paris and were shown around the world as part of IYA2009 festivities. In 2014, his collaboration with composer Chris Theofanidis, The Legend of the Northern Lights was premiered with Grant Park Orchestra to critical acclaim on two nights in front of 32,000 people. By mid 2015, the films have been presented in more than 100 concerts and have reached a combined audience of more than 250,000 people in concert halls, museums, and lecture halls spanning 45 cities in 15 countries. Some of the orchestras that have presented these works include the Chicago Symphony Orchestra, the Boston Pops Orchestra (featuring Buzz Aldrin), the San Francisco Symphony, the National Symphony Orchestra, the Czech National Symphony Orchestra, the Victoria Symphony, the California Symphony, the Pacific Symphony, the Orchestra Teatro Regio Torino, the National Taiwan University Symphony Orchestra, and the Santa Fe Symphony Orchestra and Chorus, in addition to a 10-city tour in Spain. In Toledo, Spain the Astronomical Pictures at an Exhibition concert was honored with the Teatro de Rojas Best Concert of Season award.

Salgado's Science & Symphony films include:

- A la busca del más allá (Music by Joaquín Rodrigo)
- Liquify (Music by Michael Abels)
- Moontides (Music by John Estacio)
- Nocturnes (in production; Music by Claude Debussy)
- Aurora Triptych (2017; Music by John Estacio)
- Carol of the Lights — commissioned by Boston Pops (2016; Music by Ottorino Respighi)
- Solaris (2017; Music by John Estacio) - Part I of Aurora Triptych
- Borealis / Wondrous Light (2015, 2017; Music by John Estacio) - Parts II & III of Aurora Triptych
- The Legend of the Northern Lights (2014; Music by Christopher Theofanidis)
- Clair de lune (2013; Music by Claude Debussy, arr. Luck)
- Over the Earth in 90 Minutes (2013; Music by Hector Berlioz)
- Over the Beautiful Blue Planet (2011; Music by Johann Strauss II)
- Moonrise (2011; Music by Maurice Ravel)
- 3D Universe (2009; 3D version of Astronomical Pictures at an Exhibition)
- The Universe at an Exhibition (2008, 2015; Music by Modest Mussorgsky, orch. by Maurice Ravel)
- Gustav Holst's The Planets (2006; Music by Gustav Holst)

=== Bailey-Salgado Project (BSP) ===
In 2010 Salgado joined with musician and composer Tom Bailey to form the audiovisual ensemble Bailey-Salgado Project (BSP). BSP combines music with photography, video, and motion graphics to create multimedia works that have as their subject the physical world. Their first work together, the short film entitled Sidereal Motion, was premiered in Bath, England on 27 October 2010. Subsequently, they have presented their works in San Juan, Chicago, and Valencia.

Their works include:

- Moonrise (2012)
- Sketches for Moonrise (2011)
- The Carina Nebula (2011)
- Staring at the Sun (2011)
- Sidereal Motion (2010)

== Photography and illustrations ==
José Francisco Salgado is a contributing writer for Digital Photography Review. He writes photo techniques and equipment, especially those used in astrophotography. His photographs, composites, and illustrations have been published in magazines and science books, and shown in cities such as San Juan, Belgrade, Chicago, and Paris. Salgado, a two-time Photoshop Guru Award finalist, has photographed 17 astronomical observatories around the world. In 2010 he was named ESO Photo Ambassador by the European Southern Observatory for his photographic work done at the European observatories in Chile. Salgado experiments with high dynamic range imaging, time-lapse, infrared, fisheye, and stereoscopic photography to enhance his multimedia works.

=== Selected contributions to books ===
100 New Scientific Discoveries, 2011, Time Inc., ISBN 978-1-60320-172-8, ISBN 1-60320-172-6
Einstein's Telescope: The Hunt for Dark Matter and Dark Energy in the Universe, E. Gates, 2009. W. W. Norton, ISBN 978-0-393-06238-0
Astrolies, N. Stanic & M. Tadic, Belgrade, 2005. Zavod, ISBN 86-17-12940-9
Zvezdani Gradovi. Galaksije–Putovanje Kroz Vreme (Starry Cities. Galaxies–Traveling Through Time), N. Stanic, Belgrade, 2004. Zavod, ISBN 86-17-12164-5
Children of the Stars, D. R. Altschuler, 2002. Cambridge University Press, ISBN 0-521-81212-7

=== Selected Contributions to magazines ===
Ciel et Espace, Dec 2010
Cornell Magazine, May/June 1993

== Honors and accomplishments ==
- 2018 Recipient of a National Endowment for the Arts Art Works grant through his work with KV 265
- 2016 Commission from Boston Pops for a film which was presented 33 times in front of almost 75,000 people
- 2016 Recipient of a National Endowment for the Arts Art Works grant through his work with KV 265
- 2015 U. of Michigan Astronomy 2015 Distinguished Alumni Lecture: Science & Symphony Films
- 2014 The Legend of the Northern Lights premiered to critical acclaim in front of 32,000 people
- 2010 Citibank's Hispanic Heritage Award
- 2010 Best Teatro de Rojas Concert Award feat. Astron. Pictures at an Exhibition, (Toledo, Spain)
- 2010 Named ESO Photo Ambassador by the European Southern Observatory
- 2009 Distinguished Alumnus, School of Natural Sciences, U. of Puerto Rico
- 2009 Lecturer, Distinguished Lecture Series of the School of Art and Design, U. of Michigan
- 2009 Two of his films named Special Project of the International Year of Astronomy (IYA2009)
- 2008 AstroFilm Festival Piešťany, Slovakia, Audience Award for Gustav Holst's The Planets
- 2007 Emmy Award nomination for Nuestra Galaxia news segment
