= Doctor! Doctor! =

- Cover photography by Peter Ashworth

Single by Thompson Twins

from the album Into the Gap
- B-side: "Nurse Shark"
- Released: 27 January 1984
- Recorded: Late 1983
- Genre: Synth-pop; new wave
- Length: 3:46 (Promo Version); 4:39 (Album/Single Version)
- Label: Arista
- Songwriters: Tom Bailey; Alannah Currie; Joe Leeway
- Producers: Tom Bailey; Alex Sadkin

Thompson Twins singles chronology
"Hold Me Now" (1983)	"Doctor! Doctor!" (1984)	"You Take Me Up" (1984)

"Doctor! Doctor!" is a song performed by the British new wave band Thompson Twins. It is the second single from the band's fourth studio album, Into the Gap (1984). It was written by Tom Bailey, Alannah Currie and Joe Leeway, and prominently features a keyboard solo. Following the successful chart performances of the Into the Gap single "Hold Me Now", "Doctor! Doctor!" was released in the UK on 27 January 1984 as the album's second single.

== Background and recording ==
In 1983, after the commercial success of their third album Quick Step & Side Kick, the Thompson Twins collaborated again with producer Alex Sadkin to record Into the Gap at Compass Point Studios in the Bahamas. Tom Bailey co-produced the album's tracks with Sadkin, including "Doctor! Doctor!".

== Release ==
The single peaked at No. 3 in the United Kingdom and No. 11 in the United States in July 1984. The song also peaked at No. 18 on the US Dance chart in the same year, and the Top 20 in Canada, Germany, Switzerland, New Zealand, Australia and South Africa. In the UK, it was the 29th-best-selling single of 1984.

Sleeve photography was by Peter Ashworth.

== Music video ==
Bailey in the music video for "Doctor! Doctor!".

The promotional music video was directed by Dieter 'Dee' Trattmann. It was released in 1984 and received heavy rotation on MTV.

The video opens on a scene of darkness, shifting clouds and a rising moon. Electronic music begins to play. A keyboard with hands playing superimposes over the silhouette of blocks like buildings. People appear against the backdrop of moon and clouds with a couple on ice skates just behind Tom Bailey as he begins to sing. The scene shifts quickly to a woman standing alone (Alannah Currie), then to Currie playing drums and Joe Leeway playing keyboard. As Bailey sings, the characters behind him act out the lyrics, intercut with shots of the band playing their instruments. As the song continues, Bailey, Currie and Leeway join the characters to act out the lyrics around blocks emitting smoke. The skaters and actors perform during the synthesizer solo. The scene continues to shift between the singer, the band playing, the actors and the ice skaters moving and turning. The video fades out in the same sequence it began, changing from the characters to the blocks against the sky, and then to the distant moon and shifting clouds.

An alternative edit of the video features more of the band playing instruments (e.g., Currie playing percussion and Bailey playing the synthesizer while the ice skaters dance) and less interaction with the other characters.

== Track listing ==
- 12" single (601 182)
1. "Doctor! Doctor! (Extended Version)" – 7:50
2. "Nurse Shark" – 4:05
- 7" single Arista (ARI 8366)
1. "Doctor! Doctor!" – 4:30
2. "Nurse Shark" – 4:07
- 7" promo single Arista (AS 1–9209)
1. "Doctor! Doctor! (Short Edit)" – 3:46
2. "Doctor! Doctor!" – 4:29

== Official versions ==
1. Promo Version – 3:46
2. Album Version – 4:39
3. Extended Version – 7:50
4. Live from Thompson Twins Live – 5:53
5. Introduction sample (from The Thompson Twins Adventure) – 0:50

== Charts ==
=== Weekly charts ===
Chart (1984)	Peak position
Australia (Kent Music Report)	14
Belgium (Ultratop 50 Flanders)	26
Belgium (VRT Top 30 Flanders)	22
Canada Top Singles (RPM)	11
Canada (CHUM)	12
Ireland (IRMA)	5
Netherlands (Single Top 100)	23
Netherlands (Dutch Top 40)	24
New Zealand (Recorded Music NZ)	12
South Africa (Springbok Radio)	20
Switzerland (Schweizer Hitparade)	11
UK Singles (Official Charts)	3
US Billboard Hot 100	11
US Adult Contemporary (Billboard)	35
US Mainstream Rock (Billboard)	12
US Dance/Disco Top 80 (Billboard)	18
US Cash Box	10
West Germany (GfK)	11

=== Year-end charts ===
Chart (1984)	Rank
Canada Top Singles (RPM)	76
UK Singles (OCC)	29
US Cash Box Top 100	75

== Certifications ==
Region	Certification	Certified units/sales
United Kingdom (BPI)	Silver	250,000^{^}
^{^} Shipments figures based on certification alone.

== See also ==
- 1984 in British music
