= Richard Myhill =

British musician

- Born: Richard Myhill Yarrow; November 1946 (age 79); Chorleywood, Hertfordshire
- Genres: Pop; library
- Occupations: Singer; songwriter; musician; composer; producer; arranger
- Instruments: Vocals, keyboard, percussion
- Years active: 1973–present

Richard Myhill is a British singer-songwriter, musician, composer, producer and arranger, who had a top 20 single in the UK singles charts in 1978, and who worked on Duran Duran tracks in the early 1980s.

== Biography ==
Myhill was the son of a jazz keyboardist, who would sometimes accompany his father in amateur shows, playing a small piano while wearing a Cub Scout uniform. After studying graphics and commercial art at college, he worked producing television adverts, until signed to EMI Records in 1973 as a songwriter, and he released his debut album 21 Days In Soho in 1975. He then left EMI and returned to advertising as a jingle writer, until, in 1977, producer Phil Wainman signed Myhill up to his new Mercury Records sub-label, Utopia.

His first single on Utopia, "It Takes Two To Tango", reached number 17 in the UK singles chart; as of 2025, it is his only chart success, and also earned him a place on the 30 March 1978 edition of Top Of The Pops, which featured him dancing with a dummy. The 7" single was an early example of innovative vinyl, being available in a square format.

In 1981, producer Colin Thurston requested Myhill work on string arrangements for the Duran Duran track "Tel Aviv", which was the first time the band used an orchestra for their recordings. This was followed by string arrangements on the single version of "My Own Way", which also made the UK charts, and some other tracks.

Myhill has been credited on many film and TV soundtracks, including one of the themes for The Chart Show (also used in the NBA Furious Finishes video cassette), and his track "Trans Am Highway" being used as a theme for World Championship Wrestling's television shows in the late 1980s. He has also been the director of his publishing company, Mysongs Limited, since 1973. His song “Too Much” appears in Tim Burton’s movie “Dark Shadows”; starring Johnny Depp and Helena Bonham Carter.

== Partial discography ==
Albums:

- 21 Days In Soho (1975)
- Up Front (1983)
- Project (1984)

Singles & EPs:

- "Oh! Doctor" (1974)
- "It Takes Two To Tango" (1978) UK no. 17
- "We've Got Something More" (1978)
- "While London Dances"
- "She Can Can-Can" / "Oh Babe" (1979)

Soundtracks:

- The Frog Prince (composer: additional music, music arranger) (1986)
- Blockbusters (TV series) ("Run Don't Walk") (1987)
- The Further Adventures of Tennessee Buck ("Don't Talk-Dance") (1988)
- Prick Up Your Ears (music arranger: song) (1987)
- Rambling Rose ("Sidewalk Stomp Rag") (1991)
- Rocko's Modern Life (TV series) (1994)
- Best Laid Plans (writer: "Faithful & True") (1999)
- Le Gout des Autres (music: "Business International") (2000)
- Slap Shot 2: Breaking the Ice (video) (writer: "Go Sport!") (2002)
- Spin (writer: "Let Me Baby") (2003)
- The Hitcher II: I've Been Waiting (video) (writer: "You Must Be An Angel") (2003)
