= Here's to Future Days =

1985 studio album by Thompson Twins

Studio album by Thompson Twins
- Released: 20 September 1985
- Recorded: 1984–1985
- Studios: Marcadet (Paris); Guillaume Tell (Suresnes, France); Skyline (New York City)
- Genres: Pop; rock
- Length: 42:52
- Label: Arista
- Producers: Tom Bailey; Nile Rodgers; Alex Sadkin

Thompson Twins chronology
Into the Gap (1984)	Here's to Future Days (1985)	Close to the Bone (1987)

Singles from Here's to Future Days
- 1. "Lay Your Hands on Me" Released: 26 November 1984; 2. "Don't Mess with Doctor Dream" Released: 19 August 1985; 3. "King for a Day" Released: 11 October 1985; 4. "Revolution" Released: 29 November 1985; 5. "Future Days" Released: 1986 (Australia)

Professional ratings
Review scores
Source	Rating
AllMusic	4/5 stars
Encyclopedia of Popular Music	2/5 stars
Record Collector	4/5 stars
Rolling Stone	Favourable
The Rolling Stone Album Guide	2.5/5 stars
Smash Hits	5/10

Here's to Future Days is the fifth studio album by the British pop band Thompson Twins, released on 20 September 1985 by Arista Records. It was the third and final release for the band as a trio, which was their most successful and recognisable line-up. It peaked at No. 5 on the UK Albums Chart and No. 20 on the US Billboard 200.

Before the album's release, the Thompson Twins performed at Live Aid in July 1985, where they revealed their new material by playing a rock-oriented version of the Beatles' song "Revolution". The band were also joined onstage for this number by Nile Rodgers (who co-produced the album), Madonna, and guitarist Steve Stevens, perhaps best known for his work with Billy Idol.

Although the album was a chart success in the UK and the US, it was considerably less successful than their previous studio album Into the Gap (1984). Subsequent singles from the album also met with mixed results. The new Nile Rodgers-produced version of "Lay Your Hands on Me" (now with a more distinct gospel sound) reached No. 6 in the United States, while the next UK single "Don't Mess with Doctor Dream" reached No. 15. "King for a Day" followed in both markets, peaking at No. 8 in the US and becoming their third and final Top 10 hit there, but only reaching No. 22 in the UK. The aforementioned "Revolution" was also released as a single in the UK, but failed to make the top 40, signifying an end to the Thompson Twins' commercial viability there.

The US and Canadian pressing of the vinyl album does not include the track "Breakaway" but contained a new, Nile Rodgers-produced version of the track "Roll Over", though the song was omitted altogether in all other countries. The US and Canadian cassette and CD versions of the album contain both "Roll Over" and "Breakaway".

== Recording and production ==
Following on from the band's highly successful fourth studio album, Into the Gap (1984), the writing and recording of Here's to Future Days began in late 1984 with the single "Lay Your Hands on Me", which was co-produced by Alex Sadkin and lead vocalist and guitarist Tom Bailey. Sadkin had produced the last two Thompson Twins studio albums, which were the band's biggest commercial successes to date, and the new single climbed to No. 13 on the UK Singles Chart. However, the band subsequently decided to part company with Sadkin and set about working on the new studio album with Bailey taking sole responsibility as producer at Marcadet Studios in Paris, using a 3M digital 32-track recorder. It was there that most of the backing tracks were put together.

In March 1985, with the album nearing completion and the next single "Roll Over" just about to be released in the UK, Tom Bailey suddenly fell ill. After collapsing in his hotel room, he was diagnosed with nervous exhaustion and ordered to rest by doctors. The incident prompted the band to recall all copies of "Roll Over", despite the fact that some of them had already been shipped to retail outlets. Bailey then took time off in Barbados to recuperate. Holding off on the album's release led the band to reconsider the entire project, and they began work on it again following Bailey's recovery. This time they enlisted Nile Rodgers to co-produce and help salvage the project at Bailey's suggestion, after having met him in New York during the break and discovering how well they both got on creatively. The new recordings were more strongly oriented toward the use of electric guitars.

From early June to early August 1985, additional overdubs and mixing of Here's to Future Days took place at Skyline Studios in New York City with Rodgers assisting as co-producer; the only two major interruptions to recording were the US Independence day celebrations on 4 July and Live Aid on 13 July. Since the band had recorded on more than 24 tracks, two synchronized 24-track tape machines were used for transferring the Marcadet recordings. Concerning the use of electric guitars, Bailey commented:

"I knew before we went into the studio for this album that we'd avoided guitars for long enough, and that now was the time to use them. It was almost as if I wanted to make something that was more of a rock album and less of an electronic pop one."

== Track listing ==
=== LP: Arista 207164 ===
All tracks are written by Tom Bailey, Alannah Currie and Joe Leeway, except where noted.

Side one
No.	Title	Writer(s)	Length
1.	"Don't Mess with Doctor Dream"		4:25
2.	"Lay Your Hands on Me"		4:22
3.	"Future Days"		3:00
4.	"You Killed the Clown"		4:54
5.	"Revolution"	John Lennon; Paul McCartney	4:06

Side two
No.	Title	Length
1.	"King for a Day"	5:22
2.	"Love Is the Law"	4:45
3.	"Emperor's Clothes (Part 1)"	4:46
4.	"Tokyo"	3:39
5.	"Breakaway"	3:34

Some UK copies came with a "free 5-track album of re-mixes" (this disc having cat. no. FRE TT 1). The remixes were also included as bonus tracks on the cassette version of the album.

Re-Mixes Side A
No.	Title	Remixer	Length
1.	"Shoot Out" (Engineered by Jay Mark)	Tom Bailey	6:23
2.	"Alice"	Nile Rodgers; Tom Bailey	4:59
3.	"Heavens Above!"	Jay Mark	3:20

Re-Mixes Side B
No.	Title	Remixer	Length
1.	"The Kiss"	Jay Mark	5:44
2.	"Desert Dancers"	Jay Mark	7:05

=== 2008 expanded edition ===
On 4 August 2008, Here's to Future Days was digitally remastered and reissued as a 2-disc set by Edsel Records . The reissue includes the five bonus remixes that originally appeared on the cassette version of the album in 1985, and also features most of the major 12" versions and B-sides, some of which appear on CD for the very first time.

Disc one

1. "Don't Mess with Doctor Dream" – 4:25
2. "Lay Your Hands on Me" – 4:21
3. "Future Days" – 3:00
4. "You Killed the Clown" – 4:52
5. "Revolution" – 4:05
6. "King for a Day" – 5:18
7. "Love Is the Law" – 4:43
8. "Emperor's Clothes (Part 1)" – 4:45
9. "Tokyo" – 3:38
10. "Breakaway" – 3:33
11. "Roll Over" – 4:58 – Bonus Track (Album version that only appeared on North American copies of the original album in 1985)
12. "Shoot Out" – 6:22 (Remix of "Don't Mess with Doctor Dream" that appeared previously on the UK 12" single known as the "[(U4A)+(U3A)=REMIX]", catalogue number TWINS229)
13. "Alice" – 4:59 (Instrumental version of "Lay Your Hands On Me")
14. "Heavens Above!" – 3:19 (Instrumental remix of "Future Days")
15. "The Kiss" – 5:42 (Remix of "Tokyo")
16. "Desert Dancers" – 7:07 (Remix of "Breakaway")

Disc two

1. "Lay Your Hands on Me" (Original UK 12" Version) – 6:05
2. "The Lewis Carol (Adventures in Wonderland)" – 4:14 (Original B-Side of the "Lay Your Hands on Me" UK 7" and 12" singles)
3. "Lay Your Hands on Me (US Re-Mix)" – 6:23
4. "Lay Your Hands on Me (Extended Version)" – 6:00 (12" version of the album version)
5. "Roll Over (Again)" – 6:50 (Previously unreleased 12" mix of "Roll Over")
6. "Fools in Paradise (Extended Mix)" – 5:25 (B-Side of the "King for a Day" 12" single)
7. "Don't Mess with Doctor Dream (Smackattack!)" – 6:10 (Original 12" version)
8. "Very Big Business" – 5:06 (B-Side of "Don't Mess with Doctor Dream" 12" single)
9. "King for a Day (Extended Mix)" – 8.02 (Original 12" version)
10. "Rollunder" – 6:50 (Previously unreleased B-Side of the "Roll Over" 12" single)
11. "King for a Day (U.S. Re-Mix)" – 7:20 (Original second 12" version)
12. "The Fourth Sunday" – 4:18 (B-Side of the "Revolution" 7" and 12" singles)
13. "Revolution (Extended Mix)" – 5:58 (Original UK 12" single)

== Personnel ==
=== Musicians ===
Thompson Twins

- Tom Bailey – lead vocals, synthesizers, pianos, Fairlight CMI programming, guitars, double bass, drum programming
- Joe Leeway – E-mu Emulator, synth bass, congas, backing vocals
- Alannah Currie – acoustic drums, percussion, marimba, xylophone, backing vocals

Additional musicians

- Nile Rodgers – guitars, backing vocals
- Steve Stevens – guitars ("Revolution", "Breakaway", "Roll Over")
- Steve Elsin – tenor saxophone ("You Killed the Clown")
- East Harlem Hobo Choir – backing vocals ("Lay Your Hands on Me", "Future Days")

=== Technical ===
- Tom Bailey – producer (1, 3–10)
- Nile Rodgers – producer (1, 3–10)
- Alex Sadkin – producer (2)
- James Farber – engineer (1, 3–10), mixing
- John "Tokes" Potoker – engineer (1, 3–10)
- Terry Becker – engineer (2)
- Scott Ansell – second engineer
- Olivier De Bosson – second engineer
- Knut Bøhn – additional second engineer
- Jay Mark – additional engineer
- Lee Charteris – technical assistant
- Steve Dewey – technical assistant
- Alex Melnyk – project coordinator
- Alannah Currie – art direction
- Andie Airfix – design, artwork
- Rebecca Blake – photography

== Charts ==
=== Weekly charts ===
Weekly chart performance for Here's to Future Days
Chart (1985–1986)	Peak position
Australian Albums (Kent Music Report)	8
Canada Top Albums/CDs (RPM)	14
Dutch Albums (Album Top 100)	42
European Albums (Eurotipsheet)	16
German Albums (Offizielle Top 100)	42
Italian Albums (Musica e dischi)	20
New Zealand Albums (RMNZ)	1
Norwegian Albums (VG-lista)	9
Swedish Albums (Sverigetopplistan)	7
Swiss Albums (Schweizer Hitparade)	12
UK Albums (Official Charts)	5
US Billboard 200	20

=== Year-end charts ===
1985 year-end chart performance for Here's to Future Days
Chart (1985)	Position
Canada Top Albums/CDs (RPM)	53

1986 year-end chart performance for Here's to Future Days
Chart (1986)	Position
Australian Albums (Kent Music Report)	74
New Zealand Albums (RMNZ)	11
US Billboard 200	57

== Certifications ==
Certifications for Here's to Future Days
Region	Certification	Certified units/sales
Canada (Music Canada)	Platinum	100,000^{^}
New Zealand (RMNZ)	Platinum	15,000^{^}
United Kingdom (BPI)	Gold	100,000^{^}
United States (RIAA)	Gold	500,000^{^}
^{^} Shipments figures based on certification alone.
