= Seen (album) =

Studio album by International Observer
- Released: 2001
- Genre: Alternative, post-punk
- Length: 49:39
- Label: Different Drummer
- Producer: International Observer

International Observer chronology
Seen (2001)	All Played Out (2005)

Seen is the debut album from International Observer, the solo project of former Thompson Twins and Babble musician Tom Bailey. Released in 2001, an EP of the same name was released a year later featuring a different mix of existing album track "Vale" along with the new track "London". The track "Barone" was featured in the film Whale Rider.

== Track listing for the Seen album ==
1. "Vale" - 6:23
2. "Minicell" - 6:27
3. "Barone" - 3:18
4. "Flat" - 4:38
5. "Zoom Lo Fi" - 5:12
6. "Friday Afternoon Dub" - 6:19
7. "Indicator Dub" - 4:58
8. "Flip-Flop Cemetery" - 6:05
9. "Now a Major Motion Picture" - 6:15

== Track listing for the Seen: EP ==
12" LP only release.

Side A:

1. "London" (new song)
2. "Flip-Flop Cemetery"

Side B:

1. "Barone"
2. "Vale (6/8 Bengal Version)"
