= Hold Me Now (Thompson Twins song) =

Single by Thompson Twins

from the album Into the Gap
- B-side: "Let Loving Start"
- Released: November 1983 (UK); February 1984 (US)
- Studio: RAK, London
- Genre: New wave; synth-pop
- Length: 4:44
- Label: Arista
- Songwriters: Tom Bailey; Alannah Currie; Joe Leeway
- Producers: Tom Bailey; Alex Sadkin

Thompson Twins singles chronology
"Watching" (1983)	"Hold Me Now" (1983)	"Doctor! Doctor!" (1984)

Music video
- "Hold Me Now" on YouTube

"Hold Me Now" is a song by British band the Thompson Twins. Written by the band members, the song was produced by Alex Sadkin and the group's lead vocalist Tom Bailey. The song is a mid-tempo new wave song that uses a varied instrumentation, including keyboards, a xylophone, a piano and Latin percussion. It was released in November 1983 as the first single from their fourth studio album, Into the Gap.

Released in the United Kingdom in late 1983, the song peaked at number four on the UK Singles Chart in November of that year. It was certified gold by the British Phonographic Industry (BPI) in 1983, becoming the band's biggest-selling single, and their first top five in that country. The song was released in the United States in February 1984. It also became the band's highest charting single there, peaking at number three on the Billboard Hot 100 in May, remaining on the chart for 21 weeks. In addition, the song topped Billboard's Hot Dance Club Play chart for one week in April 1984.

== Background and recording ==
"Emotionally, it was written as the result of some argument that was resolved between Alannah and myself", explained Tom Bailey in an August 2014 interview with Songfacts. "We actually decided, well, this is an interesting emotional subject. What it feels like to get back together again after separation and the kind of ideas that come up and the way that emotion and physicality somehow are brought together." According to Bailey, the song also "had a very strong idea" behind it and was written in only half an hour.

When they were going to record the song, Bailey said that he was excited, nervous, and "almost over-prepared for it", he knew exactly what instruments were going on every track; it took three days to record. The band intended to record it with producer Alex Sadkin and engineer Phil Thornalley – both of whom they worked with previously on Quick Step & Side Kick – but they were unavailable, finishing off Duran Duran's Seven and the Ragged Tiger album in Australia. Thus the group recorded "Hold Me Now" at RAK Studios, London with Bailey producing – hence the latter's sole producer credit was printed on the single sleeves in early pressings. Eventually, both Sadkin and Thornalley returned from Australia and helped finish the song, with Bailey laying down the final lead vocals – hence Sadkin's co-producer credit on the labels.

Thornalley remembered going straight from the airport to the studio and mixing "Hold Me Now" – Sadkin, having made sure all was at the right technical standards, would usually sit back and let Thornalley mix while "on fire"; though his credit would appear on later editions of the single. About the process Bailey commented: "You know what a great producer is? It's someone who takes great ideas and makes them into good records. In our field, great music is a hit record." The song became the Thompson Twins' biggest hit in America, but at the same time it pressured the band to produce top-selling music, even if they were not completely comfortable with that, as Alannah Currie stated in an interview with David Oriard of The Spokesman-Review:

The biggest trouble that we've had basically is that the song, "Hold Me Now" was a huge hit, it was really big here, it was really big all over the world. Which is great, but it was just an accidental thing. It was just a song that we wrote. But after that then, we got everybody—managers, the record company—on our back to write "Hold Me Now, Part 2" and harassing you to try and find a formula. But we can't really. We'll never find a formula for what we did. And that upsets some of them.

== Composition ==
"Hold Me Now"
A 30-second sample from "Hold Me Now", featuring Bailey singing the chorus, Leeway performing the harmonies, and a backing track that employs a marimba and Latin percussion played by Currie.

"Hold Me Now" is a pop, new wave and synthpop ballad, performed with a "hypnotic, swaying groove", that features the sound of a marimba in the background. The song is composed in the key of D major, with a time signature set in common time, and moves at a moderate tempo of 108 beats per minute.

While most of the group's previous songs have a dance-oriented sound, "Hold Me Now" has a mainstream piano-based melody but keeps the prominent bass line and Currie's Latin percussion of earlier releases. The song is in a verse-chorus form, employing a simple melody. The end chorus, which includes Leeway performing the song's harmonies, repeats for a full minute and a half, nearly one-third of the song's full length.

== Critical reception ==
Originally, "Hold Me Now" received a mixed response from pop music critics. In a review of the group's album Into the Gap, Parke Puterbaugh, from Rolling Stone magazine, said that the band took a "new and drastic tangent" and that they "have slowed it all down to bring the human factor into clearer focus", adding that "Hold Me Now" maintains a "hypnotic, swaying groove that suggests reserves of pastoral contentment even in the wake of the storm".

Robert Christgau, in a review for The Village Voice, said that the song "is a classic on chord changes alone, even though Tom Bailey sings it", adding that nothing else in the album Into the Gap "approaches its heart-tugging mastery". J. D. Considine, in a review for The Washington Post, commented that the song's melody adds "accessibility but could easily turn to dreary monotony".

Two decades later, the song received positive reviews from critics. Jose F. Promis from AllMusic commented that "years later [it] still sounded as fresh and innocent as when it was first released". Stewart Mason, also from AllMusic, commented that the song is an unexpected departure from the group's previous dance-oriented sound, comparing it with Spandau Ballet's "True", adding that "Bailey is not actually technically very good, but he's clearly trying very hard", and felt that the song "is a bit labored [...] but overall, 'Hold Me Now' deserved its huge hit status". Raymond Fiore from Entertainment Weekly said that the song "still sounds good today" and called it "the sound of new wave-pop brilliance".

In 2005, the song ranked #308 in Blender's list of the 500 Greatest Songs Since You Were Born, describing it as "a new wave let's-stay-together plea" that is "so cornball it works".

== Music video ==
The music video for "Hold Me Now" was directed by Rupert James, produced by Tim Bevan, and edited by Brian Grant and Nick Morris. The video features the Thompson Twins in a set with a blue background. Each member is standing on a platform, singing or playing a different instrument, a guitar or a piano for Bailey, a marimba or another percussion instrument for Currie, and a bass guitar or congas for Leeway. The video is heavily edited, with frames sliding from the sides, doubling or tripling, split-screen edits, and close-ups of the band while singing or dancing. At the end the background changes from blue to red, and the three members are featured together singing and clapping while the song is fading out.

== Chart performance ==
"Hold Me Now" was released in the United Kingdom in November 1983, debuting on the UK Singles Chart at number 31, peaking at number four, and staying in the chart for 15 weeks. It became the band's first top five in the country, and their biggest seller earning a gold certification by the British Phonographic Industry (BPI) in January 1984. Despite its late release in November 1983 it was one of the top 40 best selling singles in the UK that year at number 32. The song also reached the top 10 in Germany and Ireland, and peaking at number 18 in Switzerland.

The single was released in North America in February 1984. In Canada the single peaked at number three on The Record's singles chart and entered the RPM singles chart at number 43, peaking at number three on 28 April 1984. The Canadian Recording Industry Association (CRIA) certified "Hold Me Now" gold in May 1984. In the United States the single entered the Billboard Hot 100 on 11 February 1984 at number 73, peaking at number three on 5 May 1984, and staying 21 weeks on the chart, becoming the band's biggest hit in the country. In addition, it topped Billboard's Hot Dance Club Play chart for a week on 28 April 1984, becoming the band's third number-one single on this chart.

== Usage in media ==
The track was used in the interactive film Black Mirror: Bandersnatch (2018) directed by David Slade, in which the viewer can choose between "Thompson Twins" (Hold Me Now) or "Now 2" (Here Comes the Rain Again by Eurythmics) for the character Stefan Butler (played by Fionn Whitehead) to play the song from his cassette player.

== Formats and track listing ==
- 7" single
1. "Hold Me Now" – 4:44
2. "Let Loving Start" – 3:43
- 12" maxi-single
1. "Hold Me Now" (Extended version) – 9:54
2. "Let Loving Start" (Extended version) – 9:09

== Credits and personnel ==
- Tom Bailey – lead vocals, guitar, bass guitar, piano, keyboards, producer
- Alannah Currie – percussion, xylophone, drums, backing vocals
- Joe Leeway – congas, backing vocals
- Alex Sadkin – producer
- Phil Thornalley – audio mixing
- Adrian Peacock – photography
- Satori (from ideas by Alannah Currie) – design/artwork

== Charts ==
=== Weekly charts ===
Weekly chart
Chart (1983–1984)	Peak position
Australia (Kent Music Report)	3
Canada (The Record)	3
Canada Top Singles (RPM)	3
Germany (Official German Charts)	7
Ireland (IRMA)	9
New Zealand (Recorded Music NZ)	4
Paraguay (UPI)	1
South Africa (Springbok Radio)	8
Switzerland (Schweizer Hitparade)	18
UK Singles (Official Charts)	4
US Billboard Hot 100	3
US Adult Contemporary (Billboard)	8
US Dance Club Songs (Billboard)	1
US Mainstream Rock (Billboard)	9

=== Year-end charts ===
1983 year-end chart
Chart (1983)	Positions
UK Singles (OCC)	57

1984 year-end chart
Chart (1984)	Positions
Australia (Kent Music Report)	27
Canada Top Singles (RPM)	24
New Zealand (Recorded Music NZ)	29
US Billboard Hot 100	23

== Certifications ==
Certifications
Country	Provider	Certification
Canada	CRIA	Gold
United Kingdom	BPI	Gold

Region	Certification	Certified units/sales
New Zealand (RMNZ)	Platinum	30,000^{‡}
^{‡} Sales+streaming figures based on certification alone.

== Cover versions ==
- Jamaican reggae and dancehall singer Wayne Wonder covered the song for the soundtrack in 2004 film 50 First Dates.
- American alternative rock band Lazlo Bane covered the song for their 2012 EP Guilty Pleasures the 80's Volume 1.
- Eden xo released a cover of the song in 2015, featured in the comedy-horror television series Scream Queens.
- Lena Hall performed the song in season one episode four of Your Friends & Neighbors (TV series) and her rendition was released as a track on Songs From Your Friends & Neighbors in April 2025.
