= Ether (Babble album) =

Studio album by Babble
- Released: February 27, 1996
- Length: 53:15
- Label: Reprise/Warner Bros. Records; 46012
- Producer: Tom Bailey; Alannah Currie; Keith Fernley

Babble chronology
The Stone (1993)	Ether (1996)

Ether is the second and last album by Babble, an electronic dance band that was composed of Tom Bailey, Alannah Currie (formerly of the Thompson Twins), and Keith Fernley.

== Critical reception ==
Professional ratings
Review scores
Source	Rating
AllMusic	2.5/5 stars
Cash Box	favourable

Upon release, Daina Darzin of Cash Box described the album as an "engaging mix of Indian music, spacey, weirdly spiritual-sounding electronics" and a "shimmering, undulating collection that manages to be ambient without becoming repetitive". Tom Demalon of AllMusic considered the album a "pleasant - if fairly unadventurous - listening experience". He added: "The most satisfying tracks are those on which Currie sings lead. But with the lyrics mostly consisting of simple phrases chanted repeatedly over repetitive, hypnotic rhythms, most of the tracks tend to blur into one another, leaving them indistinguishable."

== Track listing ==
1. "The Circle" - 5:41
2. "Just Like You" - 5:41
3. "Sun" - 6:47
4. "Love Has No Name" - 5:35
5. "Dark" - :53
6. "Tower" - 6:18
7. "Come Down" - 5:32
8. "Hold the Sky" - 4:57
9. "Into Ether" - 6:45
10. "Dreamfield" - 2:02
