= International Observer =

British-New Zealand musical duo

International Observer is a British-New Zealand musical duo formed by Tom Bailey, musician and ex-lead singer of the British band the Thompson Twins, which rose to fame during the 1980s. Its debut album, Seen, featured Māori visual artist Rakai Karaitiana as part of the project.

== Career ==
Following the ashes of both the Thompson Twins and the subsequent group Babble, Bailey began producing the New Zealand band Stellar* while still residing in the country (Bailey would subsequently move back to Europe in 2005). The success of this collaboration allowed him to focus on his music, which had moved into the world of dub music, or chill music, as it is sometimes referred to in New Zealand.

The initial venture into the public consciousness was through playing festivals in New Zealand. The success of his two-hour sets allowed Bailey to build a following for International Observer. When the time came to compile a studio recording, there were enough pieces to complete a boxed set. The debut release was Seen, which was released initially on the project's own IO Audio label. However, when the album emerged in the UK, the Birmingham-based dub label Different Drummer took on the task of distributing the album. After the release of the debut album and before Bailey's relocation to Europe, Karaitiana left the project.

The second album, All Played Out, was released in 2005 exclusively in New Zealand on the Round Trip label. The album included unreleased tracks that were initially recorded for the Seen album.

In 2007, the third album, Heard, had a more international release through Dubmission Records as Bailey relocated to France and perform live at several dates in the UK. For the widening audience of the project, and with aspirations towards the US market, Heard featured a mix of tracks from the All Played Out album, as well as "London" from the Seen EP, live and further unreleased cuts. The album also featured a cover created by his new wife, artist Lauren Drescher.

The fourth album, Felt, was released in 2009 and features a take on the classic folk song "House of the Rising Sun".

In 2018, Bailey released his fifth album Free from the Dungeons of Dub, which comprises thirteen tracks from his Dungeons of Dub series, gilded with the addition of three brand new dubs recorded over the last 18 months, one of which is an exclusive remix of the title track of his brand new pop album, Science Fiction.

Bailey formed an audiovisual project, The Bailey Salgado Project, collaborating with the renowned astronomer José Francisco Salgado in 2010.

== Discography ==
=== Albums ===
Year	Albums
2001	Seen
2005	All Played Out
2007	Heard
2009	Felt
2014	Touched
2015	Retouched
2018	Free from the Dungeons of Dub
