= Babble (band) =

British–New Zealand electronic dance group

- Babble in 1994; left to right: Tom Bailey, Keith Fernley and Alannah Currie.

Background information
- Origin: London, England
- Genres: Downtempo, trip hop
- Years active: 1992–1996
- Labels: Reprise, Warner
- Spinoff of: Thompson Twins
- Past members: Tom Bailey; Alannah Currie; Keith Fernley

Babble was a British-New Zealand electronic dance music group active in the 1990s. It was formed by Tom Bailey and Alannah Currie (formerly of the Thompson Twins), with Keith Fernley.

== History ==
Babble was established in 1992 when Tom Bailey and Alannah Currie decided to drop the Thompson Twins name and begin recording new music under the name Babble. The decision to adopt a new name stemmed from the duo's aspirations of exploring different musical ideas and recording more experimental music. During the spring of 1992, the duo approached their long-time engineer Keith Fernley and he joined Babble as a full time member. The trio then spent five weeks in India to collect sound and sample recordings for future recording use.

Babble's debut album The Stone was recorded at Bailey and Currie's home studio, the Sugar Shack, in London. British rapper Q-Tee provided rapping vocals on "Beautiful" and Quest vocalist Amey St. Cyr provided additional vocals on "Take Me Away" and "Tribe". Meanwhile, the band's first released track, "Chale Jao", was included on the soundtrack of the film Coneheads in 1993.

The Stone was originally set for release in the autumn of 1993, but was postponed until 8 March 1994. During 1993, "Beautiful" was issued in the UK as a 12-inch promotional single and "Tribe" was issued in the US as a 12-inch and CD promotional single. A full UK release for "Beautiful" was planned for the summer, but did not materialise. In 1994, "Take Me Away" was released as a single in the US (and as a 12-inch promotional single in the UK) and reached number 18 on the US Billboard Hot Dance Music Club Play chart. It was followed in the US by the double A-side single, "Beautiful"/"Tribe".

During 1994, Babble collaborated with American actress and singer Traci Lords on her debut studio album 1000 Fires, released by Radioactive Records in 1995. Babble wrote and produced three tracks for the album: "Fly", "I Want You" and "Father's Field". "Father's Field" was originally recorded with different lyrics and the title "Just Like Honey". It was re-recorded as "Father's Field" after Lords wrote her own set of lyrics.

In 1994, Bailey and Currie relocated to New Zealand and set up a new home studio there, which was used for the recording of the band's next album. Bailey and Currie began working on the new material themselves before Fernley arrived in New Zealand in early 1995. Ether was released on 27 February 1996. The album's only single, "Love Has No Name", which features vocals by New Zealand singer Teremoana Rapley, reached number 10 on the US Billboard Hot Dance Music Club Play chart. New Zealand singer Taisha Kuhtze provided vocals on "Sun" and "Tower".

Babble began recording demos for a third album, but Warner Brothers decided to drop the band from their roster and Babble then ceased further activities.

== Members ==
- Tom Bailey
- Alannah Currie
- Keith Fernley

== Discography ==
=== Studio albums ===
- The Stone (1994)
- Ether (1996)

=== Singles ===
- "Beautiful" (1993)
- "Tribe" (1993)
- "Take Me Away" (1994)
- "Beautiful"/"Tribe" (1994)
- "Love Has No Name" (1996)
