= Into the Gap =

1984 studio album by Thompson Twins

Studio album by Thompson Twins
- Released: 17 February 1984
- Recorded: Summer 1983 ("Hold Me Now"); November 1983 – January 1984
- Studios: Compass Point (Nassau, Bahamas); RAK (London)
- Genre: Pop
- Length: 42:33
- Label: Arista
- Producers: Alex Sadkin; Tom Bailey

Thompson Twins chronology
| Quick Step & Side Kick (1983) | Into the Gap (1984) | Here's to Future Days (1985) |

Singles from Into the Gap
- 1. "Hold Me Now" Released: 11 November 1983; 2. "Doctor! Doctor!" Released: 27 January 1984; 3. "You Take Me Up" Released: 23 March 1984; 4. "Sister of Mercy" Released: June 1984; 5. "The Gap" Released: November 1984; 6. "Day After Day" Released: 1984 (Barbados)

Into the Gap is the fourth studio album by the British pop band Thompson Twins, released on 17 February 1984 by Arista Records. The album was recorded during 1983 at Compass Point Studios, in Nassau, Bahamas, and was produced by Alex Sadkin who had produced the band's previous studio album, Quick Step & Side Kick (1983).

Despite a mixed response from critics, Into the Gap became the band's most commercially successful studio album, peaking at number one on the UK Albums Chart (for three weeks), and number 10 on the US Billboard 200. "Hold Me Now", "Doctor! Doctor!", "You Take Me Up", and "Sister of Mercy" were all released as singles in the UK with corresponding music videos. Three of the four singles that were released in the UK made the Top 5 and the fourth just missed the Top 10. "The Gap" was also released as a single in some other countries, but no video was made for it. According to the RIAA, the record sold over one million copies in the US; in the UK the album sold over 600,000 copies and was certified 2× platinum. It became one of the year's biggest sellers, with five million copies sold worldwide. The band embarked on a world tour in support of the album.

In March 2008, Into the Gap was reissued as an expanded 2-disc set by Edsel Records. It included the bonus cassette remixes that originally appeared on the original cassette version of the album in 1984, and also features a second disc which includes most major 12" single versions and B-sides, some of which appear on CD for the first time. A triple CD 40th anniversary deluxe edition was released in November 2024, which includes some previously unreleased tracks.

== Critical reception ==
Professional ratings
Review scores
| Source | Rating |
|---|---|
| AllMusic | 4/5 stars |
| Encyclopedia of Popular Music | 3/5 stars |
| Rolling Stone | 3/5 stars |
| The Rolling Stone Album Guide | 3/5 stars |
| Smash Hits | 2½/10 |
| Sounds | 1/5 stars |
| The Village Voice | B− |

Writing in Smash Hits magazine, Dave Rimmer gave the album 2.5 out of 10, commenting that it contained "several songs with empty words and plodding tunes sung in a whiney voice and slung together with fake sentiment. The success of the terrible Twins represents the usual triumph of naked ambition over talent." In his consumer guide for The Village Voice, Robert Christgau admired the track "Hold Me Now", and gave the album a B−, but commented that "Nothing else here approaches its heart-tugging mastery, but the album remains lightly creditable through the title-cut chinoiserie which opens side two. After that, as Alannah Currie herself puts it, who can stop the rain?". Keith Sharp of Music Express wrote "Into The Gap could be perceived as a distinctive milestone on how far new music has come in the past few years. It's enough to make you forget that the old dinosaur bands ever existed." J. D. Considine of Musician wrote "At times, the gimmicks can be as slight as a synthesizer setting, but they invariable make the album seem dazzling even when it isn't." However, NME called them "1984's most instantly kitsch mass program of monosodium glutamation of the brain".

A more recent review from Jose F. Promis of AllMusic gave the album four out of five stars and wrote that "Nearly every song on this set differed from the others, with each track taking the listener on a different musical journey." adding that "[the] Thompson Twins were quiet visionaries, blending intelligent lyrics, Eastern sensibilities, and new wave pop to create a wholly unique and unforgettable listening experience and an album that ranks as one of the '80s' most unique."

== Track listing ==
All tracks are written by Tom Bailey, Alannah Currie, and Joe Leeway.

Side one
| No. | Title | Length |
|---|---|---|
| 1. | "Doctor! Doctor!" | 4:39 |
| 2. | "You Take Me Up" | 4:26 |
| 3. | "Day After Day" | 3:49 |
| 4. | "Sister of Mercy" | 5:09 |
| 5. | "No Peace for the Wicked" | 4:09 |

Side two
| No. | Title | Length |
|---|---|---|
| 6. | "The Gap" | 4:44 |
| 7. | "Hold Me Now" | 4:46 |
| 8. | "Storm on the Sea" | 5:26 |
| 9. | "Who Can Stop the Rain" | 5:46 |
| Total length: | | 42:33 |

Some pressings of the album (usually US) have a "non-smiling" cover variation, a different order and a shorter version of the final track

| No. | Title | Length |
|---|---|---|
| 1. | "Doctor! Doctor!" | 4:39 |
| 2. | "You Take Me Up" | 4:26 |
| 3. | "Hold Me Now" | 4:46 |
| 4. | "Day After Day" | 3:49 |
| 5. | "No Peace for the Wicked" | 4:09 |
| 6. | "The Gap" | 4:44 |
| 7. | "Sister of Mercy" | 5:09 |
| 8. | "Storm on the Sea" | 5:26 |
| 9. | "Who Can Stop the Rain" | 5:16 |
| Total length: | | 42:03 |

The UK cassette version of Into the Gap contained an additional side of remixes and B-sides, most of which were previously unreleased

| No. | Title | Length |
|---|---|---|
| 1. | "Leopard Ray (an original instrumental composition)" | 3:18 |
| 2. | "Doctor! Doctor! (extended version)" | 7:49 |
| 3. | "Panic Station (remix of Day After Day)" | 4:40 |
| 4. | "Down Tools (remix of You Take Me Up)" | 4:23 |
| 5. | "Hold Me Now (extended version)" | 9:45 |
| 6. | "Funeral Dance (remix of No Peace For The Wicked)" | 3:12 |
| 7. | "Compass Points (remix of The Gap)" | 5:00 |
| 8. | "Still Water (remix of Storm on the Sea)" | 5:40 |

2008 expanded edition

Disc 1
| No. | Title | Length |
|---|---|---|
| 1. | "Doctor! Doctor!" | 4:38 |
| 2. | "You Take Me Up" | 4:23 |
| 3. | "Day After Day" | 3:50 |
| 4. | "Sister of Mercy" | 5:04 |
| 5. | "No Peace for the Wicked" | 4:04 |
| 6. | "The Gap" | 4:43 |
| 7. | "Hold Me Now" | 4:42 |
| 8. | "Storm on the Sea" | 5:32 |
| 9. | "Who Can Stop the Rain" | 5:48 |
| 10. | "Leopard Ray (an original instrumental composition)" | 3:15 |
| 11. | "Doctor! Doctor! (extended version)" | 7:50 |
| 12. | "Panic Station (remix of Day After Day)" | 4:40 |
| 13. | "Down Tools (remix of You Take Me Up)" | 4:23 |
| 14. | "Hold Me Now (extended version)" | 9:45 |
| 15. | "Funeral Dance (remix of No Peace For The Wicked)" | 3:12 |

Disc 2
| No. | Title | Length |
|---|---|---|
| 1. | "Compass Points" | 5:00 |
| 2. | "Still Water" | 3:40 |
| 3. | "You Take Me Up (Machines Take Me Over)" (12" version of You Take Me Up) | 7:33 |
| 4. | "Sister of Mercy (12" Version)" (12" version of Sister of Mercy) | 9:26 |
| 5. | "Let Loving Start (12" Version)" (B-Side of Hold Me Now 12" single) | 9:09 |
| 6. | "You Take Me Up (High Plains Mixer)" (Originally released as a limited edition white label UK 12" single in Spring 1984) | 8:30 |
| 7. | "Nurse Shark" (B-Side of Doctor! Doctor! 7" and 12" singles) | 4:05 |
| 8. | "Passion Planet" (B-Side of You Take Me Up 7" single) | 3:42 |
| 9. | "You Take Me Up (Instrumental)" (B-Side of the High Plains Mixer UK 12" single of You Take Me Up) | 6:20 |
| 10. | "Out of the Gap (Megamix Extended Version)" (B-Side of Sister of Mercy 12" single, incorporating Love on Your Side, In the Name of Love, Tears, Doctor! Doctor!, We Are Detective, Lies, Hold Me Now, and The Gap) | 8:57 |

== Personnel ==
Thompson Twins

- Tom Bailey – vocals, synthesizers, pianos, guitars, bass guitar, double bass, melodica, harmonica, drum programming
- Joe Leeway – synthesizers, congas, backing vocals
- Alannah Currie – acoustic drums, percussion, marimba, xylophone, backing vocals

Additional musicians

- Pandit Dinesh – tablas on "The Gap"

== Production ==
- Tom Bailey – producer
- Alex Sadkin – producer, engineer
- Phil Thornalley – recording, mixing
- Chris Dickie – assistant engineer
- Frank Gibson – assistant engineer
- Steve Dewey – assistant engineer
- Ted Jensen – mastering
- Alannah Currie – art direction
- Nick Marchant – art direction
- Satari Graphic – design
- Paul Cox – front cover photography
- Peter Ashworth – inside photography

Studios

- Recorded at Compass Point Studios (Nassau, Bahamas).
- Mixed at RAK Studios (London, UK).
- Mastered at Sterling Sound (New York City, New York, US).

== Charts ==
=== Weekly charts ===
Weekly chart performance for Into the Gap
| Chart (1984) | Peak position |
|---|---|
| Australian Albums (Kent Music Report) | 4 |
| Canada Top Albums/CDs (RPM) | 3 |
| Dutch Albums (Album Top 100) | 23 |
| European Albums (Eurotipsheet) | 8 |
| Finnish Albums (Suomen virallinen lista) | 21 |
| German Albums (Offizielle Top 100) | 6 |
| Italian Albums (Musica e dischi) | 22 |
| New Zealand Albums (RMNZ) | 1 |
| Norwegian Albums (VG-lista) | 16 |
| Swedish Albums (Sverigetopplistan) | 14 |
| Swiss Albums (Schweizer Hitparade) | 7 |
| UK Albums (Official Charts) | 1 |
| US Billboard 200 | 10 |

=== Year-end charts ===
Year-end chart performance for Into the Gap
| Chart (1984) | Position |
|---|---|
| Australian Albums (Kent Music Report) | 26 |
| Canada Top Albums/CDs (RPM) | 14 |
| German Albums (Offizielle Top 100) | 30 |
| New Zealand Albums (RMNZ) | 12 |
| UK Albums (Gallup) | 12 |
| US Billboard 200 | 37 |

== Certifications ==
Certifications for Into the Gap
| Region | Certification | Certified units/sales |
|---|---|---|
| Canada (Music Canada) | 2× Platinum | 200,000^{^} |
| New Zealand (RMNZ) | Platinum | 15,000^{^} |
| United Kingdom (BPI) | 2× Platinum | 600,000^{^} |
| United States (RIAA) | Platinum | 1,000,000^{^} |
^{^} Shipments figures based on certification alone.
