= The Stone (Babble album) =

Studio album by Babble
- Released: March 8, 1994
- Length: 51:27
- Label: Reprise/Warner Bros. Records; 45387
- Producer: Tom Bailey; Alannah Currie; Keith Fernley

Babble chronology
The Stone (1994)	Ether (1996)

The Stone is the debut studio album by Babble, an electronic dance music group that was composed of Tom Bailey, Alannah Currie (formerly of the Thompson Twins), and Keith Fernley. The group changed its name as it changed the outward appearance of its sound, from pop to dub-influenced chill-out. The underlying melodies and the familiar voices of Bailey and Currie still gave a Thompson Twins tone. However, the addition of Quest vocalist Amey St. Cyr ("Take Me Away" and "Tribe"), emcee Q-Tee ("Beautiful"), deep basslines, and loads of spacious effects made it a much more relevant album for the lounge music scene. Promotion of the album was minimal. However, during an interview in Classic Pop magazine in 2014, Bailey stated the album was influential in the recording of Original Soundtracks 1, an album released in 1995 by U2 and Brian Eno under the pseudonym Passengers.

== Critical reception ==
Professional ratings
Review scores
Source	Rating
AllMusic	2/5 stars
Music Week	3/5 stars

William Ruhlmann of AllMusic considered the album to "sound a lot like a Thompson Twins record, especially when Tom Bailey is singing." He added: "The group has brought in some ambient sounds, borrowed some cheesy Indian restaurant music, and stolen the main riff from "I Am the Walrus." These are not improvements. By whatever name they choose, Bailey and Currie have not returned to form."

== Track listing ==
1. "The Downward Pull of Heaven's Force" - 1:38
2. "Tribe" - 5:49
3. "You Kill Me" - 6:13
4. "Spirit" - 6:51
5. "Take Me Away" - 6:42
6. "The Stone" - 3:31
7. "Beautiful" - 6:22
8. "Space" - 5:50
9. "Sunray Dub" - 2:23
10. "Drive" - 6:03
