= Dieter Trattmann =

American film director

- Born: Dieter Ewald Trattmann; Switzerland
- Occupations: Director; producer; editor; real estate investor

Dieter Trattmann (b. Switzerland) is a director/editor and producer who resides in California.

== Life and career ==
Dieter Trattmann was born and raised in Switzerland. In the late 1970s, he became fascinated with music and film and moved to London where he attended the London Film School. In 1983, he went to work for MGMM Productions in London, beginning his career in film by directing a commercial for MTV. In 1986, he moved to EMI/Picture Music International, where he continued his film career, specializing in music videos during the 1980s and 1990s and directing work for Donna Summer, the Thompson Twins, Cliff Richard and Placido Domingo. He worked on contracts with EMI/Capitol, Polygram, Island, Atlantic, Arista, Virgin, Chrysalis, RCA, Geffen, Sony and others.

In 1989, he moved to Los Angeles where he signed with the A&R Group as a director. He worked for CBS on a number of hit shows including CSI. In 2004, Trattmann went to work for Lifestyle/Fashion TV as Senior Editor. In 2015, he was credited as a producer for the film Como você quer o seu casamento?. Over the span of his career, Trattmann has directed and edited over 200 commercials, music videos and live concerts, plus worked on a number of films and TV series shows. Trattmann currently lives in Los Angeles, where he is also involved in real estate investment.

== Awards ==
- 2003 - The Academy of Television Arts & Sciences honor for contribution to the 30th Daytime Emmy Awards
- 1985 - UK Music Video Awards for Best Live Concert, Thompson Twins - "Into the Gap Live" (director)
- 1987 - German Music Awards, Best Director for Cliff Richard - "My Pretty One"
- 1989 - Montreux Pop Festival - Best International Video for Climie Fisher - "Rise to the Occasion"
