= Tom Bailey (musician) =

British musician (born 1954)

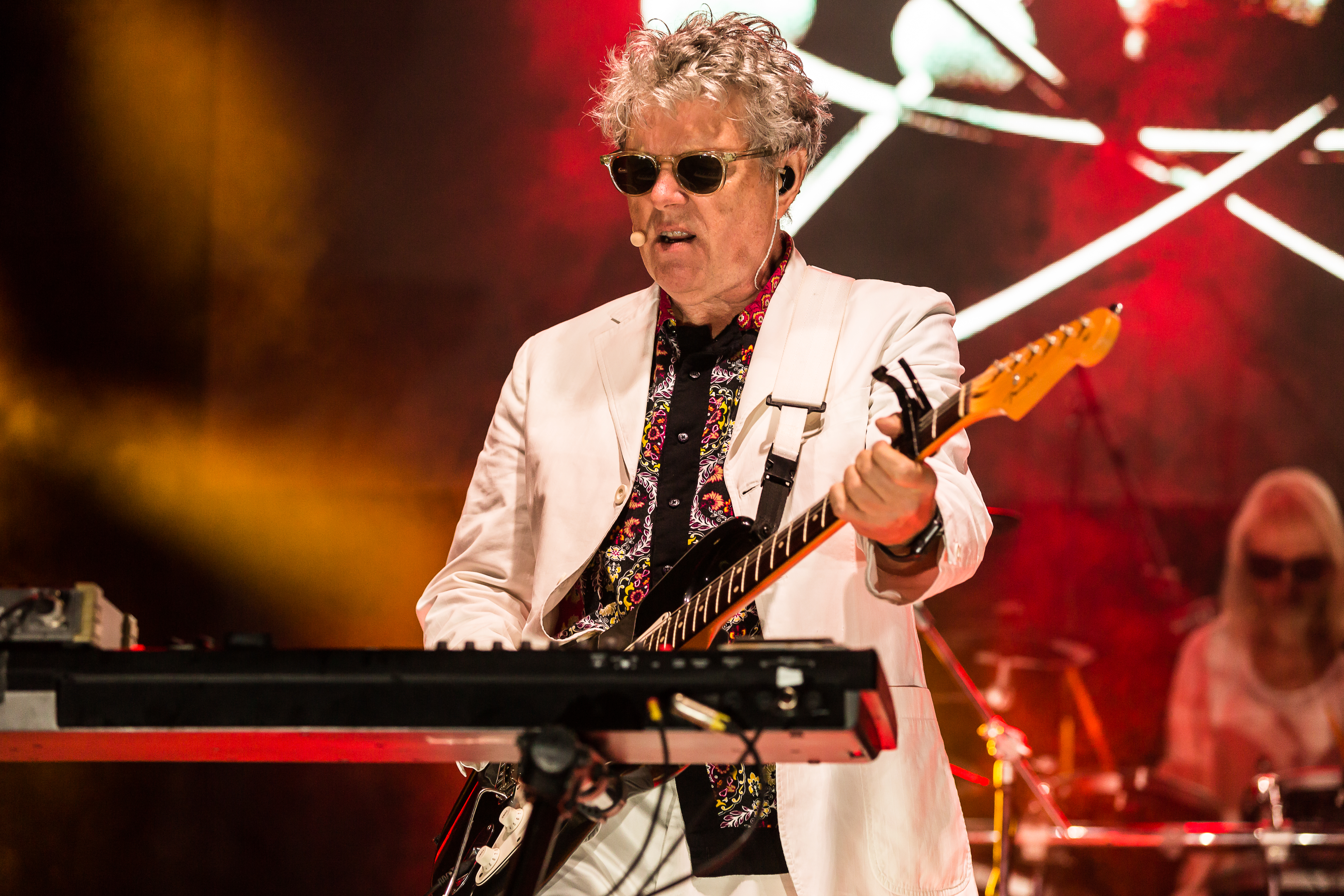
- Bailey performing live on the Nocturnal Culture Night festival in 2023

Background information
- Born: Thomas Alexander Bailey; 18 January 1954 (age 72); Halifax, West Riding of Yorkshire, England
- Origin: Chesterfield, Derbyshire, England
- Genres: New wave; pop
- Occupations: Singer; songwriter; musician; composer; record producer
- Instruments: Vocals; keyboards; guitar; bass guitar; double bass; harmonica; percussion
- Years active: 1975–present
- Labels: Arista; Warner Bros.
- Formerly of: Thompson Twins; Babble; International Observer; Bailey-Salgado Project
- Website: thompsontwinstombailey.co.uk

Thomas Alexander Bailey (born 18 January 1954) is an English singer, songwriter, musician, composer and record producer.

Bailey came to prominence in the early 1980s as the lead vocalist for the new wave band Thompson Twins, which released five singles that entered the top ten charts in the United Kingdom during the 1980s: "Love On Your Side", "We Are Detective", "Hold Me Now", "Doctor! Doctor!", and "You Take Me Up". He was the only member of the band to have formal musical training. From 1994, Bailey was also a member of its later incarnation, Babble, releasing two studio albums. He released his debut solo studio album Science Fiction in 2018.

Bailey currently works in various musical fields including scoring for film. He records and performs dub music under the name International Observer and Indo-fusion music with the Holiwater Project. He also collaborated with astronomer and visual artist José Francisco Salgado as part of the audio-visual ensemble Bailey-Salgado Project (BSP).

== Early life and education ==
Tom Bailey grew up in a family associated with the medical profession. His father was the Medical Officer of Health for Chesterfield Borough Council, and Bailey was educated at Chesterfield Grammar School. After training as a classical pianist, Bailey initially worked as a music teacher at Brook School, Sheffield.

== Musical career ==
=== 1977–1993: Thompson Twins ===
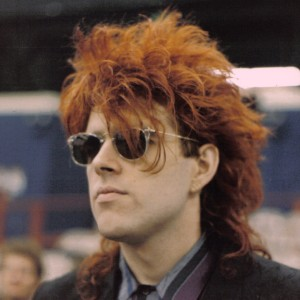
Bailey in San Bernardino, California, 1986

Bailey formed Thompson Twins in 1977 with Pete Dodd (guitar and vocals), John Roog (guitar), and Jon Podgorski (drums). Podgorski did not want to move to London, so Andrew Edge played drums with them for one year before Chris Bell joined. The group eventually ended up as a trio with Bailey on lead vocals, guitar, bass, and keyboards, his then girlfriend Alannah Currie (percussion, saxophone, and backing vocals), and Joe Leeway (percussion and vocals). Thompson Twins became fixtures on MTV during the 1980s as the videos for "Hold Me Now", "Lay Your Hands on Me" and "King for a Day" were played frequently. Subsequent to the marriage of Bailey and Currie, Thompson Twins released their final studio album, Queer, in 1991.

=== 1993–1996: Babble ===
In 1994, Bailey and Currie formed the electronica-orientated duo, Babble.

=== 2000s: International Observer ===
Between 2001 and 2015, Bailey released several dub and electronica albums under the name International Observer.

=== 2010s: Tom Bailey solo ===
Bailey performed Thompson Twins songs live for the first time in 27 years on 14 August 2014 at Sub89, Reading. This served as a low-key warm up for 17 August 2014 where he performed to Temple Island Meadows, Henley-on-Thames, Oxfordshire for the Rewind Festival.

Also in 2014, Bailey took part in the Retro Futura Tour in the US. He was billed under the moniker "Thompson Twins' Tom Bailey." The 2014 Retro Futura Tour also featured Howard Jones, Midge Ure, China Crisis, and Katrina Leskanich of Katrina and the Waves. During an interview with the Stuck in the '80s podcast prior to the tour, Bailey said that while preparing for his return to the stage he went to a store and bought a Thompson Twins greatest-hits CD to help him learn the songs again.

In 2016, Bailey released a new solo single titled "Come So Far", which included a music video.

On 25 April 2017, the official Thompson Twins' Tom Bailey website announced that Bailey was recording his debut solo studio album and that he hoped to release the album in early 2018. The album, titled Science Fiction, was released in July 2018. To promote the album, Bailey toured the United States and United Kingdom with the B-52's, Culture Club, and Belinda Carlisle as part of The Life Tour.

=== 2022–2024: Into the Gap Tour ===
In September and October 2022, Bailey performed the Thompson Twins' studio album Into the Gap in its entirety first in Aylesbury, England and then in Australia, (along with his band known as "The Sisters of Mercy"), having recently moved back to New Zealand full time from his home in London.

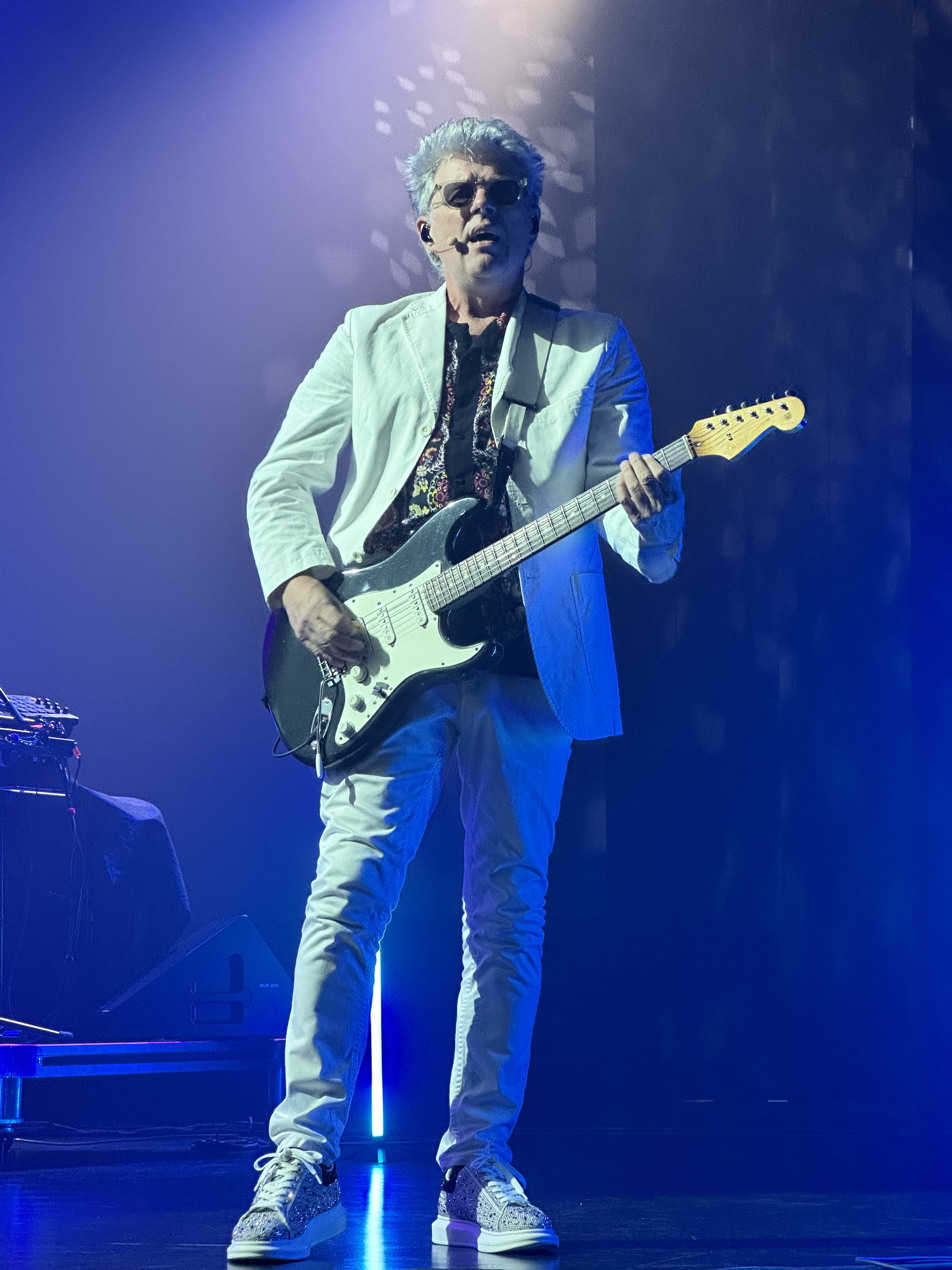
Bailey performing during the Totally Tubular Festival in Toronto, 2024

In May 2024, Bailey toured the UK to celebrate 40 years of the album Into The Gap and toured in the U.S. with the Totally Tubular Festival.

=== Musical collaborations ===
In 1983, Bailey played keyboards and percussion on Paul Haig's debut studio album Rhythm of Life.

Bailey also played keyboards on Foreigner's 1984 hit "I Want to Know What Love Is".

In 1988, Bailey collaborated with Phil Thornalley, who worked frequently with Thompson Twins, on Thornalley's only solo studio album, Swamp. Aside from playing instruments, Bailey also produced three tracks, remixed three tracks along with Thornalley and co-wrote the track "When I Get to Heaven".

In 1999, Bailey produced the New Zealand band Stellar, and in 1999 he won Record Producer of the Year in New Zealand for their debut studio album, Mix.

In 2002, Bailey became the figurehead for the dub project International Observer. Recent performances with 'Holiwater', a cinematic fusion of Indian classical music (Sarod- Vikash Maharaj), electronica (keyboards – Bailey) and video (film maker – Andrei Jewell), explores the intersection between art installation and performance. The band was formed to highlight issues of water pollution on the Ganges.

In 2010, Bailey and astronomer and visual artist José Francisco Salgado formed an audiovisual ensemble called Bailey-Salgado Project (BSP). BSP combines music with photography, video, and motion graphics to create multimedia works that have as subject the physical world. Their first work together, a short film entitled Sidereal Motion, was previewed in Bath, England in October 2010.

== Personal life ==
Bailey was married to Thompson Twins member Alannah Currie from 1991 to 2003. They have two children. As of 2014, Bailey lived in France with his second wife, artist Lauren Drescher. He has homes in New Zealand, France, and London. Bailey is a vegan and has said he does not drink alcohol or use recreational drugs.

== Discography ==
Solo

- Science Fiction (2018), UK#166 SCO#68

with Thompson Twins

- A Product Of... (Participation) (1981)
- Set (1982)
- Quick Step and Side Kick (1983)
- Into the Gap (1984)
- Here's to Future Days (1985)
- Close to the Bone (1987)
- Big Trash (1989)
- Queer (1991)

with Babble

- The Stone (1994)
- Ether (1996)

Compilation Album contributions

- Red Hot + Blue (1990)

Soundtrack contributions

- Songs from the Cool World (1992)

== Gallery ==
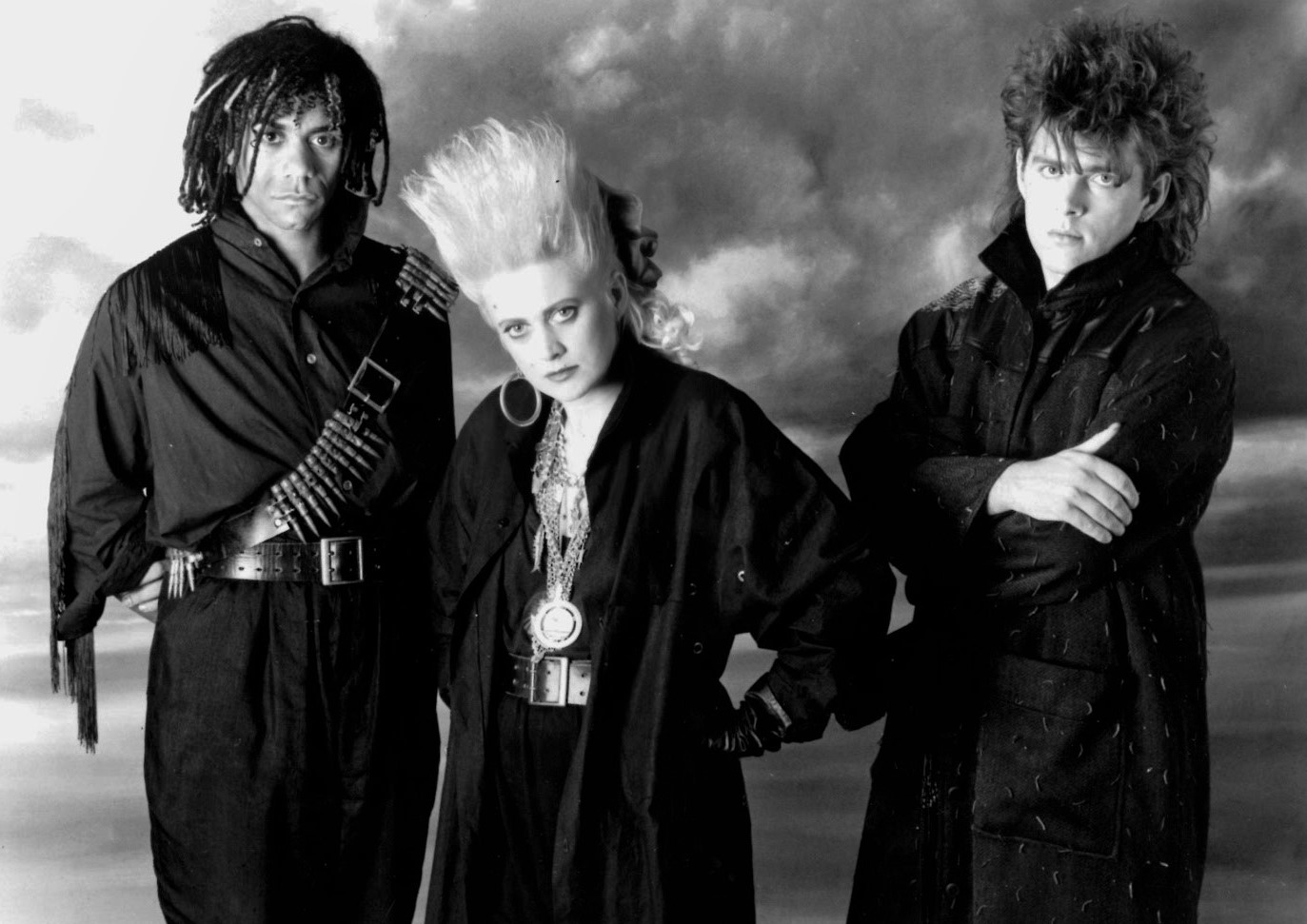
Bailey (right) as member of the Thompson Twins, 1985

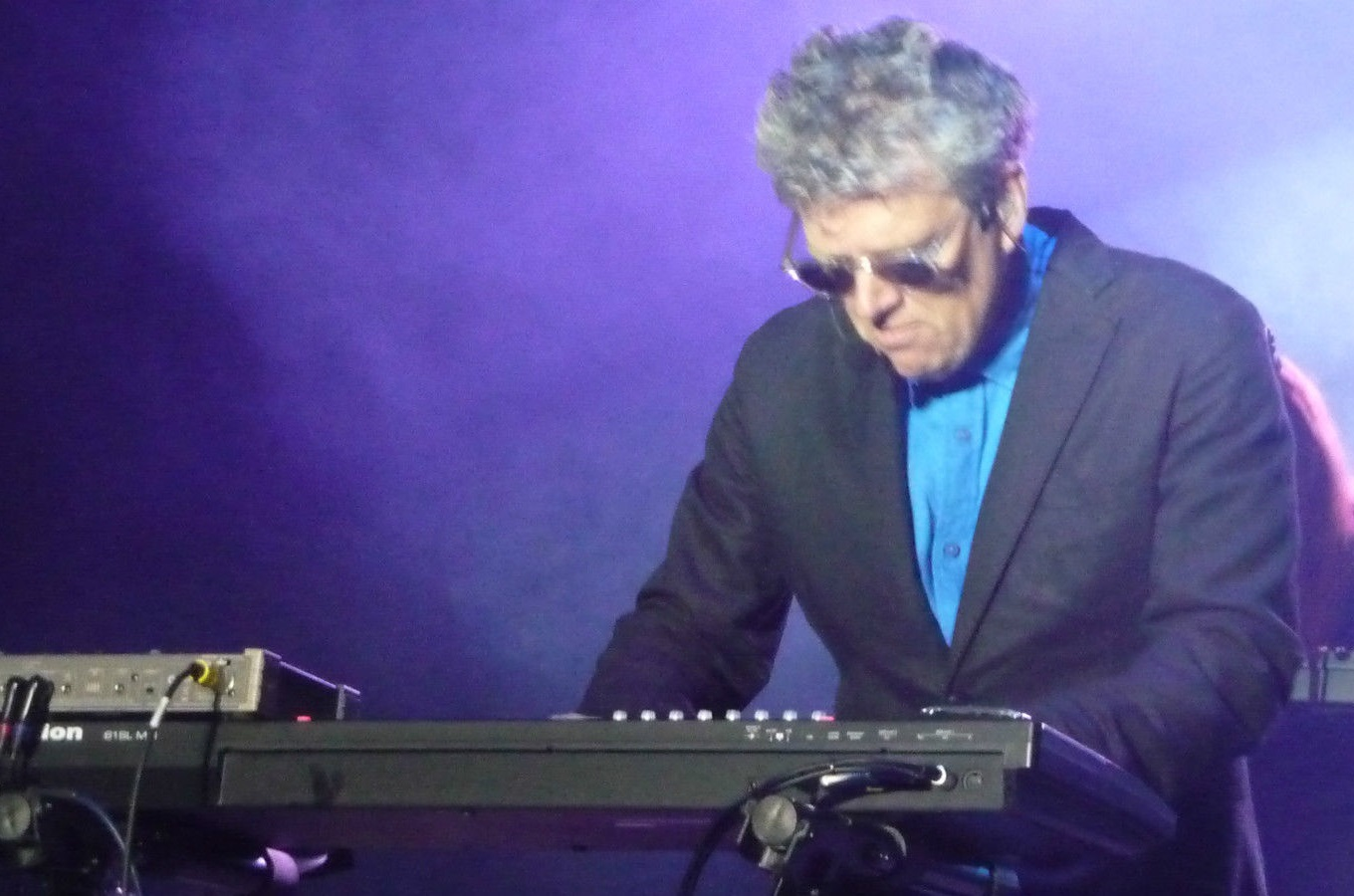
Bailey playing keyboards, 2015

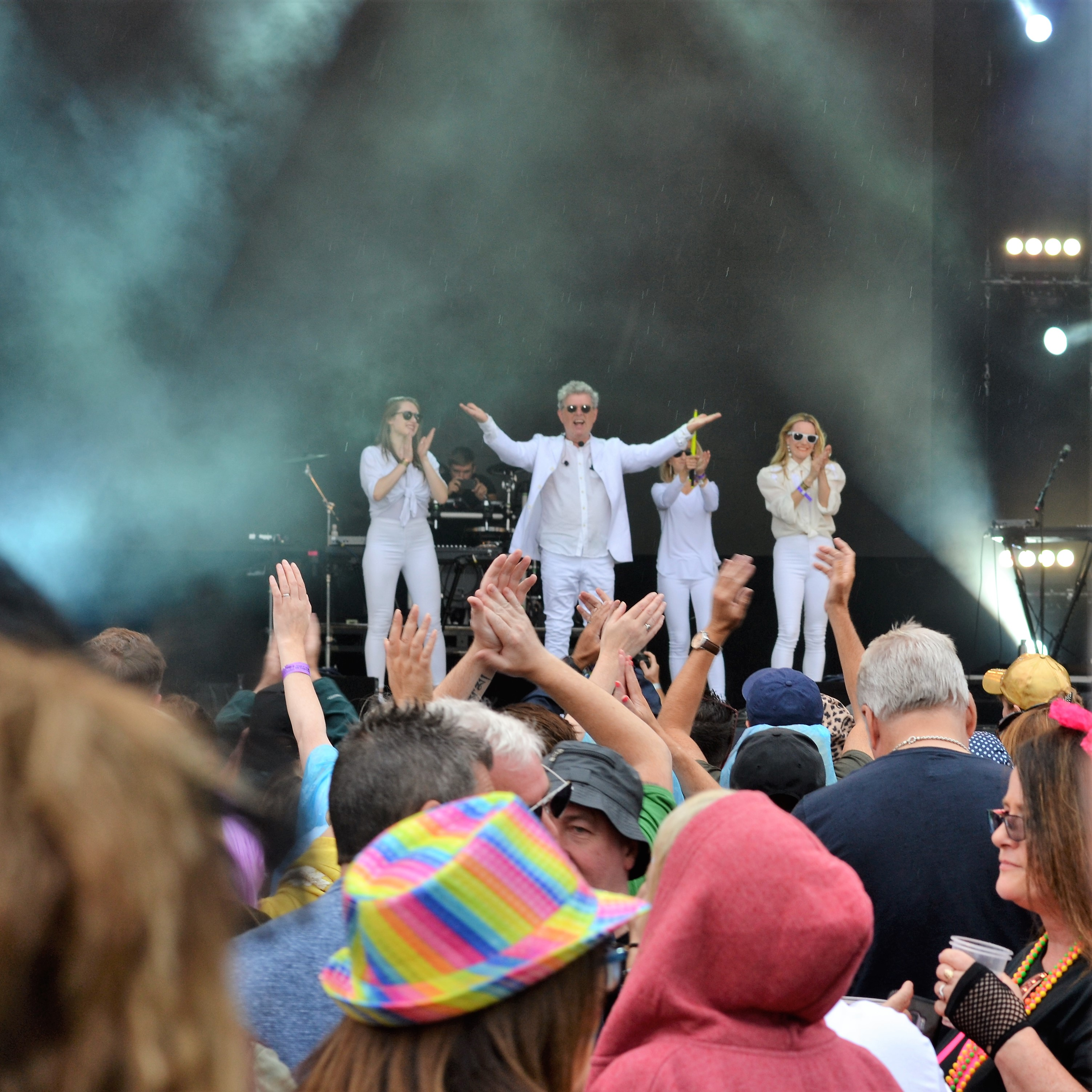
Bailey performing in Belfast, with his band members "The Sisters of Mercy" 2019

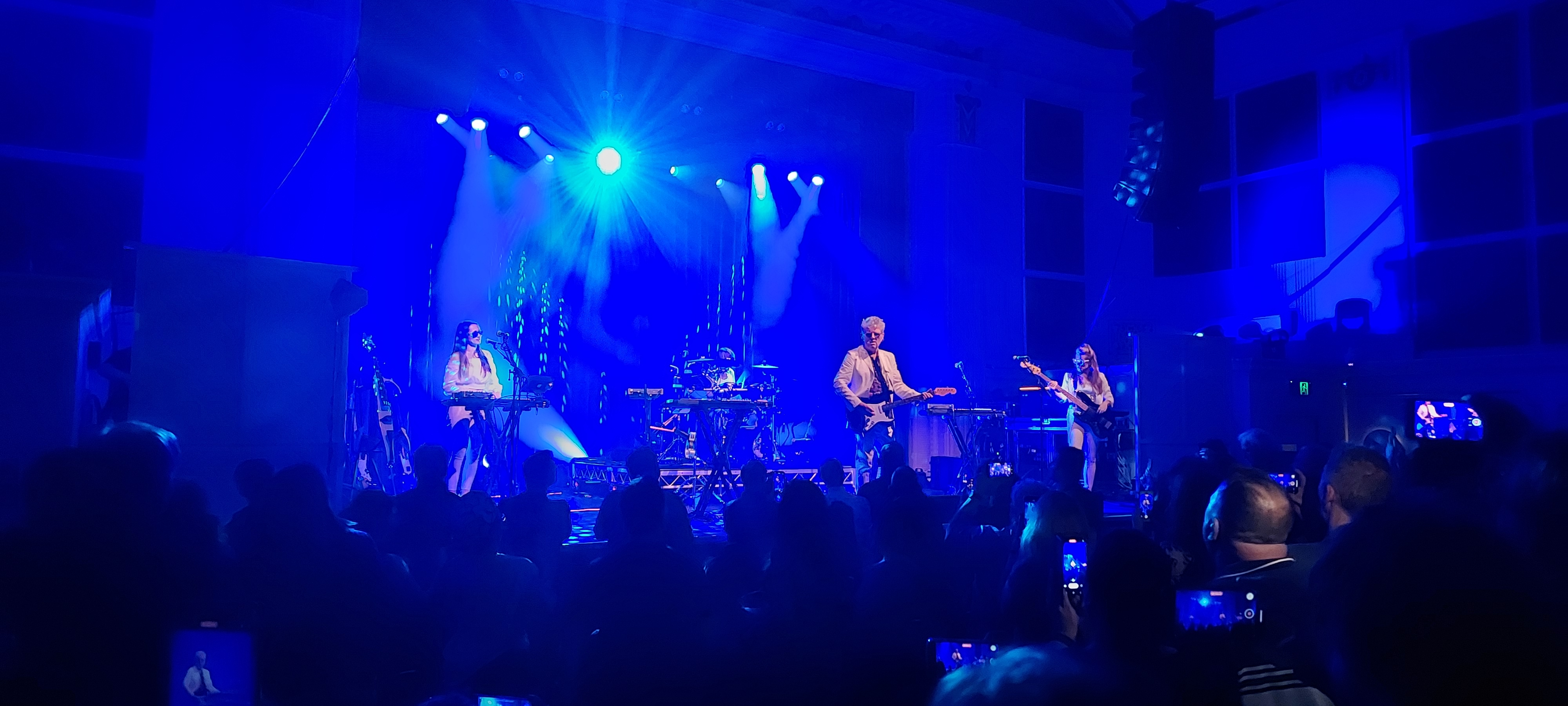
Bailey performing "Hold Me Now" at Northcote Theatre, 2022
