= Alannah Currie =

New Zealand musician

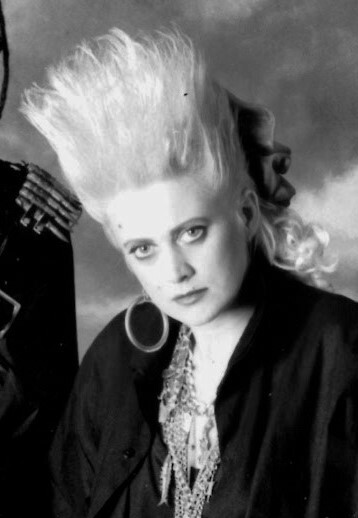
- Currie c. 1985

Background information
- Born: Alannah Joy Currie; 20 September 1957 (age 69)
- Origin: Auckland, New Zealand
- Genres: Pop; rock; dance; new wave; synth-pop
- Occupations: Singer-songwriter; artist; designer
- Instruments: Saxophone; keyboards; drums; percussion; vocals
- Years active: 1979–1997
- Labels: Arista; Warner Bros.
- Formerly of: Thompson Twins; Babble

Alannah Joy Currie (born 20 September 1957) is a New Zealand artist based in London. She is a musician and activist, best known as a former member of the pop band Thompson Twins.

== Career ==
Born in New Zealand and trained as a journalist, Currie emigrated to the UK in 1977. Currie squatted in South London. She formed a band the Unfuckables that performed a single gig.

In 1981, Currie joined Tom Bailey, Joe Leeway, and others to form part of Thompson Twins, the line-up of which included up to seven members in its early days. Thompson Twins became a trio in 1982 and signed two major recording contracts with Arista Records before signing with Warner Bros. Records. Currie was a lyricist, percussionist, visual stylist, and backing vocalist in the band for 15 years.

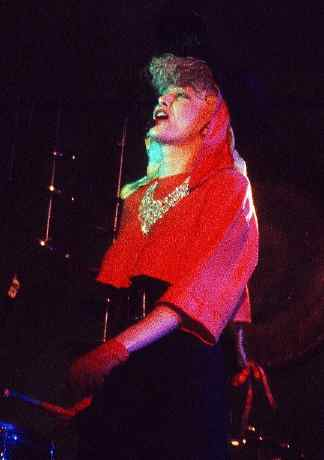
Currie performing with Thompson Twins in Bristol, 1984

She co-wrote and recorded six studio albums which included gold and platinum records and the hits "Doctor! Doctor!", "Hold Me Now", and "You Take Me Up". The band performed at the JFK Stadium, Philadelphia for the 1985 Live Aid concert and worked with artists including Nile Rodgers, Madonna, Grace Jones, Alex Sadkin, Matthew Seligman and Jerry Harrison of Talking Heads amongst others. Her songwriting credits also include "I Want That Man", an international hit for Deborah Harry in 1989.

In 1984 the band participated in the "first international satellite installation" by Nam June Paik, "Good Morning, Mr. Orwell".

By 1992, Currie and her then husband, fellow Thompson Twins band member Tom Bailey, elected to form Babble, featuring Currie as lyricist, percussionist and visual artist, as a means of creating music without the commercial expectations that were placed on Thompson Twins. In 1994 Babble released their debut studio album, The Stone. Currie later returned to New Zealand working primarily as a glass artist and environmental activist. She was the founder of the women's anti-genetic engineering movement Mothers Against Genetic Engineering in Food and the Environment (MAdGE). In 2003 she designed a series of protest billboards that caused controversy in New Zealand and won several international art and science awards.

In 2004 she returned to London where she works under the name Miss Pokeno and makes art that fuses "joyful dissent" with disruptive and uncomfortable narratives. Her practice plays on the boundary between the humorous and threatening, as with the (semi-) mythological militant feminists The Sisters of Perpetual Resistance and the Armchair Destructivists. She has a studio in London called Doyce Street Studios Projects.

In 2022, her artwork was shown in London in a group show, Five Needle Five Wire, curated by Roxana Halls and Wendy Elia. Other artists included Sarah Maple, Adelaide Damoah, Wendy Elia, Roxana Halls, Rebecca Fontaine-Wolf, Marie-Anne Mancio, Annie Attridge, Carmen and Luisa, Vicki DaSilva, Farrah Riley Gray, Fiona Robinson, Tina True, Julie Umerle, Jessica Voorsanger and Chloe Wing.
