= Joe Leeway =

British musician, songwriter (born 1955)

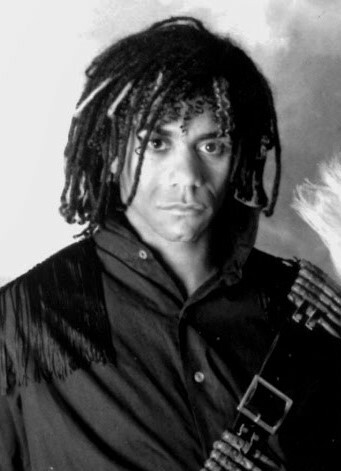
- Leeway c. 1985

Background information
- Born: Joseph Martin Leeway; 15 November 1955 (age 70)
- Origin: Islington, London, England
- Genres: Pop; rock; dance; new wave; synth-pop
- Occupations: Musician; songwriter
- Instruments: Keyboards; congas; drums; vocals
- Years active: 1980–1989
- Label: Arista
- Formerly of: Thompson Twins

Joseph Martin Leeway (born 15 November 1955) is a British musician and songwriter, who is best known as being a member of the pop band Thompson Twins, joining the band in 1981 after being one of their roadies.

== Early life ==
Joseph Martin Leeway was born on 15 November 1955 to an Irish mother and Nigerian father, and from the age of two, was fostered by an English family in Dartford, Kent. He grew up mostly in Manchester, in the North West of England. At college he studied English and Drama, then began teaching English, which is how he met Tom Bailey. He joined a theatre group in Cardiff after failing to establish his own company. He spent a year with the Young Vic theatre before working with Thompson Twins as a roadie at Bailey's invitation.

== Thompson Twins ==
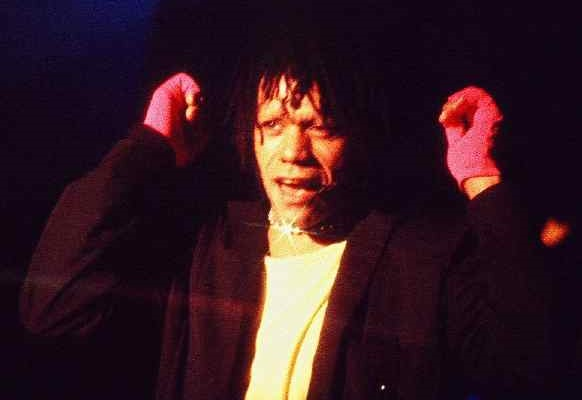
Leeway performing with Thompson Twins in 1984

Playing bongos and congas, he appeared on Thompson Twins debut studio album A Product Of... (Participation) (1981). By the time the band recorded their second studio album Set in 1982, Leeway had begun contributing to the songwriting process; he wrote by himself two songs for the album, and sang lead vocals on three tracks.

At that time in 1982, the Thompson Twins' membership changed radically. They had been at the time of Set an ever-changing group of musicians, featuring seven members; band leader Tom Bailey then reduced the band to a trio by firing everybody except Alannah Currie and Leeway. Leeway's main role in the new line-up was to assist in writing the songs, contribute backing vocals and design the group's stage shows due to Leeway's background in theatre.

Thompson Twins enjoyed at least three solid years of worldwide commercial success, beginning with the 1983 studio album Quick Step & Side Kick (released in the US as simply Side Kicks) followed by Into the Gap in 1984, and Here's to Future Days in 1985.

After these three studio albums, their recording contract with Arista Records was up for renewal and after the extensive world tour following the release of the latter album, Leeway chose to leave the band for a number of personal reasons, mostly due to difficulties with Bailey, Currie, & the group's management.

== Solo work and career change ==
After leaving the band, Leeway dabbled in solo work. He recorded a demo tape of original material, but ultimately an album never materialised. He appeared in the 1989 James Ivory film Slaves of New York as musician Johnny Jalouse. Leeway's part in the film was originally a prominent supporting character, but this was changed when most of his scenes were cut. The actress with whom he had filmed most of his scenes was fired from the film, and their scenes together were cut. Leeway can still be seen in the film singing one of his original songs, "Mother Dearest", in the nightclub scene; the recording is not on the soundtrack album.

The experience with Slaves of New York seemed to stall Leeway's career as an actor permanently, but he continued to work in sound design for films as well as commercials for Nike and Pepsi.

As of 2026, Leeway resided in Los Angeles, and worked in the field of hypnotherapy. He was on the staff at the Hypnosis Motivation Institute (HMI) in Tarzana, Los Angeles, and was also a certified trainer in neuro-linguistic programming.
