= Thompson Twins discography =

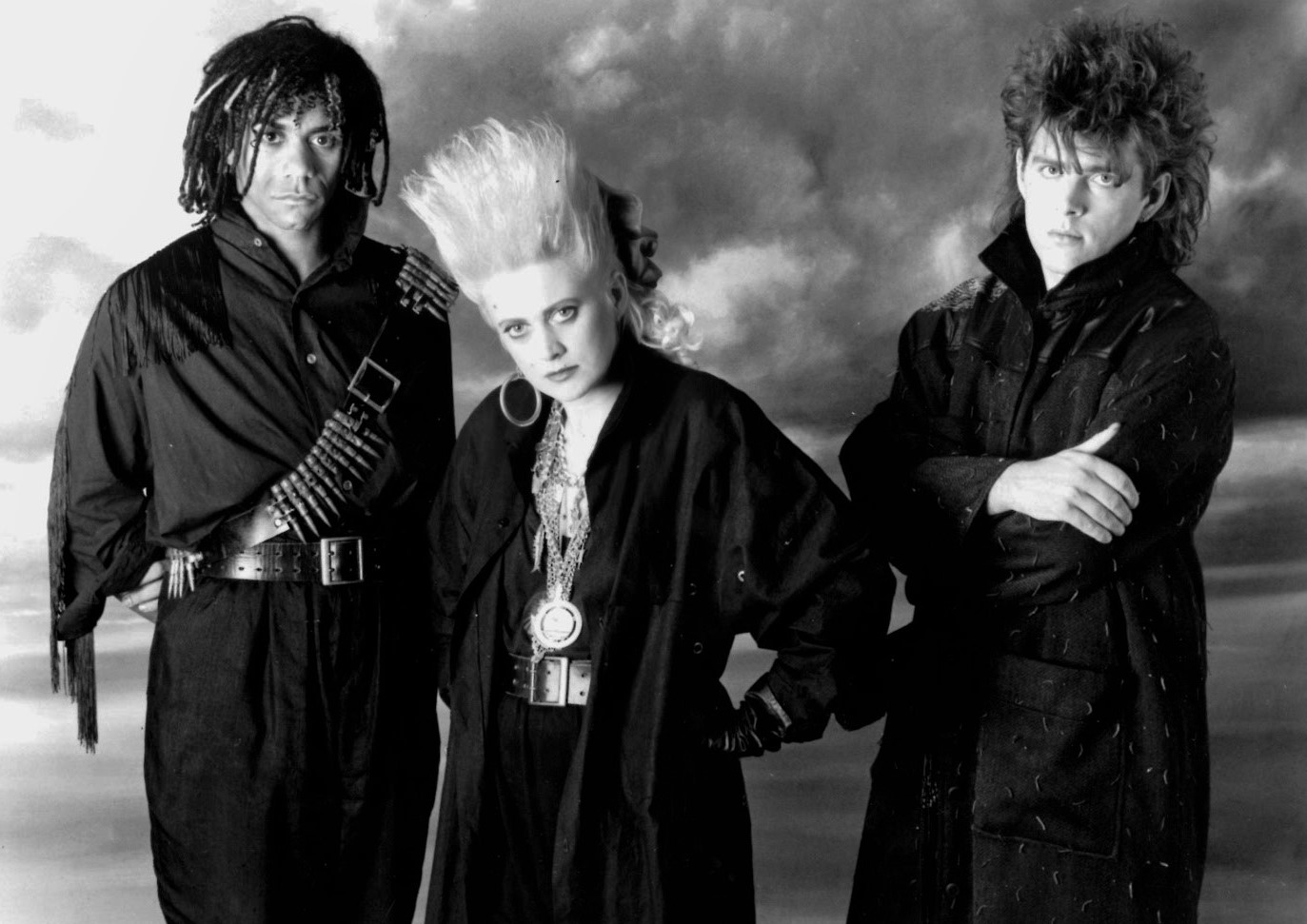
- Thompson Twins in 1985, left to right: Joe Leeway, Alannah Currie and Tom Bailey.
- Studio albums: 8
- Live albums: 1
- Compilation albums: 15
- Singles: 35
- Video albums: 3
- Music videos: 20

The following is the complete discography of English pop band Thompson Twins.

== Albums ==
=== Studio albums ===
| Title | Details | Peak chart positions | | | | | | | | | | Certifications (sales threshold) |
| Title | Details | UK | AUS | CAN | GER | NL | NZ | NOR | SWE | SWI | US | Certifications (sales threshold) |
|---|---|---|---|---|---|---|---|---|---|---|---|---|
| A Product Of... (Participation) | Release date: June 1981; Label: T; Formats: Vinyl LP, cassette | — | — | — | — | — | — | — | — | — | — | |
| Set | Release date: 26 February 1982; Label: Arista; Formats: LP, cassette | 48 | — | — | — | — | — | — | — | — | — | |
| Quick Step & Side Kick Side Kicks (US) | Release date: January 1983 (UK) February 1983 (US); Label: Arista; Formats: LP, cassette | 2 | 85 | 26 | — | 47 | 7 | — | 27 | — | 34 | BPI: Platinum; RMNZ: Gold |
| Into the Gap | Release date: 17 February 1984; Label: Arista; Formats: LP, cassette | 1 | 4 | 3 | 6 | 23 | 1 | 16 | 14 | 7 | 10 | BPI: 2× Platinum; MC: 2× Platinum; RIAA: Platinum; RMNZ: Platinum |
| Here's to Future Days | Release date: 17 September 1985; Label: Arista; Formats: LP, cassette | 5 | 8 | 14 | 42 | 42 | 1 | 9 | 7 | 12 | 20 | BPI: Gold; MC: Platinum; RIAA: Gold; RMNZ: Platinum |
| Close to the Bone | Release date: 30 March 1987; Label: Arista; Formats: LP, cassette | 90 | — | 71 | — | — | 46 | 20 | 26 | — | 76 | |
| Big Trash | Release date: 26 September 1989; Label: Warner Bros.; Formats: LP, cassette | — | — | — | — | — | — | — | — | — | 143 | |
| Queer | Release date: 24 September 1991; Label: Warner Bros.; Formats: CD, cassette | — | 193 | — | — | — | — | — | — | — | — | |
"—" denotes a recording that did not chart or was not released in that territory.

=== Live albums ===
| Title | Details |
|---|---|
| Into the Gap Live | Release date: 12 April 2025 (vinyl) 18 April 2025 (digital); Label: BMG; Formats: vinyl, digital |

=== Compilation albums ===
| Title | Details | Peak chart positions | | Certifications (sales threshold) |
| Title | Details | UK | US | Certifications (sales threshold) |
|---|---|---|---|---|
| In the Name of Love (U.S.) | Release date: June 1982; Label: Arista; Formats: LP, cassette | — | 148 | |
| The Best of Thompson Twins: Greatest Mixes | Release date: 1988; Label: Arista; Formats: LP, cassette | — | 175 | |
| Thompson Twins Greatest Hits | Release date: 1990; Label: Stylus Music; Formats: LP, cassette, CD | 23 | — | BPI: Silver |
| The Greatest Hits | Release date: 7 April 2003; Label: BMG; Formats: CD | — | — | BPI: Silver |
"—" denotes a recording that did not chart or was not released in that territory.

The following compilations were released in various territories but did not chart:

- The Best of Thompson Twins (1991)
- The Collection (1993)
- Singles Collection (1996)
- Greatest Hits (1996)
- The Best of Thompson Twins (1998)
- Master Hits (1999)
- Hold Me Now (2000)
- Platinum & Gold Collection (2003)
- The Greatest Hits (2003)
- 12 Inch Collection (2004)
- Love on Your Side – The Best of Thompson Twins (2007)
- Remixes & Rarities (2014)

== Singles ==
| Year | Title | Peak chart positions | | | | | | | | | | Certifications (sales threshold) | Album |
| Year | Title | UK | AUS | CAN | GER | NL | NZ | SWE | SWI | US | US Dan | Certifications (sales threshold) | Album |
|---|---|---|---|---|---|---|---|---|---|---|---|---|---|
| 1980 | "Squares and Triangles" (Note: "Squares and Triangles" was released on its own independent label, Dirty Discs in April 1980, and was re-released as a free single with the album Set on 26 February 1982.) | — | — | — | — | — | — | — | — | — | — | | single only |
| 1980 | "She's in Love with Mystery" (Note: "She's in Love with Mystery" was released in November 1980 through independent label Latent.) | — | — | — | — | — | — | — | — | — | — | | single only |
| 1981 | "Perfect Game" | — | — | — | — | — | — | — | — | — | — | | A Product Of... (Participation) |
| 1981 | "Animal Laugh" | — | — | — | — | — | — | — | — | — | — | | A Product Of... (Participation) |
| 1981 | "Make Believe" | — | — | — | — | — | — | — | — | — | — | | A Product Of... (Participation) |
| 1981 | "Politics" | — | — | — | — | — | — | — | — | — | — | | A Product Of... (Participation) |
| 1982 | "In the Name of Love" | — (Note: "In the Name of Love" did not enter the UK Singles Chart, but did reach number 90 on the Record Business Top 100 Singles chart.) | — | — | — | 44 | — | — | — | — | 1 | | Set; In the Name of Love (U.S.) |
| 1982 | "Runaway" | — (Note: This single did not enter the UK Singles Chart, but did reach number 83 on the Record Business Top 100 Singles chart.) | — | — | — | — | — | — | — | — | — | | Set; In the Name of Love (U.S.) |
| 1982 | "Lies" | 67 | 27 | 12 | — | — | 6 | — | — | 30 | 1 | | Quick Step and Side Kick; Side Kicks (U.S.) |
| 1983 | "Love on Your Side" | 9 | 80 | 47 | 32 | 27 | 9 | — | — | 45 | 6 | | Quick Step and Side Kick; Side Kicks (U.S.) |
| 1983 | "We Are Detective" | 7 | — | — | — | — | 48 | — | — | — | — | | Quick Step and Side Kick; Side Kicks (U.S.) |
| 1983 | "Watching" | 33 | — | — | — | — | — | — | — | — | — | | Quick Step and Side Kick; Side Kicks (U.S.) |
| 1983 | "Hold Me Now" | 4 | 3 | 3 | 7 | — | 4 | — | 18 | 3 | 1 | BPI: Gold; MC: Gold | Into the Gap |
| 1984 | "Doctor! Doctor!" | 3 | 14 | 11 | 11 | 23 | 12 | — | 11 | 11 | 18 | BPI: Silver | Into the Gap |
| 1984 | "You Take Me Up" | 2 | 47 | 28 | 24 | 50 | 24 | — | — | 44 | — | BPI: Silver | Into the Gap |
| 1984 | "Sister of Mercy" | 11 | — | — | — | — | — | — | — | — | — | | Into the Gap |
| 1984 | "The Gap" | — | — | — | 62 | — | — | — | — | 69 | — | | Into the Gap |
| 1984 | "Lay Your Hands on Me" | 13 | 28 | — | 39 | — | 19 | 17 | — | — | — | BPI: Silver | non-album single |
| 1985 | "Roll Over" (Note: "Roll Over", released on 12 April 1985 on 7" & 12" vinyl, was intended to be the first official single from Here's to Future Days. It was withdrawn on the day of release, but some copies were sold and made it to the public. It featured a different version of the song with the 12" extended version titled "Roll Over (Again)". The B-side was a semi-instrumental version of "King for a Day" titled "Fools in Paradise".) | — | — | — | — | — | — | — | — | — | — | | Here's to Future Days |
| 1985 | "Lay Your Hands on Me" (remix) | — | — | 8 | — | — | — | — | — | 6 | 46 | | Here's to Future Days |
| 1985 | "Don't Mess with Doctor Dream" | 15 | 17 | — | 30 | 34 | 12 | 10 | 11 | — | — | | Here's to Future Days |
| 1985 | "King for a Day" | 22 | 20 | 12 | — | — | 4 | 10 | — | 8 | — | | Here's to Future Days |
| 1985 | "Revolution" | 56 | — | — | — | — | 43 | — | — | — | — | | Here's to Future Days |
| 1986 | "Nothing in Common" | — | — | 68 | — | — | — | — | — | 54 | 38 | | Nothing in Common soundtrack |
| 1987 | "Get That Love" | 66 | — | 75 | — | — | — | — | — | 31 | — | | Close to the Bone |
| 1987 | "Long Goodbye" | 89 | — | — | — | — | — | — | — | — | — | | Close to the Bone |
| 1987 | "Bush Baby" (Note: "Bush Baby" was released in 1987 as a promo 7" single with an exclusive 7" single version b/w "Follow Your Heart" on Arista Records.) | — | — | — | — | — | — | — | — | — | — | | Close to the Bone |
| 1988 | "In the Name of Love '88" | 46 | — | — | — | — | — | — | — | — | 1 | | The Best of Thompson Twins: Greatest Mixes |
| 1989 | "Sugar Daddy" | 97 | 155 | 36 | — | — | — | — | — | 28 | 2 | | Big Trash |
| 1989 | "Bombers in the Sky" | — | 152 | — | — | — | — | — | — | — | — | | Big Trash |
| 1990 | "Who Wants To Be A Millionaire?" (Note: "Who Wants to Be a Millionaire?" was released in December 1990, as the clearly labelled B-side to Deborah Harry & Iggy Pop's "Well Did You Evah?" on 7", 12" vinyl and CD single to promote the AIDS benefit album Red Hot + Blue. Only the Harry/Pop A-side charted.) | — | — | — | — | — | — | — | — | — | — | | Red Hot + Blue |
| 1991 | "Come Inside" | 56 | 149 | — | — | — | — | — | — | — | 7 | | Queer |
| 1992 | "The Saint" | 53 | — | — | — | — | — | — | — | — | — | | Queer |
| 1992 | "Groove On" | — | — | — | — | — | — | — | — | — | — | | Queer |
| 1992 | "Play with Me (Jane)" | 85 | — | — | — | — | — | — | — | — | — | | Cool World |
"—" denotes singles which were not released in that country or failed to chart.

== Music videos ==
- "Make Believe" (1981)
- "Lies" (1982)
- "Love on Your Side" (1983)
- "Watching" (1983)
- "Hold Me Now" (1983)
- "We are Detective" (1983)
- "Doctor! Doctor!" (1984)
- "You Take Me Up" (1984)
- "Sister of Mercy" (1984)
- "Lay Your Hands on Me" (1984)
- "Don't Mess with Doctor Dream" (1985)
- "King for a Day" (1985)
- "Revolution" (1985)
- "Nothing in Common" (1986)
- "Get That Love" (1987)
- "Long Goodbye" (1987)
- "Sugar Daddy" (1989)
- "Bombers in the Sky" (1990)
- "Come Inside" (1991)
- "The Saint" (1992)

== Videography ==
| Year | Title | Format |
|---|---|---|
| 1983 | "Side Kicks" - The Movie: Notes: Recorded live 13 May 1983 at the Royal Court, Liverpool | VHS/LaserDisc/DVD |
| 1984 | Into the Gap Live: Notes: Recorded live on September 30, 1984, at the Del Mar Racetrack, California. Released by BMG on vinyl 12 April 2025 and on digital 18 April 2025. | VHS/LaserDisc |
| 1985 | Single Vision: Notes: Collection of 11 promotional video clips | VHS/LaserDisc |

== Soundtrack appearances ==
- Ghostbusters (1984) - "In the Name of Love"
- Sixteen Candles (1984) - "If You Were Here"
- Explorers (1985) - "Doctor! Doctor!"
- Perfect (1985) - "Lay Your Hands on Me"
- Nothing in Common (1986) - "Nothing in Common"
- Lucas (1986) - "King For a Day"
- Gremlins 2: The New Batch (1990) - "Bombers in the Sky"
- Cool World (1992) - "Play with Me" and "Industry and Seduction" (Tom Bailey)
- The Wedding Singer (1997) - "Hold Me Now"
- Not Another Teen Movie (2001) - "If You Were Here"

== Video game ==
- The Thompson Twins Adventure (1984) - A video game adaptation of "Doctor! Doctor!"
