= Love On Your Side (song) =

Single by Thompson Twins

from the album Quick Step & Side Kick
- B-side: "Love On Your Back"
- Released: 10 January 1983
- Recorded: 1982
- Genre: New wave; synth-pop
- Length: 3:34
- Label: Arista
- Songwriters: Tom Bailey; Alannah Currie; Joe Leeway
- Producer: Alex Sadkin

Thompson Twins singles chronology
"Lies" (1982)	"Love On Your Side" (1983)	"We Are Detective" (1983)

Music video
- "Love On Your Side" on YouTube

"Love On Your Side" is a song by the English pop band Thompson Twins, released as the second single from the band's third studio album, Quick Step & Side Kick (1983), which was renamed Side Kicks in the US.

== Background and recording ==
In 1982, after the commercial failure of their second studio album Set, the Thompson Twins collaborated with producer Alex Sadkin to record Quick Step & Side Kick. Sadkin produced the album including "Love On Your Side".

The original lyrics were written by Alannah Currie, but were later altered to that of a male perspective, as Currie wasn't the lead vocalist. Tom Bailey has said of the song: "it's actually a complicated and quite dark song. It's about discovering that your girlfriend or boyfriend wants to experiment with a relationship in a much deeper or broader sense than you were prepared to do. And so it drags you into this kind of helpless feeling of being lost, helplessly in love, but taking some kind of confidence from the fact that love will help you through those difficult situations. So it's a naïve and complicated song."

== Release ==
"Love On Your Side" was released in January 1983 as a 7" and 12" single and as a 7" and 12" double pack including the free single "In the Name of Love". The 12" version featured extended mixes of the song. Mark Cooper reviewed the single for Record Mirror, saying that the song was "all intelligence and no flair". He felt that the song's chorus demonstrated an "indecent desire to be in the charts", whereas the verses "betray a desperate desire to remain witty and aloof."

It was the band's first top ten hit, reaching no. 9 on the UK Singles Chart, as well as no. 45 on the US Billboard Hot 100. It was also a top ten hit in New Zealand and Norway, a top twenty hit in Belgium and spent 14 weeks on the German singles chart.

== Track listing ==
- 12" Single (ARIST 12504, ARIST 12 504)
1. "Love On Your Side (Rap Boy Rap)" – 7:22
2. "Love On Your Side (No Talkin')" – 5:48
- 7" Single (ARIST 504)
1. "Love On Your Side" – 3:34
2. "Love On Your Back" – 4:06

== Official versions ==
1. UK Album Version – 4:25
2. US Album Version – 3:33
3. Extended Version – 7:22

== Sales chart performance ==
=== Weekly charts ===
Chart (1983)	Peak position
Australia (Kent Music Report)	80
Belgium Singles Chart	16
Canadian RPM Top Singles	47
Dutch Singles Chart	27
German Singles Chart	32
New Zealand Singles Chart	9
UK Singles Chart	9
US Billboard Hot 100	45
US Billboard Dance/Disco Top 80	6
US Cash Box Top 100	48

== See also ==
- 1983 in British music
- Thompson Twins discography
