= The Best of Thompson Twins: Greatest Mixes =

Remix album by Thompson Twins
- Released: July 1988
- Recorded: 1981–1988
- Genre: Synth-pop, new wave, dance-pop, funk, pop rock
- Length: 62:36
- Label: Arista
- Producer: Steve Lillywhite, Alex Sadkin, Nile Rodgers, Rupert Hine, Tom Bailey, Shep Pettibone

Thompson Twins chronology
Close to the Bone (1987)	The Best of Thompson Twins: Greatest Mixes (1988)	Big Trash (1989)

The Best of Thompson Twins: Greatest Mixes is the first compilation album released by the English pop group Thompson Twins. It was released in 1988, and features various 12" mixes and remixes of classic Thompson Twins songs. Most of the mixes were heavily edited by Tuta Aquino to fit into a single CD.

== Track listing ==
All tracks are written by Tom Bailey, Alannah Currie, and Joe Leeway except where noted.

No.	Title	Writer(s)	Length
1.	"In the Name of Love '88"	Tom Bailey, Alannah Currie, Joe Leeway, John Roog, Chris Bell, Peter Dodd, and Matthew Seligman	5:22
2.	"Lies"		5:22
3.	"Love on Your Side"		5:40
4.	"Lay Your Hands on Me"		5:13
5.	"The Gap"		8:34
6.	"Hold Me Now"		7:08
7.	"Doctor! Doctor!"		5:48
8.	"You Take Me Up"		8:29
9.	"King for a Day"		5:59
10.	"Perfect Day"		4:27
11.	"Get That Love"	Tom Bailey and Alannah Currie	4:57
