= FM3 (disambiguation) =

FM3 is a Beijing, China-based music duo.

FM3, FM 3 or FM-3 may also refer to:

- Farm to Market Road 3, a state-maintained highway in Texas
- Forza Motorsport 3, a racing game
- Front Mission 3, a tactical role-playing game
- FM3 Classical Music, the former name of RTÉ lyric fm

== See also ==
- Nikon FM3A, an SLR camera
