= In the Name of Love (Thompson Twins album) =

Compilation album by Thompson Twins
- Released: 1982
- Recorded: April 1981 – 1982
- Genres: New wave; alternative; post-punk
- Length: 39:54
- Label: Arista
- Producers: Steve Lillywhite; Mike Howlett; Dennis Bovell

Thompson Twins chronology
Set (1982)	In the Name of Love (1982)	Quick Step & Side Kick (1983)

In the Name of Love is the first Thompson Twins album released in the United States. The album was released in 1982 by Arista Records and comprises eight of the eleven tracks from their second studio album, Set, plus two of the singles from their debut studio album, A Product Of... (Participation) (neither of these albums were released separately in the US at that time).

The album was released on the strength of the single "In the Name of Love", which topped the dance music chart in Billboard magazine, reaching the number one position and staying there for five weeks between 22 May and 19 June 1982. The title track also peaked at number sixty-nine on the soul chart. The song was also featured two years later on the soundtrack for the movie Ghostbusters. The single was remixed in 1988, resulting in another number one single on the dance charts, as well as reaching number forty-six on the UK singles chart.

== Critical reception ==
Professional ratings
Review scores
Source	Rating
The Rolling Stone Album Guide	2.5/5 stars

M. Howell of The Boston Phoenix said that vocalist and keyboardist Tom Bailey "reportedly puts great stock in improvisation, and the Thompson Twins' catchall skittering across styles reflects this. But Bailey has built the Twins around the idea that you can throw almost anything into the mix as long as you have an engaging percussion track. In the Name of Love throws in steel drums, guitar feedback, Oriental structures, and sitar riffs – Bailey doesn’t care what it is or where it comes from, he only wants to keep the song moving."

== Track listing ==
1. "In the Name of Love" (s) 5:39 (extended)
2. "Living in Europe" (s) 3:30
3. "Bouncing" (s) 2:34
4. "The Rowe" (s) 6:30
5. "Make Believe" (p) 3:24 (single version with "Lama Sabach Tani" lyric)
6. "Runaway" (s) 3:16 (remix)
7. "Another Fantasy" (s) 4:00
8. "Fool's Gold" (s) 3:22
9. "Perfect Game" (p) 4:28
10. "Good Gosh" (s) 3:08

s – From Set
p – From A Product of ... (Participation)
