= Runaway (Thompson Twins song) =

1982 song by Thompson Twins

Single by Thompson Twins

from the album Set
- B-side: "Open Your Eye"
- Released: 14 May 1982
- Genre: Reggae
- Length: 3:13
- Label: T
- Songwriter: Tom Bailey
- Producer: Steve Lillywhite

Thompson Twins singles chronology
"In the Name of Love" (1982)	"Runaway" (1982)	"Lies" (1982)

"Runaway" is a song by the English pop band Thompson Twins, released by T Records on 14 May 1982 as the second and final single from their second studio album, Set. The song was written by Tom Bailey and produced by Steve Lillywhite.

== Release ==
The release of "Runaway" as a single from the band's album Set shortly followed a major change to the Thompson Twins line-up, as the seven-piece band was reduced down to the trio of Tom Bailey, Alannah Currie and Joe Leeway. As a result, "Runaway" was promoted by the trio. Bailey considered its release as a "kiss goodbye" to the old band and was reportedly much more excited about the upcoming recording of new material than the release of "Runaway" as a single, particularly as the song had been written a year ago at that point and was recorded by the old line-up.

"Runaway" was released by T Records on 14 May 1982. It failed to enter the UK Singles Chart, but did reach the unnumbered 'bubbling under' section for five consecutive weeks in June and July 1982, which would have been equivalent to a position between 76 and 100 at a time when the main charts covered the top 75. It also peaked at number 83 on the Record Business UK Top 100 Singles chart in June 1982.

== Critical reception ==
Upon its release as a single, reviews were largely negative. Fred Dellar of Smash Hits described "Runaway" as a "laboured jog-trot" which is "hardly representative of Set, the quite tasty album from which it is culled". He added, "Maybe the accompanying free live single will help shift a few extra copies. If not, the particular, Thomas Dolby-assisted 'Runaway' is likely to grind to a dead stop." John Shearlaw of Record Mirror remarked, "Another producer's special, this time giving a fairly ordinary album track a glossy mix, bringing Tom Dolby's persistent synth to the fore. But for the Thompson Twins it's the same old story; all influence and no substance. A pity." Paul Morley, writing for NME, commented, "When I hear such a single, I am in the middle of the sandy wasteland, and I am thinking of Edvard Munch's famous (scream) painting." Wattie Buchan, as guest reviewer for Melody Maker, called it "the worst out of all the singles I've reviewed" and added, "The title is appropriate. Play this once and you do want to run away."

== Track listing ==
7–inch single (UK and Europe)

1. "Runaway" – 3:13
2. "Open Your Eye" – 3:04

7–inch single with free limited edition live single (UK)

1. "Runaway" – 3:13
2. "Open Your Eye" – 3:04
3. "Living in Europe" (Recorded live at the Hammersmith Palais, April '82 by RAK Mobile) – 3:13
4. "Make Believe" (Recorded live at the Hammersmith Palais, April '82 by RAK Mobile) – 6:05

12–inch single (UK)

1. "Runaway" (Extended Remix) – 5:26
2. "Bouncing" (Extended Remix) – 4:54

12–inch single (Europe)

1. "Runaway" – 5:26
2. "Bouncing" – 4:54
3. "Open Your Eye" – 3:04

== Personnel ==
Thompson Twins

- Tom Bailey – vocals, piano, synthesizer, percussion
- Peter Dodd – synthesizer, guitar, percussion
- John Roog – guitar
- Matthew Seligman – bass
- Alannah Currie – percussion, saxophone
- Joe Leeway – congas, percussion, vocals
- Chris Bell – drums

Additional musicians

- Thomas Dolby – additional synthesiser ("Runaway", "Make Believe")

Production

- Steve Lillywhite – production ("Runaway", "Open Your Eye", "Bouncing")
- Tom Bailey – production ("Living in Europe", "Make Believe")
- Phil Thornalley – engineering ("Runaway", "Bouncing")
- John Rule – assistant engineering ("Runaway", "Bouncing")

Other

- Thomi Wroblewski – design and photo illustration

== Charts ==
Chart (1982)	Peak position
UK Top 100 Singles (Record Business)	83
