= Squares and Triangles =

Single by Thompson Twins
- B-side: "Could Be Her...Could Be You" "Weather Station" (1982 rerelease) "Modern Plumbing" (1982 rerelease)
- Released: April 28, 1980; February 26, 1982 (rerelease)
- Recorded: 1979
- Genre: Post-punk
- Length: 3:18
- Label: Dirty Discs; T Records
- Songwriters: Pete Dodd; Thompson Twins
- Producers: Alan O'Duffy; Alex Burak: Thompson Twins

Thompson Twins singles chronology
"Squares and Triangles" (1980)	"She's in Love with Mystery" (1980)

Alternative cover
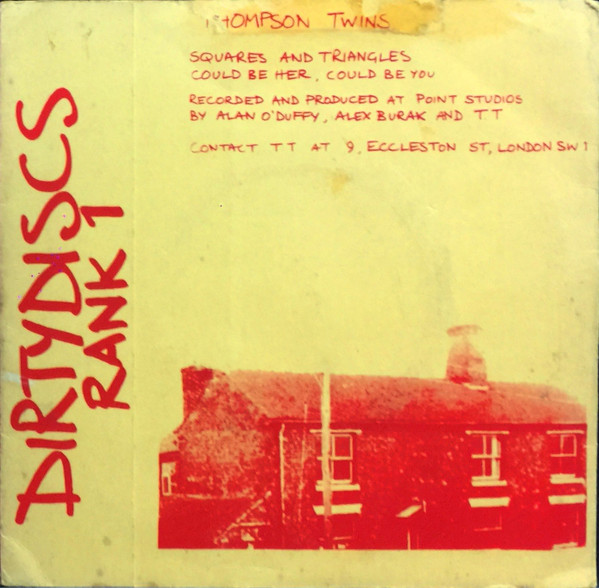
- Back cover

Alternative cover
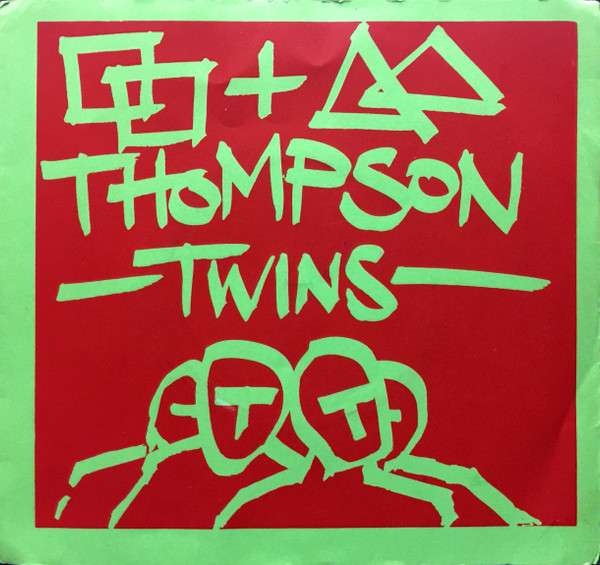
- Neon green sleeve

Alternative cover
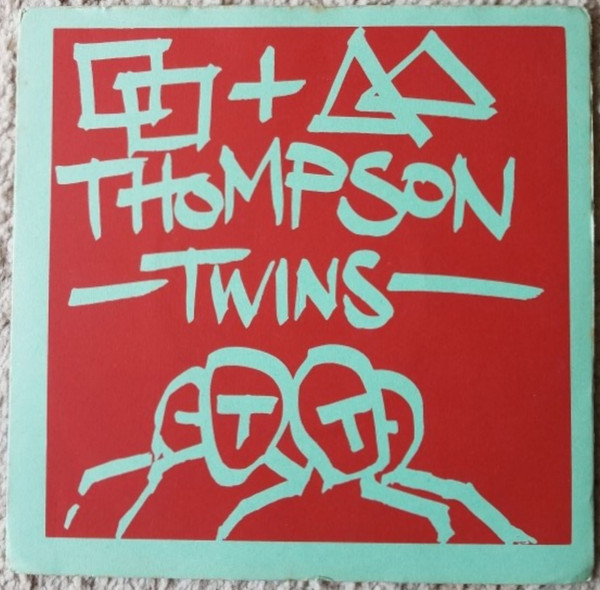
- Mint green sleeve

Alternative cover
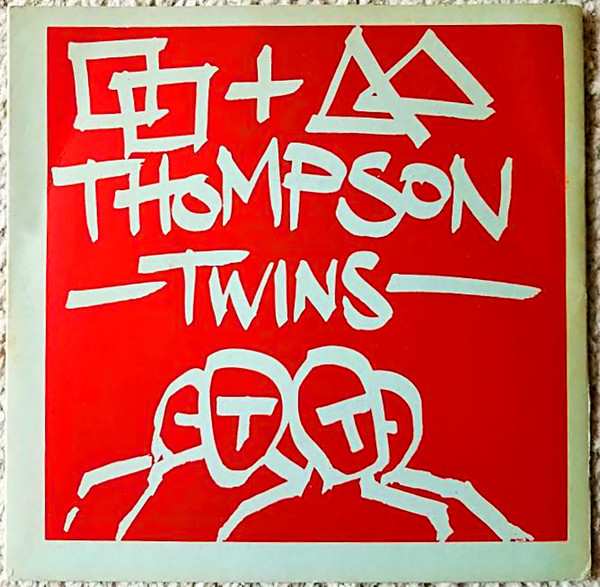
- Pale green sleeve

Alternative cover
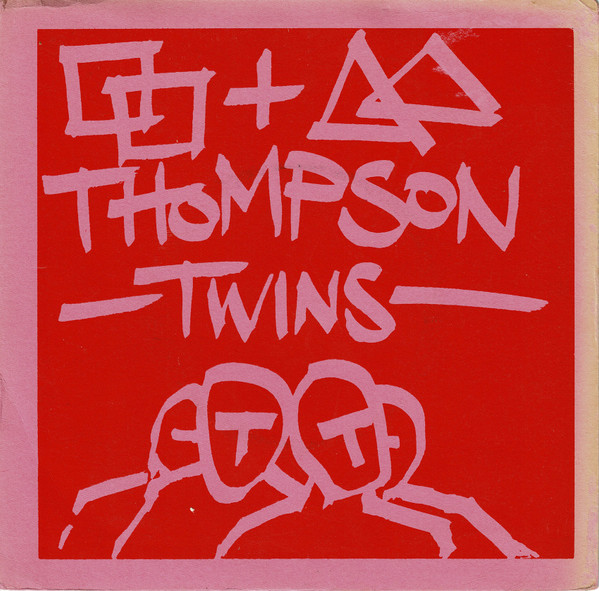
- Pink sleeve

Alternative cover
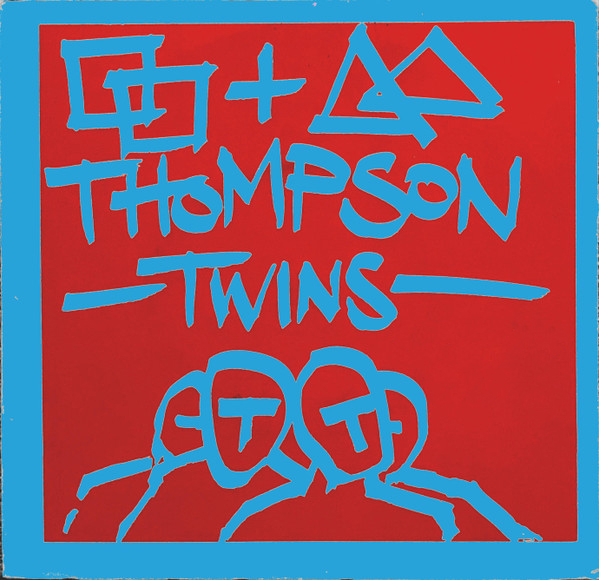
- Blue sleeve

Alternative cover
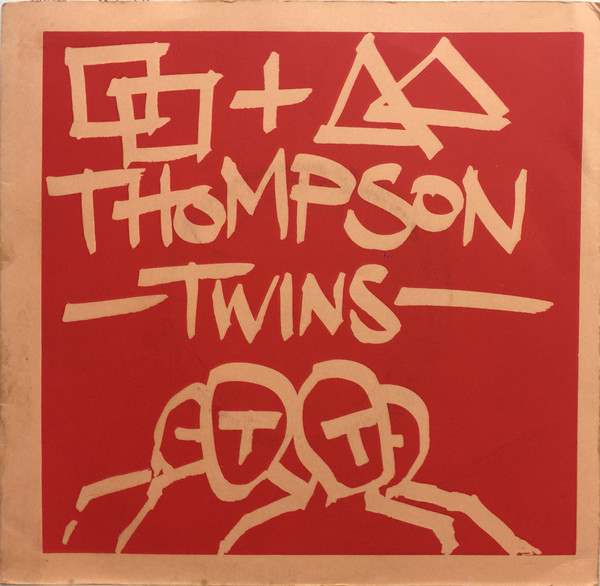
- Peach sleeve

Alternative cover
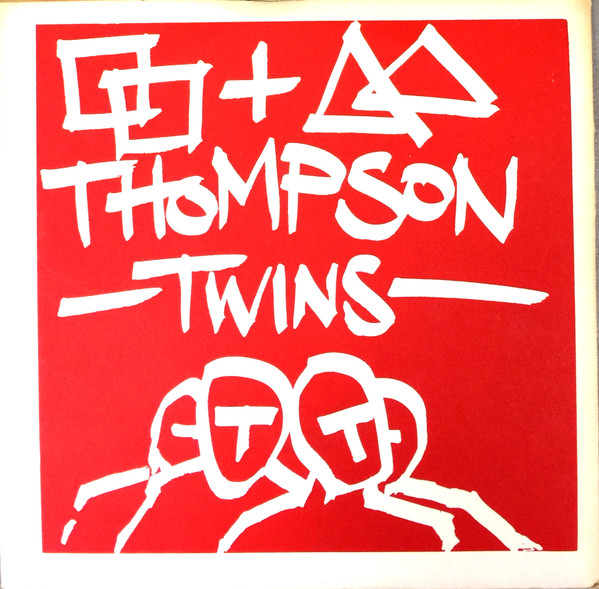
- White sleeve

Alternative cover
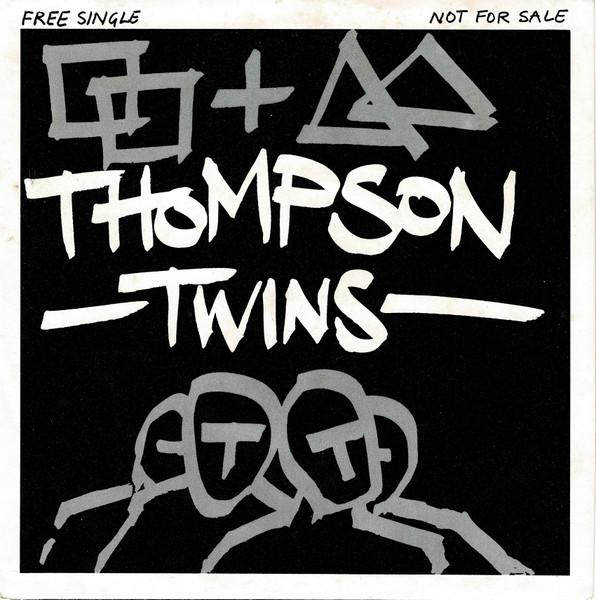
- Black-and-white 1982 rerelease

Alternative cover
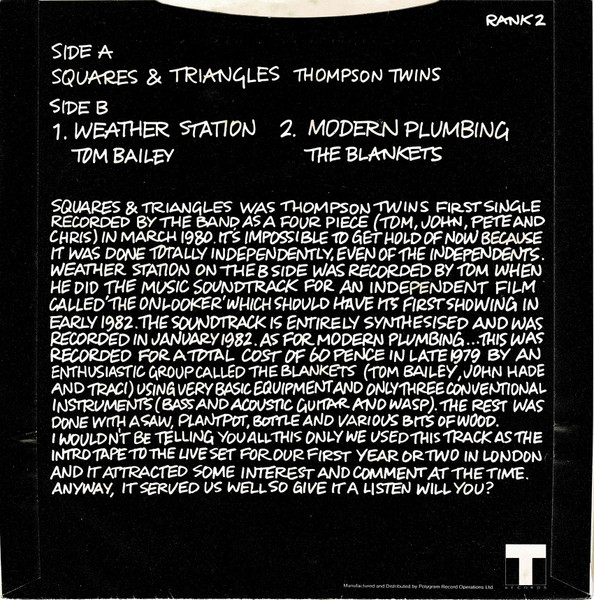
- Black-and-white 1982 rerelease back cover

"Squares and Triangles" is the debut single released by Thompson Twins. It was written when the band was a four-piece consisting of Tom Bailey (vocals and bass guitar), Pete Dodd (guitar), John Roog (guitar) and Chris Bell (drums).

The single was originally released in a variety of coloured card sleeves, all with red printing. Eight sleeve colour variations are known to exist: blue, neon green, mint green, pale green, peach, pink, white and yellow. Production of the single was entirely financed by the band and the manufacturer offered to print the sleeves on a variety of remaining card stock to help reduce costs. These colour variations were therefore a pragmatic cost-saving measure rather than a planned aesthetic choice.

In 1982, the single was rereleased in a black/white sleeve as a free EP along with the album Set featuring "Weather Station", a track composed by Tom Bailey for an independent film called The Onlooker (1982), and "Modern Plumbing", first recorded in late 1979 by the Blankets, a project including Bailey, John Hade and Traci Newton-Ingham. The track was recorded for a total cost of 60 pence and was used as the intro music for the band's early live shows in London. This information is written on the reverse of the rereleased 7" version included with some copies of Thompson Twins' second album (Set).

The front cover artwork was drawn by hand by Bailey.

"Squares and Triangles" was recognised as an important moment in the UK post-punk scene via its inclusion on the 2018 Cherry Red Records five-CD compilation To the Outside of Everything – A Story of Post Punk 1977–1981.

== Track listing ==
7" single
A. "Squares and Triangles" – 3:24
B. "Could Be Her, Could Be You" – 3:36

7" single (rerelease 1982 as free single with Set)
A. "Squares and Triangles" – 3:24
B1. "Weather Station" (Tom Bailey) – 1:09
B2. "Modern Plumbing" (The Blankets) – 5:48

== Personnel ==
- Recorded and produced at Point Studios
- Produced by Alan O'Duffy, Alex Burak and Thompson Twins
- Lyrics by Pete Dodd
- Vocals and bass guitar by Tom Bailey
- Guitars by Pete Dodd and John Roog
- Drums by Chris Bell
- Music by Thompson Twins
