= Bombers in the Sky =

Single by Thompson Twins

from the album Big Trash
- B-side: "Big Trash"
- Released: 1989
- Genre: Pop rock
- Length: 3:49
- Label: Warner Bros.
- Songwriter(s): Tom Bailey; Alannah Currie
- Producer(s): Tom Bailey; Alannah Currie

Thompson Twins singles chronology
"Sugar Daddy" (1989)	"Bombers in the Sky" (1989)	"Come Inside" (1991)

"Bombers in the Sky" is a song by Thompson Twins, which was released in 1989 as the second single from their seventh studio album Big Trash. The song was released as a cassette single in the US and also received promotional-only releases on 12-inch vinyl and CD. The song was featured in the movie Gremlins 2: The New Batch and clips of the film were used in the music video.

== Critical reception ==
In a review of Big Trash, Rick Nathanson of the Albuquerque Journal considered the song to have a "lullaby feel" with a "sinister nuclear warning". Chuck Campbell of The Palm Beach Post noted the song's "good, hammering beat". Tom Moon of The Philadelphia Inquirer considered much of Big Trash to be derivative and felt that "Bombers in the Sky" was a "rewrite" of INXS's "Guns in the Sky" but "without the urgent rhythm-guitar pattern". Diana Valois of The Morning Call felt "Bombers in the Sky" was the only song on the album deserving a listen and added "...as it should, having copped The Doors' 'Riders on the Storm' right down to the rhythm of the title!"

== Formats ==
Cassette single

1. "Bombers in the Sky" (LP Version) – 3:54
2. "Big Trash" (LP Version) – 3:07

12-inch promotional single

1. "Bombers in the Sky" (House Mix) – 5:25
2. "Bombers in the Sky" (House Instrumental) – 5:52
3. "Bombers in the Sky" (12" Remix) – 5:44
4. "Bombers in the Sky" (12" Remix Instrumental) – 4:00

CD promotional single

1. "Bombers in the Sky" (Single Version) – 3:49
2. "Bombers in the Sky" (7" Remix) – 3:51
3. "Bombers in the Sky" (12" Remix) – 5:44
4. "Bombers in the Sky" (House Mix) – 5:25

== Personnel ==
- Tom Bailey – producer, mixing
- Alannah Currie – producer
- Keith Fernley – mixing
- Phil Thornalley – mixing on "Single Version"

== Charts ==
Chart (1990)	Peak position
Australia (ARIA Charts)	152
