= We Are Detective =

Single by Thompson Twins

from the album Quick Step & Side Kick
- B-side: "Lucky Day"
- Released: April 1983
- Genre: Synth-pop; new wave
- Length: 3:05
- Label: Arista
- Songwriter(s): Tom Bailey; Alannah Currie; Joe Leeway
- Producer(s): Alex Sadkin

Thompson Twins singles chronology
"Love On Your Side" (1983)	"We Are Detective" (1983)	"Watching" (1983)

Music video
- "We Are Detective" on YouTube

"We Are Detective" is a 1983 song by the English pop band Thompson Twins. It was the third single from the band's third studio album, Quick Step & Side Kick (1983).

It was the band's second single to reach the UK Top Ten, peaking at no. 7. It also reached no. 48 in Alannah Currie's native New Zealand. A limited number of copies of the 12" single came with a free 12" of the tracks "Love Lies Fierce" and "Frozen in Time", both remixes of the songs "Love Lies Bleeding" and "Kamikaze" from the album.

== Track listing ==
- 12" single (ARIST 12 526, ARIST 12526)
1. "We Are Detective (More Clues)" – 6:00
2. "Lucky Day (Space Mix)" – 6:58
- 7" single (ARIST 526)
1. "We Are Detective" – 3:05
2. "Lucky Day" – 3:52

== Official versions ==
1. Album Version – 3:05
2. Extended Version – 6:00

== Sales chart performance ==
=== Weekly charts ===
Chart (1983)	Peak position
UK Singles Chart	7
New Zealand Singles Chart	48

== See also ==
- 1983 in British music
- Thompson Twins discography
