= Quick Step & Side Kick =

Studio album by Thompson Twins
- Released: 18 February 1983
- Recorded: 1982–1983
- Studios: Compass Point Studios (Nassau, The Bahamas); RAK Studios (London, England)
- Genres: Dance-pop; synth-pop
- Length: 37:48
- Label: Arista
- Producer: Alex Sadkin

Thompson Twins chronology
In the Name of Love (1982)	Quick Step & Side Kick (1983)	Into the Gap (1984)

Singles from Quick Step & Side Kick
- 1. "Lies" Released: 8 October 1982; 2. "Love On Your Side" Released: 21 January 1983; 3. "We Are Detective" Released: April 1983; 4. "Watching" Released: 8 July 1983 (UK and Ireland)

Quick Step & Side Kick is the third studio album by the English new wave band Thompson Twins. It was released on 18 February 1983 by Arista Records, and was their first album to be released as a trio (the band consisted of up to seven members during previous releases). The album reached no. 2 on the UK Albums Chart and was later certified Platinum by the BPI.

In the United States and Canada, the album was titled simply as Side Kicks, and was only the second Thompson Twins album to be released there.

The album was the first collaboration between the band and record producer Alex Sadkin and was recorded at Compass Point Studios in The Bahamas. The Jamaican singer Grace Jones (who had worked with Sadkin on three of her studio albums by that time) made a guest appearance on the track "Watching", though her vocals were not included on the track when it was remixed and released as a single in mid-1983.

Different versions of the album were released in several different territories, containing different tracks and different track orders. The UK, Canadian, and US cassette versions of the album also contained a whole side of remixes of various album tracks.

== Critical reception ==
Professional ratings
Review scores
Source	Rating
AllMusic	4.5/5 stars
Encyclopedia of Popular Music	4/5 stars
Record Collector	4/5 stars
Rolling Stone	3/5 stars
The Rolling Stone Album Guide	2.5/5 stars
Smash Hits	6/10

Reviewing the album in Record magazine, Crispin Sartwell noted that the songs "Love On Your Side", "Tears", "Love Lies Bleeding", and especially "Lies" achieved a funk that could appeal to both black and white listeners, but that the songs on Side Two of the record veer more towards the pretentious music of their first two albums. He nonetheless concluded the album to be one of the best examples of British funk to date.

The Rock Yearbook 1984 in summarising reviews in the British music press reported the album was "about as interesting as a Wolverhampton bus station at two in the morning", Record Mirror and "more like a labour in industrial design than a labour of love and inspiration", Melody Maker; New Musical Express was more positive, "not only multifaceted and musically mature, but upliftingly alive as well".

== Track listings ==
=== UK release ===
Side one

1. "Love On Your Side"
2. "Lies"
3. "If You Were Here"
4. "Judy Do"
5. "Tears"

Side two

1. "Watching"
2. "We Are Detective"
3. "Kamikaze"
4. "Love Lies Bleeding"
5. "All Fall Out"

=== US release ===
Side one

1. "Love On Your Side"
2. "Tears"
3. "Lies"
4. "We Are Detective"
5. "Love Lies Bleeding"

Side two

1. "Watching"
2. "If You Were Here"
3. "Kamikaze"
4. "Judy Do"
5. "All Fall Out"

=== Cassette remixes ===
1. "Love Lies Fierce" – 6:45 (dub remix of "Love Lies Bleeding")
2. "Long Beach Culture" – 6:48 (extended version of "Beach Culture")
3. "No Talkin'" – 6:18 (dub remix of "Lies")
4. "Rap Boy Rap" – 7:22 (original 12" version of "Love On Your Side")
5. "Frozen in Time" – 6:28 (dub remix of "Kamikaze")
6. "Fallen Out" – 3:30 (dub remix of "All Fall Out")

=== 2008 expanded edition ===
In March 2008, Quick Step & Side Kick was reissued as a two-disc set by Edsel Records and included the bonus remixes that appeared on the original 1983 cassette version of the album. The second disc included most major 12" versions and B-sides, some of which appeared on CD for the first time.

Disc one

1. "Love on Your Side" – 3:33
2. "Lies" – 3:13
3. "If You Were Here" – 2:56
4. "Judy Do" – 3:48
5. "Tears" – 5:02
6. "Watching" – 3:58
7. "We Are Detective" – 3:06
8. "Kamikaze" – 3:55
9. "Love Lies Bleeding" – 2:50
10. "All Fall Out" – 5:28
11. "Love Lies Fierce" – 6:45
12. "Long Beach Culture" – 6:48
13. "No Talkin'" – 6:18
14. "Rap Boy Rap" – 7:22
15. "Frozen in Time" – 6:28
16. "Fallen Out" – 3:30

Disc two

1. "Lies (Single Remix)" – 3:15
2. "Love on Your Back" – 4:06 (original B-side of the "Love On Your Side" 7" single)
3. "Lucky Day" – 3:52 (original B-side of the "We Are Detective" 7" single)
4. "Dancersaurus" – 4:40 (original B-side of the "Watching" 7" single)
5. "Lies (Bigger and Better)" – 6:35 (original 12" remix of "Lies")
6. "Beach Culture" – 3:55 (original B-side of the "Lies" 7" single)
7. "Love On Your Side (No Talkin')" – 5:48 (B-side of the original "Love On Your Side" 12" single)
8. "We Are Detective (More Clues)" – 6:00 (original 12" remix of "We Are Detective")
9. "Lucky Day (Space Mix)" – 6:58 (B-side of the "We Are Detective" 12" single)
10. "Watching (You Watching Me)" – 5:48 (original 12" remix of "Watching")
11. "Dancersaurus (Even Large Reptiles Have Emotional Problems)" – 5:50 (B-side of the "Watching" 12" single)

== Charts ==
=== Weekly charts ===
Chart (1983–84)	Peak position
Australian Albums (Kent Music Report)	85
Canada Top Albums/CDs (RPM)	26
Dutch Albums (Album Top 100)	47
New Zealand Albums (RMNZ)	7
Swedish Albums (Sverigetopplistan)	27
UK Albums (Official Charts)	2
US Billboard 200	34

=== Year-end charts ===
Chart (1983)	Position
New Zealand Albums (RMNZ)	23

== Sales and certifications ==
Region	Certification	Certified units/sales
New Zealand (RMNZ)	Gold	7,500^{^}
United Kingdom (BPI)	Platinum	300,000^{^}
^{^} Shipments figures based on certification alone.

== Personnel ==
Thompson Twins

- Tom Bailey – vocals, synthesizers, drum programming
- Joe Leeway – synthesizers, congas, vocals
- Alannah Currie – percussion, xylophone, vocals

Additional musicians

- Boris Williams – cymbals on "If You Were Here" and "Tears"
- Monte Brown – guitars on "Watching"
- Grace Jones – backing vocals on "Watching"

Production

- Alex Sadkin – producer
- Phil Thornalley – engineer
- Mike Nocito – tape op at RAK studios
- Ted Jensen – mastering at Sterling Sound (New York City, US).
- David Shortt – art direction
- Satori Graphic – design
- Jeremy Pemberton – design
- Roger Charity – photography
- John Hade – management
