= A Product Of... (Participation) =

A Product of...

Studio album by Thompson Twins
- Released: 5 June 1981
- Recorded: April 1981
- Genres: New wave; post-punk; experimental pop
- Label: T Records
- Producers: Dennis Bovell; Thompson Twins; "Politics" & "Vendredi Saint" by Mike Howlett

Thompson Twins chronology
A Product of... (1981)	Set (1982)

Singles from A Product Of...
- 1. "Squares and Triangles" Released: April 1980 (UK); 2. "She's In Love With Mystery" Released: September 1980 (UK); 3. "Perfect Game" Released: January 31, 1981 (UK and Germany); 4. "Animal Laugh (Oumma Aularesso)" Released: June 12, 1981 (UK); 5. "Make Believe (Let's Pretend)" Released: September 1981 (UK and Canada); 6. "Politics" Released: 1981 (Germany)

A Product of... (sometimes known as A Product of... Participation) is the first studio album by the English pop group the Thompson Twins. It was released in June 1981 on the T Records imprint, a label created by the band and distributed through the Fame/EMI label. At the time of its release, the band were a six-piece group that did not include later member Alannah Currie (although she is thanked in the credits for "playing and singing" on the record).

The self-produced album had a post-punk sound that was heavily influenced by African rhythms and chants. The band had already built a strong reputation for themselves due to their live shows, where often members of the audience were encouraged to join the band onstage and pound along with them on makeshift percussion such as hubcaps and pieces of metal.

All of the songs on the album were written by the band themselves, except for two ethnic traditionals, both arranged by Tom Bailey.

== Release ==
"Perfect Game" is the first single taken from A Product Of... (Participation). It was released on 30 January 1981 on the T Records imprint, a label created by the band and distributed through the Fame/EMI label. The B-side to the single is the single mix of "Politics".

In September 2008, the band's first two albums, A Product of... and Set, were released as a double CD. This version included their earliest singles, non-album tracks, and extended remixes.

== Critical reception ==
Professional ratings
Review scores
Source	Rating
AllMusic	2.5/5 stars
Encyclopedia of Popular Music	2/5 stars
Record Mirror	4/5 stars
The Rolling Stone Album Guide	2/5 stars
Smash Hits	6/10 stars

Contemporarily, Harlow Star critic Roger Fulton commented on the album's numerous influences, including Talking Heads, but believed that "thoughts of the Thompson Twins merely being an amalgam of other people's sounds are quickly dispelled by some of the wildest rhythms this side of the Sahara", praising the band for writing "thinking, thoughtful songs" (such as "Politics", "Perfect Game" and "Slave Trade") in addition to "invigorating rhythmic excursions" like "Oumma Aularesso" that are "adventurous and completely engaging". However, he did believe that the band's live shows were "even better" than the album. Smash Hits' Ian Birch found Thompson Twins "More interesting for what they promise then what they deliver, the T.T.s are sometimes too ambitious. When variety is this diverse, the group's identity takes second place" and that they "succeed best when they're as simple as in "When I See You"."

Retrospectively, the album is regarded as the first of two experimental pop records that the Thompson Twins recorded before moving towards a more mainstream sound. AllMusic writer Evan Cater commented that A Product Of... (Participation) was drastically different than the group's later pop records, being "more experimental and more guitar based than the keyboard dominated hits of Into the Gap and Here's to Future Days", as well as favouring "murky tuneless noodling" over the pop hooks they were later known for. He noted the album's international theme, exemplified by the artwork, the heavy influence from African music (most notably on "Slave Trade" and "Oumma Aularesso (Animal Laugh)," the latter of which was a traditional Sierra Leone song rearranged by Bailey), as well as the reinterpretation of the Gregorian chant "Vendredi Saint" as either "an Asian or African chant (it isn't entirely clear which)."

Ira Robbins of Trouser Press noted that in addition to playing their primary instruments, all six musicians contribute percussion. However, he notes that the "cleverness and variety of the tracks ... eliminate any potential monotony that might have resulted from the heavy reliance on rhythm. And although the music is designed to incite maximum motion, there isn’t one track that skimps on lyrical, melodic or structural depth." He concluded that while the record is not "uniformly wonderful", its textures and sounds "make it pleasurable and energizing." Colin Larkin wrote in The Virgin Encyclopedia of Popular Music (1997) that, despite the group's invigorating, punk-esque live shows prior to the album, in which they invited audience members to beat rhythms to their songs, A Product Of... (Participation) "showed a band struggling to make the transition from stage to studio". Also negative in his reappraisal, Dave Marsh rated the album two stars out of five in The Rolling Stone Album Guide (1983). Referring to the album as "a conglomeration of pop, reggae funk and African rhythms", he concluded that the music is "engaging but lacks real substance."

== Track listing ==
All tracks composed by Thompson Twins; except where indicated

=== Original album ===
1. "When I See You"
2. "Politics"
3. "Slave Trade"
4. "Could Be Her...Could Be You"
5. "Make Believe"
6. "Don't Go Away"
7. "The Price"
8. "Oumma Aularesso (Animal Laugh)" (Traditional from Sierra Leone; arranged by Tom Bailey)
9. "Anything Is Good Enough"
10. "A Product Of..."
11. "Perfect Game"
12. "Vendredi Saint" (Traditional Gregorian chant; arranged by Tom Bailey)

=== 2008 re-issue bonus tracks ===
1. "Squares and Triangles"
2. "Could Be Her...Could Be You" (original version)
3. "Weather Station" (written and recorded by Bailey for the independent film The Onlooker)
4. "Modern Plumbing" (written by Bailey; recorded by the Blankets, a separate group that included him)
5. "She's in Love With Mystery"
6. "Fast Food"
7. "Food Style"
8. "Oumma Aularesso (Animal Laugh)" (original remixed extended version)
9. "A Dub Product"
10. "Make Believe (Let's Pretend)" (extended version)
11. "Lama Sabach Tani"

== Personnel ==
- Tom Bailey – bass, lead vocals, keyboards, percussion, reeds
- Chris Bell – drums, backing vocals, percussion
- Peter Dodd – guitar, backing vocals, percussion, saxophone
- Joe Leeway – congas, backing vocals, percussion
- John Roog – guitar, backing vocals, percussion
- Jane Shorter – saxophone, percussion

Technical

- Steve Dewey – engineer, mixing
- Alan O'Duffy, John Hade, Tom Bailey – mixing
- Jonathan Phipps – cover art
