= Set (Thompson Twins album) =

Studio album by Thompson Twins
- Released: 26 February 1982
- Recorded: 1981–82
- Genres: Experimental pop; dance; new wave; alternative rock; post-punk
- Label: T Records
- Producer: Steve Lillywhite

Thompson Twins chronology
A Product of... (1981)	Set (1982)	In the Name of Love (1982)

Singles from Set
- 1. "In the Name of Love" Released: January 1982; 2. "Runaway" Released: May 1982 (UK)

Set is the second studio album by the English pop band Thompson Twins. Released in February 1982, it was the second album they recorded for their own T Records imprint, which was released by Arista Records/Hansa.

Compared to their first album, A Product Of..., Set featured a more polished sound, thanks to producer Steve Lillywhite. With their ever-shifting line-up, the Thompson Twins had now swelled to seven members, adding Matthew Seligman on bass guitar to free up Tom Bailey for full frontman duties and keyboards. Former sax player Jane Shorter was replaced by Alannah Currie, who was Bailey's girlfriend at the time (they later married and remained together until 2004). Three songs on the album do not feature Bailey on lead vocals, but are sung by Joe Leeway, who is also credited as writer or co-writer for five tracks. While not an official member of the band, Thomas Dolby was also on hand to play additional keyboards on three tracks.

While the album was given praise by critics, the band found themselves on the verge of yet another personnel change. The track "In the Name of Love" was written by Bailey simply as album filler, but was ultimately chosen as the lead single from the album. While failing to make the UK singles chart, the single was released in the United States as a club single and went to number one on Billboard magazine's dance chart, holding that position for five weeks (from 22 May – 19 June 1982).

The success of the track opened many doors for the band, who suddenly had the potential to be more than just an underground sensation. Together with the band's manager, John Hade, Bailey then reinvented the band as a trio, keeping Currie and Leeway while firing the others.

In the UK, a limited number of copies of the album were released with a free single which featured the tracks "Squares and Triangles", "Weather Station", and "Modern Plumbing".

Set was also released in the United States on the Arista label as In the Name of Love, which saw three of the album's tracks replaced by two songs from the band's first album, A Product of....

In September 2008, A Product of... and Set were re-released as a double-CD set. Each disc included early singles, non-album tracks, and extended remixes.

== Legacy ==
Professional ratings
Review scores
Source	Rating
Encyclopedia of Popular Music	2/5 stars

Retrospectively, Set is regarded as the final of two experimental pop records that the Thompson Twins recorded before moving towards a more mainstream sound. Ira Robbins of Trouser Press writes that, despite the addition of former Soft Boys bassist Matthew Seligman to the lineup, Set is to its predecessor A Product Of... (Participation) (1981). He praises it as an album of "totally listenable dance music that doesn't beg suspension of critical faculties", highlighting songs such as "In the Name of Love" and "Bouncing".

== Track listing ==
=== Original Album ===
All songs written by Tom Bailey except where noted.

1. "In the Name of Love"
2. "Living in Europe"
3. "Bouncing" – (Bailey, Joe Leeway)
4. "Tok Tok" – (Bailey, Leeway, Julian S. Subero)
5. "Good Gosh" – (Leeway)
6. "The Rowe"
7. "Runaway"
8. "Another Fantasy"
9. "Fool's Gold"
10. "Crazy Dog" – (Leeway, Pete Dodd)
11. "Blind" – (Bailey, Leeway)

=== 2008 Reissue bonus tracks ===
1. "In the Name of Love" (12" Dance Extension)
2. "In the Beginning"
3. "Coastline"
4. "Open Your Eye"
5. "Runaway" (extended remix)
6. "Bouncing" (extended remix)
7. "In the Name of Love" (Big Value Version/New Super Synthesized Version)
8. "Living in Europe" (Live at the Hammersmith Palais, April 1982)

== Personnel ==
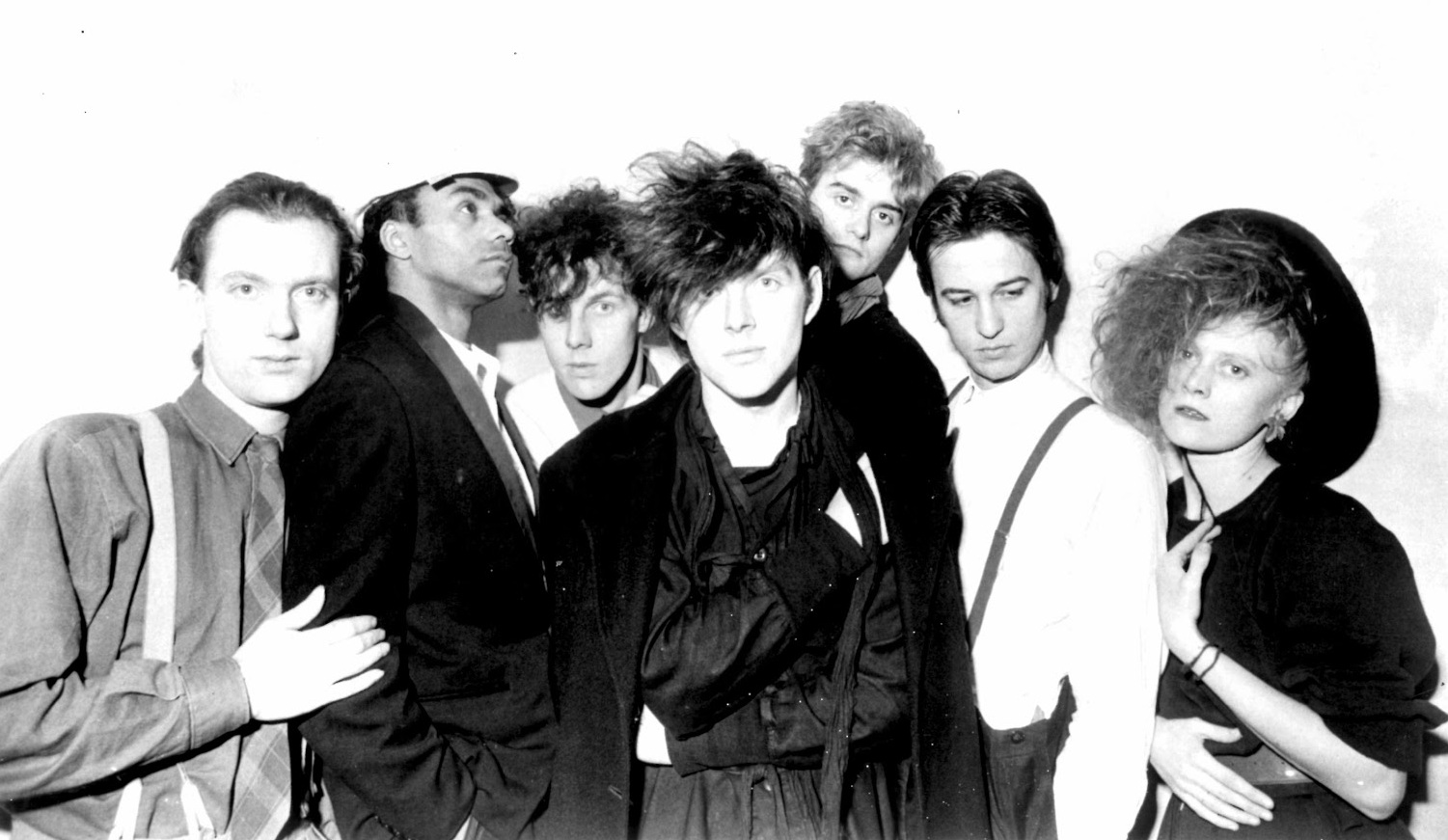
Thompson Twins in 1982

Thompson Twins

- Tom Bailey – vocals, pianos, synthesizers, percussion
- Peter Dodd – synthesizers, guitars, percussion
- John Roog – guitars
- Matthew Seligman – bass
- Chris Bell – drums
- Alannah Currie – percussion, saxophone
- Joe Leeway – congas, percussion, vocals

Additional musicians

- Thomas Dolby – additional synthesizers (6, 7, 9)

== Production ==
- Steve Lillywhite – producer
- Phil Thornalley – engineer
- John Rule – assistant engineer
- Thomi Wroblewski – sleeve design, photography

== See also ==
- Thompson Twins discography
