= Jan Linton =

British musician

- Also known as: Dr. Jan (guru)
- Genres: Electronic, ambient, rock, dance
- Years active: 1990–present
- Labels: Burning Shed; King Records, Entropy Records

Jan Linton is a British singer, musician and producer from Warrington.

== Biography ==
One of the first few western musicians to ever sign directly to a Japanese major label (King Records) Linton helped internationalize the Japanese music industry, and formed a band called Dr.Jan (guru) which played frequently at large venues. Under the band's name, he released three albums over the next few years: starting with Alienshamanism in 2000 However, the live members often changed and rarely appeared on the albums; instead, a number of well-known musicians contributed to the recording sessions, such as Duran Duran's John Taylor. The albums also included reworkings of the unreleased tracks Linton had recorded with Bill Nelson (musician).

Linton made several releases in 2000 in the UK, Japan, and Europe. The singles "Inner Sanctum" ("Can't You Feel") and "Sarajevo" were both number one hits on the MP3 electronic music charts in several countries. Linton also released the first of a series of experimental albums under his own name, on the "Kaerucafe" label, which is noted for experimental and sampling CDs. Inspired by the notoriously difficult to program Yamaha DX7 synthesizer as used by Brian Eno, Music for Aliens was the best selling sampling CD in national stores such as Yamaha. In 2001 a collaborative project with the former Japan and Porcupine Tree synthesist, Richard Barbieri, was again marketed as a sampling CD and titled Cosmic Prophets.

In 2004, King Records signed Linton to make another album as Dr.Jan (guru). Entitled Planet Japan, it was in a rock/cyberpunk style (such as a cover version of the John Foxx-period Ultravox! song "Hiroshima Mon Amour"), and the controversial subject matter — Linton's occasionally bitter experiences in Tokyo — caused a slight stir in the Japanese media.

A UK promotional video (and later, CD/DVD single) of a drum n bass reworking of Bauhaus's "Dark Entries" (from the Communion album) followed, but due to label disputes was never fully released. This marks the last use of the name Dr.Jan (guru) to date.

In early 2011, Entropy Records released Linton's 2009–2010 reworkings of the sounds of FM3's Buddha Machine versions 1 and 2, but following the 9.0 magnitude Tōhoku earthquake and tsunami and subsequent releases of radioactive materials in Japan (where Linton had returned in 2007) delayed the release until late March.

In 2012, he released a benefit CD for Sendai earthquake reconstruction with contributions from Matthew Seligman. In 2015–2017, he recorded two separate releases of an album entitled I Actually Come Back, collaborating in part once more with Seligman and Leo Abrahams. In 2020, following Matthew Seligman's death, the Sendai EP was re-released in an expanded form, followed by a second EP of previously recorded material.

Since 2020, he has also become notable for his use of East Asian instrumentation such as the Zhongruan and Taishōgoto synthesiser on other artists' commercial releases

== Discography ==
=== Albums ===
- Oinaru Sekai (TrueNirvana) (1993) Polystar HI-1023
- Music for Aliens (2000) Kaerucafe 0104
- Alienshamanism (2000) [Dr.Jan (guru)] Nap/25 FO26
- Selected Esoterica (2003) [Dr.Jan (guru)] Kaerucafe 28186842354
- Communion (2003) [Jan Linton/Dr.Jan (guru)] Explosion RT0005
- Planet Japan (2004) King Records KICP1014
- Buddha Machine Music mini-album (2011) Entropy Records EM 007
- I Actually Come Back mini album (2015) [Jan Linton with Leo Abrahams] Burning Shed
- I Actually Come Back Full album with bonus mini album "Buddha Machine Music" (2016–17) [Jan Linton with Leo Abrahams] Entropy Records/jansongs

=== EPs ===
- The Eternal Desire Machines of Dr Jan EP (1999) Global Vision Music GVM0010
- Sendai 仙台 EP (2012) [Jan Linton with Matthew Seligman] Entropy Records ED 006
- Sendai 仙台 Extended Reissue EP (2020) [Jan Linton with Matthew Seligman] jansongs/MRC
- King Hong EP (2020) [Jan Linton with Matthew Seligman] jansongs/MRC
- Byzantine Remixes EP (2021) jansongs/MRC
- Strange Effect Extended Play EP (2023) jansongs/MRC

=== Singles ===
- "Inner Sanctum (Can't You Feel)" (2000) Groove 052
- Melatonin (2022) jansongs/MRC
- Always the Last to Dream (2022) jansongs/MRC
- joy (2023) (2023) jansongs/MRC
- Behind the Mask (2023) jansongs/MRC
- Rosemary (2023) jansongs/MRC
- Strange Effect (2023) jansongs/MRC
- Don't Cry at Christmas (2023) jansongs/MRC
- 30th Century Man (2024) jansongs/MRC
- Can I Feel your Love (2025) jansongs/MRC

=== Collaboration albums ===
- Global Dance Music Vol.2 "6 Ritual" Dr.Jan (& Scorpio Family) Sony Records SRCS7425 (1994)
- "Retreat into Art track "King Porn" Dr.Jan (guru) mix 2-CD (2001) [John Taylor] TTP TTP1201A
- Cosmic Prophets sampling sound collection (2001) [Richard Barbieri & Jan Linton] Kaerucafe 0130
- Ruff wiv Da Smoove step,uk garage and r'n'b'construction kit (2002) [Frame Shift] Kaerucafe 0143

=== Collaboration singles ===
- "Anemone" (2007) [Jan Linton with Leo Abrahams] Just Music/Bip Hop
- Typical London Weather (2023) [Jan Linton with Logan Sky] jansongs/Etrangers Musique
- Forbidden Colours (Merry Xmas Mr Lawrence)) (2025)[Jan Linton with Fluid Japan]

=== Compilation albums ===
- communion 2 download compilation (2015?) Burning Shed
