= FM3 =

China-based music duo

- Origin: China
- Years active: 1999–present
- Members: Christiaan Virant and Zhang Jian

FM3 (sometimes stylized as FM三) is a Beijing, China-based music duo consisting of Christiaan Virant and Zhang Jian. They are considered among the pioneers of electronic music in China. Since 1999, Virant and Jian have been creating meditative music by combining the sound of Chinese classical instruments with modern digital techniques. The duo is best known for its 2005 release, the Buddha Machine loop player.

== History ==
A United States native, Virant moved to China in the 1980s to study Chinese music and culture. In 1999, Virant joined Zhang Jian to form FM3, a project that allowed the pair to experiment with music that combined the sound of Chinese classical instruments with modern digital techniques. Starting out as "the ambient, chill-out band that played in the back room" of Beijing clubs, the project evolved into a "meditative" sound.

In November 2013, Virant announced the release of a forthcoming FM3 album, called Ting Shuo, on his YouTube channel. During late 2013 and early 2014, FM3 presented live shows at events in China and Thailand, with most of the Thai gigs featuring Virant performing alone. On March 22, 2014, Virant played at the EESE Experimental Electronic South East arts festival in Bangkok under the moniker "FM3v", used for his solo performances of the project's work. As part of his appearance at EESE 2014, Virant also conducted a workshop on 23 March, at which he spoke about the Buddha Machine invention.

== Buddha Machine ==
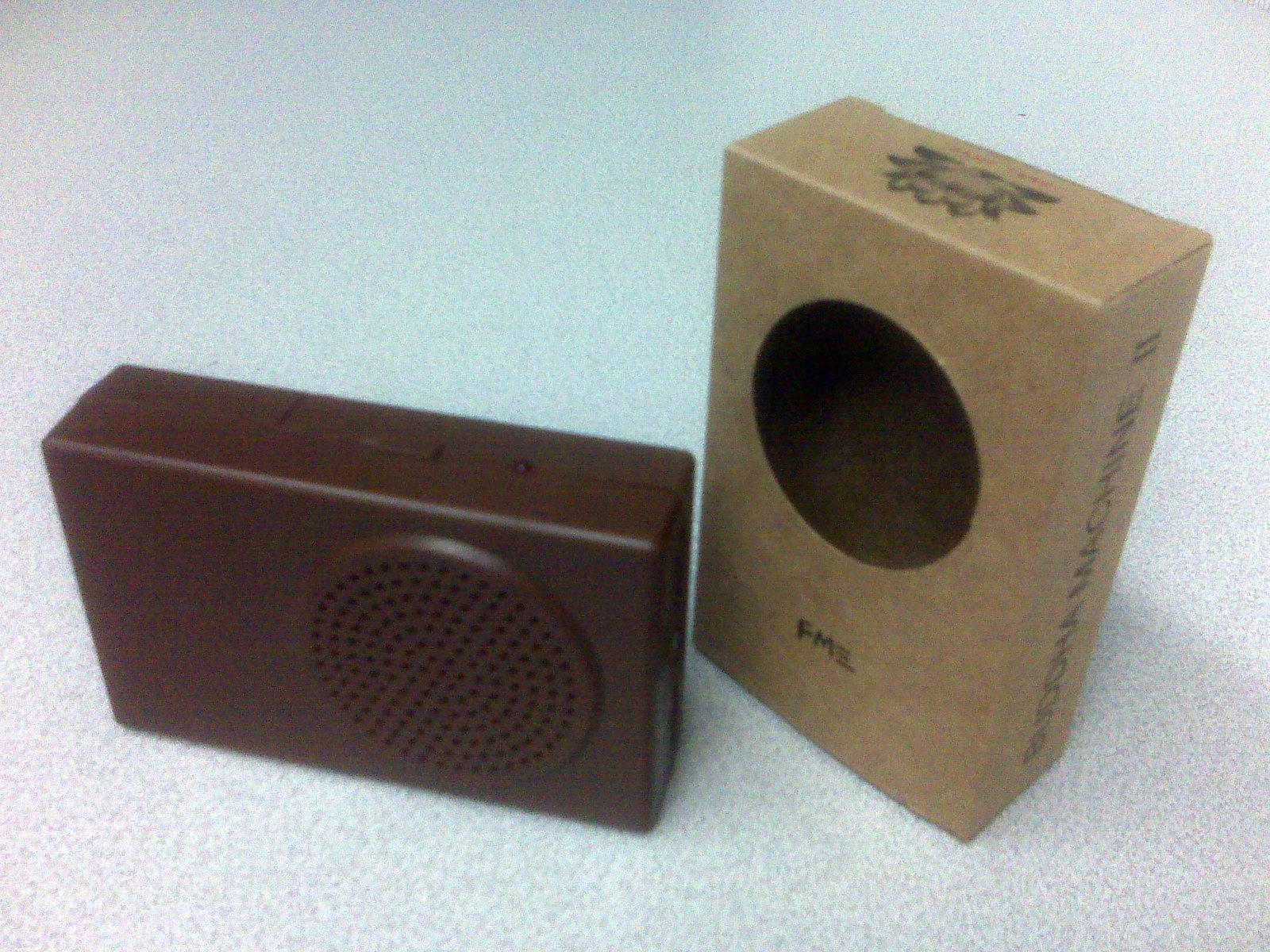
Buddha Machine 2.0

In 2005, FM3 began work on a small musical loop player that the group called the Buddha Machine. The Buddha Machine fulfills certain criteria of a generative music device, while the idea of layering loops of ambient sound is credited to Brian Eno, who worked similarly using tape machines for installations. Eno was himself an early supporter of the Buddha Machine.

Roughly the size of a pack of cigarettes, the device features a single toggle switch to cycle through samples, a combined power and volume dial, and an integrated speaker. The device contains a chip holding nine digitally encoded drones, ranging in length from 1.5 to 40 seconds. The name and idea is derived from a popular Chinese device that intones repeating loops of Buddhist chanting. In an interview with the public radio show Studio 360, regarding the creation of the Buddha Machine, Virant said he was inspired by a device found in a Buddhist temple. Attracted to its design, he applied its construction as a means of presenting his loop-based music.

Following the original version, two other editions of the Buddha Machine have been released: The second unit, released in 2008, features nine new loops and pitch control, while the third unit (entitled Chan Fang 禅房; translated as Zen Room) – released in 2010 – replaced the electronic drones on the first two units with loops performed on the Gu Qin, an ancient Chinese classical instrument. Following the release of the third version, the band also produced apps for the iPhone and iPad with similar functionality to the physical devices.

The pair collaborated with industrial music pioneers Throbbing Gristle and Industrial Records in 2009 to make a Buddha Machine model entitled "Gristleism". According to the promotional material, the Gristleism features "thirteen original and uncompromising loops" and a “mix of signature TG experimental noise, industrial drone, and classic melodies and rhythms”. As of March 2014, the limited-edition product is no longer available.

In November 2012, the fourth-generation Buddha Machine was released, containing eight new loops and encased in a “dayglo” case that was available in four colours. In 2013, FM3 collaborated with Japanese musician Keigo Oyamada, better known as Cornelius, to produce a loop-playing device called “Ghost in the Machine”. The device contains three tracks from Oyamada's soundtrack for the anime film Ghost in the Shell: Arise.

David Byrne, in his book How Music Works, references the Buddha Machine as an early step toward a future where all types of music could be machine generated. Additionally, in his online journal, Byrne compared the device to both the work of composer John Cage and oral literary traditions, writing in 2011:

…a transistor radio sized device that plays endlessly changing sounds, chosen by the program, from a given set of notes and sounds. There is, as one would expect, no arc to these compositions – no beginning, middle and/or end. They are merely states of being, not substitutes for narrative. These indeterminate scores can be viewed a bit like the literature that emerges out of oral traditions – the great epics and sagas.

A Buddha Machine collaboration with Philip Glass, Philip Glass 80, was released in January 2017 to celebrate the composer's 80th birthday.

The original Buddha Machine 1 was re-released in a slightly redesigned form in November 2017, available in four colors: green, blue, red, and orange.

The original Buddha Machine 1 is slated to be re-released again, in November 2023, with upgraded sound quality (louder speaker) and user experience (two new individual side buttons make device control more direct and intuitive). It will be available in the same four colors as the 2017 re-release, as well as a limited edition pink version.

== Reception ==
The music of FM3 has been described as “poetic noise”, “confrontationally tranquil”, and “engagingly intimate”.

The original Buddha Machine, released in 2005, was positively received and has been described as “beautifully useless”, “mesmerizing”, and “addictive, spellbinding, hypnotic”.

== Discography ==
In addition to the Buddha Machine, FM3 has a number of releases on CD and vinyl formats, and their music appears in various film and television soundtracks in China and the West.

=== Albums ===
- "Hou Guan Yin" (with Dou Wei), Lona Records (CD, Dig), Hong Kong, 2006
- "Mort Aux Vaches" (Part of the Mort Aux Vaches series), Staalplaat (CD), 2005
- "Radio Pyongyang" Sublime Frequencies (CD), USA, 2005
- "Streets of Lhasa" Sublime Frequencies (CD), USA, 2005
- "Chuan Song" FM3 Zhang, Kwanyin (CD), China, 2005
- "Jing Hua Yuan Ji" (with Dou Wei), Shanghai Audio Visual (CD), China, 2004
- "Bu Ke Neng" (with Yan Jun and Wu Quan), Kwanyin (CD), China, 2003
- "Ting Shuo (听说), CVMK (CD), Hong Kong, 2014

=== Spin-off albums ===
- Layering Buddha - On October 27, 2006, Robert Henke released an album called Layering Buddha which contains 10 tracks that have been created by "filtering, pitching and layering either the original loops, or new loops which were re-assembled out of parts of the originals."
- Jukebox Buddha - In November 2006 Berlin record label Staubgold released a 15-track album of Buddha Machine remixes entitled Jukebox Buddha. Contributors include Sun City Girls, Sunn O))), Thomas Fehlmann, Jan Jelinek with Andrew Pekler and Hanno Leichtmann, Einstürzende Neubauten's Blixa Bargeld, Monolake's Robert Henke, Alog, and Mapstation among others.
- Buddha Machine Music - In March 2011, Jan Linton released a mini album from Entropy Records called Buddha Machine Music a mini CD of 22 minutes which contains 6 compositions by Jan Linton using treated sounds from Buddha Machines 1.0 and 2.0, along with his performances on various instruments including the zhongruan and saz.
- He Xie Fu - A new version of the "Jukebox Buddha" remix compilation was released in November 2011 by FM3. The compilation features a lineup of all Chinese artists.

=== Tracks appear on ===
- "P.Pa, Zheng" Bip-Hop Generation [v.7] (CD, Dig), BiP_HOp, 2004
- "Ambience Sinica" Very Best of the Far East (CD), Nascente, UK, 2004
- "Bitzen" Condominium (CD), Mousike Lab, 2004
- "Ruan" Mutek 05 (2xCD), Mutek_Rec, 2005
- "Part #1, Part #2" Radio Worm 59 (CDr), Worm Records, 2005
- "Untitled" Yokomono 02: 55 Lock Grooves (LP), Staalplaat, 2005
- "Monoqin" Minicomp2 (7", Comp, Ltd), Sneakmove, 2007
- "East 18b," Silent Room (DVD, PAL + DVD, NTSC + 2xCD, Comp + Box, Ltd), SK Factory, 2007

=== Film soundtracks ===
An extended nine-minute version of the track "P.Pa" appears in the 2010 installation "Ten Thousand Waves" by Turner-prize-nominated filmmaker Isaac Julien.

FM3 band member Zhang Jian created the soundtrack for the 2016 Zhang Yang film Soul on a String using music from unreleased FM3 material and live performances. The soundtrack was nominated for Best Original Film Score at the 53rd Golden Horse Film Festival and Awards.
