= Watching (song) =

Single by Thompson Twins

from the album Quick Step & Side Kick
- B-side: "Dancersaurus"
- Released: 8 July 1983
- Recorded: 1982
- Genre: Synth-pop
- Length: 3:48
- Label: Arista
- Songwriter(s): Tom Bailey; Alannah Currie; Joe Leeway
- Producer(s): Alex Sadkin and Tom Bailey

Thompson Twins singles chronology
"We Are Detective" (1983)	"Watching" (1983)	"Hold Me Now" (1983)

"Watching" is a 1983 song by the British pop group Thompson Twins. It was released as the fourth and final single from the band's third studio album, Quick Step & Side Kick. The single peaked at number 33 in the UK Singles Chart in July 1983.

== Background and release ==
Shaped picture disc

The original album version of the song featured singer Grace Jones on backing vocals. Jones had also worked extensively with the band's producer Alex Sadkin at his Compass Point Studios in Nassau, Bahamas in the early 1980s, and was there completing her sixth studio album Living My Life (1982) at the same time the Thompson Twins were there recording Quick Step & Side Kick. However, when the song was remixed for release as a single, Jones' vocals were not included.

The B-side of the single, "Dancersaurus", is an instrumental remix of "Watching". The 12" single contains extended remixes of both tracks. In addition to the then-standard 7" and 12" formats, Arista Records opted to release the single as a shaped picture disc, cut into the design of the band's infamous three-heads logo (although slightly larger than a standard 7" single, the picture disc plays the 7" versions of both the A and B sides).

The single became the band's third UK Top 40 hit, peaking at number 33.

== Track listing ==
- 7" Single (TWINS 1)
1. "Watching" – 3:48
2. "Dancersaurus" – 4:40
- 12" Single (TWINS 121)
1. "Watching (You, Watching Me)" – 5:48
2. "Dancersauraus (Even Large Reptiles Have Emotional Problems)" – 5:50
- 7" Shaped Picture Disc (TWISD 1)
1. "Watching" – 3:48
2. "Dancersaurus" – 4:40
