= Sugar Daddy (Thompson Twins song) =

Single by Thompson Twins

from the album Big Trash
- B-side: "Monkey Man"
- Released: 25 September 1989 (UK)
- Genre: Pop rock
- Length: 3:30
- Label: Warner Bros.
- Songwriter(s): Tom Bailey; Alannah Currie
- Producer(s): Tom Bailey; Alannah Currie

Thompson Twins singles chronology
| "In the Name of Love '88" (1988) | "Sugar Daddy" (1989) | "Bombers In The Sky" (1989) |

"Sugar Daddy" is a song by British pop group Thompson Twins, which was released in 1989 as the lead single from their seventh studio album Big Trash. The song was written and produced by Tom Bailey and Alannah Currie. "Sugar Daddy" reached number 28 on the US Billboard Hot 100 (their final Top 40 hit in the US) and number 97 in the UK Singles Chart.

== Background ==
In a 1989 interview on MuchMusic, Bailey described the song as sounding "quite sugary" but added "the message is quite disturbing". He added, "It's about sexual manipulation, affection traded for power, and as with all those sort of power-gain relationships, there's always a sugar coating, so that's why the song is so sugary but the message so bizarre."

== Music video ==
Speaking on MuchMusic, Currie revealed some of the unused sequences of the video, "The video was funny. I wanted to be the angel of death in it, with a black guitar and wings, but I kept getting stuck up there and screaming to get down, so we had to lose some of those shots. And then they built this enormous 12 foot skirt, I wanted to have these men coming out from under my skirt, and they edited that down to make it a bit more acceptable. I wanted to be the original hell's angel, it didn't quite come off. I always get disappointed by our videos."

== Critical reception ==
On its release, Music & Media considered the song "playful and catchy", with "more raunch than their previous material". Phil Cheeseman of Record Mirror commented, "The Twins return to what they're best at - bad pop/rock singles with inane lyrics, those bursts of guitar and pressing the button on the synthesiser marked 'orchestral boom'."

Billboard described "Sugar Daddy" as "refreshing pop" and a "jaunty piece of ear candy". Stephanie Brainerd of Cash Box commented, "This is your average neo-disco synthesized dance mix, and really, it's not a bad one, but from the Thompson Twins? This tune might possibly fare well on the dancefloor, but I don't believe it's their best effort."

In a review of Big Trash, Australian daily newspaper The Age noted the song as one of the album's "superb creations", adding that it was a "pleasant single, though not as amusing as the observant title track".

== Formats ==
7-inch single

1. "Sugar Daddy" - 3:30
2. "Monkey Man" - 3:34

12-inch single

1. "Sugar Daddy (12" Remix)" - 5:40
2. "Sugar Daddy (Sugar House Mix)" - 7:30
3. "Sugar Daddy (Sugar House Dub)" - 5:40

12-inch single (US only)

1. "Sugar Daddy (Sweet N' Low Mix)" - 5:40
2. "Sugar Daddy (Big Daddy's Dub)" - 5:14
3. "Sugar Daddy (7" Remix)" - 3:37
4. "Sugar Daddy (Velvet Rail Mix)" - 7:30
5. "Sugar Daddy (Velvet Rail Dub)" - 5:47
6. "Monkey Man" - 3:33

CD single

1. "Sugar Daddy" - 3:30
2. "Sugar Daddy (12" Remix)" - 5:40
3. "Sugar Daddy (Sugar House Mix)" - 7:30

CD single (US only)

1. "Sugar Daddy (Velvet Rail Mix)" - 7:44
2. "Sugar Daddy (Velvet Rail Edit)" - 4:10
3. "Monkey Man" - 3:36
4. "Sugar Daddy (Sweet N' Low Mix)" - 5:40
5. "Sugar Daddy (7" Remix)" - 3:39

CD single (US promo)

1. "Sugar Daddy (LP Version)" - 3:30
2. "Sugar Daddy (7" Remix)" - 3:37
3. "Sugar Daddy (Velvet Rail Mix)" - 7:30
4. "Sugar Daddy (Sweet N' Low Mix)" - 5:40

== Personnel ==
- Remix Engineer – Goh Hotoda
- Editor, Producer, Additional Production, Remixer – Shep Pettibone
- Editor – Tony Shimkin
- Engineer, Mixer – Keith Fernley
- Mixer – Phil Thornalley
- Producer, Writer, Vocals – Alannah Currie, Tom Bailey
- Artwork Design – Satori
- Front Cover Artwork – Tilby
- Photography – Holt

== Charts ==
| Chart (1989) | Peak position |
|---|---|
| Australia (ARIA Charts) | 155 |
| Canadian Singles Chart | 38 |
| UK Singles Chart | 97 |
| US Billboard Dance/Club Play | 2 |
| US Billboard Hot 100 | 28 |
| US Billboard Hot Dance Music Sales | 28 |
| US Billboard Modern Rock Tracks | 16 |
