= Big Trash =

Album by Thompson Twins

Studio album by Thompson Twins
- Released: 26 September 1989
- Studio: Maison Rouge and RAK Studios (London, UK).
- Genre: Alternative rock; post-punk
- Length: 41:09
- Label: Warner Bros.
- Producer: Tom Bailey; Alannah Currie; Steve Lillywhite

Thompson Twins chronology
The Best of Thompson Twins: Greatest Mixes (1988)	Big Trash (1989)	Queer (1991)

Singles from Big Trash
- 1. "Sugar Daddy" Released: September 1989; 2. "Bombers in the Sky" Released: 1990

Big Trash is the seventh studio album by the English pop group the Thompson Twins, released on 26 September 1989 by Warner Brothers/Red Eye. It was produced by Tom Bailey and Alannah Currie, with two tracks produced by Steve Lillywhite.

Big Trash yielded two singles; "Sugar Daddy" reached No. 28 on the US Billboard Hot 100 and No. 97 in the UK, while "Bombers in the Sky" was a commercial failure. Big Trash reached No. 143 on the Billboard 200, but did not chart in the UK.

== Background ==
Big Trash was the duo's first release for Warner Brothers. Currie told MuchMusic in 1989: "Warner Brothers came to us and said "Here's a pile of money, go make the sort of record you really want to make", which is every musician's dream. So we made Big Trash".

Blondie singer Deborah Harry contributed spoken-word vocals to "Queen of the U.S.A.", recorded by Bailey over a transatlantic telephone connection. Recalling the Big Trash period of the Thompson Twins' career, Bailey told Rhino in 2014: "It was great fun. It was a new era and we were trying out some new ideas as well as a new way of working. We saw that video and being studio-oriented was the way of the future."

== Critical reception ==
Professional ratings
Review scores
Source	Rating
AllMusic	3/5 stars
Robert Christgau	B+
New Straits Times	2/5 stars
The Rolling Stone Album Guide	3.5/5 stars
Telegram & Gazette	2/5 stars

Upon release, Billboard noted the duo hadn't "produced anything quite so lively since its hit-making heyday". They added that "Sugar Daddy" "cheerfully borrows from earlier tunes, while the rest shows remarkable growth and depth". Australian daily newspaper The Age wrote: "The tracks are short, Alannah Currie's gone easy on the percussion for a change and Tom Bailey has decided to start playing around with his vocal a bit more. This work brings up some superb creations: "Queen of the USA", "Salvador Dalí's Car" and "Sugar Daddy" - a pleasant single, though not as amusing as the observant title track." The European Music & Media considered the album to "lack the humour that marked their earlier work but makes up for that with some sharp, catchy songs and a tight, no-nonsense production".

Malaysia newspaper New Straits Times felt the album "serve[s] up the kind of slick, upbeat music with a busy percussive attack that characterised much of their previous efforts", adding: "This 11-cut set features the usual dispassionate vocals and banal lines but as least the rhythms have some kick." Telegram & Gazette felt the album was "just a bit too serious" and "an attempt to change their squeaky-clean but catchy pop image by tackling current and controversial issues". They concluded: "The band oversteps its pop star boundaries just long enough to create a record that is as controversial as a donut."

Stephen Thomas Erlewine of AllMusic retrospectively wrote: "Big Trash was a successful attempt to add a stronger rhythmic sensibility to The Thompson Twins' sound, but the album failed to produce any hit bigger than the number 28 "Sugar Daddy," although there were several other strong numbers on the record." Robert Christgau gave the album a B+, stating: "No one cares, but this is their best by miles. The singing is as characterless as ever, but at last their brains show." Ira Robbins of Trouser Press considered the album "an uninspired waste of time and plastic", with "a lame pairing of grade-school rhymes and bland music that is, at best, self-imitative".

== Track listing ==
All tracks are written by Tom Bailey and Alannah Currie.

No.	Title	Length
1.	"Sugar Daddy"	3:31
2.	"Queen of the U.S.A."	3:44
3.	"Bombers in the Sky"	3:56
4.	"This Girl's on Fire"	3:10
5.	"T.V. On"	3:26
6.	"Big Trash"	3:09
7.	"Salvador Dali's Car"	4:20
8.	"Rock This Boat"	3:07
9.	"Dirty Summer's Day"	4:28
10.	"Love Jungle"	4:10
11.	"Wild"	3:58

== Personnel ==
Thompson Twins

- Tom Bailey
- Alannah Currie

Additional personnel

- Felicia Collins – rhythm guitar (1)
- Keith Fernley – rhythm guitar (1, 3), harmonica (10)
- Reginald Hastings – slide guitar (3)
- David Palmer – drums (4, 11)
- Deborah Harry – phone call voice (2)
- Bob Marshall – auctioneering voice (6)

== Production ==
- Tom Bailey – producer (1–3, 5–10)
- Alannah Currie – producer (1–3, 5–10), art direction
- Steve Lillywhite – producer (4, 11)
- Keith Fernley – engineer, mixing (1–10)
- Phil Thornalley – mixing (1–4, 7, 8)
- Chris Dickie – engineer (4, 11)
- Gordon Bonner – assistant engineer
- Danny Duncan – assistant engineer
- Anne Tilby – art direction
- Jonathan Green – art direction assistant
- Kevin Davies – photography
- Icon, London and Los Angeles – design
- Gary Kurfirst – management

== Chart performance ==
Chart (1989)	Peak position
US Billboard 200	143
