= Matthew Seligman =

British musician (1955–2020)

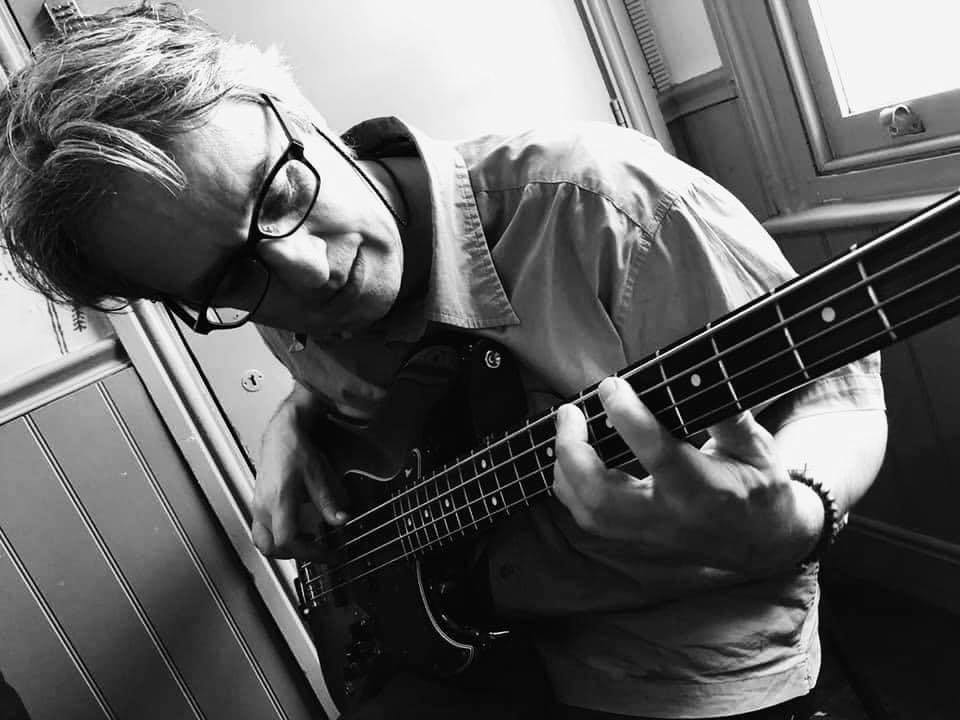
- Seligman in 2018

Background information
- Born: 14 July 1955; Pentageia, British Cyprus
- Origin: Wimbledon, London, England
- Died: 17 April 2020 (aged 64) London, England
- Genres: New wave; post-punk; synth-pop; alternative rock
- Occupations: Musician; lawyer
- Instrument: Bass guitar
- Formerly of: The Camera Club; The Fallout Club; The Soft Boys; Thompson Twins

Matthew Seligman (14 July 1955 – 17 April 2020) was an English bassist, best known for his association with the new wave music scene of the 1980s. He was a member of the Soft Boys and the Thompson Twins, and was a sideman for Thomas Dolby. He was also a member of Bruce Woolley and the Camera Club and the Dolphin Brothers, and backed David Bowie during his performance at Live Aid in 1985.

== Biography ==
=== Early life ===
Seligman was born in British Cyprus to mariner and writer Adrian Seligman and his wife Rosemary. His family moved to the UK eight months after his birth, settling in Wimbledon. He attended the University of Cambridge, where he earned a double first in History. Influenced by Paul McCartney, Free’s Andy Fraser, and Tina Weymouth of Talking Heads, he learned bass.

=== Career ===
Seligman was a founding member of Bruce Woolley and the Camera Club, which also included his friend Thomas Dolby. He played on the band's 1979 debut studio album English Garden, which featured a version of "Video Killed the Radio Star", which Woolley had co-written with the Buggles. After leaving the Camera Club in 1979, Seligman joined the Soft Boys, replacing founding bassist Andy Metcalfe, and performed on their second studio album Underwater Moonlight. The Soft Boys broke up in 1981, and Seligman next formed the short-lived band the Fallout Club, which also included Dolby. The Fallout Club disbanded after two singles and Seligman joined the Thompson Twins, appearing on their 1982 studio album Set and its American counterpart In the Name of Love. Seligman was fired from the Thompson Twins later that year when the band decided to reduce itself to a trio. Seligman then joined Dolby's solo group, and played bass on his studio albums The Golden Age of Wireless (1982) and The Flat Earth (1984) and the hit single "She Blinded Me With Science".

In addition to his work with Dolby throughout the 1980s, Seligman was also a member of the bands Local Heroes SW9, the Dolphin Brothers, and most notably the Radio Science Orchestra (alongside Camera Club frontman Bruce Woolley). He also played bass on the first two solo studio albums by his former Soft Boys bandmate Robyn Hitchcock.

As a session musician, Seligman performed on studio albums and singles by Stereo MC's, the Waterboys, Sinéad O'Connor, Transvision Vamp, Morrissey, Nan Vernon, Tori Amos, Kimberley Rew and Alex Chilton. In 1985, Seligman and Dolby appeared as part of David Bowie's backup band at Live Aid. In 1986, Seligman played bass guitar on Bowie's soundtrack album Labyrinth and his single "Absolute Beginners".

In 2002, Seligman played at the Shanghai Festival with Snail, along with Chris Bell and Jon Klein, and in 2007 began working with the Fire Escapes. In 2011 to 2012 he contributed to Thomas Dolby's A Map of the Floating City also appearing with him on tours of the UK and northern Europe, at the Blue Note in Tokyo in February 2012 and at the Latitude Festival, Suffolk, England in July 2012. In 2014, with fellow Fire Escapers Mark Headley and Lucy Pullin, he completed the Magical Creatures' Wishing Machine collection, also appearing live with them at a summer 2016 William S. Burroughs-inspired launch party in Brighton, England.

In 2017, Seligman, along with Jon Klein and Australian musicians Paul Cartwright and Paul Smyth released the album Monoplane under the name Neon Sisters. The album features both Seligman and Cartwright on basses, Klein on guitar, Smyth on keyboards with guest appearances by Bruce Woolley and David Bridie.

Seligman played a black Fender Jazz Bass as his first choice instrument. In addition he used an Ibanez with a C-ducer contact mic built into the back of the neck, close to the neck/body junction, for his fretless work primarily with Thomas Dolby, but also Peter Murphy and in the ambient collection Sendai, recorded with Japan/Hong Kong–based musician Jan Linton for the March 2011 Tōhoku earthquake relief fund, and released by Entropy Records in 2012, and re-released in 2020 with extra material after Seligman's death.

=== Legal career ===
Following his music career, Seligman trained as a barrister and was called to the bar in 1994. Early in his legal career, he represented the captain of the Marchioness during the public inquiry into the 1989 disaster. He later specialized in mental health and human rights law, often representing vulnerable clients in First-tier Tribunals.

=== Personal life ===
Seligman was a lifelong Fulham F.C. fan. After a lifetime in the UK, he moved to Sendai in Japan in early 2005 and subsequently, after a four-year spell back in the UK, returned there in July 2012. He practiced as a human rights solicitor in London and continued to play music until his death. He left behind two children.

=== Death ===
In early April 2020, Dolby reported that Seligman had been placed in an induced coma in St George's Hospital, London, after being diagnosed with COVID-19. On 17 April, Dolby posted on his Facebook page that he had suffered a "catastrophic haemorrhagic stroke" from which he was not expected to recover; Seligman died later that day, aged 64. Shortly after his death, the Radio Science Orchestra released a track titled "The Brightest Star", a jazz-fusion piece that Seligman recorded a few years ago with the group before his death. It was then given a full release on an album titled Memories of the Future.

== Discography ==
Seligman performed on the following albums, either as an official band member or a sideman:

Local Heroes S.W.9 – Drip Dry Zone

with Bruce Woolley and the Camera Club

- English Garden (1979)

with the Soft Boys

- Underwater Moonlight (1980)
- Nextdoorland (2003)

with Robyn Hitchcock

- Black Snake Diamond Röle (1981)
- Groovy Decay (1982)
- Invisible Hitchcock (1986)

with Thompson Twins

- Set (1982)
- In the Name of Love (1982)

with Thomas Dolby

- The Golden Age of Wireless (1982)
- Blinded by Science (1983)
- The Flat Earth (1984)
- Astronauts & Heretics (1992)
- A Map of the Floating City (2011)

with the Dolphin Brothers

- Catch the Fall (1987)

with Jan Linton

- Sendai 仙台 (2012)
- Sendai 仙台 Special Extended edition (2020)
- King Hong (2020)

with Snail

- Psychodelicate (2001)
- Last Dog in Space (2002)

with Ajantamusic

- Above the Cloudline (2009)
- The Secret Door (2013)

with the Fallout Club

- "Dream Soldiers" (single) (1981)
- Dangerous Friends (2017)

with Magical Creatures

- Wishing Machine (2016)

with Neon Sisters

- Monoplane (2017)

As a sideman

- Kimberley Rew – The Bible of Bop (1982)
- Alex Chilton – Live in London (1982)
- The Waterboys – This Is the Sea (1985)
- David Bowie – Labyrinth (1986)
- David Bowie – "Absolute Beginners" (1986)
- Peter Murphy – Love Hysteria (1988)
- Transvision Vamp – Pop Art (1988)
- Morrissey – "Ouija Board, Ouija Board" (1989)
- Stereo MC's – Supernatural (1990)
- Sam Brown – April Moon (1990)
- Tori Amos – Little Earthquakes (1992)
- Stereo MC's – Connected (1992)
- Sinéad O'Connor – Universal Mother (1994)
- Nan Vernon – Manta Ray (1994)
- The Popguns – Lovejunky (1995)
- Jan Linton – I Actually Come Back (2016)
