= Lies (Thompson Twins song) =

1982 single by Thompson Twins

Single by Thompson Twins

from the album Quick Step & Side Kick
- B-side: "Beach Culture"
- Released: 8 October 1982
- Genre: Synth-pop; new wave
- Length: 3:08
- Label: Arista
- Songwriters: Tom Bailey; Alannah Currie; Joe Leeway
- Producer: Alex Sadkin

Thompson Twins singles chronology
"Runaway" (1982)	"Lies" (1982)	"Love On Your Side" (1983)

Music video
- "Lies" on YouTube

"Lies" is a song by the English pop band Thompson Twins. It was released as the first single from their third studio album Quick Step & Side Kick (Side Kicks in the US), and the song peaked at number 67 on the UK singles chart. The single fared better in the United States, where it peaked at number 30 on the Billboard Hot 100 chart in the spring of 1983. Along with the B-side track "Beach Culture", "Lies" also spent two weeks at number one on the American dance chart in January 1983, becoming the band's second number one on this chart ("In the Name of Love" had spent five weeks atop this chart in 1982).

== Pop culture use ==
“Lies" was featured in the animated television series Regular Show. The song plays during the season one episode "Grilled Cheese Deluxe" in a montage highlighting Mordecai and Rigby's escalating lies after they falsely claim to be astronauts, the episode was released in 2010.

== Content ==
Lead vocalist Tom Bailey said, "We [he and Alannah Currie] were just trying to be wacky and a little bit crazy and come up with an idea that we could be irreverent about. The chorus - that kind of catcall chorus, singing, 'lies, lies, lies' - it's the kind of thing you might see in a playground, a school, where someone's calling out like that. But we tried to make it more universal and apply it to bigger issues in the world."

== Music video ==
The music video was directed by Maurice Phillips and received airplay on MTV and other video programs. Three pairs of feet jut from the blankets at the foot end of an oversized bed, bouncing back and forth to the rhythm of the song, as a variety of sights pass in a room similar to Dr David Bowman's bedroom in 2001: A Space Odyssey (1968) or a Magritte painting. The end of the video, in which a nurse pulls a privacy screen into place and leans toward the camera with thermometer in hand, establishes that the bed's occupants are patients in a hospital.

== Track listing ==
- 12-inch single (ARIST 12486, ARIST 12 486)
1. "(Bigger & Better) Lies" – 6:35
2. "(Long) Beach Culture" – 6:48
- 7-inch single (ARIST 486)
1. "Lies" – 3:10
2. "Beach Culture" – 3:55

== Charts ==
Chart (1982–1983)	Peak; position
Australia (Kent Music Report)	27
New Zealand (Recorded Music NZ)	6
UK Singles (Official Charts)	67
US Billboard Hot 100	30
US Dance Club Songs (Billboard) with "Beach Culture"	1
US Cash Box Top 100	31

== See also ==
- List of Billboard number-one dance/disco singles of 1983
