= In the Name of Love (Thompson Twins song) =

1982 single by Thompson Twins

Single by Thompson Twins

from the album Set
- Released: January 1982
- Genre: Synth-pop; new wave; electronic rock
- Length: 3:18 (7"); 5:39 (12")
- Label: Arista
- Songwriter(s): Tom Bailey
- Producer(s): Steve Lillywhite

Thompson Twins singles chronology
"Politics" (1981)	"In the Name of Love" (1982)	"Runaway" (1982)

Official audio
- "In the Name of Love" on YouTube

"In the Name of Love" is a 1982 single written and performed by the English pop band Thompson Twins, at the time a septet (Tom Bailey, Alannah Currie, Joe Leeway, John Roog, Chris Bell, Peter Dodd, and Matthew Seligman). It was the first of twelve entries on the Billboard Dance chart for the group.

"In the Name of Love" went to number one on the Dance music chart and stayed there for five weeks, and spent a total of twenty-one weeks on the chart. It peaked at number sixty-nine on the Billboard R&B chart.

== Critical reception ==
Upon its release, the singer Thereza Bazar of the pop duo Dollar, as a guest reviewer for Flexipop, believed "In the Name of Love" would "go down well at one of the trendier discos such as Heaven or Le Beat Route, where people dance to the hits of the future". She continued, "The Thompson Twins are on the verge of breaking into the big time. This song should help them on their way." In the US, Record World called it a "driving electronic rocker" with "frantic guitars, keyboards and percussion."

== 1988 remix ==
"In the Name of Love '88"

Single by Thompson Twins

from the album The Best of Thompson Twins: Greatest Mixes
- B-side: "In the Name of Love" (Original) "Passion Planet" (12" only)
- Released: 1988
- Genre: Synth-pop; new wave
- Length: 3:30
- Label: Arista
- Songwriter(s): Tom Bailey; Alannah Currie; Joe Leeway; John Roog; Chris Bell; Peter Dodd; Matthew Seligman
- Producer(s): Steve Lillywhite; Shep Pettibone

Thompson Twins singles chronology
"Long Goodbye" (1987)	"In the Name of Love '88" (1988)	"Sugar Daddy" (1989)

The track was remixed in 1988 by the American club DJ Shep Pettibone and included as "In the Name of Love '88" on the Greatest Mixes compilation album. The single peaked at No. 46 in the UK, spending 3 weeks on the chart. The single fared better in America, where it peaked at No. 1 on the US Billboard Dance/Club Play chart.

== Track listings ==
7" single (1982)

1. "In the Name of Love"
2. "In the Beginning"

12" single (1982)

1. "In the Name of Love" (12" Dance Extension)
2. "In the Beginning"
3. "Coastline"

7" single

1. "In the Name of Love '88" – 3:30
2. "In the Name of Love" (Original) – 3:18

12" single

1. "In the Name of Love '88" (Railroad Mix) – 6:40
2. "In the Name of Love '88" (Railroad Dub) – 5:48
3. "In the Name of Love" (Original) – 3:18

12" single (US)

1. "In the Name of Love '88" (Railroad Mix) – 6:40
2. "In the Name of Love '88" (Railroad Dub) – 5:48
3. "In the Name of Love '88" (Single Mix) – 3:30
4. "In the Name of Love '88" (Extended Mix) – 5:18
5. "In the Name of Love '88" (Dub) – 6:20
6. "Passion Planet" – 3:42

CD single

1. "In the Name of Love '88" (Single Mix) – 3:30
2. "In the Name of Love '88" (Railroad Mix) – 6:40
3. "In the Name of Love '88" (Railroad Dub) – 5:48
4. "In the Name of Love '88" (Original) – 3:18

== Personnel ==
- Producer – Steve Lillywhite
- Additional production by Shep Pettibone for Mastermix Productions
- Mixed by Shep Pettibone and Steve Peck
- Digitally edited by Tuta Aquino

== Charts ==
Chart (1982)	Peak position
Belgium (Ultratop 50 Flanders)	21
Netherlands (Single Top 100)	44
UK Record Business Top 100 Singles	90

Chart (1988)	Peak position
UK singles chart	46
US Billboard Dance/Club Play Chart	1

== See also ==
- List of Billboard number-one dance singles of 1982
- List of Billboard number-one dance singles of 1988
