= Thompson Twins =

British pop band

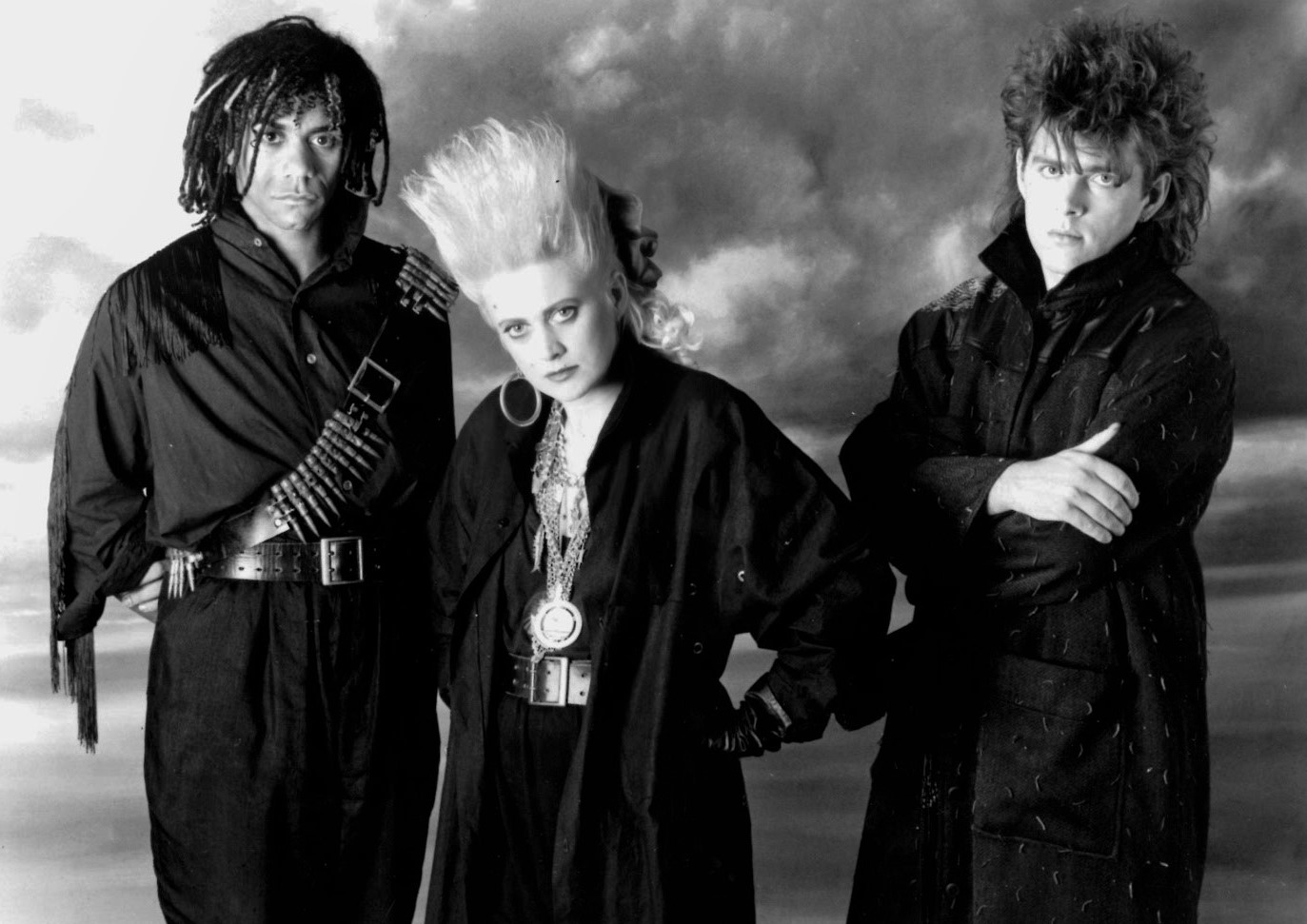
- Thompson Twins in 1985, left to right: Joe Leeway, Alannah Currie and Tom Bailey.

Background information
- Origin: Sheffield, South Yorkshire, England
- Genres: Pop; new wave; synth-pop; post-punk; alternative rock
- Years active: 1977–1993
- Labels: Dirty Discs; T; Arista; Warner Bros.
- Spinoffs: Babble; International Observer
- Past members: Tom Bailey; Alannah Currie; Joe Leeway; Chris Bell; Pete Dodd; Andrew Edge; Jon Podgorski; John Roog; Matthew Seligman; Jane Shorter; Michael White

Thompson Twins were an English pop band, formed in 1977 in Sheffield. Initially a new wave group, they switched to a more mainstream pop sound and achieved considerable popularity during the early and mid-1980s, scoring a string of hits in the United Kingdom, the United States, and around the world. In 1993, they changed their name to Babble, to reflect their change in music from pop to dub-influenced chill-out. They continued as Babble until 1996, at which point the group permanently broke up.

The band's name was based on the two bumbling detectives Thomson and Thompson (who are close doubles, not twins) in the English-language version of The Adventures of Tintin (Les aventures de Tintin). At various stages they had up to seven members, but their best known line-up was as a trio from 1982 to 1986. The band became a prominent act in the US during the Second British Invasion, and in 1985 performed at Live Aid in Philadelphia, where they were joined on stage by Madonna.

== Career ==
=== Early days ===
In 1977, the original Thompson Twins line-up consisted of Tom Bailey on bass guitar and vocals, Pete Dodd on guitar and vocals, John Roog on guitar, and Jon Podgorski (known as "Pod") on drums.

Arriving in London with little money, they lived as squatters in Lillieshall Road, Clapham. Future Thompson Twins member Alannah Currie lived in another squat in the same street, which is how she met Bailey. Their roadie at that time was John Hade, who lived in the same house, and who later became their manager.

As Podgorski had decided to stay in the north, the group auditioned for drummers at the Point Studio in Victoria, London. Andrew Edge joined them on drums for 18 months, and went on to join Savage Progress, who later toured with the Thompson Twins as the support act on the band's 1984 UK tour.

In 1980, the band (now consisting of Bailey, Dodd, Roog and drummer Chris Bell, who had replaced Edge the previous year) released their first single, "Squares and Triangles", on their own Dirty Discs label. A follow-up single, "She's in Love with Mystery", was issued later that year.

=== Line-up changes ===
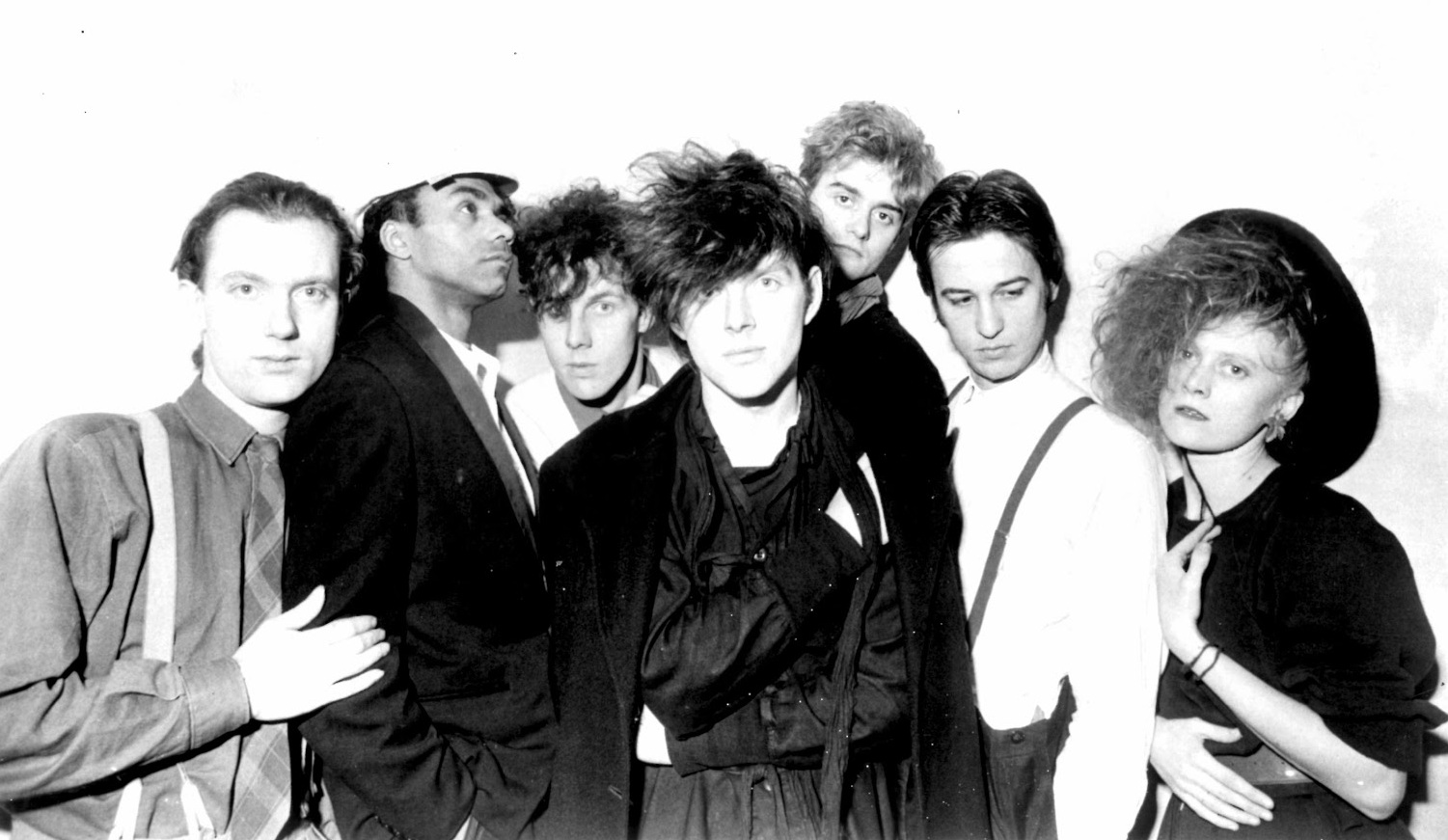
Thompson Twins, c. 1982

In 1981, the line-up became Bailey, Dodd, Roog, Bell and two new members: former band roadie Joe Leeway on congas and percussion, and Jane Shorter on saxophone. This line-up recorded the debut Thompson Twins studio album A Product Of... (Participation), documented in the film Listen to London (1981). Currie, who had been associated with the band for a few years, played and sang on their debut studio album, but was not yet a full member.

After their debut studio album, the band's line-up shifted yet again. Saxophonist Jane Shorter left and was replaced by Currie (who also played percussion), and bassist Matthew Seligman, a former member of the Soft Boys and the Fallout Club, joined; leaving Bailey to switch to keyboards, with Leeway starting to handle lead vocals on some tracks.

The band signed a recording contract with Arista Records and released their second studio album Set. Thomas Dolby played some keyboards on Set and some live gigs, for Bailey at that time had little experience with synthesizers. Set contained the single "In the Name of Love", sung and largely written by Bailey. It became a No. 1 dance club hit in the US, and an album titled In the Name of Love (consisting mainly of tracks from Set, with two others from A Product Of... (Participation)) was released in the US to capitalize on the song's popularity. It entered the US Billboard 200.

=== Trio ===
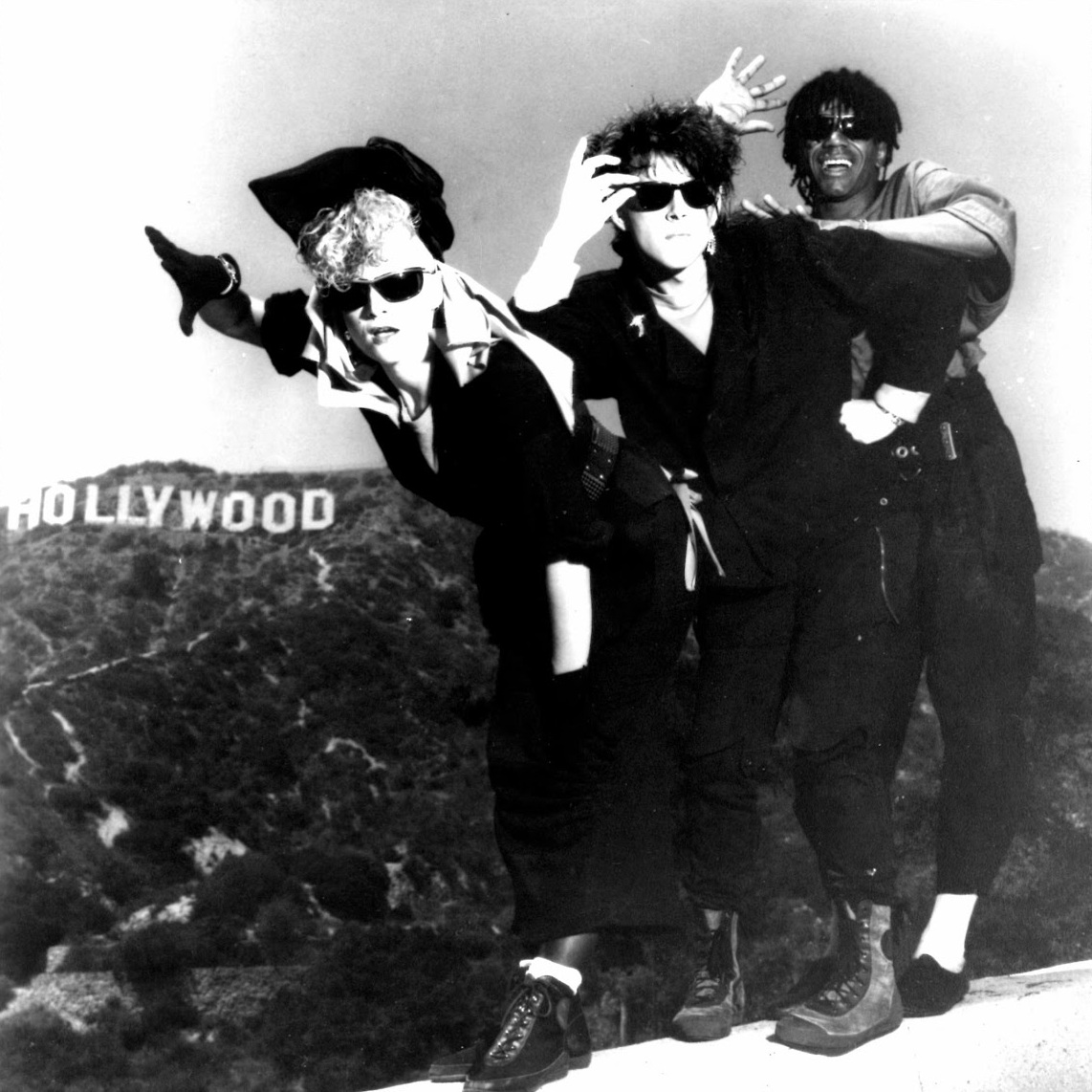
Thompson Twins in a publicity shot, c. 1984

After the success of "In the Name of Love", Bailey, Currie and Leeway, wanting to pursue the single's different sound, toyed with the idea of starting a new band on the side, which they planned to call 'The Bermuda Triangle'. When "In the Name of Love" (and its parent studio album Set) failed to make a substantial impact in the UK record charts, this plan was abandoned. However, at the same time, manager Hade convinced Bailey, Leeway and Currie to downsize the Thompson Twins to a core of the three in April 1982. Accordingly, the other four members of the band were notified that the band was breaking up; they were each paid £500 and were allowed to keep their instruments and equipment in exchange for an understanding not to perform together under the name "Thompson Twins".

The remaining Thompson Twins, who had not in fact broken up, decided to go abroad to free themselves of any UK influence, as well as to combine the songwriting for their first studio album as a trio with a long holiday. They first went to Egypt and then to the Bahamas, where they recorded at Compass Point Studios in Nassau with record producer Alex Sadkin.

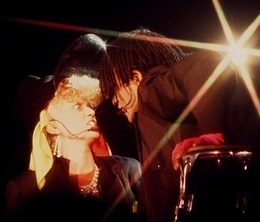
Alannah Currie (left) and Joe Leeway (right), performing in 1984

Bailey commented on the band's reduction to a trio in a 1983 interview: "When we reformed the band, we were making a statement. We weren't going to be a rock 'n' roll band, we weren't going to have a guitar. We were going to move on. You know, Lou Reed said whenever he played live he ended up going back to heroin music. There are old associations, associations we don't want because they don't reflect the way we feel today. ... Right now, technology is what's important, and that's what our music tries to reflect."

=== International success ===
The band broke into the UK Singles Chart and the US Billboard Hot 100 chart at the beginning of 1983 with "Lies" and "Love On Your Side", which became the band's first UK Top 10 single. They then released their third studio album, Quick Step & Side Kick (called simply Side Kicks in the US), which peaked at number 2 in the UK and was later certified platinum. Further singles followed with "We Are Detective" (another Top 10 UK hit) and "Watching" (UK No. 33). All three band members worked collectively on songwriting with Currie providing lyrics and Bailey melodies. In addition Leeway was responsible for stagecraft, Currie for music videos and imagery and Bailey for musicianship and production. During 1983, the band had the opening spot on the Police's concert tour in the US.

Following the band's reduction to a trio, designer Andie Airfix created a logo consisting of outlines of their heads and respective hairstyles. It was voted fourth best out of 13 candidates by Classic Pop Magazine in May 2022.

"Hold Me Now" was released in late 1983. The song was an international chart success, peaking at No. 4 in the UK where it became the band's biggest seller earning a gold disc, and reached No. 3 in the US in the spring of 1984 becoming their biggest American hit.

The band's fourth studio album, Into the Gap, was released in February 1984 and became one of the year's biggest sellers, selling five million copies worldwide. It topped the UK Albums Chart and was later certified double platinum there. Further hit singles from the album followed with "Doctor! Doctor!" (UK No. 3) and "You Take Me Up" (UK No. 2, their highest UK singles chart placing and which earned a silver disc). Other singles included a new version of the album track "Sister of Mercy" (UK No. 11), and "The Gap" (though this was not released in the UK). The band embarked on a world tour in support of the album, which had also made the US top ten.

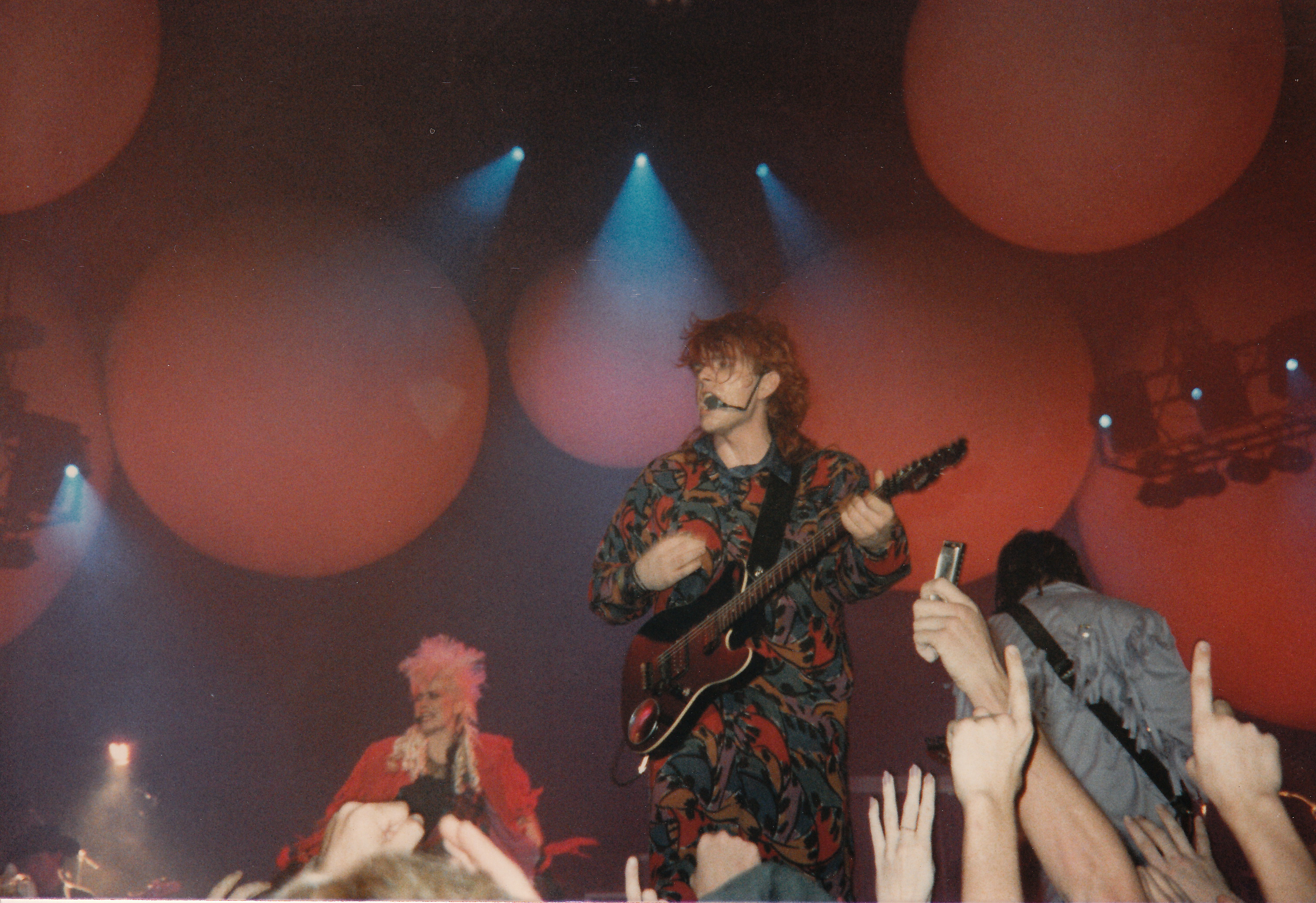
Thompson Twins performing in Lakeland, Florida, 1986.

A brand new single, "Lay Your Hands on Me", was released in the UK in late 1984 and reached No. 13 on the UK Singles Chart. Following this, the band parted company with their producer Alex Sadkin and opted to produce their fifth studio album, Here's to Future Days, by themselves in Paris. However, in March 1985, while promoting their new single "Roll Over" and the forthcoming studio album, Bailey collapsed in his London hotel room from nervous exhaustion. The "Roll Over" single was then cancelled at the last minute and the new album postponed. Though the band had chosen to produce themselves, the postponement caused them to rethink the project and producer Nile Rodgers was subsequently called in to rework the album with them. The album was eventually released in September 1985, reaching the UK Top 5 and US Top 20, though failed to come close to the success of Into the Gap. It was preceded by the single "Don't Mess with Doctor Dream" (UK No. 15) and followed by the single "King for a Day", which peaked at No. 22 in the UK, but reached No. 8 on the US chart. Other singles included a new US version of "Lay Your Hands on Me" (US No. 6), and a cover of the Beatles' 1968 hit "Revolution", which failed to make the UK Top 40.

Prior to the album's release, the Thompson Twins performed on the American leg of Live Aid in July 1985 and were joined onstage by Madonna. The planned summer 1985 tour of the UK (and a headlining appearance at the Glastonbury Festival) had to be cancelled due to Bailey's health problems (fans with tickets received a free live album as compensation), though international dates were rescheduled and the latter half of 1985 saw sell out tours for the band in the US and Japan. A second planned tour of the UK in 1985 was also scrapped due to the promoter declaring bankruptcy.

=== Duo ===
Leeway left the band in 1986, and the remaining duo of Bailey and Currie carried on making music for another seven years. The act's first release as a duo was the North America-only single "Nothing in Common", released in July 1986. It peaked at No. 54 in the US, and No. 68 in Canada.

1987 saw the release of their sixth studio album Close to the Bone and the single "Get That Love", which climbed to No. 31 in the US but only reached No. 66 in the UK. The album was a commercial flop. It spent only one week on the UK Albums Chart at No. 90 and yielded no further chart singles.

"In the Name of Love" was given a new lease on life in 1988, after a remix by Shep Pettibone made the Top 50 in the UK. 1989 saw the release of another studio album, Big Trash, and a new recording contract with Warner Bros. Records. The single "Sugar Daddy" peaked at No. 28 in the US and would be their last brush with mainstream chart success. 1991's Queer would be the band's swansong, and was supported by various techno-inspired singles under the moniker of Feedback Max (in the UK) to disguise the identity of the band to club DJs. The single "Come Inside" reached No. 7 in the US Dance Chart and No. 1 in the UK Dance Chart.

Prior to this, Bailey and Currie (who were now a couple) had their first child together in 1988, and in the following years they spent a lot of time writing material for other artists including the hit single "I Want That Man" for Deborah Harry of Blondie in 1989. In 1990, Bailey and Currie contributed the song "Who Wants to Be a Millionaire?" to the Cole Porter tribute album Red Hot + Blue produced by the Red Hot Organization. In 1991, Bailey and Currie were married in Las Vegas, US and the following year moved to New Zealand. In 1992, the Thompson Twins contributed the song "Play with Me" to the soundtrack of the Ralph Bakshi film Cool World; Bailey alone contributed a second track, "Industry and Seduction". The following year, the duo teamed up with engineer Keith Fernley and changed their band name to Babble. They released two studio albums: The Stone (1993) and Ether (1996).

Thompson Twins declined to follow the example of many of their contemporaries and reform in order to tie in with a trend of nostalgia for the 1980s, although Bailey, Currie and Leeway appeared together on the UK Channel 4 show Top Ten Electro Bands in 2001. Thompson Twins were placed ninth.

== After the Twins ==
Babble released two studio albums, The Stone (1993) and Ether (1996), with songs featured in the films Coneheads (1993) and With Honors (1994).

In the mid-1990s, Currie gave up the music business to set up her own glass-casting studio in Auckland and concentrated on raising her two children. In 2001, she founded and ran the anti-genetic engineering group called MAdGE (Mothers Against Genetic Engineering in food and the environment), and networked thousands of women across New Zealand in a resistance movement, aimed at keeping the biotech industry from using New Zealand as an experimental playground. Currie described this group as a "rapidly growing network of politically non-aligned women who are actively resisting the use of genetically-engineered material in our food and on our land". During that time she designed a billboard to spark a debate on the ethics of genetically modifying cows with human genes to produce a new milk. The billboard, featuring a young woman with four breasts hooked up to a milking machine, caused huge controversy but won several international art awards. Bailey and Currie divorced in 2003, and both left New Zealand to live separately in the UK. Currie later married Jimmy Cauty (formerly of the KLF) and now lives and works in London. She is a visual artist who works under the pseudonym "Miss Pokeno", as well as the Armchair Destructivists and The Sisters of Perpetual Resistance. As well as several solo shows in London her work has also been exhibited at both the Guildhall Art Gallery and the Geffrye Museum.

In 1999, Bailey produced and played keyboards on the studio album Mix by the New Zealand band Stellar, and won the Producer of the Year Award at the 2000 New Zealand Music Awards. He has also arranged soundtracks and has provided instrumental music for several films. He continues to make music under the moniker International Observer and has released the studio albums Seen (2001), All Played Out (2005), and Felt (2009). He also performs with the Holiwater group from India. He began performing live again as Thompson Twins' Tom Bailey in 2014 and has since toured the UK, North America and Japan. In 2016 he released his debut solo single, "Come So Far". In 2018 Bailey released his debut solo studio album titled Science Fiction.

After leaving the Thompson Twins in 1986, Leeway briefly dabbled in acting and attempted a solo music career, though neither were successful. As of 2006, he resides in Los Angeles, and works in the field of hypnotherapy. He is on the staff at the Hypnosis Motivation Institute (HMI) in the Los Angeles district of Tarzana, and is also a certified trainer in neuro-linguistic programming.

The earlier members went on to do other things:

- Dodd and Roog formed a band called Big View (with Edge on drums) and recorded a single called, "August Grass", which was released on Point Records (owned by Merton, the Thompson Twins publisher) in 1982. Dodd is now living back in Chesterfield working as a freelance journalist – and has released his own History of Rock album billed as Peter & the Wolves. Dodd still sees Podgorski on a regular basis. Dodd and John Roog play in a band called "The Flow"
- Roog lives in Chesterfield, and was previously in a senior position in Tower Hamlets Adult Services, and the London Borough of Lambeth, until his retirement in 2011. He now plays in a band with Pete Dodd called the Flow.
- Seligman worked for a law firm in London and has played in the Soft Boys reunions as well as releasing his own studio albums. He had moved to Sendai, Japan with his Japanese wife and their daughter and, in 2009, contributed to the Thomas Dolby studio album A Map of the Floating City. In 2012, he collaborated with Jan Linton on the CD Sendai, a fundraiser for reconstruction after the 11 March Tōhoku earthquake. Seligman died in 2020 of complications from COVID-19.
- Bell moved from London to Bath, and played in or for Spear of Destiny, Gene Loves Jezebel and Hugh Cornwell of the Stranglers.
- Booth helped Chinese music artists in production and development. She is now a consultant and executive producer at RIBA since 9 February 2022.

== Tom Bailey solo shows ==
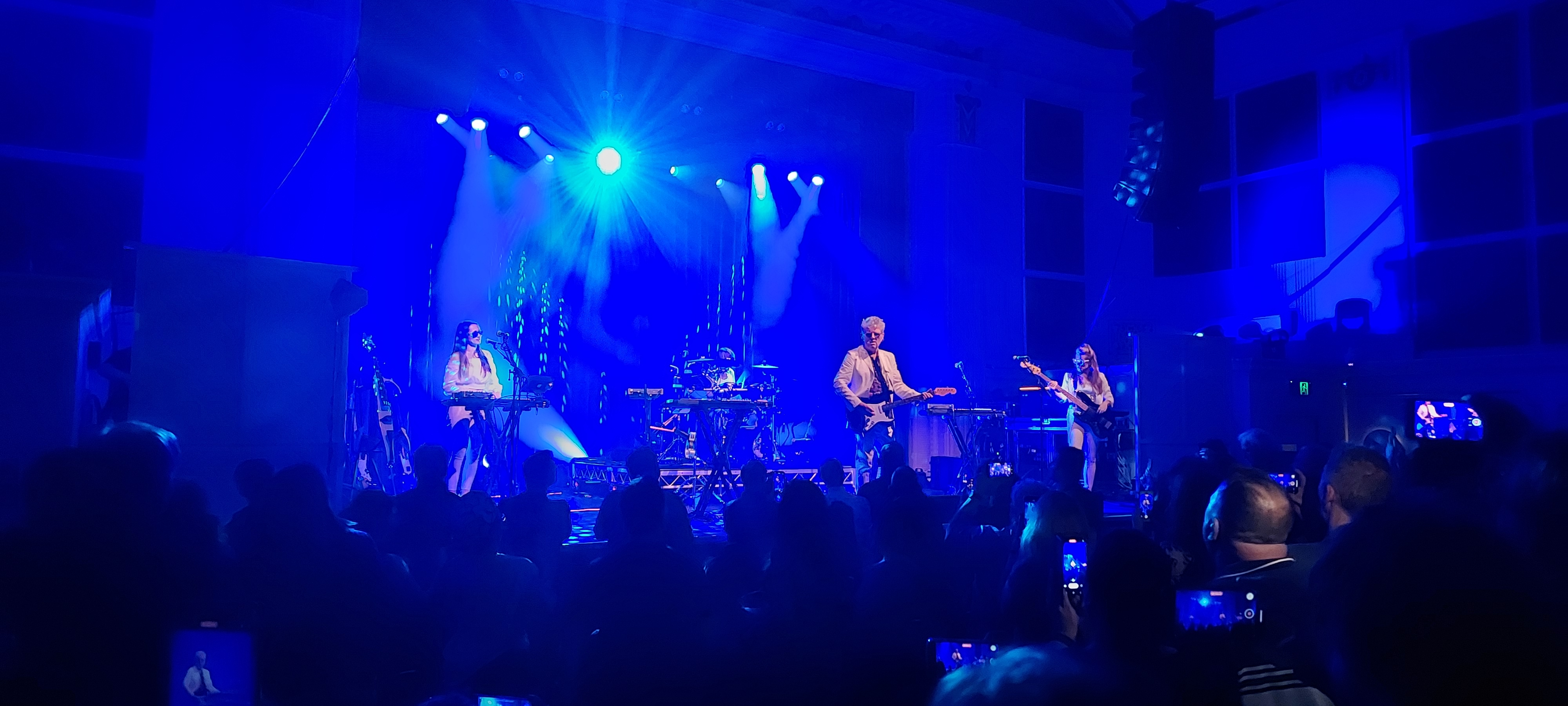
Bailey performing Hold Me Now, Northcote Theatre, October 2022.

Bailey performed Thompson Twins songs live for the first time in 27 years on 17 August 2014 at Temple Island Meadows, Henley-on-Thames, Oxfordshire, for the Rewind South Festival.

In 2014, Bailey also took part in the Retro Futura Tour in the US, along with Howard Jones, Midge Ure, China Crisis and Katrina Leskanich formerly of Katrina and the Waves.

He continues to tour internationally, under the moniker "Thompson Twins' Tom Bailey," performing in the UK and also in North America in 2016.

In 2016, Bailey received the Classic Pop magazine's 'Best Live Show' award.

In 2018, Bailey toured the US with the B-52's and Culture Club, dubbed The Life Tour.

On 3 September 2022, Bailey performed the entire 'Into the Gap' studio album for the first time ever along with his band consisting of Alice Offley (bass guitar and backing vocals), Charlotte Raven (keyboards and cello) and Paulina Szczepaniak (drums and percussion) collectively known as 'The Sisters of Mercy' in Aylesbury, UK (at the Aylesbury Waterside Theatre) to a sold out audience.

This performance also featured a surprise full live performance of Thompson Twins hit "We Are Detective". Bailey had produced a reimagined purely instrumental version of the song that had served as the band's walk-on music for live performances since 2014, but this was the first time the full song appeared as part of the actual set since Bailey's return to performing Thompson Twins material. Alice Offley performed Alannah Currie's vocal parts, in addition to playing bass.

== Awards and nominations ==
Award	Year	Nominee(s)	Category	Result	Ref.
Pollstar Concert Industry Awards	1985	Thompson Twins	Favorite New Headliner of the Year	Nominated	
Pollstar Concert Industry Awards	1986	Thompson Twins	Most Creative Tour Package	Nominated	
Pollstar Concert Industry Awards	1986	Thompson Twins	Most Creative Stage Set	Nominated	

== Personnel ==
=== Members ===
Classic line-up

- Tom Bailey – bass, guitar, keyboards, vocals (1977–1993)
- Joe Leeway – congas, percussion, keyboards, vocals (1981–1986)
- Alannah Currie – drums, percussion, vocals (1981–1993)

Other members

- Pete Dodd – guitar, vocals (1977–1982)
- John Roog – guitar (1977–1982)
- Jon Podgorski – drums (1977–1978)
- Andrew Edge – drums (1978–1979)
- Chris Bell – drums (1979–1982)
- Jane Shorter – saxophone (1981)
- Matthew Seligman – bass (1981–1982)
- Michael White – guitar (Briefly in the extended line-up 1982)

== Discography ==
Studio albums

- A Product Of... (Participation) (1981)
- Set (1982)
- Quick Step & Side Kick (1983)
- Into the Gap (1984)
- Here's to Future Days (1985)
- Close to the Bone (1987)
- Big Trash (1989)
- Queer (1991)

== Bibliography ==
- The Thompson Twins – An Odd Couple (The Official Biography) by Rose Rouse. Virgin Books, 1985.
- Thompson Twin – An '80's Memoir by Michael White. Publisher: Little, Brown (4 May 2000).

== See also ==
- List of Billboard number-one dance club songs
- List of artists who reached number one on the U.S. Dance Club Songs chart
- List of Second British Invasion artists
