= T Records =

- Founded: 1981
- Founder: Thompson Twins
- Distributor: Arista
- Genre: New wave
- Country of origin: UK

T Records was the record label imprint used solely by the Thompson Twins in the UK for their first two albums and corresponding singles.

The band had previously released two 7" singles independently: "Squares And Triangles" (RANK1) and "She's in Love With Mystery" (LATE1). However, they are reissued on this label in 1981. After the 2nd album, T Records was absorbed into Arista Records, where the band continued releasing albums & singles.

UK reissues did not use the T Records imprint, and the singles and both albums were released under Arista Records & other imprints in other markets.

== Albums ==
=== A Product Of... ===
- Producers: John Hade, Mike Howlett, Dennis Bovell, Thompson Twins

LP (TELP1):

1. "When I See You"
2. "Politics"
3. "Slave Trade"
4. "Could Be Her...Could Be You"
5. "Make Believe"
6. "Don't Go Away"
7. "The Price"
8. "Animal Laugh (Oumma Aularesso)"
9. "Anything Is Good Enough"
10. "A Product Of..."
11. "Perfect Game"
12. "Vendredi Saint"

=== Set ===
- Producer: Steve Lillywhite

LP (TELP2):

1. "In The Name of Love"
2. "Living in Europe"
3. "Bouncing"
4. "Tok Tok"
5. "Good Gosh"
6. "The Rowe"
7. "Runaway"
8. "Another Fantasy"
9. "Fool's Gold"
10. "Crazy Dog"
11. "Blind"

Included the free 7" (RANK2):

1. "Squares And Triangles"
2. "Weather Station"
3. "Modern Plumbing"

Note: Track 2 performed by Tom Bailey, and track 3 by The Blankets.

== Singles ==
=== Perfect Game ===
- Release date: February 1981

7" (TEE1):

1. "Perfect Game"
2. "Politics"

=== Animal Laugh (Oumma Aularesso) ===
7" (TEE2):

1. "Animal Laugh (Oumma Aularesso)"
2. "Anything Is Good Enough"
3. "A Dub Product"

12" (TEE122):

1. "Animal Laugh (Oumma Aularesso)" Remix
2. "A Dub Product"
3. "Anything Is Good Enough"

=== Make Believe (Let's Pretend) ===
7" (TEE3):

1. "Make Believe (Let's Pretend)"
2. "Lama Sabach Tani"

12" (TEE123):

1. "Make Believe (Let's Pretend)" Extended Version
2. "Lama Sabach Tani"

=== In The Name of Love ===
- Release date: January 1982

7" (TEE4):

1. "In The Name of Love"
2. "In The Beginning"

12" (TEE124):

1. "In The Name of Love"
2. "In The Beginning"
3. "Coastline"

=== Runaway ===
7" (TEE5):

1. "Runaway"
2. "Open Your Eye"

Included the free live 7" (RANK3):

1. "Living in Europe"
2. "Make Believe"

12" (TEE125):

1. "Runaway" Extended Remix
2. "Bouncing" Extended Remix

== See also ==
- Lists of record labels
