= Get the Message – The Best of Electronic =

Get the Message - The Best of Electronic

Greatest hits album by Electronic
- Released: 18 September 2006
- Recorded: 1989–1998
- Genre: Alternative dance, alternative rock, house
- Length: 70:19
- Label: EMI (United Kingdom); Rhino (United States)
- Producer: Bernard Sumner, Johnny Marr, Neil Tennant, Arthur Baker

Electronic chronology
Twisted Tenderness (1999)	Get the Message - The Best of Electronic (2006)

Professional ratings
Review scores
Source	Rating
Allmusic	4/5 stars
BBC	(favourable)
musicOMH	4/5 stars

Get the Message is a compilation album by the Johnny Marr/Bernard Sumner band Electronic, released in September 2006 (see 2006 in music). It is the first career-spanning collection of the band; a 1999 Japanese compilation was cancelled just before release.

== Content ==
The album includes every A-side (except Make It Happen and Until the End of Time), two B-sides ("Imitation of Life" and "All That I Need") and four album tracks ("Out of My League", "Like No Other", "Prodigal Son" and "Twisted Tenderness"). It was compiled by Craig DeGraff and Electronic. New liner notes written by the band are also included.

A limited edition of the album includes a bonus DVD of all the band's music videos, except for "Late at Night" and the European version of "Getting Away with It" (the American film is featured).

== Track listing ==
All tracks written by Bernard Sumner and Johnny Marr, except where noted.

=== CD ===
1. "Forbidden City" (Sumner, Marr, Karl Bartos) 1996
2. "Getting Away with It" (Sumner, Marr, Neil Tennant) 1989
3. "Get the Message" 1991
4. "Feel Every Beat" 1991
5. "Disappointed" (Sumner, Marr, Tennant) 1992
6. "Vivid" 1999
7. "Second Nature" 1997
8. "All That I Need" 1996
9. "Prodigal Son" 1999
10. "For You" (Sumner, Marr, Karl Bartos) 1996
11. "Imitation of Life" (Sumner, Marr, Karl Bartos) 1996
12. "Out of My League" 1996
13. "Like No Other" 1999
14. "Twisted Tenderness" 1999
15. "Late at Night" 1999

=== DVD (Limited Edition - PAL) ===
1. "Getting Away with It" (Sumner, Marr, Tennant)
2. "Get the Message"
3. "Feel Every Beat"
4. "Disappointed" (Sumner, Marr, Tennant)
5. "Forbidden City"
6. "For You"
7. "Vivid"

== Charts ==
Chart performance for Get the Message – The Best of Electronic
Chart (2023)	Peak position
Hungarian Physical Albums (MAHASZ)	8
