= Electronic (album) =

Studio album by Electronic
- Released: 28 May 1991
- Recorded: December 1989–early 1991
- Studios: Clear Studios, Manchester
- Genres: Alternative dance; synth-pop; alternative rock
- Length: 47:17 (UK); 52:29 (international)
- Labels: Factory (UK); Virgin (Europe); Warner Bros. (Australia, Canada, Japan, US)
- Producers: Bernard Sumner, Johnny Marr

Electronic chronology
Electronic (1991)	Raise the Pressure (1996)

Electronic is the debut studio album by the British group Electronic, consisting of Bernard Sumner, the former guitarist and keyboardist of Joy Division and the lead singer and guitarist of New Order, and Johnny Marr, the former guitarist of the Smiths. It was first released in May 1991 on the Factory label.

The album was a commercial and critical success, reaching number 2 in the United Kingdom and selling over a million copies worldwide. By the year 2000, Electronic had sold 240,000 copies in the US.

== Recording ==
The bulk of Electronic was written in 1990, with sessions beginning that January at Johnny Marr's home studio in Manchester. "Gangster" dated from an aborted solo album that Bernard Sumner had begun working on in the mid-eighties, while "Reality" was written around 1988 when he and Marr first began working together. "The Patience of a Saint" also predated the album, having been written with Pet Shop Boys soon after their collaboration with singer Neil Tennant on "Getting Away with It" in 1989.

Several other songs were also completed by August 1990 (namely "Idiot Country", "Tighten Up", "Soviet", "Get the Message" and "Try All You Want"), as they were performed live at Dodger Stadium in Los Angeles when Electronic supported Depeche Mode (although "Try All You Want" was played as an instrumental and several songs had working titles).

The LP subtly fused Marr's guitar playing with Sumner's synthesiser expertise, most prominently on "Idiot Country", "Feel Every Beat", "Tighten Up" and "Get the Message". Lyrically the subject matter was varied, from the aggressive targeting of rave culture by police in Britain ("Idiot Country" and "Feel Every Beat") to monogamy and emotional ambivalence ("Reality", "Try All You Want"). "The Patience of a Saint" featured a witty, sardonic duet between Sumner and Tennant.

== Equipment ==
In an interview with Sound on Sound in October 1991, Bernard Sumner revealed the following technology was used during the making of the album. He stated that the album "took 200 days from beginning to end" in the same interview.

- Akai S1000
- Korg T3
- Roland Juno-106
- Sequential Circuits Prophet-5
- Voyetra-8
- Yamaha DX5
- Roland JD-800
- Moog Source
- Roland SH-101
- Roland TR-909
- Roland MT-32
- Roland D-110
- Macintosh SE
- Macintosh IIcx
- Sound Tools

== Promotion ==
"Get the Message" was released on 15 April 1991 as the lead single and performed well in both Britain (number 8 on the Top 40) and the United States (number 1 on Modern Rock Tracks). In July, "Tighten Up" was released as a promo in the US and reached number 6 on the same chart. "Feel Every Beat" was the next international single in September and was a modest hit.

Three songs from this era were released as B-sides: "Free Will" (on "Get the Message"), and "Lean to the Inside" and "Second to None" (on "Feel Every Beat"). A number of remixes were also released, by DNA, Winston Jones/Dave Shaw and Danny Rampling/Pete Lorimer.

Sumner and Marr gave a slew of interviews in the mainstream British music press, and appeared on Friday at the Dome and MTV's 120 Minutes to support the album. "Get the Message" was also promoted with two mimed performances on Top of the Pops.

Electronic performed at the Cities in the Park festival in August, where Pet Shop Boys guested on "Getting Away with It", and played three dates in Paris, Glasgow and London in December 1991. (A tour of North America in October/November with dance acts as support was cancelled.) Pet Shop Boys joined Sumner and Marr for three numbers in the last concert, namely "Getting Away with It", "The Patience of a Saint" and the then-unreleased song "Disappointed".

== Artwork ==
The album cover was designed by Johnson/Panas (Trevor Johnson), featuring two separate photographs superimposed with a computer screen effect. The hand-rendered lettering was based on typographer Wim Crouwel's Stedelijk Museum alphabet. The 1994 remaster used the design from a 1991 promotional poster with the typeface (Avenir) from the sleevenotes.

== Critical reception ==
Professional ratings
Review scores
Source	Rating
AllMusic	4/5 stars
Entertainment Weekly	A
Mojo	3/5 stars
NME	8/10
Q	5/5 stars
Record Collector	3/5 stars
The Rolling Stone Album Guide	3.5/5 stars
Select	3/5
Uncut	8/10
Vox	10/10

Upon its release, the album was unanimously praised in the mainstream music press. Writing in Melody Maker, Paul Lester stated that "Each song is crammed with elaborate details and merits a treatise ... Very basically, we're talking Europop, my all-time favourite genre. The overall effect is one of swirling magnificence". He concluded that Electronic was "one of the greatest albums ever made".

In the NME, David Quantick wrote, "This is a pretty 1990s sort of a record, fresh as a daisy and wearing huge new oxblood Doc Martens". Keith Cameron in Vox said, "Electronic is simply a 100 per cent pure distillation of Marr and Sumner's respective talents. The hit single 'Get the Message' has it in a nutshell: it breaks no new ground; it simply achieves perfection".

The album received the maximum five stars in Q from Phil Sutcliffe, who wrote, "its strength is in conflict ... The inexorable pounding of the beatbox versus the fragile sadness of Sumner's voice and the he's/she's leaving stories; the symmetry of the synthesized or sampled sounds versus the sheer blood and bone physicality of Marr's guitar".

Electronic also received praise in the United States. In Spin magazine, Ted Friedman regarded the album as "impressive", while Entertainment Weekly called it "irresistibly tuneful".

At the end of 1991, NME and Melody Maker ranked it 13 and 15 respectively in their top albums of the year.

== Track listing ==
All songs written by Bernard Sumner and Johnny Marr, except "The Patience of a Saint", by Sumner, Marr, Neil Tennant and Chris Lowe, and "Getting Away with It", by Sumner, Marr and Tennant.

=== Standard edition ===
The standard edition of Electronic was released initially in 1991, internationally (with the noticeable absence of "Getting Away with It" on the original UK release). It was remastered and reissued many times in different regions, such as in Europe in 1992, with the non-album single "Disappointed" being added as a bonus CD, in the UK in 1994 (remastered by the album's engineer Owen Morris), and Japan in 1995.

No.	Title	Length
1.	"Idiot Country"	5:02
2.	"Reality"	5:39
3.	"Tighten Up"	4:38
4.	"The Patience of a Saint"	4:11
5.	"Getting Away with It" (did not appear on the first UK edition)	5:14
6.	"Gangster" (replaced by "Getting Away with It" in some territories)	5:24
7.	"Soviet"	2:00
8.	"Get the Message"	5:20
9.	"Try All You Want"	5:37
10.	"Some Distant Memory"	4:09
11.	"Feel Every Beat"	5:08

=== 2007 iTunes release bonus tracks ===
In 2007, Electronic was released as a download-only on the iTunes Store, with the first half of the release containing the original 11 songs from the 1994 remastered UK release, and the other half featuring B-sides of singles and remixes of Electronic songs by third parties.

No.	Title	Length
12.	"Lucky Bag" (B-side of "Getting Away With It")	5:46
13.	"Free Will (7-inch Edit)" (B-side of "Get the Message")	2:45
14.	"Feel Every Beat (7-inch Remix)" (Single edit)	3:52
15.	"Lean to the Inside" (B-side of "Feel Every Beat")	4:08
16.	"Second to None" (B-side of "Feel Every Beat")	4:03
17.	"Disappointed (Original Mix)" (B-side of non-album single "Disappointed")	5:44
18.	"Disappointed (7-inch Mix)" (B-side of non-album single "Disappointed")	4:23
19.	"Feel Every Beat (DNA Remix)"	5:40
20.	"Disappointed (12-inch Remix)" (B-side of non-album single "Disappointed")	4:34
21.	"Lucky Bag (Miami Edit)" (B-side of "Getting Away With It")	4:31
22.	"Idiot Country Two (AKA Ultimatum Mix)"	6:22
23.	"Gangster (FBI Mix)"	8:01

=== 2013 special edition CD bonus tracks ===
The 2013 special edition re-release of the album contains two CDs, with the first CD containing the standard album and the second CD containing 11 edits and mixes of various songs, mostly from the Electronic recording sessions. However, some songs were produced outside the time-frame in which the album was recorded, such as "Until the End of Time", "Visit Me" and the B-side of "Second Nature", called "Turning Point", which originated from the Raise the Pressure recording sessions. Furthermore, "Twisted Tenderness" is the title track of the album of the same name, which was released eight years after the release of Electronic.

CD2
No.	Title	Length
1.	"Disappointed" (Stephen Hague 7-inch version)	4:21
2.	"Second to None" (2013 edit)	3:37
3.	"Lean to the Inside" (2013 edit)	4:01
4.	"Twisted Tenderness" (guitar / vocal mix)	4:55
5.	"Idiot Country Two" (12-inch version; edit)	6:06
6.	"Free Will" (edit)	3:05
7.	"Until the End of Time" (edit)	5:23
8.	"Feel Every Beat" (2013 edit)	5:39
9.	"Getting Away with It" (instrumental)	5:04
10.	"Turning Point" (edit)	4:49
11.	"Visit Me" (edit)	5:08
12.	"Twisted Tenderness" (instrumental)	5:31

== Personnel ==
Electronic

- Bernard Sumner – vocals, keyboards and programming
- Johnny Marr – guitars, keyboards and programming

Additional musicians

- Neil Tennant – vocals on "The Patience of a Saint" and backing vocals on "Getting Away with It"
- Chris Lowe – keyboards on "The Patience of a Saint", synth-bass on "Getting Away with It"
- Donald Johnson – drums and percussion on "Tighten Up" and "Feel Every Beat"
- David Palmer – drums on "Feel Every Beat" and "Getting Away with It"
- Denise Johnson – vocals on "Get the Message"
- Helen Powell – oboe on "Some Distant Memory"
- Andrew Robinson – additional programming

Technical

- Bernard Sumner – producer
- Johnny Marr – producer
- Owen Morris – engineer
- Todd Fath – photography
- Johnson Panas – artwork

== Charts ==
Chart performance for Electronic
Chart (1991)	Peak position
Australian Albums (ARIA)	42
Canada Top Albums/CDs (RPM)	66
Swedish Albums (Sverigetopplistan)	19
UK Albums (Official Charts)	2
US Billboard 200	109
US Billboard Heatseekers	1
