= Forbidden City (song) =

Single by Electronic

from the album Raise the Pressure
- B-side: "Imitation of Life", "A New Religion"
- Released: 24 June 1996
- Recorded: 1994–1995
- Genre: Alternative rock
- Label: Parlophone (UK); Virgin (Europe); Warner (Australia, US)
- Songwriters: Bernard Sumner; Johnny Marr; Karl Bartos
- Producers: Bernard Sumner; Johnny Marr

Electronic singles chronology
"Disappointed" (1992)	"Forbidden City" (1996)	"For You" (1996)

"Forbidden City" is a song by English band Electronic, comprising Bernard Sumner and Johnny Marr, with guesting co-writer Karl Bartos of Kraftwerk, released as the lead single from their second album, Raise the Pressure (1996), and their first new release in almost exactly four years, the last being the stand-alone single "Disappointed".

== Composition ==
The track was one of the fastest to be written and recorded on the album, with most of the music by Marr and the lyrics by Sumner (much like "Get the Message" and "Make It Happen"). It is a guitar pop/rock song with a heavily distorted guitar solo by Marr; lyrically it is about a young man who has an abusive relationship with his father but wants to return home despite this antagonism.

== Single ==
As well as a UK release, "Forbidden City" was also issued in Australia and Germany on Compact Disc, and in the US as a 1-track radio promo. The commercial releases came with two non-album B-sides: "Imitation of Life" (an edited version of which would appear on Get the Message - The Best of Electronic ten years later) and "A New Religion", which featured Denise Johnson providing backing vocals. All three songs were written with Karl Bartos. The Australian CD omitted "A New Religion" in favour of "Getting Away with It".

The song was not a huge hit (#14 on the UK Singles Chart) but did receive substantial radio play in Britain. It remains one of Johnny Marr's favourite Electronic songs, and opened up the best of in 2006, with stills from its Tom Merriton-directed video used for the front cover and inside the booklet.

== Track listings ==
=== UK 7" and MC ===
1. "Forbidden City"
2. "Imitation of Life"

=== UK/EU CD ===
1. "Forbidden City"
2. "Imitation of Life"
3. "A New Religion"

=== Australian CD ===
1. "Forbidden City"
2. "Imitation of Life"
3. "Getting Away with It"

== Charts ==
Chart (1996)	Peak position
Europe (Eurochart Hot 100)	62
Europe (European Dance Radio)	8
Scotland (OCC)	13
Sweden (Sverigetopplistan)	31
UK Singles (OCC)	14
