= For You (Electronic song) =

Single by Electronic

from the album Raise the Pressure
- B-side: "All That I Need", "I Feel Alright", "Free Will", "Disappointed"
- Released: 16 September 1996
- Genre: Alternative rock
- Label: Parlophone (United Kingdom); Virgin (Europe)
- Songwriters: Bernard Sumner; Johnny Marr; Karl Bartos
- Producers: Bernard Sumner; Johnny Marr

Electronic singles chronology
"Forbidden City" (1996)	"For You" (1996)	"Second Nature" (1997)

Second CD cover
- The second UK CD

"For You" is a song by English band Electronic, comprising Bernard Sumner and Johnny Marr, with guesting co-writer Karl Bartos of Kraftwerk, released as the second single from their second album, Raise the Pressure (1996). "For You" reached number 16 on the UK Singles Chart.

== Single ==
As was the trend in the 1990s, it was issued as two Compact Discs as well as on cassette. The first CD featured two exclusive B-sides ("I Feel Alright" and "All That I Need"), while the second had three previously released tracks from the period of their first album Electronic (the 12" remix of "Get the Message, its B-side "Free Will", and "Disappointed"). In Europe only the first CD was released.

== Versions ==
"I Feel Alright", also written with Bartos, remains commercially unavailable, although the Marr-Sumner track "All That I Need" was included on the Japanese issue of Raise the Pressure and the 2006 compilation Get the Message – The Best of Electronic. The album version of "For You" was also included on this collection.

A UK 1-track promo CD featured a shorter edit than the single and album versions, and soundtracked its music video directed by Richard Heslop.

== Track listings ==
- UK CD1/EU CD
1. "For You"
2. "All That I Need"
3. "I Feel Alright"
- UK CD2
1. "For You"
2. "Free Will" (12" mix)
3. "Disappointed"
4. "Get the Message" (DNA Mix)
- UK MC
1. "For You"
2. "All That I Need"
- UK promo CD
1. "For You" (radio edit)

== Charts ==
Chart (1996)	Peak position
Europe (European Dance Radio)	10
UK Singles (OCC)	16
