= Electronic =

Electronic may refer to:

- Electronics, a scientific and technical field
- Electronics (magazine), a defunct American trade journal
- Electronic storage, the storage of data using an electronic device
- Electronic commerce or e-commerce, the trading in products or services using computer networks, such as the Internet
- Electronic publishing or e-publishing, the digital publication of books and magazines using computer networks, such as the Internet
- Electronic engineering, an electrical engineering discipline

== Entertainment ==
- Electronic (band), an English alternative dance band
  - Electronic (album), the self-titled debut album by British band Electronic
- Electronic music, a music genre
- Electronic musical instrument
- Electronic game, a game that employs electronics

== See also ==
- Electronica, an electronic music genre
- Consumer electronics, devices including active (amplifying) electrical components
