= Electric Music =

Studio album by Electric Music
- Released: 1998
- Genre: Pop, Alternative rock
- Length: 56:55; 73:32 (Japanese release)
- Label: ElectricMusic / SPV (D); East West (UK)
- Producer: Karl Bartos, Markus Löhr

Karl Bartos chronology
Esperanto (1993)	Electric Music (1998)	Communication (2003)

Singles from Electric Music
- 1. "Sunshine" Released: 1998; 2. "Call on Me" Released: 1998

Electric Music was the second album by Karl Bartos' "Elektric Music" project, recorded after his collaboration with UK band Electronic on their 1996 album Raise the Pressure and released in 1998. The entire album was written by Bartos and was, according to his website, an "exploration of the sound of the sixties — guitar pop out of the computer!"

== Track listing ==
All tracks are written by Karl Bartos

No.	Title	Length
1.	"The Young Urban Professional"	4:42
2.	"Sunshine"	5:41
3.	"Another Day"	5:04
4.	"Friends"	4:27
5.	"Call on Me"	3:34
6.	"Together We Can Do It All"	5:37
7.	"Out of This World"	3:49
8.	"Only a Dream"	5:36
9.	"Shallow Grave"	3:57
10.	"Falling"	4:01
11.	"Sunshine (Reprise)"	3:24
12.	"The Long Way"	7:03

Bonus tracks on the Japanese release
No.	Title	Length
13.	"Call on Me [Acoustic Mix]"	3:32
14.	"Sunshine [Acoustic Mix]"	3:45
15.	"Sunshine [Dream Mix]"	4:08
16.	"Sunshine [Electric Mix]"	5:21

== Personnel ==
- Karl Bartos – Vocals, keyboards, guitars, production
- Markus Löhr – Keyboards, guitars, production
- Stefan Ingmann – Mix
- Guido Apke – Engineer
- Rüdiger Nehmzow – Cover art
