= Get the Message (song) =

1991 single by Electronic

- The first British 12-inch

Single by Electronic

from the album Electronic
- B-side: "Free Will"
- Released: 15 April 1991
- Label: Factory; Virgin; Warner Bros.
- Songwriters: Bernard Sumner; Johnny Marr
- Producers: Bernard Sumner; Johnny Marr

Electronic singles chronology
"Getting Away with It" (1989)	"Get the Message" (1991)	"Tighten Up" (1991)

Remix 12-inch
- The second British 12-inch

"Get the Message" is a song by Electronic, the English band formed by Bernard Sumner of New Order and ex-Smiths guitarist Johnny Marr. "Get the Message" was the second single from their 1991 debut album, Electronic, and was a commercial success around the world. It is an example of Marr and Sumner's original concept of mixing the synthesizers of New Order with the Smiths' guitar sound.

== Composition ==
Marr composed the music then Sumner wrote the lyric as engineer Owen Morris played him the song every four bars. Marr was reluctant to layer multiple guitar parts as he was wary of treading ground, but Sumner convinced him otherwise. During recording, Primal Scream vocalist Denise Johnson added a vocal at the end of the song. She went on to provide additional vocals on a number of songs on Electronic's second album Raise the Pressure five years later. (Note: Raise the Pressure was mainly recorded in 1995.)

== Artwork ==
The first releases were packaged by Johnson/Panas (the moniker of Trevor Johnson), who also designed Electronic's then imminent first album Electronic. Each format bore a unique colour scheme, all versions featuring the artist and single name with a bold number "2" underneath, signifying its place in Electronic's discography. The only format which differed from this theme was the second British 12-inch release, designed by 3a (who also oversaw third single "Feel Every Beat").

== Release ==
"Get the Message" is the seventh track on the British version of Electronic and the eighth on most of the international editions. (Note: Most of the international editions of Electronic included "Getting Away with It" as the fifth track, thus shifting "Get the Message" down one place.) It later became the title track of the band's career-spanning compilation in 2006. The single was issued in the United Kingdom on 7-inch, 12-inch, CD and cassette by Factory Records on 15 April 1991 (and two weeks later as a second 12-inch comprising two additional remixes by DNA) and as a three-format maxi single and standard cassette by Warner Bros. Records in the United States.

"Get the Message" appears as a remixed 7-inch edit on most of the formats and in its original, full-length version on the first UK 12-inch. Later pressings of the UK 7-inch and the German CD maxi single feature an edit of the album version, which was also used for the music video. This was because Bernard Sumner objected to the earlier mix, having heard it on a Manchester radio station prior to the release of the single. The US and German maxi singles compiled all of these versions collectively; the only recordings from this single that remain scarce are edits of the two DNA remixes, which were released on promos, namely a British 7-inch and a US CD maxi single.

Like its predecessor "Getting Away with It", "Get the Message" includes a non-album track as its B-side: "Free Will", a mercurial, sample-heavy dance track. This appears in an edited form on the 7-inch releases and in its original six-minute form on all the others. (The German CD maxi single included both) An edited version is included on the 2013 re-release of the album Electronic.

== Reception ==
Commercially, "Get the Message" reached number eight on the UK Singles Chart, becoming one of Electronic's highest positions. In the United States, it was massively played on alternative rock radio stations and consequently it reached the top of the Billboard Modern Rock Tracks chart. It was also popular in US clubs and so it also reached number eight on the Billboard Hot Dance Music/Club Play chart.

Critical reaction to "Get the Message" was generally positive. Writing in the NME, Andrew Collins called the song "draught genius" and concluded that "New Order can now split up", while David Quantick stated that "nothing anyone has ever done has sounded even vaguely like 'Get the Message'" in the same publication a month later. Phil Sutcliffe in Q was less enthusiastic, suggesting it "almost slip[s] from identity into identikit", while Melody Maker described listening to the track as "Like watching a pony chew on a carrot for half an hour".

"Get the Message" is consistently cited as a defining track by Electronic. AllMusic picks it as a highlight of the Electronic album in a 4/5 review, while bbc.co.uk states that "the excellent 'Get the Message' still holds its own alongside the best of early '90s Mancunian tunes". In 2007 Johnny Marr said it was "...maybe the track I'm most proud of out of my whole career", and in June 2009 reiterated that it is "the best song I've written".

== Music video ==
Marr and Sumner in the music video.

The single was promoted by a music video in which Marr and Sumner strolled through the Philippines and atop the still-active Taal Volcano — which Marr narrowly missed falling into. It was directed by Gunther Deichmann, whose published photographs had impressed Electronic. At least two versions of this film exist: one with phrases from the song lyrics punctuating the scenic shots (and lower-case letters spelling out 'electronic') and another more simple edit without any words. The former version is available on the Get the Message DVD.

== Live versions ==
"Get the Message" was first played live in 1990 at Dodger Stadium in Los Angeles, when Electronic supported Depeche Mode on 4 and 5 August. It was also performed at their first British gig the following January at the Haçienda nightclub in Manchester; the Cities in the Park festival in the same city seven months later; and at each of the three gigs on their short tour of Europe in December. Electronic also promoted the single with appearances on Top of the Pops in April and May 1991, miming to the album edit and the edit of the "DNA Groove Mix" respectively.

== Track listings ==
- UK 7-inch, 12-inch and cassette
1. "Get the Message"
2. "Free Will"

Note: The 7-inch and cassette comprised edits of both songs.

- UK remix 12-inch
1. "Get the Message" (DNA Groove mix)
2. "Get the Message" (DNA Sin mix)

Note: This record was only released in Britain.

- UK CD
1. "Get the Message" (7-inch)
2. "Free Will" (12-inch)
3. "Get the Message" (12-inch)
- US maxi single
1. "Get the Message" (extended mix)
2. "Free Will" (extended mix)
3. "Get the Message" (DNA Groove mix)
4. "Get the Message" (DNA Sin mix)

Note: The CD included "Get the Message" (single mix).

- European CD maxi single
1. "Get the Message" (7-inch)
2. "Get the Message" (12-inch)
3. "Free Will" (7-inch)
4. "Free Will" (12-inch)
5. "Get the Message" (DNA Groove mix)
6. "Get the Message" (DNA Sin mix)

== Charts ==
=== Weekly charts ===
Chart (1991)	Peak position
Australia (ARIA)	71
Europe (Eurochart Hot 100)	27
Germany (GfK)	37
Netherlands (Single Top 100)	60
UK Singles (Official Charts)	8
UK Airplay (Music Week)	11
UK Indie (Music Week)	1
US 12-inch Singles Sales (Billboard)	15
US Dance Club Play (Billboard)	8
US Modern Rock Tracks (Billboard)	1

=== Year-end charts ===
Chart (1991)	Position
US Modern Rock Tracks (Billboard)	3

== Appearances ==
The song received some exposure in 2003 when it was used in an episode of CSI: Crime Scene Investigation, which has featured other songs by Bernard Sumner, under his band New Order. It has also appeared on a handful of various artists compilations.

== See also ==
- Number one modern rock hits of 1991
