= Vivid (song) =

Single by Electronic

from the album Twisted Tenderness
- B-side: "Radiation"
- Released: 12 April 1999
- Recorded: 1998
- Genre: Alternative rock
- Length: 3:50 (radio edit); 5:34 (album version)
- Label: Parlophone (United Kingdom); Virgin (Europe)
- Songwriters: Bernard Sumner, Johnny Marr
- Producers: Bernard Sumner, Johnny Marr, Arthur Baker

Electronic singles chronology
"Until the End of Time" (1997)	"Vivid" (1999)	"Make It Happen" (1999)

"Vivid" is a song by Electronic, the eighth single released by the group. It was released in April 1999 by Parlophone in Britain and by Virgin in Germany. "Vivid" reached #17 on the UK Singles Chart.

== Recording ==
The song was recorded by full-time members Sumner and Marr with Doves bassist Jimi Goodwin and Black Grape drummer Jed Lynch. An early version of the song was written and sung by Marr, before Sumner added some of the words and the melody. The finished album version is in fact the demo, although subsequent production by Arthur Baker and his programming collaborator Merv de Peyer included a sampled loop which runs throughout the track in tandem with the kit drums.

This track and 'Prodigal Son' are the first examples of Johnny Marr's lyrics on a record, before his future ventures with 'The Healers'.

== Formats ==
Like their last two singles ("For You" and "Second Nature"), "Vivid" was issued on two Compact Discs, and also on 12" vinyl in the UK. The principal B-side was "Radiation", a seven-minute instrumental co-credited to Arthur Baker.

== B-sides ==
In addition to a single mix of the A-side itself, four other remixes appeared as B-sides: versions of "Prodigal Son" by Two Lone Swordsmen, DJ Harvey and Inch (Keir Stewart and Simon Spencer), and a mix of "Haze" by Merv de Peyer. Like "Vivid", both tracks were from the album Twisted Tenderness.

The single mix of "Vivid" done by Merv de Peyer (who also mixed the album version), was shorter than the album version, and was included on Get the Message - The Best of Electronic in 2006.

== Track listing ==
=== UK 12" ===
1. "Vivid (Radio Edit)" - 3:50
2. "Prodigal Son (Two Lone Swordsmen Mix)" - 5:33
3. "Prodigal Son (Harvey's a Star In Your Own Mind Mix)" - 10:22

=== UK CD1 ===
1. "Vivid (Radio Edit)" - 3:50
2. "Haze (Alternative Mix)" - 5:22
3. "Prodigal Son (Harvey's a Star In Your Own Mind Mix)" - 10:22

=== UK CD2 ===
1. "Vivid (Album Version)" - 5:34
2. "Radiation" - 7:30
3. "Prodigal Son (Inch Remix)" - 5:05

=== UK promo CD (released 23 February 1999) ===
1. "Vivid (Radio Edit)" - 3:52

=== EU CD1 ===
1. "Vivid (Radio Edit)" - 3:50
2. "Haze (Alternate Take)" - 5:22
3. "Prodigal Son (Harvey's a Star In Your Own Mind Mix)" - 10:22

=== EU CD2 ===
1. "Vivid (Radio Edit)" - 3:50
2. "Haze (Alternate Take)" - 5:22
