= Groove On (song) =

Single by Thompson Twins

from the album Queer
- Released: February 1992
- Length: 6:00 (club groove); 3:27 (single remix)
- Label: Warner
- Songwriter(s): Alannah Currie; Tom Bailey
- Producer(s): Tom Bailey; Alannah Currie

Thompson Twins singles chronology
"The Saint" (1992)	"Groove On" (1992)	"Play with Me (Jane)" (1992)

"Groove On" is a song from the British pop duo Thompson Twins, which was released in 1992 as the third single from their eighth studio album Queer (1991). The song was written and produced by Alannah Currie and Tom Bailey.

== Background ==
"Groove On" was released as a single in the United States only in February 1992. It was the third single to be released from Queer, but only the second to be released in US. "Groove On" was the follow-up to "Come Inside", which had achieved success on the Billboard Hot Dance Music Club Play and 12-inch Singles Sales charts in 1991. Although "Groove On" failed to replicate the same level of success as its predecessor, the single did reach number 3 on the Billboard Hot Dance Breakouts Club Play chart in February 1992.

== Critical reception ==
On its release in the US, Larry Flick, writing for Billboard, described "Groove On" as a "smokin' down-tempo houser". He considered the remixes of the song to "work extremely well", with Tommy Musto adding "a jazzy touch" and Rev. T "accelerat[ing] the track to a frenetic techno pace". He added that the resulting "quite appealing" release "comes [with] a wide variety of moods, ranging from slow 'n' sleazy deep house to frenetic techno".

Black Radio Exclusive commented, "Thompson Twins have a definite body rockin' tune with this house-styled groove. It shows hints of R&B and house throughout. A wicked techno mix should help this one in the clubs and on various mix formats." DJ Andy Kastanas, writing for The Charlotte Observer, commented, "There's a version for every taste on the single, beginning with a downtempo vocal mix that'll rock you and a severely uptempo 'rave' instrumental that'll roll you!"

== Formats ==
12-inch single (US)
No.	Title	Notes	Length
1.	"Groove On"	Rev. T's Club Groove	6:00
2.	"Groove On"	Techno Groove Mix	7:03
3.	"Groove On"	Rev T's Church Dub Groove	4:15
4.	"Groove On"	Extended Groove Mix	5:52
5.	"Groove On"	Classic Groove Mix	6:38
6.	"Queer"	Album Version	3:17

12-inch promotional single (US)
No.	Title	Notes	Length
1.	"Groove On"	Rev. T's Club Groove	6:04
2.	"Groove On"	Rev T's Church Dub Groove	4:15
3.	"Groove On"	Rev. T's Single Remix	3:37
4.	"Groove On"	Techno Groove Mix	7:03
5.	"Groove On"	Headbanger Dub	6:13

CD single (US)
No.	Title	Notes	Length
1.	"Groove On"	Rev. T's Single Remix	3:37
2.	"Groove On"	Rev. T's Club Groove	6:00
3.	"Groove On"	Techno Groove Mix	7:03
4.	"Queer"	Album Version	3:17
5.	"Groove On"	Extended Groove Mix	5:52

CD promotional single (US)
No.	Title	Notes	Length
1.	"Groove On"	Rev. T's Single Remix	3:37
2.	"Groove On"	Club Edit	3:23
3.	"Groove On"	Album Version	3:54

== Personnel ==
Credits are adapted from the US 12-inch and CD single sleeve/liner notes.

Production

- Tom Bailey, Alannah Currie – producers
- Keith Fernley – assistant producer
- Rev. T – additional production and remixer ("Single Remix", "Club Groove", "Church Dub Groove")
- Tommy Musto – additional production, programming and remixer ("Club Edit", "Techno Groove Mix", "Headbanger Dub")
- Rob "Retro" Paustian – mix engineer ("Club Edit", "Techno Groove Mix", "Headbanger Dub")
- Peter Dauo – keyboards ("Club Edit", "Techno Groove Mix", "Headbanger Dub")

Other

- Heather Laurie – design

== Charts ==
Chart (1992)	Peak position
US Hot Dance Breakouts Club Play (Billboard)	3
