= Off the Record (Karl Bartos album) =

Studio album by Karl Bartos
- Released: 15 March 2013
- Recorded: 1977–1993, 2010–2012
- Genre: Synth-pop
- Length: 39:45
- Label: Bureau B
- Producer: Karl Bartos

Karl Bartos chronology
Communication (2003)	Off the Record (2013)

Singles from Off the Record
- 1. "Atomium" Released: 1 February 2013; 2. "Without a Trace of Emotion" Released: 18 March 2013

Professional ratings
Aggregate scores
Source	Rating
Metacritic	64/100
Review scores
Source	Rating
Allmusic	3.5/5 stars
Beats per Minute	62%
Clash	6/10
Drowned in Sound	5/10
Exclaim!	7/10
The Independent	3/5 stars
Pitchfork Media	5.4/10
Popmatters	6/10 discs
Record Collector	4/5 stars
Rolling Stone Russia	3/5 stars

Off the Record is the second solo studio album by German musician and composer Karl Bartos (formerly of Kraftwerk). It was released on 15 March 2013, through Bureau B Records. It is Bartos' first solo album in ten years, though much of the material on Off the Record predates that on 2003's Communication.

== Singles ==
"Atomium" was released as a single on 1 February 2013.

"Without a Trace of Emotion" was released as a promo-single on 18 March 2013.

== Track listing ==
All tracks are written by Karl Bartos except "Musica Ex Machina", written by Bartos, Johnny Marr and Bernard Sumner.

No.	Title	Length
1.	"Atomium"	3:16
2.	"Nachtfahrt"	3:30
3.	"International Velvet"	4:38
4.	"Without a Trace of Emotion"	3:28
5.	"The Binary Code"	1:42
6.	"Musica Ex Machina"	5:16
7.	"The Tuning of the World"	3:33
8.	"Instant Bayeruth"	3:36
9.	"Vox Humana"	2:56
10.	"Rhythmus"	4:17
11.	"Silence"	0:06
12.	"Hausmusik"	3:30

=== Notes ===
- "Musica Ex Machina" is based on a composition which had previously been adapted into "Imitation of Life" by Electronic.
- "Silence" consists of 6 seconds of ambient studio noise.

== Charts ==
=== Weekly charts ===
Chart (2013)	Peak position
Belgian Albums (Ultratop Wallonia)	161
German Albums (Offizielle Top 100)	44
Swedish Albums (Sverigetopplistan)	47
UK Dance Albums (OCC)	38
UK Independent Albums (OCC)	29
