= Lowe (band) =

Swedish synthpop band

- Origin: Stockholm, Sweden
- Genres: Synthpop
- Years active: 2003–present
- Labels: Megahype
- Members: Leo Josefsson; Rickard Gunnarsson; Tobias Ersson
- Past members: Mehdi Bagherzadeh
- Website: http://www.lowemusic.net

Lowe is a Swedish synthpop band formed in 2002 by Leo Josefsson (vocals/guitar), Rickard Gunnarsson (bass) and Mehdi Bagherzadeh (keyboards). The music can be described as emotional pop, contrived with electronic elements. Their first three singles "The Vanishing", "Ahead Of Our Time" and "Hear Me Out" quickly earned them the reputation as "the new hope for Swedish pop". The band has been compared to such artists as Depeche Mode, New Order, Keane and A-ha.

== History ==
The band born when Rickard Gunnarsson, Leo Josefsson of the Swedish band Statemachine and Mehdi Bagherzadeh decides to work together in a new electronic music project. When former Statemachine member Albion left the band in 2001 it felt natural to bring Leo in. That's when they started to talk about Lowe, and luckily Statemachine has decided to take a small break at the time. They agreed of naming the band Lowe, as a kind of mixture between the English words "love" and "low", which describes their music very well. It is also quite probable that "Lowe" refers to "Chris Lowe" from the Pet Shop Boys since they called their first album "Tenant" - the singer of the Pet Shop Boys is called "Neil Tennant". Mehdi left the band in the beginning of 2009, with Leo and Rickard continuing as a duo on the Kino International Tour. Long time friend Tobias Ersson, which had been a live keyboardist on tour, joined Lowe in the spring of 2009, after extensive touring in Russia, Ukraine and Turkey.

Leo comes from a small industrial town called Oxelösund, but now lives in Stockholm, the capital of Sweden. He's a professional songwriter and producer, and has worked with artists such as Rednex, Shebang, Daze and Yaki-Da. He is also a well known and respected music video director and has worked with artists like Kent, The Pusher, Alex Saidac, Anna Bergendahl, The Mobile Homes, Dupont, AiluCrash, Michaela de la Cour. Leo's grand father was the world champion wrestler Karl Karlsson (Big Swede, Krusher Karlsson), who owned the title twice in the 1960s.

Rickard was born and raised in Stockholm. He has played in several bands since childhood, released his first record when he was 7 and has performed live with artists such as Moby and West End Girls. Rickard's father, Rutger Gunnarsson, is one of Sweden's most famous musicians and used to play with ABBA amongst other artists.

Tobias was born and raised in Stockholm, he and Rickard met when they were 15 and started playing together in a band called Enemy Alliance. The music was heavily influenced by bands like Skinny Puppy and Front Line Assembly, and another member of that band was also Eric Prydz. Tobias produced parts of Lowe's album Kino International and is also the producer and keyboard player of Rezonance, which is released by Lowe's own record label Megahype.

Their music has already received national and international recognition. Lowe won the Newcomer Of The Year award at Scandinavian Alternative Music Awards 2005, and was also the only band nominated in three categories, Newcomer Of The Year, Best Song and Best Album.

In 2005 the band contributed to a Camouflage tribute project done by electronic artists called "Strange Thoughts" with the cover of "That Smiling Face", in the song, the voice has such passion, emotion and the right depressive touch, that was acclaimed in the alternative electronic music community.

Tobias Ersson joined Lowe as a full-time member in 2009 after extensive touring with the band as a live keyboardist. Starting from April 2010 Lowe has released several track from their third album Evolver that will be released in 2011.

Their records are released through Lowe's own label Megahype (http://www.megahype.com).

== Members ==
- Leo Josefsson (lead vocals)
- Rickard Gunnarsson (bass guitar, synthesizers & vocals)
- Tobias Ersson (synthesizers & machines)

== Discography ==
- Albums
  - Evolver (2011)
  - Kino International (2008)
  - Tenant Remixed (2007)
  - Tenant Limited (2005)
  - Tenant (2004)
- Singles
  - Mirage Amerika (2012)
  - Breathe In Breathe Out (2011)
  - Live to Love (2010)
  - Adorable (2010)
  - Alone in the Dark (2010)
  - Alpha Bravo (2010)
  - Mirage (2010)
  - Berlin Night Express (2009)
  - A 1000 Miles (2008)
  - My Song (2006)
  - Simplicity (2005)
  - Hear Me Out (2004)
  - Ahead of Our Time (2004)
  - The Vanishing (2003)
