= Come Play with Me =

Come Play with Me may refer to:

- Come Play with Me (1968 film), an Italian drama film
- Come Play with Me (1977 film), a British soft porn film
- Come Play with Me (2021 film), a Mexican supernatural horror film
- Come Play with Me (album), a 1995 album by jazz saxophonist Charles McPherson

== See also ==
- Play with Me (disambiguation)
- Come Play, a 2020 film directed by Jacob Chase
