= Play with Me =

Play with Me may refer to:

Songs

- "Play with Me" (song), a 1989 song by Extreme
- "Play with Me (Jane)", a 1992 song by Thompson Twins
- "Spiel mit Mir" ("Play with Me"), a song by Rammstein from Sehnsucht

Albums

- Play with Me (album), a 2003 album by Lene
- Play with Me, a 2012 album by Nigar Jamal
- You/Play with Me, an EP by Bullet for My Valentine

Other media

- Play with Me, a 1994 performance-art piece by Mariko Mori

== See also ==
- Come Play with Me (disambiguation)
