= Natural Life =

Natural Life were an English band of the early 1990s that are best described as a 'bohemian rock collective', their music is a combination of rock influences and dancefloor beats.

They emerged from London's Balearic dance movement and were quickly caught up in a bidding war between the major record labels. Their early gigs listed venues such as Danny Rampling's fledgling 'Milk Bar' and 'Eat The Worm' at the Hannover Grand, where they were supported by the then unknown Ocean Colour Scene. They were the only London based band to play 'Factory Day' at 'Cities in the Park' with The Happy Mondays, Electronic and A Certain Ratio. This almost exclusively Mancunian mini-festival was a memorial festival for the recently deceased Martin Hannett run by Factory Records.(see Cities in the Park video band list)

The band were signed to an offshoot of Hollywood Records called Tr1be Records. They toured extensively with indie dance act The Farm, and provided support for Seal on his UK tour.

The band's first single "Strange World" was voted 'record of the week' by BBC Radio 1. The second single "Natural Life" received the same accolade two weeks running. Although the band enjoyed a large UK following and were regulars on the festival circuit playing at both the Glastonbury and Reading festivals in the summer of 92, they never managed to break into the mainstream.

The band performed on Channel 4's The Word on 28 February 1992.

Their percussionist Shovell later found fame as a member of M People.

== Members ==
- Jon Spong – Vocals
- Shovell – Percussion
- Darren Hunter – Guitar
- "Liggy" Locko – Guitar
- Mark Matthews – Bass
- Ray Wilson – Keyboards
- 'Big' Sydney Holdforth – Drums
- Hakan Tuna – Keyboards (After Ray Left early 1992)

== Discography ==
=== Singles ===
- "Strange World" (Tr1be Records/Hollywood Records – 1992)
- "The Promise" (12" Hollywood Records. -1991)
- "Passion" (Promo Hollywood Records. )
- "Natural Life"/"As One Alone" (Tr1be Records – 1992) – UK #47

=== Albums ===
- Natural Life
