= Late at Night (Electronic song) =

Single by Electronic

from the album Twisted Tenderness
- B-side: "King for a Day", "Warning Sign"
- Released: 5 July 1999 (UK); 19 July 1999 (EU)
- Recorded: 1998
- Genre: Alternative
- Length: 3:59 (radio edit)
- Label: Parlophone (UK); Virgin (Europe)
- Songwriters: Bernard Sumner, Johnny Marr
- Producers: Bernard Sumner, Johnny Marr, Arthur Baker

Electronic singles chronology
"Make It Happen" (1999)	"Late at Night" (1999)

"Late at Night" is a rock song by the English band Electronic. It was written and produced by its members Bernard Sumner and Johnny Marr, and co-produced with Arthur Baker. "Late at Night" was taken from their third album Twisted Tenderness and was their last single.

== Formats ==
Like its predecessor "Vivid", "Late at Night" was pressed on both 12" and Compact Disc, although this single was withdrawn in the UK. Copies were dispatched to buyers who had pre-ordered it, however, and all three versions of the single are now fairly easy to obtain second-hand. The German CDs, conversely, are very rare.

== B-sides ==
"Late at Night" was backed by two B-sides: "King for a Day" and "Warning Sign". Both songs appeared on the US version of Twisted Tenderness in 2000, and also on the Twisted Tenderness:Deluxe compilation a year later. Remixes of "Make It Happen" (by Darren Price) and "Prodigal Son" (by Cevin Fisher) were the other extra tracks.

"Late at Night" was the only commercial Electronic record which featured the original mix of "Make It Happen", which included an uncleared Ice-T sample.

The single mix of "Late at Night", which is rougher and slightly shorter than the album version, was included on Get the Message - The Best of Electronic in 2006.

== Track listing ==
=== UK 12" ===
1. "Late at Night (Album Version)"
2. "Make It Happen (Original Mix)"
3. "Make It Happen (Darren Price Mix)"

=== UK CD1 ===
1. "Late at Night (Radio Edit)" - 3:59
2. "Warning Sign" - 4:44
3. "Make It Happen (Darren Price Mix)" - 5:55

=== UK CD2 ===
1. "Late at Night (Album Version)" - 4:12
2. "King for a Day" - 4:27
3. "Prodigal Son (Cevin Fisher Mix)" - 8:19

=== EU CD ===
1. "Late at Night (Radio Edit)" - 3:59
2. "King for a Day" - 4:27

=== EU CD maxi single ===
1. "Late at Night (Radio Edit)" - 3:59
2. "King for a Day" - 4:27
3. "Warning Sign" - 4:44
4. "Come Down Now (Cevin Fisher Mix)" - 8:20
5. "Make It Happen (Darren Price Mix)" - 5:55
