= Communication (Karl Bartos album) =

Studio album by Karl Bartos
- Released: 2003
- Recorded: August 2002 – January 2003
- Studios: Home studio, Hamburg
- Genres: Synthpop, electronica
- Length: 45:41
- Labels: Home, Sony, Columbia
- Producer: Karl Bartos

Karl Bartos chronology
Electric Music (1998)	Communication (2003)	Off the Record (2013)

Singles from Communication
- 1. "15 Minutes Of Fame" Released: 2000; 2. "I'm the Message" Released: 2003; 3. "Camera Obscura" Released: 2005; 4. "Life" Released: 2016; 5. "I'm the Message (Matthew Herbert Remix)" Released: 2016

Communication released in 2003, is the first solo album of German electronic musician Karl Bartos.

According to Karl Bartos, the album is a concept album about electronic media:

»Communication« is about the way images shape our view of the world and how electronic media is going to change the contents of our culture"

— Karl Bartos in 2003,

== Release ==
Some editions of the CD come in a special Burgopak-Case, which is unusual in that the CD tray and booklet both emerge sliding out from opposite sides of the case and must be opened together.

The limited edition was issued as CD Extra and contains the video clip for "I'm the Message" as well as a download link for two remixes of the song by Felix Da Housecat and Orbital.

The album was re-released on March 25, 2016, on CD and Vinyl, including remastered tracks and the bonus song "Camera Obscura".

== Reception ==
Professional ratings
Review scores
Source	Rating
AllMusic	3/5 stars
Hour Community	1.5/5 stars
Peek-a-Boo	77/100
Release Magazine	8/10

Sean Carruthers of AllMusic likened Communication to the mid-1980s electro-pop of Orchestral Manoeuvres in the Dark and the Pet Shop Boys, adding that "It would be easy to dismiss the album if it weren't so catchy: no matter how cheeseball and dated a lot of the material here sounds, it sticks in your head."

== Track listing ==
All tracks are written by Karl Bartos, except where noted.

No.	Title	Length
1.	"The Camera"	3:56
2.	"I'm the Message"	5:01
3.	"15 Minutes of Fame" (Bartos/Anthony Rother)	4:10
4.	"Reality"	4:40
5.	"Electronic Apeman"	5:36
6.	"Life"	3:30
7.	"Cyberspace"	6:32
8.	"Interview"	4:43
9.	"Ultraviolet"	4:07
10.	"Another Reality"	3:26

Japanese edition bonus tracks
No.	Title	Length
11.	"I'm the Message (Orbital Mix)"	6:41
12.	"I'm the Message (X-Traterrestial Mix by Felix Da Housecat)"	8:36

2016 Re-issue
No.	Title	Length
10.	"Camera Obscura"	6:31
11.	"Another Reality"	3:26

== Personnel ==
- Karl Bartos – production, vocals, electronic instruments
- Mathias Black – mixing, mastering

== Charts ==
Chart (2003)	Peak position
German Albums (Offizielle Top 100)	85
Swedish Albums (Sverigetopplistan)	30
