= Play with Me (Jane) =

Single by Thompson Twins

from the album Songs from the Cool World
- Released: 3 August 1992 (UK); 8 October 1992 (US)
- Length: 6:15 (full on mix); 3:41 (edit)
- Label: Warner
- Songwriters: Alannah Currie; Tom Bailey
- Producers: Tom Bailey; Alannah Currie

Thompson Twins singles chronology
"Groove On" (1992)	"Play with Me (Jane)" (1992)

"Play with Me (Jane)" is a song from the British pop duo Thompson Twins, which was released in 1992 by Warner Records as a single from Songs from the Cool World, the soundtrack release for the 1992 film Cool World. The song was written and produced by Alannah Currie and Tom Bailey. It peaked at number 85 in the UK Singles Chart.

== Background ==
"Play with Me (Jane)" was derived from "Strange Jane", a track which appeared on the Thompson Twins' 1991 studio album Queer. In 1992, a number of remixes were produced for the track under the new title. One remix was included in the American live-action/animated black comedy fantasy film Cool World and its accompanying soundtrack release in July 1992. The remix included on the soundtrack is not the exact same version heard during the opening credits of the film. "Play with Me (Jane)" was issued as a single in the UK on 3 August 1992, followed by a US release on 8 October 1992.

Much like David Bowie's "Real Cool World", the preceding single from Cool World, "Play with Me (Jane)" did not meet commercial expectations and failed to generate mainstream success. It did not reach the top 75 of the UK Singles Chart, stalling at number 85 in August 1992. However, the song was a hit on the UK club scene, with the "Full On Mix" reaching number 8 in the Record Mirror Club Chart. In the US, the single reached number 5 on the Billboard Hot Dance Breakouts Maxi-Singles Sales chart in October 1992. It also saw chart action on the Street Information Network Top 50 Club Play chart. "Play with Me (Jane)" was the Thompson Twins' last single release. After dropping the name, Bailey and Currie moved to New Zealand and began recording music under the name Babble.

== Critical reception ==
Upon its release as a single, The Arbroath Herald awarded "Play with Me (Jane)" an eight out of ten rating. The reviewer had some reservations on first hearing of the "full on mix", but was "sold" when they heard the "dub wash mix", on which "a compulsive beat [is] at work, with Alannah Currie's gentle, wistful voice carrying the melody along nicely". The reviewer concluded, "Whether or not this is the one to take the Twins back to the high chart positions they used to get regularly, we're not too sure, but it gets our vote." Gina Morris of NME described it as "yet another half-arsed Hippodrome floor filler" from the duo. Brett Anderson of Suede, as guest reviewer for the magazine, added, "Too much time in the studio. If a machine were to write a pop tune it would be this. Rubbish, sorry but it's flippant rubbish." Andrew Smith of Melody Maker remarked, "Last year, the Thompson Twins fooled the DJs when they scored a dance hit under a pseudonym. But they don't fool us. We've got a plan. We won't buy it."

Christian Jakubasczek of the German magazine Frontpage gave the single a three out of five star rating and described the song as "a very okay, driving, not necessarily innovative but acceptable house number". The reviewer felt the song was an "unforeseen comeback" for the Thompson Twins, although they considered "only the 'Play With Me' vocal" to serve as a reminder of the band's former pop work. The reviewer anticipated the song had hit potential on the German club scene. In the US, Larry Flick, writing for Billboard, described "Play with Me (Jane)" as a "techno-houser". He wrote, "Thanks to ethereal vocals by Alannah Currie and creative postproduction by Sinistra, the track smokes with potential at both rave and pop/house levels." Flick described the "Full On Mix" as "harsh and invigorating," and the "African NCP Mix" as having "a more cushiony bottom and hip tribal chants".

== Formats ==
7-inch single (UK)
No.	Title	Notes	Length
1.	"Play with Me (Jane)"	7" Edit	3:41
2.	"Play with Me (Jane)"	Full On Piano Edit	3:44

12-inch single (UK)
No.	Title	Notes	Length
1.	"Play with Me (Jane)"	Full On Mix	6:15
2.	"Play with Me (Jane)"	Dub Wash Mix	7:11

12-inch promotional single (UK)
No.	Title	Notes	Length
1.	"Play with Me (Jane)"	African NCP Mix	6:53
2.	"Play with Me (Jane)"	Sweet Garage Mix	5:46
3.	"Play with Me (Jane)"	Full On Piano Edit	3:44

CD single (Germany)
No.	Title	Notes	Length
1.	"Play with Me (Jane)"	7" Edit	3:41
2.	"Play with Me (Jane)"	Full On Mix	6:15
3.	"Play with Me (Jane)"	Dub Wash Mix	7:11
4.	"Play with Me (Jane)"	African NCP Mix	6:53
5.	"Play with Me (Jane)"	Full On Piano Edit	3:44
6.	"Play with Me (Jane)"	Sweet Garage Mix	5:46

12-inch single (US)
No.	Title	Notes	Length
1.	"Play with Me (Jane)"	Full On Mix	6:13
2.	"Play with Me (Jane)"	Dub Wash Mix	7:10
3.	"Play with Me (Jane)"	African NCP Mix	6:50
4.	"The Saint"	Feedback Max Remix	6:53
5.	"The Saint"	Feedback Max Hard Groove Mix	5:40
6.	"Play with Me (Jane)"	Sweet Garage Mix	5:45

CD single (US)
No.	Title	Notes	Length
1.	"Play with Me (Jane)"	Single Edit	3:41
2.	"Play with Me (Jane)"	Full On Mix	6:15
3.	"The Saint"	Feedback Max Remix Edit	3:33
4.	"Play with Me (Jane)"	Sweet Garage Mix	5:46
5.	"The Saint"	Feedback Max Remix	6:53
6.	"The Saint"	Feedback Max Hard Groove Mix	5:40
7.	"Play with Me (Jane)"	Full On Piano Edit	3:44
8.	"Play with Me (Jane)"	Album Version	3:59

== Personnel ==
Credits are adapted from the German and US CD single liner notes.

Musicians

- Tom Bailey – bass, guitar, keyboards, vocals
- Alannah Currie – drums, percussion, vocals

Production

- Tom Bailey – production
- Alannah Currie – production
- Keith Fernley – engineering
- Sinistra – remixer ("Full On Mix", "Sweet Garage Mix", "Full On Piano Edit")
- Tom & Jonna (for Sinistra) – remixers ("Dub Wash Mix")
- Feedback Max – additional production and remixes ("The Saint")

Other

- Mike Owen – photography
- M@ Maitland – sleeve

== Charts ==
=== Weekly charts ===
Chart (1992)	Peak position
UK Singles (OCC)	85
UK Dance (Music Week)	22
UK Club Chart (Music Week)	8
US Hot Dance Breakouts Maxi-Singles Sales (Billboard)	5

=== Year-end charts ===
Chart (1992)	Position
UK Club Chart (Music Week)	91
