= Cool World (soundtrack) =

Songs from the Cool World

Soundtrack album by various artists
- Released: July 14, 1992
- Genres: Dance, techno, rock, acid house, synth-pop
- Length: 69:26
- Label: Warner Bros.
- Producer: Various

Singles from Songs from the Cool World
- 1. "Disappointed" Released: 22 June 1992; 2. "Real Cool World" Released: 10 August 1992; 3. "Play with Me (Jane)" Released: 8 October 1992

Professional ratings
Review scores
Source	Rating
Allmusic	4/5 stars

Songs from the Cool World is the soundtrack album for the 1992 Ralph Bakshi film Cool World and features songs from David Bowie, Thompson Twins, Moby, and other dance and rock artists from the time. The 15 tracks included on the CD release are trimmed to 11 on the vinyl version.

The soundtrack would go on to chart in the Billboard 200. Unlike the movie, the soundtrack received more favorable reviews from critics.

In 2019, Warner Bros. Records reissued the album as a double-LP set containing the complete 15-song track list, in standard black and "flesh-colored" editions.

== Tracklist ==
=== CD tracklist ===
No.	Title	Performed by	Length
1.	"Real Cool World"	David Bowie	5:24
2.	"Play with Me"	Thompson Twins	4:06
3.	"Disappointed" (Featuring Neil Tennant)	Electronic	4:22
4.	"Papua New Guinea" (7" Original Mix)	The Future Sound of London	3:49
5.	"N.W.O."	Ministry	5:30
6.	"The Witch"	The Cult	7:03
7.	"Sex on Wheelz" (Glamour Dyke Mix)	My Life with the Thrill Kill Kult	4:00
8.	"Ah-Ah" (Mix 1)	Moby	3:30
9.	"Mindless"	Mindless	4:03
10.	"Next Is the E" (Long Arms Mix)	Moby	4:40
11.	"Do That Thang" (Polite Mix)	Da Juice	5:22
12.	"Her Sassy Kiss"	My Life with the Thrill Kill Kult	3:51
13.	"Greedy"	Pure	4:46
14.	"Under"	Brian Eno	5:19
15.	"Industry and Seduction"	Tom Bailey	3:22
Total length:			69:26

=== LP tracklist ===
==== Side A ====
No.	Title	Performed by	Length
1.	"Real Cool World"	David Bowie	5:24
2.	"Play with Me"	Thompson Twins	4:06
3.	"Disappointed" (Featuring Neil Tennant)	Electronic	4:22
4.	"Papua New Guinea" (7" Original Mix)	The Future Sound of London	3:49
5.	"The Witch"	The Cult	7:03

==== Side B ====
No.	Title	Performed by	Length
6.	"N.W.O."	Ministry	5:30
7.	"Sex on Wheelz" (Glamour Dyke Mix)	My Life with the Thrill Kill Kult	4:00
8.	"Ah-Ah" (Mix 1)	Moby	3:30
9.	"Industry and Seduction"	Tom Bailey	3:22
10.	"Next Is the E" (Long Arms Mix)	Moby	4:40
11.	"Under"	Brian Eno	5:19

=== Other songs ===
- "My Ideal", performed by Maurice Chevalier
- "The Devil Goes Drugs", performed by My Life with the Thrill Kill Kult
- "Holli's Groove", performed by My Life with the Thrill Kill Kult (Retitled version of "Strippers Only")
- "Sesusa", performed by My Life with the Thrill Kill Kult (Retitled version of "The Smash-Up")
- "Let's Make Love", performed by Kim Basinger and Frank Sinatra Jr. (Not included in the soundtrack)
- "That Old Black Magic", performed by Frank Sinatra Jr.

== Charts ==
Chart (1992)	Peak position
US Billboard 200	89
