= Esperanto (Elektric Music album) =

Studio album by Elektric Music
- Released: 1993
- Genre: Synth-pop; techno
- Length: 43:43
- Label: SPV
- Producer: Karl Bartos

Elektric Music chronology
Esperanto (1993)	Electric Music (1998)

Singles from Esperanto
- 1. "Crosstalk" Released: 1992; 2. "Lifestyle" Released: 1993; 3. "TV" Released: 1993

Esperanto, released in 1993, was the first studio album by Elektric Music, initially a collaboration of Karl Bartos (formerly of Kraftwerk) and Lothar Manteuffel (formerly of Rheingold), but later only Bartos worked under this name. The project begun after Bartos ended his involvement with Kraftwerk in 1991. The songs "Show Business" and "Kissing the Machine" were co-written with Andy McCluskey of Orchestral Manoeuvres in the Dark, with McCluskey performing vocals on the latter track. "Crosstalk" and "Overdrive" were co-written with Kraftwerk associate Emil Schult, who was also the art director of the cover graphics of the early Elektric Music releases. About half the songs are similar to Kraftwerk, and the others more to contemporary techno.

== Reception ==
Professional ratings
Review scores
Source	Rating
Allmusic	4/5 stars

Allmusic gives the album a four out of five star rating, commenting "A fine slice of electronica, Esperanto demonstrates that in 1993, the teacher was quite willing to learn some things from his students."

== Track listing ==
No.	Title	Writer(s)	Length
1.	"TV"	Karl Bartos, Lothar Manteuffel	5:44
2.	"Show Business"	Bartos, Manteuffel, Andy McCluskey	3:20
3.	"Kissing the Machine"	Bartos, McCluskey	5:05
4.	"Lifestyle"	Bartos	4:46
5.	"Crosstalk"	Bartos, Manteuffel, Emil Schult	5:52
6.	"Information"	Bartos	8:35
7.	"Esperanto"	Bartos	4:41
8.	"Overdrive"	Bartos, Schult	5:23

Bonus tracks for the Japanese remastered reissue (1999).
No.	Title	Writer(s)	Length
9.	"Lifestyle" (Radio-Style)	Bartos	3:42
10.	"Lifestyle" (Club-Style)	Bartos	6:02
11.	"Lifestyle" (Phoneme-Style)	Bartos	3:35
12.	"Lifestyle" (Edit-Style)	Bartos	7:32
13.	"Crosstalk-Intercomix"	Bartos, Manteuffel, Schult	4:08
14.	"Baby Come Back"	Eddy Grant	4:13

== Release history ==
Region	Date	Label	Format	Catalog
Germany	1993	SPV	limited edition CD in digipack	SPV 084-92892
Germany	1993	SPV	CD in jewel case	SPV 084-92832
Europe	1993	East West	CD	4509-92999-2
United States	1993	Atlantic	CD	82604-2
Japan	1999	Nippon Crown	CD, remastered, with 6 bonus tracks, titled Esperanto_plus	CRCL-4711
