= Queer (Thompson Twins album) =

Studio album by Thompson Twins
- Released: 24 September 1991
- Studios: The Sugar Shack, London
- Genres: Alternative rock; post-punk
- Length: 47:48
- Label: Warner Bros.
- Producers: Tom Bailey, Alannah Currie, Keith Fernley

Thompson Twins chronology
Big Trash (1989)	Queer (1991)	Greatest Hits (1996)

Singles from Queer
- 1. "Come Inside" Released: August 1991; 2. "The Saint" Released: January 1992 (UK); 3. "Groove On" Released: February 1992 (US); 4. "Play with Me (Jane)" Released: July 1992

Queer is the eighth and final studio album by the English pop group Thompson Twins, which was released in 1991 by Warner Bros.

Queer was the second album for the Warner Bros. label, following the 1989 album Big Trash. Although the previous album was not a major commercial success, it did spawn the Top 30 hit "Sugar Daddy" in the US. Before the release of Queer, it appeared as if the band was on the verge of commercial rebirth. Tom Bailey and engineer Keith Fernley had been experimenting with making dance music under the moniker "Feedback Max". As such, the group slipped several white-label 12-inch singles to London disc jockeys, the most successful of which was a track called "Come Inside". The rave-style record became massively popular, and charted high on the playlists of influential DJs. Most of the Feedback Max records, including "Come Inside", were actually remixes of tracks that had been intended for the next Thompson Twins album. When "Come Inside" was issued as an official Thompson Twins release, the record was immediately ignored, as it stalled at number 56 on the UK Singles Chart. Consequently, the British release of Queer was cancelled.

The album was released in the United States and Germany in September 1991. Warner Bros. tried a similar marketing approach in the US: Pre-release radio singles were shipped to station programmers in a paper zip-apart sleeve that said simply "Come Inside". A question mark appeared in place of the artist's name. The official single was released, but it was only successful on the Billboard dance charts. It was also popular within gay clubs. This modest success prompted Warner Bros. to issue a second single, "Groove On", despite the fact that remixes already existed for another album track, "Flower Girl". The former failed to make an impact. However, in the UK, "The Saint" was released as the second single from the album; it reached number 53.

In 1992, the Thompson Twins appeared on the soundtrack of the Ralph Bakshi film Cool World with a mostly-instrumental piece titled "Play With Me"; it was actually a remix of the song "Strange Jane" from Queer. Warner Bros. then released the track as an official Thompson Twins single, now called "Play With Me (Jane)", but the Cool World version of the song was not released as a single, even on the maxi-single format. Although "Play With Me (Jane)" did not make the UK Top 75, as with the other UK releases, it was a modest hit on the UK Dance Chart, reaching number 15.

Following the release of Queer, the band changed their name to Babble and moved deeper into electronica, released by Warner Bros.' sister label Reprise. The group released two subsequent albums: The Stone and Ether.

== Background ==
The album was recorded by the duo at their own Sugar Shack Studio in London during a seven-month period beginning in the summer of 1990.

The name of the album and title track was suggested by Bailey to "prove a point" and is based on the Edith Sitwell ode "Waltz". The title caused some objection from the Thompson Twins' record label but Bailey revealed that he found the controversy "quite refreshing." In a 1991 interview with The Advocate, Bailey explained the idea behind the title: "Are the Thompson Twins passionate and sexual? Sort of. Are we queer? Yes. Alannah and I are taking the word back. It's not the same point Boy George was proving with Absolute Queer; but, it's close. Its amazing how many buttons this title has pushed, we were kind of hoping that would happen. Queer is such a powerful word. And yet it still shocks me how people get so uptight over it. Sitwell and our song say, "The hell with what you think is right." Queer is not a gay word. It's a political word, a word people use to call someone who isn't normal. I am trying to say that it's a word about freedom. It should not be a pejorative."

The album attempted to be a departure from what Bailey described as "safe pop music". He described the meaning of the lead single "Come Inside" to The Advocate: "It's about a breakthrough between two people, the act of penetration. But the song is inspired by William Blake's poem "The Doors of Deception," which, as Blake wrote are hard to open wide. It's amazing how people are not willing to open their minds, but are more than ready to open their legs."

In the official Warner Bros. press kit release for the album, Queer was described as "a dazzling exercise in the fine art of the unexpected, the eleven cuts that comprise the Twins latest outing offer no signposts, pigeon holes or traditional comforts to guide you through its maze of whims, obsessions and prismatic fantasies. Mystifying, mercurial, purely magical, Queer is the reward that awaits those for whom mere explanation is never quite enough."

== Critical reception ==
Professional ratings
Review scores
Source	Rating
AllMusic	2/5 stars
Entertainment Weekly	C+
The Rolling Stone Album Guide	2.5/5 stars
Select	2/5 stars
Tampa Bay Times	3/5 stars

Upon release, Larry Flick of Billboard felt the album showed the duo "continu[ing] to prove their knack for combining tightly constructed pop hooks with tasty, funk-rooted dance grooves". He added: "Bailey and Currie take the listener on a fascinating journey. Though not necessarily a hardcore club album on the surface, Queer jams harder than most of the more obvious competition." Armond White of Entertainment Weekly wrote: "In Queer, their bland "sonic groove" could be tagged middle-of-the-rut. The Twins are too stiff to pull off something called "My Funky Valentine"; they're still wedding arch-rock to a two-step rhythm. The best cuts are toss-offs, "Shake It Down" and "Wind It Up" both bouncy, simple ditties sweetened by Currie's girl-group-style backing vocals."

John Lannert of the Sun-Sentinel wrote: "By far the Twins' best outing in years, Queer is replete with pumping, thumping techno-jams that recall Deee-Lite and Scritti Politti." Jeff Jacks of the Tampa Bay Times wrote: "Never mind the early kiddie-pop success of the Thompson Twins and their silly videos; recall instead just how catchy "Hold Me Now" really was. The Twins have a few more tunes of that calibre here on Queer."

In a retrospective review, Stephen Thomas Erlewine of AllMusic called Queer "an ambitious effort, but it isn't entirely successful", noting that "you can hear the group work to re-establish themselves as artists." Ira Robbins of Trouser Press considered the album a "largely successful return to the Twins' bouncy appeal", adding: "There is a dark, edgy undercurrent to Bailey's singing, but the album's general tone is upbeat, atmospheric and clubby."

== Track listing ==
1. "Come Inside" – 3:58
2. "Flower Girl" – 4:16
3. "My Funky Valentine" – 3:22
4. "Queer" – 3:19
5. "Groove On" – 3:54
6. "Strange Jane" – 4:00
7. "Shake It Down" – 3:31
8. "Wind It Up" – 4:17
9. "Flesh and Blood" – 3:47
10. "The Invisible Man" – 2:33
11. "The Saint" – 4:33
12. "Come Inside" (Feedback Max Remix) – 6:27

== Personnel ==
Thompson Twins

- Tom Bailey – keyboards, vocals, violin, contrabassoon, nagaswaram, tabla, bina drums
- Alannah Currie – percussion, vocals, guitar, cello, drums

Additional personnel

- Keith Fernley – additional guitar

Production

- Alannah Currie, Tom Bailey – producers
- Keith Fernley – assistant producer
- Henry Binns – assistant mixer

Other

- John Warwicker – design
- Mike Owen – photography

== Charts ==
Chart performance for Queer
Chart (1991)	Peak position
Australian Albums (ARIA)	193
