= The Saint (Thompson Twins song) =

Single by Thompson Twins

from the album Queer
- Released: 1992
- Length: 6:53 ("Feedback Max Remix"); 4:32 (LP version)
- Label: Warner
- Songwriter(s): Tom Bailey; Alannah Currie
- Producer(s): Tom Bailey; Alannah Currie

Thompson Twins singles chronology
"Come Inside" (1991)	"The Saint" (1992)	"Groove On" (1992)

"The Saint" is a song from the British pop duo Thompson Twins, which was released in 1992 as the second single from eighth studio album Queer. The song was written and produced by Tom Bailey and Alannah Currie.

"The Saint" was originally distributed to DJs on white label before receiving a single release by Warner. In addition to its success on the UK dance and club scene, the single reached number 53 in the UK Singles Chart and remained in the top 100 for two weeks.

== Critical reception ==
Upon its release as a single, James Hamilton, writing for the Record Mirror update in Music Week, described "The Saint" as a "Alannah Currie cooed and Tom Bailey muttered mushily churning chugger". He described the "Feedback Max Remix" as "sombre piano plonked", the "Feedback Max Hard Groove" as "synth washed", the "LP Version" as "guitar yowled bounc[y] pop" and noted that David Morales' remixes were "more sparsely throbbing". Terry Staunton of NME stated, "Gone are the days of the poorly drawn cartoon pop and Alannah Currie's silly hats. Instead, the Thommos are now dabbling in House styles and not making that bad a job of it. True to form, nobody has a bloody clue what they're on about, but if this was a little less wishy-washy it could pass for anything on the Saint Etienne album."

The Arbroath Herald awarded "The Saint" an eight out of ten rating. The reviewer noted that the duo had jumped on the "dance" bandwagon as it is like "so many other dance singles" of the time and they also believed it had a degree of anonymity as "the intro give no clues as to who is going to sing, with its typical and anonymous dance track piano". However, they concluded that "if the influential radio DJs pick this one up, it could well be the Twins' biggest hit since the mid-'80s". Accrington Observer gave a three out of five star rating and wrote, "It begins with Enigma-ish synths, Alannah has a few breathy vocals and Tom repeats 'I'm praying to the saint of the groove' numerous times. In spite of this I have a feeling it could be a hit."

== Formats ==
7-inch and cassette single (UK)
No.	Title	Notes	Length
1.	"The Saint"	Feedback Max Remix Edit	3:33
2.	"The Saint"	Feedback Max Hard Groove	5:40

12-inch single (UK)
No.	Title	Notes	Length
1.	"The Saint"	Feedback Max Remix	6:53
2.	"The Saint"	Feedback Max Hard Groove	5:40
3.	"The Saint"	LP Version	4:30
4.	"The Saint"	Def Sonic 12" Mix	7:46
5.	"The Saint"	Red Zone Dub	5:32
6.	"The Saint"	8th Street Dub	5:32

CD single (UK and Europe)
No.	Title	Notes	Length
1.	"The Saint"	Feedback Max Remix Edit	3:35
2.	"The Saint"	Feedback Max Remix	6:55
3.	"The Saint"	Feedback Max Hard Groove	5:43
4.	"The Saint"	LP Version	4:32
5.	"The Saint"	Def Sonic 12" Mix	7:48
6.	"The Saint"	Red Zone Dub	5:35
7.	"The Saint"	8th Street Dub	5:33

== Personnel ==
Credits are adapted from UK/European CD single liner notes.

Production

- Tom Bailey, Alannah Currie – producers
- Keith Fernley – engineer
- Feedback Max – additional production and remixes ("Feedback Max Remix" and "Feedback Max Hard Groove")
- David Morales – additional production and remixes ("Def Sonic 12" Mix", "Red Zone Dub" and "8th Street Dub")
- Henry Binns – mixing assistant on "LP Version"

Other

- Mike Owen – photography
- Matt Maitland – sleeve

== Charts ==
Chart (1992)	Peak position
UK Singles (OCC)	53
UK Club Chart (Record Mirror)	14
UK Cool Cuts (Record Mirror)	9
UK Top 60 Dance Singles (Music Week)	16
