= Tighten Up (Electronic song) =

Single by Electronic

from the album Electronic
- Released: July 1991
- Recorded: 1990
- Genre: Madchester
- Label: Warner Bros. (United States)
- Songwriter(s): Bernard Sumner, Johnny Marr
- Producer(s): Bernard Sumner, Johnny Marr

Electronic singles chronology
"Get the Message" (1991)	"Tighten Up" (1991)	"Feel Every Beat" (1991)

"Tighten Up" is a song by the British band Electronic. Written, performed and produced by its two members Bernard Sumner and Johnny Marr, it appeared as the third track on their debut album Electronic in May 1991 and was also a promotional single in the United States. Donald Johnson from A Certain Ratio contributed drums to the song.

Combining electric guitars with a bouncy synthesiser riff, "Tighten Up" is representative of the Electronic album. When issued as a promo in the USA it reached #6 on Billboard's Modern Rock Tracks chart. "Feel Every Beat" would become the next physical single release worldwide.

The single edit is one minute shorter than the album version; the opening bars and the instrumental section are both edited. The song also fades out on a loop whereas the original has a hard ending.

== Critical reception ==
Writing in Melody Maker, Paul Lester described the song as "the devastating marriage of Smiths guitars and New Order technology that nervously excited fans the globe over were anticipating from Electronic. Imagine a sublime splicing of 'Bigmouth Strikes Again' and 'Dream Attack', then multiply by 12". In Vox Keith Cameron wrote: "'Tighten Up' gives Marr a chance to relive The Smiths' halcyon days with an exhilarating semi-acoustic dynamism".

Illusionist David Copperfield used the song during his live shows when he would leave the stage to look for audience members to participate in his show.

== Track listing ==
1. Single edit – 3:36
2. Album version – 4:37

== Charts ==
Chart (1991)	Peak position
US Alternative Airplay (Billboard)	6
