= Come Inside (song) =

Single by Thompson Twins

from the album Queer
- B-side: "The Saint"
- Released: 1991
- Genre: Alternative dance; House (Feedback Max House Mix)
- Length: 3:57
- Label: Warner Bros.
- Songwriter(s): Alannah Currie; Tom Bailey
- Producer(s): Alannah Currie; Tom Bailey

Thompson Twins singles chronology
"Bombers In The Sky" (1989)	"Come Inside" (1991)	"The Saint" (1992)

"Come Inside" is a song by British pop group Thompson Twins, released in 1991 by Warner Bros. as the lead single from their eighth and final studio album, Queer (1991). It was written and produced by Alannah Currie and Tom Bailey. The single peaked at No. 56 in the UK and spent four weeks on the chart. The single also peaked at No. 7 on the US Billboard Dance Music/Club Play Singles Chart. The single had a music video filmed to promote it.

== Background ==
Speaking of the song's meaning, Bailey told The Advocate in 1991, "It's about a breakthrough between two people, the act of penetration. The song is inspired by William Blake's poem 'The Doors of Deception,' which, as Blake wrote, are hard to open wide. It's amazing how people are not willing to open their minds, but are more than ready to open their legs."

== Release ==
"Come Inside" was initially released in the UK under the moniker 'Feedback Max feat. T.T.' to disguise the identity of the band to club DJs. In a 1991 interview with Kiss FM, Bailey explained the thinking behind hiding the Thompson Twins name on the single:

"I did a remix [which] was put out first on a white label format credited to Feedback Max. Why? Because... I guess, in a way, we were trying to do something underhand; we were trying to slip in unnoticed into the clubs, which is sometimes a fun thing to do – to wear a disguise. So then people are judging the piece of work rather than the reputation of the people who made it. Sometimes people can hold your reputation against you and we wanted to avoid that with this song. Some people have this prejudice problem – they think, 'if it's them, then I'm not interested' – but when they realised they'd been dancing to it for a couple of weeks already anyway, they had to come to terms with their own prejudice. In the end, we released a version by C&C. It seems to be taking off club-wise really well for us."

== Critical reception ==
Upon its release, Billboard magazine described "Come Inside" as a "moody and rhythmic pop confection". They added, "Its reliable knack for crafting clever lyrics and insinuating hooks makes this a good best for attention at top 40, modern rock, and club levels. Tom Bailey's voice has never sounded better." The radio industry trade publication The Network Forty considered the song "catchy" and noted that Thompson Twins "are back and stronger than ever".

Simon Price of Melody Maker felt it showed the Thompson Twins had "gone baggy" which "means a C&C Music Factory remix and lines like 'close your eyes, kiss the sky'". He concluded, "As embarrassing as seeing your parents dancing to House music, as convincing as a Linda McCartney techno-bleep project. Hilarious." Simon Williams of NME wrote, "If Electronic had made 'Come Inside', relatively sane people would indeed be ejaculating forth within the confines of their cotton briefs. Alas, it's only those sad old Thompson Twins getting all dancey."

In a review of Queer, Larry Flick of Billboard stated: "The first single "Come Inside" sets the mood nicely with its slow and sleazy rhythms and sing-along chorus". Ira Robbins of the Trouser Press Record Guide said: "There is a dark, edgy undercurrent to Bailey's singing - like eau de Foetus, diluted to a safe concentration - and in the arrangements of songs like Come Inside, Groove On and The Saint, but the album's general tone is upbeat, atmospheric and clubby."

== Formats ==
- 7-inch single
1. "Come Inside (C & C Club Mix Edit)" - 3:20
2. "Come Inside (Feedback Max House Mix Edit)" - 4:04
- 12-inch single
1. "Come Inside (C & C Club Mix Edit)" - 3:20
2. "Come Inside (Feedback Max House Mix)" - 5:53
- 12-inch single (US only)
1. "Come Inside (Turn The Knob Mix)" - 10:10
2. "Come Inside (Feedback Max Chill Out Remix)" - 6:25
3. "Come Inside (Feedback Max House Mix)" - 5:51
4. "The Saint (Def Sonic 12" Mix)" - 7:46
5. "The Saint (Red Zone Dub)" - 5:32
6. "The Saint (8th Street Dub)" - 5:32
- Double 12-inch gatefold single (US only)
1. "Come Inside (Turn The Knob Mix)" - 10:10
2. "Come Inside (Dub Inside)" - 5:00
3. "Come Inside (Feedback Max Chill Out Remix)" - 6:25
4. "Come Inside (Rock A Dub)" - 8:04
5. "Come Inside (Alternative 12" Remix)" - 5:26
6. "Come Inside (Single Edit)" - 3:58
7. "Come Inside (Feedback Max House Mix)" - 5:51
8. "Come Inside (Feedback Max Dub)" - 4:04
- CD single
1. "Come Inside (C+C Club Mix Edit)" - 3:20
2. "Come Inside (Feedback Max House Mix)" - 5:53
3. "Come Inside (LP Version)" - 3:57
- CD single (US only)
1. "Come Inside (Single Edit)" - 3:58
2. "Come Inside (Turn The Knob Mix)" - 10:10
3. "Come Inside (Feedback Max Chill Out Remix)" - 6:25
4. "The Saint (Def Sonic 12" Mix)" - 7:46
5. "The Saint (Red Zone Dub)" - 5:32
6. "Come Inside (Feedback Max House Mix)" - 5:51
7. "Come Inside (Turn The Knob Edit)" - 3:57
- CD single (US promo)
1. "Come Inside" - 4:00

== Personnel ==
- Editor – George Morel, Ricky Crespo
- Recording Engineer, Mixer – Lloyd Puckitt
- Additional Producer – Feedback Max, George Morel, Ricky Crespo
- Assistant Producer – Keith Fernley
- Producer, Writer, Vocals – Alannah Currie, Tom Bailey
- Design – Graham Wood, John Warwicker
- Recording Engineer, Mixer – John Poppo
- Photography – Mike Owen
- Additional Producer, Remixer – David Morales

== Charts ==
Chart (1991)	Peak position
Australia (ARIA)	149
UK Singles (OCC)	56
UK Dance (Music Week)	18
US Dance Music/Club Play Singles (Billboard)	7
US Hot Dance Music/Maxi-Singles Sales (Billboard)	13
