= Getting Away with It =

1989 Single by Electronic

- Cover of UK 7-inch single

Single by Electronic

from the album Electronic (1994 reissue)
- B-side: "Lucky Bag"
- Released: 4 December 1989
- Genre: Pop; disco
- Label: Factory
- Songwriters: Bernard Sumner; Johnny Marr; Neil Tennant
- Producers: Bernard Sumner; Johnny Marr; Neil Tennant

Electronic singles chronology
"Getting Away with It" (1989)	"Get the Message" (1991)

Music video
- "Getting Away With It - Electronic" on YouTube

"Getting Away with It" is a song by the English band Electronic, which comprised Bernard Sumner of New Order, ex-Smiths guitarist Johnny Marr, and guesting vocalist Neil Tennant of the Pet Shop Boys. It was first released as Electronic's first single in 1989.

== Composition ==
Musically, Bernard Sumner wrote the verse and Johnny Marr wrote the chorus. The lyrics, co-written by Tennant with Sumner, are a parody of Marr's Smiths partner Morrissey, and his public persona as morose and masochistic (Pet Shop Boys would further satirise this trend on their 1990 song "Miserablism"). Morrissey, for his part, criticised the song in a 1991 interview, calling it "totally useless" and joking that the song had a "very apt title".

In a 2021 interview with Music Radar, Marr revealed that Chris Lowe also worked on the track, citing the bassline as his work. ABC and The The drummer David Palmer programmed the track's drums.

The fluid, rich production incorporates a full orchestra (conducted by Art of Noise's Anne Dudley) and a rare guitar solo by Marr, while the three remixes that appeared on the two UK 12-inch releases take in disparate musical styles like disco and acid house.

== Single ==
"Getting Away with It" was first issued by Factory Records in the United Kingdom in December 1989, and released the following year in the rest of the world. It appeared on 7-inch, 12-inch, CD and cassette. The primary B-side was an instrumental called "Lucky Bag", the only unadulterated reflection of Marr and Sumner's early, shared enthusiasm for Italo house. This song was also remixed and released on the UK maxi single.

As well as the single edit and three 12-inch remixes, "Getting Away with It" was released as an instrumental; as an unedited, longer version; and in its early form before Dudley's strings were added (this is the only version of the song which has yet to be released on Compact Disc; the 7-inch edit was included on both the US and UK CD singles despite being labelled "Full Length Version"). The Full Length Version on the 12-inch vinyl version is 5:14—as used on the 1994 CD re-issue of the album. The 7-inch mix is just the "Full Length Version" faded out before the strings outro.

== Artwork ==
The single's cover was designed by Peter Saville, who used an elegant stock photo of a glass of whisky. The title was originally written in sentence case, just as Pet Shop Boys songs are. The photograph was inverted for the second UK 12-inch, with the typeface from the Panasonic logo appropriated for the band's name. This arrangement was used for the US editions of the single in 1990.

== Reception ==
Ben Thompson in NME wrote "The most complete pop record of the week, by an infinite margin...A lovely airy melody drifts in and out of the song; gently weighted with obtuse, lovelorn one-liners...The record somehow manages to be much more than the sum of its parts and stubbornly refuses to give up its element of mystery". In Sounds Damon Wise wrote: "It's nothing shocking, nothing that surprising, it's just that every time you think you're tired of it you can't help flipping back the stylus to catch that chorus". Melody Maker's observer Mick Mercer expressed the similar opinion about fall short of expectations and complained about lack of charm of Sumner's voice. However, he concluded that the single was "better than New Order, worse than Pet Shop Boys, with Marr conspicuous by his abstinence". The song remains Electronic's biggest-selling single, shipping 350,000 copies in the US and reaching the UK top 20.

== Music videos ==
Two music videos were made for "Getting Away with It". The first, directed by Chris Marker and produced by Michael H. Shamberg for European use in 1989, featured Sumner, Marr and Tennant in a studio environment miming to the single edit of the song. Additional footage of Marker's muse Catherine Belkhodja, strolling among peacocks through Paris Zoo and also singing to the track, was left out. The second video, shot in 1990, was made for the US release. Sumner and Tennant appeared, alternately, against a series of coloured background, with artistic effects superimposed. Two women's faces are also panned across in close-up. The later version is available on the 2006 Get the Message DVD.

== Live performances ==
"Getting Away with It" was played live in August 1990 at Dodger Stadium in Los Angeles — when Electronic supported Depeche Mode on their World Violation Tour for two dates at the venue — at the Cities in the Park event in Manchester a year later, and at Wembley Hall One in December 1991. Pet Shop Boys guested on all these performances.

"Getting Away With It" is a common part of Johnny Marr's live sets, and in July 2013 Sumner joined Marr at Jodrell Bank to perform the song. In April 2024, Marr was joined on stage in London by Neil Tennant.

== Track listings ==
UK 7-inch

1. "Getting Away with It" (edit)
2. "Lucky Bag" (edit)

UK 12-inch and cassette

1. "Getting Away with It" (extended) – 7:33
2. "Getting Away with It" (full-length version) – 5:14
3. "Lucky Bag" – 5:40

UK 12-inch maxi-single

1. "Getting Away with It" (Vocal remix) – 4:48
2. "Getting Away with It" (Nude mix) – 6:01
3. "Lucky Bag" (Miami edit) – 4:30
4. "Getting Away with It" (original version) – 4:23

UK CD

1. "Getting Away with It" (full length) – 4:23
2. "Getting Away with It" (instrumental) – 5:13
3. "Getting Away with It" (extended version) – 7:33

US 12-inch maxi single

1. "Getting Away with It" (extended) – 7:30
2. "Getting Away with It" (instrumental) – 5:13
3. "Getting Away with It" (Nude mix) – 6:01
4. "Getting Away with It" (Vocal remix) - 4:48
5. "Lucky Bag" (Miami edit) – 4:30

US CD and cassette maxi-single

1. "Getting Away with It" (full length) – 4:19
2. "Getting Away with It" (extended) – 7:30
3. "Getting Away with It" (instrumental) – 5:11
4. "Lucky Bag" – 5:40
5. "Getting Away with It" (Nude mix) – 6:01
6. "Getting Away with It" (Vocal remix) - 4:48
7. "Lucky Bag" (Miami edit) – 4:30

== Charts ==
Chart (1989–1990)	Peak position
Australia (ARIA)	40
Canada Top Singles (RPM)	75
Canada Dance/Urban (RPM)	23
New Zealand (Recorded Music NZ)	32
UK Singles (Official Charts)	12
UK Indie (Official Charts)	1
US Billboard Hot 100	38
US Dance Club Play (Billboard)	7
US Modern Rock Tracks (Billboard)	4
US Cash Box Top 100	31

Chart (2014)	Peak position
UK Physical Singles (Official Charts)	79

== Certifications ==
Certifications for "Getting Away with It"
Region	Certification	Certified units/sales
United Kingdom (BPI)	Silver	200,000^{‡}
^{‡} Sales+streaming figures based on certification alone.

== Appearances ==
Although the music was written with their first album in mind — and before their involvement with Neil Tennant — "Getting Away with It" was not included on Electronic's first LP in May 1991 (a reflection of their confidence in the newer material), although it was slotted in between tracks 4 and 5 on the international versions and the subsequent 1994 reissue on Parlophone, to bolster sales. In some territories "Getting Away with It" replaced the album track "Gangster".

"Getting Away with It" also appeared on the Australian "Forbidden City" CD single in 1996, and in two versions on a withdrawn compilation planned for release in Japan three years later. It has also featured on a variety of various artists compilations, sometimes in remixed form, and was the second track on the retrospective set Get the Message – The Best of Electronic in 2006.

== Additional information ==
The song was recorded by British artist Skin for inclusion on the re-release of her debut album Fleshwounds. Unlike the original, the music was updated to a more rock-edged sound. It has since become a fan favourite at her gigs and is never left out of a setlist. A double A-side of the song was to be released with her single "Lost", but due to poor sales of the album and singles it was pulled by EMI at the last minute. No video was shot for the song.

The phrase 'getting away with this' was used in a Spitting Image spoof of Pet Shop Boys in 1993.
