= Real Cool World =

Song by David Bowie

Single by David Bowie

from the album Songs from the Cool World
- B-side: "Real Cool World" (instrumental)
- Released: 10 August 1992
- Recorded: June/July 1992
- Studio: 38 Fresh (original writing & recording), Los Angeles; Mountain Studios, Montreux; Hit Factory, New York City
- Genre: Rock
- Length: 4:15
- Label: Warner Bros.
- Songwriter: David Bowie
- Producer: Nile Rodgers

David Bowie singles chronology
"Fame '90" (1990)	"Real Cool World" (1992)	"Jump They Say" (1993)

"Real Cool World" is a song from the soundtrack of the American 1992 animated black comedy fantasy film Cool World. It is performed by British singer-songwriter David Bowie and produced by Nile Rodgers. The single was released on 10 August 1992 by Warner Bros., and represents his first new solo material since the dissolution of the band Tin Machine.

== Song development ==
The track marked a reunion with Let's Dance producer Nile Rodgers, with whom Bowie began working in the first half of 1992. "Real Cool World" was the first song to come out of their year-long collaboration. After releasing this song, Bowie intended to go back to his band Tin Machine to record a third album, but when the band fell apart, Bowie and Rodgers instead recorded and produced the songs for Bowie's next solo album, Black Tie White Noise (1993). The song was included in the soundtrack to the film Cool World (1992).

== Other releases ==
The song was included as a bonus track of the 2003 re-release of Black Tie White Noise, and a digital download version of the single was released in June 2010.

== Critical reception ==
A reviewer from Melody Maker wrote, "'Real Cool World' sees Bowie re-united with Nile Rodgers. The strings are pretty cool and the saxophone which suddenly pops up in the home straight is wonderfully sleazy. Sadly, the quick pace of the track is a bit too much for the Thin White Duke to handle. He sounds dreadfully tired, dreadfully old."

== Track listing ==
All tracks written by David Bowie.

- 12": Warner Bros. / W0127 (UK)
1. "Real Cool World" (Edit) – 4:15
2. "Real Cool World" (Instrumental) – 4:29
- 12": Warner Bros. / W0127T (UK)
1. "Real Cool World" (12" Club Mix) – 5:28
2. "Real Cool World" (Cool Dub Thing #2) – 6:54
3. "Real Cool World" (Cool Dub Thing #1) – 7:28
4. "Real Cool World" (Cool Dub Overture) – 9:10
- 12": Warner Bros. / W0127CD (UK)
1. "Real Cool World" (Album Edit) – 4:15
2. "Real Cool World" (Radio Remix) – 4:23
3. "Real Cool World" (Cool Dub Thing #1) – 7:28
4. "Real Cool World" (12" Club Mix) – 5:28
5. "Real Cool World" (Cool Dub Overture) – 9:10
6. "Real Cool World" (Cool Dub Thing #2) – 6:54
- Digital download: EMI
1. "Real Cool World" (Album Edit) – 4:16
2. "Real Cool World" (Radio Remix) – 4:24
3. "Real Cool World" (Cool Dub Thing 1) – 7:29
4. "Real Cool World" (12" Club Mix) – 5:30
5. "Real Cool World" (Cool Dub Overture) – 9:12
6. "Real Cool World" (Cool Dub Thing 2) – 6:56

== Personnel ==
- Producers:
  - Nile Rodgers
- Musicians:
  - David Bowie – vocals, saxophone
  - Nile Rodgers – guitar
  - Richard Hilton – keyboards
  - Barry Campbell – bass guitar
  - Sterling Campbell – drums

== Charts ==
Chart (1992)	Peak position
Australia (ARIA)	131
Belgium (Ultratop 50 Flanders)	30
Germany (GfK)	83
Netherlands (Dutch Top 40)	21
Netherlands (Single Top 100)	27
Sweden (Sverigetopplistan)	26
UK Singles (OCC)	53
UK Airplay (Music Week)	30
US Alternative Airplay (Billboard)	11
US Dance Club Songs (Billboard)	9
