= The Mobile Homes =

Swedish synth-pop band

- Origin: Sätra, Stockholm, Sweden
- Genres: Synth-pop, electropop
- Years active: 1984–present
- Labels: Papa Doc Records, Sonet Records, Hawk Records, BMG Sweden, Subspace Communications, Wild Kingdom
- Members: Andreas Brun; Patrik Brun; Hans Erkendahl; Sami Sirviö; Markus Mustonen
- Past members: Per Liliefeldt

The Mobile Homes are a Swedish synth-pop band formed in 1984 in Sätra, a suburb of Stockholm. The original lineup consisted of brothers Andreas and Patrik Brun, Hans Erkendahl and Per Liliefeldt. The band released its debut single, "Don't Give It Up", in 1986 and its first studio album, Hurt, in 1990. Over the course of their career, the group has collaborated with musicians and producers including Karl Bartos, Denniz Pop and Christian Falk, and has performed as a support act for Laibach and Nitzer Ebb.

== History ==
=== Formation and early recordings ===
The Mobile Homes were formed in 1984 in Sätra, a suburb of Stockholm. The original lineup comprised brothers Andreas and Patrik Brun, Hans Erkendahl and Per Liliefeldt. The band initially attracted attention as a demo act and signed with the Swedish record label Papa Doc Records. Their debut single, "Don't Give It Up", was released in 1986.

The band's name was taken from the song "Still Life in Mobile Homes" by the British band Japan. According to the members, their early musical influences included punk rock, Devo and The Residents, while Japan and Ultravox also influenced their developing electronic sound.

In their early years, The Mobile Homes performed as a support act for the Slovenian group Laibach and the British electronic band Nitzer Ebb. They subsequently worked with Swedish record labels including Sonet Records and Hawk Records.

=== Early albums ===
The band's debut studio album, Hurt, was released in 1990. According to an interview published by Messed!Up, the album brought the group considerable attention on Swedish television and radio. Their second album, Nothing But Something, followed in 1991.

The group released Test in 1992 and Meanwhile in 1994. During this period, they worked with producers including Denniz Pop, Christian Falk and Julian Beeston, known for his work with Nitzer Ebb.

In 1998, the band released the album The Mobile Homes, on which former Kraftwerk member Karl Bartos collaborated. The song "You Make the Sun Shine" received radio airplay and was used in an advertising campaign for Scandinavian Airlines (SAS).

In 1999, the group released the compilation album There Is No Place Like Away. Their next studio album, The World Will Listen, was released in 2001 and recorded at Polar Studios in Stockholm. Singles from the album included "Nostalgia" and "The More I Think the Deeper I Sink".

=== Hiatus and return ===
In 2003, The Mobile Homes signed with BMG Sweden and released an EP produced by Sami Sirviö, a member of the Swedish band Kent, and Stefan Boman.

The album Today Is Your Lucky Day, produced by Sirviö, was released in 2009. Sirviö subsequently became a permanent member of the band. The group then reduced its recording and live activity for several years.

In 2014, The Mobile Homes celebrated their 30th anniversary with concerts in Malmö and Stockholm. The performances featured guest musicians including former Kraftwerk member Wolfgang Flür, Kent members Martin Sköld and Markus Mustonen, and Robert Enforsen of Elegant Machinery.

=== Trigger and Tristesse ===
In March 2021, the band released Trigger, its first studio album in approximately twelve years. The lineup at the time consisted of Andreas Brun, Patrik Brun, Hans Erkendahl, Sami Sirviö and Markus Mustonen. The album featured guest vocals by filmmaker and musician Johan Renck on the song "The Sorrow Stays for Good".

In June 2023, the Swedish edition of GAFFA reported that the band was preparing a new album. The article identified the lineup as Patrik Brun, Andreas Brun, Hans Erkendahl, Sami Sirviö and Markus Mustonen. The album, Tristesse, was released on 22 September 2023 and featured Bon Harris of Nitzer Ebb.

== Musical style and influences ==
The Mobile Homes are associated with the Swedish synth-pop scene. Their music combines electronic arrangements and synthesizers with elements of pop and alternative rock. The band members have cited punk rock, Devo, The Residents, Japan, Ultravox, The Smiths, Simple Minds, The Cure and Depeche Mode among their influences.

In a 2016 interview with SYNTH.NU, the band described how its early sound gradually developed from a more conventional rock setup into a predominantly electronic approach. The members also explained that they continued to write songs using piano and guitar, even as synthesizers became central to their arrangements.

== Members ==
=== Current members ===
- Andreas Brun
- Patrik Brun
- Hans Erkendahl
- Sami Sirviö
- Markus Mustonen

The lineup was reported by Swedish publication GAFFA in September 2023.

=== Former members ===
- Per Liliefeldt

== Discography ==
=== Studio albums ===
- Hurt (1990)
- Nothing But Something (1991)
- Test (1992)
- Meanwhile (1994)
- The Mobile Homes (1998)
- The World Will Listen (2001)
- Today Is Your Lucky Day (2009)
- Trigger (2021)
- Tristesse (2023)

=== Compilation albums ===
- There Is No Place Like Away (1999)
