= Disappointed (Electronic song) =

1992 single by Electronic

Single by Electronic

from the album Songs from the Cool World
- B-side: "Idiot Country Two"; "Gangster" (FBI mix)
- Released: 22 June 1992
- Genre: Synth-pop
- Label: Parlophone
- Songwriters: Bernard Sumner; Johnny Marr; Neil Tennant
- Producers: Bernard Sumner; Johnny Marr; Neil Tennant

Electronic singles chronology
"Feel Every Beat" (1991)	"Disappointed" (1992)	"Forbidden City" (1996)

"Disappointed" is the fourth single released by English alternative dance group Electronic. Like their first single "Getting Away with It", it features Neil Tennant of the Pet Shop Boys as well as founding members Johnny Marr and Bernard Sumner. It was released on 22 June 1992 on Parlophone soon after the demise of Factory Records. The single was assigned the Factory catalogue number FAC 348, and the logo of the label remained on the artwork.

Upon the song's release, it reached the top 20 in Germany, Greece, Ireland, Portugal, Sweden, and the United Kingdom, and it peaked within the top 10 on three US Billboard charts. In July 1992, the song was featured in the soundtrack of the live-action/animation hybrid mystery movie Cool World; its inclusion both in the film and on its soundtrack album was advertised on the US single release.

== Composition ==
The song was based on a piano riff by Marr's brother Ian; and worked up into a full backing-track by Johnny Marr and Bernard Sumner. They decided to ask Neil Tennant to complete the song and he wrote the lyrics and vocal melody. Some of the words ("Disenchanted once more...") were partly inspired by Mylène Farmer's 1991 hit "Désenchantée". Tennant travelled to Manchester to record the lead vocal and a few weeks later went to Paris to attend the final mix of the song by Stephen Hague.

"Disappointed" was conceived just before the recording of New Order's sixth studio album Republic, and was performed live in December 1991 on Electronic's European tour: in Glasgow (sung by Bernard Sumner) and in London (sung by Tennant when Pet Shop Boys guested on three songs).

== Single ==
"Disappointed" was the last Electronic single to be released on all four major formats (7-inch, 12-inch, CD, and cassette). The content of the single was more dynamic than its predecessors, however; it had only one remix of the A-side (by 808 State; titled "808 Mix" in the US and "12-inch remix" in the UK), an additional treatment of a 1991 album track ("Idiot Country", with Ultimatum), and an earlier mix of "Disappointed" (called "Electronic Mix" in the US). The A-side of the single is itself a remix since producer Stephen Hague reworked the "Original Mix" for single release.

Although Electronic would enjoy three more top-twenty singles in the United Kingdom, "Disappointed" was the last major commercial success for the band on an international level, becoming a dance chart hit in the United States and reaching the top 20 in Germany as well as number six in the UK, their highest-charting effort there.

Until the release of Get the Message – The Best of Electronic in 2006, the track was not available on an Electronic album release. However, since "Disappointed" was featured in the 1992 film Cool World, the song was available on the soundtrack album Songs from the Cool World.

== Critical reception ==
Roger Morton of NME was negative in his review, calling the song "effortless in the worse sense" and one that "drifts off into a no man's land of half-hearted disco miserablism". He commented that Sumner and Marr "have programmed in the garagey synth lines and soft pedal Italian piano, and left out any semblance of melody", while Tennant "murmurs a few lugubrious lines with the enthusiasm of a narcoleptic jellyfish". Andrew Mueller of Melody Maker felt it "sounds as if minimum effort was exerted over its creation" and concluded, "This sounds like a Pet Shop Boys album track. This yaws where they have stretched."

== Track listings ==
- UK and German 7-inch single

A. "Disappointed" (7-inch mix) – 4:22
B. "Idiot Country Two" (edit) – 4:44

- UK 12-inch single

A1. "Disappointed" (12-inch remix)
B1. "Disappointed" (original mix)
B2. "Idiot Country Two"

- UK and European CD single
1. "Disappointed" (7-inch mix) – 4:22
2. "Disappointed" (12-inch remix) – 4:35
3. "Idiot Country Two" – 6:24
4. "Disappointed" (original mix) – 5:41
- US 12-inch maxi-single

A1. "Disappointed" (Electronic mix) – 5:39
A2. "Disappointed" (808 remix) – 4:32
B1. "Gangster" (FBI mix) – 7:59
B2. "Disappointed" (single mix) – 4:18

- US maxi-CD single digipak
1. "Disappointed" (single mix) – 4:22
2. "Disappointed" (Electronic mix) – 5:40
3. "Gangster" (FBI mix) – 8:00
4. "Disappointed" (808 remix) – 4:31

== Charts ==
=== Weekly charts ===
Chart (1992)	Peak position
Austria (Ö3 Austria Top 40)	23
Europe (Eurochart Hot 100)	14
Germany (GfK)	20
Greece (Virgin)	3
Ireland (IRMA)	17
Netherlands (Dutch Top 40 Tipparade)	15
Netherlands (Single Top 100)	77
Portugal (AFP)	8
Sweden (Sverigetopplistan)	14
UK Singles (Official Charts)	6
UK Airplay (Music Week)	3
US Dance Club Play (Billboard)	10
US Maxi-Singles Sales (Billboard)	6
US Modern Rock Tracks (Billboard)	9

=== Year-end charts ===
Chart (1992)	Position
Sweden (Topplistan)	94
