= Come Play with Me (2021 film) =

- Theatrical poster
- Spanish: Juega Conmigo
- Directed by: Adrián García Bogliano
- Written by: Adriana Pelusi
- Produced by: Billy Rovzar
- Starring: Liz Dieppa; Erik Israel Consuelo; Emilio Beltrán; Valery Sais
- Cinematography: Ernesto Herrera
- Edited by: Veronica Lopez Escalona
- Music by: Simon Boswell
- Distributed by: Video Cine
- Release date: March 11, 2021
- Running time: 70 minutes
- Country: Mexico
- Language: Spanish

Come Play with Me (Spanish: Juega Conmigo) is a 2021 Mexican supernatural horror film directed by Adrián García Bogliano. The film's plot follows Sofi, a young nanny who must confront an evil demon named Mormo in order to save the children she takes care of.

The film was originally released in Mexico on March 11, 2021, where it was a commercial success for its domestic box office. It was distributed by FilmSharks in the United States, and it is the first production of Lemonster, a division of Lemmon Studios.

== Plot ==
Sofía, better known as "Sofi", is an 18-year-old humble worker who, thanks to her elder sister Natalia, gets a job as a nanny for children of a wealthy family. On her first day, she is introduced to the family's children: Gabriel, the eldest and rebellious son, Ceci, the middle and shy daughter, and Bruno, the infant son. Even though Sofi gets used to her job easily, she struggles to earn the children's respect, especially from Gabriel, who often denigrates and humiliates her.

When Natalia learns of Gabriel's behavior, she tells him and his sister Ceci a cautionary tale from her childhood: "Mormo", a child-like demon who haunts spoiled kids whenever anyone invites him to his home out loud. Gabriel arrogantly refuses to believe her and challenges her by inviting Mormo, but gets no response. Sofi nags Natalia because she has childhood trauma from the same story thanks to her recently deceased grandmother, who used to scare her off with the same story in an explicit way as a result of a mental disorder. Soon, some strange things happen, like the sudden apparition of a nutcracker soldier toy and sightings of a mysterious hoodie figure who Ceci claims is Mormo himself.

At the weekend, Sofi has to stay with the kids because her bosses have a wedding invitation and Natalia asked for her day off. Sofi eventually gets attached to Ceci as she is afraid of the Mormo story, but Gabriel still taunts Sofi and invites Mormo again during dinner. After a mysterious blackout, Bruno disappears from the living room. Ceci warns that Mormo was the one who took him away, and now he will play with them until he gets bored.

Sofi asks one of the security guards, Maurico, to help her find Bruno, but when he is about to contact the rest of the security personnel, Mormo catches him as well. Sofi tells Gabriel and Ceci to flee the house, but Mormo stops them by playing "red lights, green lights" and is able to freeze the players if he touches them. With Ceci's help, she unfreezes Sofi, but warns they should play with Mormo as a way of pleasing him. After recalling part of the Mormo tale, Sofi tells the kids to play along with her hide and seek in order to draw Mormo's attention, who feels jealous of being ignored. Sofi then makes a deal with him: if they beat him in a hide and seek competition, he will leave them alone and return both Bruno and Mauricio safe. Sofi asks Ceci to stay near the finish line as she and Gabriel go looking for Mormo. However, Mormo cheats when he makes them see hallucinations of their relatives and manages to capture Gabriel and Ceci.

Devastated, Sofi hides in one of the bedrooms and mourns, but she gets motivated to confront Mormo again and firmly states she no longer fears him and is able to take away his nutcracker toy, which infuriates the demon. Sofi offers him to give it back in exchange for her life and the rest of his captive victims. Mormo agrees, but he makes her promise that if she fails, she will stay with him forever. Sofi agrees and goes to hide herself. She tricks Mormo by drawing him in one of the bedrooms using a baby monitor, which frees Gabriel, Ceci, Bruno and Mauricio.

Next day, Sofi is prevented from being fired by both Gabriel and Ceci now that they are fond of each other. As they take a walk in the neighborhood, they pass a spoiled kid who smashes his toys with a baseball bat until he notices Mormo's nutcracker implying he might turn in his next victim.

== Cast ==
- Liz Dieppa as Sofía "Sofi"
- Emilio Beltrán as Gabriel
- Valery Saiz as Cecilia "Ceci"
- Erik Israel Consuelo as Mario

Additionally, Octavio Hinojosa and Pablo Guisa Koestinger are part of the secondary cast.

== Production ==
The film is a co-production of Lemmon Studios with VideoCine; initially the film was scheduled for a 2020 fall release. However, due to the impact of COVID-19, the film was eventually delayed. It is intended to be the first film of Lemonster, a subsidiary of the main studio focused exclusively on horror films.

According to Billy Rovzer, Lemonster's founder, the subsidiary intends to launch the horror genre in Mexico by releasing at least 2 films per year. The film has flashbacks in its narrative for exploring the main character Sofi, and it also addresses topics like childhood traumatic experiences and parental negligence.

Main actress Liz Dieppa makes her cinematic debut in the role of Sofi. It was also Dieppa's first horror film role, and she took the part when she learned of Adrian Bogliano's directorial involvement. She is joined in the main cast by actors Valery Saiz and Emilio Beltrán, who play Ceci and Gabriel respectively.

Principal photography began in 2019 for a filming period of one month. Due to the movie's main plot being set in one location with a limited number of actors, both factors were beneficial for the movie's production.

== Reception ==
On March 5, 2021, it was reported the film would have a distribution in part of the United States by FilmSharks as part of a deal with original distributor Videocine with the name "Come Play with me". Due to the COVID-19 pandemic, the film was not screened for press reviewers.

Originally scheduled for a January 21, 2021 release date, the film grossed around 64 million pesos. For its third weekend, the film grossed a total of 4 million additional pesos. The film's box office stability was considered a success and made the film one of the best domestic films of the pandemic box office.
