= Second Nature (Electronic song) =

Single by Electronic

from the album Raise the Pressure
- B-side: "Turning Point"
- Released: 3 February 1997
- Genre: Alternative rock
- Label: Parlophone (United Kingdom); Virgin (Europe); Warner Bros. (United States)
- Songwriter(s): Bernard Sumner, Johnny Marr
- Producer(s): Bernard Sumner, Johnny Marr

Electronic singles chronology
"For You" (1996)	"Second Nature" (1997)	"Until the End of Time" (1997)

"Second Nature" is a song by Electronic, released as the group's seventh single. It has an autobiographical lyric by Sumner which concerns his youth and growing up, while the music has a groovy shuffle which contrasts with the stricter dance tracks on its parent album Raise the Pressure. "Second Nature" reached #35 on the UK Singles Chart.

== Releases ==
"Second Nature" was first released in the United States as a CD maxi single of DJ remixes in October 1996, then issued commercially by Parlophone in the UK and by Virgin Records in Germany the following February on two CDs and cassette. Each format had a different photograph on its cover.

Unlike every other commercial Electronic single, no music video was made for "Second Nature", although it was promoted by live performances on TFI Friday and Later... with Jools Holland. Its primary B-side "Turning Point" is an instrumental dance track that includes drum loops and sampled vocals. The other track on the first CD was the 12" remix of third single "Feel Every Beat", which had not been released in Britain on Compact Disc before.

The second CD featured three remixes, by Markus Schulz and C. I. McSpadden ("Plastik Mix" and "Trance Atlantic Dub") and Richie Santana ("Sweet Remix").

Apart from the "Trance Atlantic Dub" and an edited version of the "Plastik Vox" mix, none of the remixes on the American maxi single have been made commercially available, and the item is extremely rare.

Designed at Fluid by Lee Basford and James Glover, Midge Wrighton from Albrighton, England was the original photographer for Electronic - "Second Nature" (1996). He died on 27 December 1999.

== Track listings ==
=== UK CD1/EU CD ===
1. "Second Nature"
2. "Turning Point"
3. "Feel Every Beat" (12" remix)

=== UK CD2 ===
1. "Second Nature"
2. "Second Nature" (Plastik Mix)
3. "Second Nature" (Trance Atlantic Dub)
4. "Second Nature" (Sweet Remix)

=== UK MC ===
1. "Second Nature"
2. "Turning Point"

=== UK/US promo CD ===
1. "Second Nature" (edit)
- The edits on each CD were different.

=== US maxi single ===
1. Journey Mix Radio Edit
2. Extended Journey Mix
3. Modern Mix Radio Edit
4. Extended Modern Mix
5. Plastik Vox
6. Trance Atlantic Dub
7. Edge Factor Dub
8. Alternative Dub
