= Make It Happen (Electronic song) =

Single by Electronic

from the album Twisted Tenderness
- B-side: "Prodigal Son"
- Released: June 1999
- Genre: Big beat
- Label: Parlophone (United Kingdom)
- Songwriter(s): Bernard Sumner, Johnny Marr
- Producer(s): Bernard Sumner, Johnny Marr, Arthur Baker

Electronic singles chronology
"Vivid" (1999)	"Make It Happen" (1999)	"Late at Night" (1999)

"Make It Happen" is a dance/rock song written and performed by the Bernard Sumner/Johnny Marr band Electronic. Produced by Electronic with Arthur Baker, it is the first track on their third album Twisted Tenderness.

Sumner and Marr both contribute vocals and guitar, while Jimi Goodwin from Doves provides bass and Jed Lynch plays drums and percussion. Merv de Peyer is credited with programming and keyboards plus audio mixing. Arthur Baker with scratching.

Intended as the first single from the album (an honour which went to "Vivid"), "Make It Happen" was eventually issued as a promotional 10" single on clear vinyl, like the previous promo "Prodigal Son". This featured an Ice-T sample that was cut from the album version due to a clearance problem. Around eleven seconds longer, it had been released on promo versions of the album but the legal issues had prevented its inclusion on the commercial edition. The version with the sample did appear on Electronic's last single "Late at Night", however.

Copies of the album with the Ice T sample were reviewed in the music press. Pat Gilbert in Mojo magazine wrote: "The opener, 'Make It Happen', lurches in with a grinding, fucked-up, hip hop beat, and the portentous promise that, 'This is not a pop album'". Andrew Collins described its production as "so old-fashioned it’s instantly refreshing".

== Track listing ==
1. "Make It Happen (Original Mix)" (7:48)
2. "Make It Happen (Darren Price Mix)" (5:58)
3. "Prodigal Son (Cevin Fisher Mix)" (8:20)
