= Twisted Tenderness =

Studio album by Electronic
- Released: 12 April 1999
- Recorded: Summer 1998
- Genre: Alternative rock, alternative dance, electronic
- Length: 61:52
- Label: Parlophone (Japan, UK); Koch Records (United States)
- Producer: Bernard Sumner, Johnny Marr, Arthur Baker

Electronic chronology
Raise the Pressure (1996)	Twisted Tenderness (1999)

Twisted Tenderness::Deluxe
- 2001 two-disc edition.

Professional ratings
Review scores
Source	Rating
Allmusic	4/5 stars

Twisted Tenderness is the third and final studio album by British supergroup Electronic, released in April 1999 by Parlophone in the UK and eighteen months later by Koch Records in the USA in 2000. It was re-released in 2001 as Twisted Tenderness::Deluxe by Koch with a second disc of B-sides and remixes added.

== History ==
The writing and recording of the album was a reaction to the protracted sessions of its predecessor Raise the Pressure, which had taken a year and a half to complete. Johnny Marr and Bernard Sumner remained the only official members of the band, but were joined by Doves frontman Jimi Goodwin on bass and Black Grape drummer Ged Lynch. The sound of the album reflected this back-to-basics approach in terms of the line-up, although subsequent production and mixing incorporated additional beats and samples.

Twisted Tenderness was co-produced by influential New York City club DJ and dance producer Arthur Baker, with whom Sumner had previously worked on New Order's 1983 hit "Confusion", amongst other songs.

The promo issue of the album contained an uncleared sample of Ice-T proclaiming "this is not a pop album" on the track "Make It Happen". This mix had a duration of 7:50; it was shortened for release when the sample was removed.

Early promos also included "King for a Day", which was eventually released as a B-side to "Late at Night". Reviews in Q and Mojo were based on this configuration; the former stated that there were twelve tracks while the latter mentioned the reference to Dracula in the song lyrics. "King for a Day" was included on the album's Japan release (which predated Britain release by a week) as well as USA release in 2000.

Intro of song "Like No Other" was sampled from song "Run Through the Jungle" of Creedence Clearwater Revival.

The singles "Vivid" and "Late at Night" featured three B-sides between them, namely "Radiation" (an instrumental co-written with Baker), "King for a Day" and "Warning Sign", all of which appeared on the Deluxe edition next to promo versions and previously released remixes.

Russian mystic Grigori Rasputin is featured on the cover.

== Track listing ==
All songs written by Marr/Sumner, except where noted.

1. "Make It Happen" – 7:38
2. "Haze" – 5:11
3. "Vivid" – 5:36
4. "Breakdown" – 5:50
5. "Can't Find My Way Home" (Steve Winwood) – 4:52
6. "Twisted Tenderness" – 5:31
7. "Like No Other" – 4:38
8. "Late at Night" – 4:12
9. "Prodigal Son" – 7:10
10. "When She's Gone" – 4:29
11. "Flicker" – 6:25
- The 2000 American edition included three bonus tracks: "King for a Day", "Warning Sign" and "Make It Happen" (Album Remix).

=== 2001 Deluxe edition bonus disc ===
1. "King for a Day" – 4:28
2. "Warning Sign" – 4:45
3. "Make It Happen" (Remix) – 5:58
4. "Haze" (Alternative Mix) – 5:23
5. "Prodigal Son" (Star in Your Own Mind Mix) – 10:05
6. "Radiation" (Arthur Baker, Johnny Marr, Bernard Sumner) – 7:31
7. "Prodigal Son" (Touched by the Hand of Inch) – 5:07
8. "Prodigal Son" (Two Lone Swordsmen remix) – 5:35
9. "Prodigal Son" (Harvey's Greatly Deluded Mix) – 3:16
10. "Come Down" (Cevin Fisher Mix) – 8:19

== Singles ==
1. "Vivid" (12 April 1999)
2. "Late at Night" (5 July 1999) (withdrawn in the UK)

== Promos ==
1. "Prodigal Son" (March 1999)
2. "Make It Happen" (June 1999)

== Personnel ==
- Bernard Sumner - Vocals and guitars, bass on track 4
- Johnny Marr - Guitars, bass, harmonica, backing vocals
- Jimi Goodwin - Bass and backing vocals
- Ged Lynch - Drums and percussion
- Phil Spalding - Bass
- Lindsay Reed - Backing Vocals
- Astrid Williamson - Backing vocals
- Arthur Baker - Scratches, harmonica and keyboards
- Merv de Peyer - Keyboards and programming
- Mac Quayle - Keyboards and programming
- Jason Mad Doctor X - Scratches
- Fridge - Beats and effects
- Produced by - Electronic and Arthur Baker
- Engineer - James Spencer
- Engineer - Darren Allison (tracks 2 & 8)
- Mixed by - James Spencer (tracks 4,5,6,7,9,11)
- Mixed by - Merv de Peyer (tracks 1,2,3,8,10)

== Charts ==
Weekly chart performance for Twisted Tenderness
Chart (2025)	Peak position
Hungarian Physical Albums (MAHASZ)	20
