= Trevor Johnson (designer) =

British graphic designer

Trevor Johnson (born in Salford, Lancashire) is a British graphic designer based in Manchester. He started his career at the age of 16 as a commercial illustrator and went on to become a freelance graphic designer.

He designed record sleeves and branding for Factory Records and Hacienda Nightclub Fac 51, which was instrumental in the creation of the Madchester music scene of the late 1980s and early 1990s. His designs for Factory Records, created solo and with his business partner Tony Panas of Johnson/Panas, are documented in the Factory Records Catalogue of sleeves and merchandise and company promotional material.

In the 1970s Johnson was inducted into the S.L.A.D.E. Union. He has worked with high-profile clients like Manchester United FC, Manchester International Airport, Granada Television, Tate Liverpool, and Royal Exchange Theatre. He has directed a number of art shows, showcasing visual art of varying mediums, including his own Object57.

== Publications ==
- Factory Records: The Complete Graphic Album. FAC 461 - Matthew Robertson - Thames & Hudson (2006) - ISBN 978-0-500-51300-2
- Fly: The Art of The Club Flyer - Nicola Ackland-Snow, Nathan Brett, Steven Williams - Thames & Hudson (1996) (Reprinted 2001) - ISBN 0-500-27909-8
- The Sol Mix: Manchester Music and Design, 1976-92 - Andy Spinoza, B. Bytheway, D. Crow - Cornerhouse Publications (1992) - ISBN 1-897586-00-0
- The Haçienda Must be Built! - John Savage - International Music Publications (1992) - ISBN 0-86359-857-9
