= Cities in the Park =

1991 music event in Manchester, England

Cities in the Park was a two-day music event held on the 3rd and 4 August 1991 at Heaton Park in Manchester, England. It was held in honour of Factory Records producer Martin Hannett, who had died in April. Some profits from ticket sales went to African Famine Relief and the Kurdish Trust Fund.

The first day included performances by The Wonder Stuff and Orchestral Manoeuvres in the Dark, and the second featured many Factory acts such as Happy Mondays, Electronic and A Certain Ratio. Frank Sidebottom also made an appearance. A home video of highlights, which was filmed on super 8 film, was released by Palace in November 1991. It can be viewed online on the BFI player The bands credited on the tickets were as follows:

== Saturday 3rd ==
- The Wonder Stuff
- Beautiful South (pulled out - did not play)
- The Soup Dragons (pulled out - did not play)
- Orchestral Manoeuvres in the Dark
- Cabaret Voltaire
- The Buzzcocks
- The Railway Children
- Ruthless Rap Assassins
- Paris Angels
- Ashley & Jackson
- Amok
- The Fall
- New Fast Automatic Daffodils (played Saturday 3rd not Sunday)

== Sunday 4th ==
- Happy Mondays
- Electronic
- De La Soul
- A Certain Ratio
- Revenge
- New Fast Automatic Daffodils
- The Durutti Column
- The Wendys
- 808 State
- The Adventure Babies
- Cath Carroll
- Natural Life

== Video ==
- A Certain Ratio — "Wonder Y"
- New Fast Automatic Daffodils — "Fishes Eyes"
- Durutti Column — "Fado"
- Ashley & Jackson — "Come Alive"
- Ruthless Rap Assassins — "Why Me"
- Cabaret Voltaire — "Don't Walk Away"
- Natural Life — "Strange World"
- Buzzcocks — "Ever Fallen in Love (With Someone You Shouldn't've)"
- Adventure Babies — "My Only Way"
- Revenge — "Bleachman"
- The Wendys — "Suckling"
- Electronic — "Feel Every Beat"
- Happy Mondays — "Kinky Afro"; "God's Cop"; "Denis & Lois"; "Wrote for Luck"
