= Feel Every Beat =

Single by Electronic

from the album Electronic
- B-side: "Lean to the Inside", "Second to None"
- Released: 9 September 1991
- Recorded: 1991
- Genre: Madchester
- Label: Factory (UK) FAC 328; Virgin (Europe); Warner Bros. (Australia, U.S.)
- Songwriters: Bernard Sumner, Johnny Marr
- Producers: Bernard Sumner, Johnny Marr

Electronic singles chronology
"Tighten Up" (1991)	"Feel Every Beat" (1991)	"Disappointed" (1992)

"Feel Every Beat" was the third single by the English band Electronic. It was released in the UK on 9 September 1991 (see 1991 in music) by Factory Records and was a modest commercial success.

== Composition ==
The A-side is a combination of rock and house music, and is a favourite of both the two members Johnny Marr and Bernard Sumner. Marr began an early version of "Feel Every Beat" with the intention of releasing it on a solo album. Sumner's lyrics are about the criminalisation of rave culture in Britain.

The two B-sides, "Lean to the Inside" (an instrumental that used sampled drums from the ABC song "Fear of the World") and "Second to None," are included on the 2013 Special Edition bonus disc of the Electronic album re-release. Both tracks are listed as "2013 edit". The disc also features a "2013 edit" of Feel Every Beat.

== Artwork ==
The single was packaged by 3a, and featured a contemporary design with stars and a minimalist colour scheme, which differed subtly from format to format. The shapes are based on the DX coding of 35mm film canisters. In Australia the front and back covers were switched, with Donald Christie's portrait of Marr and Sumner used more prominently with the star-motif above it.

== Formats ==
The single was released on vinyl, CD and cassette in Britain, and as 12" and CD maxi singles in the United States. These two formats included exclusive remixes by Dave Shaw which were not issued anywhere else; the "Downstairs Dub" mix has never been released on CD.

== Music video ==
A music video for the song was directed by Peter Scammell. This was later edited when the single was released. There is also a remixed version by the music video subscription service Rockamerica.

== Live ==
"Feel Every Beat" was first played live at The Haçienda in January 1991. Parts of Danny Rampling's 12" remix were used for live versions that August and December. A performance from the Cities in the Park festival in Manchester was released on video in November 1991.

== Charts ==
Chart (1991)	Peak position
Australia (ARIA)	156
Luxembourg (Radio Luxembourg)	17
UK Singles (OCC)	39
UK Airplay (Music Week)	19
US Alternative Airplay (Billboard)	27
US Hot Dance Club Play (Billboard)	28

== Track listings ==
=== UK 7" and MC ===
1. "Feel Every Beat" (7" remix) – 3:55
2. "Lean to the Inside" – 4:06
- Track 1 was remixed by Stephen Hague.

=== UK 12" ===
1. "Feel Every Beat" (12" remix) – 6:49
2. "Feel Every Beat" (Dub Mix) – 6:02
3. "Lean to the Inside" – 4:05
- Tracks 1 and 2 were remixed by

Danny Rampling and Pete Lorimer.

=== UK/EU/AU CD ===
1. "Feel Every Beat" (7" remix) – 3:57
2. "Feel Every Beat" (DNA Mix) – 5:40
3. "Second to None" – 4:01
4. "Lean to the Inside" – 4:05

=== US promo CD ===
1. Single remix
2. Album edit

=== US 12" maxi single ===
1. "Feel Every Beat" (Tactile Mix) – 5:54
2. "Feel Every Beat" (U.K. 12" remix) – 6:49
3. "Feel Every Beat" (Downstairs Dub) – 3:28
4. "Feel Every Beat" (Downstairs Mix) – 6:08
5. "Lean to the Inside" (instrumental) – 4:05
6. "Feel Every Beat" (DNA 12" Remix) – 5:39
- Track 6 was remixed by DNA.

=== US CD maxi single ===
1. "Feel Every Beat" (single remix) – 3:56
2. "Feel Every Beat" (Tactile Mix) – 5:54
3. "Feel Every Beat" (Downstairs Mix) – 6:08
4. "Lean to the Inside" (instrumental) – 4:05
5. "Feel Every Beat" (U.K. 12" remix) – 6:49
6. "Feel Every Beat" (DNA Remix) – 5:39
7. "Second to None" – 4:01
