= Karl Bartos =

German musician and composer

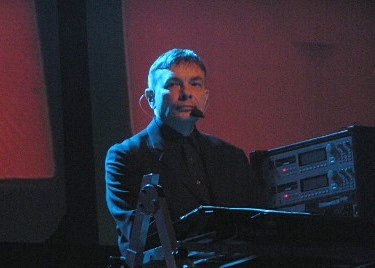
- Bartos in 2005

Background information
- Born: Karlheinz Bartos; 31 May 1952 (age 74); Marktschellenberg, West Germany
- Genres: Electronic; synth-pop; krautrock; jazz; trip hop
- Occupations: Musician; professor
- Instruments: Percussion; synthesizers; vocals
- Years active: 1965–present
- Labels: AudioVision; Bureau-B; SPV; Columbia/SME Records; Atlantic Records
- Website: KarlBartos.com

Karlheinz Bartos (born 31 May 1952) is a German musician and composer, known for his contributions to the electronic band Kraftwerk.

== Career ==
Karlheinz Bartos was born on 31 May 1952 in Marktschellenberg, Germany, named after his grandfathers Karl and Heinz. He was the drummer in a college band called The Jokers (later The Jolly Jokers in 1975) as Carlos Bartos, around 1965 to 1975. Between 1975 and 1990, he played electronic percussion, along with Wolfgang Flür, in the electronic music band Kraftwerk. This lineup of the group remains the most stable and productive yet assembled. He was originally recruited to play on Kraftwerk's US tour in support of their album Autobahn, where he changed his name to "Karl", as the band member's names were displayed on stage in neon lighting, "Karlheinz" being deemed too long and thus too expensive by Kraftwerk's front man Ralf Hütter. As a percussionist, Bartos was influenced by Ringo Starr of the Beatles, as well as the composers Carlos Chávez, Edgard Varèse, Igor Stravinsky, Béla Bartók, and Johann Sebastian Bach. In addition to his percussion, and also keyboard, playing, he was credited with songwriting on the albums Die Mensch-Maschine, Computerwelt and Electric Café, and sang one lead vocal on the latter. He contributed with some of the band's most popular riffs, such as Das Model, Computerliebe, Computerwelt, among others. Karl Bartos invented the influential Numbers beat, which was used in Afrika Bambaataa's seminal hit Planet Rock (1982) for hip-hop and rap music, among others.

Bartos left Kraftwerk in August 1990, reportedly frustrated at the band's slow progress in their activities due to the increasingly perfectionist attitude of Hütter and Florian Schneider. Bartos hinted at this fact in an interview entitled "I was a Robot", which is a part of the documentary film "Kraftwerk and the Electronic Revolution".

In 1992 Bartos founded Elektric Music. This new project released the Kraftwerk-style Esperanto in 1993, and then the more guitar-based Electric Music in 1998. In between the two albums, Bartos collaborated with Bernard Sumner and Johnny Marr on Electronic's 1996 album Raise the Pressure, and co-wrote material with Andy McCluskey of OMD, which appeared on both Esperanto and OMD's Universal. In 1998, he also produced an album by Swedish synth-pop band the Mobile Homes, much in the style of his work with Electronic: guitar-pop with very slight synthetic references. It was received as a great disappointment to synth-pop fans, but it sold more than any of their previous albums and was used in an advert for an airline.

In 1992 Elektric Music were asked to remix Afrika Bambaataa's song "Planet Rock" for release on a remix album. Planet Rock was the subject of an out-of-court settlement between Kraftwerk and Tommy Boy Records head Tom Silverman, as it uses significant parts from both Kraftwerk's "Trans-Europe Express" and "Numbers".

In 2003, using his own name, he released the synth-pop album Communication, featuring such songs as "I'm the Message," "Camera," and "Ultraviolet."

In 2007, his music provided the soundtrack to the documentary Moebius Redux – A Life in Pictures, about the graphic artist Jean Giraud.

Karl Bartos announced in early 2008 that he had opened the first edition of the audio-visual exhibition Crosstalk for public viewing at the white cube section on the official Karl Bartos website. The program holds 21 films, remixes, cover versions, and mash-ups from Sweden, Belgium, the Netherlands, Germany, United Kingdom, the USA, and Japan.

In March 2011, Karl Bartos released Mini-Composer, an iPhone app. It's a simple 16 steps sequencer with 4 basic waves synthesizer. It has been designed with Japanese artist Masayuki Akamatsu and the executive producer is Jean-Marc Lederman.

On 15 March 2013 he released his next studio album, Off the Record, preceded by "Atomium" the first single taken from it.The 7" version, released worldwide on 1 February 2013, was limited to 1,000 copies.

In September 2020, the official Karl Bartos email newsletter announced that Karl was working on a new project and intended to present this work live once the COVID-19 pandemic had slowed down.

On 12 May 2021, Kraftwerk was announced as one of the inductees of the Rock and Roll Hall of Fame with Bartos being one of the inductees along with Schneider, Hütter and Flür.

For a tour starting on 17 February 2024 in Frankfurt/Main, he and sound designer Mathias Black created a new electro-acoustic soundtrack for Das Cabinet des Dr. Caligari to be performed live, based on the version restored by the F. W. Murnau Foundation.

== Discography ==
With Kraftwerk

- 1975: Radio-Activity
- 1977: Trans-Europe Express
- 1978: The Man-Machine
- 1981: Computer World
- 1983: "Tour de France" (single)
- 1986: Electric Café
- 1991: The Mix (sound-data programming, uncredited)

With Elektric Music (now Electric Music)

- 1992: Afrika Bambaataa and the Soulsonic Force – "Planet Rock (Classic Mix)"
- 1993: Esperanto
- 1998: Electric Music

With Electronic

- 1996: Raise the Pressure

As Karl Bartos

- 2003: Communication (GER #85; SWE #30)
- 2013: Off the Record (GER #44; SWE #47; BE (Vl) #161)
- 2024: The Cabinet of Dr. Caligari

Singles:

- 2000: "15 Minutes of Fame"
- 2003: "I'm the Message"
- 2004: "Camera Obscura"
- 2013: "Atomium"
- 2016: "Life"
- 2016: "I'm the Message (Matthew Herbert's Doctor Rockit Mix)"
- 2016: "15 Minutes of Fame"

Unreleased

- 1994: 2nd proposed Elektric Music album (Most of the songs were performed at Elektric Music's Virtual Summer Tour in 1994).
- 2007: Moebius Redux – Ein Leben in Bildern / Une vie en images / A Life in Pictures (original soundtrack)

== Bibliography ==
- 2012: "Kraftwerk: Publikation" – preface (Omnibus Press)
- 2017: "Der Klang der Maschine: Autobiografie" (Eichborn publishing)
- 2022: "The Sound of the Machine: My Life in Kraftwerk and Beyond" (Omnibus Press)
