= Raise the Pressure =

Studio album by Electronic
- Released: 8 July 1996
- Recorded: 1994–1996
- Genres: Alternative rock; alternative dance; house
- Length: 62:25
- Labels: Parlophone; Virgin; Warner Bros.
- Producers: Bernard Sumner; Johnny Marr

Electronic chronology
Electronic (1991)	Raise the Pressure (1996)	Twisted Tenderness (1999)

Singles from Raise the Pressure
- 1. "Forbidden City" Released: 24 June 1996; 2. "For You" Released: 16 September 1996; 3. "Second Nature" Released: 3 February 1997

Raise the Pressure is Electronic's second studio album, released in July 1996.

== Recording ==
Seven of the thirteen tracks were composed by full-time members Johnny Marr and Bernard Sumner, and the other six co-written with former Kraftwerk member Karl Bartos. He was recommended to Electronic via a friend of Sumner's, and commuted to Manchester throughout 1995 during the recording sessions, which stretched from late 1994 to late 1995.

The protracted sessions resulted in a dense, thick production that was later acknowledged by both Sumner and Marr and criticised in professional reviews; they consequently spent much less time on their next album Twisted Tenderness.

Raise the Pressure was also remarked upon for Bernard Sumner's impressionistic lyrics, which some saw as the result of his use of Prozac during this period, following an appearance on the BBC 2 programme The Late Show, which explored the effects of the antidepressant on creativity. According to Sumner, however, he only wrote one lyric whilst under the influence of Prozac. Musically the album comprises guitar pop/rock songs ("One Day", "Out of My League") and more dance oriented tracks ("Until the End of Time", "If You've Got Love").

In a May 1995 interview with Melody Maker, Bernard spoke about the recording process and his experience with Prozac. Bernard revealed the 14 songs written by him and Johnny at this point, a few of which retained their titles: Forbidden City, For You, Visit Me, Second Nature, and Time Can Tell, remained as is, whilst the other tracks mentioned were "Intaferon", "As the World Turns", "Cold Anger", "Breathless", "Positive", "Too Much Trouble" and "Raise the Pressure".

The title 'Raise the Pressure' was taken from Jon Savage's 1991 book "England's Dreaming" on the Sex Pistols and Punk scene, according to Johnny Marr.

== Artwork ==
The album cover is a painting of a cherub by Johannes Handschin, which echoes the sleeve of New Order's 1989 album Technique. The title of the album appears on the inner inlay sleeve of most CD releases; the Australian CD and cassette editions are two which have Raise the Pressure placed on the cover. This was the last Electronic album to be released on vinyl.

== Reception ==
Professional ratings
Review scores
Source	Rating
AllMusic	3/5 stars
Smash Hits	5/5 stars

Unlike its predecessor Electronic, Raise the Pressure received mixed reviews and did not perform as well commercially, with the first two singles "Forbidden City" and "For You" charting modestly in the UK Top 20, and the third, "Second Nature", barely making the Top 40. In the US no commercial singles were released, with "Forbidden City" and "Second Nature" issued only as promotional radio-play discs. Four mixes of "Until the End of Time" were released through the Electronic mailing list in October 1997; this item and a maxi single of "Second Nature" remixes are among the most sought-after recordings by the band.

In 2007 a download-only edition of Raise the Pressure was released on the iTunes Store, adding all five B-sides from the single releases. The remixes of "Until the End of Time" were also released on iTunes at this time.

== Track listings ==
All tracks are written by Bernard Sumner and Johnny Marr, except where noted.

No.	Title	Writer(s)	Length
1.	"Forbidden City"	Bernard Sumner; Johnny Marr; Karl Bartos	4:03
2.	"For You"	Sumner; Marr; Bartos	4:52
3.	"Dark Angel"		5:30
4.	"One Day"		4:35
5.	"Until the End of Time"	Sumner; Marr; Bartos	6:19
6.	"Second Nature"		4:55
7.	"If You've Got Love"	Sumner; Marr; Bartos	6:26
8.	"Out of My League"		4:36
9.	"Interlude"		0:44
10.	"Freefall"		4:58
11.	"Visit Me"		5:58
12.	"How Long"	Sumner; Marr; Bartos	4:46
13.	"Time Can Tell"	Sumner; Marr; Bartos	4:43
Total length:			62:25

Japanese edition bonus track
No.	Title	Writer(s)	Length
14.	"All That I Need"	Sumner; Marr; Bartos	7:09
Total length:			71:34

iTunes edition bonus tracks
No.	Title	Writer(s)	Length
14.	"Imitation of Life"	Sumner; Marr; Bartos	3:47
15.	"A New Religion"	Sumner; Marr; Bartos	4:15
16.	"All That I Need"		7:09
17.	"I Feel Alright"	Sumner; Marr; Bartos	4:48
18.	"Turning Point"		5:35
Total length:			87:34

== Personnel ==
- Bernard Sumner – vocals, keyboards, production
- Johnny Marr – guitars, bass, keyboards, production
- Karl Bartos – keyboards
- Denise Johnson – additional vocals
- Ged Lynch – drums, percussion
- Donald Johnson – drums on "One Day"
- Danny Saber – organ on "Out of My League"
- Guy Pratt – bass on "Time Can Tell"
- Alan Meyerson – mixing (1, 4, 5, 6, 7, 9, 12, 13)
- James Spencer – mixing (2, 3, 8, 10, 11), engineering
- Johannes Handschin – artwork
- Paul Barnes – band logo
- Howard Wakefield and Peter Saville – design

== Charts ==
Chart	Peak position
Australian Albums Chart	94
Canada Top Albums/CDs (RPM)	31
Hungarian Physical Albums (MAHASZ)	37
UK Albums Chart	8
Billboard 200	143
US Top Heatseekers	7
