= Electronic (band) =

English alternative dance group (1988–2000)

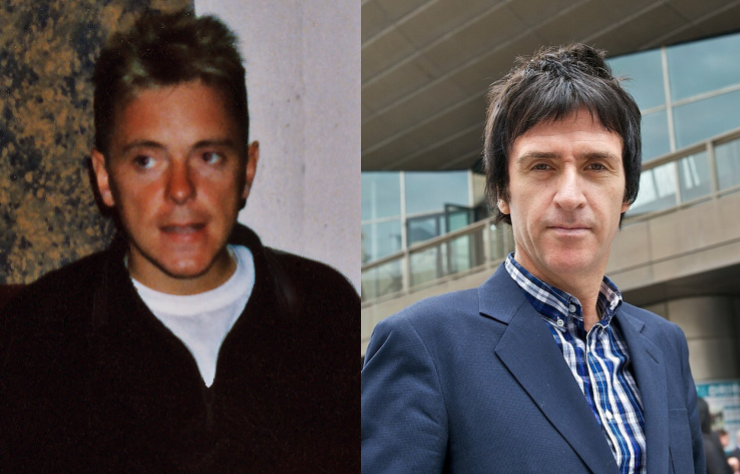
- Bernard Sumner (left) and Johnny Marr (right) of Electronic

Background information
- Origin: Manchester and Salford, England
- Genres: Alternative dance; dance-rock; alternative rock; synthpop
- Years active: 1988–2000
- Labels: EMI; Factory; Parlophone; Warner Bros.
- Spinoff of: New Order; The Smiths; Pet Shop Boys; Kraftwerk; Art of Noise; ABC
- Past members: Bernard Sumner; Johnny Marr

Electronic were an English alternative dance supergroup formed by singer/guitarist Bernard Sumner (of New Order) and guitarist Johnny Marr (of the Smiths). They co-wrote the majority of their output between 1989 and 1998, (Note: Twisted Tenderness was finished by late 1998; the earliest promotional copies were released the following February.) collaborating with the synth-pop duo Pet Shop Boys on three tracks in their early years, and former Kraftwerk member Karl Bartos on nine songs in 1995.

== History ==
The two first met in 1984 when the Smiths guitarist contributed to a Quando Quango track that Sumner was producing. Later in 1988, Sumner was frustrated because his New Order bandmates were not receptive to his desire to add synth programming to their music. He decided to produce a solo album but found that he did not enjoy working alone, so he called Marr for help.

Inspired by contemporary dance music like Italo house and acts such as Technotronic, their initial concept was to release white label records on Factory and remain an anonymous entity, in contrast to their considerable reputations with The Smiths and New Order. The track "Lucky Bag" and the name Electronic itself are two of the vestiges of this initial approach.

The fruits of this union became "Getting Away with It", Electronic's debut single which was released in December 1989 and sold around 350,000 copies. The drums on this record were played by ABC's David Palmer and the string arrangement was written by Anne Dudley. It was a Top 40 hit in America the following spring and they toured in support for Depeche Mode in August 1990. After this success, Sumner and Marr took a more commercial direction, blending synthesizers, guitars and analogue technology while retaining the template of contemporary alternative rock.

== Albums ==
=== Electronic ===
After a year of intensive recording (and 18 months after "Getting Away with It"), the debut album Electronic was released to critical acclaim and domestic commercial success, featuring the Top 10 single "Get the Message" and another Top 40 single, "Feel Every Beat". The album sold over a million copies worldwide.

Along with its fusion of rock and pop, Electronic continued their interest in dance music by inviting DJs to remix their singles and album tracks; this was a trend that continued throughout their career. Prominent acts that worked on Electronic songs around this period include Danny Rampling, DNA, Dave Shaw and Quando Quango founder and Haçienda DJ Mike Pickering.

After the first album was released and promoted, Marr and Sumner recorded albums with The The and New Order respectively, regrouping with Neil Tennant in 1992 to record their fourth and highest-charting single "Disappointed".

=== Raise the Pressure ===
Electronic was resumed when these activities ended, and work began on the second album in late 1994. The core duo was joined by Karl Bartos, ex-percussionist and songwriter with Kraftwerk.

Raise the Pressure was released in July 1996 on the Parlophone label in the UK and Warner Bros. Like its predecessor it fused dance music with a guitar-led approach, but some reviewers felt its production was too rich and distracted from the songs. The album spawned two guitar oriented singles, "Forbidden City" [UK number 14] and "For You" [UK number 16], with the dancier "Second Nature" issued in February 1997 and reaching UK number 35.

=== Twisted Tenderness ===
Electronic did not promote Raise the Pressure with a tour, although they performed its singles live on television shows including Top of the Pops and TFI Friday. Instead, they chose to swiftly record their third album. This was to be a reaction to the length of time they spent producing Raise the Pressure, with an emphasis on writing and demoing songs quickly before recording them. Marr and Sumner were joined by Doves bassist Jimi Goodwin and Black Grape drummer Ged Lynch, and together they made the album Twisted Tenderness as a more conventional four-piece group. The album did not return the group to their early 1990s levels of popularity but was well received by critics.

=== Current status ===
Neither Sumner nor Marr has gone on record with any formal dissolution of the band despite both having moved on to other projects. However, in 2003, Marr did agree that the band had reached "its natural conclusion" and that he was happy that it ended on a positive note. Sumner returned with New Order shortly after the final album was released, and in 2009, formed a new band, Bad Lieutenant. Marr has since worked with many acts, including The Healers, Pet Shop Boys, The Cribs and Modest Mouse, as well as releasing several solo albums.

Marr and Sumner played with Doves for the Manchester v Cancer charity concert in January 2006 and the compilation album Get the Message – The Best of was released that September to mild promotion and sales [UK number 194]. In July 2013 Sumner joined Marr at Jodrell Bank to perform "Getting Away With It". Marr was supporting for New Order and performing songs from his career.

== Members ==
- Bernard Sumner – vocals, guitar, keyboards (1988–2001)
- Johnny Marr – guitars, bass, vocals, keyboards (1988–2001)

Collaborators

- Neil Tennant – vocals, keyboards, guitar (1989–1994)
- Chris Lowe – keyboards (1989–1994)
- Karl Bartos – percussion, synthesizers, vocals (1994–1995)
- Jimi Goodwin – bass, vocals, keyboards (1996–1999) [TV Performances and Twisted Tenderness]
- Ged Lynch – drums, percussion (1996–1999) [TV Performances and Twisted Tenderness]
- Phil Cunningham - guitar (1999) [For TV Performances]

== Discography ==
=== Studio albums ===
Title	Release	Peak chart positions				Certifications
Title	Release	UK	AUS	CAN	US	Certifications
Electronic	Released: 28 May 1991; Label: Factory	2	42	66	109	BPI: Gold
Raise the Pressure	Released: 8 July 1996; Label: Parlophone	8	94	31	143	BPI: Silver
Twisted Tenderness	Released: 12 April 1999; Label: Parlophone	9	78	—	—	
"—" denotes a recording that did not chart or was not released in that territory.

=== Compilation albums ===
Title	Release	Peak chart positions
Title	Release	UK
Get the Message – The Best of Electronic	Released: 18 September 2006; Label: EMI	194

=== Singles ===
Title	Year	Chart positions										Certifications	Album
Title	Year	UK	AUS	GER	IRE	NLD	SWE	US	US DCP	US DMS	US Alt	Certifications	Album
"Getting Away with It"	1989	12	40	—	—	—	—	38	7	13	4	BPI: Silver	Electronic
"Get the Message"	1991	8	71	37	—	60	—	—	8	15	1		Electronic
"Feel Every Beat"	1991	39	156	—	—	—	—	—	28	—	27		Electronic
"Disappointed"	1992	6	—	20	17	77	14	—	10	6	9		Songs from the Cool World
"Forbidden City"	1996	14	—	—	—	—	31	—	—	—	—		Raise the Pressure
"For You"	1996	16	—	—	—	—	—	—	—	—	—		Raise the Pressure
"Second Nature"	1997	35	—	—	—	—	—	—	—	—	—		Raise the Pressure
"Vivid"	1999	17	—	—	—	—	—	—	—	—	—		Twisted Tenderness
"Late at Night" (withdrawn)	1999	—	—	—	—	—	—	—	—	—	—		Twisted Tenderness
"—" denotes releases that did not chart or were not released.

=== Promotional singles ===
Title	Year	Chart positions	Album
Title	Year	US Alt	Album
"Tighten Up"	1991	6	Electronic
"Until the End of Time"	1997	—	Raise the Pressure
"Prodigal Son"	1999	—	Twisted Tenderness
"Make It Happen"	1999	—	Twisted Tenderness
"—" denotes releases that did not chart or were not released.

=== Music videos ===
Year	Title	Director
1989	"Getting Away with It"	Chris Marker
1990	"Getting Away with It" (US Version)	Greg Copeland and Judith Briant
1991	"Get the Message"	Gunther Deichman
1991	"Feel Every Beat"	Peter Scammell
1992	"Disappointed"	Howard Greenhalgh
1996	"Forbidden City"	Tom Merriton
1996	"For You"	Richard Heslop
1999	"Vivid"	Nick Wood
1999	"Late at Night"	Jason Smith
1999	"Late at Night" (Version 2)	Jason Smith
