= Rewind Festival =

Annual music festival in Britain

- Genre: Pop; new wave; synthpop; rock
- Locations: Scone Palace, Scotland; Capesthorne Hall, England; Remenham, Berkshire
- Years active: 2009–present
- Attendance: 40,000
- Website: rewindfestival.com

The Rewind Festival is an annual music festival that takes place in Temple Island Meadows, Remenham, Berkshire near Henley-on-Thames, England, Capesthorne Hall, Cheshire, England, and Scone Palace, Perthshire in Scotland. It was first held in August 2009.

Originally called "80s Rewind Festival", it showcases bands and solo artists that had success in the 1980s and as such is also known as the 80's Rewind Festival. As well as music, in 2009 the site also featured a fun fair, street entertainment and artists from The Comedy Store.

The festival is run by The Rival Organisation and Into The Groove, and was started after the success of one-off 1980s retro shows of previous years.

Since its creation a number of additional attractions were included at the festival, including a weekend camp site, glamping, firework displays, theme bars, silent disco, roller disco, the Big Sing, live karaoke stage, and the Friday night welcome party.

In 2019 the capacities of the festivals were Scotland: 30,000, South: 40,000, and North: 20,000.

== 80s Rewind Festival 2009 ==
The initial edition took place on the 21, 22 and 23 August 2009. Acts playing include Kim Wilde, Rick Astley, Gloria Gaynor and Sister Sledge.

Saturday	Sunday
Kim Wilde; Rick Astley; Bananarama; Billy Ocean; Belinda Carlisle (also of The Go-Go's); Kid Creole; Heaven 17; Doctor and the Medics; Cutting Crew; Hue & Cry; Toyah Willcox (of Toyah); The Real Thing; China Crisis	Gloria Gaynor; Sister Sledge; ABC; Paul Young; Go West; Midge Ure (of Visage and Ultravox); Howard Jones; Nik Kershaw; T'Pau; The Christians; The Blockheads and Phill Jupitus; Chas & Dave

== Rewind Festival 2010 ==
The second 1980s Rewind Festival took place on 20, 21 & 22 August 2010. The line-up for this event was announced on Thursday 28 January 2010. The event featured a 1980s fancy dress theme using costumes supplied by sponsor Jokers' Masquerade.

Saturday	Sunday
Boy George (of Culture Club); Rick Astley; Level 42; Jimmy Somerville (of Bronski Beat and The Communards); The Weather Girls; T'Pau; Kajagoogoo; Heaven 17; Imagination; Curiosity Killed the Cat; Altered Images; Modern Romance	Tony Hadley (of Spandau Ballet) with ABC and Go West; Marc Almond (of Soft Cell); Björn Again; Midge Ure; Kid Creole and the Coconuts; Chesney Hawkes; 10cc; Hazel O'Connor; Odyssey; Johnny Hates Jazz; The Beat

== Rewind Festival 2011 ==

The third 1980s Rewind Festival held two separate concerts. A number of additional attractions were included at the festival:

- Weekend camp site
- Firework displays
- Theme bars
- Silent disco
- The Big Sing
- Live karaoke stage

=== Perth date ===
The Scottish 1980s Rewind Festival took place at the Scone Palace grounds near Perth on the 29, 30 and 31 July 2011.

Saturday running order	Sunday running order
Bags of Rock; The Beat; The Bluebells; Hue & Cry; Billy Ocean; Cutting Crew; Hazel O'Connor; T'Pau; Kid Creole; Go West; ABC; Bananarama; Tony Hadley & Rick Astley	Modern Romance; China Crisis; The Real Thing; Imagination; Fiction Factory; Toyah; Doctor and the Medics; Heaven 17; Nik Kershaw; Howard Jones; Kim Wilde; The Human League

=== Henley-on-Thames date ===
The English 1980s Rewind Festival took place at Temple Island Meadows, Remenham Farm, Remenham, near Henley-on-Thames on 19, 20 and 21 August 2011.

Saturday running order	Sunday running order
The Real Thing; Earth Wind & Fire Experience feat. Al McKay; Haircut One Hundred; Billy Ocean; Fiction Factory; Katrina and the Waves; Bucks Fizz; ABC; Howard Jones; Bananarama; Village People; Holly Johnson (of Frankie Goes to Hollywood)	China Crisis; Hue & Cry; Average White Band; UB40; Toyah Willcox; Brother Beyond; Captain Sensible; Go West; Candi Staton; Nik Kershaw; Kim Wilde; The Human League

== Rewind Festival 2012 ==
The fourth 1980s Rewind Festival was held on two separate occasions to provide concerts for both Scotland and England.

=== Perth date ===
The Scottish 1980s Rewind Festival took place at the Scone Palace grounds near Perth on 20, 21 and 22 July 2012.

Saturday running order	Sunday running order
Les McKeown's Bay City Rollers; Right Said Fred; Limahl (of Kajagoogoo); Average White Band; Katrina Leskanich (of Katrina and the Waves); Chesney Hawkes; Sinitta; Go West; Five Star; Midge Ure; Jimmy Somerville; Big Country (replacement for Ali Campbell's UB40)	The Christians; The Straits (Dire Straits tribute); The Lightning Seeds; Adam Ant & The Good, The Mad & The Lovely Posse; Altered Images; Wang Chung; John Parr; Roland Gift (of Fine Young Cannibals); ABC; Marc Almond; Village People; Holly Johnson

=== Henley-on-Thames date ===
The English 1980s Rewind Festival took place at Temple Island Meadows, Remenham Farm, Remenham, near Henley-on-Thames on 17, 18 and 19 August 2012.

Saturday running order	Sunday running order
Grandmaster Flash; Right Said Fred; Soul II Soul; The Bangles; Doctor and the Medics; Sinitta; Starship; Heather Small (of Hot House and M People); Five Star; Jimmy Somerville; Rick Astley; Kool & the Gang	The Christians; The Straits; The Lightning Seeds; Adam Ant & The Good, The Mad & The Lovely Posse; Wang Chung; John Parr; T'Pau; Midge Ure; Roland Gift; Marc Almond; Tony Hadley; OMD

== Rewind Festival 2013 ==
=== Perth date ===
The Scottish Rewind Festival took place at the Scone Palace grounds near Perth on 26th, 27 and 28 July 2013.

Saturday running order	Sunday running order
Red Hot Chilli Pipers; Howard Jones; Soul II Soul; Mike & the Mechanics; Odyssey; Captain Sensible; Starship; A Flock of Seagulls; Heather Small; Rick Astley; Kim Wilde; Ali Campbell's UB40	The Blow Monkeys; The Blockheads; Al McKay Allstars (performing the Earth, Wind & Fire Experience); Level 42; Cutting Crew; Sonia; The Flying Pickets; Nik Kershaw; Jason Donovan; Belinda Carlisle; Tony Hadley; The Human League (replacement for OMD)

=== Henley-on-Thames date ===
The English Rewind Festival took place at Temple Island Meadows, Remenham Farm, Remenham, near Henley-on-Thames on 16, 17 and 18 August 2013.

Saturday running order	Sunday running order
Steve Augeri (former lead singer of Journey); The Flying Pickets; Chesney Hawkes; The Blow Monkeys; Steve Harley & Cockney Rebel; The Sugarhill Gang; Heaven 17; Then Jerico; Nik Kershaw; Billy Ocean; Kim Wilde; The B-52's	Matt Bianco; Cutting Crew; Sonia; Imagination (featuring Leee John); Aswad; The Orchestra (former members of Electric Light Orchestra); Belinda Carlisle; Go West; Blancmange; Paul Carrack; ABC; The Pointer Sisters

== Rewind Festival 2014 ==
For 2014, there were three festivals held due to the success from previous years.

=== Perth date ===
The Rewind Festival in Scotland took place at the Scone Palace grounds near Perth on 18, 19 and 20 July 2014.

Saturday running order	Sunday running order
The Sugar Hill Gang; Nick Heyward; Björn Again; 10cc; Doctor and the Medics; Cheryl, Mike & Jay formerly of Bucks Fizz; Steve Augeri former lead singer of Journey; Heaven 17; Midge Ure; Go West; Jimmy Somerville; Billy Ocean	Matt Bianco; The South; The Selecter; The Boomtown Rats; Johnny Hates Jazz; The Christians; T'Pau; Blancmange; Roland Gift; ABC; Marc Almond; Daryl Hall and John Oates

=== Henley-on-Thames date ===
The Rewind Festival South took place at Temple Island Meadows, Remenham Farm, Remenham, near Henley-on-Thames on 15, 16 and 17 August 2014.

Saturday running order	Sunday running order
From The Jam; Nick Heyward; Mike and the Mechanics; Level 42; Johnny Hates Jazz; Wang Chung; Martha Wash The Original Weather Girl; Jason Donovan; Sister Sledge; Marc Almond; Rick Astley; Holly Johnson	The South; Howard Jones; UB40; The Boomtown Rats; Hazel O'Connor; Hugh Cornwell; A Flock Of Seagulls; Bonnie Tyler; Roland Gift; Jimmy Somerville; Tony Hadley; Thompson Twins' Tom Bailey

=== Capesthorne Hall ===
The Rewind Festival North took place at Capesthorne Hall, Cheshire on 29, 30 and 31 August 2014.

Saturday running order	Sunday running order
Billy Ocean; Mike + The Mechanics; Rick Astley; Jimmy Somerville; Marc Almond; Go West; Nik Kershaw; Björn Again; Nick Heyward; The Real Thing; Cutting Crew; Dr & The Medics	Holly Johnson; Level 42; Tony Hadley; Midge Ure; Heaven 17; Roland Gift; The Beat; The Straits; T'Pau; China Crisis; Toyah; Sonia

== Rewind Festival 2015 ==
=== Perth date ===
The Rewind Festival in Scotland took place at the Scone Palace grounds near Perth on 24, 25, and 26 July 2015.

Saturday running order	Sunday running order
From The Jam; Kid Creole & the Coconuts; Howard Jones; The Orchestra; Wang Chung; Altered Images; Hugh Cornwell; Imagination (featuring Leee John); Five Star; Jimmy Somerville; Bananarama; Tom Bailey	Hue and Cry; Aswad; Paul Carrack; Sister Sledge; Toyah Willcox; Dave Edmunds; Hazel O'Connor; Joe Lynn Turner; Belinda Carlisle; Nik Kershaw; Kim Wilde; Orchestral Manoeuvres in the Dark

=== Henley-on-Thames date ===
The Rewind Festival South took place at Temple Island Meadows, Remenham Farm, Remenham, near Henley-on-Thames on 21, 22 and 23 August 2015.

Saturday running order	Sunday running order
Billy Ocean; Orchestral Manoeuvres in the Dark; Kim Wilde; Slim Jim Phantom (of Stray Cats); ABC; Belinda Carlisle; Black Box; Go West; Joe Lynn Turner (from Rainbow); Hot Chocolate; Kid Creole and the Coconuts; Altered Images	Hue & Cry; Soul II Soul; The Selecter; British Electric Foundation (Martyn Ware); Glenn Gregory (of Heaven 17); M (Robin Scott); Thomas Dolby; Eddi Reader (of Fairground Attraction); Peter Hook (of Joy Division and New Order); Shingai Shoniwa (of Noisettes); T'Pau; Midge Ure (also of Ultravox); Dave Edmunds; Nik Kershaw; Bananarama; The Human League; DJ Rusty Egan supplied music during the intervals.

== Rewind Festival 2016 ==
=== Perth date ===
The Rewind Festival in Scotland took place at the Scone Palace grounds near Perth on 23, 23, and 24 July 2016, and was headlined by Holly Johnson on Saturday and Adam Ant on Sunday.

Saturday line up	Sunday line up
Holly Johnson; Tony Hadley; Rick Astley; Marc Almond; Average White Band; Go West; Leo Sayer; The Beat; Snap!; Hazell Dean; Living in a Box; The Bluebells	Adam Ant; Big Country; Midge Ure; ABC; Stray Cats' Slim Jim Phantom; Roland Gift; Annabella's Bow Wow Wow; Toyah; China Crisis; British Electric Foundation featuring: (i) Thomas Dolby; (ii) Mari Wilson; (iii) Heaven 17's Glenn Gregory; (iv) The Farm's Peter Hooton; (v) Noisettes' Shingai Shoniwa

=== Rewind North ===
The 2016 will be held at Capesthorne Hall in Cheshire from 5, 6, 7 August 2016.

Saturday line up	Sunday line up
Adam Ant; Marc Almond; UB40; Midge Ure; Slim Jim Phantom (Stray Cats); Go West; Lloyd Cole & The Leopards; Snap; Annabella's Bow Wow Wow; From the Jam; Doctor & the Medics; Hazell Dean	Thomson Twins' Tom Bailey; Rick Astley; Earth, Wind & Fire Experience; Paul Carrack; Nik Kershaw; Jason Donovan of The Christians; Hazel O'Connor; Rainbow's Joe Lynn Turner; British Electric Foundation featuring: (i) The Noisettes' Shingai Shoniwa; (ii) Joy Division's Peter Hook; (iii) Heaven 17's Glenn Gregory; (iv) Thomas Dolby; (v) Mari Wilson

=== Henley-on-Thames ===
The Rewind Festival South took place at Temple Island Meadows, Remenham Farm, Remenham, near Henley-on-Thames on 19, 20 and 21 August 2016.

Saturday running order	Sunday line up
Tony Hadley with the Southbank Sinfonia; The Real Thing; Lloyd Cole and the Leopards; The Trevor Horn Band (with Lol Creme); Toyah Willcox (of Toyah); Hazell Dean; Penny Ford (of Snap!); Jennie Matthias (of The Belle Stars); Leo Sayer; Jimmy Somerville; Rick Astley; Andy Bell (of Erasure); DJ Rusty Egan supplied music during the intervals.	The Blockheads; The Beat; Earth Wind & Fire Experience Feat The Al McKay All Stars; British Electric Foundation- Jaki Graham, Mari Wilson, The Farm's Peter Hooton, The Lotus Eaters, Claudia Bruken, Heaven 17's Glenn Gregory; Living in a Box; Annabella of Bow Wow Wow; Roland Gift; Marc Almond; Adam Ant; DJ Rusty Egan supplied music during the intervals.

== Rewind Festival 2017 ==
=== Rewind Scotland ===
The Rewind Festival in Scotland took place at the Scone Palace grounds near Perth on 21, 22, and 23 July 2017, and was headlined by The Human League on the Saturday and Billy Ocean on the Sunday.

Saturday line up	Sunday line up
The Human League; Heather Small; Nik Kershaw; Go West; Chesney Hawkes; Musical Youth; T'Pau; Tom Robinson; Level 42; The Trevor Horn Band; The Real Thing; The Undertones	Billy Ocean; Kim Wilde; Jason Donovan; Belinda Carlisle; Nick Heyward; Dr & the Medics; Soul II Soul; Junior Marvin's Wailers; Steve Harley & Cockney Rebel; British Electric Foundation featuring: (i) Thomas Dolby; (ii) Claudia Brücken; (iii) Owen Paul; (iv) Jaki Graham; (v) Joy Division's Peter Hook; (vi) Heaven 17's Glenn Gregory

=== Rewind North ===
The 2017 festival was held at Capesthorne Hall in Cheshire; on the 4, 5 and 6 August 2017.

Saturday line up	Sunday line up
Village People; Sister Sledge; Kim Wilde; Roland Gift; Altered Images; Hugh Cornwell; Tom Robinson; Dr & The Medics; Level 42; The Trevor Horn Band; Peter Hook & The Light; The Blockheads	Status Quo; Belinda Carlisle; Nick Heyward; Toyah; T'Pau; John Parr; The Orchestra; Junior Marvin's Wailers; Johnny Hates Jazz; British Electric Foundation featuring: (i) Claudia Brucken; (ii) Owen Paul; (iii) The Farm's Peter Hooton; (iv) Jaki Graham; (v) Glen Matlock; (vi) Heaven 17's Glenn Gregory

=== Rewind South ===
The Rewind Festival South took place at Temple Island Meadows, Remenham Farm, Remenham, near Henley-on-Thames on 18, 19 and 20 August 2017.

Saturday running order	Sunday line up
Village People; Gloria Gaynor; Nik Kershaw; Nick Heyward; Tom Robinson; Imagination Feat. Leee John; Musical Youth; Dr & The Medics; Level 42; Sugarhill Gang feat. Melle Mel & Scorpio's Furious 5; Big Country; Thriller Live; Mr Motivator	Status Quo; Kim Wilde; Midge Ure; Belinda Carlisle; Go West; Sonia; Junior Marvin's Wailers; The South; The Christians; British Electric Foundation featuring: (i) Heaven 17's Glenn Gregory; (ii) Glen Matlock; (iii) Jilted John; (iv) Kim Appleby; (v) Owen Paul; (vi) Rozalla

== Rewind Festival 2018 ==
=== Rewind Scotland ===
The Rewind Festival in Scotland took place at the Scone Palace grounds near Perth on 20, 21, and 22 July 2018, and was headlined by OMD and Status Quo.

Saturday line up	Sunday line up
OMD; Gipsy Kings featuring Nicolas Reyes & Tonino Baliardo; Martha Wash; Odyssey; Roland Gift; Tiffany; Kim Appleby; Howard Jones; Peter Hook and The Light; Roachford; The Skids	Status Quo; Bonnie Tyler; Midge Ure; Heaven 17; Imagination; A Flock of Seagulls; Wendy James; UB40; The Boomtown Rats; The Selecter; Hue and Cry

=== Rewind North ===
The Rewind North Festival took place at Capesthorne Hall in Cheshire on 3, 4, and 5 August 2018, and was headlined by OMD and the Jacksons.

=== Rewind South ===
The Rewind South Festival took place at the Temple Island Meadows, Remenham Farm, Remenham, near Henley-on-Thames on 17, 18, and 19 August 2018, and was headlined by Kool and the Gang and OMD.

== Rewind Festival 2019 ==
=== Rewind Scotland ===
The Rewind Festival in Scotland took place at the Scone Palace grounds near Perth on 19–21 July. The Friday lineup consisted of Martin Kemp, Magic Nostalgic, and Ray Gun's Look Real Enough on the Forever Stage; Silent Disco, Ceilidh, and Karaoke Rumble in the Disco Den, and Piano Man in Studio 54.

Saturday line up (Main Stage)	Sunday line up (Main Stage)
Foreigner; Lulu; Paul Young; Eddi Reader; Joyce Sims; Black Box; The Dire Straits Experience; The Undertones; The Primitives; Hipsway	Bryan Ferry; The Stranglers; Lisa Stansfield; Belinda Carlisle; Hazel O'Connor; Midge Ure; Leo Sayer; Björn Again; The Skids; Big Country

=== Rewind North ===
The Rewind North Festival was due to take place at Capesthorne Hall in Cheshire from 2–4 August, but was cancelled the day before due to recent weather conditions and flooding. Main artists lined up had included Bananarama, Tiffany, Thin Lizzy, Cutting Crew, and Gloria Gaynor.

=== Rewind South ===
The Rewind South Festival took place at the Temple Island Meadows, Remenham Farm, Remenham, near Henley-on-Thames from 16–18 August. Main artists included Grandmaster Flash, Tiffany, The Waterboys, and Sister Sledge.

== Rewind Festival 2021 ==
After a period of issues related to Covid, the 2020 festival was postponed to 2021, but returned only the Rewing South Festival.

=== Rewind South ===
The Rewind South Festival took place at the Temple Island Meadows, Remenham Farm, Remenham, near Henley-on-Thames from 20–21 August. Main artists included Jimmy Somerville, Wet Wet Wet, Billy Ocean, Roland Gift, The Trevor Horn Band, Bananarama, Soul II, Soul Go West.

== Rewind Festival 2022 ==
After a period of three years, The Rewind Scotland festival returned after the issues related to Covid.

=== Rewind Scotland ===
The Rewind Festival in Scotland took place at Scone Palace grounds near Perth on 22–24 July.

Saturday line up (Main Stage)	Sunday line up (Main Stage)
Billy Ocean; Holly Johnson; Queen symphonic; The Trevor horn band; Roland Gift; Heaven 17; Nik Kershaw; Hue & Cry; T'Pau; The Christans; Altered Images	Wet Wet Wet; Bananarama; Tom Bailey; Heather Small; Shalamer; Hugh Cornwell; The Blow Monkeys; Limahl; Pete Wylie; Owen Paul; Chesney Hawkes

=== Rewind North ===
The Rewind North Festival is due to take place at Capesthorne Hall in Cheshire from 5–7 August, with Holly Johnson and The Human League being the Headline acts

=== Rewind South ===
The Rewind South Festival is place at the Temple Island Meadows, Remenham Farm, Remenham, near Henley-on-Thames from 19–21 August, with Holly Johnson and The Human League being the Headline acts.

== Rewind Festival 2023 ==
=== Rewind Scotland ===
The Rewind Festival in Scotland took place at Scone Palace grounds near Perth on 21–23 July. With Pat Sharp presenting Saturday, while The Doctor presented Sunday.

Saturday line up (Main Stage)	Sunday line up (Main Stage)
Soul to Soul; ABC; Martin Kemp; Nick Heyward; Denise Pearson; Heatwave; The Art of noise; The Farm; Disco inferno; Andy Bell	Tony Hadley; Midge Ure; Go West; Tunde; Hothouse Flowers; Toyah; The South; China Crisis; Brother Beyound; Red Box; Squeeze

=== Rewind North ===
The Rewind North Festival is due to take place at Capesthorne Hall in Cheshire from 4–6 August, with Andy Bell from Erasures and Squeeze being the Headline acts.

=== Rewind South ===
The Rewind South Festival is place at the Temple Island Meadows, Remenham Farm, Remenham, near Henley-on-Thames from 18–20 August, with Andy Bell from Erasures and Squeeze being the Headline acts.

== Rewind Festival 2024 ==
=== Rewind Scotland ===
The Rewind Festival in Scotland took place at Scone Palace grounds near Perth on 19–21 July. With Jenny Powell presenting Saturday, while The Doctor presented Sunday.

Saturday line up (Main Stage)	Sunday line up (Main Stage)
Earth wind and Fire; Roland Gift; Bad Manners; Studio 54 Live; Boyzlife; Tiffany; Kim Wilde; Hue & Cry; Altered Images; Katrina; Headline: Billy Ocean	Gabrielle; Nik Kershaw; Heatwave; David Grant; Heather Small; Shalatak; Midge Ure; Peter Hook and the light; The Selector; Living in a box; Headline: The Boomtown Rats

=== Rewind North ===
The Rewind North Festival is due to take place at Capesthorne Hall in Cheshire from 2–4 August, With Jenny Powell presenting Saturday, while The Doctor presented Sunday.

=== Rewind South ===
The Rewind South Festival is place at the Temple Island Meadows, Remenham Farm, Remenham, near Henley-on-Thames from 16–18 August, With Jenny Powell presenting Saturday, while The Doctor presented Sunday.

== International expansion ==
In 2011, the festival expanded to Australia. However, the first attempt met with failure after a change of venue and loss of overseas artists due to lack of work permits.

Since 2012, the festival has expanded internationally to three venues in South Africa (including Cape Town and Johannesburg in 2012, Cape Town, Johannesburg and Durban in 2015), one in United Arab Emirates (Dubai), and one in Thailand (Bangkok).

== See also ==
- List of music festivals in the United Kingdom
- Temple Island Meadows Rewind event venue
