= Hurley Lock =

Lock and weir on the River Thames in England

Coordinates: 51.5512°N 0.808961°W

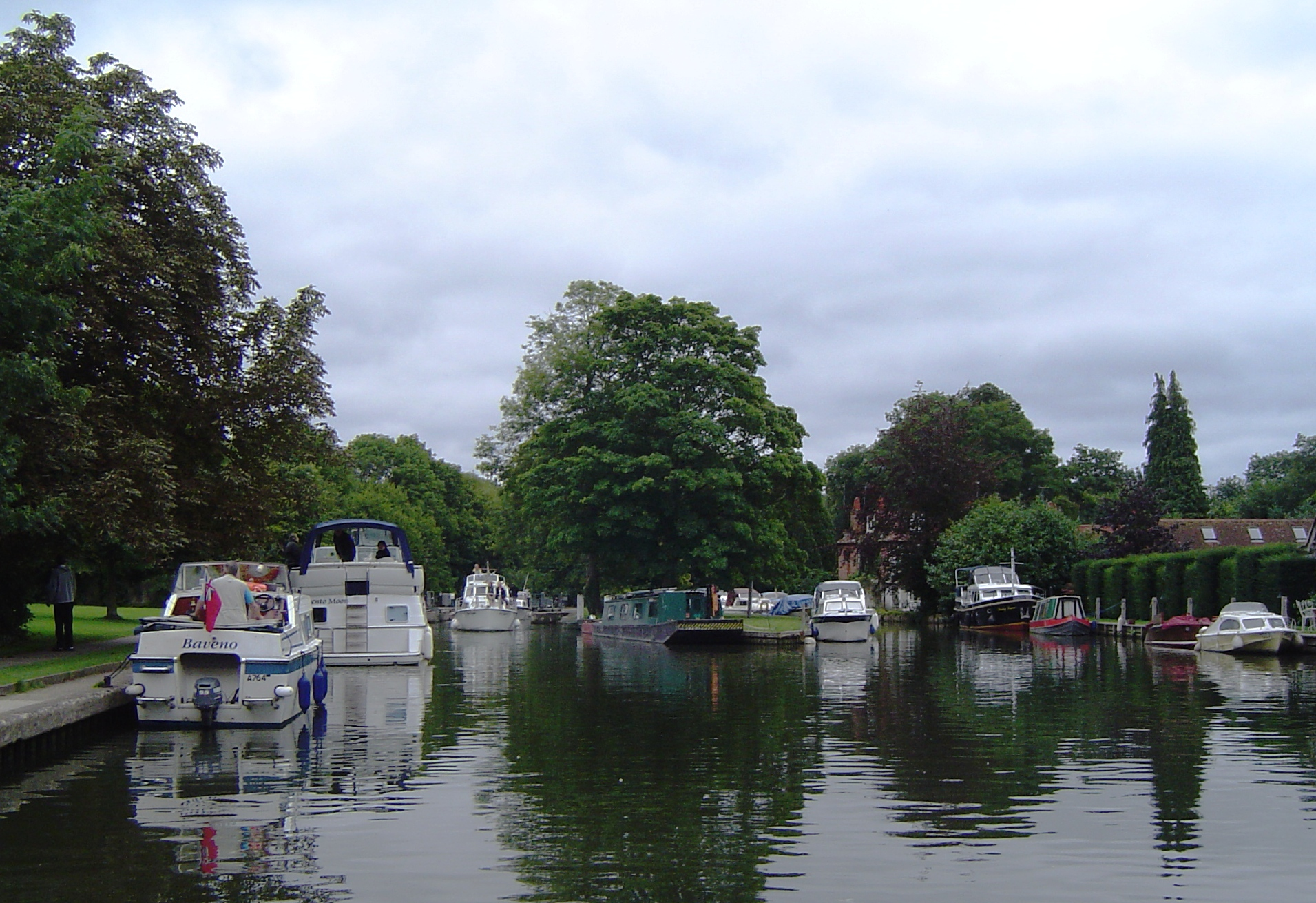
- Hurley Lock and islands from upstream
- Waterway: River Thames
- County: Berkshire
- Maintained by: Environment Agency
- Operation: Hydraulic
- First built: 1773
- Latest built: 1785
- Length: 39.82 m (130 ft 8 in)
- Width: 6.07 m (19 ft 11 in)
- Fall: 1.05 m (3 ft 5 in)
- Above sea level: 96'
- Distance to Teddington Lock: 40 miles

Hurley Lock is a lock and weir on the River Thames in England, situated in a clump of wooded islands close to the village of Hurley, Berkshire. The lock was first built by the Thames Navigation Commissioners in 1773.

There are several weirs between the islands, but the main weir is upstream between the topmost island and the Buckinghamshire bank. The weir is popular with kayakers whenever conditions are favourable, and it is very busy at weekends.

== History ==
There was a Flash lock in the weir here, referred to in the 16th and 17th century as "New Lock". The pound lock was opened in 1773, being the fifth downstream of the eight original locks built after the 1770 navigation act. It was constructed of fir wood, and like the other locks, where the fir was subsequently replaced by oak, it was in decay and in need of repair in 1780 and 1785. On the latter occasion, the owner of the flash lock was instructed to keep it in good repair for use by barges. Further repair was made in 1791, and in 1910, it still had timber sides. It has since been replaced by masonry.

The timber weir winch, looking like a capstan and which was used to pull boats through the Flash Lock, is still at the lock.

== Access to the lock ==
The lock and weir are easily reached by a short footpath from the free car park, which is at the end of Hurley High Street in the village of Hurley on the south bank of the river.

== Reach above the lock ==
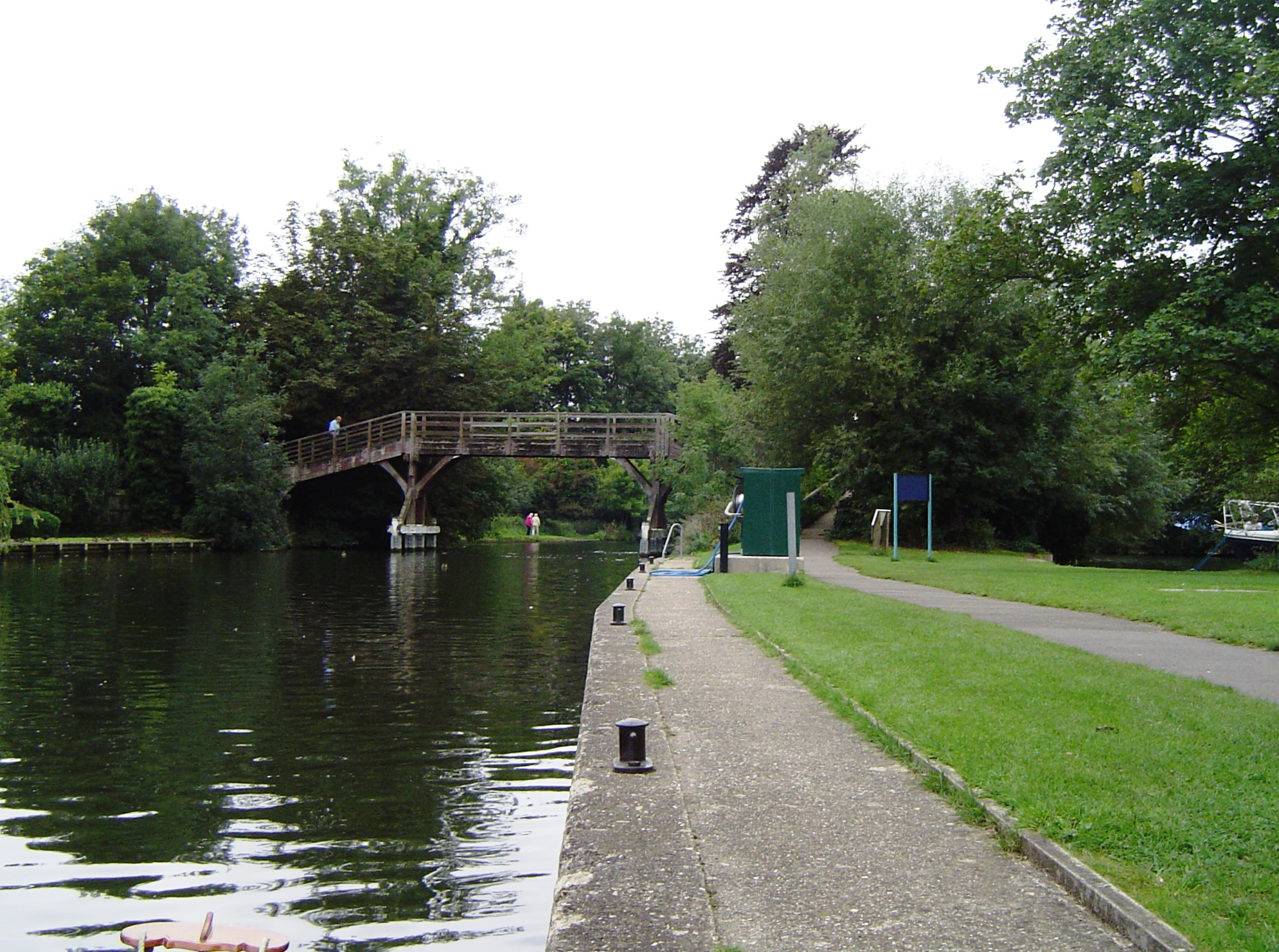
Lock cut above the lock

A short way upstream on the Buckinghamshire bank is Medmenham Abbey home of the notorious Hell Fire Club. The river winds through open country with the paired Frog Mill Ait and Black Boy Island on a sharp bend in the river. Magpie Island is close to Culham Court on the way to Hambleden and Hambleden Lock.

=== Thames Path ===
The Thames Path remains on the Berkshire side and deviates away from the river to the village of Aston, Berkshire, before returning and continuing to Hambledon Lock.

== Kayaking ==
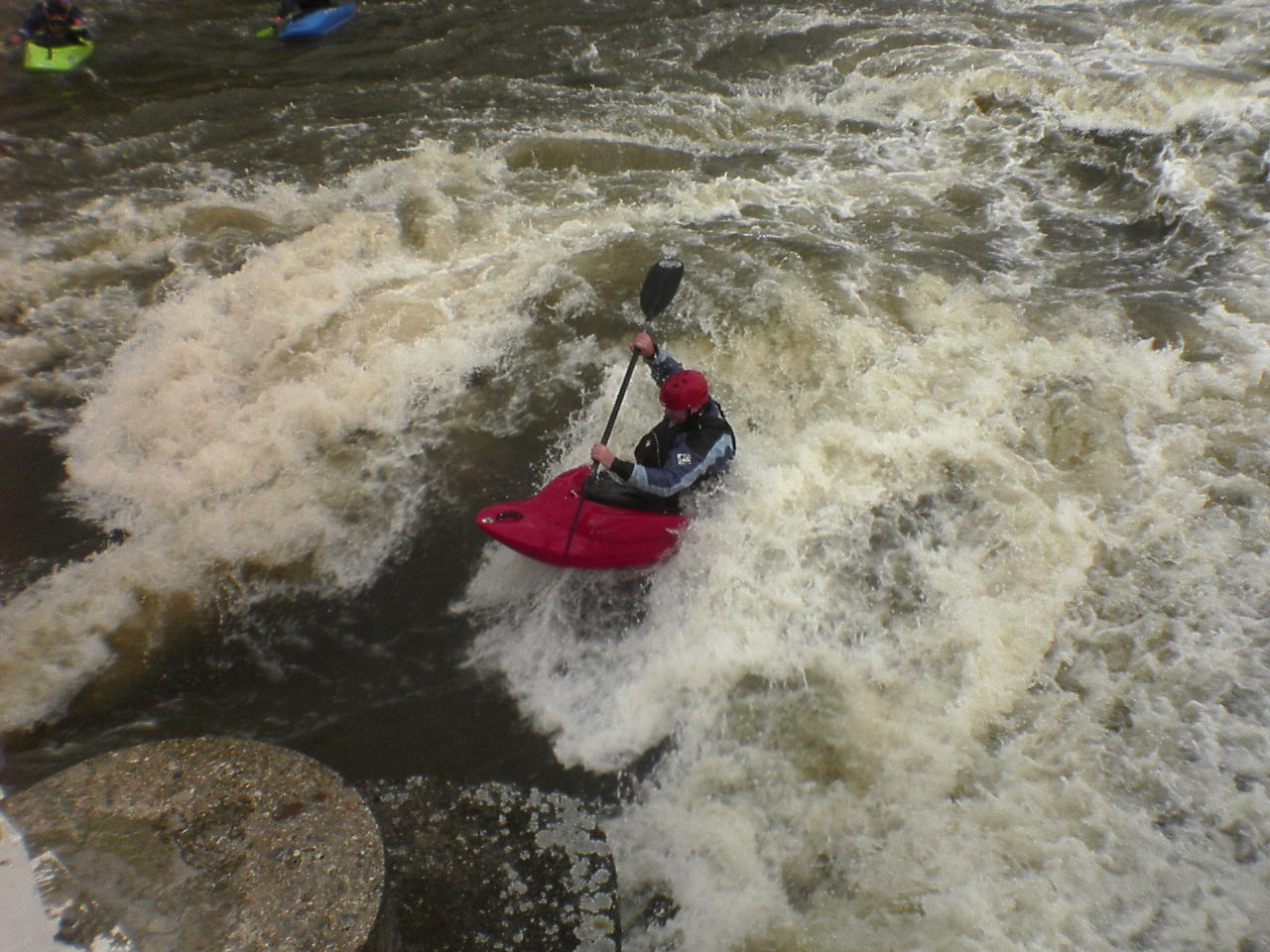
Playboating at Hurley Weir on 2 gates

Hurley is an active freestyle kayaking centre because of the favourable size and shape of the wave. The gates – those which are open – generate a standing wave. Hurley also hosts an annual rodeo competition, the Hurley Classic.

=== Access ===
Two paths, one on either side of the car park, lead to the river and kayakers can put-in on a flat stretch immediately as they arrive at the river, from the car park side. To reach the wave, they must paddle upstream (left) and the weir will appear on the right. The first weir should be ignored, as it is unrunnable. Hurley Weir's steps can be run, but will wear the hull of a kayak, and so is advisable to get out at the island where the weir steps, start and put in at the shingle "beach" below.

=== Gates ===
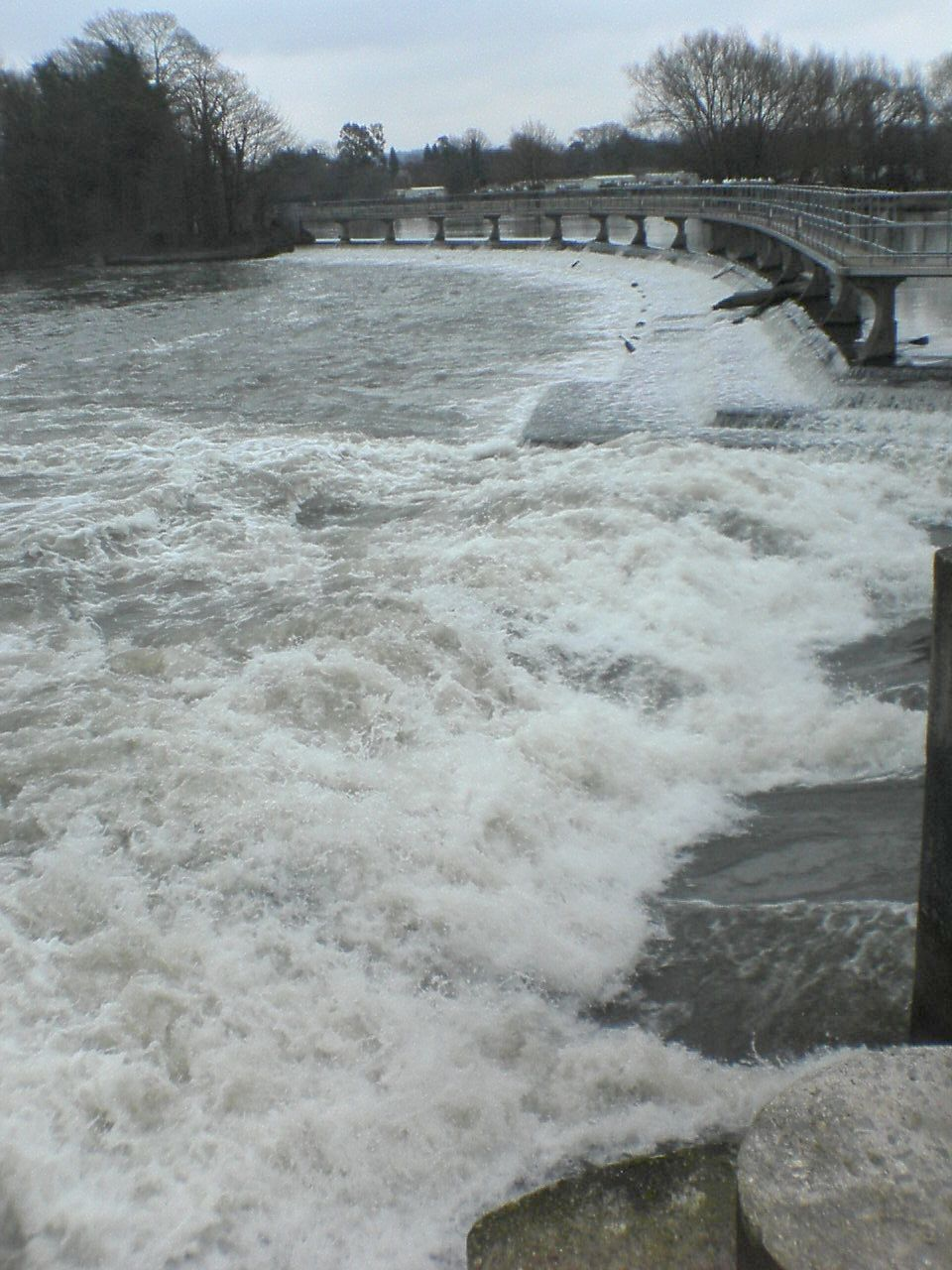
Hurley weir with all 4 gates open

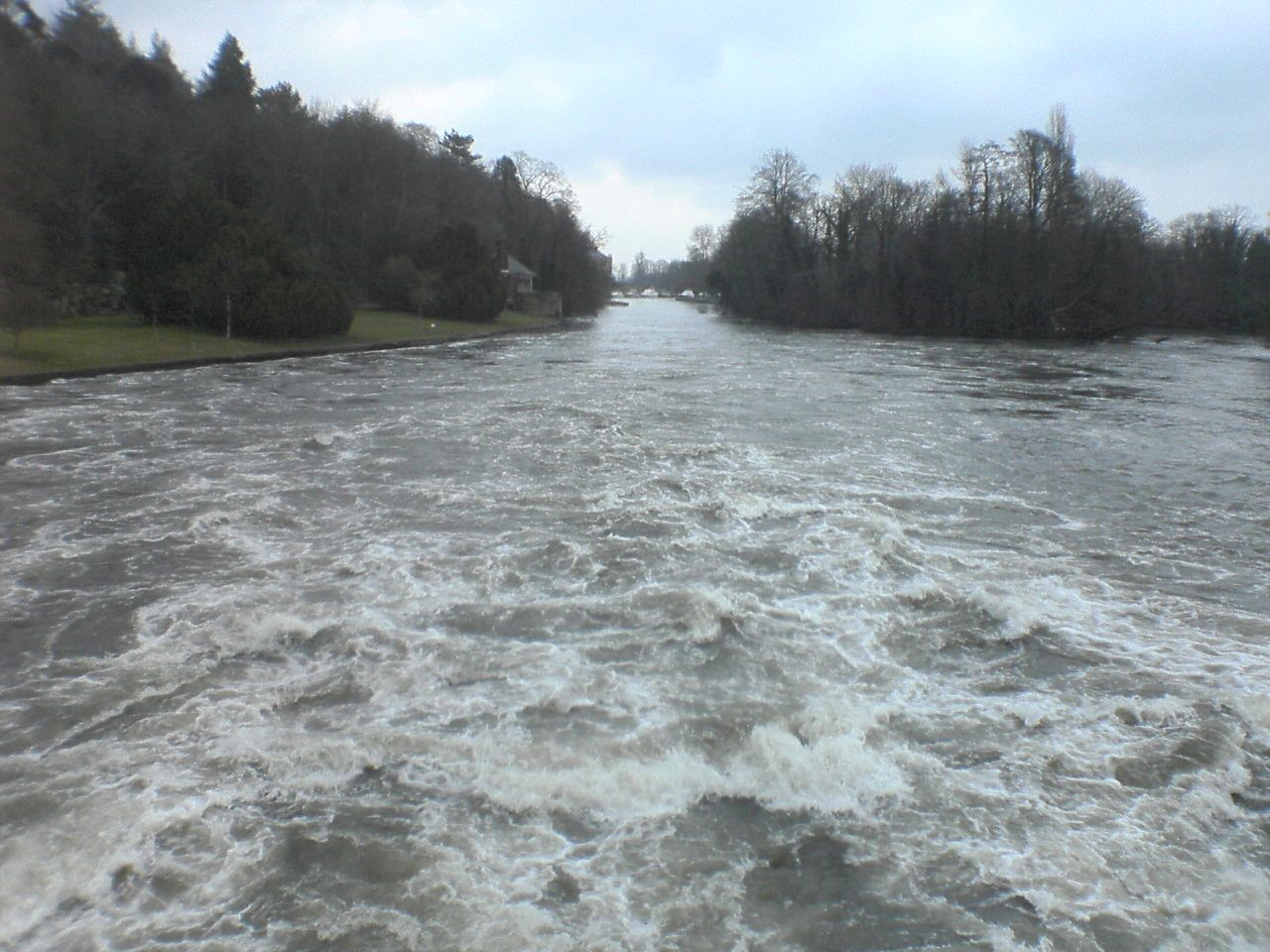
Hurley weir on 4 gates. Looking Downstream

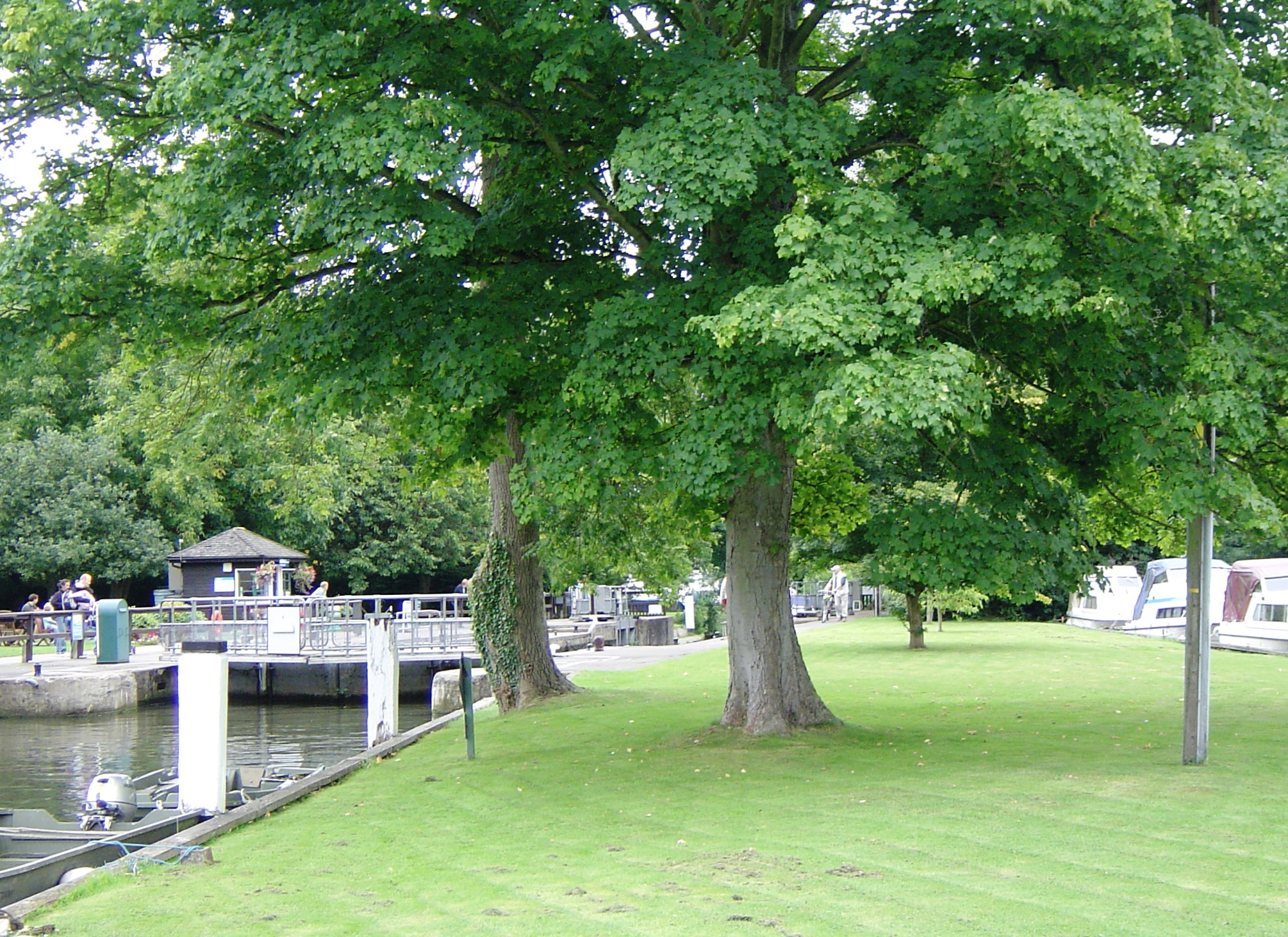
Hurley Lock head gates

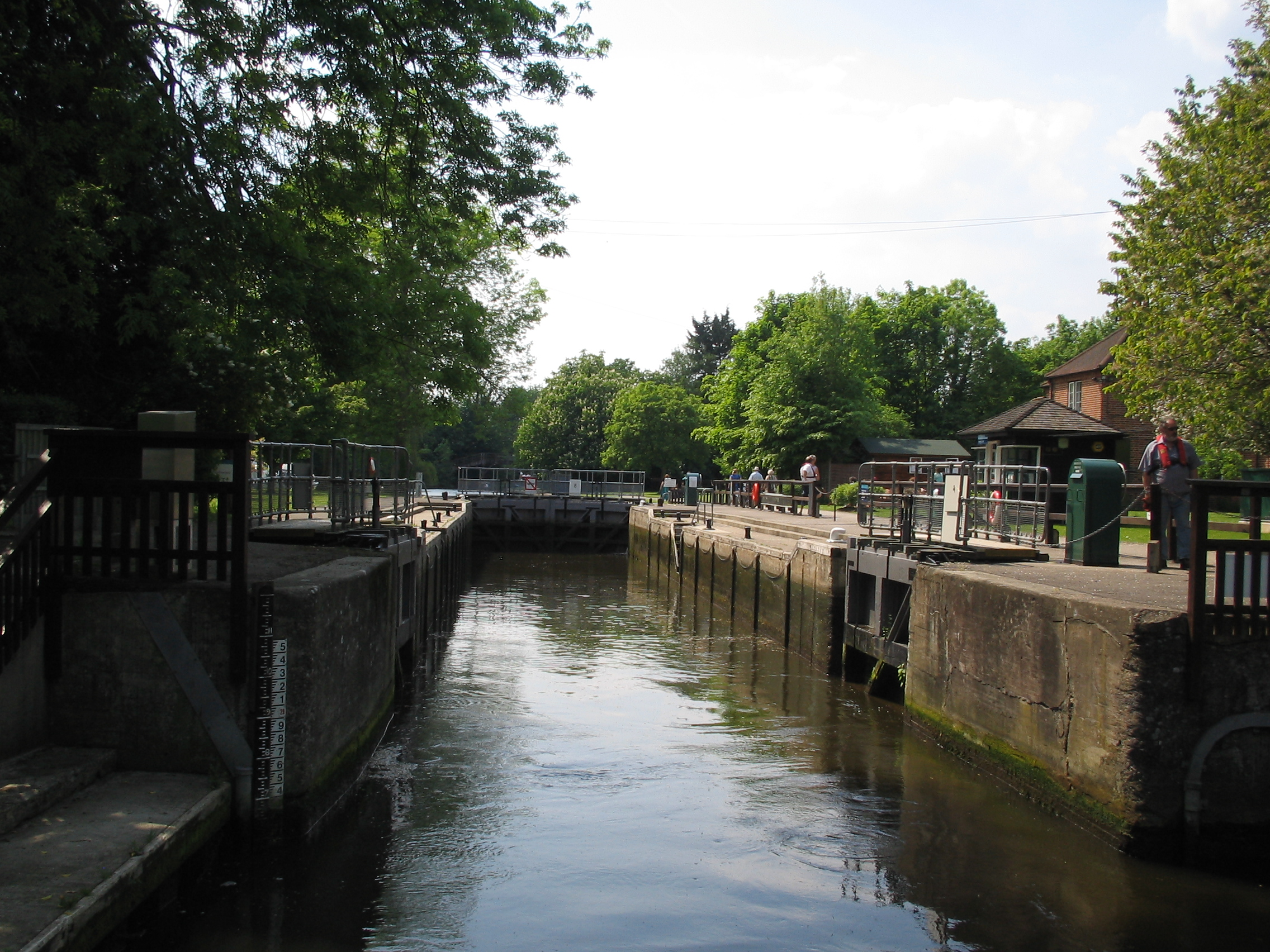
Hurley Lock with the tail gates open

The four main weir gates are opened and closed to control the river levels. The number of opened gates will also determine the nature of the wave/waves, and the suitability/difficulty level for kayakers:

- 1 Gate – Medium-sized wave, normally on weir river right. Best for longer, faster boats.
- 2 Gates – Big wave accompanied by a large hole.
- 3 Gates – Optimum level. When the 3 gates opened on river left, classic conditions apply: a big central wave with two holes either side. Does not normally stay on 3 for long, and during peak periods there can be queues of 40 or more people.
- 4 Gates – A powerful set of linked holes. The furthest hole away from the eddy is sometimes referred to as "The Dark Side", as it is the furthest away from the only eddy. Still relatively safe, but retentive at certain levels. Capsizing results in a flush the vast majority of the time.

Note: at certain levels, the wave train often "goes left" and turns the eddy in a large spinning mass. This has the effect of constantly pushing people who are queuing in the eddy into the main current.

=== Water levels ===
Usually more rainfall means more gates will be open, but this also depends upon the levels at weirs upstream, and as such it can be difficult to predict.

For the weir to form a good wave for kayakers, it generally needs to be late autumn, winter or early spring. Hurley is known to work during the summer, but for short periods of time. 9 months is the average consistent period of use. During the winter, a vague rule of thumb is 10 mm of rain is needed to open a gate. In the summer 15 mm may be required, and persistent rain is needed to keep levels up, due to ground levels of water being lower.

== Literature and the Media ==
Jerome K Jerome wrote [I] often thought I could stay a month without having sufficient time to drink in all the beauty of the scene.

== See also ==
- Locks on the River Thames
- Kayaking and Canoeing on the River Thames

Next lock upstream	River Thames	Next lock downstream
Hambleden Lock; 5.89 km (3.66 mi)	Hurley Lock; Grid reference: SU827842	Temple Lock; 1.03 km (0.64 mi)
