= Rod Stephen =

Australian musician (born 1958)

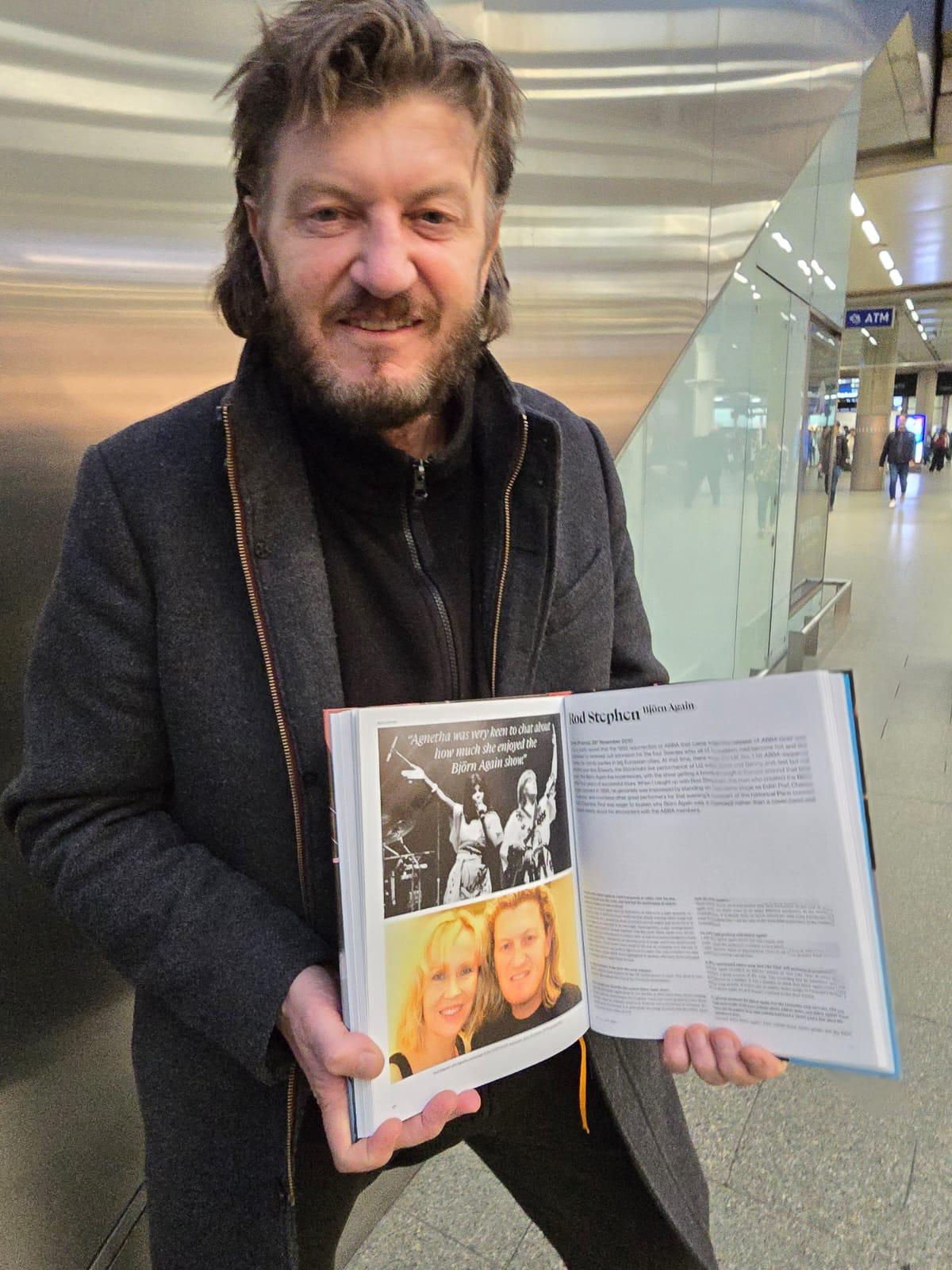
Rod Stephen in London (2024)

Rod Stephen, married under the name Rod Leissle and born as Rod Woolley (Melbourne, 24 October 1958), is an Australian musician, show producer and singer-songwriter from Nunawading, Victoria, Australia. In a music career spanning 40 years, he came to be known in October 1988 as the creator of the Australian ABBA show Björn Again (the name formally Rod's skiing pseudonym). The Björn Again show has widely acknowledged as the catalyst which brought about the 1990s ABBA revival as well as having paved the way for the global tribute band phenomena.

== Early life ==
Rodney Stephen Woolley was born in Box Hill, Victoria, Australia to an English immigrant father William Woolley (1935–1998) and Australian mother Joan Margaret Traynor (1935– ) The couple married in South Melbourne in 1955. Rod was raised in suburban Forest Hill, Nunanwading Melbourne Victoria.

Rod was schooled at Forest Hill Primary and Nunawading High from 1964 to 1977. Having enjoyed sports earlier on Rod focussed his last years of schooling on a new found a love of music including Slade, Alice Cooper, Mike Oldfield, Genesis, Yes, Gentle Giant along with some Australian music and most impotrtantly New Zealands Split Enz which Rod connected with affording him a masterclass in songwriting and arranging and live theatrics. After schooling Rod drifted from job to job before joining CRC working in a metallurgical research centre whilst studying computer science at RMIT (1986–1988).

In 1986 Rod had taken up skiing throughout the winter. It was in this time it was decided he and his friends should adopt new weekend personas just for fun by becoming alter egos with comedy Scandic / European names Hans Danderblaus, Benny Theredonethat and Björn Again (Rod's name). Rod had been to see the newly released Blues brothers and Spinal Tap films which were inspirational and part of the driving force for him to develop a new musical concept. In 1988 ABBA's music had all but fallen into oblivion. Rarely seen on Television or in print media nor heard on Radio any more ABBA were deemed to be a bit "old Hat".

== Starting up Björn Again ==
In 1988 at 29 years of age Stephen was at a crossroads with his music. The Crows had disbanded only weeks before. Whilst enjoying his work at CRC, Stephen still wanted to be involved with something musical that would have an impact on the Australian music Industry. Stephen cited the niche ABBA filled as a contributing factor towards his decision to form his own band.

The Beatles, Queen and ABBA and The Bay City Rollers were all initial considerations since they all had many hits. ABBA had more intrigue as they were Scandinavians singing in English and were once married (which gave scope for some onstage parody) ABBA's music could be ocked up a bit (which they did live themselves anyway).

Rod Stephen believed costumes based on ABBA white kimonos would have the most appeal when compared to Queen and The Beatles. Rod had not come up with any names for a Beatles or Queen tribute band. Stephen ended up writing 50 names down, but ultimately settled on Björn Again, based on the skiing name he used.

Throughout the rest of the first weekend Rod spoke to musical colleague Andrew Cocks who thought the idea of Björn Again was too far fetched - also family and other friends as well as former Crows bandmate Peter Ryan about this concept. Peter agreed it sounded good and was convinced that the other Crow Gavin would want to be a part of too which was when Rod started drafting an advertsiment for two new female singers.

== On tour ==
- 1988 / 1989 Rehearsals / first shows in Melbourne (Rod performing as Björn Volvo-us)
- 1990 – Sweden tour
- 1991 – Rest of the world
- 1999 - Lokerse Feesten
- 2010 - Tampa (USA)
- 2011 - Shetland
- 2018 - Cardiff (Wales),
- 2019 – Glastonbury (UK)
- 2021 – Manchester (UK)
- 2023 – Inverness (Scotland), Oman
- 2025 – Brighton (UK), Dublin (Ireland)

== TV and radio ==
- In 1975 Rod was interviewed by Australian TV presenter / DJ Greg Evans for a Channel 10 ABBA special filmed in Nunawading declaring "I am not a big fan of ABBA's music but I really fancy the two girls!!"
- In 1990 Australia CH9 "The Documentary Björn Again" (Super Channel)
- In 1991 Rod appeared with Björn Again on Johnathon Ross Channel X. Rod appeared with Björn Again on National TV SWEDEN "Nattkafe" to promote ABBA Gold (ABBA's first compilation CD)
- In 1992 BBC TV TOTP / BBC at the Pebble Mill Studios – "A little respect" MTV ABBA weekend "Stop"
- BBC 1 Blue Peter: twice
- In 1999 Ch5: documentary ABBA Björn Again
- In 2005 Zoe Ball 'Faking it Ireland' at Oxegen with Green Day and a special television performance with Zoe Ball's "Faking It" Ex-Blue Peter presenters Peter Duncan, Janet Ellis, Stuart Miles and Romana D'Annunzio
- Itv this morning
- 2008 BBC 1 Graham Norton One & only show
- 2008 BBC 1 Breakfast 20th anniversary interview
- 2009 BBC 1 Breakfast Putin
- 2010 Sotogrande Television's Martine Williams interviewing Björn Again founder Rod Stephen at the Bullring in Marbella, Spain
- 2019 BBC Radio 2: Zoe Ball performance before opening Glastonbury Pyramid stage
- 2019 Gogglebox Shaun Ryder / Bez Happy Mondays
- 2020 Victoria Derbyshire interview
- 2021 BBC Radio 4: "The crazy thing was looking out and seeing a sea of very young faces enjoying Abba's music," Rod Stephen, co-founder of Bjorn Again, told BBC Radio 4's Today programme on Friday."
- 2023 SKY TV Never Mind the Buzzcocks Christmas
- 2024 Steve Blame

== Books and other projects ==
- Bondi Bruce (Bruce Hopkins) – Animated TV talk show host and part-tie surf lifesaver Ch4 Big Breakfast in 2000 at Sydney Olympics
- Don't fight the band that heeds you – TV documentary about ABBA / Pink Floyd and their tributes with Storm Thorgerson
- Rod Operation Sterling – Scotland Yard international police project (The winner takes it all)
- In 2018 Rod featured in Stany Van Wymeersch's book 'We all love ABBA' and also in 2023 for the Expanded Edition.
