= Magpie Island =

Island in the River Thames in Berkshire, England

Coordinates: 51.5480°N 0.8562°W

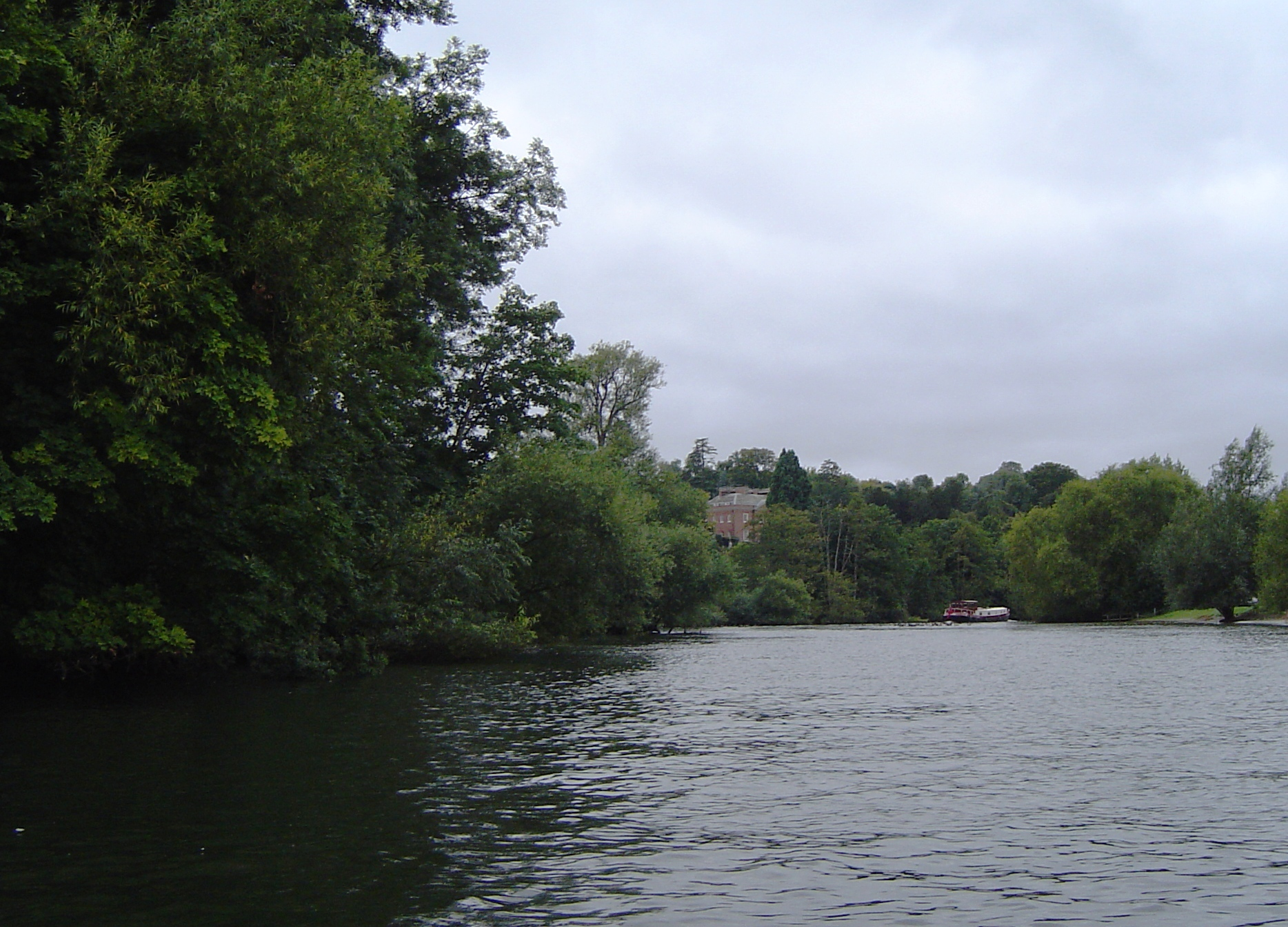
Magpie Island with Culham Court beyond

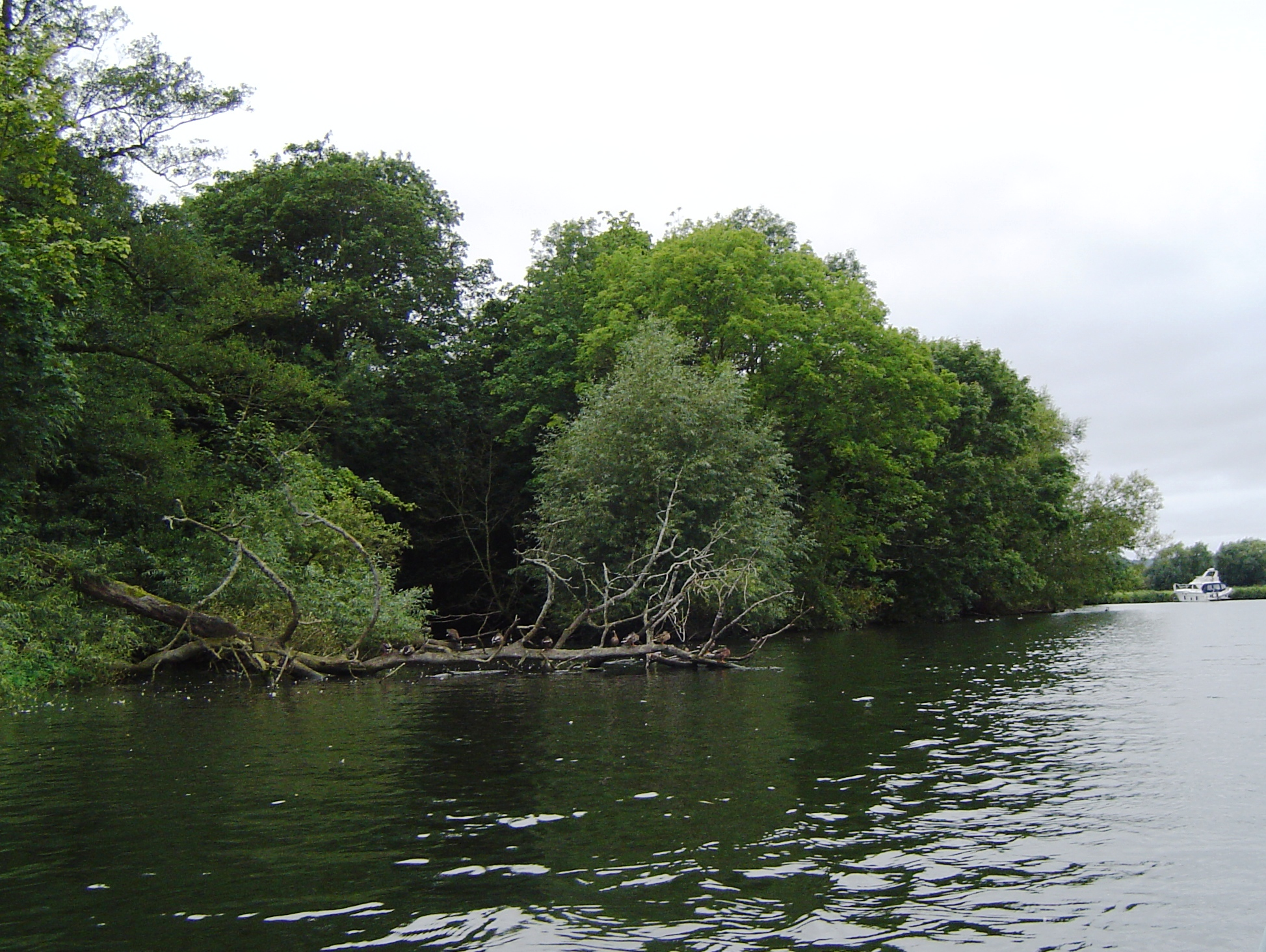
Channel in the middle of Magpie Island

Magpie Island is an island in the River Thames in England near the villages of Aston, Berkshire and Medmenham, Buckinghamshire. It is situated on the reach above Hurley Lock.

Navigation is believed to have passed originally down the present backwater which was then cluttered with eel bucks. In the eighteenth century the island was part of the Culham Court estate.

| Next island upstream | River Thames | Next island downstream |
| Temple Island | Magpie Island | Black Boy Island |
