= Frog Mill Ait =

Island in the River Thames, England

Coordinates: 51.5451°N 0.8308°W

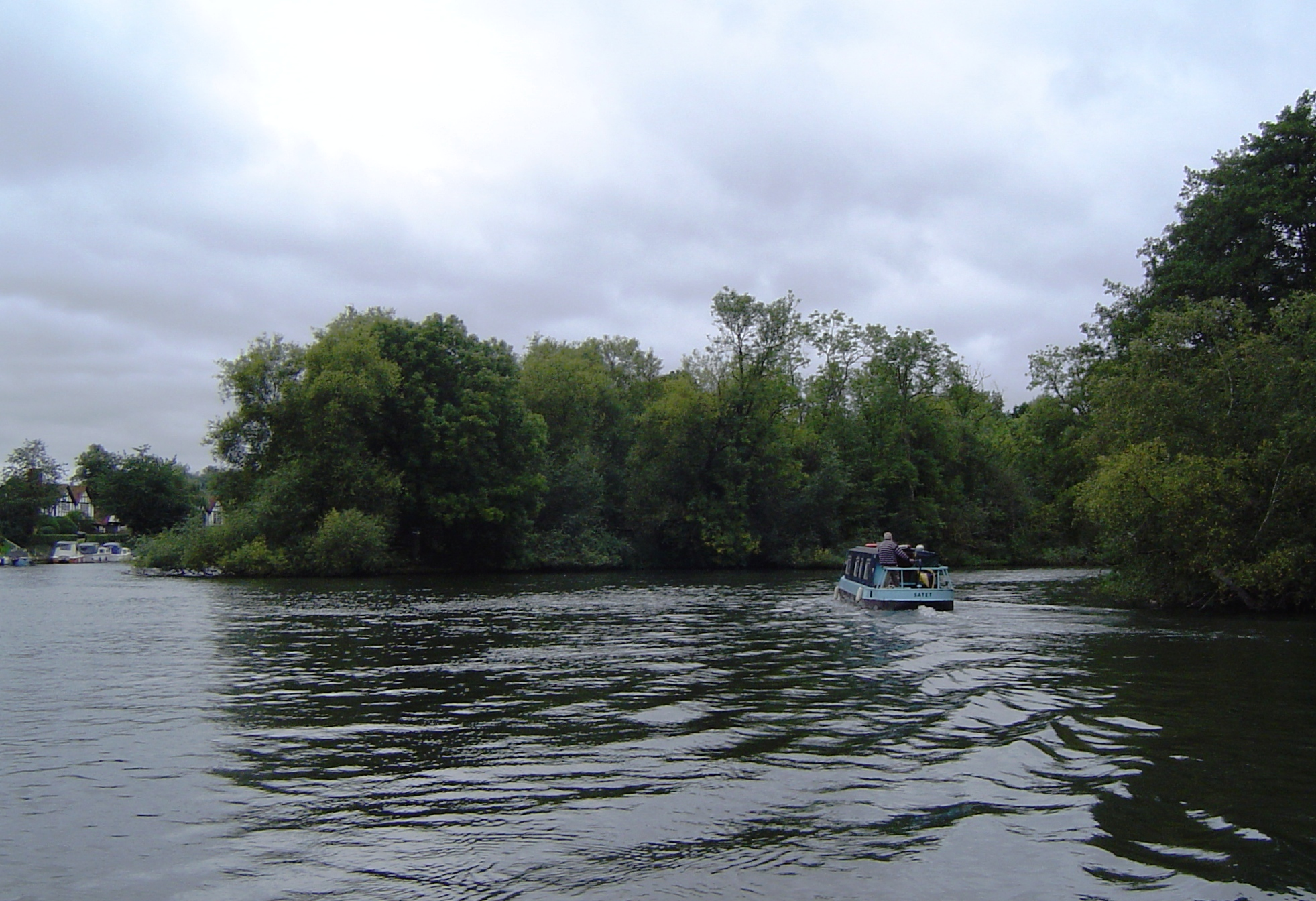
Frog Mill Ait from downstream

Frog Mill Ait is an island in the River Thames in England between the villages of Medmenham, Buckinghamshire and Hurley, Berkshire. It is situated on the reach above Hurley Lock.

The island is named after a mill on the bank here. Frog Mill Ait and the adjacent Black Boy Island presented a problem to navigation because the towpath was on the other side of the island from the main navigation channel. Hence tow lines had to sweep over the islands, often with the result that barges were pulled onto the shore.

The name "Poisson Deux" is associated with the area, and this is believed to derive from fish ducts or traps in the river here.

Frog Mill Ait is in the Berkshire side of the River Thames, west of London.

== See also ==
- Islands in the River Thames

Next island upstream	River Thames	Next island downstream
Black Boy Island	Frog Mill Ait	Temple Mill Island
