= Black Boy Island =

Island in the River Thames, England

Coordinates: 51.5450°N 0.8333°W

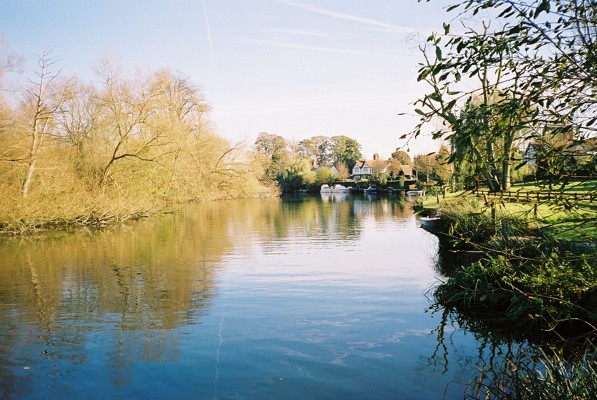
View towards Frogmill from Black Boy Island

Black Boy Island is an uninhabited island in the River Thames in England between the villages of Medmenham, Buckinghamshire and Hurley, Berkshire. It is situated alongside the small hamlet of Frogmill, on the southern side of the stretch of river above Hurley Lock, and is within the Royal Borough of Windsor and Maidenhead unitary authority.

The island is very low-lying, such that it is covered with water whenever the Thames floods. It is now heavily wooded, but up until the 1920s it and the adjacent Frog Mill Ait were without vegetation. This was because the towpath was (and still is) on the southern side of the island whilst the boats being towed along by horses had to keep to the main navigation channel on the northern side of the river. The tow lines had to sweep over the islands, and the angle of tow was such that barges could be pulled aground onto the islands.

Black Boy island is in the Berkshire side of the River Thames, west of London.

== Names ==
The island is at the point where Black Boy Lane meets the Thames. This lane leads from the A4130 Henley Road, the main road from Maidenhead to Henley. Where the lane meets the main road is Black Boys Inn, which claims to date back to the 16th century. In common with various such inns around the country, the inn is said to be named after Charles II who was so dark as a child that his mother called him "Black Boy". The lane next to it took the same name, as the island formed directly alongside Black Boy Lane it has come to share the name.

Another curious nearby name is an old house called "Poisson Duc", locally corrupted to Poison Duck. The name is in Norman French, indicating the site was the fish keeper's cottage, for the Norman Lord of the Manor. Domesday Book recorded that Hurley had been held before the conquest by Esgar, on behalf of King Edward), and by 1086 it was held by was part of the lands of Geoffrey de Mandeville, whose family went on to become Earls of Essex. Domesday records two fisheries at Hurley, worth 12 shillings annually. These would have used fish ducts or traps in the river here to catch fish travelling up or down the Thames.

== See also ==
- Islands in the River Thames

Next island upstream	River Thames	Next island downstream
Magpie Island	Black Boy Island	Frog Mill Ait
