= Björn Again =

Australian pop musical group

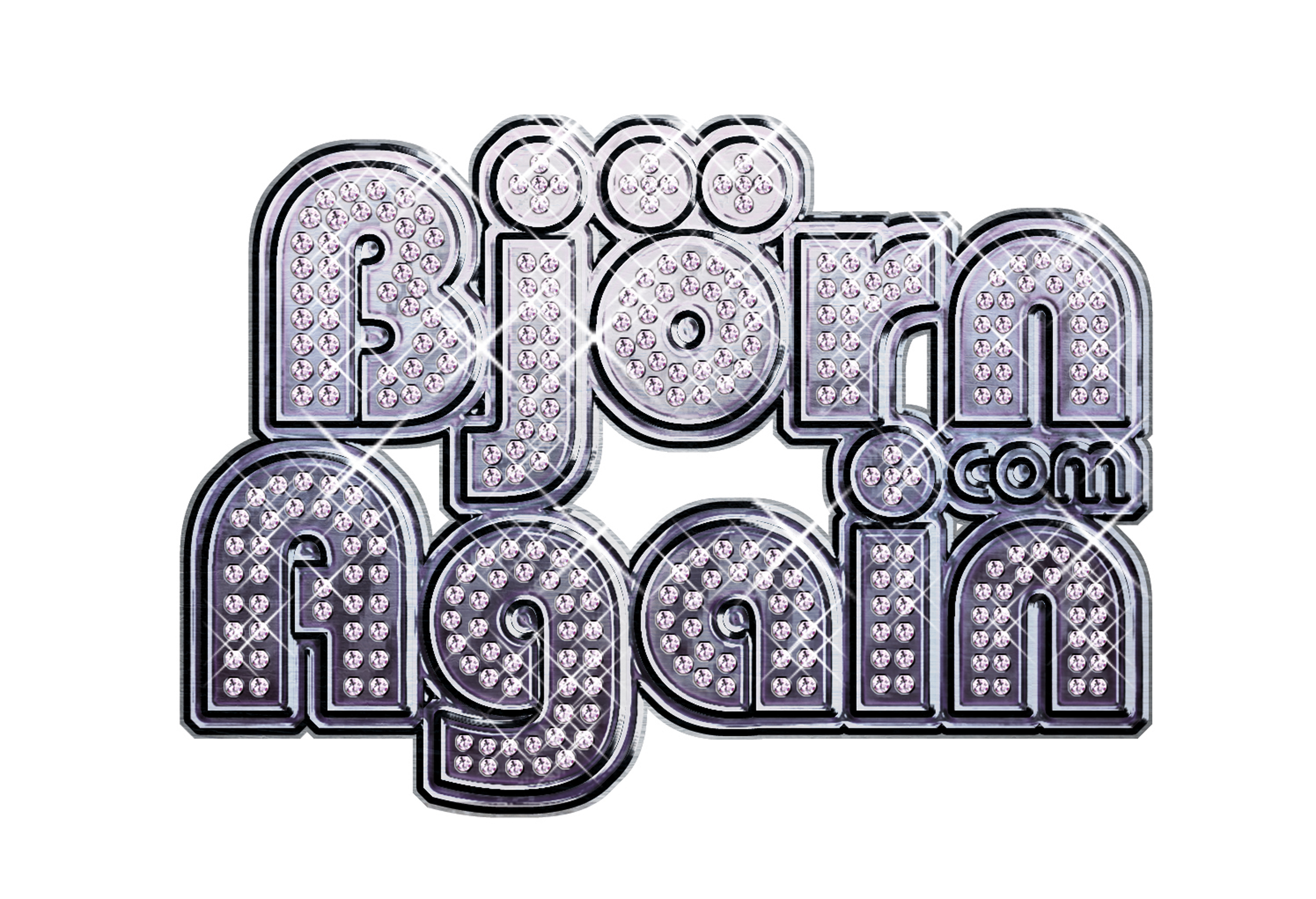
- Band logo

Background information
- Origin: Melbourne, Victoria, Australia
- Genres: Pop, Europop, disco
- Years active: 1988–present
- Website: bjornagain.com

Björn Again are an Australian ABBA-inspired tribute band, consisting of performers from various countries. The name is a pun on the name of ABBA guitarist and vocalist Björn Ulvaeus and the doctrine of being born again. The band has performed worldwide since it was formed in 1988.

== Character of the show ==
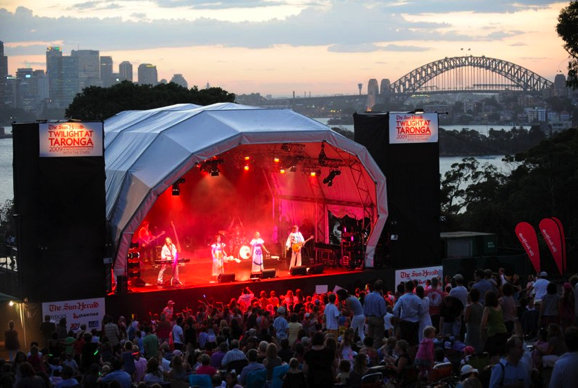
Björn Again performing in Sydney, 2009

Björn Again parodies Swedish pop group ABBA, using a mix of English and Swedish language known as "Swenglish" or pidgin Swedish. The performers use the stage names Agnetha Falstart, Benny Anderwear, Frida Longstokin and Björn Volvo-us in homage to the original ABBA members, plus bassist Rutger Sonofagunn and drummer Ola Drumkitt, based on Rutger Gunnarsson and Ola Brunkert. The show features choreographed acts with unique costumes and song arrangements that differ from ABBA's original performances.

== History ==
Original logo for Björn Again, still in use by the Australasian lineup

Björn Again was founded in 1988 in Melbourne, Australia, by Rod Stephen and John Tyrrell. The style is a light-hearted parody of ABBA performed in pidgin Swedish or 'Swenglish.' Original band members included Rod Stephen, Peter Ryan, John Tyrrell, Dorina Morelli, Kathy Riseborough, Gavin Charles, and later Janette Stuart. Since the band's debut in 1989, Björn Again has performed approximately 5,500 shows in 72 countries over 34 years. By 1997, the band had three touring lineups. John Tyrrell has been the band's manager since the outset. Rod Stephen manages the UK/Europe lineup and John Tyrrell manages the Australasian lineup.

The band has recorded and performed live a total of 133 songs, including 55 ABBA songs, seven originals, and 62 covers by other artists. They released an EP of covers of Erasure songs performed in the style of ABBA, called Erasure-ish, which included the songs "Stop!" and "A Little Respect" that reached Number 25 on the UK Singles Chart in September 1992.

Björn Again has performed at events worldwide, ranging from large rock festivals, including Reading and Glastonbury, to private performances for celebrities, including Microsoft co-founder Bill Gates, comedian Rowan Atkinson, actor Russell Crowe, and Russian president Vladimir Putin and most recently at Barn and Ellie’s wedding at Ty Fry Manor.

In 1999, the UK Bjorn Again took part in a documentary for Channel 5 entitled "ABBA: Bjorn Again!", which featured the band on tour. Throughout the program the band members spoke in "Swenglish" accents. Björn Ulvaeus and Benny Andersson have both praised Björn Again. After ABBA's former members said they were not going to perform together again, Andersson was quoted as saying in 1999, "Bjorn Again are the closest you can get to seeing ABBA."

The band attended a celebrity gala in costume at the London Savoy and received an award on behalf of ABBA from the Radio Times, to commemorate the 30 years since their Eurovision Song Contest win with "Waterloo" in Brighton on 6 April 1974.

In 2009 the band performed Metallica's "Enter Sandman", with an additional drummer, to a Sonisphere Festival crowd at Knebworth, as a nod to the headlining act. They were the opening act on the Pyramid stage at the Glastonbury Festival in 1999, 2009, and 2019.

On 17 December 2012, Björn Again performed at the Buckingham Palace Christmas party in London, attended by the Queen and members of the royal family. They also presented a show in honor of Agnetha Fältskog at Stockholm's TV3/TV6 tenth-anniversary party, when Fältskog was quoted saying “It was a great show. I loved the choreography" and "Good luck for the tour.”

== Discography ==
=== Albums ===
List of albums, with selected chart positions
Title	Album details	Peak chart positions
Title	Album details	AUS
Live Album	Released: 1993; Format: CD, LP; Label: Festival (D19952)	102 (Note: Live Album was re-released in 1995 with Flashback!, where it peaked at number 102.)
Flashback!	Released: August 1994; Format: CD, LP; Label: Festival (D31176)	40
Live at the Royal Albert Hall	Released: 1998; Format: CD; Label: BA (BACD 2010)	–
20th Anniversary Concert	Released: 2009; Format: CD; Label: The Music Group	–

=== Singles ===
List of singles, with selected chart positions
Year	Title	Peak chart positions		Album
Year	Title	AUS	UK	Album
1992	"Erasure-ish" ("A Little Respect"/"Stop!") (Europe only)	—N/a	25	Flashback!
1992	"Santa Claus Is Coming to Town" / "Little Drummer Boy"	105	55	Non-album single
1993	"Flashdance...What a Feeling"	27	65	Flashback!
1993	"So You Win Again" (Europe only)	—N/a	–	Flashback!
1994	"Yes Sir, I Can Boogie" (Australia only)	121	–	Flashback!
1995	"Black Is Black" / "I'm on Fire" (Australia only)	166	–	Flashback!
2019	"Christmas Is Björn Again" ("Keeping the Dream Alive"/ "Underneath the Tree"/"Human"/"Love's Not Just for Christmas")	–	–	Non-album single
