= Remenham =

Coordinates: 51°33′04″N 0°53′24″W

- Village and civil parish
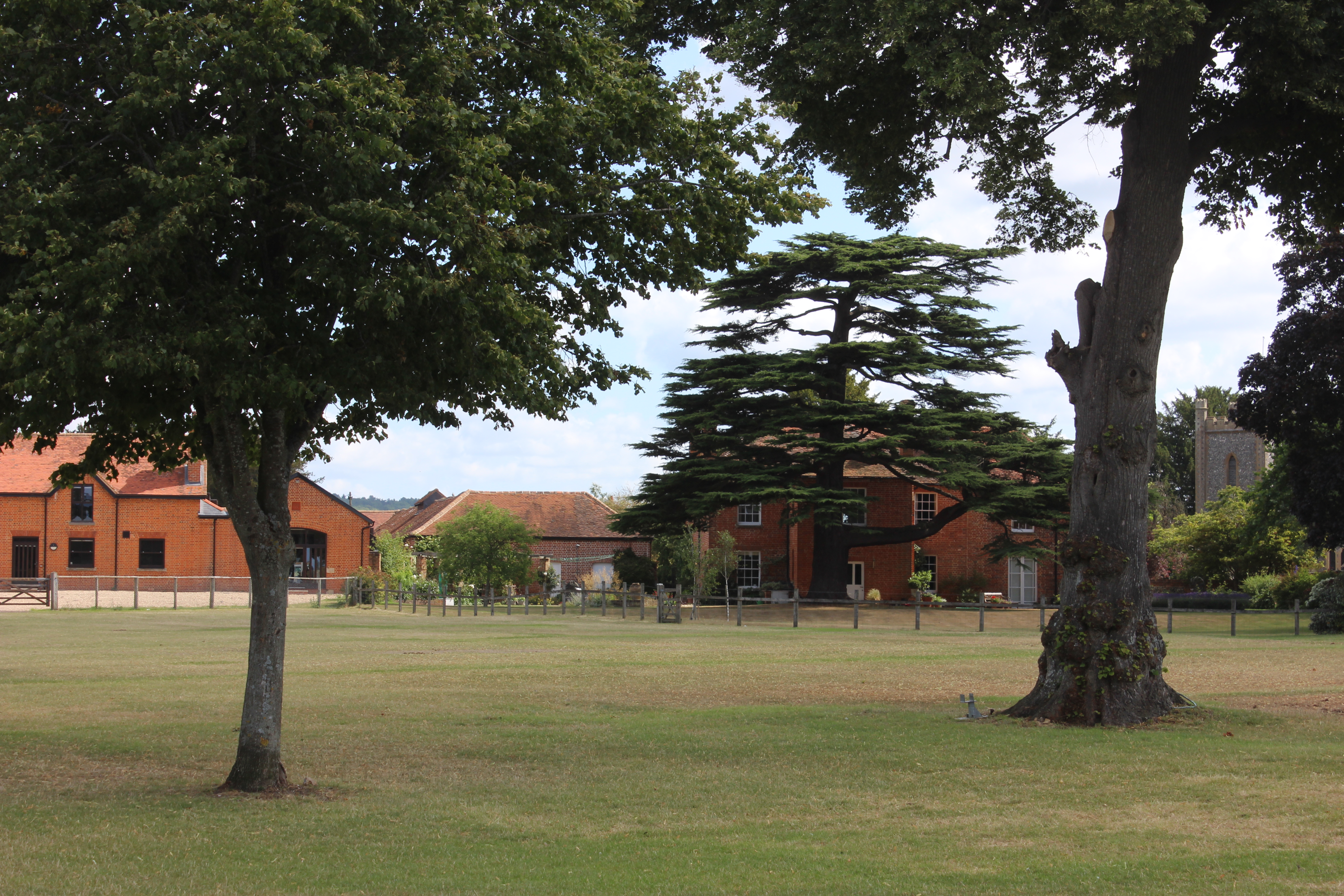
- Remenham village

- Location within Berkshire
- Population: 524 (2011 Census)
- OS grid reference: SU7784
- Civil parish: Remenham
- Unitary authority: Wokingham
- Ceremonial county: Berkshire
- Region: South East
- Country: England
- Sovereign state: United Kingdom
- Post town: Henley-on-Thames
- Postcode district: RG9
- Dialling code: 01491
- Police: Thames Valley
- Fire: Royal Berkshire
- Ambulance: South Central
- UK Parliament: Maidenhead

Remenham is a village and civil parish on the Berkshire bank of the River Thames opposite Henley-on-Thames in southern England. It is particularly well known for its steep approach, known as Remenham Hill or White Hill (due to the chalky nature of the land), into Henley.

Remenham hosts both start and finish points of the Henley Royal Regatta, along with the facilities for rowers and most of the viewing enclosures. Several prestigious rowing clubs occupy bank-side locations within the parish, and the rowing course is closest to the Remenham bank.

== History ==
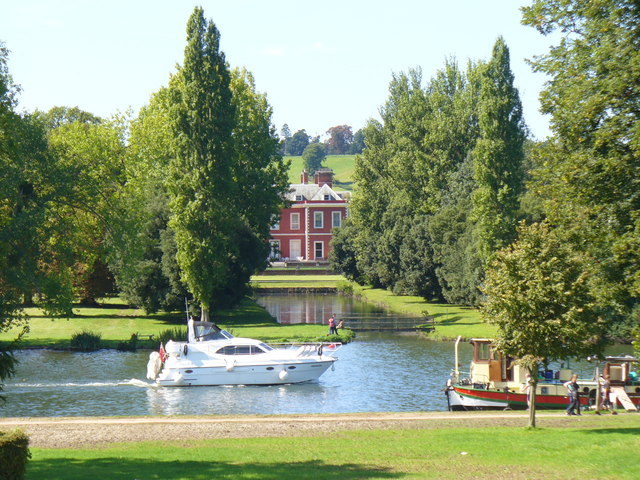
Fawley Court from Remenham

=== Manor ===
The manor mostly had main landowners, some of whom not only held the estate but also lived in it as one of their main residences, including a medieval Earl of Warwick and Duke of Buckingham, passing for many years down the lines of the De Montford family. Indeed, by the time of his fall from grace in 1496, it was Simon de Montford who possessed it. Possibly Simon de Montfort's widow Anne was the Anne Preston who with her husband, John, released the manor in 1503 to Richard, Bishop of Winchester and other trustees for Sir Reynold Bray, who was effectively the absolute purchaser with the monarch's consent. Bray effectively sold or quit in favour of William Norreys whose nephew-in-law, soon to be heir was Sir William Sandys – later created Baron Sandys (de Vyne) who died in 1542.

It remained with the Lords Sandys until 1612–13 when it was conveyed to Sir William Lovelace – later created Lord Lovelace of Hurley. Later heir John Lord Lovelace in 1693 died heavily in debt, and in 1695 Sir Henry Johnson, executor of him and his wife, daughter of Lord Lovelace and administratrix of Anne and Katherine Lovelace her sisters, were paying off debts due on account of the manor to Sir William Whitlock and others. The heirs of Lord Lovelace eventually parted with the manor, which in 1723 was held by Bulstrode Whitlock of Phyllis Court, Henley-on-Thames. Over the course of that and the following year Whitlock passed the manor to Dr Gislingham Cooper. He sold it in about 1760 to the uncle of Strickland Freeman of Fawley Court, lord of the manor in 1813.

His heir was William Peere Williams, Admiral of the Fleet (grandson of Mary Freeman, sister of John Cooke Freeman of Fawley Court), who took the name of Freeman on inheriting Fawley Court. He died in 1832. His grandson and heir William Peere Williams Freeman dealt with the manor in 1833 and sold it to Dudley Coutts Marjoribanks – later a baronet. Sir Dudley Coutts Marjoribanks sold it in 1871 to the Right Hon. William Henry Smith, who in 1891 was succeeded by his son Viscount Hambleden of Greenlands, Hambleden, holding until at least 1923.

=== Strowdes/Vyne Place/Park Place ===
Once a large manor, less significant than the above, its owners have included Lord Archibald Hamilton, son of William 3rd Duke of Hamilton. He built the house standing. About 1738 Lord Archibald sold the estate to Frederick, Prince of Wales, father of George III, who occupied it during his estrangement from his father King George II. In 1752 it was purchased by General (afterwards Field-Marshal) the Hon. Henry Seymour Conway, who started the cultivation of lavender in Remenham and established a distillery. The house, which he had much improved, became the rendezvous of many distinguished people, among whom were Horace Walpole, David Hume, the poet Thomas Gray, and sculptor Anne Seymour Damer, who carved the keystones of Henley Bridge. The grounds were laid out by Conway according to the taste of the period. At the upper end of the Happy Valley in the park was placed a Grecian ruin built of stones brought from Reading Abbey, and stones from the same place were used to build the bridge over the valley which carried the road from Henley to Wargrave. On a hill beyond the pleasure grounds was a Druidic temple presented to Conway by the inhabitants of Jersey (where it was found near St. Helier in 1785), when he was governor of that island.

=== Rectory ===
Before 1709 the gift of the living had been purchased by Jesus College, Oxford, with whom it has since remained, providing a vicar and leaving the legal possibility of chancel repair liability.

=== Other history ===
The parish did away with its common land (and was inclosed) by an Act of Parliament of 1799. In 1923 at Aston there was a ferry over the river Thames, supplementing Henley Bridge built in the 13th century at the upstream end of the parish. At that time notable residents comprised: Wilson Noble of Park Place, a handsome stone mansion, in a free style of French renaissance built by Mr. John Noble, who bought the estate in 1870 on a well-wooded previously occupied site with fine views on the high ground above the river. Other main homes then were Wilminster Park, the residence of Mr. Ernest Eveleigh; Woodlands, the residence of Colonel H. M. Vibart, R.E.; and Bird Place, the residence of Mr. W. A. Simmons, J.P., all situated near the river. Underwood, at Remenham Hill, (on the Oxfordshire bank) was the residence of Mrs. Ames.

== Buildings and monuments ==
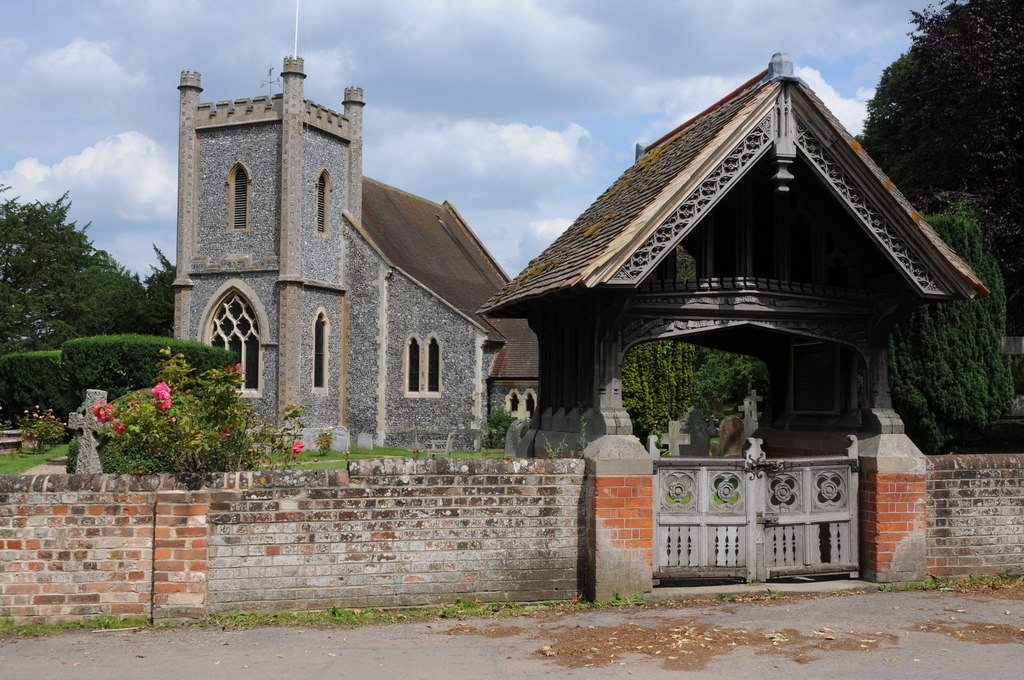
St Nicholas Church, Remenham

The parish church of St Nicholas is Norman in origin, but was rebuilt in 1838 with subsequent renovations. The tower has chequer-work turrets and in the chancel there are some Sienese wrought iron gates. The church is Grade II listed. A field on the Park Place estate has a large obelisk which was originally the spire of St Bride's Church in the City of London.

== Events ==
The parish covers the starting point of the Henley Royal Regatta course. Remenham Club and Upper Thames Rowing Clubs are private members club for rowers, with a good view of the river Thames halfway along the Henley course. Leander Club, founded in 1818, is one of the oldest rowing clubs in the world. Remenham is host to many successful rowing regattas including Henley Women's Regatta, Henley Masters Regatta and, until 2017, Henley Boat Races.

Temple Island Meadows events venue is home to Rewind Festival, the Henley Swim and Open Water Swimming events.

== Localities ==
=== Aston ===
Aston is a hamlet set back by one short access lane from the Thames further to the east of Henley than Remenham village centre, both offset to the north. Less than 1 mile (1.6 km) separates the two, however this is a green buffer that is farmed. No properties front the river here which is left as natural flood plain grazing land and the hamlet has only one listed building, Aston Farmhouse, at Grade II. It is on the Aston and Remenham Circular Walk.

=== Culham ===
Culham is a hamlet of six properties and outbuildings set back from the Thames immediately east of Aston, half of which can be accessed via a track from Aston. Four of the buildings are listed buildings, with Culham Court having the finest architecture, at Grade II*. The others in the lowest category (Grade II) are related but now separate, the Former Kitchen Garden Walls, the stables and coachhouse and the Bothy ('at Culham Court'). Culham House, Culham Court Lodge and the Lower Culham, Middle Culham and Upper Culham farms are groups of buildings located in the small valley leading away from the river to the east of Remenham Hill.

== See also ==
- Temple Island
- Sir Miles Thomas, Baron Thomas of Remenham
