= Temple Island =

Island in the River Thames, England

Coordinates: 51.55682°N 0.88928°W

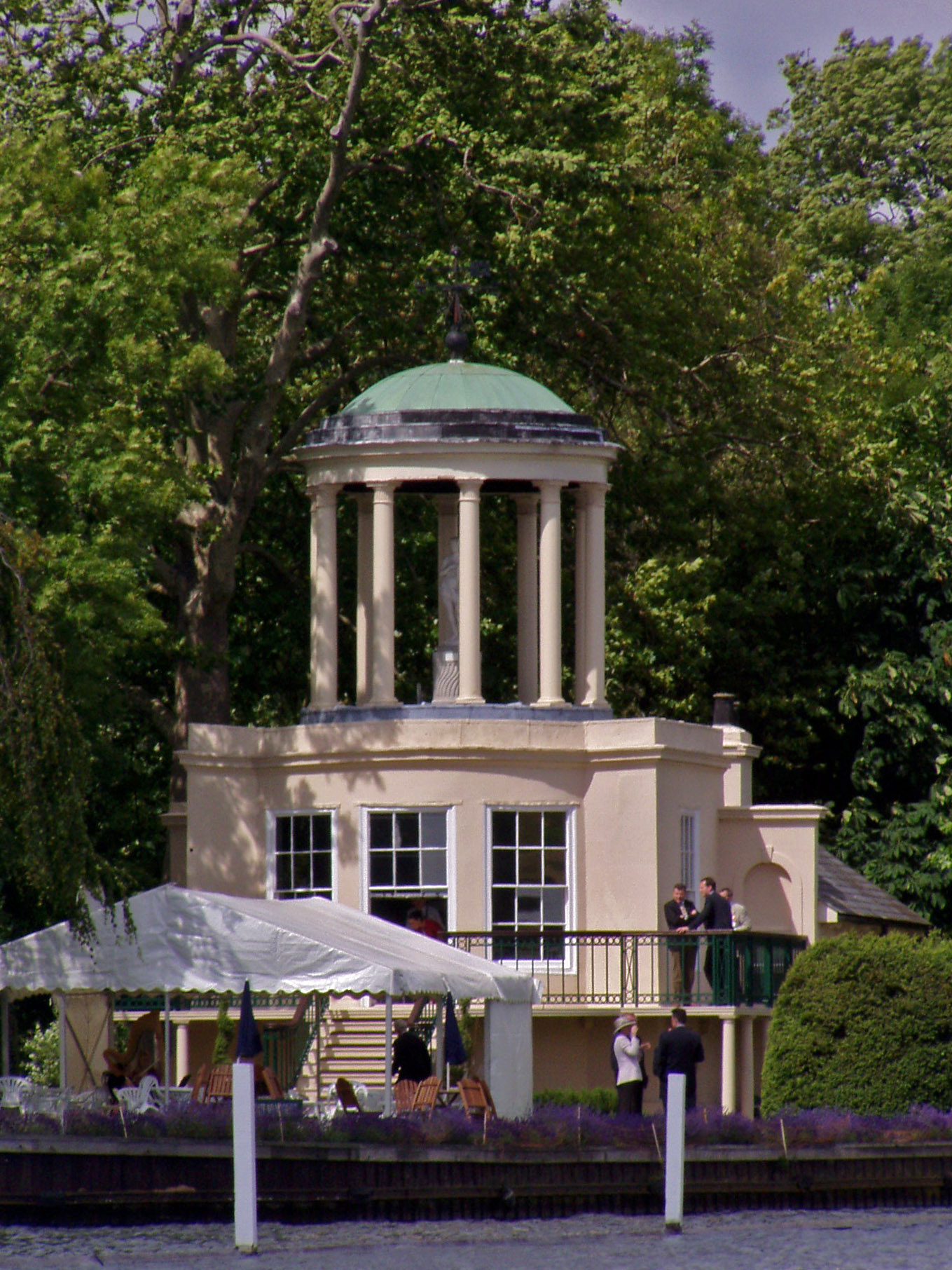
The folly on Temple Island

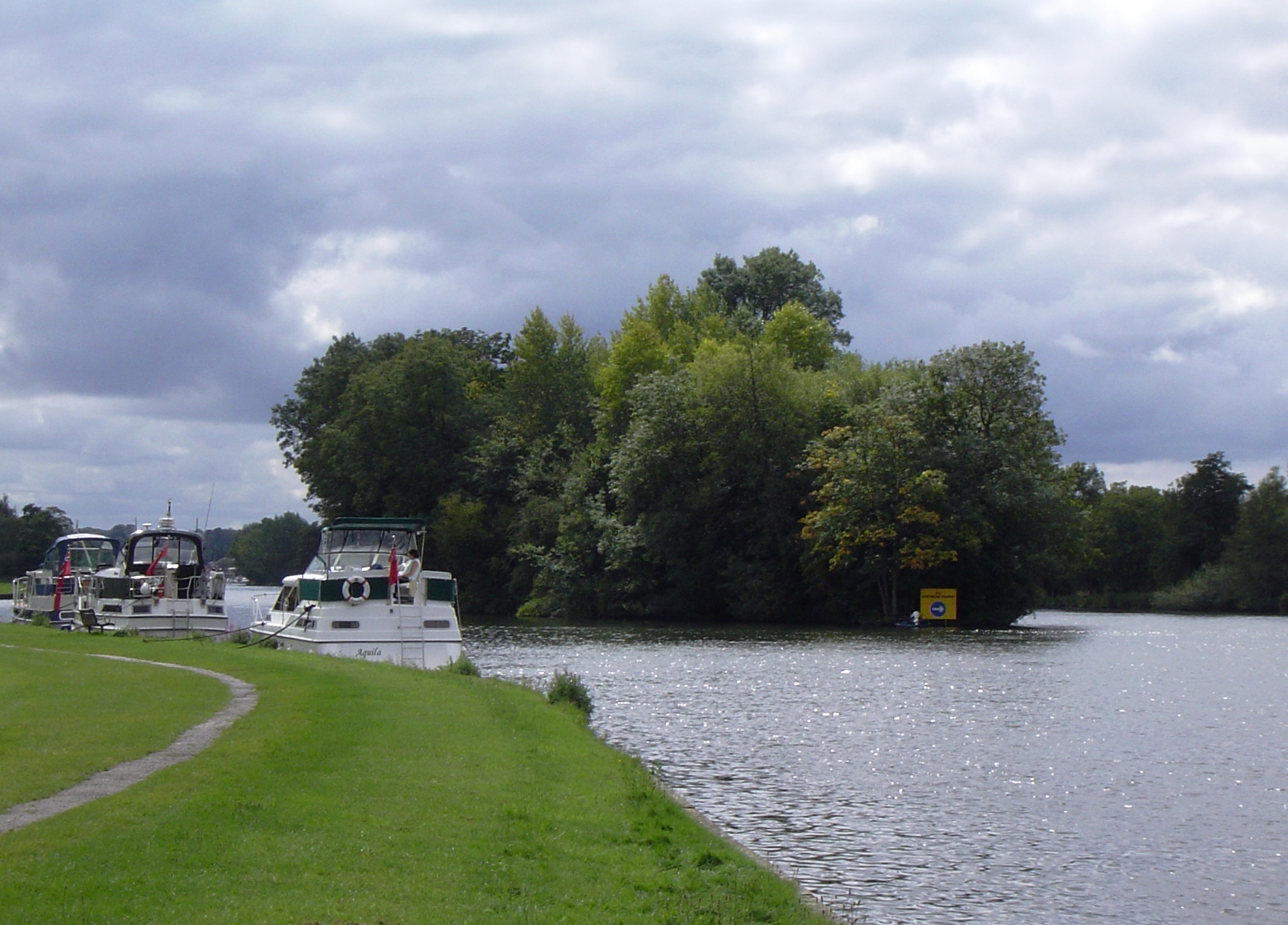
Temple Island from the downstream side

Temple Island is an eyot in the River Thames in England just north (downstream) of Henley-on-Thames, Oxfordshire. The island is on the reach above Hambleden Lock between the Buckinghamshire and Berkshire banks, and is part of Remenham in Berkshire. The main significance of the island is that it lies at the start of the course for Henley Royal Regatta.

The island includes a folly in the form of an elegant ornamental temple, originally intended as a fishing lodge for Fawley Court, on the Buckinghamshire bank of the river. The temple is now a grade II listed building.

== History ==
The temple on the island was designed by the 18th century English architect James Wyatt and constructed in 1771. It was designed as a fishing lodge for Fawley Court, a nearby historic house that Wyatt also remodelled in the 1770s on the commission of its owner, Sambrooke Freeman. Wyatt designed both the structure of the building and its interior decoration; it is likely that he also provided designs for the original furniture. The wall paintings in the principal room are thought to be the earliest surviving example of the Etruscan style in Great Britain, predating more famous examples such as the Etruscan Dressing Room at Osterley Park by Robert Adam.

In the 19th century, the island's ownership passed, with Fawley Court, from the Freeman family to the Mackenzie family. In 1952, upon the death of Roderick Mackenzie, Henley Royal Regatta asked his daughter Margaret for 'first refusal' should she ever decide to sell the island. It is not clear whether an understanding was reached. By the early 1980s, the advent of corporate entertaining greatly increased the potential value of the island. In 1983 the Stewards of the Regatta again began making overtures to Margaret Mackenzie but in 1986 the island was placed on the open market.

Supported by a gift of £515,000 from Alan Burrough (a Steward of the Regatta) and his wife Rosie, in December 1987 the Regatta was able to purchase a 999-year lease of the island and the temple. Following the purchase, the Stewards of the Regatta undertook restoration works to the island and the temple. The downstream portion of the island was retained as a nature reserve and was extensively replanted with trees.

The Victorian balcony which had decayed was replaced. The wall paintings, which had deteriorated and had been badly over-painted, were repaired and brought back to the colours originally intended by Wyatt. A statue of a nymph, in keeping with the style and age of the Temple, was placed under the cupola.

== Use of the island ==
The location was featured in the music video of "Never Turn Away" by Orchestral Manoeuvres in the Dark.

In an effort to prevent damage to the Temple or to its garden, visitors are barred from mooring or setting foot on the island without written permission from the Henley Royal Regatta Committee.

== Other Temple Islands ==
There is another island also named Temple Island off the east coast of the Australian state of Queensland.

== See also ==
- Islands in the River Thames

Next island upstream	River Thames	Next island downstream
Rod Eyot	Temple Island	Magpie Island
