= Stany Van Wymeersch =

Belgian Flemish writer, and journalist (born 1965)

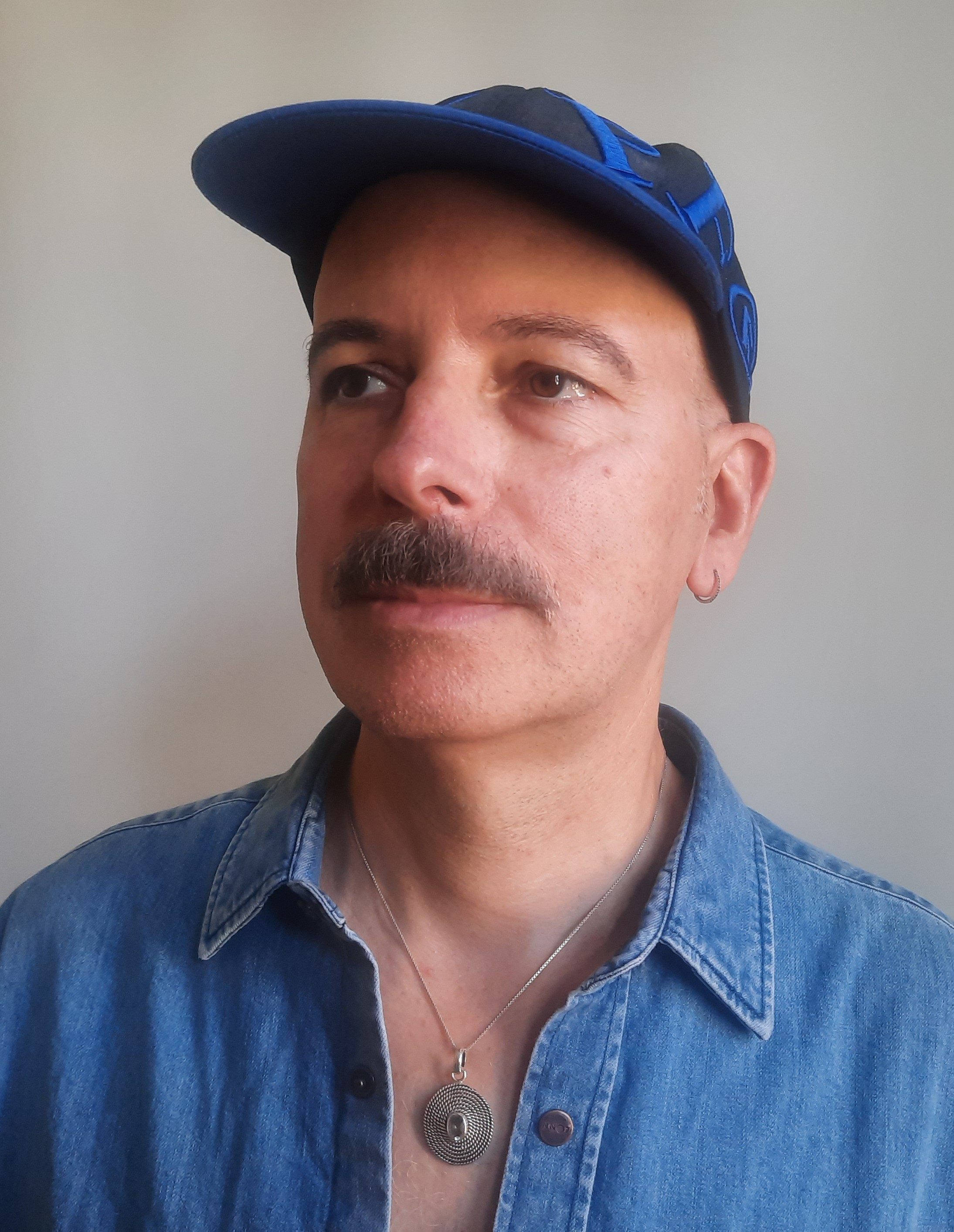
- Born: Stany Van Wijmeersch; 20 September 1965 (age 61); Ghent, East Flanders
- Occupations: lawyer, author
- Writing career
- Genre: Interviews about ABBA
- Notable works: Let's talk about ABBA; We all love ABBA; Legacy I Legacy II; We all love ABBA - expanded edition
- Website: www.stanyvanwymeersch.com

Stany Van Wymeersch or Van Wijmeersch (born 20 September 1965) is a Belgian published author and music journalist, best known for his work on the pop group ABBA.

== Career ==
Van Wymeersch was born in Ghent and attended secondary school at the Royal Atheneum in his hometown and then studied law at the Ghent University from 1983 to 1989. For most of his career, he was active in the communications and cultural sector.

As a free-lance journalist, he contributed to (among others) Primo Magazine (Belgium), De Telegraaf (Netherlands), De Morgen (Belgium), ABBA Intermezzo Magazine (Germany) and the Official International ABBA Fan Club Magazine (Netherlands).

Van Wymeersch was also a consultant for the official ABBA exhibition Super Troupers at The O2 in London, which ran from December 2019 until March 2020, and sat for Eurostory.nl on the jury for the Best Lyrics Award at the Eurovision Song Contest 2019, 2021 and 2023.

November 2020 saw the release of Bonnie and José - Herinnering (Memory) on CD/DVD. The CD booklet includes a new interview with Bonnie & José by Van Wymeersch.

In April 2025, Van Wymeersch released a spoken-word retro pop version of the ABBA song "Crazy World" with the band S-O-K, consisting of himself, Ophelia Van Wymeersch and Klaas Tomme. The track featured guest appearances by Swedish guitarist Janne Schaffer and vocalist Susie Webb. It premiered on 12 April during the official ABBA Fan Club Day in Roosendaal and was simultaneously released on major digital platforms such as Spotify and YouTube, A limited-edition vinyl single (500 copies) was also released, featuring cover art by photographer Govert de Roos.

To mark the 50th anniversary of the release of ABBA’s single "Dancing Queen", the Ghent-based band S-O-K, founded by Stany Van Wymeersch but this time with Klaas Tomme on lead vocals, released a new version of the ABBA classic on Spotify and all digital streaming platforms in August 2026. It was an intimate, acoustic version, without any disco sounds, in which the melody and vocals take centre stage.

== Book launches ==
His first book Let's Talk About ABBA consisted of interviews with collaborators and musicians from ABBA's entourage, original quotes from the ABBA members and an interview with Björn Ulvaeus. ABBA's art director Rune Söderqvist was the artistic advisor of this book, which was published by Dragonetti, a subsidiary of Ballon Media. The book was released in English and translated to Dutch.

Stany's second book We All Love ABBA, on the theme of ABBA's influence on a wide variety of artists and bands such as Luv', Erasure, Boney M., Smokie (band), the Sex Pistols and Queen.

In October 2021, the books The Legacy of ABBA - Vol.1 and Vol.2 were released. The Legacy of ABBA Vol.1 contains a complete overview of the ABBA members' careers, as well as exclusive and extensive interviews with Anni-Frid Lyngstad, Björn Ulvaeus and Benny Andersson.The Legacy of ABBA Vol.2 focuses on important photographers who have worked with ABBA (including Anders Hanser and Bubi Heilemann), ABBA music in films and famous ABBA fans.

The official book launch took place in Slottsholmen, Västervik in Sweden, at the hotel of Björn Ulvaeus and his daughter Anna. Special guests were Tonny Roth (Hootenanny Singers), Anders Hanser (ABBA's official photographer), Hans Löfvenberg (ABBA tour management), Marga Scheide (Luv') and Michiel Gunning (Popfoto journalist/photo model).

The books were also presented in Ghent (B) at AtelierGent74, in the presence of Marga Scheide, Michiel Gunning, Getty Kaspers (Teach-In), Philippe Elan and Maarten Vande Wiele.

Both books reached first place on Amazon's bestseller lists in Australia, Sweden, UK, Poland and France. In Germany and Spain, the books reached the Top 5 and in Italy and the United States the Top 20.

An Estonian version of the book Let's Talk About ABBA was released in 2022. The book was expanded and adapted for audiences in Estonia, including a new interview with rising star Stefan Airapetjan, who represented Estonia at the Eurovision Song Contest 2022 in Turin.

In October 2023, the book We All Love ABBA - Expanded Edition was released, with new contributions and photos (48 extra pages). The book was presented at an event in Ghent with Maggie MacNeal, Philippe Elan, Marga Scheide (Luv'), Govert de Roos, Dick Kooiman and Embracingfranki as special guests.

== Bibliography ==
- Lets Talk About ABBA: English and Dutch version - Ballon Media (2013)
- We All Love ABBA: English version - SVW Books (2016)
- The Legacy of ABBA Volume 1 & 2: English version - SVW Books (2021)
- ABBA. Austusavaldus ülimale popbändile: Estonian version of Let's Talk About ABBA - Pegasus, Estonia (2022)
- We All Love ABBA - Expanded Edition: English version - SVW Books (2023)
