= Temple Island Meadows =

Protected area in Buckinghamshire, England

Coordinates: 51.556°N 0.8922°W

- Site of Special Scientific Interest
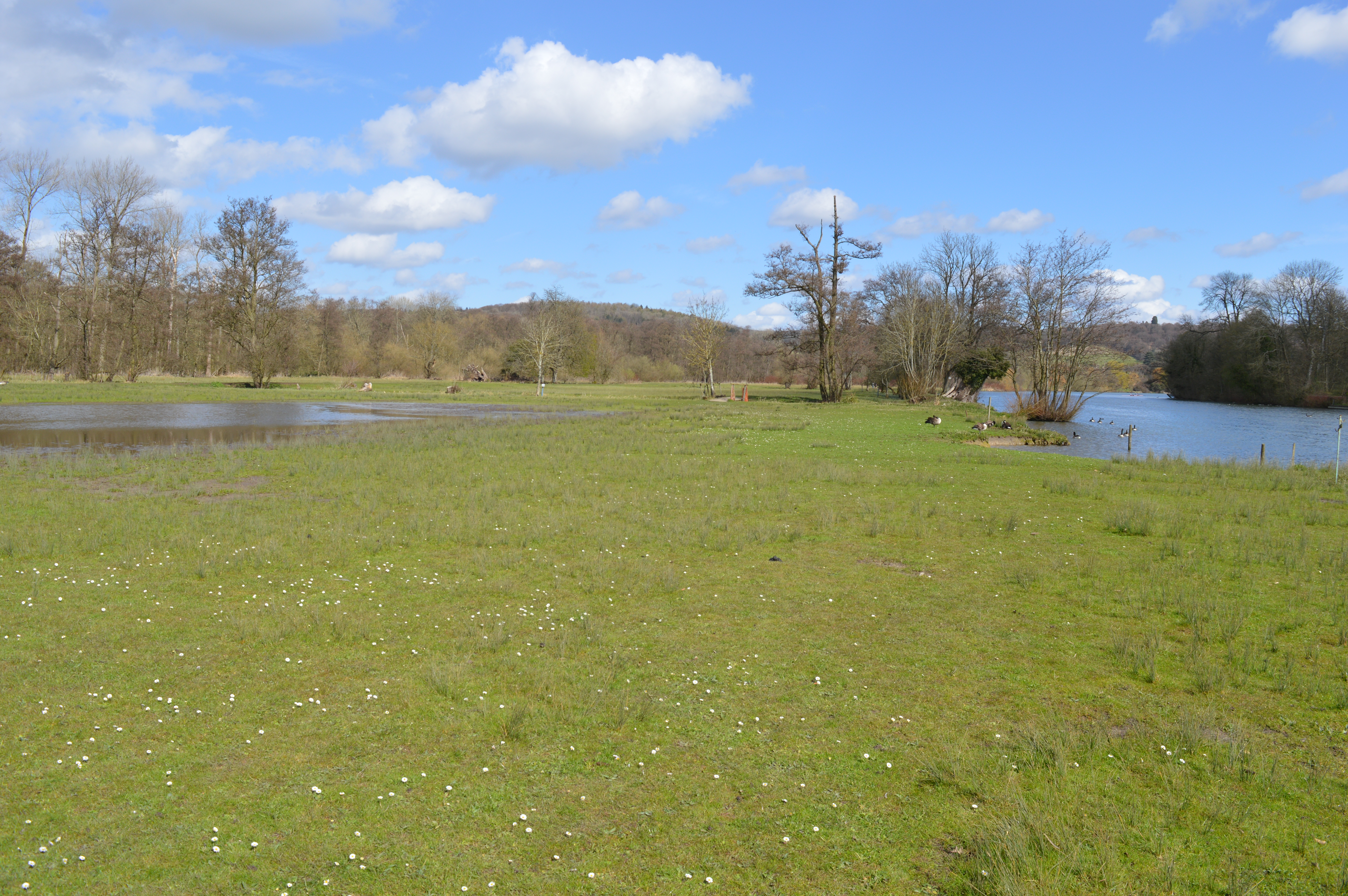
- Location of Temple Island Meadows.
- Area of search: Buckinghamshire
- Grid reference: SU769847
- Interest: Biological
- Area: 14.1 ha (35 acres)
- Notification date: 1989
- Location map: Magic Map

Temple Island Meadows is a 14.1-hectare (35-acre) biological Site of Special Scientific Interest on the Buckinghamshire bank of the River Thames. It is north of Henley-on-Thames and opposite Temple Island, an island in the Thames.

The site is composed of several wet meadows, which are grazed by sheep. They are seasonally flooded and waterlogged and have a diverse flora and fauna. Plants include the nationally rare summer snowflake and marsh and early marsh orchids, which are found in locations with a long history of undisturbed grassland management. There are invertebrates such as the endangered marsh fly Dicheptophora findlandica and the rare dragonfly Gomphus vulgatissimus. There are also areas of wet woodland, and the diverse habitats attract a variety of breeding birds.

A riverside footpath crosses the site.
