= Ultimate Collector's Edition =

2016 box set by the band U.K.

Ultimate Collectors' Edition

Box set by U.K.
- Released: 4 November 2016
- Recorded: 1978, 1979, 2011
- Genre: Progressive rock, jazz fusion
- Length: 16:38:57
- Label: Globe Music
- Producer: U.K., Eddie Jobson

U.K. chronology
Curtain Call (2015)	Ultimate Collectors' Edition (2016)

Ultimate Collectors' Edition is a compilation box set by the band U.K., released on 4 November 2016. The set includes 14 CDs, 4 Blu-rays and a 66-page book detailing the band's history. The CDs include: remastered versions of the band's two studio albums (U.K. and Danger Money), each with an extra disc containing songs in pre-production form; an extended, 2-CD version of the Night After Night live album featuring a complete show, and a remaster of the original version; a remixed version of Reunion – Live in Tokyo, three concerts from 1978 (In Boston, Philadelphia and Cleveland), two bonus discs with interviews with John Wetton and Eddie Jobson, and the band's final concert from 1979 (In the Netherlands).

The four Blu-ray discs present the albums U.K., Danger Money, the extended Night After Night and Reunion.

== Contents ==
All the songs on each of the albums included are written by Eddie Jobson and John Wetton, except where noted.

=== CDs ===
==== U.K. (2016 remaster) ====
No.	Title	Writer(s)	Length
1.	"In The Dead Of Night"		5:34
2.	"By The Light Of Day"		4:32
3.	"Presto Vivace and Reprise"		3:07
4.	"Thirty Years"	Jobson, Wetton, Bill Bruford	8:05
5.	"Alaska"	Jobson	4:41
6.	"Time To Kill"	Jobson, Wetton, Bruford	4:58
7.	"Nevermore"	Jobson, Wetton, Allan Holdsworth	8:14
8.	"Mental Medication"	Jobson, Bruford, Holdsworth	7:24
Total length:			46:35

==== U.K. Extras ====
No.	Title	Writer(s)	Length
1.	"In The Dead Of Night"		5:32
2.	"By The Light Of Day"		4:50
3.	"Presto Vivace and Reprise"		2:59
4.	"Thirty Years"	Jobson, Wetton, Bruford	6:39
5.	"Alaska"	Jobson	4:49
6.	"Time To Kill"	Jobson, Wetton, Bruford	4:58
7.	"Nevermore"	Jobson, Wetton, Holdsworth	8:04
8.	"Mental Medication"	Jobson, Bruford, Holdsworth	7:33
Total length:			45:24

- The band recording the tracks for the "U.K." album. Pre-vocal; guide keyboards; first solos; pre-overdubs; pre-mix.

==== Live in Boston ====
No.	Title	Writer(s)	Length
1.	"Alaska"	Jobson	3:41
2.	"Time To Kill"	Jobson, Wetton, Bruford	5:09
3.	"The Only Thing She Needs"		7:21
4.	"Carrying No Cross"		10:01
5.	"Thirty Years"	Jobson, Wetton, Bruford	8:40
6.	"By The Light Of Day - Part 2"	Jobson	1:21
7.	"Presto Vivace"	Jobson	1:17
8.	"In The Dead Of Night"		6:33
9.	"Caesar's Palace Blues"		4:29
Total length:			48:32

- Recorded live at The Paradise Theater, Boston, 11 July 1978. This concert had previously been released in 1999 as "Concert Classics, Vol. 4" without the approval of the band.

==== Live in Philadelphia ====
No.	Title	Writer(s)	Length
1.	"Alaska"	Jobson	3:39
2.	"Time To Kill"	Jobson, Wetton, Bruford	5:23
3.	"The Only Thing She Needs"		7:21
4.	"Carrying No Cross"		10:04
5.	"Forever Until Sunday"	Bruford	6:02
6.	"Thirty Years"	Jobson, Wetton, Bruford	8:08
7.	"By The Light Of Day - Part 2"	Jobson	1:14
8.	"Presto Vivace"	Jobson	1:23
9.	"In The Dead Of Night"		7:31
10.	"The Sahara Of Snow"	Bruford, Jobson	9:39
11.	"Caesar's Palace Blues"		5:14
Total length:			65:38

- Recorded live at The Penn's Landing, Philadelphia, 8 August 1978.

==== Live in Cleveland ====
No.	Title	Writer(s)	Length
1.	"Alaska"	Jobson	4:13
2.	"Time To Kill"	Jobson, Wetton, Bruford	5:44
3.	"The Only Thing She Needs"		7:30
4.	"Carrying No Cross"		10:24
5.	"Forever Until Sunday"	Bruford	5:36
6.	"Thirty Years"	Jobson, Wetton, Bruford	8:31
7.	"By The Light Of Day - Part 2"	Jobson	1:28
8.	"Presto Vivace"	Jobson	1:21
9.	"In The Dead Of Night"		7:08
Total length:			51:55

- Recorded live at The Agora Ballroom, Cleveland, 18 September 1978.

==== Danger Money (2016 remaster) ====
No.	Title	Length
1.	"Danger Money"	8:16
2.	"Rendezvous 6:02"	5:01
3.	"The Only Thing She Needs"	7:53
4.	"Caesar's Palace Blues"	4:55
5.	"Nothing To Lose"	3:55
6.	"Carrying No Cross"	12:24
Total length:		42:14

==== Danger Money Extras ====
No.	Title	Writer(s)	Length
1.	"Danger Money (recording drums)"		8:06
2.	"Carrying No Cross (recording drums)"		8:04
3.	"When Will You Realize?"	Wetton	3:25
Total length:			19:35

- "When Will You Realize?" was the single B-side of "Night After Night".

==== Night After Night (extended version) ====
Disc 1
No.	Title	Writer(s)	Length
1.	"Night After Night"		5:09
2.	"Danger Money"		8:08
3.	"The Only Thing She Needs"		9:14
4.	"Nothing To Lose"		5:12
5.	"Bass Solo"	Wetton	5:15
6.	"Thirty Years"	Jobson, Wetton, Bruford	6:16
7.	"Carrying No Cross"		13:27
8.	"Rendezvous 6:02"		5:32
9.	"As Long As You Want Me Here"		5:02
Total length:			63:15

Disc 2
No.	Title	Writer(s)	Length
1.	"Alaska"	Jobson	4:18
2.	"Time To Kill"	Jobson, Wetton, Bruford	4:20
3.	"Violin Solo"	Jobson	4:32
4.	"Time To Kill - Reprise"	Jobson, Wetton, Bruford	2:21
5.	"By The Light Of Day - Part II"	Jobson	1:36
6.	"Presto Vivace"	Jobson	1:05
7.	"Drum Solo"	Terry Bozzio	3:45
8.	"In The Dead Of Night"		6:22
9.	"Caesar's Palace Blues"		5:02
Total length:			33:21

- Remixed from the original multitrack master tapes.

==== Night After Night (original version) ====
No.	Title	Writer(s)	Length
1.	"Night After Night"		5:22
2.	"Rendezvous 6:02"		5:17
3.	"Nothing To Lose"		5:26
4.	"As Long As You Want Me Here"		5:01
5.	"Alaska"	Jobson	4:19
6.	"Time To Kill"	Jobson, Wetton, Bruford	4:18
7.	"Presto Vivace"	Jobson	1:03
8.	"In The Dead Of Night"		6:22
9.	"Caesar's Palace Blues"		5:04
Total length:			42:12

==== Reunion (2016 remix) ====
Disc 1
No.	Title	Writer(s)	Length
1.	"In The Dead Of Night"		7:34
2.	"By The Light Of Day"		4:47
3.	"Presto Vivace and Reprise"		2:49
4.	"Danger Money"		9:02
5.	"Thirty Years"	Jobson, Wetton, Bruford	8:28
6.	"Alaska"	Jobson	5:01
7.	"Time To Kill"	Jobson, Wetton, Bruford	5:03
8.	"Starless"	David Cross, Robert Fripp, Wetton, Bruford, Richard Palmer-James	11:45
9.	"Carrying No Cross"		12:05
Total length:			66:35

Disc 2
No.	Title	Writer(s)	Length
1.	"Violin Solo"	Jobson	6:20
2.	"Nevermore"	Jobson, Wetton, Holdsworth	8:16
3.	"One More Red Nightmare"	Fripp, Wetton	6:18
4.	"Caesar's Palace Blues"		4:51
5.	"The Only Thing She Needs"		8:50
6.	"Rendezvous 6:02"		5:41
Total length:			40:17

==== Interviews ====
No.	Title	Length
1.	"Jobson-Wetton Interview - New York 1978"	41:49
2.	"Jobson-Wetton Interview - London 1979"	28:28
Total length:		70:17

==== 1979 Final Concert ====
No.	Title	Writer(s)	Length
1.	"Danger Money"		7:50
2.	"As Long As You Want Me Here"		5:01
3.	"Thirty Years"	Jobson, Wetton, Bruford	7:05
4.	"Drum Solo"	Bozzio	6:01
5.	"Night After Night"		4:39
6.	"Alaska"	Jobson	4:38
7.	"Nothing To Lose"		5:07
8.	"Bass Solo"	Wetton	6:03
9.	"Rendezvous 6:02"		5:22
10.	"Nostalgia"	Jobson	4:20
11.	"Violin Solo"	Jobson	7:17
12.	"Presto Vivace"	Jobson	1:17
13.	"In The Dead Of Night"		6:36
Total length:			71:16

- Recorded live at Concertgebouw de Vereeniging, Nijmegen, 17 December 1979.

=== Blu-rays ===
==== U.K. ====
No.	Title	Writer(s)	Length
1.	"In The Dead Of Night"		5:31
2.	"By The Light Of Day"		4:33
3.	"Presto Vivace and Reprise"		3:09
4.	"Thirty Years"	Jobson, Wetton, Bruford	8:03
5.	"Alaska"	Jobson	4:40
6.	"Time To Kill"	Jobson, Wetton, Bruford	4:57
7.	"Nevermore"	Jobson, Wetton, Holdsworth	8:13
8.	"Mental Medication"	Jobson, Bruford, Holdsworth	7:25
Total length:			46:31

- High fidelity 24-bit/96k.

==== Danger Money ====
No.	Title	Length
1.	"Danger Money"	8:16
2.	"Rendezvous 6:02"	5:00
3.	"The Only Thing She Needs"	7:53
4.	"Caesar's Palace Blues"	4:44
5.	"Nothing To Lose"	3:55
6.	"Carrying No Cross"	12:23
Total length:		42:11

- High fidelity 24-bit/96k.

==== Night After Night (extended version) ====
No.	Title	Writer(s)	Length
1.	"Night After Night"		5:09
2.	"Danger Money"		8:08
3.	"The Only Thing She Needs"		9:13
4.	"Nothing To Lose"		5:12
5.	"Bass Solo"	Wetton	5:11
6.	"Thirty Years"	Jobson, Wetton, Bruford	6:18
7.	"Carrying No Cross"		13:27
8.	"Rendezvous 6:02"		5:32
9.	"As Long As You Want Me Here"		5:05
10.	"Alaska"	Jobson	4:18
11.	"Time To Kill"	Jobson, Wetton, Bruford	4:20
12.	"Violin Solo"	Jobson	4:31
13.	"Time To Kill - Reprise"	Jobson, Wetton, Bruford	2:20
14.	"By The Light Of Day - Part II"	Jobson	1:34
15.	"Presto Vivace"	Jobson	1:06
16.	"Drum Solo"	Bozzio	3:45
17.	"In The Dead Of Night"		6:21
18.	"Caesar's Palace Blues"		5:03
Total length:			96:33

- High fidelity 24-bit/96k. 2.0 Stereo and 5.1 Surround.

==== Reunion ====
No.	Title	Writer(s)	Length
1.	"In The Dead Of Night"		7:34
2.	"By The Light Of Day"		4:46
3.	"Presto Vivace and Reprise"		2:49
4.	"Danger Money"		9:01
5.	"Thirty Years"	Jobson, Wetton, Bruford	8:30
6.	"Alaska"	Jobson	5:00
7.	"Time To Kill"	Jobson, Wetton, Bruford	5:03
8.	"Starless"	Cross, Fripp, Wetton, Bruford, Palmer-James	11:45
9.	"Carrying No Cross"		12:10
10.	"Violin Solo"	Jobson	6:06
11.	"Nevermore"	Jobson, Wetton, Holdsworth	8:15
12.	"One More Red Nightmare"	Fripp, Wetton	6:17
13.	"Caesar's Palace Blues"		4:51
14.	"The Only Thing She Needs"		8:50
15.	"Rendezvous 6:02"		5:41
Total length:			106:38

- High fidelity 24-bit/96k. Remixed from digital multitrack. Stereo. The Blu-ray does not contain the video of the performance.

== Personnel ==
- Eddie Jobson – keyboards, backing vocals, violin
- John Wetton – bass, lead vocals
- Allan Holdsworth – guitar (Disc 1-5, Blu-ray 1)
- Bill Bruford – drums, percussion (Disc 1-5, Blu-ray 1)
- Terry Bozzio – drums, percussion (Disc 6-9, 12, Blu-ray 2-3)
- Alex Machacek – guitar (Disc 10, Blu-ray 4)
- Marco Minnemann – drums, percussion (Disc 10, Blu-ray 4)
