= UKZ =

Progressive rock band

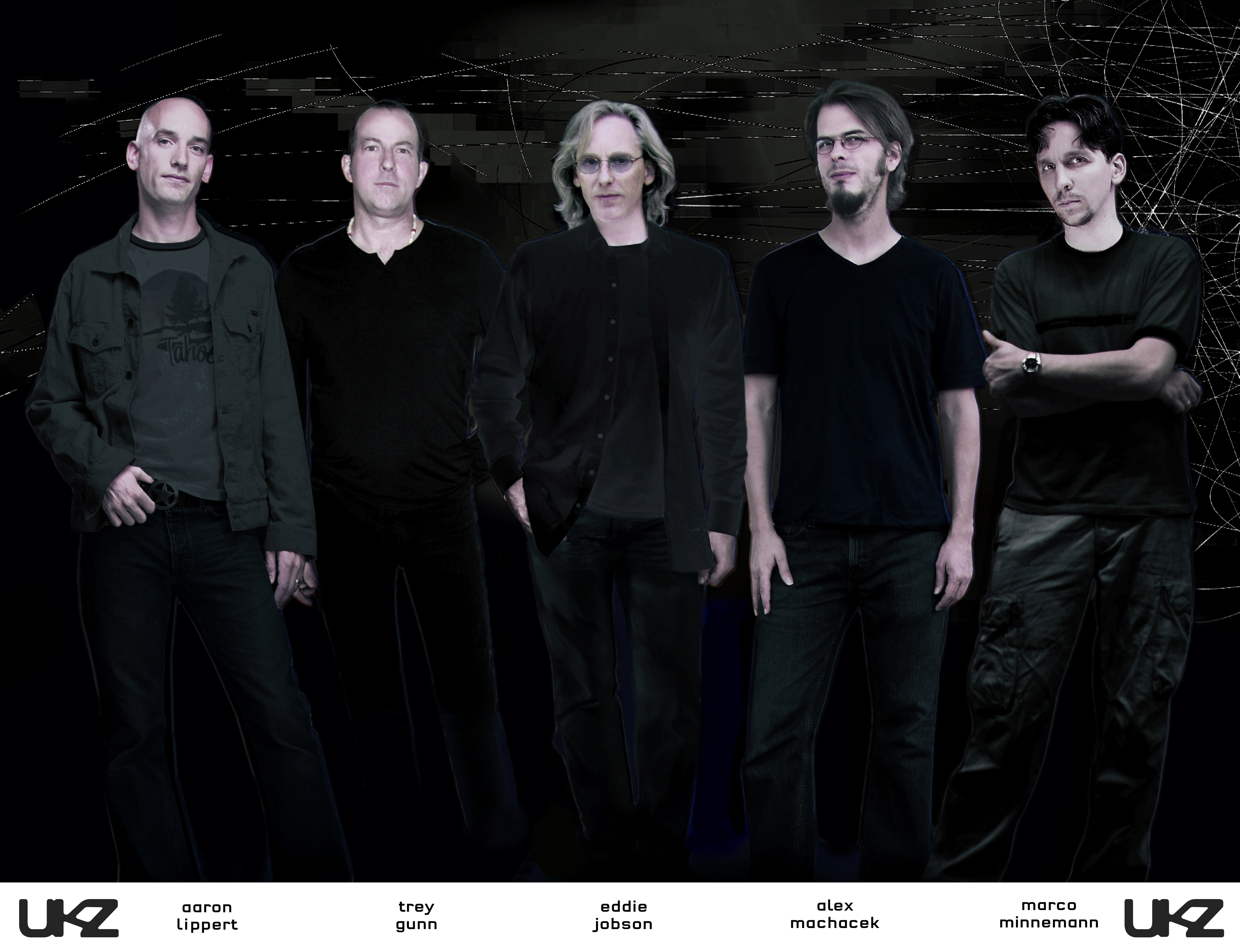

Background information
- Genres: Progressive rock, Progressive metal
- Years active: 2007–2009, 2013
- Labels: Globe Music & Media Arts
- Members: Eddie Jobson; Trey Gunn; Alex Machacek; Marco Minnemann; Aaron Lippert
- Website: Official UKZ website

UKZ is an international progressive rock band, that was formed in 2007 by keyboardist/violinist Eddie Jobson, who had played in UK.

== History ==
=== Formation ===
After a failed attempt to work on a proposed U.K. reunion album with John Wetton, in October 2007 Eddie Jobson announced a new band, UKZ, with Aaron Lippert, former vocalist for Expanding Man who had also worked with Jobson in the 1990s, Trey Gunn from King Crimson on Warr guitar, guitarist Alex Machacek and drummer Marco Minnemann.

According to Jobson, the idea of UKZ was to form a players band with a contemporary flavor to it. The project ended up becoming international, as each of the players were situated in different parts of the world and recorded their first EP "Radiation" without meeting in person.

Although many thought the UKZ name referenced UK and Zinc, the band Jobson recorded his The Green Album with in 1983, Jobson has maintained that since the original name proposed to the project, UK3, linked too much to UK and that John Wetton would have objected with him using the UK name alone, he decided that UKZ sounded more generic and more modern.

=== EP release and live activity ===
After releasing an instrumental MP3 track, entitled "Tu-95" (after the Soviet airplane), for download on 30 September 2008 and a videoclip of the song "Radiation", UKZ played their debut concert in New York City's Town Hall in January 2009. The band's first EP "Radiation" was then released in March 2009 via Ryko Distribution. In July of the same year UKZ toured Japan, playing in Tokyo, Nagoya and Osaka.

Later that year John Wetton joined Eddie Jobson on stage for the first time in 30 years during three shows of Jobson's Ultimate Zero (U-Z) project in Poland and a selection of these performances appeared in November 2010 on the album Ultimate Zero Tour - Live. A UK reunion was officialized in 2011 and Jobson and Wetton toured together until 2016, under various line-ups that sometimes included UKZ members Machacek and Minnemann. As a result, the UKZ project took a temporary step back.

In November 2013, Lippert, Machacek and Minneman joined Jobson on stage for his brief Four Decades tour in Japan, to play three of the four songs contained in the "Radiation" EP. A performance recorded in Kawasaki was released in 2015 as part of the album and video "Four Decades".

== Discography ==
=== Extended plays ===
- Radiation (2009)
