= Curtain Call (UK album) =

Live album by U.K.
- Released: 2015
- Recorded: 8 November 2013
- Venue: Club Città, Kawasaki, Japan
- Genre: Progressive rock
- Label: Ward Records
- Producer: Eddie Jobson

U.K. chronology
Reunion – Live in Tokyo (2013)	Curtain Call (2015)	Ultimate Collector's Edition (2016)

Curtain Call is a live album by U.K. recorded during one single night in Kawasaki, Japan. Originally available only in Japan, it was released globally in 2023. The album was released in 2015 to coincide to the final concerts by the band, hence the title. The track list consists of complete live performances of the two studio albums by the band, U.K. and Danger Money, plus the two non-studio tracks present on the live album Night After Night. The line-up is the same as their previous live album Reunion – Live in Tokyo.

The set list also includes "Waiting for You", a previously unreleased song that was performed live during U.K.'s last 1979 tour and that was intended to be on the band's never-recorded third studio album. The song "Mental Medication", from U.K.'s first album, was never performed live before this special event.

The album was released as a double CD, DVD and Blu-ray and in a special package together with Eddie Jobson's Four Decades.

== Track listing ==
All songs written by Eddie Jobson and John Wetton except as noted.

Disc 1
No.	Title	Writer(s)	Length
1.	"In The Dead Of Night"		6:05
2.	"By The Light Of Day"		4:46
3.	"Presto Vivace and Reprise"		2:48
4.	"Thirty Years"	Jobson, Wetton, Bill Bruford	8:40
5.	"Alaska"	Jobson	4:45
6.	"Time To Kill"	Jobson, Wetton, Bruford	5:04
7.	"Nevermore"	Jobson, Wetton, Allan Holdsworth	8:36
8.	"Mental Medication"	Jobson, Bruford, Holdsworth	7:07
9.	"Drum Solo"	Marco Minnemann	6:59

Disc 2
No.	Title	Length
1.	"Danger Money"	8:29
2.	"Rendezvous 6:02"	5:08
3.	"The Only Thing She Needs"	8:29
4.	"Caesar's Palace Blues"	5:13
5.	"Nothing To Lose"	4:27
6.	"Carrying No Cross"	13:02
7.	"Waiting For You"	5:55
8.	"Night After Night"	5:03
9.	"As Long As You Want Me Here"	5:10

== Personnel ==
U.K.

- Eddie Jobson - keyboards, electric violin
- John Wetton - vocals, bass
- Alex Machacek - guitar
- Marco Minnemann - drums
