= Motivation (disambiguation) =

Motivation is the driving force by which humans achieve their goals.

Motivation may also refer to:

== Music ==
- Motivation (band), a 1980s English rock band
- Motivation (Bertín Osborne album) or the title song, 1989
- Motivation (Moti Special album) or the title song, 1985
- "Motivation" (Kelly Rowland song), 2011
- "Motivation" (Normani song), 2019
- "Motivation" (Sum 41 song), 2002
- "Motivation", a song by Sheryl Crow from Detours, 2008
- "Motivation", a song by Snoop Dogg from 220, 2018
- "Motivation", a song by Carly Rae Jepsen from Day and Night, 2026

== Other uses ==
- Motivation (horse) (foaled 1987), a Thoroughbred racehorse
- The Motivation, a 2013 American documentary film
- "Motivation" (I Pity the Fool), a 2006 television episode
- "Motivation" (The Office), a 2002 television episode
- "Motivation" (Startup U), a 2015 television episode
- Motivation High School, a magnet school in Philadelphia, Pennsylvania, US

== See also ==
- Motiv8 (disambiguation)
- Motivate (disambiguation)
- Motive (disambiguation)
