= Cold Days, Hot Nights =

1984 single by Moti Special

Single by Moti Special

from the album Motivation
- B-side: "Out of Tune (Instrumental)"
- Released: March 1984
- Genre: Synth-pop
- Length: 3:42
- Label: Teldec
- Songwriter(s): Manfred Thiers; Richard Palmer-James
- Producer(s): Moti Special

Moti Special singles chronology
"Stop! Girls Go Crazy" (1984)	"Cold Days, Hot Nights" (1984)	"Don't Be So Shy" (1985)

Audio
- "Cold Days, Hot Nights" on YouTube

"Cold Days, Hot Nights" is a song by German pop band Moti Special, released in 1984 as the second single from their debut studio album, Motivation (1985). The song was co-written by Manfred Thiers and Richard Palmer-James, and produced by Moti Special. The song reached No. 3 in West Germany and No. 4 in Switzerland.

== Track listing and formats ==
- German 7-inch single

A. "Cold Days, Hot Nights" – 3:42
B. "Out of Tune" (Instrumental) – 3:18

- German 12-inch maxi single

A. "Cold Days, Hot Nights" – 5:00
B. "Out of Tune" (Instrumental) – 3:18

== Charts ==
=== Weekly charts ===
Weekly chart performance for "Cold Days, Hot Nights"
Chart (1985)	Peak position
Switzerland (Schweizer Hitparade)	4
West Germany (GfK)	3

=== Year-end charts ===
Year-end chart performance for "Cold Days, Hot Nights"
Chart (1985)	Position
Switzerland (Schweizer Hitparade)	30
West Germany (Official German Charts)	27
