= Reunion – Live in Tokyo =

Live album by UK
- Released: 24 April 2013
- Recorded: 15–18 April 2011
- Venue: Club Città, Tokyo, Japan
- Genre: Progressive rock, Jazz fusion
- Label: Globe Media Arts, Avalon
- Producer: Eddie Jobson

UK chronology
Concert Classics, Vol. 4 (1999)	Reunion – Live in Tokyo (2013)	Curtain Call (2015)

Reunion – Live in Tokyo is a live album by U.K. recorded in April 2011 during their first reunion tour and released in April 2013.

John Wetton and Eddie Jobson had performed three concerts in Poland in November 2009, as documented by the live album Ultimate Zero Tour – Live, released in November 2010. Afterwards, both Jobson and Wetton talked about a possible UK reunion tour in the first months of 2010. The first tour was finally announced in February 2011, with a line-up consisting of Jobson, Wetton, Alex Machacek and Marco Minnemann. Three performances at Club Città in Tokyo in April 2011 were professionally recorded and filmed and subsequently released as a double CD, DVD and DVD + CD.

The set list noticeably included a performance of the song "Nevermore", which was played live for the first time in the band's history, and two King Crimson Wetton-era tunes.

== Track listing ==
All songs written by Eddie Jobson and John Wetton except as noted.

=== Double CD version ===
Disc 1
No.	Title	Writer(s)	Length
1.	"In the Dead of Night"		6:02
2.	"By the Light of Day"		4:46
3.	"Presto Vivace and Reprise"		2:49
4.	"Danger Money"		9:01
5.	"Thirty Years"	Jobson, Wetton, Bill Bruford	8:30
6.	"Alaska"	Jobson	5:00
7.	"Time to Kill"	Jobson, Wetton, Bruford	5:03
8.	"Starless"	David Cross, Robert Fripp, Wetton, Bruford, Richard Palmer-James	11:45
9.	"Carrying No Cross"		11:48

Disc 2
No.	Title	Writer(s)	Length
1.	"Violin Solo"	Jobson	6:15
2.	"Nevermore"	Jobson, Wetton, Allan Holdsworth	8:15
3.	"One More Red Nightmare"	Fripp, Wetton	6:18
4.	"Caesar's Palace Blues"		4:51
5.	"The Only Thing She Needs"		8:50
6.	"Rendezvous 6:02"		6:11

=== DVD + CD version ===
==== DVD ====
1. "In the Dead of Night"
2. "By the Light of Day"
3. "Presto Vivace and Reprise"
4. "Danger Money"
5. "Thirty Years"
6. "Alaska"
7. "Time to Kill"
8. "Starless"
9. "Carrying No Cross"
10. "Drum Solo"
11. "Violin Solo"
12. "Nevermore"
13. "One More Red Nightmare"
14. "Caesar's Palace Blues"
15. "The Only Thing She Needs"
16. "Rendezvous 6:02"

==== CD ====
1. "In the Dead of Night"
2. "By the Light of Day"
3. "Presto Vivace and Reprise"
4. "Danger Money"
5. "Thirty Years"
6. "Starless"
7. "Carrying No Cross"
8. "Nevermore"
9. "Caesar's Palace Blues"
10. "The Only Thing She Needs"
11. "Rendezvous 6:02"

== Personnel ==
U.K.

- Eddie Jobson – keyboards, electric violin
- John Wetton – vocals, bass
- Alex Machacek – guitar
- Marco Minnemann – drums
