= Motivate (disambiguation) =

To motivate is to provide motivation, a reason or incentive for a particular behavior.

Motivate may also refer to:

- Motivate (company), an American company that services bicycle sharing systems
- Motivate Canada, a non-profit youth organization
- Motivate Media Group, a media company based in Dubai, United Arab Emirates
- "Motivate", a 2018 song by Little Mix from LM5

== See also ==
- Motiv8 (disambiguation)
- Motivation (disambiguation)
- Motive (disambiguation)
