= Four Decades =

Live album by Eddie Jobson
- Released: 2015
- Recorded: 9 November 2013
- Venues: Club Città, Kawasaki, Japan
- Genres: Progressive rock, Jazz fusion, Art Rock, Electronic music
- Length: 137:07
- Label: Ward Records
- Producer: Eddie Jobson

Eddie Jobson chronology
Ultimate Zero Tour - Live (2010)	Four Decades (2015)

Four Decades is a live album by Eddie Jobson, celebrating the 40th anniversary of his recording career. The album was recorded during one single night in Kawasaki, Japan.

The set list is made up by songs from his solo albums and by the artists he has performed with during the course of his career, such as Curved Air, Roxy Music, Frank Zappa, U.K., Bruford and UKZ, thus only excluding his period with Jethro Tull in 1980. Sonja Kristina from Curved Air, John Wetton from UK and Aaron Lippert from UKZ make guest appearances for the material they originally performed on, with the latter also taking vocal duties for two other songs.

The album was released as a double CD, DVD and Blu-ray and in a special package together with UK's "Curtain Call".

== Track listing ==
All tracks are written by Eddie Jobson except where noted.

Disc 1
No.	Title	Writer(s)	Original Album	Length
1.	"Intro/Armin"	Jobson, Mike Wedgwood, Kirby Gregory, Jim Russell	Curved Air - Air Cut (1973)	5:00
2.	"It Happened Today"	Francis Monkman, Sonja Kristina	Curved Air - Air Conditioning (1970)	5:02
3.	"U.H.F."	Gregory	Curved Air - Air Cut (1973)	6:40
4.	"Elfin Boy"	Jobson, Kristina	Curved Air - Air Cut (1973)	4:36
5.	"Metamorphosis"	Jobson, Kristina	Curved Air - Air Cut (1973)	11:36
6.	"Out of the Blue"	Bryan Ferry, Phil Manzanera	Roxy Music - Country Life (1974)	4:25
7.	"Läther"	Frank Zappa	Frank Zappa - Zappa in New York (1978)	3:18
8.	"Presto Vivace"		UK - UK (1978)	0:43
9.	"In The Dead of Night"	Jobson, John Wetton	UK - UK (1978)	5:34
10.	"By The Light of Day"	Jobson, Wetton	UK - UK (1978)	4:43
11.	"Presto Vivace & Reprise"	Jobson, Wetton	UK - UK (1978)	2:48
12.	"Rendezvous 6.02"	Jobson, Wetton	UK - Danger Money (1979)	5:26
13.	"Carrying No Cross"	Jobson, Wetton	UK - Danger Money (1979)	12:31
Total length:				71:36

Disc 2
No.	Title	Writer(s)	Original Album	Length
1.	"Alaska"		UK - Danger Money (1979)	5:03
2.	"Resident"		Eddie Jobson / Zinc - The Green Album (1983)	4:33
3.	"Who My Friends..."		Eddie Jobson / Zinc - The Green Album (1983)	6:46
4.	"Prelude"		Eddie Jobson / Zinc - The Green Album (1983)	3:01
5.	"Nostalgia"		Eddie Jobson / Zinc - The Green Album (1983)	2:33
6.	"Spheres of Influence"		Eddie Jobson - Theme of Secrets (1985)	2:25
7.	"Inner Secrets"		Eddie Jobson - Theme of Secrets (1985)	2:58
8.	"Radiation"		UKZ - Radiation (2009)	7:48
9.	"Houston"	Jobson, Aaron Lippert	UKZ - Radiation (2009)	4:33
10.	"Tu-95"		UKZ - Radiation (2009)	4:13
11.	"Through the Glass"		Eddie Jobson / Zinc - The Green Album (1983)	3:38
12.	"Young Mother"	Darryl Way, Kristina	Curved Air - Second Album (1971)	5:57
13.	"Caesar's Palace Blues"	Jobson, Wetton	UK - Danger Money (1979)	5:01
14.	"Forever Until Sunday"	Bill Bruford	Bruford - One of a Kind (1979)	7:02
Total length:				65:31

== Personnel ==
- Eddie Jobson - keyboards, electric violin, vocals (CD 2 2)
- Alex Machacek - guitar
- Ric Fierabracci - bass
- Marco Minnemann - drums, acoustic guitar

Guest musicians

- Sonja Kristina - vocals, acoustic guitar (CD1 2-6, CD2 12)
- John Wetton - vocals, bass (CD1 9-13, CD 2 13)
- Aaron Lippert - vocals (CD 1 6, CD2 3, 8-9, 13)
