= Concert Classics, Vol. 4 =

Concert Classics Vol.4

Live album by U.K.
- Released: 1999
- Recorded: 11 July 1978
- Genre: Progressive rock
- Length: 48:33
- Label: Renaissance Records

U.K. chronology
Night After Night (1979)	Concert Classics Vol.4 (1999)	Reunion – Live in Tokyo (2013)

Alternative cover
- Live in Boston

Professional ratings
Review scores
Source	Rating
AllMusic	3/5 stars
DPRP	8.5/10 stars

Concert Classics is a live album originally recorded for radio broadcast by the band U.K. This album was originally released without the approval of the band, thus it was considered a bootleg.

The album was recorded on 11 July 1978 at Paradise Theatre, Boston, Massachusetts and released on CD in 1999. This album was also re-released in Japan on CD in 2007 as Live in Boston. It has also been released as Live in America. On those later editions the sleeve notes date the concert as September 11, 1978 performed at Paradise Theatre, Boston. There is no specific date given on the Concert Classics edition.

Although this album was originally released without the band's permission, it was finally given an official release in 2016 as part of the box-set Ultimate Collector's Edition.

== Performance ==
The album contains performances of three songs ("The Only Thing She Needs", "Carrying No Cross" and "Caesar's Palace Blues") that would eventually end up on UK's second album, Danger Money (1979), without Allan Holdsworth and Bill Bruford. These versions have different arrangements, including the guitar, contrary to the latter album versions, and lyrics still in progress.

== Packaging errors ==
The track split between "Alaska" and "Time to Kill" is wrong, placing the fast part of the former at the beginning of the latter. The packaging does not mention the final part of "By the Light of Day" and the piece "Presto Vivace" as being the opening part of the "In the Dead of Night" track, although they are there. An even greater error is that the packaging, booklet, and CD label have omitted mention of "The Only Thing She Needs" as being track 3 (thus misidentifying the track numbers for the subsequent songs), even though it actually is included on the disc for a total of seven tracks (all labeling only shows six tracks).

The version included on Ultimate Collector's Edition corrects the errors above, and gives "By the Light of Day" and "Presto Vivace" their own track numbers (thus the CD lists nine tracks).

The photographs of Holdsworth and Bruford on the cover (identical to the Spotify version labeled "Legends Live In Concert Volume 20") are not period correct, showing Bruford markedly older than 29 (his age in 1978), and Holdsworth with his mid-80's era Steinberger GL2.

== Track listing ==
All songs written by Eddie Jobson and John Wetton, except where noted.

No.	Title	Writer(s)	Length
1.	"Alaska"	Eddie Jobson	1:33
2.	"Time to Kill"	Jobson, John Wetton, Bill Bruford	7:17
3.	"The Only Thing She Needs"		7:21
4.	"Carrying No Cross"		9:59
5.	"Thirty Years"	Jobson, Wetton, Bruford	10:03
6.	"In the Dead of Night"		7:50
7.	"Caesar's Palace Blues"		4:30

== Personnel ==
U.K.

- Allan Holdsworth – guitars
- Eddie Jobson – keyboards, electric violin
- John Wetton – bass, lead vocals
- Bill Bruford – drums, percussion
