= Wetton/Manzanera =

Studio album by John Wetton and Phil Manzanera
- Released: 27 April 1987
- Recorded: March – August 1986
- Studio: Gallery Studios, Surrey, England
- Genre: Pop rock, new-age, art rock, ethnic fusion, prog-rock
- Length: 40:48
- Label: Geffen

John Wetton chronology
Caught in the Crossfire (1980)	Wetton/Manzanera (1987)	Battle Lines (1994)

Phil Manzanera chronology
Primitive Guitars (1982)	Wetton/Manzanera (1987)	Crack The Whip (With Andy MacKay) (1988)

Wetton/Manzanera (also known as One World) is a 1987 album by English musicians John Wetton (Ex-King Crimson, U.K., Ex-Asia) and Phil Manzanera (Roxy Music, Quiet Sun, 801, Record producer). The two had previously performed together on tours with Roxy Music and on Manzanera's solo albums Diamond Head and K-Scope. The album features members of two art rock/progressive rock bands, 10cc (Vic Emerson and Kevin Godley) and Yes (Alan White).

== Overview and reception ==
This album arose when John Wetton recorded demos at Phil Manzanera's studio. Manzanera showed Wetton music for an unfinished song, which Wetton completed. The song became "It's Just Love", the first on the album; the pair subsequently agreed to record a full collection.

Wetton had a deal with Geffen – despite the split of Asia after 1985's underperforming Astra – and was allowed by the label to record with Manzanera. The result was released by Geffen.

The album was not well received. For AllMusic, Paul Collins wrote, "With usual suspects (empty love song lyrics, overly slick production), there's an extraordinary lack of personality." Musician reviewer J. D. Considine wrote simply: "Asia Minor."

== Track listing ==
All tracks are written by Phil Manzanera and John Wetton

Side 1

No.	Title	Length
1.	"It's Just Love"	3:39
2.	"Keep On Loving Yourself"	5:12
3.	"You Don't Have to Leave My Life"	4:24
4.	"Suzanne"	3:24
5.	"Round in Circles"	4:32
Total length:		20:30

Side 2

No.	Title	Length
1.	"Do It Again"	4:49
2.	"Every Trick in the Book"	4:06
3.	"One World"	3:54
4.	"I Can't Let You Go"	3:22
5.	"Have You Seen Her Tonight?"	4:47
6.	"Talk to Me" (Bonus track on 2001 reissue)	4:00
Total length:		24:18

== Personnel ==
=== Musicians ===
- John Wetton - lead and backing vocals, bass, guitar, keyboards, producer
- Phil Manzanera - lead guitar, keyboards, possible backing vocals, producer

with

- Vic Emerson - orchestral keyboards
- Alan White - drums, percussion
- Kevin Godley - backing vocals

=== Production ===
- Keith Bessey - producer, engineer
- Richard Evans - design, art direction
- Tony McGee - photography
- Brian Lane and Steve O'Rourke - management
- Greg Fulginiti - original mastering at Artisan Sound Recorders
