= Raised in Captivity =

Studio album by John Wetton
- Released: 1 July 2011
- Recorded: January 2011
- Studio: CircaHQ Studios (Woodland Hills, California)
- Genre: Progressive rock; hard rock; pop rock
- Length: 54:42 (Note: Frontiers FR CD 522)
- Label: Frontiers
- Producer: Billy Sherwood

John Wetton chronology
Rock of Faith (2003)	Raised in Captivity (2011)	Live via Satellite (2015)

Professional ratings
Review scores
Source	Rating
AllMusic	3.5/5 stars
Classic Rock	8/10

Raised in Captivity is the sixth and final solo album by English rock musician John Wetton. It was released on 1 July 2011.

== Track listing ==
All tracks are written by John Wetton and Billy Sherwood, except where noted.

No.	Title	Writer(s)	Length
1.	"Lost for Words"		4:59
2.	"Raised in Captivity"	Wetton, Sherwood, Robert Fripp	6:10
3.	"Goodbye Elsinore"		4:44
4.	"The Last Night of My Life"		5:54
5.	"We Stay Together" (Europe bonus track)		4:27
6.	"The Human Condition"		5:23
7.	"Steffi's Ring"	Wetton	2:37
8.	"The Devil and the Opera House"	Wetton, Sherwood, Richard Palmer-James	6:51
9.	"New Star Rising"		4:34
10.	"Don't Misunderstand Me"		3:44
11.	"Mighty Rivers"	Yoav Goren, Gil Talmi, Anneke van Giersbergen	5:21
Total length:			54:42

Japan bonus tracks
No.	Title	Length
11.	"Face to Face"
12.	"After All"

== Personnel ==
- John Wetton – vocals, acoustic guitar, bass guitar and keyboards; cover and booklet concepts
- Billy Sherwood – guitars, drums and percussion; production

Additional musicians

- Mick Box – guitar (on "New Star Rising")
- Geoff Downes – keyboard (on "Goodbye Elsinore" and "Steffi's Ring")
- Steve Hackett – guitar (on "Goodbye Elsinore")
- Eddie Jobson – violin (on "The Devil and the Opera House")
- Tony Kaye – Hammond organ (on "Human Condition" and "Don't Misunderstand Me")
- Alex Machacek – guitar (on "The Last Night of My Life")
- Steve Morse – guitar (on "Lost for Words")
- Anneke van Giersbergen – duetting vocals (on "Mighty Rivers")

Technical personnel

- Michael Inns – artwork and photography
- Karen Gladwell – artwork and photography
- Carla Huntington – additional photo

== Release history ==
Region	Date	Label	Catalog
Europe	1 July 2011	Frontiers	FR CD 522
North America	12 July 2011	Frontiers	FR CD 522
Japan	24 August 2011	Nexus	KICP 1582
