= The Green Album (Eddie Jobson album) =

Studio album by Eddie Jobson
- Released: 8 August 1983
- Recorded: 1982–83
- Studio: Kingdom Sound; Minot Sound
- Genre: Synthpop, progressive rock, electronic
- Length: 46:21
- Label: Capitol/EMI
- Producer: Eddie Jobson

Eddie Jobson chronology
The Green Album (1983)	Theme of Secrets (1985)

Singles from The Green Album
- 1. "Turn It Over" Released: 1983

The Green Album is the debut album by English rock musician Eddie Jobson, released by Capitol Records in 1983. It is officially credited to Eddie Jobson and Zinc, Zinc being identified in press releases as a backing band consisting of Michael Cuneo (guitars), Jerry Watts (bass), and Michael Barsimanto (drums); however, none of the members of Zinc played on more than half the songs on the album, and only four tracks feature the entire group. Because of this, The Green Album is widely regarded as an Eddie Jobson solo album, similarly to how Runt is considered a Todd Rundgren solo album despite being credited to Runt.

Jobson, a former member of Roxy Music, had also previously played with Curved Air, Frank Zappa, U.K., and Jethro Tull. The album contains Jobson's first (and only) lead vocal performances. It also features ex-Gentle Giant guitarist Gary Green on some tracks. The album features a mostly synthesizer based synthpop / progressive rock sound and is a concept album of sorts, with the lyrics centring on a somewhat Orwellian dystopian future where everything is tinted green. The songs were heavily inspired by the Yamaha CS-80 synthesizer.

Demo versions of "Resident", "Easy for You to Say", "Listen to Reason" and "Green Face" have been leaked to the public. "Nostalgia" and "Walking from Pastel" were included (in different arrangements) in UK's last tour and have also appeared on bootlegs.

== Release and promotion ==
A videoclip for the single "Turn it Over" was recorded. The bass on the videoclip was mimed by bassist Doug Lunn, who doesn't actually play on the album.

The album was first re-released on CD in 1992 by One Way Records. In 2014 it was re-issued in Japan in the Super Audio CD format.

== Reception ==
Professional ratings
Review scores
Source	Rating
Allmusic	2/5 stars

Allmusic gave the album a mixed retrospective review, deeming it "an honest effort of when-prog rock-meets-synth pop", but criticizing the lyrics as uniformly poor. They commented that the album seems to run out of ideas in the second half, but were pleased with the first half, marking the tracks "Green Face" and "Resident" as "two of the best synth pop songs produced in that era."

== Track listing ==
All tracks are written by Eddie Jobson

Side one
No.	Title	Length
1.	"Transporter"	1:11
2.	"Resident"	6:01
3.	"Easy for You to Say"	4:07
4.	"Prelude"	2:30
5.	"Nostalgia"	2:27
6.	"Walking from Pastel"	2:07
7.	"Turn It Over"	4:15

Side two
No.	Title	Length
8.	"Green Face"	4:22
9.	"Who My Friends..."	6:31
10.	"Colour Code"	1:05
11.	"Listen to Reason"	5:56
12.	"Through the Glass"	6:03
13.	"Transporter II"	0:22

== Personnel ==
- Eddie Jobson – keyboards, lead and backing vocals, electric violin, drum machine (7), vocoder
- Nick Moroch – guitar (2,3,8,9)
- Michael Cuneo – guitar (2,9,11,12)
- Gary Green – guitar (11,12)
- Cary Sharaf – guitar (7)
- Jerry Watts – bass (2,5,9,11,12)
- Alon Oleartchik – bass (3,7,8,11)
- Michael Barsimanto – drums (2,3,8,9,11,12)

Production

- All tracks arranged and produced by Eddie Jobson
- Engineered by Clay Hutchinson, Eddie Jobson, Ray Bardani (backing tracks), Ron Cote, Paul Mandl, Richard Hilton (assistant), Dave Wittman (second mixing engineer on 9), Barry Harris (assistant mixing engineer on 9), Gary Helman (assistant mixing engineer on 3,4), Ray Niznik (assistant mixing engineer on 5,7,10,11)
