= Caught in the Crossfire (album) =

- Original UK album cover by Hipgnosis

Studio album by John Wetton
- Released: 7 November 1980
- Recorded: Gallery (Chertsey, Surrey); AIR (London)
- Genre: Hard rock; pop rock
- Length: 41:58
- Label: E.G.
- Producer: John Wetton; John Punter

John Wetton chronology
| Caught in the Crossfire (1980) | Wetton/Manzanera (With Phil Manzanera) (1987) |

Singles from Caught in the Crossfire
- 1. "I'll Be There" Released: 25 July 1980; 2. "Turn On the Radio" Released: 24 October 1980

Professional ratings
Review scores
| Source | Rating |
|---|---|
| AllMusic | 3/5 stars |

Caught in the Crossfire is the debut solo album by the English rock musician John Wetton, released in November 1980 by E.G. Records. Featuring guitarist Martin Barre (of Jethro Tull), drummer Simon Kirke (of Bad Company), as well as saxophonist Malcolm Duncan (of Average White Band), whom Wetton had played with in Mogul Thrash. The album's release took place during a transitional period in Wetton's career, after he had left U.K. but before he joined Wishbone Ash and then formed Asia.

"When Will You Realize?" had been previously recorded by U.K., and released as the B-side of the "Night After Night" single in 1979. Also, the chorus of "Woman" had been reworked in 1974 as an instrumental passage on "Fallen Angel" from King Crimson's then-final album, Red.

Caught in the Crossfire has been reissued numerous times with various album covers. The artwork of the original UK vinyl edition was designed by Hipgnosis art studio. In the U.S., the album was first released in early 1986 by Jem Records.

== Track listing ==
All tracks are written by John Wetton, except where noted

Side one
| No. | Title | Length |
|---|---|---|
| 1. | "Turn On the Radio" | 3:47 |
| 2. | "Baby Come Back" | 3:24 |
| 3. | "When Will You Realize?" | 4:34 |
| 4. | "Cold Is the Night" | 5:22 |
| 5. | "Paper Talk" | 4:00 |

Side two
| No. | Title | Writer(s) | Length |
|---|---|---|---|
| 6. | "Get Away" | | 4:30 |
| 7. | "Caught in the Crossfire" | | 5:03 |
| 8. | "Get What You Want" | Wetton, Pete Sinfield | 3:18 |
| 9. | "I'll Be There" | | 3:33 |
| 10. | "Woman" | | 4:33 |
| Total length: | | | 41:58 |

1999 remastered edition bonus tracks
| No. | Title | Writer(s) | Length |
|---|---|---|---|
| 11. | "Every Inch of the Way" | Curt Cuomo, Wetton | 4:39 |
| 12. | "Out of the Blue" | Bob Marlette, Wetton, Tom Whitlock | 4:32 |
| Total length: | | | 51:10 |

== Personnel ==
- John Wetton – vocals, acoustic & electric guitar, bass guitar, keyboards; production
- Martin Barre – electric guitar (2, 3, 5 & 10)
- Phil Manzanera – electric guitar (7)
- Simon Kirke – drums & percussion
- Malcolm Duncan – saxophone (7 & 9)

Technical personnel

- John Punter – production and engineering
- Martin Moss – engineering
- Richard Mason – engineering
- Nigel Walker – engineering
- Sean Davies – mastering at Strawberry Studios
- Hipgnosis – artwork
