= Theme of Secrets =

Studio album by Eddie Jobson
- Released: 1985
- Recorded: 1984–85
- Studio: Beartracks Studio, Suffern, New York
- Genre: Electronic music
- Length: 41:03
- Label: Private Music
- Producer: Peter Baumann

Eddie Jobson chronology
The Green Album (1983)	Theme of Secrets (1985)	Ultimate Zero – The Best of the U-Z Project Live (2010)

Theme of Secrets was a 'New Age' album written and produced by Eddie Jobson, released in 1985. Contrarily to his previous album The Green Album (1983), this record was not marketed as a band effort, instead being presented as an Eddie Jobson solo album and a showcase for the Synclavier.

A music video of one track, "Memories of Vienna", appeared on the Channel 4 programme Art of Landscape. It featured scenes of the town of Vienna accompanied by the music. This also appeared on VH-1 in the United States. The album was released simultaneously on CD and on LP on Private Music label. It was re-released in South Korea in 2004.

A sequel of the album entitled Theme of Mystery was recorded, but was never released. Jobson made available one track (entitled "Antarctica") to the members of the Zealot's Lounge, his personal fan club.

== Background and recording ==
Jobson later recounted:

The first thing I did was get hold of the [Synclavier] operating manuals, about two months before the system was delivered. I remember sitting on a beach, on vacation in the Caribbean, reading these three giant manuals so I would be able to hit the ground running when the system finally arrived. When I made the Theme of Secrets album a few weeks after the arrival of the Synclavier, I was already familiar enough with the programming software to input many of the electronic motifs, such as the famous ‘bouncing balls,’ typing it all in using only the qwerty keyboard. And as I did the whole album with only a 10MB hard drive and a now unbelievable 4MB of RAM, I also had to develop some novel micro-looping techniques and use the FM synthesis module as much as possible.

== Reception ==
Professional ratings
Review scores
Source	Rating
allmusic	5/5 stars

Allmusic's retrospective review consisted of a single sentence: "This masterpiece of soundscapes was created by using the Synclavier computer, and is a brilliant album from start to finish."

== Track listing ==
All tracks are written by Eddie Jobson

Side one
No.	Title	Length
1.	"Inner Secrets"	3:50
2.	"Spheres of Influence"	2:58
3.	"The Sojourn"	6:30
4.	"Ice Festival"	5:36

Side two
No.	Title	Length
5.	"Theme of Secrets"	5:23
6.	"Memories of Vienna"	5:00
7.	"Lakemist"	6:00
8.	"Outer Secrets"	5:35

== Personnel ==
- Eddie Jobson – synthesizer, synclavier

== Production ==
- Recorded on the Mitsubishi X80 at Beartracks Studio, Suffern, New York.
- Produced by Peter Baumann
- Engineered by Peter Baumann and Eddie Jobson
- Mastered by George Marino
