= Motif =

Generally, a motif is a recurring element or theme in a work of art or media.

Motif may refer to:

== General concepts ==
- Motif (chess composition), an element of a move in the consideration of its purpose
- Motif (folkloristics), a recurring element that creates recognizable patterns in folklore and folk-art traditions
- Motif (music), a salient recurring fragment or succession of notes
- Motif (narrative), any recurring element in a story that has symbolic significance or the reason behind actions
- Motif (textile arts), a recurring element or fragment that, when joined, creates a larger work
- Motif (visual arts), a repeated theme or pattern

== Biochemistry ==
- Sequence motif, a sequence pattern of nucleotides in a DNA sequence or amino acids in a protein
- Short linear motif, a stretch of protein sequence that mediates protein–protein interaction
- Structural motif, a pattern in a protein structure formed by the spatial arrangement of amino acids

== Other uses ==
- Motif (2019 film), 2019 Malaysian Malay-language crime drama film
- Motif (album), a 2008 album by guitarist Steve Howe
- Motif (band), a Swedish experimental jazz band
- Motif (software), a GUI specification and widget toolkit for Unix
- Network motif, patterns (sub-graphs) that recur more often than expected
- Yamaha Motif, a series of music workstations

== See also ==
- Meme
  - Internet meme
- Motive (disambiguation)
