= Night After Night (U.K. album) =

Live album by U.K.
- Released: 7 September 1979
- Recorded: 29, 30 May and 4 June 1979
- Venues: Nakano Sun Plaza Hall (Tokyo, Japan); Nippon Seinenkan (Tokyo, Japan)
- Genre: Progressive rock
- Length: 42:13; 96:37 (extended version)
- Label: E.G.
- Producers: Eddie Jobson, John Wetton

U.K. chronology
Danger Money (1979)	Night After Night (1979)	Concert Classics Vol.4 (1999)

Singles from Night After Night
- 1. "Night After Night" Released: 14 September 1979; 2. "Rendezvous 6:02" Released: 1979 (US)

Professional ratings
Review scores
Source	Rating
Allmusic	3/5 stars

Night After Night is a live album recorded by the British band U.K. It features the trio lineup of Eddie Jobson, John Wetton, and Terry Bozzio.

Recorded in late May and early June 1979 at Nakano Sun Plaza Hall and Nippon Seinenkan, Tokyo, Japan, it is UK's third album and their first live recording, released in September 1979 in support of the band's US tour supporting Jethro Tull (which Eddie Jobson joined after UK's split) and later headlining European tour.

The album was remastered in 2016 and included as part of the box-set Ultimate Collector's Edition, along with an extended version containing nine songs not included in the original album and in actual concert order.

== Background ==
According to Eddie Jobson, the album was recorded at the request of Polydor in Tokyo, originally intended for a Japan-only release, but Polydor in the US were also interested in releasing it. John Wetton explained, "The Japanese record companies, they said that live albums are so popular in Japan right now, that any act coming in, it's almost compulsory to do a live album in Japan, just for release in Japan."

The title track and "As Long As You Want Me Here" do not appear on any studio release by the band.

== Track listing ==
All songs written by Eddie Jobson and John Wetton except where indicated.

=== Original album ===
Side one
No.	Title	Length
1.	"Night After Night"	5:21
2.	"Rendezvous 6:02"	5:17
3.	"Nothing to Lose"	5:25
4.	"As Long As You Want Me Here"	5:00

Side two
No.	Title	Writer(s)	Length
1.	"Alaska"	Jobson	4:21
2.	"Time to Kill"	Jobson, Wetton, Bill Bruford	4:17
3.	"Presto Vivace"	Jobson	1:12
4.	"In the Dead of Night"		6:22
5.	"Caesar's Palace Blues"		4:58

=== Extended version ===
Disc 1
No.	Title	Writer(s)	Length
1.	"Night After Night"		5:09
2.	"Danger Money" (previously unreleased)		8:08
3.	"The Only Thing She Needs" (previously unreleased)		9:14
4.	"Nothing to Lose"		5:12
5.	"Bass Solo" (previously unreleased)	Wetton	5:15
6.	"Thirty Years" (previously unreleased)	Jobson, Wetton, Bruford	6:16
7.	"Carrying No Cross" (previously unreleased)		13:27
8.	"Rendezvous 6:02"		5:32
9.	"As Long As You Want Me Here"		5:02

Disc 2
No.	Title	Writer(s)	Length
1.	"Alaska"	Jobson	4:18
2.	"Time to Kill"	Jobson, Wetton, Bruford	4:20
3.	"Violin Solo" (previously unreleased)	Jobson	4:32
4.	"Time to Kill - Reprise" (previously unreleased)	Jobson, Wetton, Bruford	2:21
5.	"By the Light of Day - Part II" (previously unreleased)	Jobson	1:36
6.	"Presto Vivace"	Jobson	1:05
7.	"Drum Solo" (previously unreleased)	Terry Bozzio	3:45
8.	"In the Dead of Night"		6:22
9.	"Caesar's Palace Blues"		5:02

== Personnel ==
U.K.

- Eddie Jobson – keyboards, electric violin, electronics, backing vocals
- John Wetton – bass, lead vocals
- Terry Bozzio – drums, backing vocals

== Singles ==
In the UK and other European countries, an edited version of the title track, "Night After Night" was released as a single backed by the non-album studio track "When Will You Realize?", a song later re-recorded by John Wetton for his solo album Caught in the Crossfire from 1980.
