= Monkey Business 1972–1997 =

Compilation album by John Wetton and Richard Palmer-James
- Released: 8 June 1998
- Recorded: 1972 – May 1998
- Studio: Musicland (Milner Sound, London); Garage, East Grinstead; Liscombe Park; Gallery Studios
- Genre: Progressive rock; art rock
- Length: 62:08
- Label: Blueprint
- Producer: John Wetton; Richard Palmer-James

Monkey Business 1972–1997 is an album by English musicians John Wetton and Richard Palmer-James, it features various demos and live performances of songs originally recorded by King Crimson (of which Wetton and Palmer-James were singer/bassist and lyricist respectively), Jack-Knife (which was another Wetton and Palmer-James project) and John Wetton. The album was first released 1998 and again in 2014 with I Wish You Would by Jack-Knife.

== Overview ==
The collaboration between the two musicians began in 1962 when they met at school. In 1972 they rejoined forces in King Crimson (KC), for which Palmer-James wrote the lyrics. Some of the material that would have been on the follow-up to Wetton's last album with King Crimson, Red, is found here in demo form. The classic KC songs 'Book of Saturday' and 'Starless' are featured as instrumental raw demos that were home taped as a basis for lyric-writing. To be more precise, the latter is only a half minute beginning played twice. The disc ends pleasantly with the pair's recording of 'Starless' from 1997. From the same year are 'Doctor Diamond' and 'Cologne 1997', both among the most worthy contents of this release. The latter song, concerning "the mixed feelings of many Americans born after 1945 of German origin on first visiting their emigre parents' home country", is featured also in its original form recorded in 1977.

Some of the material appears out of some writing sessions from late 1976 when the two musician spend some time at a French farmhouse, writing material.

The album features Wetton and Palmer-James on most of the instrumentation, with Palmer-James playing guitar and providing some vocals (as he did with Supertramp), as well as programming, and Wetton on bass, guitar, keyboards, and most vocals. Many contributors from various stages of Wetton's musical career, including former King Crimson bandmate Bill Bruford (drums), fellow Jack-Knife members John Hutcheson (Hammond organ) and Curt Cress (drums). The live tracks feature various members of John Wetton's live band including Thomas Radl (drums), Ramon Vega (guitar), Bob Dalton (cymbals), and John Beck (keyboards). Dalton and Beck are also members of Prog pop band It Bites. Due to the nature of the album being a compilation, it was recorded in various locations including studios in Munich in Germany (where Palmer-James lived) also London, Sussex and Bedfordshire.

== Track listing ==
All lyrics are written by Richard Palmer-James (except noted)

No.	Title	Lyrics	Music	Length
1.	"(Flourish)"	Instrumental		0:12
2.	"Too Much Monkey Business"	Chuck Berry	Chuck Berry	2:29
3.	"Confessions"		Palmer-James	2:13
4.	"Easy Money"		Bill Bruford, David Cross, Jamie Muir, John Wetton, Robert Fripp	1:01
5.	"The Night Watch" (live)		Wetton, Fripp	4:08
6.	"Woman"	Wetton	Wetton	1:30
7.	"(False Start)"	instrumental		0:18
8.	"Untitled"	Wetton, Palmer-James	Wetton, Palmer-James	0:42
9.	"Rich Men Lie"		Palmer-James	5:32
10.	"Cologne 1977"		Palmer-James	4:38
11.	"The Laughing Lake 1"		Wetton	2:19
12.	"The Good Ship Enterprise"		Wetton	4:08
13.	"Book of Saturday" (demo)		Wetton, Fripp	1:46
14.	"Book of Saturday" (live)		Wetton, Fripp	2:56
15.	"The Glory of Winning"	Wetton, Palmer-James	Geoff Downes, Wetton	4:26
16.	"Starless 1"	Wetton, Palmer-James	Wetton, Fripp	0:33
17.	"The Laughing Lake 2"		Wetton	0:38
18.	"The Laughing Lake 3"		Wetton	0:14
19.	"The Laughing Lake 1977"		Wetton	1:19
20.	"Magazines"		Wetton	2:58
21.	"Starless 2"	Wetton, Palmer-James	Wetton, Fripp	0:33
22.	"Cologne 1997"		Palmer-James	4:19
23.	"Doctor Diamond 1997"		Bruford, Cross, Wetton, Fripp	4:45
24.	"Starless 1997"	Wetton, Palmer-James	Wetton, Fripp	5:31
Total length:				62:08

== Personnel ==
=== Musicians ===
- John Wetton – vocals (all but 1, 5, 7, 22), additional vocals (22), bass guitar (2, 3, 12), guitar (3, 5, 6, 11, 12, 17, 18, 21), piano (4, 13, 14, 16, 20), clavinet (8), keyboards (12), all instruments (10, 19)
- Richard Palmer-James – guitar (2, 8), all instruments/programming (9, 15, 22, 23, 24), additional keyboards (19), vocals (23)
- Ramon Vega – guitar (5)
- John Hutcheson – Hammond organ (2); black and white photography
- John Beck – keyboards (14)
- Curt Cress – drums (2)
- Bill Bruford – drums (3, 4, 12)
- Thomas Radl – drums (5)
- Bob Dalton – cymbal (14)

=== Production ===
- John Wetton – production, sleeve art direction
- Richard Palmer-James – production, sleeve art direction, pre-mastering on a Macintosh, recording (6, 8, 9, 11, 15, 16, 17, 18, 20, 21, 22, 23, 24), mixing (9, 15, 22, 23, 24)
- Martin Smith – mixing (5)
- Jürgen Koppers – recording and mixing (2)
- Julian Mendelsohn – recording (3, 10, 12, 19
- Paul Kennedy – vocals recording (9, 15, 22, 23, 24)
- Ichi Ichinobu – recording (14)
- Rob Ayling – coordinator
- Mixed Images Ltd. – design
- Chris Thorpe – mastering at Serendipity
