= Motive =

Motive(s) or The Motive(s) may refer to:

- Motivation
- Motive (law)

== Entertainment ==
=== Film and television ===
- Motives (film), a 2004 thriller
- The Motive (film), 2017
- Motive (TV series), a 2013 Canadian TV series
- The Motive (TV series), a 2020 Israeli TV series
- "The Motive", a 1958 episode of Alfred Hitchcock Presents

=== Podcasts and radio ===
- Motive (podcast), true crime podcast by the Chicago Sun-Times and WBEZ

=== Music ===
- Motive (rapper), Turkish rapper
- Motive (album), a 1990 album by Red Box
- "Motive" (song), a 2020 song by Ariana Grande and Doja Cat
- "The Motive" (song), a 1987 song by Then Jerico

== Other uses ==
- Motive (algebraic geometry)
- Motive, Inc, a software manufacturer
- Motive Studio, a video game company
- Motive (company), a technology company

== See also ==
- Motif (disambiguation)
- Motivation (disambiguation)
