= Va Por Ellos =

Studio album by Bertín Osborne
- Released: 2008
- Studio: SonicProjects
- Genre: Latin, Ranchera
- Label: Bertín Osborne Intermediaciones
- Producer: Bertín Osborne, Miguel Sierralta Jr.

Bertín Osborne chronology
Algo Contigo (2005)	''Va Por Ellos'' (2008)	A Mi Manera (2012)

Va Por Ellos (This Is for Them) is a studio album released by the Spanish singer Bertín Osborne in 2008. The disc was recorded at SonicProjects studio in Miami, Florida.

The album has cover versions of songs made famous by Pepe Aguilar, Ricardo Montaner and Vicente Fernandez, among others. A ranchera album, Osborne is accompanied by members of the U.S.-based troupe Mariachi Mexico Internacional Si Señor on the disc. This is Osborne's third ranchera-styled disc, following Sabor A México in 2000 and Mis Recuerdos in 2002, both Top 10 albums in Spain. "I grew up listening to mariachi and ranchera music, listening to Pedro Infante and Jorge Negrete," Osborne told ABC (newspaper) in Madrid during promotion of Va Por Ellos. "I'm very tied to Mexico. It's like my second home."

The disc was sold exclusively through El Corte Inglés locations in Spain. All proceeds from sales were donated to Fundación Padre Garralda. "The benefits are directed toward a foundation that helps children who have not had as easy as I or my children," Osborne told Escaparate de Sevilla magazine. "Music for me now is a hobby, not a profession, and I intend to approach it in this manner." The following year, Osborne and his wife, Fabiola Martínez Benavides, formed their own humanitarian organization, Fundación Bertín Osborne, which aids children with brain injuries.

== Track listing ==
1. "Por Mujeres Como Tú" (Pepe Aguilar) - 3:30
2. "Sólo Con Un Beso" (Fernando Osorio) - 3:19
3. "América, América" (Pablo Herrero, José Luis Armenteros)- 3:21
4. "Chaparrita Consentida" (Pepe Aguilar) - 2:27
5. "México Lindo" (Jesús Monge Ramírez) - 3:13
6. "Volver, Volver" (Fernando Z. Maldonado) - 3:46
7. "Un Mundo Raro" (José Alfredo Jiménez) - 3:25
8. "Dos Cruces" (Carmelo Larrea) - 3:09
9. "No Me Amenaces" (José Alfredo Jiménez) - 2:22
10. "No Volveré" (Manuel Esperón, Ernesto Cortazar)- 3:29
