= Bertín Osborne =

Spanish singer (born 1954)

The Count of Donadío de Casasola
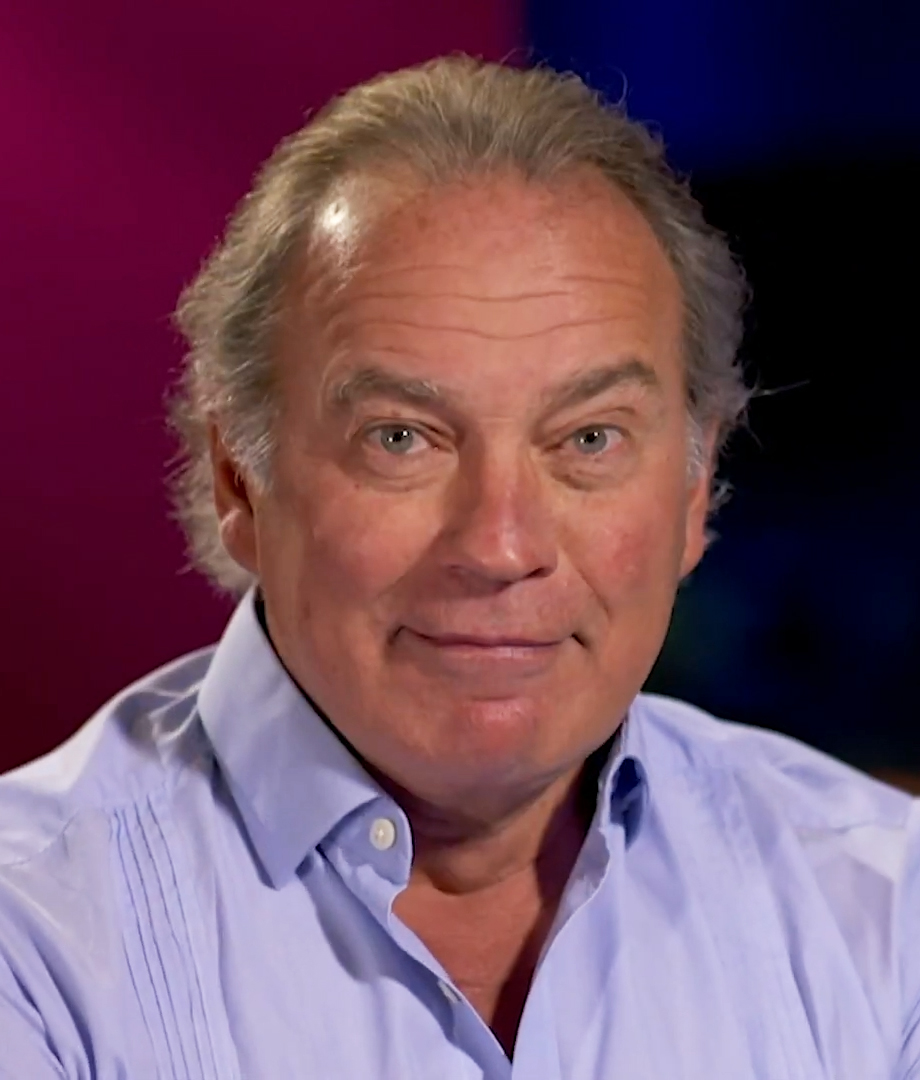
- Osborne in 2019
- Born: Norberto Juan Ortiz y Osborne; 7 December 1954 (age 71); Madrid, Spain
- Occupation: Singer
- Spouse: Alejandra "Sandra" Domecq Williams (m. 1977–1991) Fabiola Martínez Benavides (m. 2006)
- Children: 6: Alejandra Ortiz Domecq (1978); Eugenia Ortiz Domecq (1986); Claudia Ortiz Domecq (1989); Cristian Ortiz Domecq (d. 1977); Norberto Enrique Ortiz Martínez; Carlos Alberto Ortiz Martínez
- Father: Enrique Ortiz López-Valdemoro (1928-2024)

Norberto Juan Ortiz y Osborne, 9th Count of Donadío de Casasola (born 7 December 1954), better known as Bertín Osborne, is a Spanish singer.

== Biography ==
He was born in Madrid from an aristocrat father, Enrique Ortiz y López-Valdemoro (1928-2024), but raised in Puerto de Santa María and later in Jerez de la Frontera. His maternal surname comes from a great-great-great grandfather who immigrated from Exeter, England to Puerto de Santa María, Spain during the late 18th century and founded the Osborne Group wine company.

== Career ==
Osborne's first musical performance was in 1971 at the Song Festival at El Escorial, but he had to wait until 1980 to sign his first contract to record an album.

Bertín is also an occasional actor. His acting is credited in several TV-novels and fiction TV-series, some of them were South American TV-productions. He has barely participated in film acting, but he is more of an actor when it comes to television series.

== Personal life ==
Osborne was married to Alejandra "Sandra" Domecq Williams, from 1977 until their divorce in 1991. She died in 2004. The couple had three daughters: Alejandra (b. 1978), Eugenia (b. 1986) and Claudia (b. 1989), as well as a son (Cristian; 1977–1977), who died at less than one year of age.

He remarried, on 10 June 2006, Fabiola Martínez Benavides, from Maracaibo, Venezuela; the couple has two children, Norberto Enrique and Carlos Alberto. Norberto was diagnosed with cerebral palsy, which led Bertin to create the Fundación Bertín Osborne, a non-profit organization devoted to helping children with this diagnosis. Bertin has brought his son to The Institutes for the Achievement of Human Potential (IAHP) for treatment, and has used his foundation to spread the word in Spain about IAHP's work.

In June 2025 he succeeded his father as the 9th Count of Donadío de Casasola.

== Discography ==
Year	Album	SPA	Label
1981	Amor Mediterráneo	–	Hispavox
1982	Como Un Vagabundo	13	Hispavox
1984	Tal Como Soy	2	Hispavox
1985	Buena Suerte	6	Hispavox
1986	Dos Corazones Y Un Destino	36	Hispavox
1988	Vida O Castigo	49	WEA
1989	Motivation^{[A]}	–	Iperspazio
1990	Acuerdate de Mí	–	WEA
1991	En Soledad	–	WEA
1993	Quiero Estar Contigo	–	Divucsa
2000	Sabor A México	1	Mercury
2002	Mis Recuerdos	8	Mercury
2004	Bendita América	25	Universal
2005	Algo Contigo	46	EMI
2008	Va Por Ellos^{[B]}	–	Bertín Osborne Intermediaciones
2012	A Mi Manera	10	Sony
2013	Corazón Ranchero	10	Sony
2015	Crooner	16	Sony
2016	Va Por Ellas	43	Sony
2018	Yo Debí Enamorarme de Tu Madre	5	Concert Music Entertainment

Year	Selected compilations	SPA	Label
1992	21 Black Jack	–	EMI
1998	Todos Sus Singles En Hispavox (1981–1985)	–	RamaLama Music
2000	Mayor de Edad	–	EMI
2000	Lo Mejor de Bertín Osborne	–	WEA
2003	Grandes Éxitos	–	WEA
2003	Todo Lo Mejor de Bertín Osborne	–	Divucsa
2004	15 de Colección	–	EMI
2005	Solo Lo Mejor	–	EMI
2007	20 Canciones De Oro (Grandes Éxitos)	15	EMI
2021	40 Años Son Pocos	27	Universal Music Spain

Notes

- A. Motivation is an English-language album that was not released in Spain but appeared in other European territories. The Iperspazio pressing is from Italy.
- B. Va Por Ellos is a fund-raising disc with proceeds benefiting Fundación Padre Garralda. In Spain, the disc was sold exclusively through El Corte Inglés locations.

== Television ==
- Mi casa es la tuya (Bertín as a host and interviewer)

Years	Programme	Channel	Role
1990-91	Amor de nadie	Las Estrellas	Actor
1992-94	Contacto con tacto	Telecinco	Presenter
1993	Veraneando	Telecinco	Presenter
1994	La batalla de las estrellas	Telecinco	Presenter
1994	Scavengers	Antena 3	Presenter
1995	Genio y figura	Antena 3	Presenter
1995	Alondra	Televisa	Actor
1995-2001	Lluvia de estrellas	Antena 3	Presenter
1995-2001	Menudas estrellas	Antena 3	Presenter
1997	La cara divertida	Antena 3	Presenter
1998	Esos locos bajitos	Antena 3	Presenter
1999-2002	Trato hecho	Antena 3	Presenter
2001	La mujer 10	Antena 3	Presenter
2002	Verano noche	Antena 3	Presenter
2004	Cada día	Antena 3	Presenter
2005-06	Ankawa	TVE	Presenter
2005-06	Ven a triunfar	7RM	Presenter
2007-09	El Gran Prix del Verano	FORTA channels	Presenter
2009	Esta canción va por tí	Canal Sur	Presenter
2009	Un beso y una flor	Canal Nou	Presenter
2010	BertiNiños	Intereconomía	Presenter
2010	Noche de bodas	Intereconomía	Presenter
2010	Un granito de arena	Intereconomía	Presenter
2013	El gran debate	Telecinco	Guest
2014	Un tiempo nuevo	Telecinco	Collaborator
2014-15	Hable con ellas	Telecinco	Guest
2015-16	En la tuya o en la mía	TVE	Presenter
2016, 2018, 2019	El Hormiguero 3.0	Antena 3	Guest
2016-present	Mi casa es la tuya	Telecinco	Presenter
2018-present	Mi casa es la vuestra	Telecinco	Presenter
2019	Volverte a ver	Cuatro	Guest
2019-present	Viva la vida	Telecinco	Collaborator
2020-present	El show de Bertín	Canal Sur	Presenter
2020-present	El show de Bertín	Telemadrid	Presenter
2021	Mask Singer: Adivina quién canta	Antena 3	Contestant as Crocodile
2025	Tu cara me suena	Antena 3	Contestant
2026	Una fiesta de muerte	Antena 3	Contestant
