= Moti Special =

German new wave band

- Origin: Hamburg, West Germany
- Genre: New wave
- Years active: 1981–1990
- Labels: TELDEC, Polydor
- Past members: Michael Cretu; Reinhard Tarrach; Manfred Thiers; Nils Tuxen; Frank Adahl; Anders Mossberg

Moti Special was a West German new wave band, formed in 1981 in Hamburg, by Danish guitar player Nils Tuxen, German-Romanian keyboardist Michael Cretu, bassist/vocalist Manfred "Thissy" Thiers, and drummer Reinhard "Dickie" Tarrach, all of whom had previous experience as session musicians. Thiers decided on the name of the band after visiting an Indian restaurant in London together with German-Israeli artist Moti Argaman, where they had the "special" (extra spicy) dish of the house.

== History ==
Formed in 1981, it was not until 1985 that the band became successful. Although their first single, "Stop! Girls Go Crazy", did not chart, the follow-up, "Cold Days, Hot Nights", was a major hit in Europe, reaching number 3 in West Germany. The third single "Don't Be So Shy" made it to number 9. The band's first album, Motivation, reached number 20 on the charts in that same year.

Michael Cretu left the band to pursue his solo career, and production work with various artists, including his wife, '80s singer Sandra.

Tarrach and Tuxen met swedish bassplayer Anders Mossberg in 1988 at a Copenhagen album-session and afterwards invited Mossberg to join a new version of Moti Special. Mossberg knew singer/keyboardplayer Frank Adahl and he agreed to join the band shortly afterwards. This new version of Moti Special signed a deal with Polydor and recorded the album Dancing for Victory in different studios in Denmark (PUK-studios), England (the Church studio) and several german and swedish studios. The release of their first single - In Love We Stand - got heavy airplay an also featured on MTV. It was followed by promowork in the fall of 1989 where the band did TV-shows and radioappearances all over Germany and BeNeLux. Frank Adahl left the band in early 1990 when Edin-Adahl, a swedish band with Frank and his brother Simon, won the swedish Eurovison Song Contest.

Nothing was heard of from the band again until 1989, when a new single, In Love We Stand, was released. The album, along with its title-track, Dancing for Victory were not that well-received as the first album was. Two new members had also been added: Frank Adahl – vocals/keyboards and Anders Mossberg – basses. They were both session-musicians from Sweden. By then, Tuxen and Tarrach were the only original members still in the band.

Michael Cretu has since had a successful career, as a solo artist, collaborator, writer, producer, and most notably, as the creator of Enigma. He also recorded an album with Manfred Thiers as Cretu & Thiers. Their album Belle Epoque was released in 1988.

Manfred Thiers is still working as a session bass player, and in 2005 performed on the album The Voice of Leonard Bernstein, alongside Leonard Bernstein, José Carreras, and Dame Kiri Te Kanawa, as well as many other great performers. More importantly, he is also a member of Schiller-live Band (Weltreise/Voyage, Leben/Life and Tag und Nacht/Night and Day live tour).

In 2006, official remixes of "Cold Days, Hot Nights" (by DJ/producer Arnold Palmer) took the track, now re-titled simply as "Cold Days", into the top 5 of the official German Dance chart. A subsequent full release has yet to materialise despite the track's considerable success in German clubs.

== Discography ==
=== Albums ===
- Motivation (1985)
- Dancing for Victory (1990)

=== Singles ===
- "Stop! Girls Go Crazy" (1984)
- "Cold Days, Hot Nights" (1984) West Germany No. 3, Switzerland No. 4
- "Don't Be So Shy" (1985) West Germany No. 9, Switzerland No. 10
- "Stop! Girls Go Crazy (Remix)" (1985) West Germany No. 53
- "In Love We Stand" (1989)
- "Behind Closed Doors" (1990)
- "Dancing for Victory" (1990)
- "Megamix '98" (1998) Germany No. 66
- "Cold Days" (2006), promo-only release credited as Arnold Palmer vs. Moti Special
