= Ultimate Zero Tour – Live =

Live album by Eddie Jobson
- Released: 26 November 2010
- Recorded: Regent Theatre, Boston, 19 August 2009; Kraków, Poland, 3 November 2009; Bydgoszcz, Poland, 5 November 2009; Perm, Russia, 9 November 2009
- Genres: Progressive rock, jazz fusion
- Length: 102:33
- Labels: Seven Seas, Glo Digital
- Producer: Eddie Jobson

Eddie Jobson chronology
Theme of Secrets (1985)	Ultimate Zero Tour – Live (2010)	Four Decades (2015)

Ultimate Zero Tour – Live is a live album by Eddie Jobson and his U-Z Project. The album is compiled from 2009 performances in Poland, Russia, and the United States by various line-ups. Musicians include John Wetton, Tony Levin, Greg Howe, Trey Gunn, Marco Minnemann and Simon Phillips. The album marks the first time Jobson and Wetton publicly collaborated since the breakup of U.K. in 1979.

Tracks include compositions originally performed by UK, including "The Sahara of Snow", a song that ended up on Bill Bruford's second solo album "One of a Kind" as well as King Crimson and Mahavishnu Orchestra covers and five solo spots.

The album was first released on 26 November 2010 in Japan. The album was produced and engineered by Jobson himself.

== Track listing ==
All songs written by Eddie Jobson except as noted.

Disc U
No.	Title	Writer(s)	Length
1.	"Alaska"		5:06
2.	"Presto Vivace"		0:34
3.	"In The Dead of Night"	Jobson, John Wetton	6:40
4.	"Starless"	David Cross, Robert Fripp, Wetton, Bill Bruford, Richard Palmer-James	11:56
5.	"Zero 1 (Ric)"	Ric Fierabracci	3:10
6.	"Book of Saturday"	Fripp, Wetton, Palmer-James	3:06
7.	"Zero 2 (Marco)"	Marco Minnemann	4:55
8.	"One More Red Nightmare"	Fripp, Wetton	7:15
9.	"Caesar's Palace Blues"	Jobson, Wetton	4:55
10.	"Sahara Of Snow Pt. II"	Jobson, Bruford	3:48
Total length:			51:25

Disc Z
No.	Title	Writer(s)	Length
1.	"Zero 3 (Tony)"	Tony Levin	3:15
2.	"Red"	Fripp	6:17
3.	"Zero 4 (Trey)"	Trey Gunn	1:21
4.	"Awakening"	John McLaughlin	7:34
5.	"Zero 5 (Eddie): I. "Ice Festival"; II. "Theme of Secrets"; III. "Prelude""		9:09
6.	"Carrying No Cross"	Jobson, Wetton	12:04
7.	"The Only Thing She Needs"	Jobson, Wetton	8:01
8.	"Nevermore (ending)"	Allan Holdsworth, Jobson, Wetton	3:27
Total length:			51:08

== Personnel ==
- Eddie Jobson - keyboards, electric violin (CD1 1–5, 8–10, CD2 1–8)
- Marco Minnemann - drums (CD1 1–4, 7–10, CD2 2, 4, 6–8)
- John Wetton - vocals, bass, acoustic guitar (CD1 3–4, 6, 8–10, CD2 6–8)
- Tony Levin - stick (CD1 3–4, 6, 8–10, CD2 1, 7–8)
- Greg Howe - guitar (CD1 1–4, 8–10, CD2 2, 4, 7–8)
- Ric Fierabracci - bass (CD1 1–2 5, CD2 2)
- Simon Phillips - drums (CD2 4)
- Trey Gunn - touch guitar (CD2 3–4)
