= Motivation (Bertín Osborne album) =

Studio album by Bertín Osborne
- Released: 1989
- Genre: Pop
- Label: Iperspazio
- Producer: Wes Farrell, Rudy Pérez

Bertín Osborne chronology
Vida O Castigo (1988)	''Motivation'' (1989)	Acuerdate de Mi (1990)

Motivation is a studio album released by Bertín Osborne in 1989. It was the first (and to date, only) all-English-language release from the popular Spanish singer. The album was recorded in Miami, Florida, at Criteria Studios and Middle Ear Recording Studio.

Despite Osborne's popularity in Spain, the disc was not officially released in his home country, though it was available as an import.

== Track listing ==
1. "Motivation" (Rudy Pérez, J. Farrell) - 3:55
2. "Like a Fool" (Bee Gees) - 4:06
3. "If I Could Only Change Her Mind" (Scott Cutler, Clyde Lieberman) - 3:40
4. "Toys" (Bee Gees) - 5:03
5. "Fallin'" (Michael Bolton, Bobby Caldwell) - 3:55
6. "Freedom" (Riccardo Cocciante, J. Johnston) - 3:41
7. "Closer to the Edge" (Bernie Taupin, Martin Page) - 4:49
8. "Prove Me Wrong" (Billy Simon, Wayne Kirkpatrick) - 4:25
9. "On the Heels of a Heartache" (B. Crew, J. Corbetta, M. Holden) - 4:19
10. "The End" (D. Kisselbach, L. Merlino) - 3:44

== Personnel ==
- Bertín Osborne – lead vocals
- Rudy Pérez – guitar, percussion, backing vocals, additional engineering
- Brian Monroney – guitar
- Rene Luis Toledo – guitar
- Julio Hernandez - bass guitar
- George "Chocolate" Perry – bass guitar
- Richard Eddie – programming and keyboards
- Tony Concepcion - horns
- Kenny Faulk - horns
- Dana Tebo - horns
- Ed Calle - horns
- Rita Quintero - backing vocals
- Wendy Pedersen - backing vocals
- Latisha Vining - backing vocals
- Mike Couzzi – engineering and mixing
- Mike Spring - additional engineering, assistant engineer
- Mike Fuller - mastering
- Paco Navarro - cover photo
- Antonio Gramatica - cover design
