= The Motive (TV series) =

- Genre: True crime docuseries
- Created by: Tali Shemesh; Asaf Sudri
- Directed by: Tali Shemesh; Asaf Sudri
- Country of origin: Israel
- Original language: Hebrew
- No. of episodes: 4

Production
- Producers: Tali Shemesh; Asaf Sudri
- Running time: 31–42 minutes
- Production company: yes

Original release
- Release: December 27 – December 30, 2020

The Motive (Hebrew: המניע) is a four-part Israeli docuseries that explores the 1986 killings of four family members by a 14-year-old boy in Jerusalem. It was created by Tali Shemesh and Asaf Sudri. The series includes reconstructions of the original events featuring actors. It was broadcast in Israel on the Yes Docu channel in December 2020, and released on Netflix on 28 October 2021.
