= U.K. (album) =

Studio album by U.K.
- Released: 14 April 1978
- Recorded: December 1977 – January 1978
- Studios: Trident Studios, London, England
- Genres: Progressive rock, jazz fusion
- Length: 46:30
- Label: E.G.
- Producer: U.K.

U.K. chronology
U.K. (1978)	Danger Money (1979)

Singles from U.K.
- 1. "In The Dead of Night" Released: 12 May 1978

Professional ratings
Review scores
Source	Rating
AllMusic	4/5 stars
Christgau's Record Guide	C+

U.K. is the debut album by the progressive rock supergroup U.K., released in April 1978 through E.G. Records and Polydor Records. It features John Wetton, Eddie Jobson, Bill Bruford, and Allan Holdsworth. The album was well received by FM album rock radio and by the public during the summer of 1978. The LP sold just over 250,000 copies by 1 September 1978, with further sales through the rest of the year. The album was remastered in 2016 and included as part of the box-set "Ultimate Collector's Edition". "In the Dead of Night" and "Mental Medication" were both edited for a single A- and B-side release.

== Writing ==
"Alaska" was written by Eddie Jobson for the Yamaha CS-80. The first three tracks belong to a suite entitled "In the Dead of Night", which began as a chord sequence by Jobson, to which Wetton added the melody and lyrics. Early versions of "In the Dead of Night" and "Thirty Years" were written before the formation of the band.

== Legacy ==
In 2015, Rolling Stone magazine ranked it as the 30th best progressive rock album of all time.

In an interview with the TeamRock site in 2016, Ty Tabor of King's X selected the album as his top pick in a "5 Essential Guitar Albums" list, stating, "I had never heard anybody think about playing guitar the way that [Holdsworth] plays on that record."

== Track listing ==
Side one
No.	Title	Writer(s)	Length
1.	"In the Dead of Night"	Eddie Jobson, John Wetton	5:38
2.	"By the Light of Day"	Jobson, Wetton	4:32
3.	"Presto Vivace and Reprise"	Jobson, Wetton	2:58
4.	"Thirty Years"	Wetton, Jobson, Bill Bruford	8:05

Side two
No.	Title	Writer(s)	Length
1.	"Alaska"	Jobson	4:45
2.	"Time to Kill"	Jobson, Wetton, Bruford	4:55
3.	"Nevermore"	Allan Holdsworth, Jobson, Wetton	8:09
4.	"Mental Medication"	Holdsworth, Bruford, Jobson	7:26 (Note: Duration incorrectly listed as 6:12 on original LP pressings of the album.)

== Personnel ==
U.K.

- Allan Holdsworth – acoustic & electric guitar
- Eddie Jobson – keyboards, electric violin, electronics, add acoustic guitar on 7
- John Wetton – bass, lead and backing vocals
- Bill Bruford – drums, percussion

Production

- Stephen W. Tayler – engineering, mixing

== Charts ==
Chart (1978)	Peak position
Canada Top Albums/CDs (RPM)	53
UK Albums (Official Charts)	43
US Billboard 200	65
