= Motiv8 =

Motiv8, a pun on the word "motivate", may refer to:

- "Motiv8" (song), a 2018 song by J. Cole
- Motiv 8 (producer), alias of Steve Rodway, English dance music producer
- DJ Motiv8, American turntablist for 1990s hip hop group Atban Klann
- Motiv8 Technologies, an American company founded by Eugene Lee
- Motiv8, a nonprofit foundation by football player Marcus Mariota

== See also ==
- Motivate (disambiguation)
