= Mogul Thrash =

English progressive rock band

- Origin: England
- Genres: Progressive rock, jazz fusion, experimental rock
- Years active: 1971
- Label: RCA Records
- Past members: James Litherland; Roger Ball; Malcolm Duncan; Bill Harrison; Michael Rosen; John Wetton

Mogul Thrash were an English progressive rock band, active in the early 1970s.

== Biography ==
British jazz-rock band Mogul Thrash evolved from James Litherland's Brotherhood, which in addition to guitarist Litherland (an alumnus of Colosseum who was a founding member of the group in 1969) also featured guitarist/reedist Michael Rosen (previously of Eclection, not the children's poet/author), drummer Bill Harrison and the so-called "Dundee Horns"—saxophonists Roger Ball and Malcolm Duncan. With the addition of singer/bassist John Wetton, formerly of short-lived London band Splinter (not to be confused with the vocal duo from South Shields), the group rechristened itself Mogul Thrash:

There was a TV programme that everybody used to watch on a Saturday night called the Michael Miles Show and he had on it a game called the “Yes No Interlude” where he would ask contestants questions very quickly, and they would have to answer without using either Yes or No. If they did, a man standing next to them would hit a gong and the contestant was out. The late great Spike Milligan had his own show and it was hilarious and the band would watch it every week without fail, sometimes we would be in tears of laughter. He did a sketch of the Michael Miles Show wearing a false nose and called him Mogul Thrash.

Debuting in 1970 with the single "Sleeping in the Kitchen"; their self-titled RCA album appeared the following year, going largely unnoticed at home but finding favor throughout much of Europe. However, faced with legal problems with their management, Mogul Thrash was forced to disband shortly after the record's release; while Wetton went on to join Family and later King Crimson, UK, and Asia, Duncan, Ball and Rosen soon reunited in Average White Band.

Mogul Thrash released just the one album, Mogul Thrash (1971), produced by Brian Auger who also played piano on one of the tracks.

The group were also mentioned in the Half Man Half Biscuit song "The Best Things in Life" from the ACD album.

== Discography ==
=== Albums ===
- Mogul Thrash (1971)

=== Singles ===
- "Sleeping in the Kitchen" / "St. Peter" (1970)
