= Eddie Jobson =

English musician (born 1955)

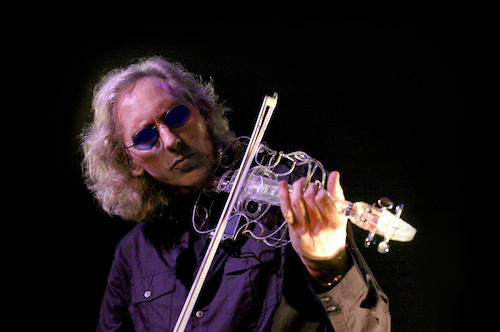
- Jobson performing in 2009

Background information
- Born: Edwin Jobson; 28 April 1955 (age 71); Billingham, England
- Genres: Progressive rock; experimental rock; art rock
- Occupations: Musician; composer; producer
- Instruments: Violin; keyboards; vocals
- Labels: Capitol; EMI; Private; Globe Music
- Member of: UKZ
- Formerly of: Roxy Music; Frank Zappa; U.K.; Jethro Tull
- Website: eddiejobson.com

Edwin Jobson (born 28 April 1955) is an English musician who has been a member of several rock bands including Curved Air, Roxy Music, U.K., and Jethro Tull. He was also part of Frank Zappa's band in 1976–77. Noted for his keyboard work, Jobson has also gained acclaim for his violin playing. He won the Lifetime Achievement Award at the 2017 Progressive Music Awards. In March 2019 Jobson was inducted into the Rock and Roll Hall of Fame as a member of Roxy Music.

== Early years ==
Jobson was born Edwin Jobson in Billingham, Stockton-on-Tees, England, on 28 April 1955. He started to learn piano at age seven, and added violin when he was eight. He received a Diploma of Distinction from the Royal Academy of Music at the same age, and was playing in an orchestra at 12. At 16 he applied to study at the Royal Academy, but was denied a place because of his age, so he joined local band Fat Grapple instead. When he was 17 in 1972, Fat Grapple supported Curved Air, and shortly afterwards Jobson replaced the departing Darryl Way on violin.

The group had some regional success with their 1973 release Air Cut. They toured in Europe but disbanded shortly thereafter. In 2009, previously recorded tapes were released as the Lovechild album, which included two of Jobson's compositions.

== Roxy Music ==
While still in Curved Air, Jobson, who was 16, became acquainted with Roxy Music frontman Bryan Ferry as their sisters shared a room in college. Jobson contributed to Ferry's solo album These Foolish Things, then in 1973 Jobson, 17 years old, replaced Brian Eno in Roxy Music, where he found himself playing three roles: Eno's, Ferry's (who had stepped up as a frontman after initially playing piano), and his own.

Jobson stayed with the band for three studio albums and numerous tours before the band went on an extended hiatus in 1976. He featured on the live Viva! album, particularly on "If There Is Something".

In 1977, he collaborated with Ferry on the composition "As The World Turns". The song's intricate and complex arrangements were tied together by Jobson. This song was released on the B-side of Ferry's solo single "This Is Tomorrow".

Throughout the 1970s, Jobson continued to perform on keyboards and violin for a variety of recording artists, including King Crimson, Phil Manzanera, Andy Mackay, John Entwistle, and Bill Bruford.

== Frank Zappa's band ==
While touring in late 1975, Roxy Music opened for Frank Zappa's band in Milwaukee, Wisconsin. It was at this performance that Jobson and Zappa first met. After the Roxy tour ended, Jobson subsequently spent a week in early 1976 travelling with Zappa's band in Canada, during which time Jobson and Zappa performed a varied repertoire in hotel rooms and backstage at concert venues. Jobson was eventually brought onstage with only minutes' notice to perform what was essentially an audition before thousands of Zappa fans.

Once Roxy Music went on hiatus in 1976, Jobson became heavily sought after. He contemplated an offer to join Procol Harum, but ultimately decided to become a member of Frank Zappa's band. Although Jobson appeared on the cover of the Zoot Allures (1976) album, he did not perform on any of the recorded tracks. In a 1995 interview with Art Rock, Jobson said Zappa always recorded everything himself and whoever was in the band at the time of its release made it onto the album cover: "You may be in the group when it comes out, or maybe you left the band five years before the album comes out. That's how he makes records". Jobson is featured prominently on the live album Zappa in New York released in 1978 but recorded in December 1976 at the Palladium. Other albums featuring recordings with Jobson are Studio Tan, Shut Up 'n Play Yer Guitar, You Can't Do That on Stage Anymore, Vol. 6 and the posthumously released Läther, originally slated to be released in 1977. In 2009, Vaulternative Records, Zappa's label, released the live album Philly '76, recorded at the Spectrum Theater in Philadelphia in October 1976, in which Jobson is featured extensively on keyboards and violin.

== U.K. ==
In 1977, Jobson co-founded the progressive rock supergroup U.K. Initially, the band included former King Crimson members Bill Bruford (drums) and John Wetton (bass and lead vocals), along with guitarist Allan Holdsworth. However, after their debut album, U.K. (1978), and subsequent tour, Bruford and Holdsworth departed to pursue other musical endeavors.

Drummer Terry Bozzio, who knew Jobson from their time together in Zappa's band, was available and thus enlisted to join U.K. The trio released two additional albums, Danger Money (1979) and a live concert production Night After Night (1979), and embarked on a successful tour before U.K. disbanded in 1980.

== Jethro Tull: A Tour ==
Jobson was asked to participate on Jethro Tull frontman Ian Anderson's solo endeavour, which was eventually released by Chrysalis Records in 1980 as a full-fledged Tull album, A. Jobson, credited as a special guest, performed on keyboards and electric violin, and was cited in liner notes as providing additional musical material. He remained with the band for their subsequent world tour in 1980–1981.

Jobson reunited twice with the band in the subsequent years. He played keyboards and violin on their only 1985 concert, in place of Jethro Tull's then keyboard player Peter-John Vettese, at International Congress Centrum in Berlin, to celebrate Johann Sebastian Bach's 300th birthday. Jobson was heavily featured on the band's performance of Bach's "Double Violin Concerto". He has also appeared as a surprise guest for the band's concert in East Rutherford, New Jersey, in November 1989.

== Yes ==
Jobson was briefly a member of Yes in 1983 after the departure of keyboardist Tony Kaye. Jobson neither recorded nor performed live with Yes. His only official appearances with the band were in promotional photographs, and in the video for "Owner of a Lonely Heart", but the video was released after Kaye had rejoined and Jobson had departed. This resulted in Jobson appearing (though edited out as much as possible) in the original version of the song's video. Jobson has stated on his website that he was asked to replace Kaye, and was hesitant to do so until after hearing the band's new release, and then rehearsing with the band in London. He returned to his home in the US as a full member of Yes, and set forth learning the band's repertoire. However, several weeks later he received a call from the band's management advising that Kaye was back in the group and the two would be sharing keyboard duties. Jobson declined, and left the band.

== Solo career ==
In 1983 Capitol Records/EMI released Jobson's solo effort, The Green Album. Half of the original compositions were performed in a band-style format using session musicians on drums, bass, and guitars, while the other half are instrumentals performed by Jobson without accompaniment (save bass on one track). Vocals, keyboards, and electric violin were performed by Jobson.

Two years later, Jobson made a significant genre shift from progressive rock music to the stylings of new age with Theme of Secrets. This 1985 release by new-age record label Private Music, was recorded solely using Synclavier and samples. That same year he also composed and performed three piano compositions on the label's compilation album Piano One.

== Scoring for film and television ==
Throughout the 1980s and 1990s Jobson also built a successful career as a composer of TV and film soundtracks. He scored nearly 100 episodes of the TV series Nash Bridges (1996–2001). He served as choral music arranger for two 2003 Walt Disney Pictures releases, The Haunted Mansion and Brother Bear.

Jobson also composed music for the world of advertising, most notably the Amtrak "California Zephyr" commercial that featured Richie Havens singing "There's Something About a Train That's Magic". For his scoring and music direction on this effort, Jobson won the Clio Award for original music scoring in 1988. He continued to receive Clio Award accolades as either a winner or finalist for a number of years running.

== Globe Music Media Arts ==
In 2000, Jobson started his own label, Globe Music Media Arts, where he produced/distributed a variety of what he termed "an amalgamation of other somewhat more cultured musical styles", most notably the Bulgarian Women Choir's 2000 album Voices of Life. In addition to production duties, he also contributed three new compositions (originally slated for the perpetually in-progress U.K. reunion project called Legacy), and playing violin on two of the new pieces. In 2010 he launched the Zealots Lounge, a subscription-based fan club offering free downloads, VIP concert tickets and private Zealots Lounge events around the world. Jobson has likened those who participate in this programme to "modern-day patrons of the arts".

== UKZ ==
In October 2007, Jobson announced the formation of a new band, UKZ, with Trey Gunn, Marco Minnemann, Alex Machacek, and Aaron Lippert. Their EP, Radiation, became available from the Globe Music online store in January 2009 and had its official release on Glo Digital in March 2009; a 7:48 video of the title track was released earlier, appearing on YouTube in January 2009. The band's first live performance was held at Town Hall in New York City on 24 January 2009. A few months later in June, UKZ also performed four dates in Japan in the cities of Tokyo, Nagoya, and Osaka. Additionally, on 9 August 2009, Jobson did a one-off reunion gig with Curved Air in Chislehurst, Kent.

In November 2009, Jobson reunited with his former Roxy Music and U.K. bandmate John Wetton for what was termed "The 30th Anniversary of U.K.", with three performances in Poland (Kraków, Warsaw and Bydgoszcz).

== Return to live performance ==
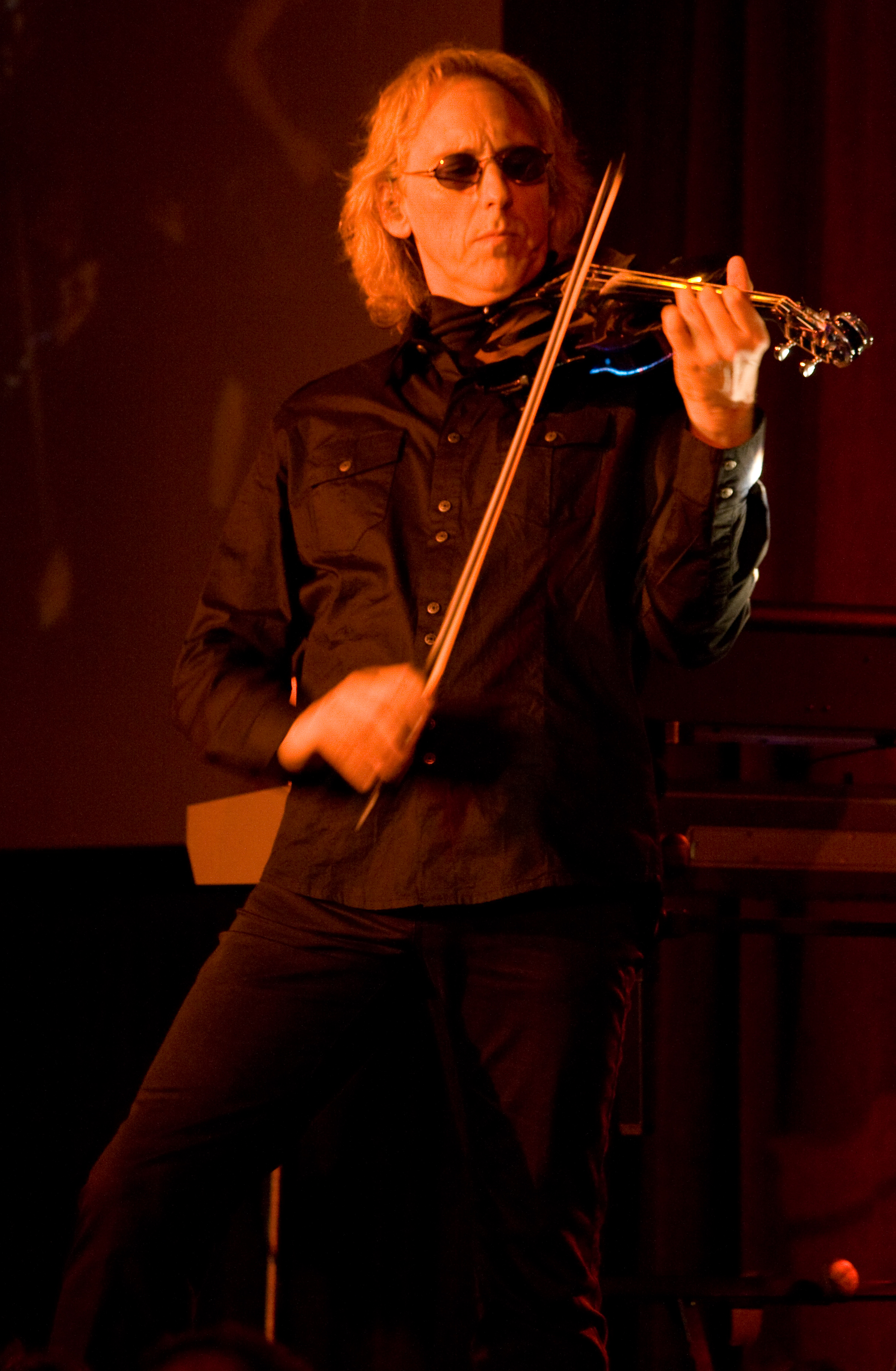
Jobson with UKZ – BB King Blues Club, NYC, 20 August 2009

The Creation of Peace Festival in Kazan, Tatarstan on 30 August 2008 saw Jobson's return to the stage after more than two decades. He played violin on one song with the Patti Smith Group, one song with Fairport Convention, and two songs ("Red" and "Larks' Tongues in Aspic, Part 2") with the Crimson ProjeKCt. In addition to joining this collection of musicians, Jobson also performed piano and violin solos at the B1 club in Moscow.

During 2009, Jobson also created an adjunct performing group, the 'U-Z Project', which featured a revolving line-up of guest musicians; these ensembles continue to perform at live concerts throughout North and Central America, Europe, and Japan. Participating musicians have included John Wetton, Alex Machacek, Marc Bonilla, and drummers Marco Minnemann, Mike Mangini, Virgil Donati, Gary Husband, and Simon Phillips.

In January 2010, Jobson was named to the technical advisory board of Austin, Texas based keyboard manufacturer, Infinite Response. He was involved in the development of the company's VAX77 folding MIDI keyboard controller, which Jobson showcased at the January 2010 NAMM Show in Anaheim, California. Jobson's U-Z Project headlined NEARfest in Bethlehem, Pennsylvania on 20 June 2010. A live CD compiled from various U-Z performances in 2009 was released as Ultimate Zero – The Best of the U-Z Project Live in Japan in November 2010.

In January 2011, Jobson gave a series of "master classes" in Japan, featuring performances of compositions throughout his career and lecture-style discussions of his music. In April of that year, a Jobson-Wetton "U.K." reunion tour provided performances in Japan and the US, with Alex Machacek (guitar) and Marco Minnemann (drums) completing the four-piece line-up. Jobson headlined the 2011 Zappanale festival on 21 August in Bad Doberan, Germany, and played an earlier gig in Zoetermeer, Netherlands on 19 August, with a U-Z project line-up of Marc Bonilla (vocals/bass), Alex Machacek (guitar) and Marco Minnemann (drums).

In early 2012, Jobson confirmed that he re-formed the U.K. trio line-up — Jobson, John Wetton, and Terry Bozzio — for a one-off world tour, which took place from May to June 2012, with the trio playing dates in North America and Japan. However, Bozzio did not join the additional summer concert dates in Europe, where drummer Gary Husband assumed that role. Alex Machacek (guitar) was also added to the band line-up. Jobson, Wetton, Machacek, and Husband also headlined at NEARfest Apocalypse in Bethlehem, Pennsylvania. Additionally, the trio of Jobson, Wetton, and Bozzio extended its performances with a March 2013 stint on the inaugural voyage of the progressive rock Cruise to the Edge excursion, where they headlined with Yes and Steve Hackett.

Jobson marked the fortieth anniversary of the start of his professional music career with a short tour in Japan during November 2013. Joining him onstage was an ensemble of musicians from his career, including John Wetton, Sonja Kristina, Alex Machacek, Marco Minnemann, Aaron Lippert, and Ric Fierabracci. He performed songs which spanned the four decades, including music from Curved Air, Roxy Music, U.K., UKZ, and his solo efforts, to sold-out venues in Tokyo and Osaka.

In April 2017, Jobson and Marc Bonilla began the Fallen Angels Tour, a tribute to the music of John Wetton and Keith Emerson, commencing at London's Under The Bridge venue at Stamford Bridge Stadium on 22 April.

== Rock and Roll Hall of Fame ==
On the 29 of April 2019, in what he referred to as "his final performance", Jobson reunited with Roxy Music at the Barclays Center in Brooklyn, New York, for the 2019 Rock and Roll Hall of Fame induction ceremony. Jobson performed three songs with the band, including "Out of the Blue", featuring his trademark Plexiglas violin used on the original violin solo. Jobson is the only violinist inducted into the Rock and Roll Hall of Fame.

== Discography ==
Year	Band	Title	Notes
1973	Curved Air	Air Cut	
1973	Roxy Music	Stranded	
1974	Roxy Music	Country Life	
1975	Roxy Music	Siren	
1976	Roxy Music	Viva!	
1976	Eddie Jobson	"Yesterday Boulevard" b/w "On a Still Night"	Single (Island WIP-6287)
1978	Frank Zappa	Zappa in New York	Recorded 26–29 December 1976
1978	U.K.	U.K.	
1979	U.K.	Danger Money	
1979	U.K.	Night After Night	
1999	U.K.	Concert Classics, Vol. 4	Recorded 11 July 1978
1980	Jethro Tull	A	
1983	Eddie Jobson	The Green Album	Eddie Jobson / Zinc
1985	Eddie Jobson	Theme of Secrets	
1990	Curved Air	Lovechild	Recorded July 1973
2000	The Bulgarian Women's Choir—Angelite	Voices of Life	
2009	UKZ	Radiation	
2009	Frank Zappa	Philly '76	Recorded 29 October 1976
2010	Eddie Jobson	Ultimate Zero Tour - Live	Live album
2013	U.K.	Reunion – Live in Tokyo	CD&DVD
2015	U.K.	Curtain Call	Recorded 2013
2015	Eddie Jobson	Four Decades	Live album, recorded 2013
2018	Eddie Jobson	1971–1979 The Band Years	Compilation album
2019	Frank Zappa	Zappa In New York 40th Anniversary Deluxe Edition	Recorded 26–29 December 1976
2022	Frank Zappa	Zappa/Erie	Recorded 10–13 November 1976

=== Session work and collaborations ===
with Bryan Ferry

- These Foolish Things (1973)
- Let's Stick Together (1976)

with Andy Mackay

- In Search of Eddie Riff (1974)

with Roger Glover

- The Butterfly Ball and the Grasshopper's Feast (1974)

with Amazing Blondel

- Mulgrave Street (1974)

with John Entwistle

- Mad Dog (1975)

with Phil Manzanera

- Diamond Head (1975)
- Listen Now (1977)
- Guitarissimo (compilation) (1986)

with King Crimson

- USA (1975)

with Bill Bruford

- One of a Kind (1979) (violin on "Forever Until Sunday")

with John Wetton

- Raised in Captivity (2011) (violin on "The Devil and the Opera House")

with Chris Jobson

- Wish You Well (2025) (produced and guested on keys)
