= Danger Money =

Studio album by U.K.
- Released: 16 March 1979
- Recorded: November 1978 – January 1979
- Studios: AIR Studios, London, UK
- Genre: Progressive rock
- Length: 42:04
- Label: E.G./Polydor Records
- Producers: Eddie Jobson, John Wetton

U.K. chronology
U.K. (1978)	Danger Money (1979)	Night After Night (1979)

Singles from Danger Money
- 1. "Rendezvous 6:02" Released: May 1979 (EU); 2. "Nothing to Lose" Released: June 1979 (UK)

Professional ratings
Review scores
Source	Rating
Allmusic	3/5 stars

Danger Money is the second and final studio album by the progressive rock supergroup U.K., featuring John Wetton, Eddie Jobson and Terry Bozzio. It was released by E.G. Records / Polydor in the United Kingdom on 16 March 1979.

Early versions of "The Only Thing She Needs", "Caesar's Palace Blues" and "Carrying No Cross" (which had the opening chords to "Danger Money" in its intro) had been performed on tour throughout 1978 by the band's original line-up with Bill Bruford and Allan Holdsworth. "Rendezvous 6:02" and "Nothing to Lose" were both edited for single release.

The album was remastered in 2016 and included as part of the box-set Ultimate Collector's Edition.

== Writing ==
John Wetton recalled of "Nothing to Lose" that "I [came] in with the bulk of it, [Eddie Jobson] rearranged two verses, and then I wrote the lyrics."

== Recording ==
According to Eddie Jobson, the CS80 solo on "Rendezvous 6:02" was played with all 16 of the instrument's oscillators in monophonic unison.

== Track listing ==
All tracks are written by Eddie Jobson and John Wetton.

Side one
No.	Title	Length
1.	"Danger Money"	8:12
2.	"Rendezvous 6:02"	5:00
3.	"The Only Thing She Needs"	7:53

Side two
No.	Title	Length
1.	"Caesar's Palace Blues"	4:42
2.	"Nothing to Lose"	3:57
3.	"Carrying No Cross"	12:20

== Personnel ==
U.K.

- Eddie Jobson – keyboards, electric violin
- John Wetton – bass, lead and backing vocals
- Terry Bozzio – drums, percussion

== Singles ==
- "Nothing to Lose"/ "In the Dead of Night" (Re-recorded version) (UK #67)
- "Rendezvous 6:02" /"In the Dead of Night" (Original version) (NL #30) (released in Europe)

== Charts ==
Chart (1979)	Peak position
Canada Top Albums/CDs (RPM)	63
Dutch Albums (Album Top 100)	37
US Billboard 200	45
