= John Wetton =

English musician (1949–2017)

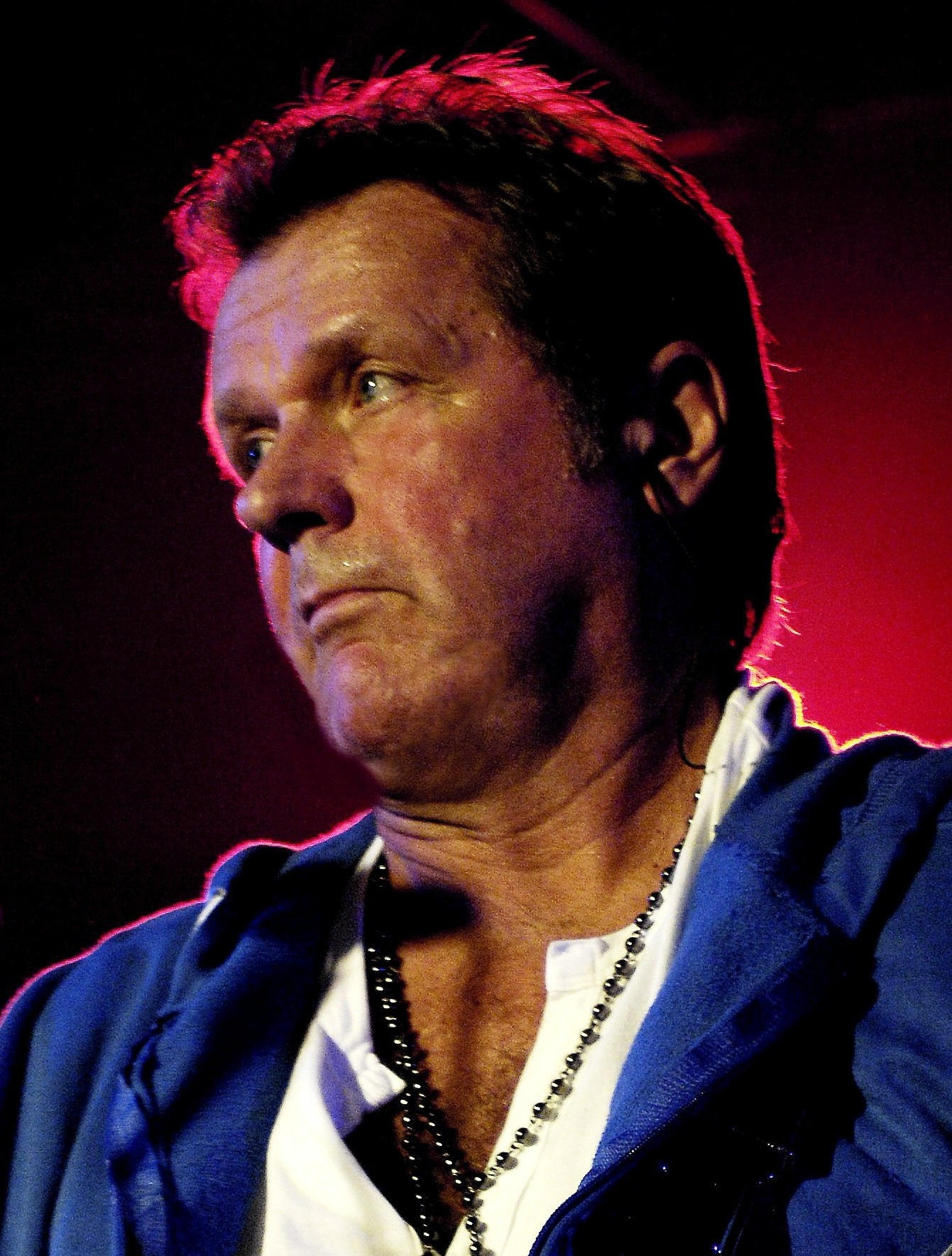

Background information
- Born: John Kenneth Wetton; 12 June 1949; Willington, Derbyshire, England
- Origin: Bournemouth, Dorset, England
- Died: 31 January 2017 (aged 67) Bournemouth, Dorset, England
- Genres: Progressive rock; hard rock; pop rock; jazz fusion
- Occupations: Musician; singer; songwriter; producer
- Instruments: Bass; vocals; guitar; keyboards
- Years active: 1965–2017
- Labels: E.G.; Atlantic; Geffen; Universal; Island; Eagle; Avalon; EMI; King Records; Frontiers
- Formerly of: The Corvettes; the Palmer-James Group; Tetrad; Ginger Man; Mogul Thrash; Renaissance; Family; King Crimson; Roxy Music; Uriah Heep; U.K.; Jack-Knife; Wishbone Ash; Steve Hackett Band; Asia; Qango

John Kenneth Wetton (12 June 1949 – 31 January 2017) was an English musician, singer, and songwriter. He was known for his bass playing as well as his baritone voice. In 1971, he was a member of the rock band Family for a short time, before joining King Crimson in 1972. After the breakup of King Crimson at the end of 1974, he played in a number of other bands, including Roxy Music (1974–1975), Uriah Heep (1975–1976), U.K. (1977–1980), and Wishbone Ash (1980–1981).

In 1981, Wetton co-founded the supergroup Asia as lead vocalist and principal songwriter. Their self-titled debut album was released in 1982, selling ten million copies worldwide and becoming Billboard magazine's number one album of 1982. He later formed the duo Icon with his Asia bandmate and songwriting partner Geoff Downes and also had a successful solo career.

== Life and career ==
=== Early life and musical beginnings ===
Wetton was born in Willington, Derbyshire, and grew up in Bournemouth, Dorset, where he attended Bournemouth School. His elder brother Robert was a classical organist and choirmaster. While practising organ, Robert would have John play the bass parts on a piano, since their home organ did not have a pedalboard. John recalled that during the practices, "I got to like bass lines, because Bach bass lines are incredibly interesting. So I thought, this is good, I like bass lines, that's me." Though an enthusiast of classical music since childhood, he decided to explore rock music instead in order to avoid being compared to his brother. He played bass and sang in a number of bands with Richard Palmer-James, including the Corvettes, the Palmer-James Group, Tetrad, and Ginger Man. A key early band he was in was the jazzy Mogul Thrash. After live work with Renaissance, he joined Family and also featured in various recording sessions. He has credited J.S. Bach, Brian Wilson, Paul McCartney, James Jamerson, Jack Bruce, Ace Kefford, Chris Squire, John Entwistle, Harvey Brooks, Ron Carter, and Miroslav Vitouš as musical influences.

=== King Crimson ===
In late 1972, Wetton's fellow Dorset native Robert Fripp invited him to join King Crimson. The band's lineup also included violinist David Cross, former Yes drummer Bill Bruford, and percussionist Jamie Muir. Wetton also gained experience as the lead singer and songwriter. His friend Palmer-James also worked with the band as their primary lyricist. Wetton remained with King Crimson until Fripp unexpectedly disbanded the group in 1974.

After the dissolution of King Crimson, Wetton continued to work on various projects, including a tour with Roxy Music and two albums with Uriah Heep, for whom he occasionally provided vocals as well as bass parts—examples of his vocal style can be heard on the 1976 album High and Mighty. While still with King Crimson, Wetton had been asked by Roxy Music to sit in on their auditions for a replacement bass player and give his recommendations. Dissatisfied with all the applicants, he offered to do the 1975 tour with the group himself so as to give them time to find a good bassist. In 1977, after failed attempts to reunite King Crimson and to create a new band with Rick Wakeman, Wetton formed U.K. with Bill Bruford. Wetton recruited Curved Air and Roxy Music keyboardist/violinist Eddie Jobson; Bruford brought in guitarist Allan Holdsworth from his solo group.

=== First solo music; Asia ===
After U.K.'s breakup in 1980, Wetton released his first solo album, Caught in the Crossfire, also in 1980. Later that year, he had a brief stint with Wishbone Ash, appearing on their 1981 album, Number the Brave. In late 1981, he had a meeting with Geffen Records' president John Kalodner, who took him to task for playing bass in Bryan Ferry's backing band, feeling he should be fronting a group himself. At Kalodner's insistence, Wetton started writing with former Yes guitarist Steve Howe, with a view to forming their own band. Joined by keyboardist Geoff Downes and drummer Carl Palmer (of Emerson, Lake & Palmer), the band became Asia. Their self-titled debut album sold over ten million copies worldwide, making them a household name. Wetton worked with Asia until 1983, when he was fired (at the insistence of Geffen Records) for then-unknown reasons, but at least in part due to lower-than-expected sales of 1983's Alpha. He returned to Asia in 1985 (with Mandy Meyer replacing Steve Howe on guitar), completing the band's third album, Astra.

In 1986, a collaboration between Wetton and Roxy Music guitarist Phil Manzanera was released as Wetton/Manzanera. Around that time, Wetton began working with Downes and Palmer to restart Asia. Some of the material they recorded was featured on 1990's Then & Now, including the radio hit "Days Like These".

=== Return to solo work ===
In the 1990s, Wetton focused on his solo career and collaborations. He featured on the Phil Manzanera solo album Southern Cross, released in 1990. In 1995, he released his second solo album, Battlelines, which had previously been issued as Voicemail (1994) in Japan only.

In 1999, an aborted attempt to reform Asia resulted in Wetton and Palmer forming a short-lived progressive group dubbed Qango, with John Young and Dave Kilminster. Qango performed several shows in the UK and recorded a live album, Live in the Hood, before disbanding.

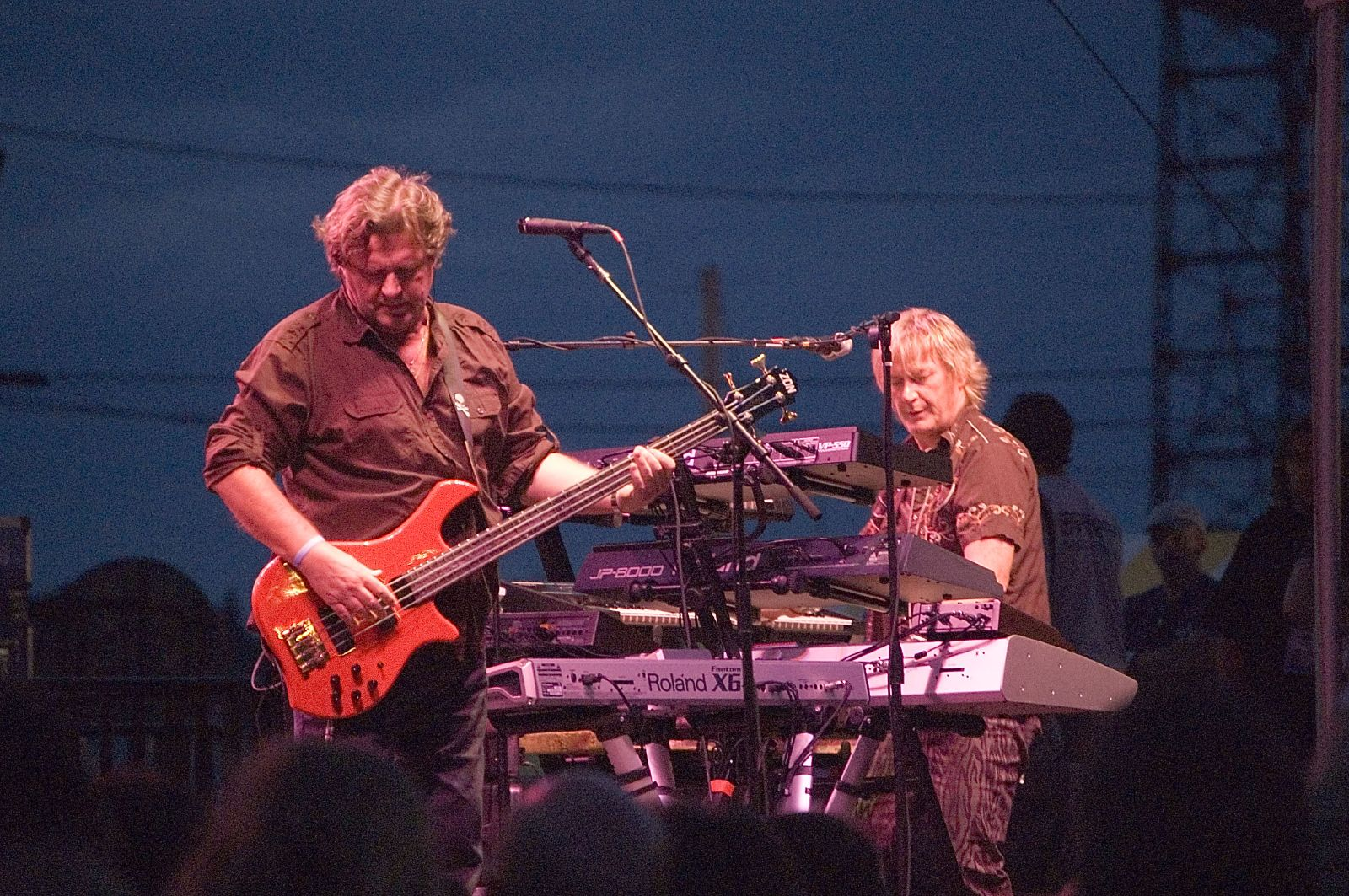
John Wetton (left) and Geoff Downes performing in 2005

In the early 2000s, Wetton reunited with Downes, and the duo released several albums. In 2006, a reunion of the original Asia lineup (Wetton, Downes, Howe, Palmer) finally occurred. A studio album titled Phoenix, the original band's first since 1983's Alpha, was released in April 2008 and peaked at No. 73 on the Billboard 200 albums chart in the United States. They issued two more studio albums, Omega (2010) and XXX (2012), before Howe departed in January 2013 to focus on Yes. With new guitarist Sam Coulson, Asia released Gravitas in March 2014.

In 2013, Wetton guested on the album Grandine il vento by Renaissance, with whom he had played live 42 years before. In the same year, he toured with American Idol finalist Leslie Hunt's group District 97, based in Chicago, to commemorate the 40th anniversary of the King Crimson album Larks' Tongues in Aspic.

Wetton also worked extensively as a session musician with artists including Brian Eno (appearing on Here Come the Warm Jets), Bryan Ferry, and Ayreon.

== Death ==
Wetton died in his sleep from complications of colorectal cancer at the Macmillan Unit of Christchurch Hospital in Christchurch, Dorset, on 31 January 2017, at the age of 67. He was surrounded by his wife, son, brother, and mother.

Geoff Downes said: "It is with great sadness and a heavy heart that I have to report we have lost my dearest friend, brother, bandmate and long term musical collaborator [...] He will be remembered as one of the world's finest musical talents, and I for one of many was wholly blessed by his influence [...] Life will not be the same without him. And words are not really enough to describe the loss I feel right now.

Billy Sherwood, who was Wetton's producer, co-songwriter, and co-performer on his 2011 solo album, Raised in Captivity, replaced him in Asia. On 17 June 2017, Asia performed a special concert in Wetton's memory, titled An Extraordinary Life (full title: An Extraordinary Life – An Interactive Celebration of the Life & Music of John Wetton), in reference to the eponymous song from the 2008 Asia album, Phoenix; fan-submitted performances were shown on a large video screen above the stage. Some King Crimson songs were also performed at the event.

Asteroid 72802 Wetton, discovered by Marc Buie at Kitt Peak National Observatory in Arizona in 2001, was named in his memory. The official naming citation was published by the Minor Planet Center on 18 May 2019 (M.P.C. 114955).

== Influence ==
Artists who have cited Wetton as an influence or have expressed their admiration for him include Billy Sheehan, Juan Alderete of the Mars Volta and Racer X, Michael Sweet of Stryper, Ron Anderson, Kevin Feazey of the Fierce and the Dead, and Joseph D. Rowland of Pallbearer. After Wetton's death, Eric Clapton published a short instrumental tribute entitled "For John W."

== Band timeline ==
- Mogul Thrash (1971)
- Gordon Haskell (1971)
- Family (1971–1972)
- Larry Norman (1972)
- King Crimson (1972–1974)
- Roxy Music (1974–1975)
- Uriah Heep (1975–1976)
- Bryan Ferry (1976–1977)
- U.K. (1977–1980; 2011–2015)
- Jack-Knife (1979)
- Wishbone Ash (1980)
- Solo (1980–2017, his death)
- Asia (1981–1983; 1984–1986; 1989–1991; 2006–2017, his death)
- Qango (1999–2000)
- Wetton Downes (2002; 2005–2009)

== Discography ==
=== Solo ===
Studio albums

| Year | Title | Label |
|---|---|---|
| 1980 | Caught in the Crossfire | E'G / Polydor Records |
| 1988 | Chasing the Deer (soundtrack EP) | Blueprint |
| 1994 | Voice Mail / Battle Lines | Pony Canyon / Magnetic Air Records |
| 1997 | Arkangel | Eagle Records |
| 2000 | Welcome to Heaven / Sinister | Avalon Records |
| 2003 | Rock of Faith | Giant Electric Pea |
| 2011 | Raised in Captivity | Frontiers Records |

Live albums

| Year | Title | Label |
|---|---|---|
| 1995 | Chasing the Dragon (Live in Japan) | Eclipse Records |
| 1996 | Akustika: Live in America | Blueprint |
| 1998 | Live in Tokyo 1997 | Blueprint |
| 1998 | Hazy Monet (Live in New York City USA, 27 May 1997) | Blueprint |
| 1999 | Nomansland (Live in Poland) | Giant Electric Pea |
| 1999 | Sub Rosa (Live in Milan 5 July 1998) | Blueprint |
| 2000 | Live at the Sun Plaza Tokyo 1999 | Blueprint |
| 2002 | One Way or Another (with Ken Hensley) | Classic Rock Legends |
| 2002 | More Than Conquerors (with Ken Hensley) (CD/DVD) | Classic Rock Legends |
| 2003 | Live in Argentina 1996 | Trade Mark of Official Quality |
| 2003 | Live in Stockholm 1998 | Blueprint |
| 2003 | Live in Osaka 1997 | Trade Mark of Official Quality |
| 2003 | Live in the Underworld (CD & DVD) | Classic Rock Legends |
| 2004 | Amata | Metal Mind Records |
| 2004 | Agenda | Metal Mind Records |
| 2009 | Amorata (DVD) | Metal Mind Records |
| 2014 | One More Red Night – Live in Chicago (with District 97) | Primary Purpose |
| 2015 | Live via Satellite | Primary Purpose |
| 2015 | New York Minute (with Les Paul Trio) | Primary Purpose |
| 2024 | Concentus – The John Wetton Live Collection Volume One | Primary Purpose |
| 2025 | Concentus II – The John Wetton Live Collection Volume Two | Primary Purpose |

Compilations

| Year | Title | Label |
|---|---|---|
| 1987 | King's Road, 1972–1980 | E'G / Virgin Records |
| 2001 | Anthology | NMC |
| 2002 | ...Caught in the Crossfire... | Digimode Entertainment UK (Note: Not to be confused with Wetton's 1980 debut solo album. 17 tracks from various Wetton projects, including Wetton/Manzanera (1987) and Battle Lines (1994).) |
| 2015 | The Studio Recordings Anthology | |
| 2023 | John Wetton an Extraordinary Life – The Solo Albums | Spirit of Unicorn Music |

=== Collaborations ===
| Year | Title | Label |
|---|---|---|
| 1987 | Wetton/Manzanera (with Phil Manzanera) | Geffen Records |
| 1998 | Monkey Business 1972–1997 (with Richard Palmer-James) | Blueprint |

=== As band member ===
| Years | Bands | Titles | Notes |
|---|---|---|---|
| 1971 | Mogul Thrash | Mogul Thrash | |
| 1971 | Family | Fearless | UK No. 14, US No. 177 |
| 1972 | Family | Bandstand | UK No. 15, US No. 183 |
| 1973 | King Crimson | Larks' Tongues in Aspic | UK No. 20, US No. 61 |
| 1974 | King Crimson | Starless and Bible Black | UK No. 28, US No. 64 |
| 1974 | King Crimson | Red | UK No. 45, US No. 66 |
| 1975 | King Crimson | USA | Live, recorded June 1974 |
| 1992 | King Crimson | The Great Deceiver | Live, recorded 1973–1974 |
| 1997 | King Crimson | The Night Watch | Live, recorded 23 November 1973 |
| 2012 | King Crimson | Larks' Tongues in Aspic (box set) | |
| 2013 | King Crimson | The Road to Red (box set) | |
| 2014 | King Crimson | Starless (box set) | |
| 1975 | Uriah Heep | Return to Fantasy | UK No. 7, US No. 85 |
| 1976 | Uriah Heep | High and Mighty | UK No. 56, US No. 161 |
| 1976 | Roxy Music | Viva! | UK No. 6, US No. 81 |
| 1978 | U.K. | U.K. | UK No. 43 |
| 1979 | U.K. | Danger Money | US No. 45 |
| 1979 | U.K. | Night After Night | US No. 109 |
| 1999 | U.K. | Concert Classics, Vol. 4 | Live, recorded 1978 |
| 2013 | U.K. | Reunion – Live in Tokyo | Live CD & DVD, recorded 2011 |
| 2015 | U.K. | Curtain Call | Live CD & DVD, recorded 2013 |
| 2016 | U.K. | UK: Ultimate Collector's Edition' | |
| 1979 | Jack-Knife | I Wish You Would | (Note: Jack-Knife was a project in which John Wetton and his Tetrad bandmate W.J. Hutcheson visited Richard Palmer-James at his home in Munich, Germany. As Jack-Knife, they recorded an album with German drummer Curt Cress, titled I Wish You Would.) |
| 1981 | Wishbone Ash | Number the Brave | UK No. 61 |
| 1982 | Asia | Asia | UK No. 11, US No. 1 |
| 1983 | Asia | Alpha | UK No. 5, US No. 6 |
| 1985 | Asia | Astra | UK No. 68, US No. 67 |
| 1990 | Asia | Then & Now | US No. 114 |
| 1991 | Asia | Live in Moscow 1990 | Live |
| 2007 | Asia | Fantasia: Live in Tokyo | Live |
| 2008 | Asia | Phoenix | US No. 73 |
| 2010 | Asia | Spirit of the Night – Live in Cambridge 2009 | Live |
| 2010 | Asia | Omega | |
| 2012 | Asia | Resonance – The Omega Tour 2010 | Live, recorded 2010 |
| 2012 | Asia | XXX | US No. 134 |
| 2014 | Asia | High Voltage – Live | Live, recorded 2010 |
| 2014 | Asia | Gravitas | US No. 159 |
| 2015 | Asia | Axis XXX Live San Francisco | Live, recorded 2012 |
| 2017 | Asia | Symfonia: Live in Bulgaria 2013 | Live, recorded 2013 |
| 2000 | Qango | Live in the Hood | Live |
| 2002 | Wetton/Downes | Wetton Downes/Icon Zero (2017 reissue) | Stallion Records/Epicon Records (2017 reissue) |
| 2005 | Wetton/Downes | Icon | Frontiers Records/UMe Digital (US) |
| 2005 | Wetton/Downes | Heat of the Moment '05 EP | Frontiers Records |
| 2006 | Wetton/Downes | Icon II: Rubicon | Frontiers Records |
| 2006 | Wetton/Downes | Icon Live: Never in a Million Years | Frontiers Records |
| 2006 | Wetton/Downes | Icon: Acoustic TV Broadcast | Frontiers Records (also released as DVD) |
| 2009 | Wetton/Downes | Icon 3 | Frontiers Records |
| 2009 | Wetton/Downes | Icon: Urban Psalm | Live CD & DVD, Asia Icon Ltd. |
| 2012 | Wetton/Downes | Icon: Heat of the Rising Sun | Live, the Store for Music |

=== Session work ===
with Edwards Hand

- Stranded (1970) produced by George Martin, Wetton played bass on all tracks

with Gordon Haskell

- It Is and It Isn't (1971) Wetton plays organ, bass, keyboards, vocals, classical guitar, and vocal harmony.

with Larry Norman

- Only Visiting This Planet (1972) Bass on whole album

with Rare Bird

- Somebody's Watching (1973) The final track "Dollars" includes extracts from "A Few Dollars More" and features Wetton (credited as John Whetton) on bass

with Malcolm and Alwyn

- Fool's Wisdom (1973)

with Peter Banks

- Two Sides of Peter Banks (1973): Wetton plays bass on track 5 ("Knights") with album covers crediting "John Whetton"

with Brian Eno

- Here Come the Warm Jets (1973): Wetton plays bass on track 3 ("Baby's on Fire") and track 5 ("Driving Me Backwards")

with Peter Sinfield

- Still (1973) Also with Greg Lake, Gordon Haskell, Mel Collins, etc.

with Bryan Ferry

- Another Time, Another Place (1974)
- Let's Stick Together (1976)
- In Your Mind (1977)
- The Bride Stripped Bare (1978)
- Live at the Royal Albert Hall 1974 (2020)

with Phil Manzanera

- Diamond Head (1975)
- K-Scope (1978)
- "Round in Circles" / "Talk to Me" (singles) (Limited Edition vinyl) (2020)

with Duncan Mackay

- Score (1977)

with Atoll

- Rock Puzzle (1979)

with Roger Chapman

- Mail Order Magic (1980)
- Hyenas Only Laugh for Fun (1981)

with Phenomena

- "Did It All for Love" (single) (1987)

with David Cross

- Exiles (1997)

with Steve Hackett

- Genesis Revisited (1997): Wetton sings on tracks 1 ("Watcher of the Skies") and 5 ("Firth of Fifth") and also plays bass on track 5.
- The Tokyo Tapes (1998)
- Genesis Revisited II (2012): Wetton sings and plays guitar and bass on the track "Afterglow".
- Genesis Revisited: Live at Hammersmith (2013): Wetton sings on the track "Afterglow".
- Genesis Revisited: Live at the Royal Albert Hall (2014): Wetton sings on the track "Firth of Fifth".

with Martin Orford

- Classical Music and Popular Songs (2000): Wetton sings lead vocals on track 2 ("A Part of Me").
- The Old Road (2008): Wetton sings lead vocals on tracks 4 ("Take It to the Sun") and 8 ("The Time and the Season") and plays bass on tracks 4 and 6 ("The Old Road").

with Galahad

- Year Zero (2002): joint lead vocals on "Belt Up" and "Take a Deep Breath and Hold on Tight"

with Daniele Liverani

- Genius A Rock Opera – Episode 1 (2002)

with Billy Sherwood

- Back Against the Wall (2005): Wetton sings lead vocals on "Mother" and "Hey You".
- Return to the Dark Side of the Moon (2006): Wetton sings lead vocals on "Us and Them".

with Martin Turner's Wishbone Ash

- Argus Through the Looking Glass (2008)

with Alan Simon

- Excalibur II: The Celtic Ring
- Excalibur III

with Eddie Jobson

- Ultimate Zero – The Best of the U-Z Project Live (2010)
- Four Decades (2015)

with Ayreon

- The Theory of Everything (2013) : Rick Wakeman, Keith Emerson, and Steve Hackett also play on this album.

with Renaissance

- Grandine il vento (2013)

=== Writing ===
with David Cassidy

- David Cassidy (1990)
