= U.K. (band) =

British progressive rock supergroup

- U.K., 1978. L-R: John Wetton, Allan Holdsworth, Bill Bruford, and Eddie Jobson.

Background information
- Origin: England
- Genres: Progressive rock; art rock
- Years active: 1977–1980, 2011–2015
- Labels: E.G.; Polydor; Virgin
- Spinoffs: UKZ; HoBoLeMa
- Spinoff of: King Crimson; Roxy Music
- Past members: Eddie Jobson; John Wetton; Allan Holdsworth; Bill Bruford; Terry Bozzio

U.K. were a British progressive rock supergroup originally active from 1977 to 1980. The band was founded by bass guitarist John Wetton and drummer Bill Bruford, formerly the rhythm section of King Crimson. The band was rounded out by violinist/keyboardist Eddie Jobson, and guitarist Allan Holdsworth. Bruford and Holdsworth left in 1978, and Bruford was replaced by drummer Terry Bozzio. Jobson, Wetton and Bozzio reformed U.K. for a world tour in 2012.

== History ==
=== Formation and first album ===
In 1972, John Wetton (formerly of Family) and Bill Bruford (formerly of Yes) both joined King Crimson, recording three albums before guitarist Robert Fripp disbanded the group at the end of 1974. Wetton then spent a brief time with Roxy Music, who also included Eddie Jobson, before joining Uriah Heep for two albums. In July 1976, after leaving Uriah Heep, Wetton reconnected with Bruford, recording demos originally proposed for a Wetton solo album (two of these demos were later released on the compilation Monkey Business in 1998). In September 1976, they formed a band with keyboardist Rick Wakeman, who had previously worked with Bruford in Yes. The project was stopped after rehearsals, by Wakeman's label. According to Bruford, "A&M Records were unwilling to let their 'star', Wakeman, walk off with a used, slightly soiled King Crimson rhythm section, and the idea failed".

Bruford and Wetton next approached Robert Fripp to reform King Crimson. When Fripp eventually declined, Bruford and Wetton decided that each would choose a musician in order to form a new band. Wetton brought in Eddie Jobson, who since leaving Roxy Music in 1976 had joined Frank Zappa's band, thus "stealing" him from Zappa. Bruford recruited Allan Holdsworth (formerly of Soft Machine, Nucleus, Gong, Tempest and The Tony Williams Lifetime) who had played on Bruford's debut solo album, Feels Good to Me (1978).

The band's formation coincided with the introduction of the Yamaha CS-80 synthesizer, and this instrument became an integral part of their developing sound.

U.K. released their self-titled debut album in 1978 and followed it with a supporting tour. Following two lengthy American tours (June to October 1978), Wetton and Jobson decided to fire Holdsworth over musical differences, and since Bruford had indicated to Wetton that he would favour Holdsworth’s more improvisational approach in the event of a disagreement on the direction of the band, they lined up Terry Bozzio (another former Zappa band member) to replace Bruford. Bruford took several instrumentals with him that he had developed for the live U.K. repertoire ("Forever Until Sunday", "Sahara of Snow”), that he instead recorded with his solo band Bruford on his second album One of a Kind (1979).

=== Trio line-up ===
U.K. attempted unsuccessfully to find another guitarist, notably auditioning a then-unknown Steve Vai, before resolving to continue as a trio. They recorded the studio album Danger Money, released in March 1979, and spent much of that year touring North America as opening act for Jethro Tull. The album spawned a minor hit single, "Nothing to Lose", which reached number 67 on the UK charts. A live album, Night After Night, was recorded in Japan that spring and released in September 1979. Following a final European tour in December 1979, and in spite of plans to record a new studio album in the USA in March 1980, U.K. disbanded as Jobson and Wetton had different ideas on how the band should develop. Jobson wanted UK to go on with more long instrumental pieces, while Wetton thought that performing shorter, more commercial songs was a better idea. Jobson stated that one particularly pop-oriented song contributed to the band dissolving: "When Will You Realize", a non-LP B-side featured on the "Night After Night" single, which Wetton would re-record (with slightly different lyrics) in 1980 on his solo album Caught in the Crossfire.

=== Aftermath ===
Jobson worked with Jethro Tull on the album A (1980) and went on to a solo career. Wetton, following the recording of his solo album Caught in the Crossfire (summer 1980) and a brief stint with Wishbone Ash (October–December 1980), eventually left E.G. Records to sign with Geffen Records and ex-Yes manager Brian Lane and started Asia with Steve Howe, Carl Palmer and Geoffrey Downes. Bozzio formed Missing Persons with his then-wife Dale Bozzio, guitarist Warren Cuccurullo, bassist Patrick O'Hearn and Chuck Wild on keyboards– the first four also from line-ups with Zappa. Holdsworth and Bozzio played together in HoBoLeMa almost three decades later. John Wetton and Allan Holdsworth both died in 2017.

=== Legacy project ===
From 1995 to 1998, Jobson and Wetton worked together on a proposed U.K. reunion album, also recording contributions by Bruford, Tony Levin, Steve Hackett and Francis Dunnery. When Wetton departed, "Legacy" became an Eddie Jobson solo project, with Wetton replaced on vocals by Aaron Lippert. However, Jobson eventually abandoned this project. Three tracks intended for it were included on Voices of Life, a compilation by Bulgarian Women's Choir organised by Jobson.

=== UKZ and reunions ===
In October 2007, Jobson announced a new band, UKZ, with Lippert and former King Crimson bassist/guitarist Trey Gunn among others, which released an EP called "Radiation" in March 2009. In late 2009, Jobson and Wetton both talked about a possible reunion of U.K. A reunion tour in February/March 2010 with Jobson, Wetton, Marco Minnemann on drums (from UKZ) and Greg Howe (Victor Wooten, Vitalij Kuprij, Michael Jackson) on guitar was described to promoters, but would not happen until 2011.

Wetton and Jobson performed three concerts in Poland in November 2009 as part of Jobson's Ultimate Zero (U-Z) project. The line-up also featured Minnemann, Howe, and Tony Levin (stick). They performed music from UK and King Crimson. A CD compiled from various U-Z performances from 2009, entitled Ultimate Zero Tour - Live, including multiple tracks from the Polish shows, was then released.

It was announced on 11 February 2011, and later confirmed by John Wetton on his website, that U.K. had reformed to play two shows in Japan on 15 and 16 April 2011. The line-up was Jobson and Wetton, with Minnemann and Alex Machacek performing drums and guitar respectively. US dates, including a show in San Francisco, were also announced and performed in April 2011. A DVD called "Reunion: Live in Tokyo" was culled from these shows and officially released in 2013.

Bozzio then rejoined for an American tour in 2012. The line-up for the subsequent European tour included additional musicians Gary Husband (drums) and a returning Alex Machacek on guitar.

In 2013, U.K. did an "Azure Seas" tour with Machacek once again taking on guitar duties, and an East Coast tour with Virgil Donati performing drumming duties in place of Bozzio, who had once again departed the band. On 8 November of the same year, the band did also a special concert performance of their two studio albums in Kawasaki, in Japan. The drummer for that special concert was Marco Minnemann.

U.K. appeared in the 2014 edition of Cruise to the Edge progressive rock festival. The line-up once again included both Machacek and Donati. In 2015 the band announced their final world tour, with the band being joined by Donati and Machacek. Donati was then replaced by then Dream Theater drummer Mike Mangini for the final dates in the USA and Japan.

== Musical style ==
Throughout their brief existence, U.K.'s music was characterised by skilled musicianship, jazzy harmonies, close harmony vocals, mixed meters, electric violin solos, and unusually varied synthesiser (Yamaha CS-80) sonorities. Relative to specific styles, the band spans various genres ranging from progressive rock to jazz fusion.

== Personnel ==
Members

- Eddie Jobson – keyboards, backing vocals, violin (1977–1980, 2009, 2011–2015)
- John Wetton – bass, lead vocals (1977–1980, 2009, 2011–2015; died 2017)
- Allan Holdsworth – guitar (1977–1978; died 2017)
- Bill Bruford – drums, percussion (1977–1978)
- Terry Bozzio – drums, percussion, backing vocals (1978–1980, 2012, 2013)

Touring members

- Tony Levin – Chapman Stick (2009)
- Greg Howe – guitar (2009)
- Alex Machacek – guitar (2011, 2012–2015)
- Marco Minnemann – drums, percussion (2009, 2011, 2013)
- Gary Husband – drums, percussion (2012)
- Virgil Donati – drums, percussion (2013–2015)
- Mike Mangini – drums, percussion (2015)

== Discography ==
=== Studio albums ===
Year	Album	UK	US	CAN	NL
1978	U.K.	43	65	53	—
1979	Danger Money	—	45	63	37

=== Live albums ===
Year	Album	US	Notes
1979	Night After Night	109	Live 1979; recorded at Nakano Sun Plaza Hall and Nippon Seinenkan, Tokyo, Japan
1999	Concert Classics, Vol. 4	—	Live 1978; re-released as Live in America and Live in Boston
2013	Reunion – Live in Tokyo	—	Live 2011
2015	Curtain Call	—	Live 2013

=== Singles ===
Year	Single	UK	NL	Album	B-Side
1978	"In the Dead of Night"	—	—	U.K.	Mental Medication
1979	"Nothing to Lose"	67	—	Danger Money	In the Dead of Night (1979 Trio version)
1979	"Rendezvous 6:02"		30	Danger Money	In the Dead of Night (1979 Trio version)
1979	"Night After Night"	—	—	Night After Night	When Will You Realize
1979	"Rendezvous 6:02"			Night After Night	When Will You Realize

=== Videos ===
Year	Details
2013	Reunion – Live in Tokyo
2015	Curtain Call

=== Box sets ===
Year	Album
2016	Ultimate Collector's Edition

== Tours ==
Year	Live&Tour	Lineup	Release
Apr-Nov 1978	U.K. Tour	Eddie Jobson, John Wetton, Allan Holdsworth, Bill Bruford	Concert Classics, Vol. 4
Mar-Dec 1979	Danger Money Tour	Eddie Jobson, John Wetton, Terry Bozzio	Night After Night
Nov 2009 (Poland), as U-Z	Eddie Jobson's U-Z Project (aka U.K. 30th Anniversary Tour )	Eddie Jobson, John Wetton, Tony Levin, Greg Howe, Marco Minnemann	Ultimate Zero – The Best of the U-Z Project Live
Apr 2011	Reunion Tour	Eddie Jobson, John Wetton, Alex Machacek, Marco Minnemann	Reunion: Live in Tokyo
May-Jun 2012	Night After Night 2012 Tour	Eddie Jobson, John Wetton, Terry Bozzio (American Tour)	
May-Jun 2012	Night After Night 2012 Tour	Eddie Jobson, John Wetton, Alex Machacek, Gary Husband (European Tour, NEARfest Apocalypse)	
March 28&29 2013	Cruise to the Edge	Eddie Jobson, John Wetton, Terry Bozzio, Alex Machacek	
Mar-Apr 2013	Azure Seas Tour	Eddie Jobson, John Wetton, Alex Machacek, Virgil Donati	
November 8, 2013 (Japan)	Club Citta' Presents U.K. Special Live	Eddie Jobson, John Wetton, Alex Machacek, Marco Minnemann	Curtain Call
April 8&11 2014	Cruise to the Edge	Eddie Jobson, John Wetton, Alex Machacek, Virgil Donati	
Feb-Apr 2015	Final World Tour	Eddie Jobson, John Wetton, Alex Machacek, Mike Mangini	
