= Richard Palmer-James =

English musician (born 1947)

- Born: 11 June 1947 (age 79); Meyrick Park, Bournemouth, England
- Genres: Progressive rock, art rock
- Instruments: Guitar, vocals
- Years active: 1962-Present
- Formerly of: Supertramp

Richard William Palmer-James (born 11 June 1947) is an English guitarist, songwriter and lyricist. He may be best known as one of the founding members of Supertramp (playing guitar and songwriter); writing lyrics for several songs by the progressive rock group King Crimson in the early 1970s; and for writing lyrics for the 1985 hit "(I'll Never Be) Maria Magdalena" by Sandra.

Palmer-James was born in Meyrick Park, Bournemouth, where he got his start in the music business playing in various local bands: The Corvettes, The Palmer-James Group (formed with Alec James), Tetrad, and Ginger Man, all of which included John Wetton on bass and vocals. He was a founding member of Supertramp, playing guitar and singing vocals, as well as writing the lyrics for their self-titled debut album under the name Richard Palmer. He also co-wrote the lyrics of "Goldrush", a song written during his days in the band but not recorded until their 2002 album Slow Motion.

Palmer wrote lyrics for three of King Crimson's albums: Larks' Tongues in Aspic, Starless and Bible Black, and Red. He did not participate in any of King Crimson's recordings, but worked with John Wetton and David Cross after Robert Fripp disbanded the group in 1974.

Palmer has lived in Munich since the early 1970s. In 1978 he was visited by John Wetton and W.J. Hutcheson, his bandmates in Tetrad. Over 10 days, with the German drummer Curt Cress, they recorded, as "Jack-Knife", an album of songs from the early days called I Wish You Would. He wrote the English lyrics for La Bionda the Italo Disco inventors. Palmer-James also wrote lyrics for La Bionda and La Bionda-associated disco group D.D.Sound in the late 70s.

In 1997 he released a CD with former bandmate John Wetton, Monkey Business, a compilation of unreleased material including some songs that were recorded for the first time in studio, including a King Crimson tune called "Doctor Diamond".

== Selected discography ==
Supertramp

- 1970 : Supertramp
- 2002 : Slow Motion : One of his compositions, "Goldrush", is featured here.

Emergency

- 1973 : Get Out to the Country

King Crimson

- 1973 : Larks' Tongues in Aspic
- 1974 : Starless & Bible Black
- 1974 : Red

D.D.Sound

- 1977 : Disco Delivery - lyricist on all four albums
- 1977 : 1-2-3-4... Gimme Some More!
- 1978 : Café
- 1979 : The Hootchie Coochie

Munich

- 1979 : Sideshow/Wednesday - Single - The song "Sideshow" was written by Palmer-James & Hermann Weindorf.

Jack Knife

- 1979 : I Wish You Would - With John Wetton.

Pan Demonium

- 1979 : Start the Fire - co-composer of two songs: "Walking on Air" and "Touch Me"

Eruption

- 1983 : Our Way - co-composer of two songs: "Big Bang" and "In 1000 years"

John Wetton

- 1998 : Arkangel - With Robert Fripp, Steve Hackett, etc.
- 2011 : Raised in captivity - The song "The Devil and the Opera House" was co-written by Palmer-James, John Wetton & Billy Sherwood.

John Wetton & Richard Palmer-James

- 1998 : Monkey Business 1972 - 1997
- 2014 : Jack-Knife / Monkey Business 1972 - 1997

Richard Palmer-James

- 2016 : Takeaway

== Sources ==
- Discography, discogs.com; accessed 10 June 2017.
