= List of Asia band members =

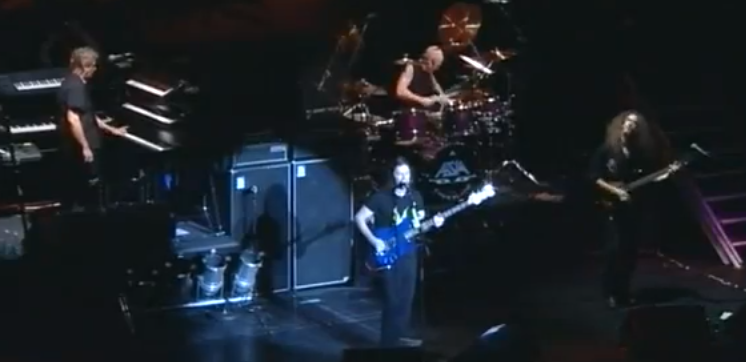
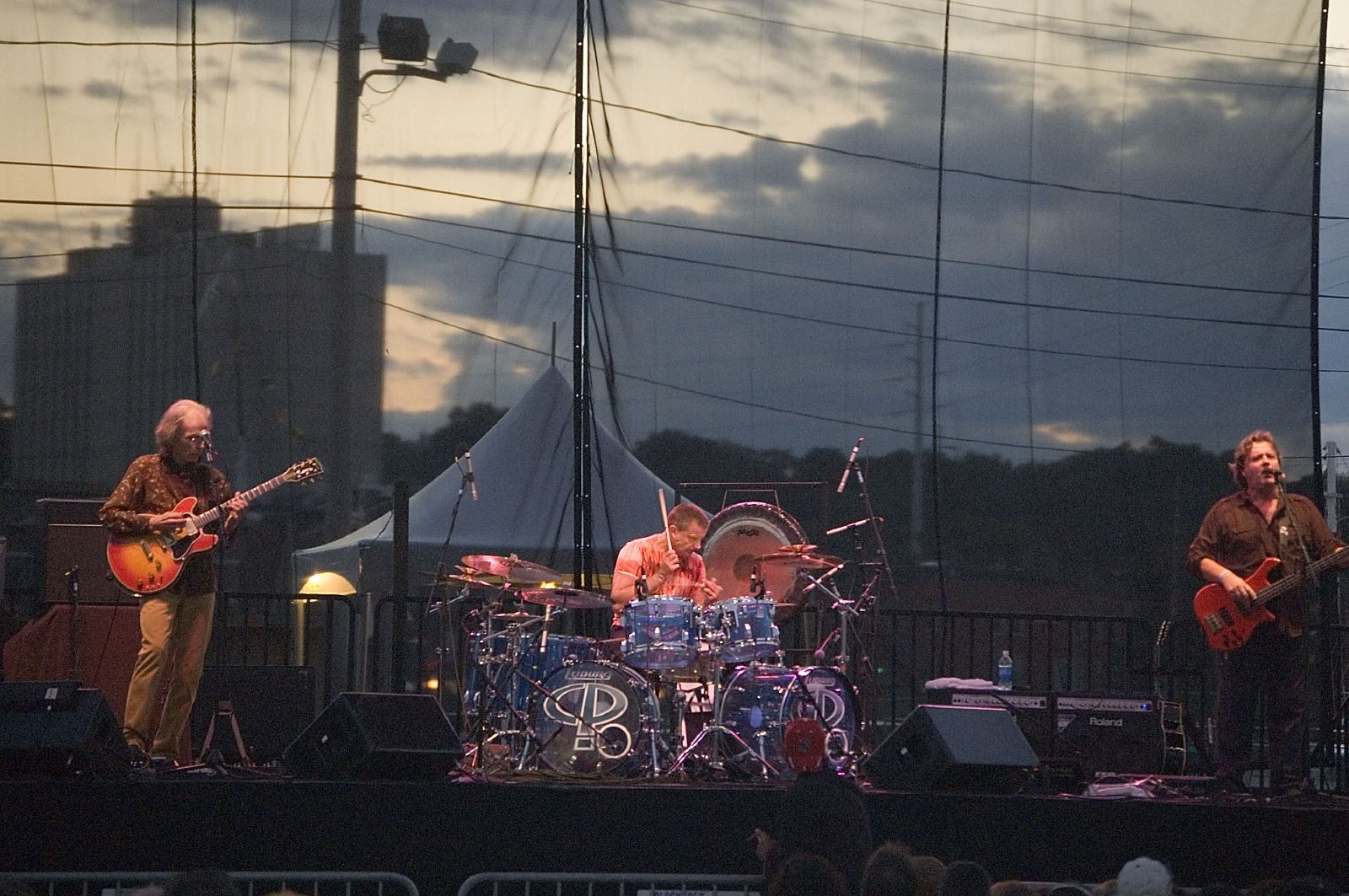
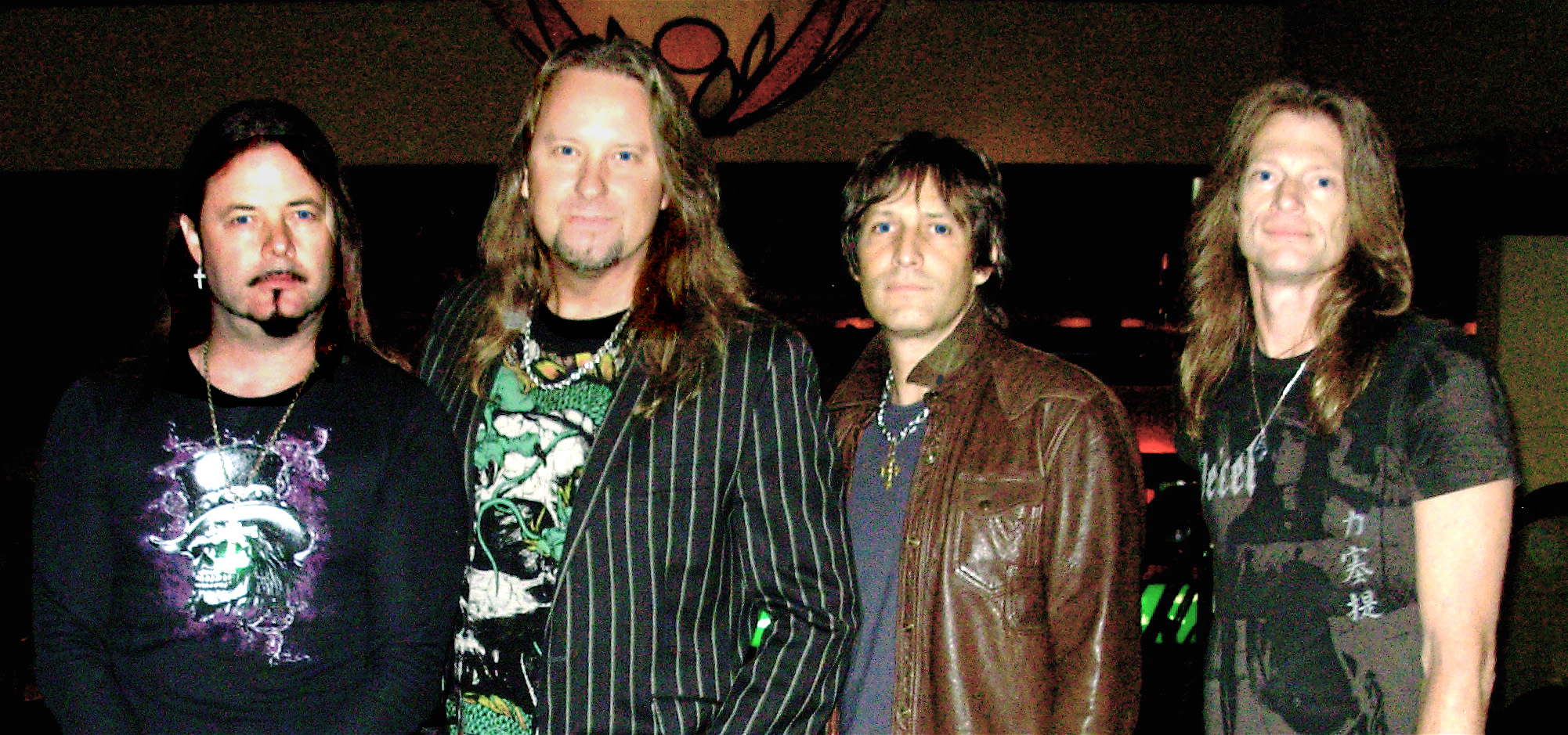
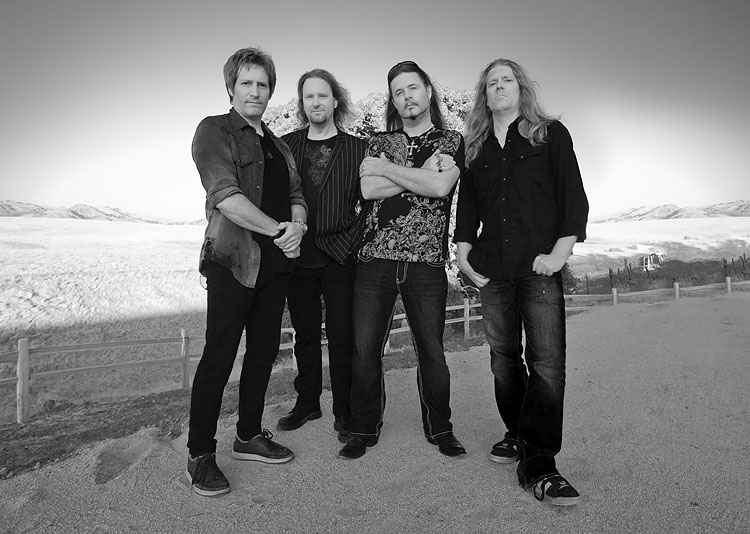
Lineups in 2001, 2006, 2009 and 2011

Asia are an English rock supergroup, founded in 1981 by lead vocalist and bassist John Wetton (King Crimson and U.K.), guitarist Steve Howe (Yes), keyboardist Geoff Downes (Yes and the Buggles) and drummer Carl Palmer (Emerson, Lake & Palmer). The band's current lineup includes Downes (a consistent member, save for a brief period in 1989), guitarist John Mitchell, bassist and vocalist Harry Whitley and drummer Virgil Donati (all since 2024).

Another version of the band is led by John Payne, who was lead vocalist and bassist between 1991 and 2006. This formation was founded in 2007 following a reunion of the original members, with then current members Payne, Guthrie Govan (guitar) and Jay Schellen (drums) joining keyboardist Erik Norlander as Asia featuring John Payne. Their current lineup includes guitarist Jeff Kollman (who first joined in 2012), keyboardist Ryo Okumoto (who first joined in 2014) and drummer Aaron Olson (who first joined in 2022).

== History ==
Asia began in early 1981 after the apparent ending of Yes and Emerson, Lake & Palmer, two of the founding bands of British progressive rock. After the breakup of King Crimson in 1974, various plans for a supergroup involving bassist John Wetton had not been successful, including the abortive British Bulldog project with Bill Bruford and Rick Wakeman in 1976. In 1977 Bruford and Wetton were reunited in U.K., augmented by guitarist Allan Holdsworth and keyboardist/violinist Eddie Jobson.

In early January 1981, Wetton and former Yes guitarist Steve Howe were brought together by A&R man John Kalodner and Geffen Records to start writing material for a new album. They were eventually joined by drummer Carl Palmer and finally by Howe's fellow member of Yes, keyboardist Geoff Downes. Asia's debut album Asia, released in March 1982. Asia's second album Alpha was released in July 1983.

In October 1983 Wetton left the group after the comparatively disappointing sales of Alpha. The band says that Wetton quit; Wetton stated that he was fired by phone. There is no universally agreed version of what happened. In December 1983 ex-King Crimson and ELP lead singer and bassist Greg Lake replaced Wetton for a few concerts in Japan.

Following Lake's departure, Wetton was asked to return to Asia after his three-month absence; he returned on the condition that Steve Howe was ousted from the band. For a while, the group considered continuing as a three-piece without a permanent guitarist, inviting guest guitarists such as Jeff Beck and David Gilmour into the studio. Geffen Records suggested recruiting Krokus guitarist Mandy Meyer, who got on well with the band and was offered a permanent position.

The third Asia album was tentatively titled Arcadia, but during production it was discovered that that name was being used by a forthcoming spin-off project from Duran Duran. The retitled Astra, released in November 1985. The band charted another single with "Go" (No. 46), featuring Meyer's guitar work as a primary element. The music video was another hit with MTV but in 1986 this Asia lineup folded, bringing the group to an end for the time being. Wetton is quoted as saying "[Astra] did really well in Sweden ... but Swedish sales aren't that large."

Wetton and Palmer reunited the band for tours of Europe in the summer and autumn of 1989. Downes (working on a project with Greg Lake) was not available, so keyboards were played by John Young. Guitars on the tour were handled by Alan Darby (replaced by German guitarist Holger Larisch), and Zoe Nicholas and Susie Webb were brought aboard to provide back-up vocals. Unlike Wetton's later anger at Asia continuing without him in the 1990s, this lineup was viewed favourably by other Asia band members.

Asia returned to the studio in 1990 with Downes, Toto guitarist Steve Lukather and other studio musicians and released Then & Now (August 1990), a best-of with four new tracks. "Days Like These" from the disc received substantial airplay during the summer of 1990 on AOR radio stations and re-sparked some interest in the band. Pat Thrall joined Downes, Palmer and Wetton on tour and they performed classic material, including King Crimson and U.K. songs. Wetton left the group in April 1991 after a South American tour, discouraged by Asia's lack of success in the United States.

After Wetton's departure, vocalist/bassist John Payne joined the band and, together with Downes, enlisted new musicians and led Asia through to 2006. The first album with this lineup was Aqua, released in June 1992. In addition to Downes and Payne, the album featured Howe, Palmer, and guitarist Al Pitrelli (of Danger Danger, Megadeth and Alice Cooper). Howe returned during the sessions having just left Yes again, but Palmer would leave soon, committing to an ELP reunion, and was able to play on just three songs. Drummers Simon Phillips and Nigel Glockler then completed the sessions.

The 1992–93 tour featured Downes, Howe, Payne, guitarist Vinny Burns and drummer Trevor Thornton. Before a European festival tour in late 1993, Howe and Burns left and were replaced by guitarist Keith More. The group released Aria in May 1994, which featured lead guitarist Al Pitrelli once again, who would leave Asia during the short Aria tour. The Aria album did not fare well commercially and the ensuing tour was limited to four concerts. Ex-Simply Red guitarist Aziz Ibrahim took over during the tour. Aria also introduced new drummer Michael Sturgis, who had been involved during the band's aborted 1987 reunion and had appeared on some of the sessions for Aqua. Aria was not released in the United States until May 1995.

Next, Arena, released in February 1996, featured Downes, Payne, Sturgis, Ibrahim and guest guitarist Elliott Randall (ex-Steely Dan, and Randy Crawford). The group's lone promotional performance in conjunction with the album occurred on 19 April 1996, when Downes and Payne appeared with guitarist Elliott Randall on the Virgin FM radio programme Alive in London to play the song "Never".

An all-acoustic album, Live Acoustic, was recorded by the group at Stadthalle, Bruchsal, Germany on 21 September 1997 (and released in December 1999) that featured a lineup of Downes, Payne, Ibrahim, and drummer Bob Richards. Also in 1997, a best of album Anthology, featuring songs from the past six albums was released. However, a lawsuit from Wetton meant that songs from the first three albums needed to be re-recorded.

In 1999 there was talk of a reunion of the original lineup minus Howe. The original proposition included Dave Kilminster on guitar, who had previously toured and recorded with Wetton. While Howe was interested in participating, he was unable to because of his busy schedule with Yes. This reunion did not take place and John Payne continued to carry on Asia with Downes uninterrupted. Wetton and Palmer did, however, get together to form Qango, which included Kilminster and John Young, although the band was short-lived. Kilminster went on to work with Roger Waters.

Also in 1999, Rare, Asia's seventh studio album was released on Resurgence. It was made up of the instrumental music, which Downes and Payne had composed for the soundtrack for David Attenborough's documentary nature film Salmon: Against the Tides (tracks 1–16) and for an unreleased CD-ROM video game (tracks 17–22).

2001's Aura featured three different session guitarists, including Ian Crichton (of Canadian progressive rock band Saga) who'd briefly joined Asia in 1998–1999. Aura took a more progressive rock form, but still did not recapture the commercial success of the first album. Former members Howe, Thrall, Sturgis and Elliott Randall also made guest appearances. The single "Ready to Go Home" was barely distributed. Asia then signed with Recognition Records. 2001 did see the band with a stable lineup, achieved during the Aura sessions featuring Downes, Payne, guitarist Guthrie Govan and ex-Manfred Mann's Earth Band/The Firm/Uriah Heep/Gary Numan/AC/DC drummer Chris Slade (who had first joined Asia in 1999, briefly).

In August 2005 Slade left Asia to be replaced by drummer Jay Schellen. The new band started work on an album, tentatively entitled Architect of Time, which was originally planned for release early in 2006, though subsequent developments would cause this project to be shelved. Half of this material ended up being released on the album Window to the Soul in August 2006 under the new band name of GPS, which was an acronym for the three players involved: Govan, Payne and Schellen. After this, the three continued on as Asia Featuring John Payne in 2007.

In early 2006, Downes left for a reunion of the original band lineup under the Asia name, a breakup that Payne described as "painful". The existing lineup (minus Downes) continued for a short while before morphing into the aforementioned GPS.

Following Downes' departure, on 9 May 2006, John Payne, Geoff Downes, John Wetton, Carl Palmer and Steve Howe contractually agreed that John Payne could continue his 15-year period with Asia as Asia Featuring John Payne. Asia featuring John Payne debuted in 2007 with Payne on vocals/bass, Guthrie Govan on guitar, Erik Norlander on keyboards and Jay Schellen on drums. Downes, Wetton, Palmer and Howe continued to perform and record as Asia thereafter.

In mid-2007, all four original members (Wetton, Downes, Howe and Palmer) went into the studio to record a new album, marking the first recorded material from all four original members since 1983's Alpha. The band continued to tour until major heart surgery for Wetton in the second half of the year saw remaining tour dates rescheduled for 2008. The new studio album, entitled Phoenix, was released on Frontiers Records on 14 April 2008 (via EMI/Capitol on 15 April in North America).

Asia featuring John Payne toured the US through 2008. In 2009, the band released an EP entitled Military Man. The band has continued to tour the US since 2008, performing songs from the entire history of Asia, both before and during Payne's time in the band. In 2009 Govan was replaced by Mitch Perry, a session musician with experience touring with major acts including Cher, Michael Schenker and Edgar Winter. In August 2011, the band played summer tour dates in the US with a new guitarist, Bruce Bouillet. In 2012, the band announced that Bouillet had left to pursue solo work, replacing him with a dual guitar lineup of Moni Scaria and Jeff Kollman. In 2014, Norlander was replaced by Ryo Okumoto from GPS. Schellen stopped working with the band in 2016, and started filling in for Alan White in Yes alongside Geoff Downes.

On 10 January 2013, Steve Howe announced his retirement from the band to focus on other projects, including Yes, bringing an end to the reunion of the original lineup. Asia in turn announced they would be continuing with new guitarist Sam Coulson, with a new album in the works entitled Gravitas. The new lineup performed live in 2013.

On 11 January 2017, Wetton released a statement that, due to receiving another round of chemotherapy, he would be unable to perform on the 12 dates announced for the Journey tour, and that he would be substituted by Billy Sherwood, one of Downes' Yes bandmates, and Wetton's own co-writer and producer of the album Raised in Captivity. The band originally wanted to cancel the tour altogether, but Journey's management and agents refused, forcing them to pick Sherwood as last-minute replacement.

Wetton died on 31 January 2017 at the age of 67; Palmer later stated "So, we used Billy and we had a phenomenal time. It was a great experience all 'round, and I'm pleased we did it. John would have loved to be on that tour, so I'm pleased we did it for him, anyway." On 17 June 2017 Asia performed a show in homage to Wetton, titled An Extraordinary Life. The show was an interactive celebration of Wetton's music and life. Fan dedications were sent into management and shown on a large projection screen above the stage.

Material by Payne and Norlander for the Asia featuring John Payne album to be called Americana, including the single "Seasons Will Change", was then released under the name Dukes of the Orient instead in 2018. Payne and Norlander described this decision as coming out of respect for the passing of John Wetton, also citing this material was written by them and not under Asia. Asia featuring John Payne (without Norlander) has continued as a live act.

After Wetton's death, Downes stated that the duo had been working on another Asia album and stated that he hopes to eventually finish and release it as a final testament to Wetton. It is unclear whether Wetton had recorded any parts, or if the album had only been in the songwriting process. In August 2017, Palmer stated that there were no immediate plans for Asia to continue, as it was too soon to make any decisions and the band members would be busy on other projects in the meantime.

On 2 April 2019, the band announced it would join Yes, John Lodge, and Carl Palmer's ELP Legacy as part of The Royal Affair Tour, a 26-date Summer 2019 North American joint tour, with founding guitarist Steve Howe rejoining the band for a portion of the set. The band also confirmed that Sam Coulson had amicably left Asia to focus on solo projects and that he'd be replaced as guitarist by Ron "Bumblefoot" Thal, specifically for the tour also took over lead vocals, with Sherwood remaining on bass but moving to backing vocals. Coulson confirmed his departure on Twitter the same day.

In 2022, Asia announced a 40th Anniversary Tour, with Marc Bonilla on guitar and vocals. However, the tour was later cancelled due to Alan Parsons, the band's opening act, backing out in order to undergo surgery. Following the cancellation, Palmer said in February 2023 that there were no plans for any activity for the rest of the year.

In 2022, Aaron Olson replaced Johnny Fedevich on drums in Asia FJP.

At a memorial concert to the late John Wetton on 3 August 2023, a lineup played Asia songs based on Geoff Downes, John Mitchell, Harry Whitley, Jay Schellen and Billy Sherwood. A new lineup was then announced for a 2024 summer tour of Geoff Downes (keys), Virgil Donati (drums), John Mitchell (guitar) and Harry Whitley (bass, vocals).

In 2025, Asia FJP included Mark Cole on guitar and bass and Walter Ino on keyboards. Later 2025, the band were joined by guitarist Francis Dunnery and returning keyboardist Ryo Okumoto, although Dunnery was replaced by a returning Kollman.

== Members ==
=== Current ===
Image	Name	Years active	Instruments	Release contributions
	Geoff Downes	1981–1986; 1990–present	keyboards; backing vocals	all releases
	John Mitchell	2023; 2024–present	guitar; backing vocals	Indigo
	Harry Whitley	2023; 2024–present	lead vocals; bass	Indigo
	Virgil Donati	2024–present	drums; percussion	Indigo

=== Former ===
Image	Name	Years active	Instruments	Release contributions
	Carl Palmer	1981–1986; 1989–1992; 2006–2022	drums; percussion	all releases from Asia (1982) to Aqua (1992) and from Fantasia: Live in Tokyo (2007) onwards; Archiva 2 (1996); Now: Live in Nottingham (1997); The Very Best of Asia: Heat of the Moment (1982–1990) (2000); Alive in Hallowed Halls (2001); Enso Kai - Live at the Budokan, Tokyo 1983 (2001); Quadra - Live Throughout The Years (2001); Bedrock in Concert (2002); Live In Buffalo (2003); Dragon Attack (2003); Live In Hyogo (2003); Live In Massachussettes `83 (2004)
	Steve Howe	1981–1984; 1992–1993; 2006–2013 (guest 2000, 2019)	guitar; pedal steel guitar; mandolin; backing vocals	all releases from Asia (1982) to Aurora (1986) except Astra (1985); Then & Now (1990); Aqua (1992); Archiva 1 (1996); Anthology (1997); Live in Osaka (1997); Live In Philadelphia (1997); Live at the Town & Country Club (1999); The Very Best of Asia: Heat of the Moment (1982–1990) (2000); Aura (2001); Alive in Hallowed Halls (2001); Enso Kai - Live at the Budokan, Tokyo 1983 (2001); Quadra - Live Throughout The Years (2001); Live In Buffalo (2003); Different Worlds Live (2003); Live In Massachussettes `83 (2004); Fantasia: Live in Tokyo (2007); Live in San Francisco (2008); Phoenix (2008); Omega (2010); XXX (2012)
	John Wetton	1981–1983; 1984–1986; 1989–1991; 2006–2017 (until his death)	lead vocals; bass; acoustic guitar	all releases from Asia (1982) to Aurora (1986); Then & Now (1990); Live in Moscow (1991); Now: Live in Nottingham (1997); The Very Best of Asia: Heat of the Moment (1982–1990) (2000); Alive in Hallowed Halls (2001); Quadra - Live Throughout The Years (2001); Bedrock in Concert (2002); Live In Buffalo (2003); Dragon Attack (2003); Live In Hyogo (2003); Live In Massachussettes `83 (2004); Official Bootleg – Live in the UK (2007); Fantasia: Live in Tokyo (2007); Live in San Francisco (2008)
	Greg Lake	1983–1984 (died 2016)	lead vocals; bass	Enso Kai - Live at the Budokan, Tokyo 1983 (2001)
	Mandy Meyer	1984–1986	guitar; backing vocals	Astra (1985); Aurora (1986) one track; Then & Now (1990); The Very Best of Asia: Heat of the Moment (1982–1990) (2000)
	Pat Thrall	1990–1991	guitar; backing vocals	Live in Moscow (1991); Now: Live in Nottingham (1997); Aura (2001); Quadra - Live Throughout The Years (2001); Bedrock in Concert (2002); Dragon Attack (2003); Live In Hyogo (2003)
	John Payne	1991–2006	lead vocals; bass; guitar	all releases from Aqua (1992) to Silent Nation (2004), except Now: Live in Nottingham (1997), The Very Best of Asia: Heat of the Moment (1982–1990) (2000), Alive in Hallowed Halls (2001), Enso Kai - Live at the Budokan, Tokyo 1983 (2001), Quadra - Live Throughout The Years (2001), Bedrock in Concert (2002), Live In Buffalo (2003), Dragon Attack (2003), Live In Hyogo (2003) and Live In Massachussettes `83 (2004)
	Al Pitrelli	1991–1992; 1993–1994	guitar	Aqua (1992); Aria (1994); Archiva 1 (1996); Archiva 2 (1996); Anthology (1997)
	Mike Sturgis	1994–1997; 1998–1999	drums; percussion	Then & Now (1990); Aria (1994); Arena (1996); Archiva 1 (1996); Archiva 2 (1996); Anthology (1997); Live in Köln (1997); Aura (2001)
	Chris Slade	1999; 2000–2005	drums; percussion	Aura (2001); America: Live in the USA (2002); Silent Nation (2004)
	Guthrie Govan	2000–2006	guitar; backing vocals	Aura (2001); America: Live in the USA (2002); Silent Nation (2004)
	Jay Schellen	2005–2006; 2023	drums; percussion	none
	Sam Coulson	2013–2018	guitar; backing vocals	Gravitas (2014)
	Billy Sherwood	2017–2023 (guest 2004)	bass; backing vocals (2019–2022); lead vocals (2017–2019); guitar (guest 2004)	Silent Nation (2004)
	Ron "Bumblefoot" Thal	2019–2021	lead vocals; guitar	none
	Marc Bonilla	2022	lead vocals; guitar	none

=== Credited guest musicians ===
Image	Name	Years active	Instruments	Release contributions
	John Young	1989	keyboards; backing vocals	none
	Zoe Nicholas	1989	backing vocals	none
	Susie Webb	1989	backing vocals	none
	Alan Darby	1989	guitar	none
	Holger Larisch	1989	guitar	none
	Steve Lukather	1990	guitar	Then & Now (1990); The Very Best of Asia: Heat of the Moment (1982–1990) (2000)
	Trevor Thornton	1992–1994	drums	Archiva 2 (1996); Live in Osaka (1997); Live in Philadelphia (1997); Live at the Town & Country Club (1999); Different Worlds Live (2003)
	Vinny Burns	1992–1993	guitar; backing vocals	Live in Osaka (1997); Live in Philadelphia (1997); Live at the Town & Country Club (1999); Different Worlds Live (2003)
	Keith More	1993	guitar; backing vocals	none
	Aziz Ibrahim	1994–1998	guitar; backing vocals	Arena (1996); Anthology (1997); Live in Köln (1997); Live Acoustic (1999); Different Worlds Live (2003)
	Elliott Randall	1996	guitar	Arena (1996); Archiva 2 (1996); Anthology (1997); Aura (2001)
	Bob Richards	1997	drums	Live Acoustic (1999); Different Worlds Live (2003)
	Ian Crichton	1998–1999	guitar	Aura (2001)
	Tony Levin	2001	bass	Aura (2001)

=== Asia featuring John Payne ===
==== Current members ====
Image	Name	Years active	Instruments	Release contributions
	John Payne	2007–present	lead vocals; bass; additional guitar	all releases
	Jeff Kollman	2012–2024; 2025–present	guitar; backing vocals	"Seasons Will Change" (2012); Recollections: A Tribute to British Prog (2014)
	Ryo Okumoto	2014–2017; 2025–present	keyboards	none
	Aaron Olson	2022–present	drums	none

==== Former members ====
Image	Name	Years active	Instruments	Release contributions
	Jay Schellen	2007–2016	drums; percussion; backing vocals	Extended Versions/Scandinavia (2007); Military Man (2009); "Seasons Will Change" (2012); Recollections: A Tribute to British Prog (2014)
	Erik Norlander	2007–2014	keyboards; backing vocals	Military Man (2009); "Seasons Will Change" (2012); Recollections: A Tribute to British Prog (2014)
	Guthrie Govan	2007–2009	guitar; backing vocals	Military Man (2009)
	Mitch Perry	2009–2011	guitar; backing vocals	none
	Bruce Bouillet	2011–2012	guitar	Recollections: A Tribute to British Prog (2014)
	Moni Scaria	2012–2024	guitar; backing vocals	"Seasons Will Change" (2012); Recollections: A Tribute to British Prog (2014)
	Johnny Fedevich	2017–2022	drums; percussion	none
	Jamie Hosmer	2017–2024	keyboards; backing vocals	none
	Walter Ino	2025	keyboards; backing vocals	none
	Mark Cole	2025	guitar; bass	none
	Francis Dunnery	2025	guitar	none
