= Asia discography =

Cataloguing of published recordings by Asia

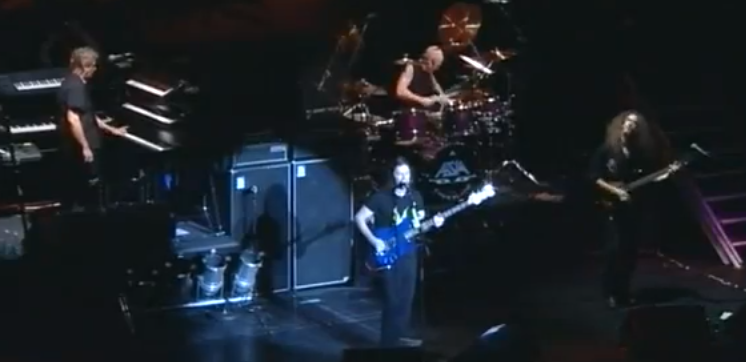
- Asia performing in 2001
- Studio albums: 14
- Extended plays: 2
- Live albums: 35
- Compilation albums: 13
- Singles: 23
- Music videos: 13

This article presents the discography of English rock supergroup Asia.

== Albums ==
=== Studio albums ===
| Title | Album details | Peak chart positions | | | | | | | Certifications (sales thresholds) |
| Title | Album details | UK | AUS | GER | JPN | NLD | SWI | US | Certifications (sales thresholds) |
|---|---|---|---|---|---|---|---|---|---|
| Asia | Released: 18 March 1982; Label: Geffen | 11 | 13 | 6 | 15 | 10 | — | 1 | AUS: Gold; CAN: 3× Platinum; FRA: Gold; JP: Platinum; SWI: Gold; UK: Gold; US: 4× Platinum |
| Alpha | Released: 12 August 1983; Label: Geffen | 5 | 46 | 11 | 4 | 9 | 18 | 6 | CAN: Platinum; JP: 2 x Platinum; UK: Silver; US: Platinum |
| Astra | Released: 11 November 1985; Label: Geffen | 68 | 99 | 48 | 15 | — | 10 | 67 | |
| Aqua | Released: 8 June 1992; Label: InsideOut Music | — | — | 51 | 21 | — | 20 | — | |
| Aria | Released: 13 June 1994; Label: InsideOut Music | — | — | 89 | 20 | — | 31 | — | |
| Arena | Released: 11 March 1996; Label: InsideOut Music | — | — | — | 48 | — | 50 | — | |
| Rare | Released: 1999; Label: Resurgence | — | — | — | — | — | — | — | |
| Aura | Released: 12 February 2001; Label: Recognition | 160 | — | — | — | — | — | — | |
| Silent Nation | Released: 31 August 2004; Label: InsideOut Music | — | — | 77 | — | — | — | — | |
| Phoenix | Released: 11 April 2008; Label: Frontiers | 166 | — | 58 | 27 | — | 75 | 73 | |
| Omega | Released: 23 April 2010; Label: Frontiers | 135 | — | 56 | 29 | — | 55 | — | |
| XXX | Released: 29 June 2012; Label: Frontiers | 69 | — | 33 | 36 | — | 43 | 134 | |
| Gravitas | Released: 21 March 2014; Label: Frontiers | 92 | — | 51 | 42 | — | 24 | 159 | |
| Indigo | Released: 6 November 2026; Label: Frontiers | 28 | — | 16 | 58 | — | 5 | — | |
"—" denotes releases that did not chart

=== Live albums ===
| Title | Album details | Peak chart positions |
| Title | Album details | JPN |
|---|---|---|
| Live in Moscow | Released: 21 December 1991; Recorded: 9 November 1990 at Olympijski Stadium (Moscow, USSR); Label: Rhino | — |
| Now: Live in Nottingham | Released: March 1997; Recorded: 23 June 1990 at Central Studios (Nottingham, UK); Label: Blueprint | — |
| Live in Osaka | Released: May 1997; Recorded: 4 June 1992 at Kōsei Nenkin Kaikan (Osaka, Japan); Label: Blueprint | — |
| Live in Köln | Released: July 1997; Recorded: 5 October 1994 at Alter Wartesaal (Cologne, Germany); Label: Blueprint | — |
| Live in Philadelphia | Released: November 1997; Recorded: 21 November 1992 at Chestnut Cabaret (Philadelphia, US); Label: Blueprint | — |
| Live at the Town & Country Club | Released: October 1999; Recorded: 10 November 1992 at Town & Country Club (London, UK); Label: Resurgence | — |
| Live Acoustic | Released: November 1999; Recorded: 21 September 1997 at Stadthalle (Bruchsal, Germany); Label: Resurgence | — |
| The Best of Asia Live | Released: October 2000; Label: Eagle Records | — |
| Alive in Hallowed Halls | Released: March 2001; Recorded: 10 September 1983 at Pine Knob Music Theatre (Detroit, US); Label: Zoom Club Records | — |
| Enso Kai – Live at the Budokan, Tokyo 1983 | Released: June 2001; Recorded: 7 December 1983 at Budokan (Tokyo, Japan); Label: MSI / Burning Airlines / Superior | — |
| Quadra – Live Throughout The Years | Released: 2001; Recorded: 25 April 1982 at Stanley Theater (Pittsburgh, US), 22 August 1983 at Centrum (Worcester, US), 13 December 1990 at Frankfurt Music Hall (Frankfurt, Germany); Label: Zoom Club Records | — |
| Bedrock in Concert | Released: 2002; Recorded: 1990; Label: Classic Rock Productions | — |
| America: Live in the USA | Released: 2002; Recorded: 5 October 2002 at Patriot's Theater (Trenton, US); Label: Classic Rock Productions | — |
| Live in Buffalo | Released: 2003; Recorded: 3 May 1982 at Kleinhans Music Hall (Buffalo, US); Label: Trademark of Quality | — |
| Dragon Attack | Released: 2003; Recorded: 29 September 1990 at Nakano Sunplaza (Tokyo, Japan); Label: Trademark of Quality | — |
| Live in Hyogo | Released: 2003; Recorded: 24 September 1990 at Archaic Hall (Amagasaki, Japan); Label: Trademark of Quality | — |
| Different Worlds Live | Released: 2003; Recorded: 10 November 1992 at Town & Country Club (London, UK), 21 September 1997 at Stadthalle (Bruchsal, Germany); Label: Shakedown Records | — |
| Live in Massachusetts '83 | Released: 2004; Recorded: 19 August 1983 at Centrum (Worcester, US); Label: Trademark of Quality | — |
| Official Bootleg – Live in the UK – Vol 1 | Released: 2007; Recorded: 28 November 2006 at Carling Academy (Liverpool, UK) | — |
| Official Bootleg – Live in the UK – Vol 2 | Released: 2007; Recorded: 30 November 2006 at Carling Academy (Glasgow, UK) | — |
| Official Bootleg – Live in the UK – Vol 3 | Released: 2007; Recorded: 3 December 2006 at Shepherd's Bush Empire (London, UK) | — |
| Fantasia: Live in Tokyo | Released: 21 June 2007; Recorded: 8 March 2007 at Tokyo Kōsei Nenkin Kaikan (Tokyo, Japan); Label: Eagle Records | 109 |
| Live in San Francisco 2008 | Released: 2008; Recorded: 5 May 2008 at The Regency Ballroom (San Francisco, US); Label: The Store for Music | — |
| Live in Tokyo 2008 | Released: 2008; Recorded: 12 May 2008 at International Forum (Tokyo, Japan); Label: The Store for Music | — |
| Live in Milwaukee 2008 | Released: 2008; Recorded: 23 April 2008 at Pabst Theater (Milwaukee, US); Label: The Store for Music | — |
| Live in São Paulo 2008 | Released: 2008; Recorded: 23 March 2008 (São Paulo, Brazil); Label: The Store for Music | — |
| Live in Barcelona 2008 | Released: 2008; Recorded: 19 May 2008 at Luz de Gas (Barcelona, Spain); Label: The Store for Music | — |
| Classic Airwaves | Released: 2010; Label: Stratford Copyright Ltd. | — |
| Live Around the World | Released: 2010; Label: Music Avenue | — |
| At High Voltage 2010 | Released: 2010; Recorded: 24 July 2010 at Victoria Park (London, UK); Label: Concert Live | — |
| Spirit of the Night: The Phoenix Tour Live in Cambridge 2009 | Released: 10 November 2010; Recorded: 9 August 2009 at Haggis Farm Polo Club (Cambridge, UK); Label: Frontiers Records | 271 |
| The Omega Tour Live – Live at the London Forum | Released: 2011; Recorded: 14 December 2010 at London Forum (London, UK); Label: Concert Live | — |
| Resonance: The Omega Tour 2010 | Released: 14 November 2012; Recorded: 4 May 2010 at Z7 (Basel, Switzerland); Label: Frontiers Records | — |
| Under the Bridge | Released: 2012; Recorded: 5 May 2008 at the Grand Ballroom of the Regency Center (San Francisco, California); Label: The Vinyl Countdown | — |
| High Voltage – Live | Released: 6 August 2014; Recorded: 24 July 2010 at Victoria Park (London, UK); Label: Frontiers Records | — |
| Axis XXX Live in San Francisco | Released: 1 July 2015; Recorded: 7 November 2012 at Regency Ballroom (San Francisco, US); Label: Frontiers Records | — |
| Symfonia – Live in Bulgaria 2013 (with the Plovdiv Opera Orchestra) | Released: 10 February 2017; Recorded: 21 September 2013 at Roman Theatre (Plovdiv, Bulgaria); Label: Frontiers Records | — |
| Aurora (Live) | Released: 2021; Recorded: 10 November 1992 at Town & Country Club (London, UK), 21 September 1997 at Stadthalle (Bruchsal, Germany), 4 June 1992 at Koseinenkin Kaikan (Osaka, Japan), 21 November 1992 at Chestnut Cabaret (Philadelphia, US), 5 October 1994 at Alter Wartesaal (Cologne, Germany); Label: Secret Records | — |
| The Official Bootlegs, Volume One | Released: 2021; Recorded: 3 May 1982 at Kleinhans Music Hall (Buffalo, US), 22 August 1983 at Centrum (Worcester, US), 23 March 2007 at Credicard Hall (São Paulo, Brazil), 12 May 2008 at International Forum (Tokyo, Japan), 14 December 2010 at HMV Forum (London, UK); Label: BMG | — |
| Asia in Asia – Live at The Budokan, Tokyo, 1983 | Released: 27 May 2022; Recorded: 6 December 1983 at the Budokan arena (Tokyo, Japan); Label: BMG | — |
| Asia - Live in England | Released: 13 March 2026; Recorded: April 2025 at the Trading Boundaries (Sussex, England); Label: Frontiers Records | — |
"—" denotes releases that did not chart

=== Compilation albums ===
| Title | Album details | Peak chart positions | Certifications (sales thresholds) |
| Title | Album details | US | Certifications (sales thresholds) |
|---|---|---|---|
| Then & Now | 1990 | 114 | US: Gold |
| Archiva 1 | 1996 | — | |
| Archiva 2 | 1996 | — | |
| Archives: Best of 1988–1997 | 1997 | — | |
| Anthology | 1997 | — | |
| Axioms | 1999 | — | |
| The Very Best of Asia: Heat of the Moment (1982–1990) | 2000 | — | |
| The Collection | 2000 | — | |
| The Best of Asia Live | 2001 | — | |
| Anthologia – The 20th Anniversary – Geffen Years Collection (1982–1990) | 2002 | — | |
| Classic Asia – Universal Masters Collection | 2002 | — | |
| 20th Century Masters – The Millennium Collection: The Best of Asia | 2003 | — | |
| Gold | 2005 | — | |
| Definitive Collection | 2006 | 183 | |
| Recollections | 2014 | — | |
"—" denotes releases that did not chart

== EPs ==
| Title | Album details | Peak chart position |
| Title | Album details | JPN |
|---|---|---|
| Aurora | Released: 1986 | 66 |
| Armada 1 | Released: 2002 | — |

== Singles ==
| Title | Year | Peak chart positions | | | | Album |
| Title | Year | US | US Main | GER | UK | Album |
|---|---|---|---|---|---|---|
| "Heat of the Moment" | 1982 | 4 | 1 | 7 | 46 | Asia |
| "Wildest Dreams" [airplay] | 1982 | — | 28 | — | — | Asia |
| "Only Time Will Tell": b/w "Time Again" [airplay] | 1982 | 17 — | 8; 43 | 50 — | 54 — | Asia |
| "Here Comes the Feeling" [airplay] | 1982 | — | 40 | — | — | Asia |
| "Sole Survivor" | 1982 | — | 10 | 75 | — | Asia |
| "Don't Cry": b/w "Daylight" [airplay] | 1983 | 10 — | 1; 24 | 54 — | 33 — | Alpha |
| "True Colors" [airplay] | 1983 | — | 20 | — | — | Alpha |
| "The Smile Has Left Your Eyes" | 1983 | 34 | 25 | — | 81 | Alpha |
| "The Heat Goes On" ^{[A]} | 1984 | — | 5 | — | — | Alpha |
| "Go" | 1985 | 46 | 7 | — | — | Astra |
| "Too Late" [airplay] | 1986 | — | 30 | — | — | Astra |
| "Wishing" | 1986 | — | — | — | — | Astra |
| "Days Like These" | 1990 | 64 | 2 | — | — | Then & Now |
| "Who Will Stop the Rain" | 1992 | — | — | — | — | Aqua |
| "Little Rich Boy" ^{[D]} | 1993 | — | — | — | — | Aqua |
| "Anytime" ^{[C]} | 1994 | — | — | — | — | Aria |
| "Long Way from Home" ^{[D]} | 2004 | — | — | — | — | Silent Nation |
| "Face on the Bridge" | 2012 | — | — | — | — | XXX |
"—" denotes releases that did not chart or were not released in that territory.

Notes:

- A – Single released in Japan.
- C – released in UK/Europe.
- D – released in Europe.

== Music videos ==
| Year | Title | Director(s) | Album |
|---|---|---|---|
| 1982 | "Heat of the Moment" | Kevin Godley, Lol Creme | Asia |
| 1982 | "Only Time Will Tell" | Kevin Godley, Lol Creme | Asia |
| 1982 | "Wildest Dreams" | John Doyle | Asia |
| 1983 | "Don't Cry" | Brian Grant | Alpha |
| 1983 | "The Smile Has Left Your Eyes" | Brian Grant | Alpha |
| 1985 | "Go" | Unknown | Astra |
| 1989 | "Prayin' For a Miracle" | Unknown | Then & Now |
| 1990 | "Days Like These" | Unknown | Then & Now |
| 1991 | "Kari-Anne" | Unknown | Live in Moscow |
| 1992 | "Who Will Stop the Rain" | Unknown | Aqua |
| 1994 | "Anytime" | Unknown | Aria |
| 2012 | "Face on the Bridge" | Unknown | XXX |
| 2012 | "Faithful" | Unknown | XXX |
| 2014 | "Valkyrie" | Unknown | Gravitas |
| 2026 | "The Traveller (Into The Light)" | Unknown | Indigo |
| 2026 | "Echo Of You" | Unknown | Indigo |
| 2026 | Arcadia | Unknown | Indigo |
