= The Very Best of Asia: Heat of the Moment (1982–1990) =

Greatest hits album by Asia
- Released: 6 June 2000
- Recorded: 1981–1990
- Genres: Progressive rock; album-oriented rock
- Length: 77:00
- Labels: Geffen Records; Universal Music
- Producers: Mike Ragogna and Dax Kimbrough

Asia chronology
Rare (1999)	The Very Best of Asia: Heat of the Moment (1982–1990) (2000)	Aura (2001)

Professional ratings
Review scores
Source	Rating
Allmusic	4.5/5 stars

The Very Best of Asia: Heat of the Moment (1982–1990) is a greatest hits compilation album by the English rock supergroup Asia, released in 2000. Covering the 1982–1990 period, it features songs from the band's first three albums, Asia, Alpha and Astra, plus three rare single B-sides ("Daylight", "Lying to Yourself", and "Ride Easy"), which had also been included on the Japan-exclusive EP Aurora in 1986, and one song from the Then & Now half compilation/half studio album released in 1990, "Days Like These".

The tracks "Sole Survivor" and "Here Comes the Feeling" are presented in their edited single versions. "Days Like These" features Toto guitarist Steve Lukather.

== Track listing ==
All tracks are written by John Wetton & Geoff Downes, except where noted.

No.	Title	Writer(s)	Origin	Length
1.	"Heat of the Moment"		Asia, 1982	3:51
2.	"Only Time Will Tell"		Asia	4:45
3.	"Sole Survivor" (Edited version)		Asia	3:40
4.	"Time Again"	Downes, Steve Howe, Carl Palmer, Wetton	Asia	4:45
5.	"Wildest Dreams"		Asia	5:11
6.	"Here Comes the Feeling" (Edited version)	Wetton, Howe	Asia	3:32
7.	"Don't Cry"		Alpha, 1983	3:31
8.	"Daylight"		"Don't Cry" single, 1983	3:32
9.	"The Smile Has Left Your Eyes"	Wetton	Alpha	3:15
10.	"Lying to Yourself"	Wetton, Howe	"The Smile Has Left Your Eyes" single, 1983	4:13
11.	"The Heat Goes On"		Alpha	4:55
12.	"Never in a Million Years"		Alpha	3:46
13.	"Open Your Eyes"		Alpha	6:24
14.	"Go"		Astra, 1985	4:06
15.	"Voice of America"		Astra	4:26
16.	"Too Late"	Wetton, Downes, Palmer	Astra	4:11
17.	"Days Like These"	Steve Jones	Then & Now, 1990	4:06
18.	"Ride Easy"	Wetton, Howe	"Heat of the Moment" & "Only Time Will Tell" singles, 1982	4:35

== Personnel ==
- Geoff Downes - keyboards, backing vocals
- Steve Howe - guitars, backing vocals
- John Wetton - bass, lead vocals, keyboards
- Carl Palmer - drums

with:

- Mandy Meyer - Guitar [tracks: 14–16]
- Steve Lukather - Guitar [track: 17]
