= Axioms (album) =

Compilation album by Asia
- Released: February 1999
- Recorded: 1991–1997
- Genres: Progressive rock; album-oriented rock
- Length: 111:02
- Label: Recall 2cd
- Producers: John Payne; Geoff Downes

Asia chronology
Anthology (1997)	Axioms (1999)	Rare (1999)

Axioms is a compilation by English rock supergroup Asia, released in February 1999 by Recall 2 cd.

== Track listing ==
All tracks are written by Geoff Downes and John Payne, except where noted.

Disc one
No.	Title	Writer(s)	Length
1.	"Bella Nova"		3:13
2.	"Who Will Stop the Rain?"	Downes, Johnny Warman, Ben Woolfenden	4:37
3.	"Heaven on Earth"	Payne, Andy Nye	4:54
4.	"Words"		5:19
5.	"Turn It Around"	Downes, Payne, Michael Sturgis	4:30
6.	"Summer"		4:07
7.	"Heaven"		5:18
8.	"A Far Cry"	Downes, Payne, Greg Hart, Bob Mitchell	5:32
9.	"Love Under Fire"	Downes, Greg Lake	5:16
10.	"Tell Me Why"		5:15
11.	"Anytime"		4:57
12.	"Aqua Part Two"		2:13
Total length:			55:18

Disc two
No.	Title	Writer(s)	Length
1.	"Into the Arena"	Downes, Payne, Elliott Randall, Tomoyasu Hotei	3:00
2.	"Military Man"		4:12
3.	"The Hunter"	Downes	5:22
4.	"Desire"	Payne, Nye, Downes	5:22
5.	"Sad Situation"		4:00
6.	"The Day Before the War"		9:08
7.	"Feels Like Love"		4:50
8.	"Different Worlds"		5:52
9.	"Remembrance Day"		4:19
10.	"U Bring Me Down"	Downes, Payne, Aziz Ibrahim	7:07
11.	"Aria"		2:28
Total length:			55:44
