= Sam Coulson =

English guitarist (born 1987)

- Born: 9 February 1987 (age 39); Chigwell, London, England, United Kingdom
- Genres: Hard rock, progressive rock, blues
- Occupation: Musician
- Instrument: Guitar
- Years active: 2007–present
- Formerly of: Asia
- Website: www.samcoulsonmusic.com

Sam Coulson (born 9 February 1987) is an English guitarist, best known for being a member of progressive rock band Asia from 2013 to 2018, after his guitar-playing skills were noticed on YouTube. Coulson was born in Chigwell London, and later moved to the Worcestershire town of Bromsgrove. In 2013 Coulson married and moved to Canada. As of 2019, he is currently the lead guitarist for the Queen-based musical, We Will Rock You on its North American tour.

== Career ==
Coulson made his debut on the video-hosting website YouTube in 2007, sharing videos of himself playing songs on the electric guitar. His playing attracted the attention of the famous American guitarist Paul Gilbert, who in July 2012 invited him to be a guest instructor for his "Great Guitar Escape" series of workshops, as well as seeing him being invited on stage to sit in with American blues musician Walter Trout in October of the same year.

This publicity led to Coulson joining the British rock band Asia. When Asia's guitarist Steve Howe retired from the band in January 2013, Coulson was selected as his replacement. According to Asia frontman John Wetton, the band had a "list of favourites" for Howe's replacement. Gilbert was one of these favourites, but was unable to take the role, and recommended Coulson. Coulson worked with Asia on their studio album Gravitas, released on 25 March 2014, as well as performing on the following tour. During Asia's 2015 hiatus, Coulson worked on a solo album entitled Electric Classical, consisting of classical pieces played on the electric guitar, which was released 20 November 2015.

Coulson left Asia in 2018 to focus on solo projects. This was announced both by the band in a tour announcement, and by Coulson himself in a Twitter post on 2 April 2019, with Coulson stating that he was looking forward to seeing the band "as a fan". Following his departure from Asia, Coulson released a second album on 15 March 2019 entitled Black Cross, consisting of original guitar compositions.

On 26 June 2019, Coulson announced via his Twitter that he had joined, as lead guitarist, the touring band for We Will Rock You - the musical based on songs by Queen - on its North American tour.

== Discography ==
Solo albums

- Electric Classical (2015)
- Black Cross (2019)

With Asia

- Gravitas (2014)
- Symfonia: Live In Bulgaria 2013 (2017; recorded 2013)
