= Fantasia: Live in Tokyo =

Live album by Asia
- Released: 21 June 2007
- Recorded: 8 March 2007
- Venues: Shinjuku Koseinenkin-Hall, Tokyo
- Genres: Progressive rock; album-oriented rock
- Length: 105:45
- Label: Eagle
- Producer: Asia

Asia chronology
Silent Nation (2004)	Fantasia: Live in Tokyo (2007)	Phoenix (2008)

Professional ratings
Review scores
Source	Rating
AllMusic	3.5/5 stars

Fantasia: Live in Tokyo is a double live album by English rock supergroup Asia, released on 21 June 2007 in Japan by WHD Entertainment and on 26 June 2007 internationally by Eagle Records.

== Track listing ==
Disc one
No.	Title	Writer(s)	Original artist	Length
1.	"Time Again"	Geoff Downes, Steve Howe, Carl Palmer, John Wetton		5:14
2.	"Wildest Dreams"	Wetton, Downes		5:36
3.	"One Step Closer"	Wetton, Howe		4:20
4.	"Roundabout"	Jon Anderson, Howe	Yes	8:41
5.	"Without You"	Wetton, Howe		5:44
6.	"Cutting It Fine"	Wetton, Downes, Howe		6:24
7.	"Intersection Blues"	Howe		3:39
8.	"Fanfare for the Common Man"	Aaron Copland	Emerson, Lake & Palmer	7:34
9.	"The Smile Has Left Your Eyes"	Wetton		3:39
Total length:				50:55

Disc two
No.	Title	Writer(s)	Original artist	Length
1.	"Don't Cry"	Wetton, Downes		4:29
2.	"In the Court of the Crimson King"	Ian McDonald, Peter Sinfield	King Crimson	5:01
3.	"Here Comes the Feeling"	Wetton, Howe		5:39
4.	"Video Killed the Radio Star"	Downes, Trevor Horn, Bruce Woolley	Buggles	4:39
5.	"The Heat Goes On"	Wetton, Downes		9:14
6.	"Only Time Will Tell"	Wetton, Downes		5:00
7.	"Sole Survivor"	Wetton, Downes		6:52
8.	"Ride Easy"	Wetton, Howe		5:27
9.	"Heat of the Moment"	Wetton, Downes		8:25
Total length:				54:50

== Personnel ==
=== Asia ===
- John Wetton – lead vocals, bass, acoustic guitar
- Steve Howe – guitars, backing vocals
- Geoff Downes – keyboards, backing vocals
- Carl Palmer – drums

=== Technical personnel ===
- Steve Rispin – audio mixing engineer (at Liscombe Park Studios, Buckinghamshire)
- Ray Staff – mastering engineer (at Alchemy Studios, London)
- Roger Dean – artwork, logotype, font
- Mike Inns – photography

== Charts ==
Chart (2007)	Peak position
Japanese Albums (Oricon)	109
