= Rare (Asia album) =

Studio album by Asia
- Released: 1999
- Studios: Loco, Monmouthshire, Wales
- Genres: Electronic; new-age; progressive rock
- Length: 49:14
- Label: Resurgence
- Producers: Geoff Downes; John Payne

Asia chronology
Axioms (1999)	Rare (1999)	The Very Best of Asia: Heat of the Moment (1982–1990) (2000)

Professional ratings
Review scores
Source	Rating
AllMusic	2.5/5 stars

Rare is the seventh studio album by English rock supergroup Asia, released in 1999 by Resurgence. The album consists of instrumental music, which keyboard player Geoff Downes and guitarist John Payne composed for the soundtrack for David Attenborough's documentary nature film Salmon: Against the Tides (tracks 1–16) and for an unreleased CD-ROM video game (tracks 17–22). "The Exodus" is an adaptation of the main theme from the film Exodus (1960).

Rare was recorded at the group's new recording studios, Loco Studios, located in Monmouthshire, Wales. It broke the tradition of naming Asia's studio albums with a title beginning and ending with the letter 'a'. However, the next album, Aura (2001), would resume this pattern.

== Track listing ==
1. "The Waterfall" – 0:56
2. "The Journey Begins" – 1:43
3. "The Seasons" – 2:12
4. "The Gods" – 1:28
5. "The Whales" – 2:16
6. "The Journey Continues" – 1:21
7. "The Reservation" – 2:58
8. "The Bears" – 2:13
9. "Under the Seas" – 1:54
10. "At the Graveyard" – 1:14
11. "Downstream" – 2:17
12. "The Ghosts" – 2:56
13. "The Sun" – 0:34
14. "The Moon" – 1:08
15. "The Sharks" – 2:34
16. "The Journey Ends" – 0:33
17. "The Indians" – 2:55
18. "The Angels" – 2:52
19. "The Horizons" – 3:13
20. "To the Deep" – 3:27
21. "The Game" – 3:52
22. "The Exodus" – 4:25

== Personnel ==
=== Asia ===
- Geoff Downes – keyboards
- John Payne – guitar, bass

=== Technical personnel ===
- L-Space Design – design, artwork
