= XXX (Asia album) =

Studio album by Asia
- Released: 20 June 2012
- Recorded: January–March 2012
- Studios: Liscombe Park, Buckinghamshire
- Genre: Progressive rock
- Length: 49:39
- Label: Frontiers
- Producer: Mike Paxman

Asia chronology
Omega (2010)	XXX (2012)	Gravitas (2014)

Singles from XXX
- 1. "Face on the Bridge" Released: 14 May 2012 (digital release)

Professional ratings
Review scores
Source	Rating
AllMusic	4.5/5 stars

XXX (pronounced "triple x") is the twelfth studio album by English rock supergroup Asia, released in 2012. It is the fifth and final studio album with the original line-up due to guitarist Steve Howe's departure the following year and vocalist/bassist John Wetton's death in 2017.

XXX was released on CD, special edition CD/DVD-Video (featuring bonus tracks, new music videos and the making of the album) and LP. To promote the album, "Face on the Bridge" was made available as a digital download single and a music video on 14 May 2012.

== Production ==
The recording sessions took place from January to March 2012 at Liscombe Park Studios, located in Buckinghamshire countryside west of Bedfordshire town Leighton Buzzard, where Asia had worked on their two previous albums. XXX was produced by Mike Paxman and engineered by Steve Rispin. The cover artwork was designed by Roger Dean, who had collaborated with Asia since their first album, released in 1982, and with Yes, which Howe and keyboard player Geoff Downes had previously been members of. Dean updated the symbolic flying dragon and orb to 2012, which is the Year of the Water Dragon in the Chinese calendar. The title of the album features the Roman numeral XXX in commemoration of the 30th anniversary of the debut album.

== Reception ==
XXX has received favorable reception from music critics and fans, with many hailing it as the group's best release since the 1980s. Matt Collar gave the album a rating of four-and-a-half stars out of five on AllMusic. "Bury Me in Willow", "No Religion" and "Face on the Bridge" were selected as three "Track Picks".

The album debuted at number 69 on the UK charts, peaking at the highest spot since Astra (1985). It reached number 33 in Germany and number 36 in Japan.

== Track listing ==
All tracks are written by John Wetton and Geoff Downes, except "No Religion" and "Judas" written by Steve Howe, Wetton and Downes.

No.	Title	Length
1.	"Tomorrow the World"	6:47
2.	"Bury Me in Willow"	6:01
3.	"No Religion"	6:36
4.	"Faithful"	5:38
5.	"I Know How You Feel"	4:54
6.	"Face on the Bridge"	6:00
7.	"Al Gatto Nero"	4:37
8.	"Judas"	4:44
9.	"Ghost of a Chance"	4:22
Total length:		49:39

Special Edition CD
No.	Title	Length
1.	"Tomorrow the World"	6:47
2.	"Bury Me in Willow"	6:01
3.	"No Religion"	6:36
4.	"Faithful"	5:38
5.	"I Know How You Feel"	4:54
6.	"Face on the Bridge"	6:00
7.	"Al Gatto Nero"	4:37
8.	"Judas"	4:44
9.	"Reno (Silver and Gold)" (bonus track)	5:16
10.	"Ghost of a Chance"	4:22
11.	"I Know How You Feel (Midnight Mix)" (bonus track)	5:24
12.	"Faithful (Orchestral Version)" (Japan bonus track)	4:55
Total length:		65:13

== Personnel ==
=== Asia ===
- John Wetton – vocals, bass guitar
- Steve Howe – electric, acoustic and steel guitars, backing vocals
- Geoff Downes – keyboards, backing vocals
- Carl Palmer – drums, percussion

=== Technical personnel ===
- Mike Paxman – producer
- Steve Rispin – engineer
- Mark "Tufty" Evans – mixing engineer (at Wispington Studios, Cookham, Berkshire)
- Secondwave − mastering
- Roger Dean – illustration, logotype

== Charts ==
Chart (2012)	Peak position
Belgian Albums (Ultratop Wallonia)	134
German Albums (Offizielle Top 100)	33
Italian Albums (FIMI)	83
Japanese Albums (Oricon)	36
Scottish Albums (Official Charts)	86
Swedish Albums (Sverigetopplistan)	39
Swiss Albums (Schweizer Hitparade)	43
UK Albums (Official Charts)	69
UK Independent Albums (Official Charts)	8
US Billboard 200	134
US Top Rock Albums (Billboard)	45
US Independent Albums (Billboard)	21
US Indie Store Album Sales (Billboard)	9

== Release history ==
Region	Date	Label	Format
Japan	20 June 2012	Avalon	CD; Special edition CD/DVD-V
Mainland Europe	29 June 2012	Frontiers	CD; Special edition CD/DVD-V; LP
United Kingdom	2 July 2012	Frontiers	CD; Special edition CD/DVD-V; LP
North America	3 July 2012	Scarecrow	Special edition CD/DVD-V
