= Indigo (Asia album) =

Studio album by Asia
- Released: 6 November 2026
- Studios: Castle (Raglan); Nave (Sabina); Curtis Schwartz Studio (Ardingly); Spiridon (Wrexham)
- Genre: Progressive rock
- Length: 65:23
- Label: Frontiers
- Producers: Geoff Downes; Asia

Asia chronology
| Gravitas (2014) | Indigo (2026) |

Indigo is the fourteenth studio album by the English rock supergroup Asia, released on 6 November 2026. It is the group's first studio album after the death of the band's co-founder John Wetton in 2017 and the first with a new line-up of Geoff Downes, Harry Whitley, John Mitchell, and Virgil Donati. Its twelve-year gap from Gravitas (2014) marks the longest between two of Asia's studio albums to date.

== Production ==
Geoff Downes played with Harry Whitley and John Mitchell at a tribute concert to the late John Wetton in 2023. This led to a new line-up of Asia, adding Virgil Donati on drums, being launched in 2024.

The main writing sessions for the album were between Downes and Whitley in 2025, although some of the material on the album, including the three-part "Tatoo Indigo", goes back to Downes and Wetton's final writing sessions in 2015-6.

== Reception ==
Rob Brown for the Edmonton Journal wrote, "There are the radio-ready songs, but also longer, more experimental pieces that allow the musicians to stretch."

== Track listing ==
Indigo track listing
| No. | Title | Writer(s) | Length |
|---|---|---|---|
| 1. | "The Traveller (Into the Light)" | Geoff Downes; Harry Whitley | 4:48 |
| 2. | "Change of Heart" | Chris Braide; Dean Johnson; Downes | 4:50 |
| 3. | "Arcadia" | Downes; Whitley | 4:41 |
| 4. | "Is This the Life?" | John Mitchell; Downes; Whitley | 4:06 |
| 5. | "Tattoo Indigo (Part 1)" | Downes; Whitley | 4:39 |
| 6. | "Tattoo Indigo (Part 2)" | John Wetton; Downes; Whitley | 2:05 |
| 7. | "Tattoo Indigo (Part 3)" | Wetton; Downes; Whitley | 4:14 |
| 8. | "Life in the Sun" | Downes; Whitley | 4:56 |
| 9. | "Hymn for the Fallen" | Downes; Whitley | 5:00 |
| 10. | "Night and Day" | Downes; Whitley | 3:30 |
| 11. | "Valencia (The Ghost Ship)" | Downey; Whitley | 3:48 |
| 12. | "An Elegy" | Downes; Whitley | 0:47 |
| 13. | "Chesapeake Bay" (featuring Steve Howe) | Wetton; Downes; Whitley | 3:00 |
| 14. | "On a Winter’s Night" | Downes; Braide | 4:39 |
| 15. | "Echo of You" | Downes; Whitley | 5:48 |
| 16. | "Tattoo Indigo (Part 3)" (bonus track; featuring Mike Portnoy) | | 4:32 |
| Total length: | | | 65:23 |

Japanese edition bonus track
| No. | Title | Writer(s) | Length |
|---|---|---|---|
| 17. | "Chesapeake Bay" (featuring John Mitchell) | Wetton; Downes; Whitley | 2:58 |
| Total length: | | | 68:21 |

== Personnel ==
These credits are adapted from the album's liner notes.

=== Asia ===
- Geoff Downes – keyboards, production, programming, arrangements
- Harry Whitley – bass, lead vocals, production, programming, arrangements
- John Mitchell – guitars, backing vocals, mixing, mastering
- Virgil Donati – drums

=== Additional contributors ===
- Steve Howe – Dobro on "Chesapeake Bay"
- Mike Portnoy – drums on "Tattoo Indigo (Part 3)"
- Curtis Schwartz – additional engineering
- Roger Dean – cover art, logos, textures
- Michael Inns – sleeve layout, artwork
- Dave Gallant – sleeve notes
- Scruffy Bear Media – photography

== Charts ==
Chart performance for Indigo
| Chart (2026) | Peak position |
|---|---|
| Austrian Albums (Ö3 Austria) | 35 |
| Belgian Albums (Ultratop Flanders) | 171 |
| French Physical Albums (SNEP) | 82 |
| French Rock & Metal Albums (SNEP) | 23 |
| German Albums (Offizielle Top 100) | 16 |
| German Rock & Metal Albums (Offizielle Top 100) | 6 |
| Japanese Albums (Oricon) | 58 |
| Japanese Digital Albums (Oricon) | 79 |
| Japanese Rock Albums (Oricon) | 18 |
| Norwegian Physical Albums (IFPI Norge) | 6 |
| Scottish Albums (Official Charts) | 31 |
| Swedish Hard Rock Albums (Sverigetopplistan) | 15 |
| Swedish Physical Albums (Sverigetopplistan) | 9 |
| Swiss Albums (Schweizer Hitparade) | 5 |
| UK Albums Sales (Official Charts) | 28 |
| UK Independent Albums (Official Charts) | 15 |
| US Top Album Sales (Billboard) | 39 |
