= Trenton War Memorial =

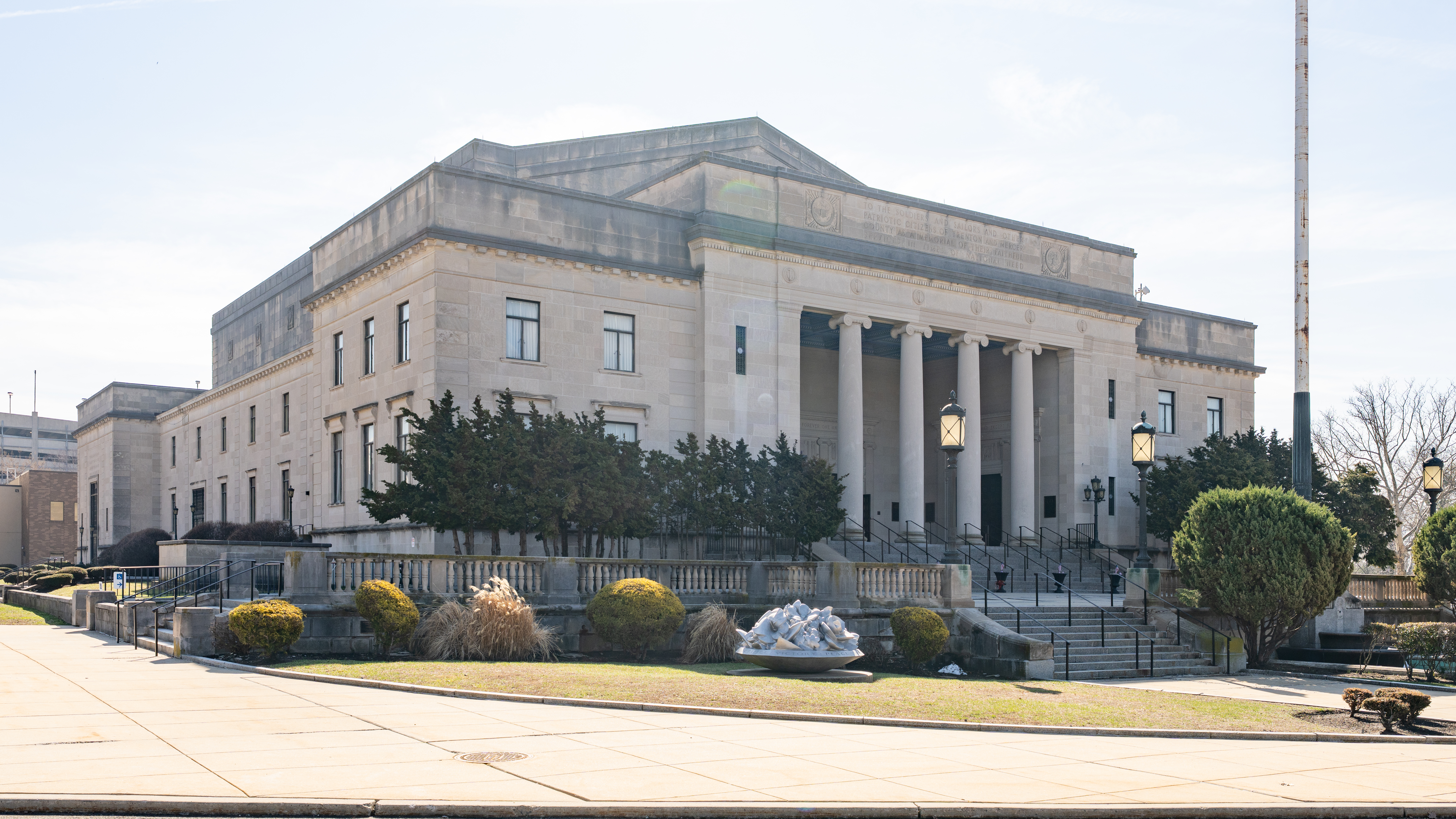
- Trenton War Memorial in 2026
- Interactive map of Trenton War Memorial
- Full name: Trenton and Mercer County War Memorial-Soldiers' and Sailors' Memorial Building
- Address: 1 Memorial Drive
- Location: Trenton, New Jersey, United States
- Coordinates: 40°13′6″N 74°46′6″W
- Owner: State of New Jersey
- Operator: New Jersey Department of State
- Capacity: 1,833 (Patriots Theater)

Construction
- Built: 1930–1932
- Opened: 1932
- Renovated: 1999
- Architect: Louis S. Kaplan

Website
- Official website
- Trenton and Mercer County War Memorial-Soldiers' and Sailors' Memorial Building
- U.S. National Register of Historic Places
- New Jersey Register of Historic Places
- Location within Mercer County, New Jersey Location within New Jersey Location within the United States
- Area: 2.7 acres (1.1 ha)
- Architectural style: Renaissance Revival, Art Deco, Italian Renaissance Revival
- NRHP reference No.: 86003480
- NJRHP No.: 1803

Significant dates
- Added to NRHP: December 11, 1986
- Designated NJRHP: November 5, 1986

The Trenton and Mercer County War Memorial-Soldiers' and Sailors' Memorial Building, commonly known as the Trenton War Memorial, is a historic performance venue and community center located in Trenton, Mercer County, New Jersey. Constructed between 1930 and 1932, it was designed by architect Louis S. Kaplan as a memorial to the county's dead from World War I. Owned by the State of New Jersey and operated by the New Jersey Department of State, the building sits within the State Capitol Complex.

The building is anchored by the 1,833-seat Patriots Theater, a fully equipped auditorium that has hosted world-class artists, ensembles, and historic state events. The War Memorial was added to the National Register of Historic Places on December 11, 1986, for its architectural and historical significance.

== History ==
In 1924, following strong public sentiment after the conclusion of World War I, Trenton Mayor Frederick W. Donnelly expanded the city's War Emergency Committee into a formal War Memorial Committee. The goal was to construct a memorial that combined "beauty, dignity, and civic utility" to honor the soldiers and sailors from Mercer County who had perished in the conflict.

A design competition was held, which was won by young local architect Louis S. Kaplan (1896–1964). Kaplan supervised the building's construction from 1930 to 1932. The success of the project established him as the leading architect in Trenton until the early 1960s.

Over the following decades, the building served as a primary concert hall and civic center but eventually fell into severe disrepair. In the 1990s, the State of New Jersey undertook a massive restoration project to return the building to its original luster, upgrading its technical capabilities while preserving its historic aesthetic. It was officially rededicated in 1999. In 2001, the primary auditorium was renamed the Patriots Theater.

The War Memorial served as the site of every gubernatorial inauguration of a first-term governor in New Jersey from 1932 to 2018.

== Architecture and design ==
The War Memorial is constructed of buff Indiana limestone and designed in a restrained Italian Renaissance Revival style with strong Art Deco influences. The structure features classical architectural forms reinterpreted with the flat, geometric planar elements characteristic of the Art Deco movement.

=== Facilities ===
In addition to its grand exterior, the building houses several formal interior spaces designed for performances, banquets, and assemblies:

- Patriots Theater: The centerpiece of the War Memorial, this grand 1,833-seat auditorium is decorated in Italian Renaissance Revival splendor. It features a large proscenium stage with a sprung oak floor and a hydraulic orchestra pit capable of accommodating 50 musicians.
  - Möller Theatre Pipe Organ: The theater is home to a 3-manual, 16-rank M. P. Möller theatre pipe organ. Originally built in 1928 for the nearby Lincoln Theatre, the instrument was rescued from demolition and moved to the War Memorial in 1974 by volunteers from the Garden State Theatre Organ Society (GSTOS). Following extensive cleaning and reassembly, the organ was officially dedicated in February 1976 with a concert by Ashley Miller. During the War Memorial's sweeping renovations in the 1990s, the GSTOS restored the organ's console, added a modern electronic relay system to make the console movable, and re-gilded the instrument to match the theater's restored aesthetics.
- George Washington Ballroom: A 4,000-square-foot space meticulously restored to vintage Art Deco elegance, used for banquets and large assemblies.
- Delaware River Room: A 3,000-square-foot room characterized by its pickled walnut wainscoting and Art Deco lighting fixtures.
- Turning Point Conference Room and Woodrow Wilson Board Room: Stately, light-filled rooms featuring polished wood floors and walnut wainscoting topped by faux-Caen stone.
- Green Room: An intimate lounge area accessible from the building's lower levels.

== Notable performances and recordings ==
Since opening in the 1930s, the War Memorial has been a premier stop for world-class entertainers and ensembles. Early in its history, it hosted performances by mid-20th-century legends such as Frank Sinatra, Duke Ellington, Louis Armstrong, and Marian Anderson. In the classical and theatrical realms, the venue has regularly welcomed prominent groups including The Philadelphia Orchestra and the American Ballet Theatre.

The venue also has a notable history of live recordings and rock-era events. During the post-World War II era, the Trenton Symphony Orchestra's performances at the War Memorial were regularly recorded and broadcast live over local radio station WTTM.

In the 1960s and 1970s, the theater became a popular stop for touring rock and pop artists. In October 1966, a concert by Simon & Garfunkel, originally slated for nearby Rider University, was moved to the War Memorial after ticket demand vastly exceeded the college gym's capacity. On November 29, 1974, Bruce Springsteen and the E Street Band played a now-famous concert at the theater; the show holds historical significance among fans and archivists as it is widely considered to be the first Springsteen concert to ever be captured by two different audience bootleg recordings.

== See also ==
- National Register of Historic Places listings in Mercer County, New Jersey
