= Days Like These (Asia song) =

Single by Asia

from the album Then & Now
- B-side: "Voice of America"
- Released: 17 August 1990
- Genre: Arena rock; pop rock
- Length: 3:47 (edit); 4:04 (LP version)
- Label: Geffen
- Songwriter: Steve Jones
- Producer: Frank Wolf

Asia singles chronology
"Go" (1985)	"Days Like These" (1990)

"Days Like These" is a song by English rock supergroup Asia, issued as a 7" single on 17 August 1990 in Europe by Geffen Records. It had previously appeared on their compilation album Then & Now, released three days before, while its B-side, "Voice of America", was derived from the third studio album, Astra (1985). In the United States, two promotion only CD singles were also available. This unusually optimistic and upbeat Asia song was a major hit on rock radio, reaching #2 on the Billboard "Mainstream Rock" chart.

"Days Like These" was written by Steve Jones, the past leader for The Unforgiven, and produced/engineered by Frank Wolf. It features Steve Lukather, Toto guitarist, and well-known studio musician on lead guitar.

In contrast to the rest of the new songs from Then & Now, "Days Like These" has been well received. On AllMusic, Tom Demalon has noted that it "nearly matches the band's strong debut material". An official music video was shot for the song and it gained considerable airplay during the summer of 1990 and was a number two hit on the Mainstream Rock chart. The single peaked at number 64 on the Billboard Hot 100 and was the last chart entry for Asia in the United States.

== Track listing ==
German 7" single (Geffen 5439-19677-7)
No.	Title	Writer(s)	Length
1.	"Days Like These"		4:04
2.	"Voice of America"	John Wetton, Geoff Downes	4:27
Total length:			8:31

US promo CD single (Geffen PRO-CD-4141)
No.	Title	Length
1.	"Days Like These" (LP version)	4:04

US promo CD single (Geffen PRO-CD-4144)
No.	Title	Length
1.	"Days Like These" (edit)	3:47
2.	"Days Like These" (LP version)	4:04
3.	"Days Like These" (AC mix)	4:05
Total length:		11:56

== Personnel ==
=== Asia ===
- John Wetton – lead vocals, backing vocals, bass
- Geoff Downes – keyboards
- Carl Palmer – drums, percussion

=== Additional musicians ===
- Steve Lukather – guitar

=== Technical personnel ===
- Frank Wolf – producer, engineer

== Charts ==
Chart (1990)	Peak position
Canada Top Singles (RPM)	31
US Billboard Hot 100	64
US Mainstream Rock Airplay (Billboard)	2
US Cash Box Top 100	55
