= Omega (Asia album) =

Studio album by Asia
- Released: 21 April 2010
- Recorded: October 2009 – February 2010
- Studios: Liscombe Park, Buckinghamshire
- Genres: Progressive rock; album-oriented rock
- Length: 61:51
- Label: Frontiers
- Producer: Mike Paxman

Asia chronology
Phoenix (2008)	Omega (2010)	XXX (2012)

Professional ratings
Review scores
Source	Rating
AllMusic	3.5/5 stars

Omega is the eleventh studio album by English rock supergroup Asia, released on 21 April 2010 in Japan by Melodious Frontier and on 23 April 2010 in Europe by Frontiers Records. It was the fourth studio recording with the original line-up and second after the reunion in 2006.

== Production ==
Omega was recorded from October 2009 to February 2010 at Steve Rispin's Liscombe Park Studios, Buckinghamshire, where Asia had already worked on their previous album, Phoenix (2008). For the first time since the debut album, released in 1982, the group employed an outside producer, Mike Paxman. The cover artwork was designed by Roger Dean, who had collaborated with Asia since their inception and with Yes, of which guitarist Steve Howe and keyboard player Geoff Downes had previously been members. The white tiger on the front cover indicates that 2010 is the Year of the Tiger in the Chinese calendar.

"Finger on the Trigger" was previously recorded by vocalist/bassist John Wetton and Downes for their collaboration studio album Icon II: Rubicon (2006).

== Reception ==
Bret Adams gave Omega a rating of three-and-a-half stars out of five on AllMusic. "Finger on the Trigger", "Holy War", "Light the Way" and "I Believe" were selected as four "Track Picks". He compared the album with the previous one and summarized that "Phoenix has better songs overall than Omega — probably due to the initial excitement and creative surge spawned by the reunion — but Omega satisfies, and longtime fans will enjoy it".

The album did not sell well, failing to chart in both United Kingdom and United States, but reached number 29 in Japan, where Asia were always a popular foreign act.

== Track listing ==
All tracks are written by John Wetton and Geoff Downes, except where noted.

European release
No.	Title	Writer(s)	Length
1.	"Finger on the Trigger"		4:30
2.	"Through My Veins"	Steve Howe, Wetton	5:08
3.	"Holy War"		5:59
4.	"Ever Yours"		4:04
5.	"Listen, Children"		5:56
6.	"End of the World"		5:39
7.	"Light the Way"	Howe, Wetton	5:09
8.	"Emily" (bonus track)		5:12
9.	"I'm Still the Same"		4:43
10.	"There Was a Time"		5:58
11.	"I Believe"		4:42
12.	"Don't Wanna Lose You Now"		4:45
Total length:			61:51

Japanese release
No.	Title	Writer(s)	Length
1.	"Finger on the Trigger"		4:30
2.	"Through My Veins"	Steve Howe, Wetton	5:09
3.	"Holy War"		6:00
4.	"Ever Yours"		4:05
5.	"Listen, Children"		5:57
6.	"End of the World"		5:39
7.	"Light the Way"	Howe, Wetton	5:10
8.	"I'm Still the Same"		4:44
9.	"There Was a Time"		5:57
10.	"Drop a Stone" (bonus track)	Wetton, Downes, Howe, Carl Palmer	5:09
11.	"I Believe"		4:43
12.	"Don't Wanna Lose You Now"		4:46
Total length:			61:47

== Personnel ==
=== Asia ===
- John Wetton – vocals, bass guitar
- Steve Howe – electric, acoustic and steel guitars
- Geoff Downes – keyboards
- Carl Palmer – drums, percussion

=== Technical personnel ===
- Mike Paxman – producer
- Steve Rispin – engineer
- Mark "Tufty" Evans – mixing engineer (at Wispington Studios, Cookham, Berkshire)
- Secondwave − mastering
- Roger Dean – cover, logotype, inside painting
- Martyn Dean – computer work, cover design
- Michael Inns – photography
- Karen Gladwell – artwork

== Charts ==
Chart (2010)	Peak position
German Albums (Offizielle Top 100)	56
French Albums (SNEP)	158
Japanese Albums (Oricon)	29
Swedish Albums (Sverigetopplistan)	47
Swiss Albums (Schweizer Hitparade)	55
UK Independent Albums (Official Charts)	13
