= Anthology (Asia album) =

Compilation album by Asia
- Released: 1997
- Recorded: 1992−97
- Genres: Progressive rock; album-oriented rock
- Length: 74:07
- Labels: Snapper Music; InsideOut Music
- Producers: John Payne; Geoffrey Downes

Asia chronology
Archiva 2 (1996)	Anthology (1997)	Axioms (1999)

Anthology is a compilation by English rock supergroup Asia highlighting the John Payne era up to 1997. Re-recordings of John Wetton-era material were prompted by a lawsuit filed by Wetton when the original versions were used on the initial release in Japan. New versions were allowed, as well as two original songs: "Different Worlds," and a cover of the GTR track, "The Hunter".

== Track listing ==
1. "The Hunter" (Downes)
2. "Only Time Will Tell" (Wetton, Downes)
3. "Arena" (Downes, Payne)
4. "Anytime" (Downes, Payne)
5. "Don't Cry" (Wetton, Downes)
6. "Aqua Part 1" (Downes, Payne, Howe)
7. "Who Will Stop the Rain?" (Downes, Warman, Woolfenden)
8. "The Heat Goes On" (Wetton, Downes)
9. "Two Sides of the Moon" (Downes, Payne)
10. "Reality" (Downes, Payne)
11. "Go" (Wetton, Downes)
12. "Feels Like Love" (Downes, Payne)
13. "Someday" (Downes, Warman)
14. "Heat of the Moment" (Wetton, Downes)
15. "Military Man" (Downes, Payne)
16. "Different Worlds" (Downes, Payne)
17. "Time Again (acoustic)" (Downes, Wetton, Howe, Palmer) - bonus track

== Credits ==
Asia:

- Geoffrey Downes: keyboards (1–17), backing vocals (2, 14)
- John Payne: bass (1–16), vocals (1–5, 7–17), guitars (1, 4–5, 11, 14–17)
- Michael Sturgis: drums (1–5, 7–16), percussion (2, 14)

Guest musicians:

- Elliot Randall: guitars (2–3, 9)
- Al Pitrelli: guitar (4, 7, 10, 12–13, 15)
- Steve Howe: guitar (6, 7, 13)
- Aziz Ibrahim: guitar (8–9, 11)
