= Gravitas (Asia album) =

Studio album by Asia
- Released: 21 March 2014
- Recorded: 2013
- Studios: Liscombe Park, Buckinghamshire
- Genre: Progressive rock
- Length: 47:46
- Label: Frontiers
- Producers: John Wetton; Geoff Downes

Asia chronology
XXX (2012)	Gravitas (2014)	Indigo (2026)

Professional ratings
Review scores
Source	Rating
AllMusic	3/5 stars
PopMatters	5/10

Gravitas is the thirteenth studio album by English rock supergroup Asia, released on 21 March 2014 in Europe, and 25 March 2014 in North America. It is the group's final studio album with vocalist/bassist John Wetton before his death in 2017 and the only one to feature guitarist Sam Coulson.

Gravitas was released on CD, deluxe edition CD/DVD-Video (featuring bonus tracks, the "Valkyrie" music video, the making of the album and three tracks recorded live with a full symphonic orchestra in Plovdiv, Bulgaria) and LP. A music video for "Valkyrie" was shot in January 2014 in Los Angeles.

== Production ==
Asia began to work on the new album in the end of June 2013. As this time they decided not to invite an outside producer, it was produced by Wetton and keyboard player Geoff Downes. The instruments were recorded at Steve Rispin's Liscombe Park Studios, located in Buckinghamshire countryside west of Bedfordshire town Leighton Buzzard, where the group had worked on all their previous studio recordings since the reunion in 2006. The vocals were done at Aubitt Studios in Southampton, Hampshire, by Rob Aubrey. The album was mixed and mastered by John Mitchell at Outhouse Studios in Reading, Berkshire, from October to December 2013. "I Would Die for You" was written by Wetton and Downes in 1986 as opposed to the rest of the songs, which were composed in 2013.

Gravitas was originally announced under the name of Valkyrie, but the title was later changed. The cover artwork was designed by Roger Dean, who had collaborated with Asia since their debut album, released in 1982.

== Reception ==
Matt Collar gave the album a rating of three stars out of five on AllMusic. He noted that "Asia have always moved back and forth between their radio-friendly pop side and more classical-influenced progressive side" and Gravitas "bends more toward the latter, showcasing Downes and Wetton's longstanding partnership as thoughtful songwriters and technically proficient arrangers". "Valkyrie", "Nyctophobia" and "I Would Die for You" were selected as three "Track Picks".

Gravitas was less successful in terms of sales than its predecessor, but still managed to reach the UK Albums Chart and the US Billboard 200.

== Track listing ==
All tracks are written by Geoff Downes and John Wetton.

No.	Title	Length
1.	"Valkyrie"	5:26
2.	"Gravitas": (i). "Lento"; (ii). "Gravitas"	8:00
3.	"The Closer I Get to You"	6:38
4.	"Nyctophobia"	5:12
5.	"Russian Dolls"	5:06
6.	"Heaven Help Me Now": (i). "Wings of Angels"; (ii). "Prelude"; (iii.) "Heaven Help Me Now"	5:39
7.	"I Would Die for You"	3:11
8.	"Joe DiMaggio's Glove"	4:31
9.	"Till We Meet Again"	4:04
Total length:		47:46

Japanese standard edition bonus track
No.	Title	Length
10.	"Russian Dolls" (acoustic)	4:47
Total length:		52:33

European and North American deluxe edition bonus tracks
No.	Title	Length
10.	"The Closer I Get to You" (acoustic)	6:41
11.	"Joe DiMaggio's Glove" (acoustic)	4:34
Total length:		59:01

Japanese deluxe edition bonus tracks
No.	Title	Length
10.	"The Closer I Get to You" (acoustic)	6:41
11.	"Joe DiMaggio's Glove" (acoustic)	4:34
12.	"Russian Dolls" (acoustic)	4:47
Total length:		63:48

== Personnel ==
=== Asia ===
- John Wetton – lead vocal, acoustic and bass guitars; producer
- Geoff Downes – keyboards; producer
- Sam Coulson – guitars
- Carl Palmer – drums

=== Additional musicians ===
- Katinka Kleijn – cello (on "Valkyrie")

=== Technical personnel ===
- Steve Rispin – engineer
- Rob Aubrey – engineer (vocals) (at Aubitt Studios, Southampton, Hampshire)
- John Mitchell – mixing and mastering engineer (at Outhouse Studios, Reading, Berkshire)
- Devin DeHaven – producer and director ("Valkyrie" music video and the making of Gravitas)
- Roger Dean – paintings, logotypes
- Michael Inns – photography
- John Price – photography

== Charts ==
Chart (2014)	Peak position
Belgian Albums (Ultratop Wallonia)	135
German Albums (Offizielle Top 100)	51
Japanese Albums (Oricon)	42
Swiss Albums (Schweizer Hitparade)	24
UK Albums (Official Charts)	92
UK Independent Albums (Official Charts)	16
US Billboard 200	159
US Top Rock Albums (Billboard)	45

== Release history ==
Region	Date	Label	Format
Japan	19 March 2014	Ward	CD; Deluxe edition CD/DVD-V
Europe	21 March 2014	Frontiers	CD; Deluxe edition CD/DVD-V
Europe	21 March 2014	Soulfood	LP
North America	25 March 2014	Frontiers	CD; Deluxe edition CD/DVD-V
