= Aura (Asia album) =

Studio album by Asia
- Released: 31 January 2001 (Japan)
- Recorded: 2000
- Studios: Loco, Monmouthshire, Wales
- Genres: Progressive rock; album-oriented rock; art rock
- Length: 63:12
- Label: Recognition
- Producers: Simon Hanhart; Asia

Asia chronology
The Very Best of Asia: Heat of the Moment (1982-1990) (2000)	Aura (2001)	Silent Nation (2004)

Professional ratings
Review scores
Source	Rating
The Daily Vault	C+

Aura is the eighth studio album by English rock supergroup Asia. As a result of the diverse array of guest musicians, Aura had a wide mix of sounds with some songs trying to replicate Asia's earlier style, while others retained the more acoustic Latin production started by Arena five years prior.

== Production ==
Aura began recording in 1999 at Loco Studios located in the village of Llanhennock in Monmouthshire, Wales. The group had gotten reduced to the duo of singer-songwriter John Payne and musician Geoff Downes by this time, and they were determined to create a new sort of supergroup around Aura by bringing in multiple guest artists to collaborate with them. Examples include Tony Levin, Elliott Randall, and Chris Slade. Original member Steve Howe even featured on the songs "The Last Time" and "Free". It was produced by the band itself alongside Simon Hanhart, an audio engineer who had previously produced work by groups such as Babylon A.D., Saxon, and Whitecross. A stable line-up would eventually be established from this, with guitarist Guthrie Govan and drummer Chris Slade becoming mainstays until 2006.

The lyrics for "Awake" were adapted from "The Rubaiyat" of Omar Khayyam. The lyrics for "The Longest Night" were inspired by Wilfred Owen's poem of 1918. "Ready to Go Home" was written by Andrew Gold and Graham Gouldman of 10cc and appeared on Mirror Mirror (1995).

Geoff Downes had mixed feelings about the album's production. He stated "It was good to start with, but I think because of the duration of the album - at the end of it we felt it had gone in a slightly different direction than we wanted it to. In hindsight, sometimes these things happen."

The cover artwork was designed by Roger Dean, who had collaborated with Asia since their inception.

== Release ==
Aura was originally meant to be released in August 2000, but scheduling conflicts with Recognition Records pushed it back to January 31, 2001, initially available in Japan before coming to the UK on February 12. The album had numerous editions, including the standard jewel case CD issue, a limited Digipak CD edition with three bonus tracks, and a limited vinyl release. In the United States, the album was issued by Windstorm Records, a division of Blue Storm Music, and also included the three bonus tracks. In 2007, Aura was re-issued by Acadia, a label of Evangeline Records. This added a bonus CD which featured an acoustic performance by Steve Howe, recorded live at the Chestnut Cabaret in Philadelphia on 21 November 1992. "Wherever You Are" was released as a promotional single, backed with "Under the Gun", which both received some airplay. Two songs originally written for the album, "Never the Way" and "Innocence" were included on Armada 1, the band's first fan club exclusive EP released in 2002.

== Reception ==
Although the sound of Aura can be described as radio-friendly, it did not perform well on the charts and is one of the group's lowest-selling studio albums. This may have been partly due to Recognition Records, which went bankrupt within a year after the album was released.

Critically, Aura received generally positive reviews. Dave Ling wrote in his review for Classic Rock magazine: "Among the standouts is Ready to Go Home, a beautifully restrained track written by Andrew Gold and 10cc's Graham Gouldman. But consistency is the album's key, and Awake, You're the Stranger, The Last Time, and the yearning The Longest Night are all songs from the very top drawer. Musically, Downes and Payne have chosen their contributors well. They seem to have an intuitive awareness of which players would fit certain songs." Conversely, the magazine Wonderous Stories wrote "From the excellent opener Awake, where Geoff and John are joined by Michael Sturgis again on drums, through the concluding title track, the album is full of strengths and no weaknesses in sight." Christopher Thelen of The Daily Vault was more ambivalent towards the album. While noting that the amount of guest musicians made the album lack cohesion, he cited the tracks "Forgive Me" and "Free" as highlights.

== Track listing ==
No.	Title	Writer(s)	Length
1.	"Awake"	Geoff Downes, John Payne	6:01
2.	"Wherever You Are"	Andrew Gold, Graham Gouldman, Downes, Payne	4:48
3.	"Ready to Go Home"	Gold, Gouldman	4:48
4.	"The Last Time"	Downes, Payne	4:58
5.	"Forgive Me"	Jimmy Santis, Richard Tancredi, Downes, Payne	5:24
6.	"Kings of the Day"	Downes, Payne	6:42
7.	"On the Coldest Day in Hell"	Downes, Payne, Ben Woolfenden	6:26
8.	"Free"	Downes, Payne	8:13
9.	"You're the Stranger"	Downes, Payne	5:47
10.	"The Longest Night"	Downes, Payne, Woolfenden	5:21
11.	"Aura"	Downes, Payne, Elliott Randall	4:45
Total length:			63:12

Bonus tracks
No.	Title	Writer(s)	Length
12.	"Under the Gun"	Downes, Payne	4:50
13.	"Come Make My Day"	Downes, Payne, Ian Crichton	5:02
14.	"Hands of Time"	Downes, Payne	6:31
Total length:			79:35

== Personnel ==
=== Asia ===
- John Payne – lead vocals, bass, guitar
- Geoff Downes – keyboards

=== Additional musicians ===
- Neil Lockwood – backing vocals
- Gary Liederman – bass

"Awake"

- Guthrie Govan – guitars
- Michael Sturgis – drums
- Luis Jardim – percussion
- David Grant's Gospel Choir – choir

"Wherever You Are"

- Guthrie Govan – guitars
- Chris Slade – drums

"Ready to Go Home"

- Guthrie Govan – guitars
- Tony Levin – bass
- Vinnie Colaiuta – drums
- Luis Jardim – percussion
- David Grant's Gospel Choir – choir

"The Last Time"

- Steve Howe – guitars
- Ian Crichton – guitars
- Vinnie Colaiuta – drums
- Luis Jardim – percussion

"Forgive Me"

- Guthrie Govan – guitars
- Michael Sturgis – drums
- Luis Jardim – percussion

"Kings of the Day"

- Guthrie Govan – guitars
- Simon Phillips – drums
- Luis Jardim – percussion

"On the Coldest Day in Hell"

- Guthrie Govan – guitars
- Michael Sturgis – drums

"Free"

- Steve Howe – guitars
- Ian Crichton – guitars
- Pat Thrall – guitars
- Simon Phillips – drums

"You're the Stranger"

- Elliott Randall – guitars
- Guthrie Govan – guitars
- Michael Sturgis – drums
- Luis Jardim – percussion

"The Longest Night"

- Guthrie Govan – guitars
- Vinnie Colaiuta – drums

"Aura"

- Elliott Randall – guitars
- Michael Sturgis – drums
- Luís Jardim – percussion

"Under the Gun"

- Ian Crichton – guitars
- Chris Slade – drums

"Come Make My Day"

- Ian Crichton – guitars
- Chris Slade – drums

"Hands of Time"

- Ian Crichton – guitars
- Chris Slade – drums

=== Technical personnel ===
- Simon Hanhart – producer, engineer, mixing engineer
- Ray Staff – mastering engineer (at Whitfield Studios, London)
- Roger Dean – painting, lettering
- Martyn Dean – booklet design
