= Phoenix (Asia album) =

Studio album by Asia
- Released: 11 April 2008
- Recorded: September 2007 – February 2008
- Studios: Liscombe Park, Buckinghamshire
- Genres: Progressive rock; album-oriented rock
- Length: 65:01
- Labels: Frontiers (Europe); Capitol (US); EMI (Canada)
- Producers: Asia; Steve Rispin

Asia chronology
| Fantasia: Live in Tokyo (2007) | Phoenix (2008) | Omega (2010) |

Professional ratings
Review scores
| Source | Rating |
|---|---|
| AllMusic | 4/5 stars |

Phoenix is the tenth studio album by English rock supergroup Asia, released in 2008. It was the first studio recording with the original line-up after the reunion in 2006.

== Reception ==
Phoenix was seen as somewhat polarizing. News and review site Vintagerock was positive towards the album, stating that the band had matured significantly over the years. "Superior musicianship and great songs never go out of style, and while it’s illogical to think Phoenix could ascend to the heights of the group’s debut from 1982, the record succeeds by remaining true to its purpose. If this release is a set up for things to come, then we could be seeing some more new and wondrous music from Asia." Allmusic was also generally positive towards the album, with a 4/5 rating that compared it favorably to Asia's first two albums. On the other hand, Variety criticized it for that very same reason, going on to say that "What’s sorely missing this time out is the pop/rock catchiness of the aforementioned “Heat” and “Only Time Will Tell” which carried the band to unexpected success back in the day. An excess of syrupy Muzak-like ballads such as ”Heroine” and “I Will Remember You” and little actual rock only serve to remind that you not only can't but really shouldn't go home again." Glide Magazine also panned the album. "Because Phoenix has practically no redeeming quality, it seems Asia’s debut is to be sadly relegated to something I like despite itself. Phoenix doesn’t even fare that well, because there is simply no pleasure, guilty or otherwise. I guess everything that rises from the ashes isn’t good."

== Track listing ==
All tracks are written by John Wetton and Geoff Downes, except where noted.

| No. | Title | Writer(s) | Length |
|---|---|---|---|
| 1. | "Never Again" | | 4:55 |
| 2. | "Nothing's Forever" | Wetton | 5:46 |
| 3. | "Heroine" | | 4:54 |
| 4. | "Sleeping Giant / No Way Back / Reprise" | | 8:10 |
| 5. | "Alibis" | Downes, Steve Howe, Carl Palmer, Wetton | 5:40 |
| 6. | "I Will Remember You" | | 5:12 |
| 7. | "Shadow of a Doubt" | | 4:18 |
| 8. | "Parallel Worlds / Vortex / Déyà" | | 8:13 |
| 9. | "Wish I'd Known All Along" | Howe | 4:07 |
| 10. | "Orchard of Mines" | Jeffrey Fayman, Daniel Pursey | 5:12 |
| 11. | "Over and Over" | Howe | 3:34 |
| 12. | "An Extraordinary Life" | | 4:59 |
| Total length: | | | 65:01 |

European limited edition bonus track
| No. | Title | Length |
|---|---|---|
| 13. | "An Extraordinary Life" (acoustic remix) | 4:16 |
| Total length: | | 69:17 |

Japanese limited edition bonus track
| No. | Title | Length |
|---|---|---|
| 13. | "I Will Remember You" (acoustic remix) | 5:14 |
| Total length: | | 70:15 |

== Personnel ==
=== Asia ===
- John Wetton – lead and backing vocals, bass guitar
- Steve Howe – electric, acoustic and steel guitars, harmony vocals on "Wish I'd Known All Along"
- Geoff Downes – keyboards
- Carl Palmer – drums, percussion

=== Additional musician ===
- Hugh McDowell – cello (on "I Will Remember You" and "An Extraordinary Life")

=== Technical personnel ===
- Steve Rispin – co-producer, engineer, mixing engineer (tracks 2, 4, 6, 7, 10, bonus tracks)
- Simon Hanhart – mixing engineer (tracks 1 (European edition), 3, 12)
- Curtis Schwartz – mixing engineer (tracks 5, 8, 9, 11)
- John X. Volaitis – mixing engineer (on "Never Again" (U.S. edition))
- John Dent – mastering engineer (at Loud Mastering, Taunton, Somerset) (European edition)
- Evren Göknar – mastering engineer (at Capitol Mastering, Hollywood, Los Angeles) (U.S. edition)
- Roger Dean – cover logotype, inside painting
- Martyn Dean – computer work, cover design
- Michael Inns – photography
- Karen Gladwell – artwork

== Charts ==
| Chart (2008) | Peak position |
|---|---|
| German Albums (Offizielle Top 100) | 58 |
| Japanese Albums (Oricon) | 27 |
| Swedish Albums (Sverigetopplistan) | 38 |
| Swiss Albums (Schweizer Hitparade) | 75 |
| UK Independent Albums (Official Charts) | 10 |
| US Billboard 200 | 73 |

| Chart (2016) | Peak position |
|---|---|
| UK Progressive Albums (Official Charts) | 30 |

== Release history ==
| Region | Date | Label | Format |
|---|---|---|---|
| Europe | 11 April 2008 | Frontiers | CD; Limited edition enhanced CD |
| Canada | 15 April 2008 | EMI | CD |
| US | 15 April 2008 | Capitol | CD |
| Japan | 23 April 2008 | Melodious Frontier | Limited edition enhanced CD |
| Worldwide | 29 April 2016 | Asia Music | Special edition double CD |
