= Asia (band) =

English rock band

- Original lineup in 1982; (clockwise from bottom left): John Wetton, Carl Palmer, Geoff Downes, Steve Howe

Background information
- Origin: London, England
- Genres: Progressive rock; AOR; pop rock
- Works: Discography
- Years active: 1981–1986; 1989–present
- Labels: Geffen; Great Pyramid; Musidisc; WEA Japan; Mayhem Recordings; Resurgence; Snapper; Inside Out; Frontiers; EMI America; King; Sony Music Entertainment
- Spinoffs: Qango; GTR; Wetton/Downes; Asia featuring John Payne; Dukes of the Orient
- Members: Geoff Downes; John Mitchell; Harry Whitley; Virgil Donati
- Past members: Carl Palmer; John Wetton; Steve Howe; Greg Lake; Mandy Meyer; Pat Thrall; John Payne; Al Pitrelli; Mike Sturgis; Chris Slade; Guthrie Govan; Jay Schellen; Sam Coulson; Billy Sherwood; Ron "Bumblefoot" Thal; Marc Bonilla
- Website: originalasia.com

Asia are an English rock supergroup formed in London in 1981. The most commercially successful lineup was its original, which consisted of four members of different progressive rock bands who had enjoyed great success in the 1970s: lead vocalist and bassist John Wetton (King Crimson, Uriah Heep and U.K.), guitarist Steve Howe (Yes), keyboardist Geoff Downes (Yes and the Buggles) and drummer Carl Palmer (Atomic Rooster and Emerson, Lake & Palmer, itself a supergroup). Their self-titled debut album, released in 1982, remains their best-selling album and went to number one in several countries. Billboard listed it as the top album in the U.S. in 1982. The lead single from the album, "Heat of the Moment", remains their top charting and best-known song, reaching the top 40 in over a dozen markets. It peaked at No. 4 in the U.S. on the Billboard Hot 100 and hit No. 1 on the Billboard Mainstream Rock chart.

The band underwent multiple lineup changes before the original four members reunited in 2006. As a result, a band called Asia featuring John Payne exists as a continuation of John Payne's career as Asia's frontman from 1991 until Wetton's return in 2006. In 2013, the original lineup was broken once again when Howe retired from the band and was replaced by guitarist Sam Coulson. After a few years of inactivity, Billy Sherwood (of Yes, World Trade and Circa:) replaced an ailing Wetton (who died shortly thereafter) in Asia for a summer 2017 tour with Journey. Following the end of the tour, the band went on hiatus again, re-emerging in 2019 with Ron "Bumblefoot" Thal replacing both Sherwood on vocals and Coulson on guitar. In 2022, Marc Bonilla joined the group as guitarist and vocalist in place of Thal, but this brief lineup of the band never performed or recorded together. In 2024, Downes announced a new touring line-up of himself, Virgil Donati, John Mitchell and Harry Whitley.

== History ==
=== Formation ===
Asia began in early 1981 after the apparent ending of Yes and Emerson, Lake & Palmer, two of the founding bands of British progressive rock. After the breakup of King Crimson in 1974, various plans for a supergroup involving bassist John Wetton had not been successful, including the abortive British Bulldog project with Bill Bruford and Rick Wakeman in 1976. In 1977 Bruford and Wetton were reunited in U.K., augmented by guitarist Allan Holdsworth and keyboardist/violinist Eddie Jobson. Their self-titled debut was released in 1978. But by January 1980, U.K. had folded after one lineup change and three recordings. A new project was then suggested involving Wetton, Wakeman, drummer Carl Palmer and (then little known) guitarist/singer Trevor Rabin, but Wakeman left this project shortly before they were due to sign to Geffen and before they had played together.

In early January 1981, Wetton and former Yes guitarist Steve Howe were brought together by A&R man John Kalodner and Geffen Records to start writing material for a new album. They were eventually joined by Palmer and finally by Howe's fellow member of Yes, keyboardist Geoff Downes. Two other players auditioned and considered during the band's formation were former The Move and ELO founder Roy Wood and the aforementioned guitarist/singer Trevor Rabin, who would end up replacing Steve Howe in a reformed Yes in 1983. Rabin, in a filmed 1984 interview included in the DVD 9012Live, said that his involvement with Asia never went anywhere because "there was no chemistry" among the participants.

The band's first recordings, under the auspices of Geffen record label head David Geffen and Kalodner, were extremely popular with record buyers, while considered disappointing by music critics and fans of progressive rock, who found the music closer to radio-friendly album-oriented rock (AOR). However, Asia clicked with fans of popular arena acts such as Journey and Styx; Kalodner had once introduced Wetton to Journey's short-term frontman Robert Fleischman, with a view to Fleischman becoming Asia's lead singer. As they worked on material together, Fleischman was impressed by Wetton's singing and felt the voice best suited to the new material was Wetton's own. He left Asia amicably.

Rolling Stone gave Asia an indifferent review, while acknowledging the band's musicianship was a cut above the usual AOR expectations.

=== 1981–1985: "Heat of the Moment" and early success ===
Asia's debut album Asia, released in March 1982, gained considerable commercial success, spending nine weeks at number one on the United States album chart and selling over four million copies in the States alone. The album sold over 10 million worldwide and has never been out of print. The singles "Heat of the Moment" and "Only Time Will Tell" became Top 40 hits, both boosted by popular MTV music videos. Both tracks went on to become stadium favourites at United States sporting events. "Sole Survivor" also received heavy air play on rock stations across the United States, as did "Wildest Dreams" (another MTV video) and "Here Comes The Feeling". The band's best performing single, and perhaps their most recognised and popular hit song, "Heat of the Moment", spent six weeks at No. 1 on Billboard's Album Rock Tracks chart and climbed to No. 4 on the Hot 100.

In the United States the band sold out every date on their debut tour, which began at Clarkson University in Potsdam, New York on 22 April 1982 and continued in theatres but quickly expanded into massive arenas because of high ticket demand. Asia would go on to receive a Grammy Award nomination as Best New Artist of 1982. MTV also played Asia videos on heavy rotation—as many as five times a day. Both Billboard and Cash Box named Asia's debut the No. 1 album of the year. Asia's logo and cover art were created by illustrator Roger Dean.

Asia's second album Alpha (released in August 1983) and future Asia albums did not achieve the chart success of their debut release; however, Alpha's "Don't Cry" was a No. 1 Album Rock Track and Top 10 Pop hit in the summer of 1983, and the video received considerable attention on MTV, while "The Smile Has Left Your Eyes" was another Top 40 hit for the band. The video for "Smile" also scored heavy MTV play. However, Rolling Stone criticized Alpha as an "over-produced commercial album", while others stated that Howe and Palmer were effectively reduced to session musicians. Alpha received indifferent reviews from various critics, while attaining platinum status and reaching No. 6 on the Billboard album chart.

In October 1983 Wetton left the group after the comparatively disappointing sales of Alpha. The band says that Wetton quit; Wetton stated that he was fired by phone. There is no universally agreed version of what happened. Wetton later said that his alcohol dependency may have been a factor. Howe, in his 2021 autobiography All My Yesterdays, says that tensions had been building gradually, as songs began to work out differently on stage than they had while recording the album, which had itself not gone smoothly. After a show in New York where some members of the band had, after giving an interview, taken the stage and given a subpar performance, Howe recalls that he, Downes and Palmer confronted Wetton about his increasing mistakes on stage.

The next leg of their 1983 United States tour (which had begun in the summer but shut down suddenly on 10 September following a performance at Pine Knob outside Detroit, Michigan), scheduled for the autumn, was abruptly cancelled, reportedly because of low ticket sales. Howe says this was because Wetton's issues had worsened; the ensuing two-month break in the tour marked Wetton's departure from the band as a practical matter regardless of who had initiated it.

In December 1983, Greg Lake on bass guitar and lead vocals replaced Wetton for a few concerts in Japan. Lake's tenure included the highly publicised "Asia in Asia" concert at the Nippon Budokan Hall in Tokyo, Japan, on 6 December 1983, which was the first concert broadcast over satellite to MTV in the United States and was later made into a home video. Some songs were played in a different key to better suit Lake's voice. He sang some lyrics assisted with a teleprompter, as he was not familiar with the material and had been asked to substitute for Wetton on short notice as a favour to Carl Palmer (his bandmate in Emerson, Lake and Palmer). Initially, Lake declined due to the short preparation time, but eventually he accepted because Geffen Records "offered me so much money there was no way I could refuse it." In a 2011 interview, asked why he had not stayed a member of Asia, he stated, "I did a brief stint with them and didn't want to go in that corporate rock direction. I didn't believe in that sort of music, so I didn't continue." Howe contradicts Lake on this point, saying Lake was in fact interested in remaining a member and recording with the band but Palmer was opposed.

Following Lake's departure in early 1984, Wetton was asked to return. In Howe's account, Wetton approached the band via management after a three-month absence; he returned on the condition that Howe be ousted from the band. For a while, the group considered continuing as a three-piece without a permanent guitarist, inviting guest guitarists such as Jeff Beck and David Gilmour into the studio. Geffen Records suggested recruiting Mandy Meyer of Krokus, who got on well with the band and was offered a permanent position. His playing style was more inclined to straightforward hard rock, thus changing the sound of the band. Meanwhile, Howe went on to brief success with GTR (another supergroup, this one formed with former Genesis guitarist Steve Hackett and produced by Geoff Downes).

=== 1985–1991: Astra, breakup and new lineups ===
The third Asia album was tentatively titled Arcadia, but during production it was discovered that that name was being used by a forthcoming spin-off project from Duran Duran. The retitled Astra, released in November 1985, was not as commercially successful as the first two albums. The record label cancelled the planned tour because of lack of interest. The band charted another single with "Go" (No. 46), featuring Meyer's guitar work as a primary element. The music video was another hit with MTV but in 1986 this Asia lineup folded, bringing the group to an end for the time being. Wetton is quoted as saying "[Astra] did really well in Sweden ... but Swedish sales aren't that large."

Wetton resurfaced in January 1987 with an album recorded with guitarist Phil Manzanera, Wetton-Manzanera, based on material that had been originally intended for Asia. Also in 1987, Wetton played with Phenomena on their Dream Runner album and landed a number one hit in South America with the Phenomena single "Did It All for Love", also appearing in the related music video.

Asia were also credited with contributing the Giorgio Moroder produced track "Gypsy Soul" to the Sylvester Stallone film soundtrack to Over the Top (1987), although Wetton was the only band member involved.

Wetton and Downes' attempt to restart the group in 1987 with guitarist Scott Gorham (formerly of Thin Lizzy) and drummer Michael Sturgis (ex-A-ha) failed when they were unable to land a worldwide recording deal.

Wetton and Palmer reunited the band for tours of Europe in the summer and autumn of 1989. Downes (working on a project with Greg Lake) was not available, so keyboards were played by John Young. Guitars on the tour were handled by Alan Darby (replaced by German guitarist Holger Larisch); and Zoe Nicholas and Susie Webb were brought aboard to provide back-up vocals. Unlike Wetton's later anger at Asia continuing without him in the 1990s, this lineup was viewed favourably by other Asia band members.

Asia returned to the studio in 1990 with Downes, Toto guitarist Steve Lukather and other studio musicians and released Then & Now (August 1990), a best-of with four new tracks. "Days Like These" from the disc received substantial airplay during the summer of 1990 on AOR radio stations and re-sparked some interest in the band. Lukather later revealed that Wetton had asked him to join the band, but he had obligations with Toto who at that time had recently come off of a short hiatus. Lukather later contributed to Wetton's solo album Battle Lines in 1994. Instead, Pat Thrall joined Downes, Palmer and Wetton on tour and they performed classic material, including King Crimson and U.K. songs.

The band toured the former Soviet Union in November 1990 to play in front of 20,000 fans on two sold-out nights. "Days Like These" charted in the United States at No. 64 in 1990 and No. 2 on the United States Album Rock Tracks chart. But a U.S. tour was scrapped when various problems hampered the single's chance at the Top 40. Asia received the RIAA Gold album award for Then and Now years later, but initially the album did not reach the Top 100. A DVD and CD are available of the Asia concerts in the USSR (featuring a bonus studio track, "Kari-Anne" recorded by the 1987 Wetton-Downes-Gorham-Sturgis lineup and with Francis Dunnery contributing a guitar solo). Wetton left the group in April 1991 after a South American tour, discouraged by Asia's lack of success in the United States.

=== 1991–2006: Downes/Payne era ===
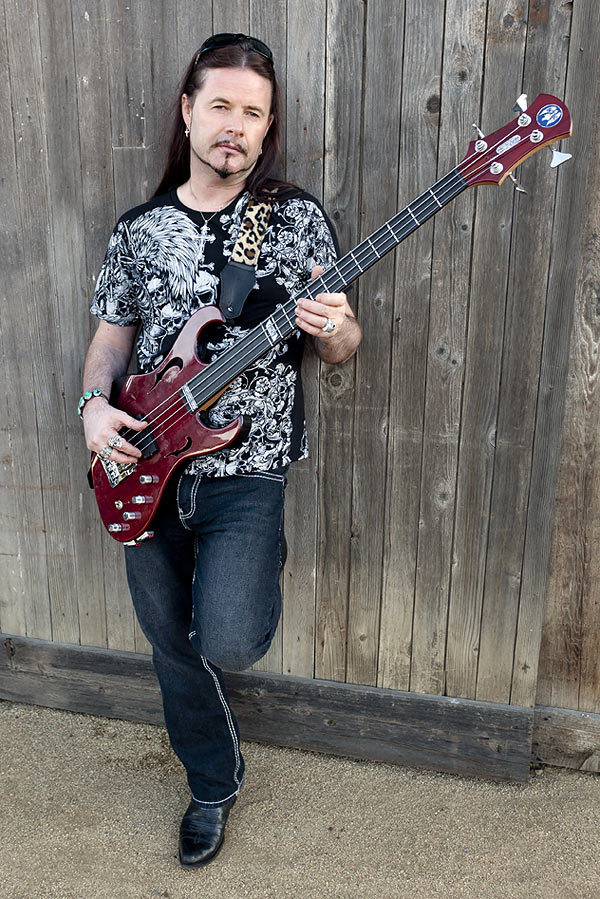
John Payne (pictured in 2011) replaced John Wetton as Asia's frontman between 1991 and 2006, and now continues with the spin-off group, Asia featuring John Payne.

After Wetton's departure, vocalist/bassist John Payne joined the band and, together with Downes, enlisted new musicians and led Asia through to 2006. The first album with this lineup was Aqua, released in June 1992. In addition to Downes and Payne, the album featured Howe, Palmer, and guitarist Al Pitrelli (of Danger Danger, Megadeth and Alice Cooper). Howe returned during the sessions having just left Yes again, but Palmer would leave soon, committing to an ELP reunion, and was able to play on just three songs. Drummers Simon Phillips and Nigel Glockler then completed the sessions. Downes' environmentalist single "Who Will Stop the Rain?" (originally written for Max Bacon and the aborted Rain project, later appearing on Bacon's album From the Banks of the River Irwell) attracted some radio attention. The Aqua club tour featured Howe (whose presence was heavily promoted), who took the stage after the fifth song. The tour was successful enough to warrant the band's continuation. The 1992–93 tour featured Downes, Howe, Payne, guitarist Vinny Burns and drummer Trevor Thornton. Before a European festival tour in late 1993, Howe and Burns left and were replaced by guitarist Keith More.

The group released Aria in May 1994, which featured lead guitarist Al Pitrelli once again, who would leave Asia during the short Aria tour. The Aria album did not fare well commercially and the ensuing tour was limited to four concerts. Ex-Simply Red guitarist Aziz Ibrahim took over during the tour. Aria also introduced new drummer Michael Sturgis, who had been involved during the band's aborted 1987 reunion and had appeared on some of the sessions for Aqua. Aria was not released in the United States until May 1995.

Over New Year's Eve 1995/1996, a broken pipe inundated the control room in Downes' and Payne's recording studio, Electric Palace, in London. Amid the lost equipment, a vault containing unreleased material was found intact. The band decided to release the material on two discs, Archiva 1 and Archiva 2. The Archiva sets were collections of unreleased tracks recorded during the first three Downes/Payne albums.

Next, Arena, released in February 1996, featured Downes, Payne, Sturgis, Ibrahim and guest guitarist Elliott Randall (ex-Steely Dan, and Randy Crawford). The album was released on Resurgence Records but there was no tour because of lack of interest. The group's lone promotional performance in conjunction with the album occurred on 19 April 1996, when Downes and Payne appeared with guitarist Elliott Randall on the Virgin FM radio programme Alive in London to play the song "Never".

An all-acoustic album, Live Acoustic, was recorded by the group at Stadthalle, Bruchsal, Germany on 21 September 1997 (and released in December 1999) that featured a lineup of Downes, Payne, Ibrahim, and drummer Bob Richards. Also in 1997, a best of album Anthology, featuring songs from the past six albums was released. However, a lawsuit from Wetton meant that songs from the first three albums needed to be re-recorded.

In 1999, there was talk of a reunion of the original lineup minus Howe. The original proposition included Dave Kilminster on guitar, who had previously toured and recorded with Wetton. While Howe was interested in participating, he was unable to because of his busy schedule with Yes. This reunion did not take place and John Payne continued to carry on Asia with Downes uninterrupted. Wetton and Palmer did, however, get together to form Qango, which included Kilminster and John Young, although the band was short-lived. Kilminster went on to work with Keith Emerson, The Nice and Roger Waters.

Also in 1999, Rare, Asia's seventh studio album, was released on Resurgence. It was made up of instrumental music which Downes and Payne had composed for the soundtrack for David Attenborough's documentary nature film Salmon: Against the Tides (tracks 1–16) and for an unreleased CD-ROM video game (tracks 17–22).

In 2000 Geffen/Universal released a best-of entitled The Very Best of Asia: Heat of the Moment (1982–1990), which also included three rare B-sides from the early days.

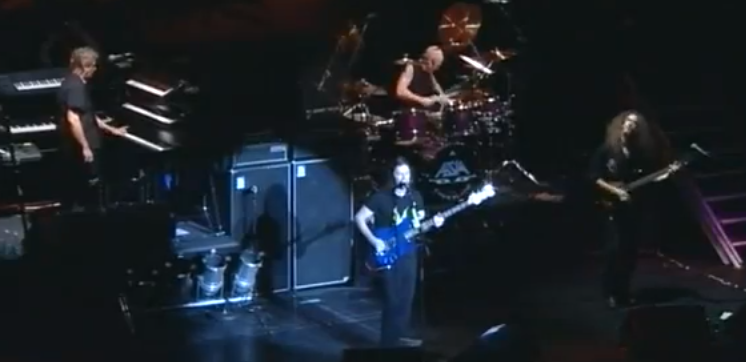
Asia in 2001; left-to-right: Downes, Payne, Chris Slade and Guthrie Govan

2001's Aura featured three different session guitarists, including Ian Crichton (of Canadian progressive rock band Saga) who had briefly joined Asia in 1998–1999. Aura took a more progressive rock form, but still did not recapture the commercial success of the first album. Former members Howe, Thrall, Sturgis and Elliott Randall also made guest appearances. The single "Ready to Go Home" was barely distributed. Asia then signed with Recognition Records. 2001 did see the band with a stable lineup, achieved during the Aura sessions featuring Downes, Payne, guitarist Guthrie Govan and ex-Manfred Mann's Earth Band/The Firm/Uriah Heep/Gary Numan/AC/DC drummer Chris Slade (who had first joined Asia in 1999, briefly).

In 2001 and 2002, Asia toured for the first time since 1994, including their first United States dates since 1993. A live album and DVD, both titled America: Live in the USA, were released in 2003, recorded at the Classic Rock Productions Classic Rock Festival at The Patriots Theater at the Trenton War Memorial in Trenton, New Jersey on 5 October 2002, which they co-headlined with Uriah Heep.

In the summer of 2003, Downes and Payne undertook the "Asia Across America Tour", which received some media attention. Performing "unplugged", the duo would reportedly play anywhere in the United States that fans requested, provided there was a venue and the fans put up $3,000 to cover costs.

Marking a departure from convention, for the first time a studio release was not titled as a single word starting and ending with the letter A (excepting the partial compilation / partial new album Then & Now). Released on Asia's newly signed label SPV/Inside Out Records, 2004's Silent Nation (the name being influenced by the Howard Stern vs. FCC incident) picked up some unexpected exposure on the Internet.

In 2004 an acoustic Asia toured once again featuring only Downes and Payne. In 2005 the full band toured in Europe and the Americas playing settings ranging from small clubs to medium-sized theatres. In the United States attendance was poor at best.

In August 2005 Slade left Asia to be replaced by drummer Jay Schellen. The new band started work on an album, tentatively entitled Architect of Time, which was originally planned for release early in 2006, though subsequent developments would cause this project to be shelved. Half of this material ended up being released on the album Window to the Soul in August 2006 under the new band name of GPS, which was an acronym for the three players involved: Govan, Payne and Schellen. After this, the three continued on as Asia Featuring John Payne in 2007.

Meanwhile, Wetton and Downes had released some archival Asia material under the name Wetton/Downes in September 2002 and they then reunited to record a full-length album (Icon, released in August 2005) and an accompanying EP and DVD. Two additional Icon projects have since followed: Icon II: Rubicon (November 2006) and Icon 3 (March 2009).

=== 2006–2013: "Original Asia" reunion ===
In early 2006, Downes left for a reunion of the original band lineup under the Asia name, a breakup that Payne described as "painful". The existing lineup (minus Downes) continued for a short while before morphing into the aforementioned GPS.

Following Downes' departure, on 9 May 2006, John Payne, Geoff Downes, John Wetton, Carl Palmer and Steve Howe contractually agreed that Payne could continue his 15-year period with Asia as Asia Featuring John Payne. Asia featuring John Payne debuted in 2007 with Payne on vocals/bass, Guthrie Govan on guitar, Erik Norlander on keyboards and Jay Schellen on drums. Downes, Wetton, Palmer and Howe continued to perform and record as Asia thereafter.

The official websites of each band reflect a split between the shared history of Payne's tenure with the band, as the reunited Asia acknowledge only pre- and post-Payne albums, whereas Asia Featuring John Payne claim Payne-era (1991–2006) albums Aqua (1992) through Silent Nation (2004) as part of their own discography. Asia Featuring John Payne perform songs from before and during Payne's time in Asia.

Downes and the other three original members (Wetton, Palmer and Howe) convened a group meeting in England in early 2006 in anticipation of formally reforming for work that year. And after a slew of rumours, they announced that this original lineup of Asia were planning a CD, DVD and world tour to celebrate the band's 25th anniversary. The band appeared in October 2006 on US cable channel VH-1 Classic and began a world tour largely focused on the United States. The band secured ownership of the Asia name and toured under the description of "The Four Original Members of Asia". The set list featured most of the first album as well as a couple of songs from the second, along with one selection each from Yes, ELP, King Crimson and the Buggles to acknowledge the history of each member of the band. In a 2006 interview, guitarist Steve Howe stated, "This is the real Asia. There have been other incarnations of the band, but this is the one that the public truly embraced".

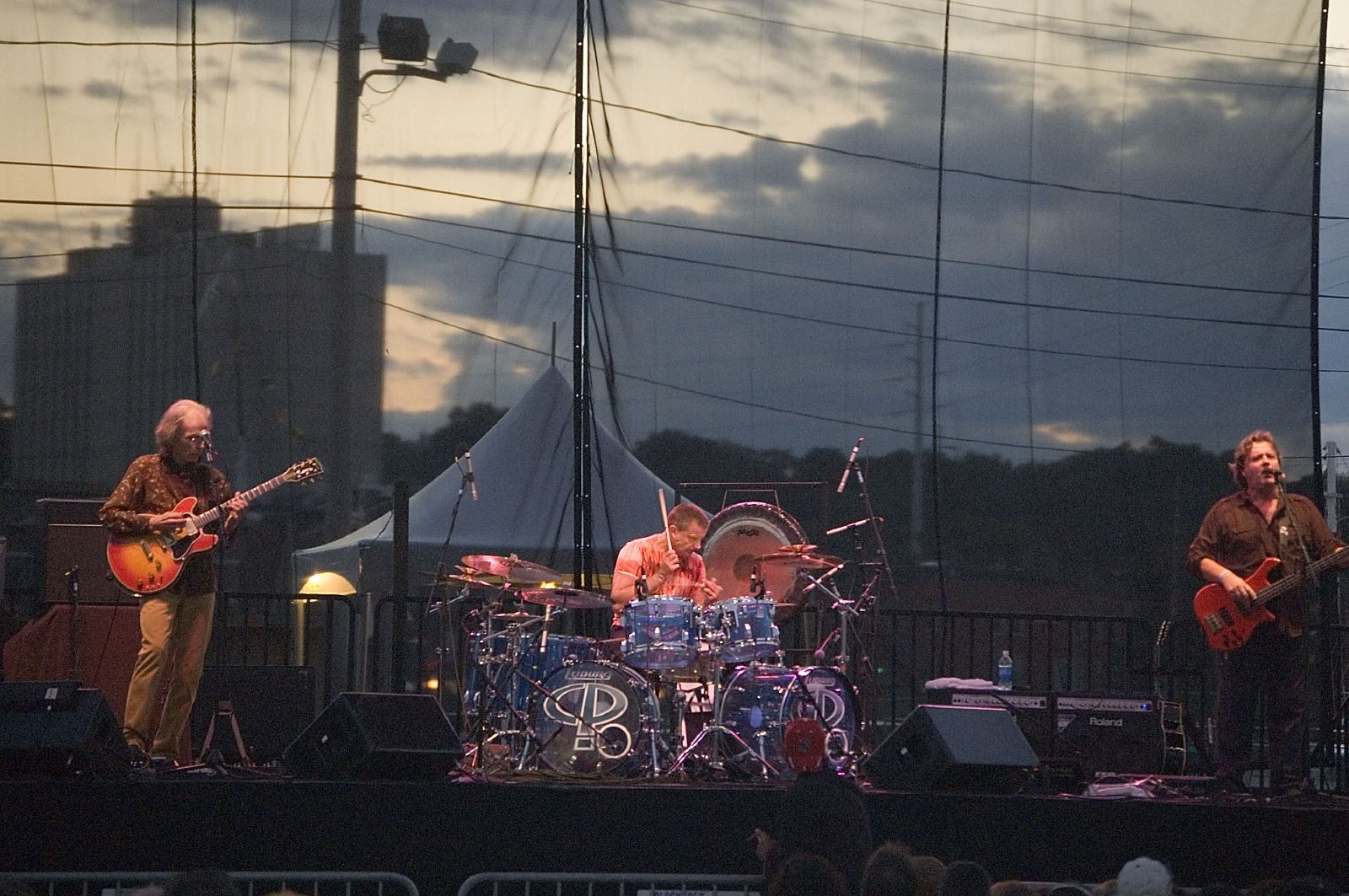
Asia in 2006; left-to-right: Howe, Palmer and Wetton (off-camera: Downes)

The tour began on 29 August 2006 in Rochester, New York. The Definitive Collection was released by Geffen/Universal to tie into the tour in September and peaked at No. 183 on the United States album charts, the first time Asia had made the charts since 1990. A limited edition release available only at Best Buy stores also included a DVD of all the band's music videos.

The reunion tour continued into 2007 with venue size based on the success of the 2006 shows, where the band was mainly playing in clubs and theatres. Many of these sold out, including all seven dates in Japan. Also in 2007, the band released Fantasia: Live In Tokyo on CD and DVD through Eagle Records, commemorating the 25th anniversary and documenting the success of the 2006–2007 tour.

In mid-2007, all four original members (Wetton, Downes, Howe and Palmer) went into the studio to record a new album, marking the first recorded material from all four original members since 1983's Alpha. The band continued to tour until major heart surgery for Wetton in the second half of the year saw remaining tour dates rescheduled for 2008.

The new studio album, entitled Phoenix, was released on Frontiers Records on 14 April 2008 (via EMI/Capitol on 15 April in North America), along with a world tour to promote. The 12-track album includes "An Extraordinary Life", based on Wetton's experience of ill health; rockers such as "Never Again" and "Alibis"; and power ballads such as "Heroine" and "I Will Remember You". The world tour also featured a couple of the new songs. The album cover featured Roger Dean's illustration and design. The Phoenix album did well in both the American and European/Japanese markets. It debuted at No. 73 on the American Billboard 200; the band had not charted with a studio album since 1985.

As a special finale to the US Phoenix tour, the band performed, for the first time ever, the entire first Asia album from beginning to end at their San Francisco concert at The Regency Center on 5 May. The album comprised the entire second set of the evening's concert.

In summer 2009, Asia toured the United States with Yes. Asia opened with a 55-minute show, while Yes closed with a 1-hour and 50-minute set. Asia's set included only "An Extraordinary Life" from Phoenix, the rest of the songs coming from the first two albums plus one cover each from The Buggles ("Video Killed the Radio Star" with Wetton on lead vocals and Downes on vocoder), King Crimson ("The Court of the Crimson King", which was recorded by the original incarnation of that band with Greg Lake on lead vocals) and Emerson, Lake & Palmer ("Fanfare for the Common Man"). Yes songs were omitted from this tour's setlist, though Asia also covered "Roundabout" on earlier legs of the "Four Original Members" tour. Contrary to some early expectations, Downes did not perform with Yes, although their set list included two songs from the 1980 album Drama, which featured Downes on keys. A series of shows late in the tour featured a special appearance by Ian McDonald (flute and vocals on "The Court Of The Crimson King", which he co-wrote, and backing vocals on "Heat Of The Moment").

In late 2009, the band began working on their follow-up CD to Phoenix. According to Wetton's website in late November 2009: "Good news is that the new album is starting to leap, rather than creep (or sleep) in terms of progress. This week I have two completed lead vocals, with complete harmony/chorus voxes on three. It's just me, Geoff [Downes], Steve R[ispin], and Mike Paxman in the studio--- Carl [Palmer] is pretty much all done, Steve H[owe] is half done, and returns to the fold after Yes tour. It sounds absolutely wonderful". The follow-up, titled Omega, was released in the UK on 26 April 2010.

The band finished a new studio album timed to coincide with the band's thirtieth anniversary, titled XXX, and released in the UK on 2 July 2012 and worldwide around the same time. In September 2012 they played four shows in Japan and a North American tour started on 11 October 2012. The UK tour, however, had to be cancelled after a number of shows due to Palmer contracting a serious case of E. coli.

=== 2013–2017: Howe's retirement, Gravitas and hiatus ===
On 10 January 2013, Steve Howe announced his retirement from the band to focus on other projects, including Yes, bringing an end to the reunion of the original lineup. Asia in turn announced they would be continuing with new guitarist Sam Coulson, with a new album in the works entitled Gravitas. The new lineup performed live in 2013.

On the website ultimateclassicrock.com, Howe explained his decision to leave Asia:

Something had to give. Because I'd just done five years with both bands and then Geoff had joined [Yes] when we did Fly From Here, which is maybe a lot shorter, only a quarter of that time for him. He only experienced the tip of the iceberg of being on call for two bands. But there were times in the first three years — it actually got easier when Geoff joined. It was easier because we were both in the band and we could both wrestle with the schedules — but before that, at times, Yes or Asia would extend a tour by a day and then Yes or Asia would then expand the start of the tour, so the gap would start to close.

And I would start freaking out saying "yeah, but hang on ... if you add that date here and they've just added this date here, I'm now squeezed like a concertina." So there was going to be a time at some point when this was unworkable and unfortunately it was the end of last year that made me realize that this being on call was really too much. I couldn't keep either really happy. I was either making Yes miserable or Asia miserable, because of the other one being in existence.

So I think that Asia had a terrific run and we made three great albums. In fact, XXX, I think, is a fantastic record.

— Steve Howe

The band finished the recording sessions for Gravitas in December 2013 and in January 2014 they started shooting the music video for "Valkyrie", which was released as a single. The album's cover artwork was designed by Asia longtime collaborator Roger Dean. On 30 January 2014, Wetton revealed the album's track listing through Asia's official website and talked about each song from the album. The album was released on 24 March 2014 and reached Number 1 in the Progressive Rock Chart for emusic on 27 March.

Following Gravitas and the subsequent tour, the band went on an almost three-year hiatus due to Wetton having cancer and undergoing chemotherapy. On 5 December 2016, Asia announced a US tour opening for American rock band Journey, beginning with twelve dates from 15 March 2017 at the Yakima Valley Sundome in Yakima, Washington, and four days later, announced their live album Symfonia: Live in Bulgaria 2013, which they performed with the Plovdiv Philharmonic Orchestra.

=== 2017–2018: Wetton's death and tour with Journey ===
On 11 January 2017, Wetton released a statement that, due to receiving another round of chemotherapy, he would be unable to perform on the dates announced for the Journey tour, and that he would be substituted by Billy Sherwood, one of Downes' Yes bandmates, and Wetton's own co-writer and producer of the album Raised in Captivity. The band originally wanted to cancel the tour altogether, but Journey's management and agents refused, forcing them to pick Sherwood as a last-minute replacement.

Wetton died on 31 January 2017 at the age of 67; Palmer later stated "So, we used Billy and we had a phenomenal time. It was a great experience all 'round, and I'm pleased we did it. John would have loved to be on that tour, so I'm pleased we did it for him, anyway." On 17 June 2017 Asia performed a show in homage to Wetton, titled An Extraordinary Life. The show was an interactive celebration of Wetton's music and life. Fan dedications were sent into management and shown on a large projection screen above the stage.

After Wetton's death, Downes stated that the duo had been working on another Asia album and stated that he hopes to eventually finish and release it as a final testament to Wetton. It is unclear whether Wetton had recorded any parts, or if the album had only been in the songwriting process. In August 2017, Palmer stated that there were no immediate plans for Asia to continue, as it was too soon to make any decisions and the band members would be busy on other projects in the meantime.

=== 2019–2023: Lineup changes, tour with Yes, and 40th Anniversary Tour ===
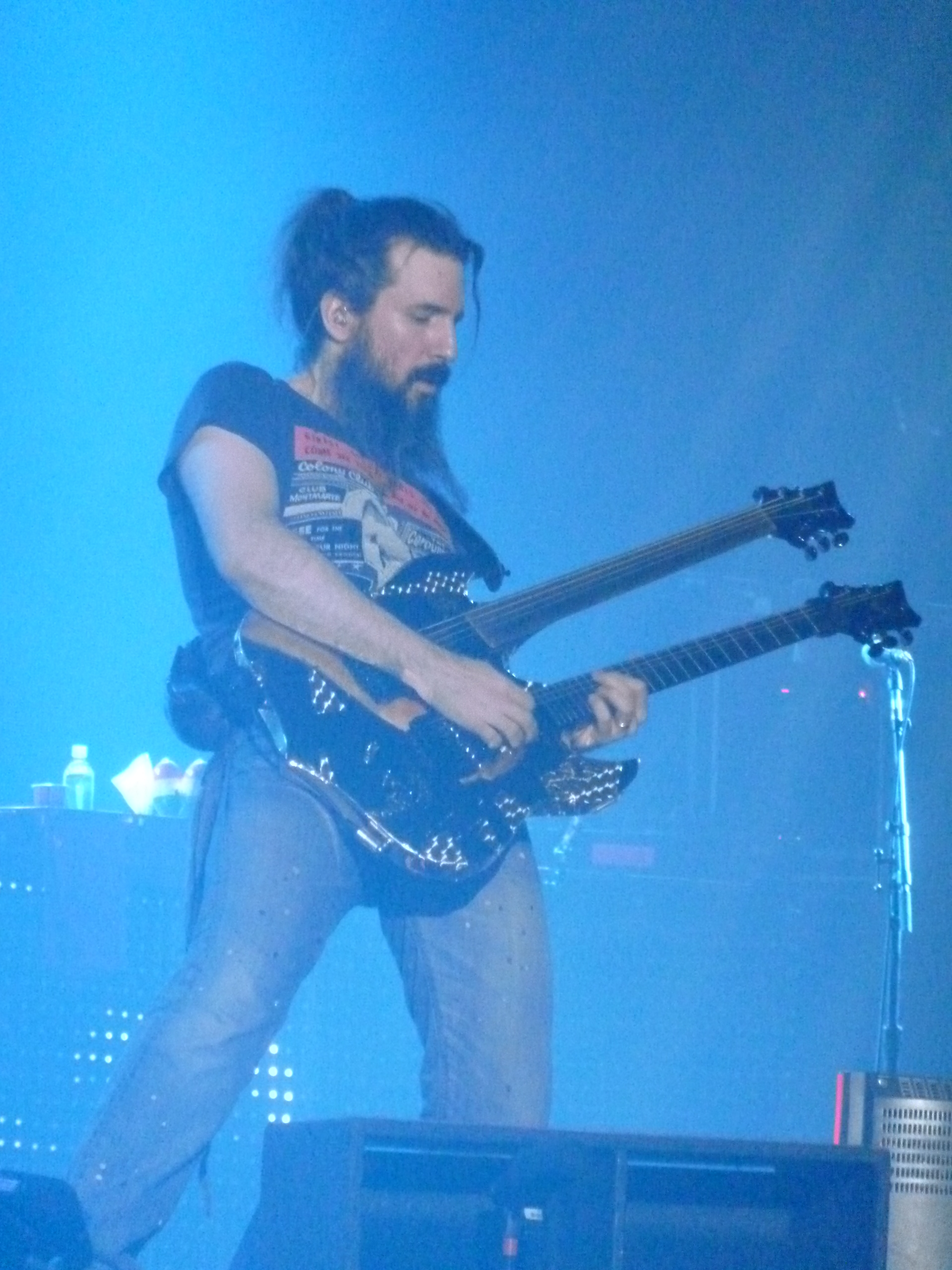
Guitarist and vocalist Ron "Bumblefoot" Thal joined the band in 2019.

On 2 April 2019, the band announced it would join Yes, John Lodge, and Carl Palmer's ELP Legacy as part of The Royal Affair Tour, a 26-date Summer 2019 North American joint tour, with Steve Howe joining the band for a portion of the set. The band also confirmed that Sam Coulson had amicably left Asia to focus on solo projects and that he would be replaced as guitarist on the tour by Ron "Bumblefoot" Thal, who also took over lead vocals, with Sherwood remaining on bass but moving to backing vocals. Coulson confirmed his departure on Twitter the same day.

In 2019, a New York Times investigation revealed that Asia was among hundreds of artists whose material was destroyed in the 2008 Universal fire. While Universal Music has generally disputed the severity of the fire's damage, they have yet to publicly confirm or deny the status of Asia's masters, while Downes has stated that he has it "on good authority" that the masters survived.

In 2022, Asia announced a 40th Anniversary Tour, with Marc Bonilla on guitar and vocals. However, the tour was later cancelled due to Alan Parsons, the band's opening act, backing out in order to undergo surgery. Following the cancellation, Palmer said in February 2023 that there were no plans for any activity for the rest of the year.

=== 2024–present: New lineup and album ===
In August 2023, a memorial concert to John Wetton was held in the UK. For this show, Downes assembled a line-up to perform some Asia songs with Billy Sherwood (bass) and Jay Schellen (drums), with whom he was working in Yes, plus John Mitchell (guitar) and Harry Whitley (vocals). Mitchell had often worked with Wetton, while Downes had connected with Whitley online after seeing Whitley covering Asia songs on YouTube.

This led to a new Asia line-up of Downes (keys), Mitchell (guitar), Whitley (bass, vocals) and Virgil Donati (drums). The band toured the US in summer 2024, together with Focus, Martin Turner (ex-Wishbone Ash), and Curved Air. Palmer revealed that he would not be on the tour, though he hoped to "eventually embrace the music of ASIA again at some point in the future." Touring continued into 2025-6.

In June 2025, the band announced that they had been signed by Frontiers Music to release several albums, including a new studio album in 2026. Live album Live in England was released March 2026. The studio album Indigo was released 6 November 2026: it includes material Downes and Wetton wrote together in their final writing sessions, and has guest appearances by Howe and Mike Portnoy.

== Personnel ==
Throughout the years, Geoff Downes has been the longest serving member of the band and is the only one to appear on every studio album. However, he was out of the band from its 1989 reunion to 1990 due to prior commitments at the time.

The original lineup initially lasted from 1981 until 1983 when John Wetton left. It was reunited on two occasions: first, one year later when Wetton rejoined, but Steve Howe left before the band could work together again, and a second time in 2006, when Downes, the last original member in the band at the time, replaced his then-current lineup with his original bandmates. This last original reunion lasted until 2013, when Howe left once again. Wetton died from cancer in 2017.

Several musicians have joined and left after a short time without recording any studio material with the group. The most notable collaboration of this kind was the participation of Greg Lake in the "Asia in Asia" concert on bass guitar and lead vocals. Yet more musicians have played as session musicians or have guested with the band without formally joining. Some of these artists include: Robert Fleischman, Vinnie Colaiuta, Francis Dunnery, Ant Glynne, Scott Gorham, Tomoyasu Hotei, Luís Jardim, Ron Komie, Tony Levin, Steve Lukather, Thomas Lang, Kim Nielsen-Parsons, Nigel Glockler, Simon Phillips, and Alex Thomas.

=== Lineup ===
Current members

- Geoff Downes – keyboards, backing vocals (1981–1986, 1990–present)
- Harry Whitley – lead vocals, bass (2024–present)
- John Mitchell – guitar, backing vocals (2024–present)
- Virgil Donati – drums (2024–present)

== Discography ==
Studio albums

- Asia (1982)
- Alpha (1983)
- Astra (1985)
- Aqua (1992)
- Aria (1994)
- Arena (1996)
- Rare (1999)
- Aura (2001)
- Silent Nation (2004)
- Phoenix (2008)
- Omega (2010)
- XXX (2012)
- Gravitas (2014)
- Indigo (2026)

== Soundtracks and other uses ==
- In the episode "Kenny Dies" of the animated TV series South Park, Eric Cartman and the United States Congress sing "Heat of the Moment" a cappella.
- In the film The 40-Year-Old Virgin, main character Andy Stitzer is mocked for having a framed Asia poster in his apartment. Also, "Heat of the Moment" is played during the scene in which Andy chases Trish's car after she leaves his home.
- In the episode "The Splendid Source" of the animated TV series Family Guy, John Payne is introduced simply as "Lead Singer of Asia." Payne gleefully takes advantage of the fact that the ex-wife of REO Speedwagon's lead singer Kevin Cronin will get money if the song "Time for Me to Fly" plays. The song "Only Time Will Tell" plays.
- The song "Lay Down Your Arms" was used by the animated film Freddie the Frog (1992) starring Ben Kingsley, Jenny Agutter and Brian Blessed.
- In the film Over the Top with Sylvester Stallone, a song called "Gypsy Soul" is credited to Asia, although John Wetton was the only member involved as the song was written and recorded by Giorgio Moroder.
- In 2010, their song “An Extraordinary Life” was used in a promo for season five of “America’s Got Talent.”

== See also ==
- Rodney Matthews, a fantasy artist responsible for some of the album covers during the 1990s.
