= Go (Asia song) =

Single by Asia

from the album Astra
- B-side: "After the War"
- Released: November 1985
- Length: 4:09 (album version); 3:40 (7" single edit)
- Label: Geffen
- Songwriters: John Wetton; Geoff Downes
- Producers: Mike Stone; Downes

Asia singles chronology
"The Smile Has Left Your Eyes" (1983)	"Go" (1985)	"Days Like These" (1990)

Music video
- "Go" on YouTube

"Go" is a song by English rock supergroup Asia, released as the lead single from their third studio album Astra. A 7-inch single with "After the War" as the B-side was issued in the United States and the United Kingdom in November 1985 by Geffen Records. Additionally, remix and instrumental versions made by keyboard player Geoff Downes were issued as a 12-inch single in the United Kingdom.

Like most of the songs from the album, "Go" was written by vocalist/bassist John Wetton and Downes. It features Mandy Meyer's prominent guitar work.

An official music video was produced and, despite it being a big MTV hit, the single only attained a peak of number 46 on the Billboard Hot 100.

Cash Box praised the "airtight arrangement and musicianship" but said that it is "hard driving yet unadventurous." Billboard called it a "massive and mighty record."

== Track listing ==
All tracks are written by John Wetton and Geoff Downes.

U.S. 7" single (Geffen 9 28872-7)
No.	Title	Length
1.	"Go"	3:40
2.	"After the War"	5:09
Total length:		8:49

U.S. promo 7" single (Geffen 9 28872-7)
No.	Title	Length
1.	"Go" (edit)	3:40
2.	"Go" (edit)	3:40
Total length:		7:20

UK 12" single (Geffen TA 6737)
No.	Title	Length
1.	"Go" (remix)	8:04
2.	"Go" (instrumental)	8:11
3.	"After the War"	5:06
Total length:		21:21

U.S. promo 12" single (Geffen PRO-A-2375)
No.	Title	Length
1.	"Go"	4:06
2.	"Go"	4:06
Total length:		8:12

== Personnel ==
=== Asia ===
- John Wetton – vocals, bass guitars
- Geoff Downes – keyboards; producer
- Mandy Meyer – guitar
- Carl Palmer – drums

=== Technical personnel ===
- Mike Stone – producer, engineer, mixing engineer
- Greg Ladanyi – mixing engineer
- Alan Douglas – engineer, mixing engineer
- John David Kalodner – executive producer
- Roger Dean – cover design

== Charts ==
Chart (1985–1986)	Peak position
Canada Top Singles (RPM)	77
US Billboard Hot 100	46
US Mainstream Rock Airplay (Billboard)	7
