= Astra (album) =

Studio album by Asia
- Released: 11 November 1985
- Recorded: 1984–1985
- Studios: Westside, London; The Townhouse, London; Sarm West, London
- Genres: Progressive pop; synth rock; hard rock
- Length: 45:06
- Label: Geffen
- Producers: Mike Stone; Geoff Downes

Asia chronology
Alpha (1983)	Astra (1985)	Aurora (1986)

Singles from Astra
- 1. "Go" Released: November 1985; 2. "Wishing" Released: March 1986 (US)

Professional ratings
Review scores
Source	Rating
AllMusic	3/5 stars
Sounds	1/5 stars

Astra is the third studio album by the English rock supergroup Asia, released on 11 November 1985 in the US and on 25 November in the UK by Geffen Records. It was their last full-length studio album with co-founding vocalist and bassist John Wetton until Phoenix (2008), released after the original line-up reunited in 2006. Astra is the first of two albums from Asia—the other being Then & Now—with Swiss guitarist Mandy Meyer, who replaced Steve Howe.

== Background ==
Begun in 1984, Astra marked the return of Wetton to the group after his firing in September 1983. He had been replaced by Emerson, Lake & Palmer co-founder Greg Lake, temporarily, for the concerts at the Nippon Budokan in Tokyo in December 1983. The opening night of these shows, highly advertised as Asia in Asia, was the first in the history of MTV to be broadcast via satellite transmission. Following a two-month stint, Lake had left Asia and soon Wetton had been convinced to come back. The latter agreed, but made it a condition to his return that Howe depart the line-up. By the time sessions for Astra began, the group had recruited Meyer, a former guitarist of the Swiss hard rock band Krokus. This personnel change marked a shift in musical direction for Asia to a more edgy, slightly arena rock and metal sound. Howe commented in The Steve Howe Guitar Collection (1993) that when the album was done he was asked to play on it but declined because he didn't feel the material was strong.

== Production ==
Continuing the trend from Alpha (1983), the main composers on Astra were Wetton and keyboard player Geoff Downes. Two songs, "Voice of America" and "Wishing", were started by Wetton during his time away from the group, initially for a solo album. Downes eventually joined Wetton in writing "Voice of America", with the song intended as a tribute to Brian Wilson of The Beach Boys. "Hard on Me" was written solely by Wetton at the end of the sessions, when the label complained about the lack of a potential hit single. One of the out-take tracks, "We Move as One", was recorded by former ABBA vocalist Agnetha Fältskog on her solo album Eyes of a Woman (1985).

Astra was recorded at Westside Studios, The Townhouse Studios and Sarm West Studios, all of which are located in London. Like the two previous recordings, it was produced by Mike Stone, but this time with the participation of Downes. The album was originally intended to be titled Arcadia, but this was changed prior to the release to avoid confusion, when it was learned that a side project of the same name of Duran Duran was being recorded at the same time. The cover artwork was designed by Roger Dean, who had collaborated with Asia since their debut.

== Reception ==
Astra has received mixed reception from music critics. Sandy Robertson in his review for Sounds gave the album a rating of just one star out of five. However, Matt Collar has given the album a retrospective rating of three stars out of five on AllMusic. He has called Astra "a solid prog rock outing" and "a truly underrated '80s rock album and a must-hear for fans".

According to Downes, Geffen did not promote Astra as much as they could have, partly, because they were switching their distribution in Europe. Without the support from the label along with general lack of public interest, the album performed poorly commercially in comparison with Asia's two preceding albums. It reached number 67 on the Billboard 200 and spent 17 weeks on the charts. In the group's native United Kingdom, the album performed even worse, peaking at number 68 and staying just one week on the charts. The lead-off single, "Go", reached number 46 on the Billboard Hot 100 and climbed to number 7 on the Mainstream Rock chart. "Too Late" was released as a promotion only 12" single in the United States and was a minor radio hit, peaking at number 30. The lackluster reception of Astra led to Geffen cancelling a supporting tour, and by 1986 Asia had dissolved despite the group not making any official statement.

== Track listing ==
All tracks are written by John Wetton and Geoff Downes, except "Hard on Me" and "Too Late" written by Wetton, Downes and Carl Palmer.

Side one
No.	Title	Length
1.	"Go"	4:09
2.	"Voice of America"	4:29
3.	"Hard on Me"	3:37
4.	"Wishing"	4:17
5.	"Rock and Roll Dream"	6:53

Side two
No.	Title	Length
6.	"Countdown to Zero"	4:17
7.	"Love Now Till Eternity"	4:14
8.	"Too Late"	4:14
9.	"Suspicion"	3:47
10.	"After the War"	5:09
Total length:		45:06

== Personnel ==
=== Asia ===
- Geoff Downes – keyboards, producer
- John Wetton – vocals, bass guitars
- Mandy Meyer – guitar
- Carl Palmer – drums

=== Additional musicians ===
- The Royal Philharmonic Orchestra – orchestra (on "Rock and Roll Dream") (orchestrated, arranged and conducted by Louis Clark)

=== Technical personnel ===
- Mike Stone – producer, engineer, mixing engineer
- Greg Ladanyi – mixing engineer
- Alan Douglas – engineer, mixing engineer
- John David Kalodner – executive producer
- Greg Fulginiti – mastering engineer
- Bob Ludwig – mastering engineer
- Roger Dean – cover design
- Willie Christie – cover photography

== Charts ==
Chart (1985–86)	Peak position
Australian Albums (Kent Music Report)	99
Canada Top Albums/CDs (RPM)	66
Finnish Albums (The Official Finnish Charts)	39
German Albums (Offizielle Top 100)	48
Japanese Albums (Oricon)	15
Norwegian Albums (VG-lista)	18
Swedish Albums (Sverigetopplistan)	17
Swiss Albums (Schweizer Hitparade)	10
UK Albums (Official Charts)	68
US Billboard 200	67
