= Dukes of the Orient =

Rock band

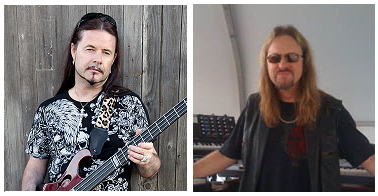
- John Payne (left) and Erik Norlander, pictured in 2011 and 2008 respectively

Background information
- Origin: Los Angeles
- Genres: Progressive rock, AOR
- Years active: 2017–present
- Labels: Frontiers; Nexus; Seven Seas
- Spinoff of: Asia featuring John Payne
- Members: John Payne; Erik Norlander
- Website: dukesoftheorient.com

Dukes of the Orient are an English and American AOR and progressive rock band formed in 2017 by lead vocalist, guitarist and bassist John Payne and keyboardist Erik Norlander. Payne and Norlander had previously worked together in Asia Featuring John Payne, an offshoot of British progressive rock group Asia of which Payne was a member from 1991 to 2006, when Asia's original lineup reunited. Following Asia lead singer John Wetton's death on 31 January 2017, Payne and Norlander formed Dukes of the Orient as a vehicle to release new material, both out of respect for Wetton, and to distinguish themselves from Payne's former band. Asia Featuring John Payne remains active in a touring capacity, and members and former members of the group; Jay Schellen, Bruce Bouillet, Guthrie Govan, Jeff Kollman and Moni Scaria, have contributed to Dukes of the Orient's debut album.

== History ==
=== Origins ===
Payne has played with various rock and progressive rock outfits since the late 70s, including touring the UK with the Jimi Hendrix-inspired Moonstone and CCCP, as well as working with Roger Daltrey, and ELO Part II.

In 1991, Payne joined British progressive rock group Asia, to replace their original lead singer and bassist John Wetton. Meanwhile in the 90s, Norlander was performing with his band Rocket Scientists, as well as working on collaborations with his wife Lana Lane. Payne remained as Asia's frontman until 2006, when Asia's original lineup reunited, including Wetton returning to replace Payne, a split that Payne has described as "painful". Following this, Payne formed GPS with fellow expelled Asia members Guthrie Govan (guitars) and Jay Schellen (drums), with Ryo Okumoto of Spock's Beard on keyboards. In 2007, Payne, along with Govan and Schellen also formed Asia Featuring John Payne, a continuation of Asia prior to the reunion minus original Asia keyboardist Geoff Downes. Norlander was brought in as the group's keyboardist.

=== 2007-2017: Asia Featuring John Payne, work towards new album ===
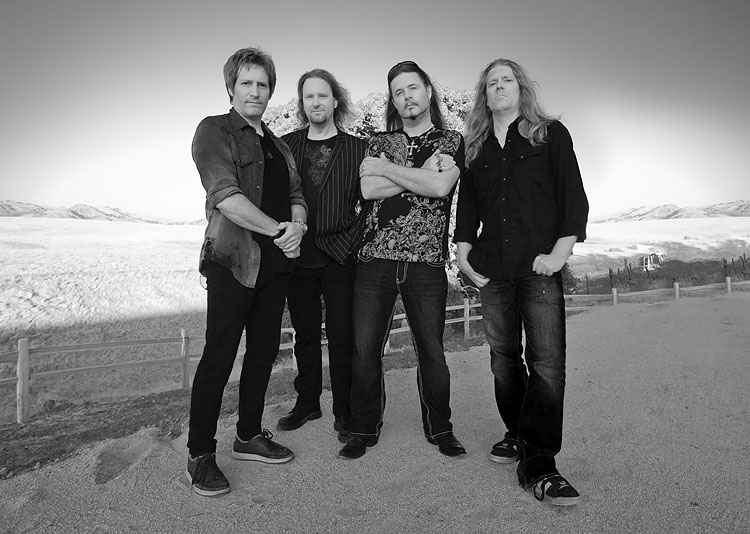
Asia Featuring John Payne c.2012; left-to-right: Jay Schellen, Norlander, Payne, and Bruce Bouillet

Asia Featuring John Payne went on numerous US tours with songs from the Asia catalogue, as well as working on new material in the studio. Having received a record deal from Sony Music Entertainment, the band embarked on recording a new album under the name Architects of Time (a name that was eventually given to a Payne solo project) and later Americana In 2009 they released an EP entitled "Military Man", featuring re-recorded "2009 versions" of Asia songs from Payne's time in the band. In 2012, after several lineup changes, the band also released a new music video for a song entitled "Seasons Will Change", intended for the new album. Norlander stated in a 2016 interview with music website Ready To Rock that he had stopped working with the band in 2013.

=== 2017-19: Formation, release of first album ===
On 14 December 2017, Payne's official Facebook page announced the release of a "Payne/Norlander album" entitled Dukes of the Orient on Frontier Records, to be released on 28 February 2018. On 24 February, another Facebook post on Payne's Facebook page announced that Dukes of the Orient was indeed "a new band". The previously released Asia Featuring John Payne single "Seasons Will Change" appeared on the self-titled album, with the band's website stating that new Asia Featuring John Payne material will be released under Dukes of the Orient, out of respect for Asia frontman John Wetton (who had died on 31 January 2017), and to distinguish themselves from the original Asia. The album was released on 28 February as stated, and featured contributions former and current members of Asia Featuring John Payne; Jay Schellen, Bruce Bouillet, Guthrie Govan, Jeff Kollman and Moni Scaria.

=== 2019-present: Second album ===
On 20 June 2019, Payne shared on the group's Facebook page. The post features a video of Payne in a recording studio, and claims that he is working on "Dukes 2".

On 1 June 2020, a music video for "The Monitors" was released, along with the announcement that a new Dukes of the Orient album, titled Freakshow, would be released on Frontiers on 7 August. An audio clip for the album track "The Dukes Return" followed on 6 July.

== Personnel ==
=== Current members ===
- John Payne – lead vocals, guitars, bass (2017–present)
- Erik Norlander – keyboards, backing vocals (2017–present)

== Discography ==
=== Albums ===
- Dukes of the Orient (2018, Nexus, Seven Seas, Frontiers Records)
- Freakshow (2020, Frontiers Records)
