= Archiva 2 =

Compilation album by Asia
- Released: 26 August 1996
- Recorded: 1988–1996
- Genres: Progressive rock; album-oriented rock
- Length: 51:53
- Label: Resurgence
- Producers: Geoff Downes; John Payne

Asia chronology
Archiva 1 (1996)	Archiva 2 (1996)	Anthology (1997)

Professional ratings
Review scores
Source	Rating
AllMusic	3/5 stars

Archiva is a two-volume collection of out-takes and previously unreleased tracks by English rock supergroup Asia. The second volume, designated as Archiva 2, was released on 26 August 1996 by Resurgence.

== Background ==
In late 1995, Asia had completed work on their sixth studio album, Arena. On 1 January 1996, when the group returned from the holidays to their recording studio, Electric Palace, in London, they found that a water pipe had burst and had destroyed hundreds of thousands of pounds' worth of equipment. Despite the accident, a box of old tapes with a large number of archived tracks survived. These tracks, which had failed to make the previous three albums, were quickly considered for a release.

== Production ==
Archiva 2 was compiled from leftover tracks, which were recorded at various locations from 1988 to 1995. The album was mixed at Loco Studios in Monmouthshire, Wales, in 1996 by keyboard player Geoff Downes and vocalist/bassist John Payne. Chris Thorpe was responsible for the mastering. The cover artwork was designed by Rodney Matthews, who had also created the covers for Aqua and Arena, and features the Asia logotype designed by Roger Dean.

== Composition ==
=== "Obsession" ===
"Obsession" was composed by Payne and Steve Rodford in November 1991 and was recorded at Advision Studios in Brighton, England, for inclusion on Aqua. However, it was left out from the album due to an abundance of tracks.

=== "Moon Under the Water" ===
"Moon Under the Water" was written by Downes and Johnny Warman in March 1988 and was one of the tracks recorded by the duo in the basement of Advision Studios in London from 1988 to 1989. It was first released on Downes' album Vox Humana (1992) with Steve Overland on lead vocals.

=== "Love Like the Video" ===
"Love Like the Video" was written by Payne and Andy Nye in March 1987 and was recorded at Nye's home studio.

=== "Don't Come to Me" ===
"Don't Come to Me" is Canadian musician Eddie Schwartz's song from his album Public Life (1984). It was covered by Asia in May 1995 for inclusion on Arena, but was left over.

=== "The Smoke That Thunders" ===
Co-written by Carl Palmer, "The Smoke That Thunders" was the first track recorded in March 1995 at Electric Palace Studios in London for Arena. Because of Palmer's tight schedule, he was not able to play on it, so the drums were sampled from Aqua and overdubbed in his style.

=== "Satellite Blues" ===
"Satellite Blues" was composed by Downes and Warman in September 1988 and was recorded at Advision Studios in London. Like "Moon Under the Water", it was first released on Downes' album Vox Humana with Warman on lead vocals. A version with Payne on lead vocals was done near the end of 1988.

=== "Showdown" ===
"Showdown" is a hit song, which was composed by Jeff Lynne and appeared on the U.S. edition of Electric Light Orchestra album On the Third Day (1973). It was covered by Asia in June 1995 for Arena, but was dropped.

=== "That Season" ===
"That Season" is another Arena out-take. It was written by Downes and Payne in June 1995 and was recorded at Electric Palace Studios. The song was left out from the album at the last minute due to the time factor.

=== "Can't Tell These Walls" ===
"Can't Tell These Walls" was written by Payne and Nye and was recorded at Nye's home studio.

=== "The Higher You Climb" ===
"The Higher You Climb" was composed by Downes, Warman and Ben Woolfenden in July 1988 and was recorded at Advision Studios in London. It had originally Max Bacon on lead vocals.

=== "Right to Cry" ===
"Right to Cry" is another Arena out-take. It was written by Downes and Payne in May 1995 and was recorded at Electric Palace Studios. The song was shelved because the group felt it was very similar in style to several other tracks.

=== "Armenia" ===
"Armenia" was spawned as an extra track for The Earthquake Album (1990) but was never used. It was written by Downes and Payne in January 1990 and was recorded at Loco Studios in Monmouthshire, Wales, in 1996.

== 2005 Inside Out Music remastered edition ==
As a part of series of remastered and expanded editions, Inside Out Music re-released Archiva as a combined two-disc set, featuring bonus tracks. The digital remastering was completed by Peter van 't Riet. The volume two was expanded by the single edit of "Little Rich Boy" and an ethnic mix of "Turn It Around".

== Track listing ==
No.	Title	Writer(s)	Written	Length
1.	"Obsession"	John Payne, Steve Rodford	November 1991	4:57
2.	"Moon Under the Water"	Geoff Downes, Johnny Warman	March 1988	4:02
3.	"Love Like the Video"	Payne, Andy Nye	March 1987	3:53
4.	"Don't Come to Me"	Eddie Schwartz	May 1995	4:53
5.	"The Smoke That Thunders"	Downes, Payne, Carl Palmer	March 1995	3:28
6.	"Satellite Blues"	Downes, Warman	September 1988	4:47
7.	"Showdown"	Jeff Lynne	1973	4:47
8.	"That Season"	Downes, Payne	June 1995	4:52
9.	"Can't Tell These Walls"	Payne, Nye	June 1994	4:05
10.	"The Higher You Climb"	Downes, Warman, Ben Woolfenden	July 1988	3:25
11.	"Right to Cry"	Downes, Payne	May 1995	3:35
12.	"Armenia"	Downes, Payne	January 1990	5:02
Total length:				51:53

2005 Inside Out Music remastered edition bonus tracks
No.	Title	Writer(s)	Length
13.	"Little Rich Boy" (edit)	Downes, Payne	3:41
14.	"Turn It Around" (ethnic mix)	Downes, Payne, Michael Sturgis	4:16
Total length:			59:37

== Personnel ==
Asia :

- Geoff Downes – keyboards, drum programming (tracks 2, 4, 7, 8, 11, 12); producer, mixing engineer
- John Payne – lead vocals, backing vocals, bass, guitar (tracks 3–9); producer, mixing engineer

Guest musicians :

- Anthony Glynne – guitar (track 1)
- Al Pitrelli – guitar (track 1)
- Adrian Dessent – guitar (track 6)
- Elliott Randall – guitar (track 8)
- Scott Gorham – guitar (track 10)
- Nigel Glockler – drums (track 1)
- Trevor Thornton – drums (track 2)
- Carl Palmer – drums (track 5)
- Preston Hayman – drums (track 6)
- Michael Sturgis – drums (track 10)
- Andy Nye – keyboards and drum programming (tracks 3, 9)
- Luis Jardim – percussion (track 8)

=== Technical personnel ===
- Chris Thorpe – mastering engineer
- Peter van 't Riet – 2005 digital remastering
- Rodney Matthews – cover illustration
- Roger Dean – Asia logotype
