= Don Schiff =

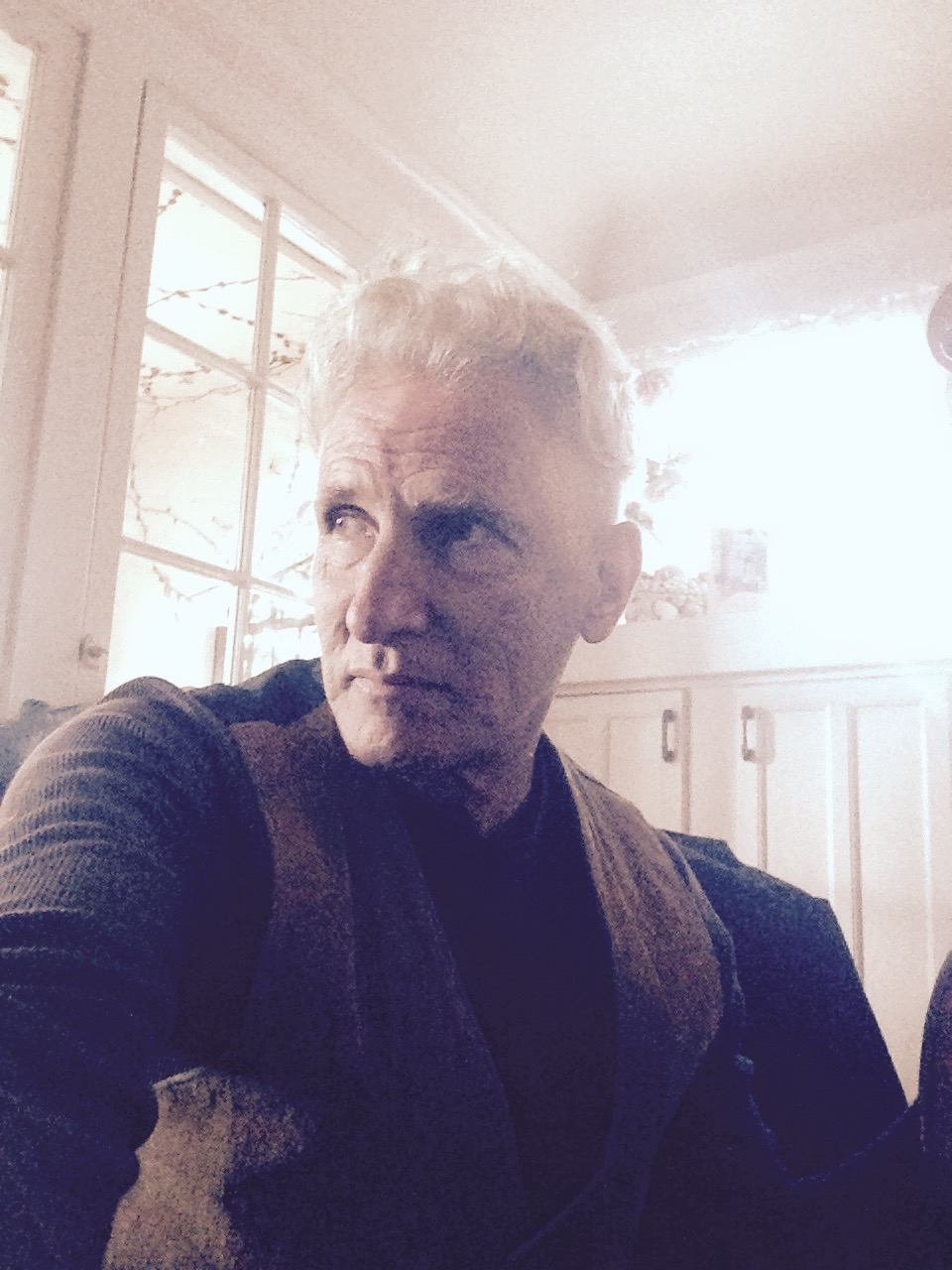

Background information
- Born: November 9, 1955 (age 70); Wilmington, Delaware
- Origin: Wilmington, Delaware
- Genres: Progressive rock, rock
- Occupations: Musician, songwriter
- Instruments: NS/Stick, Chapman Stick, bass guitar, bowed guitar
- Years active: 1974 - Present
- Label: Think Tank Media
- Website: www.donschiff.com

Don Schiff (born November 9, 1955) is a bass guitar, Chapman Stick, NS/Stick, and bowed guitar player on recordings, TV, and film sessions. He is one of the earliest Stick, NS/Stick, and bowed guitar players. He helped popularize the NS/Stick and a technique of using a carabiner as a slide and tapping device.

A native of Wilmington, Delaware, Schiff moved to Las Vegas, Nevada immediately after high school in 1974. At age 19 he quickly developed a reputation and within five months got his first break when hired to be the 'house bassist' for the Flamingo Las Vegas and Hilton Hotel Showrooms. There, he played for such artists as Elvis Presley, Tina Turner, Peggy Lee, Sammy Davis Jr., Ann-Margret, Perry Como, and The 5th Dimension, as well as others.

Schiff purchased his first Chapman Stick in 1975 and quickly adapted to it, creating his own style of playing. Gradually, around the time he was making the move to Los Angeles in 1977, he began using it during live dates and recording sessions for various artists including Eddie Money, Lana Lane, Dwight Yoakam, Erik Norlander and Sheryl Crow. He met screenwriter and director Patrick Sean Duncan who hired him to score the films Live From Death Row and Family Values. He can be seen briefly in both of those films since Pat Duncan cast him in films he directed, placing him in odd scenes.

In 2000, Emmett Chapman and Ned Steinberger developed the first prototype NS/Stick. Schiff was given one of the first two prototypes to try out. He developed many new techniques on it including "tapping while plucking" and "slide technique" using a carabiner while tapping.

The song "Cerebral Man", which he wrote along with Tully Winfield, was recorded by Pat Benatar on her album entitled Wide Awake in Dreamland for which he received a gold album in 1988. The song "With Every Word" recorded by Nia Peeples on her self-titled album was also written by Schiff and Winfield.

Schiff plays NS/Stick in the band Rocket Scientists. He also scores music for and wrote the theme for the web series "The Guild". As of 2023 Currently touring with the band Unitopia playing NS/Stick and will appear on their soon to be released 2023 European tour recorded live on Blue Ray.

He continues to help and inspire others toward their musical goals freely giving of his time and talents.

== Solo albums ==
- Timeless (1999)
- Wait By the River (2002)
- Peering Over Clouds (2005)

=== Rocket Scientists albums ===
- Earthbound (1993)
- Brutal Architecture (1995)
- Earth Below and Sky Above: Live in Europe and America (1998)
- Oblivion Days (1999)
- Revolution Road (2006)
- Looking Backward (2007)
- "Supernatural Highways" (2014)
- "Refuel" (2014)
