= Archiva 1 =

Compilation album by Asia
- Released: 26 August 1996
- Recorded: 1988–1996
- Genres: Progressive rock; album-oriented rock
- Length: 49:24
- Label: Resurgence
- Producers: Geoff Downes; John Payne

Asia chronology
Arena (1996)	Archiva 1 (1996)	Archiva 2 (1996)

Professional ratings
Review scores
Source	Rating
AllMusic	4/5 stars

Archiva is a two-volume collection of out-takes and previously unreleased tracks by English rock supergroup Asia. The first volume, designated as Archiva 1, was released on 26 August 1996 by Resurgence.

== Background ==
In late 1995, Asia had completed work on their sixth studio album, Arena. On 1 January 1996, when the group returned from the holidays to their recording studio, Electric Palace, in London, they found that a water pipe had burst and had destroyed hundreds of thousands of pounds worth of equipment. Despite the accident, a box of old tapes with a large number of archived tracks survived. These tracks, which had failed to make the previous three albums, were quickly considered for a release.

== Production ==
Archiva 1 was compiled from leftover tracks, which were recorded at various locations from 1988 to 1995. The album was mixed at Loco Studios in Monmouthshire, Wales, in 1996 by keyboard player Geoff Downes and vocalist/bassist John Payne. Chris Thorpe was responsible for the mastering. The cover artwork was designed by Rodney Matthews, who had also created the covers for Aqua and Arena, and features the Asia logotype designed by Roger Dean.

== Composition ==
=== "Heart of Gold" ===
Written in June 1991 just after Payne joined Asia, "Heart of Gold" was the second song Downes and Payne composed together. It was recorded at Advision Studios in Brighton, England, in November 1991 for inclusion on Aqua, but was left out from the album due to an abundance of tracks.

=== "Tears" ===
"Tears" was written by Downes and Johnny Warman in February 1988 and was one of the tracks recorded by the duo in the basement of Advision Studios in London from 1988 to 1989. It was first released on Downes' album Vox Humana (1992) with Max Bacon on lead vocals.

=== "Fight Against the Tide" ===
"Fight Against the Tide" was written by Payne and Andy Nye in August 1991 and was recorded at Nye's home studio for Aqua.

=== "We Fall Apart" ===
"We Fall Apart" was written by Downes and Payne in March 1995 and was one of the first tracks recorded at Electric Palace Studios in London for inclusion on Arena, but was omitted because of its industrial feel.

=== "The Mariner's Dream" ===
"The Mariner's Dream" is a short instrumental track written by Payne in March 1994, while the group were working on Aria at Parkgate Studios in Battle, East Sussex. The track was recorded in 1996 at Loco Studios in Monmouthshire, Wales.

=== "Boys from Diamond City" ===
"Boys from Diamond City" was another song composed by Downes and Warman in 1988 and recorded at Advision Studios in London. It had initially Bacon and John Wetton on vocals.

=== "A.L.O." ===
"A.L.O" evolved from a demo written by Payne and Nye for ELO Part II in September 1989 and titled "Quest for the Key". It was upgraded and recorded as a demo for Aria, but did not make its final cut. The humorous abbreviation stands for Asiatic Light Orchestra.

=== "Reality" ===
"Reality" is another out-take from Aria sessions. It was composed by Downes and Payne in November 1993 and was recorded at Parkgage Studios.

=== "I Can't Wait a Lifetime" ===
"I Can't Wait a Lifetime" was written by Payne and Nye in May 1989 and recorded at Nye's home studio. It was considered for inclusion on either Aqua or Arena, but was dropped.

=== "Dusty Road" ===
"Dusty Road" was developed from an instrumental track composed by Downes in January 1988 and titled "Burning Chrome". After Bacon had written the lyrics, the song was recorded at Advision Studios in London with Payne on lead vocals.

=== "I Believe" ===
"I Believe" was written by Payne and Nye in August 1987 and recorded at Nye's home studio.

=== "Ginger" ===
Guitar-dominated instrumental "Ginger" evolved from Arena title track. When the group were working on the title track at Electric Palace Studios, Steve Howe proposed to send him a tape copy. By the time the group received the tape back from Howe, they had already completed another song with Elliott Randall, which was put on the album instead of "Ginger".

== 2005 Inside Out Music remastered edition ==
As a part of series of remastered and expanded editions, Inside Out Music re-released Archiva as a combined two-disc set, featuring bonus tracks. The digital remastering was completed by Peter van 't Riet. The volume one was expanded by the single edit of "Anytime" and an acoustic live performance of "Open Your Eyes", which was recorded on 21 July 2003 at the XFM Radio Studios in Washington.

== Track listing ==
No.	Title	Writer(s)	Written	Length
1.	"Heart of Gold"	Geoff Downes, John Payne	June 1991	4:46
2.	"Tears"	Downes, Johnny Warman	February 1988	4:58
3.	"Fight Against the Tide"	Payne, Andy Nye	August 1991	5:30
4.	"We Fall Apart"	Downes, Payne	March 1995	4:57
5.	"The Mariner's Dream"	Payne	March 1994	1:27
6.	"Boys from Diamond City"	Downes, Warman	1988	5:43
7.	"A.L.O."	Payne, Nye	September 1989	3:40
8.	"Reality"	Downes, Payne	November 1993	4:29
9.	"I Can't Wait a Lifetime"	Payne, Nye	May 1989	3:34
10.	"Dusty Road"	Downes, Max Bacon	January 1988	4:30
11.	"I Believe"	Payne, Nye	August 1987	3:42
12.	"Ginger"	Downes, Payne, Steve Howe	1995	2:03
Total length:				49:24

2005 Inside Out Music remastered edition bonus tracks
No.	Title	Writer(s)	Length
13.	"Anytime" (edit)	Downes, Payne	3:47
14.	"Open Your Eyes" (acoustic)	John Wetton, Downes	6:29
Total length:			59:26

== Personnel ==
Asia :

- Geoff Downes – keyboards, drum programming (tracks 4, 5, 12); producer, mixing engineer
- John Payne – vocals, bass, guitar (tracks 3–5, 7, 9, 11); producer, mixing engineer

Guest musicians :

- Al Pitrelli – guitar (tracks 1, 8)
- Anthony Glynne – guitar (track 1)
- Scott Gorham – guitar (track 6)
- Adrian Dessent – guitar (track 10)
- Steve Howe – guitar (track 12)
- Andy Nye – keyboards and drum programming (tracks 3, 7–9, 11)
- Nigel Glockler – drums (tracks 1, 2, 10)
- Michael Sturgis – drums (tracks 6, 8)

=== Technical personnel ===
- Chris Thorpe – mastering engineer
- Peter van't Riet – 2005 digital remastering
- Rodney Matthews – cover illustration
- Roger Dean – Asia logotype
