= Public Life =

Studio album by Eddie Schwartz
- Released: 1984
- Recorded: 1981
- Genre: Soft rock
- Length: 36:26
- Label: WEA (Canada)
- Producers: Eddie Schwartz, David Tyson, Tony Bongiovi

Eddie Schwartz chronology
No Refuge (1981)	Public Life (1984)	Tour De Schwartz (1995)

Public Life is the third studio album by singer Eddie Schwartz. It was released in 1984 by WEA in Canada.

Lead single "Strike" was a minor hit in Canada, reaching #47 on the RPM charts. The second single, "Special Girl", was a top 20 hit on the Canadian Adult Contemporary charts. "Special Girl" became much better known in the U.S. for its near-simultaneous cover by the group America, whose version became a U.S. hit in September 1984. In the U.K., the song was a minor hit for Meat Loaf in early 1987. Asia recorded a cover of "Don't Come To Me" in 1995 for their album Arena, but was left off and was later included on the archives compilation Archiva 2.

== Track listing ==
A Side

No.	Title	Writer(s)	Length
1.	"Don't Come to Me"	Eddie Schwartz, David Tyson	4:42
2.	"Feed the Fire"	Schwartz, Tyson	4:11
3.	"Special Girl"	Schwartz, Tyson	4:09
4.	"Times Square Heart"	Schwartz, Robin Lerner	4:23

B Side

No.	Title	Writer(s)	Length
1.	"Not Tonight"	Schwartz	5:18
2.	"I've Had Enough"	Schwartz, Tyson	5:32
3.	"Strike"	Schwartz	3:32
4.	"Passing Ships (The Ballad of Henry and Lucy)"	Schwartz, Tyson	4:58

== Chart performance ==
=== Singles ===
Year	Single	Chart	Position
1984	"Strike"	RPM (Canada) Top 50	47
1984	"Special Girl"	RPM (Canada) Adult Contemporary	20

== Personnel ==
Credits are adapted from the album's liner notes.

- Eddie Schwartz – lead vocals, background vocals, guitar
- David Tyson – keyboards, bass, glockenspiel, background vocals
- Rick Derringer – guitar solos
- Peter Follett – guitar solos
- Gary Craig – drums
- Jimmy Bralower – drums

Production team

- Eddie Schwartz, David Tyson, Tony Bongiovi – producers
