= Orson (band) =

American rock band

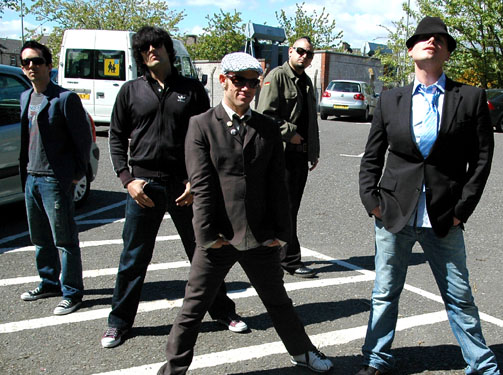
- Orson in 2006

Background information
- Origin: California, United States
- Genres: Rock; power pop
- Years active: 2000–2007
- Label: Mercury
- Past members: George Astasio; John Bentjen; Jason Pebworth; Chad Rachild; Johnny Fedevich; Chris Cano; Kevin Roentgen

Orson were an American rock band from California, formed in 2000. The band, despite being American, were much more successful in the United Kingdom.

== Career ==
Orson started its life under the name of Halogen in 2000 and consisted of vocalist Jason Pebworth, guitarists George Astasio and Chad Rachild, bassist Johnny Lonely (aka John Bentjen) and drummer Johnny Fedevich. Within the first year of the band's existence, Fedevich was replaced by Chris Cano; creating the line-up of the band that would exist for most of the rest of its history.

Their self-financed debut studio album, Bright Idea, released by Mercury Records in 2006, was produced in Los Angeles by Noah Shain and achieved chart success in the United Kingdom and Australia with the first single, "No Tomorrow". The album and single both debuted at the top of the UK Albums Chart and UK Singles Chart, respectively. Bright Idea went Platinum in the UK charts and went on to sell just under a million copies worldwide. Rachild departed the band a year after recording Bright Idea and was replaced by Kevin Roentgen.

The band first performed on UK radio during a live session on BBC Radio 2's Dermot O'Leary Show. Later, when they appeared at the 2006 Virgin Mobile V Festival in Staffordshire and Chelmsford in the UK; lead singer Jason Pebworth exclaimed: "It's good to be home!". This is because the band moved to London from Los Angeles in 2006. The band had more success in the UK than they did in their home country.

Lead singer Jason Pebworth said in an interview that the band's musical influences are Led Zeppelin, The Flaming Lips, Beck and Björk.

Other UK television appearances include Concert for Diana, Top of the Pops, Pop World, 1 Leicester Square, The Sharon Osbourne Show, The Charlotte Church Show, Davina and Top Gear.

In 2007, Orson won the Brit Award for Best International Breakthrough Act and released their second album, Culture Vultures, before deciding to disband shortly thereafter.

During the course of the band's career, Orson toured as support act for Duran Duran, Robbie Williams and Basement Jaxx as well as headlined their own UK tours multiple times from 2006–2007. Festivals they have played include Fuji Rock, T in the Park, Oxegen, V Festival, Pukkelpop and Lowlands.

== Post-Orson ==
Signed to Universal Publishing, Pebworth and George Astasio are now writers and producers under the name The Invisible Men, along with colleague Jon Shave, formerly of Xenomania. They have already had hits with artists like The Noisettes and Gabriella Cilmi and also work with Iggy Azalea and Jessie J.

Johnny Lonely continues to perform as well as manages new artists under the name Lo Pro in Los Angeles and performed with Roentgen on the Hott Mess EP.

Chris Cano works continuously as a drummer and toured with Ozomatli.

== Goldsboro ==
Chris Cano, Johnny Lonely and Kevin Roentgen formed the band Goldsboro in 2010 and independently released their debut album produced by Noah Shain in the Spring 2012. They were hand-picked by Guns N' Roses to open their Up Close and Personal Tour March 2012 "LA Takeover" shows at the Wiltern and House of Blues. Their song "Angels" appeared in Season 4 (Episode 11) of Sons of Anarchy. Their song "Great White Buffalo" has received repeated airplay by the Sex Pistols' Steve Jones on Jonesy's Jukebox on Los Angeles radio station KROQ.

== Personnel ==
=== Members ===
Final line-up

- George Astasio – guitars (2000–2007)
- Johnny Lonely – bass (2000–2007)
- Jason Pebworth – vocals (2000–2007)
- Chris Cano – drums (2000–2007)
- Kevin Roentgen – guitars (2005–2008)

Former members

- Chad Rachild – guitars (2000–2005)
- Johnny Fedevich – drums (2000)

=== Line-ups ===
2000	2000	2000–2005	2005–2008
George Astasio – guitars; Johnny Fedevich – drums; Johnny Lonely – bass; Jason Pebworth – vocals; Chad Rachild – guitars	George Astasio – guitars; Jason Byrum – drums; Johnny Lonely – bass; Jason Pebworth – vocals; Chad Rachild – guitars	George Astasio – guitars; Chris Cano – drums; Johnny Lonely – bass; Jason Pebworth – vocals; Chad Rachild – guitars	George Astasio – guitars; Chris Cano – drums; Johnny Lonely – bass; Jason Pebworth – vocals; Kevin Roentgen – guitars

== Discography ==
=== Studio albums ===
Title	Album details	Peak chart positions						Certifications
Title	Album details	AUT	FRA	GER	IRE	SWI	UK	Certifications
Bright Idea	Released: May 29, 2006; Label: Mercury; Formats: CD, digital download	51	29	48	32	38	1	BPI: Platinum
Culture Vultures	Released: October 22, 2007; Label: Mercury; Formats: CD, digital download	—	—	—	—	—	25	
"—" denotes releases that did not chart

=== Singles ===
Title	Year	Peak chart positions									Certifications	Album
Title	Year	AUT	BEL	FRA	GER	IRE	NL	NZ	SWI	UK	Certifications	Album
"No Tomorrow"	2006	21	61	17	65	26	100	40	24	1	BPI: Gold	Bright Idea
"Bright Idea"	2006	—	—	—	—	34	—	—	—	11		Bright Idea
"Happiness"	2006	—	—	—	—	—	—	—	—	27		Bright Idea
"Already Over"	2006	—	—	—	—	—	—	—	—	174		Bright Idea
"Ain't No Party"	2007	—	—	—	—	—	78	—	—	21		Culture Vultures
"—" denotes releases that did not chart
"Broken Watch" (Vocal)/ "Broken Watch" (Instrtumental) (Promo Only CD Single)	December 2007	-	-	-	-	-	-	-	-	-		Culture Vultures
"Broken Watch" (Radio Edit) (Promo Only CD-R Single)	December 2007	-	-	-	-	-	-	-	-	-		Culture Vultures

== Other contributions ==
- The Saturday Sessions: The Dermot O'Leary Show (2007, EMI) - "I Can't Go For That"

== In popular culture ==
- Their single "Tryin' to Help" featured in the 2006 romantic comedy It's a Boy Girl Thing.
