= Jeff Kollman =

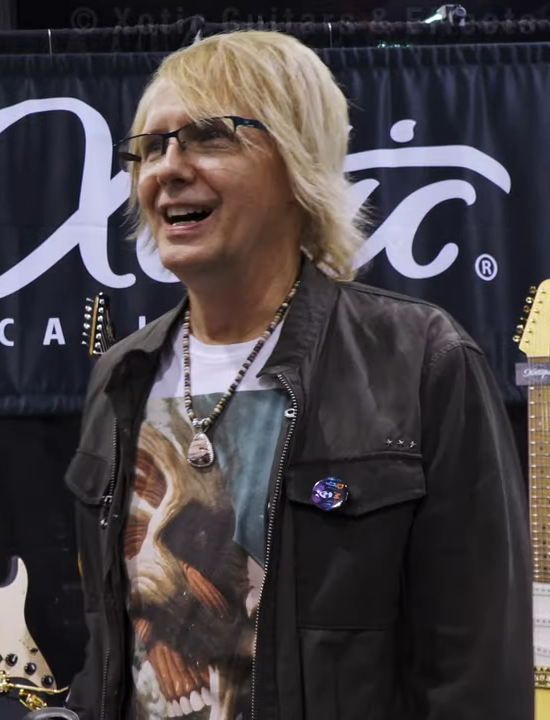
- Kollman in 2020

Background information
- Genres: Hard rock; progressive rock; instrumental rock; jazz fusion
- Occupations: Musician, songwriter, producer
- Instruments: Guitar, bass guitar, vocals
- Years active: 1984–present
- Label: Marmaduke Records
- Website: jeffkollman.com

Jeff Kollman (born July 29, 1966) is an American guitarist from Toledo, Ohio, best known for his work with Alan Parsons Live Project, Chad Smith's Bombastic Meatbats, Glenn Hughes, UFO offshoot Mogg/Way, progressive rock trio, Cosmosquad, and his 90s progressive metal band, Edwin Dare.Kollman is best known for his heavy, melodic electric guitar playing, fusing elements of Jazz harmony and creating his own brand of Rock.

In addition to Cosmosquad and the Bombastic Meatbats, he is currently a member of the Alan Parsons Live Project, Asia feat. John Payne, as well as L.A. blues rockers Bleeding Harp and has toured and gigged with Japanese superstar Eikichi Yazawa, Foreigner's Lou Gramm, former Skid Row vocalist Sebastian Bach, Chris Isaak, David Pack of Ambrosia, Michael Schenker Group, British rockers UFO, bassist Marco Mendoza and the Danny Seraphine led California Transit Authority (CTA), among others. He has also worked extensively with contemporary jazz keyboardist Lao Tizer.

Kollman has worked as a session guitarist, producer, songwriter, and actor. He has written music for movies and TV, including a commercial which ran during the 2007 Super Bowl.He has written and performed on over 250 Hollywood Movie Trailers. He is the owner and operator of Marmaduke Records, which has released the bulk of his albums. Kollman has been a Los Angeles resident since 1997 where he lives with his family.

== Biography ==
Inspired by bands including Kiss and Van Halen, and guitarist Randy Rhoads, Kollman began playing guitar when he was 12 years old. He made his recording debut at 14, after joining Ohio hardcore punk band The Stain. The Stain was featured on 1984's The Sounds of Hollywood #3 compilation and issued a full-length album, I Know the Scam, in 1986, both on L.A.-based label Mystic Records.

In 1986, Kollman formed the metal band VXN with his brother and drummer Tommy Kollman, vocalist Bryce Barnes and bassist Nep Sindel, and self-released a 6-song mini-LP in 1987, followed by the cassette-only full-length album, The Question, in 1988. The band would morph into Edwin Dare with the addition of bassist Kevin Chown and release three albums between 1992 and 1998 and build a strong fan base around parts of the Midwest through extensive touring. During this time, Kollman also released a pair of solo albums. After the demise of Edwin Dare, Kollman and Chown continued to collaborate on various projects, including Crumb Bros., JKB (Jeff Kollman Band) and, most notably, Chad Smith's Bombastic Meatbats.

Kollman moved to Phoenix, Arizona in 1995, where he worked as a session musician for Linda McCartney, Lyle Lovett, Wayman Tisdale and others. There he crossed paths with MSG drummer Shane Gaalaas and bassist Barry Sparks, with whom he formed the all-instrumental progressive rock trio, Cosmosquad. In 1997, the group released their eponymous debut, the first of four studio albums to date. In 1998, Kollman filled in for Sparks on bass for MSG on their G3 tour of Europe. That year, Mike Varney of Shrapnel Records contacted Kollman to help write and record the Permanent Mark album with Artension vocalist John West. This led to Jeff teaming up with the core of the classic UFO line-up, as Mogg/Way, for the 1999 Chocolate Box album. Kollman and UFO vocalist Phil Mogg reunited, as $ign of 4, for another album collaboration, Dancing with St. Peter, released in fall 2002.

In 2003, after a UK tour with $ign of 4, Kollman began working with bassist/vocalist Glenn Hughes (of Deep Purple fame) and drummer Robin DiMaggio in a short-lived, pop-oriented trio named Shape 68. He also produced, co-wrote and played guitar for Hughes' 2003 hard rock album Songs in the Key of Rock and would become Hughes' new touring guitar player. Also in 2003, Kollman co-produced the HTP 2 project, featuring Hughes and former Rainbow vocalist Joe Lynn Turner.

In 2005, Kollman filled in for UFO bassist Pete Way for the duration of the band's U.S. summer tour. He earned his SAG card with a part in the Hank Garland biographical movie Crazy, portraying guitarist Barry Galbraith.

in 2007, Kollman and collaborator Jono Brown landed a Super Bowl commercial for Garmin GSP navigation systems. The 30second spot aired just before Super Bowl XLI half-time and featured vocals by Grim Reaper frontman Steve Grimmett. That same year, Kollman, Red Hot Chili Peppers drummer Chad Smith and keyboardist Ed Roth, who had met playing with Glenn Hughes, formed an all-instrumental band inspired by their shared love of 70s funk rock and fusion. Still unnamed at the time, the group, rounded out by Kollman's former Edwin Dare bandmate Kevin Chown on bass, debuted at the 2008 NAMM Show in Anaheim, California. The band became Chad Smith's Bombastic Meatbats upon the release of their debut album, Meet the Meatbats, in 2009. More Meat followed in 2010, and a live recording, Live Meat and Potatoes, in 2012.

Kollman would team up with Glenn Hughes for a tour of Europe in 2009, documented via the Live In Wolverhampton 2-CD and DVD release, recorded over the course of two nights, June 6 and 7, in the singer's hometown of Bilston, England. Returning to the UK in 2011, Kollman appeared at the Goodwood Festival of Speed by special invitation of Lord March, playing the Star Spangled Banner on the roof of Goodwood House on July 4; Brian May of Queen also performed.

In 2012, Kollman released Silence in the Corridor, his first studio solo album in more than a dozen years. The album's title track is a tribute to Gary Moore, and the title was inspired by Moore's 1982 solo album, Corridors of Power. It was followed by the release of two digital-only singles, "Waiting in Dark Places" and "Electric Overload", the latter a duet with fellow guitarist Jeff Marshall.

In the early morning hours of December 15, 2012, Kollman's brother Tommy was shot and killed by a sheriff's deputy in Fort Myers Beach, Florida. A memorial concert event was held in the brothers' old stomping grounds in South Toledo, Ohio, on May 24 and 25, 2013, with Cosmosquad headlining. Kollman released a digital single, "Brother to Brother", as a tribute in July 2013.

Kollman joined drummer Ray Luzier, bassist Billy Sheehan and DJ Sluggo for a performance at the 25th anniversary Guitar Center Drum-Off at L.A.'s Club Nokia on January 18, 2014 where he also played with Bombastic Meatbats who were joined by special guest Steve Lukather. He released two new digital-only singles, "Eve of Reflection" and "Old Kentucky Thunder", on January 27, 2014. Two more digital singles, "In The Hills of Granada" and "Another Rainy Saturday", were made available March 17, 2014.

In February 2014, Kollman filled in for guitarist Marc Bonilla with California Transit Authority (CTA), led by legendary founding member and drummer of Chicago, Danny Seraphine, for a handful of U.S. East Coast shows. Later that same month he would join old friend Mark Mikel on the inaugural Progressive Nation at Sea cruise, masterminded by former Dream Theater drummer Mike Portnoy. Released on YouTube in March 2014, Kollman collaborated with fusion trio 107и on a cover of Bill Bruford's "Beelzebub" off his 1978 solo album, Feels Good to Me.

In July 2014, Kollman released the mostly acoustic Hills of Granada album, including "In the Hills of Granada", "Another Rainy Saturday", "Old Kentucky Thunder", "Eve of Reflection", "Brother to Brother", "Electric Overload" and "Waiting In Dark Places", all previously released as digital singles.

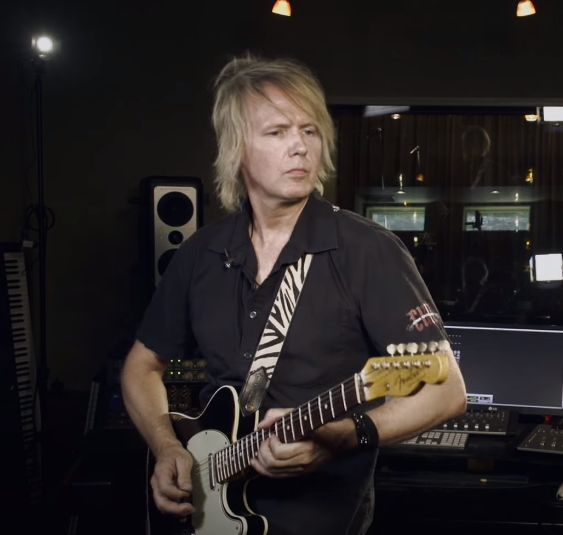
Kollman in 2016.

After featuring on the 2012 "Seasons Will Change" single and video with Asia Featuring John Payne, Kollman also took part in the recording of 2014's Recollections: A Tribute to British Prog, which contains covers by King Crimson, ELP, Yes, Genesis, and The Alan Parsons Project, among others. The aforementioned "Seasons Will Change" would re-surface in early 2018 as part of the eponymous debut album by Dukes Of The Orient, spearheaded by John Payne and keyboardist Erik Norlander.

In the summer of 2015, Kollman joined former Skid Row vocalist Sebastian Bach for a run of U.S. dates and for a second consecutive year toured Japan with vocalist Eikichi Yazawa, highlighted by the 'Rock In Dome' show at Tokyo's giant Tokyo Dome on September 5, 2015, documented via the Rock In Dome Blu-Ray and DVD release. Kollman was back with Yazawa for yet another tour of Japan in late 2016.

In the fall of 2016, Kollman released Jeff & Tommy Kollman - Teenage Metal Years, a compilation of early all-instrumental demos recorded in 1983 and '84 on a Fostex X-15 4-track recorder in their parents' basement with his late brother Tommy on drums.

Kollman would also surface in yet another progressive rock project, Artifact, alongside vocalist Jeff Scott Soto, drummer Joel Taylor, flutist/saxophonist Gary Meek, bassist Eugene Sharikov, and keyboardist Edward Tsiselsky whose debut single Life Is Good was issued in October 2016; the band's full-length debut, also titled Life Is Good, surfaced in August 2017 under the name RTfact. Everyone but Soto had previously worked together on the more jazz oriented 2015 album Revelation by Yuri Volodarsky & Friends. Kollman, Taylor and Meek had also taken part in recording the yet-to-be-released Vision of Sound - The King Crimson Story tribute album, a Russian-American collaborate effort spearheaded by Sharikov and keyboardist Dmitry Ilugdin.

In early 2017, Kollman returned with his long running progressive metal/fusion trio, Cosmosquad, and their first new release in a decade, titled The Morbid Tango. On May 9, it was announced that Kollman would join the Alan Parsons Live Project for their 13-city "I Robot & Greatest Hits" tour of Germany that same month. He has since joined Parsons on a permanent basis and subsequently appeared on his 2019 album, The Secret.

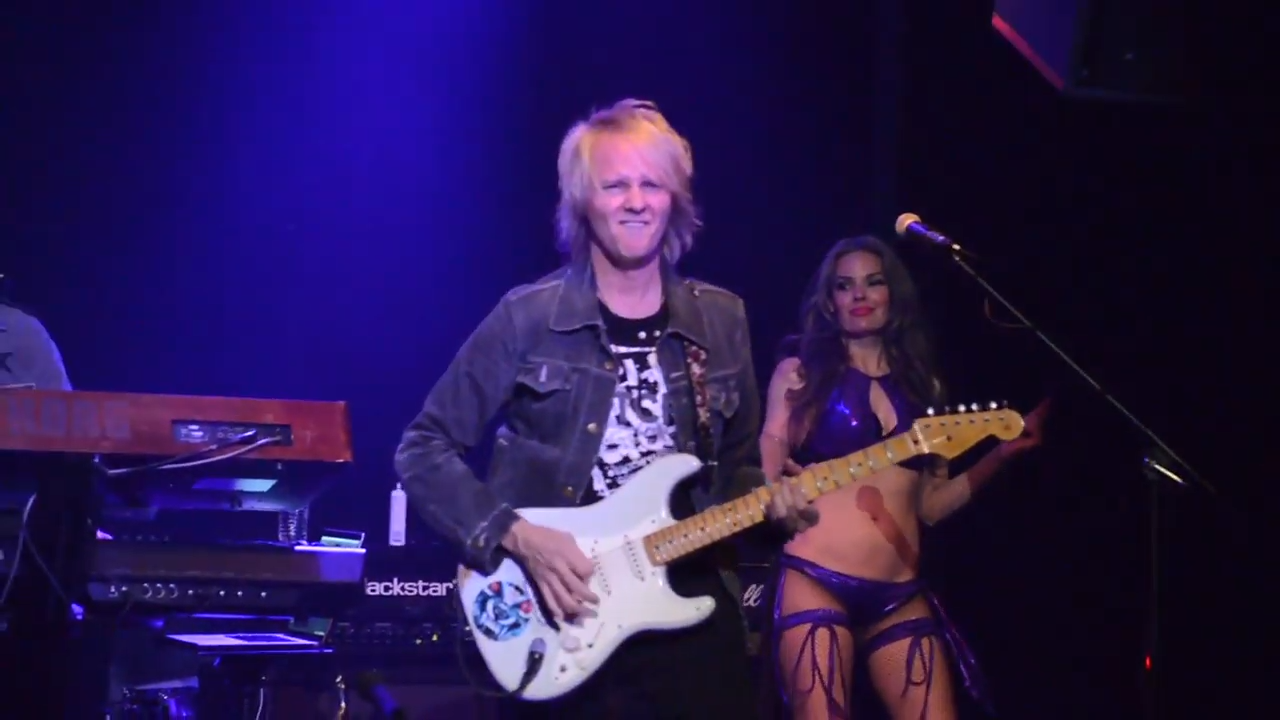
Kollman in 2018.

In September 2017, Kollman reunited with Glenn Hughes for a tour of Australia and New Zealand performing the music of Deep Purple focusing on the band's Mk III and Mk IV eras that featured Hughes. Kollman also toured the U.S. with Hughes in August and September 2018. More recently, Kollman has played guitar for legendary vocalist Lou Gramm of Foreigner fame, with Asia feat. John Payne becoming Gramm's de facto new backing band in 2019.

On March 18, 2021, Kollman released the song "Superstring Theory" as a digital single on his Bandcamp site and announced a May 21 release date for his sixth instrumental solo album, East of Heaven, with contributions from long time collaborators Shane Gaalaas and Jono Brown on drums, Cirque du Soleil music director, Paul Shihadeh, on bass, and his Eikichi Yazawa band mate, Guy Allison, on keyboards.

On April 30, 2021, Kollman released a newly re-discovered version of "A Jam For Jason", which originally appeared on Warmth in the Wilderness: A Tribute to Jason Becker in 2001, to raise funds for ALS stricken musician Jason Becker. Dubbed Cosmosquad & The Jasonauts - "A Jam For Jason MMXXI", the Bandcamp exclusive features the original Cosmosquad line-up of Kollman, Shane Gaalaas, and Barry Sparks, and lead guitar contributions from Chris Poland, Vinnie Moore, Patrick Lachman, and Steve Morse.

2022 saw Kollman tour with both the Alan Parsons Live Project and Ekichi Yazawa in Japan. He also played on Parsons' latest studio album, From the New World, co-writing the songs "The Secret" and "Obstacles". On January 13, 2023, he released the Miles Davis inspired digital single, "Green for Miles", a collaboration with Yazawa band mate, Guy Allison, and announced that he was working on a new studio album. The line-up would include Shane Gaalaas and Steve Jenkins on drums and bass, respectively, as well as special guests such as Red Hot Chili Peppers and Bombastic Meatbats drummer, Chad Smith.

== Discography ==
Solo

- 1989 Schizoid
- 1995 Into The Unknown
- 1999 Shedding Skin
- 2006 Guitar Screams Live!
- 2012 Silence In The Corridor
- 2012 Waiting In Dark Places (digital single)
- 2013 Electric Overload (digital single)
- 2013 Brother to Brother (digital single)
- 2014 Eve of Reflection (digital single)
- 2014 Old Kentucky Thunder (digital single)
- 2014 Another Rainy Saturday (digital single)
- 2014 Hills of Granada
- 2014 In the Hills of Granada (digital single)
- 2021 Superstring Theory (digital single)
- 2021 East of Heaven
- 2023 Green for Miles (digital single)

with Alan Parsons

- 2019 The Secret
- 2021 The NeverEnding Show: Live In The Netherlands CD/DVD
- 2022 One Note Symphony: Live In Tel Aviv CD/DVD
- 2022 From the New World

with Asia feat. John Payne

- 2012 Seasons Will Change (single)
- 2014 Recollections: A Tribute to British Prog

with Chad Smith's Bombastic Meatbats

- 2009 Meat the Meatbats
- 2010 More Meat
- 2012 Live Meat and Potatoes

with Glenn Hughes

- 2003 Songs in the Key of Rock
- 2009 Live In Wolverhampton 2 (Official Bootleg) DVD
- 2011 Live In Wolverhampton

with Lao Tizer

- 2001 Golden Soul
- 2006 Diversify
- 2009 Passages
- 2010 TIZER live
- 2012 Downbeat

with Cosmosquad

- 1997 Cosmosquad
- 2002 Squadrophenia
- 2002 Live at the Baked Potato
- 2003 Best of Cosmosquad
- 2007 Acid Test
- 2008 Lights... Camera... 'Squad! DVD
- 2017 The Morbid Tango
- 2021 A Jam For Jason MMXXI (digital single)

with Edwin Dare

- 1992 The Unthinkable Deed
- 1994 Can't Break Me
- 1998 My Time to Die

Additional Discography

- 1986 The Stain – I Know the Scam
- 1987 VXN – s/t EP
- 1988 VXN - The Question
- 1995 Kevin Chown – Freudian Slip
- 1997 Donna Roth – Like I Do
- 1998 John West – Permanent Mark
- 1999 Mogg/Way – Chocolate Box
- 2002 $ign of 4 – Dancing with St. Peter
- 2004 JKB (Jeff Kollman Band) – Bleeding The Soul
- 2005 Crumb Bros. – State of Your Mind
- 2010 Jeff Kollman Band – Empower... Devour!!!
- 2011 Pervadelic – Songs For Pervs
- 2013 Kevin Chown – Light the Way EP
- 2014 Mark Mikel - 35th Anniversary Concert DVD
- 2015 Eikichi Yazawa - Rock In Dome DVD
- 2016 Jeff & Tommy Kollman - Teenage Metal Years
- 2018 Bleeding Harp - Truth EP

Compilations, session work & guest appearances

- 1984 Various – The Sounds of Hollywood #3 (w/ The Stain)
- 1985 Various – Let's Die (w/ The Stain)
- 1988 Various – Revenge of the Kamakazi Stegosaurus From Outer Space! (w/ The Stain)
- 1991 Various – Resume Vol. 1: Burnin'
- 1998 The Original Moon – Graffiti
- 2000 Various – The Blues Tribute to Lynyrd Skynyrd
- 2000 Various – Slave to the Power – The Iron Maiden Tribute (w/ Cosmosquad)
- 2001 Various – Warmth in the Wilderness: A Tribute to Jason Becker (w/ Cosmosquad)
- 2002 Mark Boals – Edge of the World
- 2003 Rob Rock – Eyes of Eternity
- 2003 Hughes Turner Project – HTP 2
- 2003 Various – A Tribute to the Beast, Vol. 2 (w/ Cosmosquad)
- 2004 Barefoot Bride – s/t
- 2004 Vitalij Kuprij – Forward and Beyond
- 2005 Christopher Maloney – The Terrors of Intimacy
- 2005 Shane Gaalaas – Hinge
- 2007 Various - ...And Back to Earth Again - Ten Years of MeteorCity (w/ Cosmosquad)
- 2010 Ray Reindeau - Atmospheres
- 2010 Various – Mr. Bolin's Late Night Revival - Tommy Bolin Tribute
- 2012 Prashant Aswani - Visions
- 2015 Shane Gaalaas - Bitter Suites From The Red Room
- 2015 Yuri Volodarsky & Friends - Revelation
- 2016 Erik Norlander - Surreal
- 2016 Artifact - Life Is Good (single)
- 2017 RTfact - Life Is Good
- 2018 Dukes Of The Orient - Dukes of the Orient
- 2021 Agnes - Hegemony Shift
- 2022 Lana Lane - Neptune Blue
