= Asia featuring John Payne =

British–American rock band

Asia Featuring John Payne
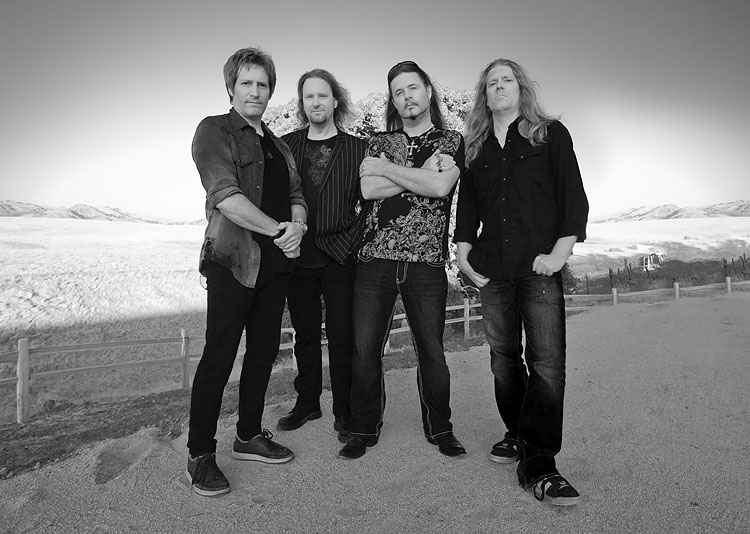
- 2011–2012 lineup. Left to right: Jay Schellen, Erik Norlander, John Payne, Bruce Bouillet

Background information
- Origin: Los Angeles
- Genres: Progressive rock, hard rock, AOR
- Years active: 2007–present
- Labels: Devgel, Sony Music Japan, Voiceprint, Inside Out
- Members: John Payne; Jeffrey Kollman; Ryo Okumoto; Aaron Olson
- Past members: Erik Norlander; Guthrie Govan; Mitch Perry; Bruce Bouillet; Jay Schellen; Moni Scaria; Johnny Fedevich; Jamie Hosmer; Mark Cole; Walter Ino; Francis Dunnery
- Website: johnpayneasia.com

Asia Featuring John Payne is a British–American rock group band formed in 2007 following a schism in the lineup of Asia. The band is a continuation of singer and bassist John Payne's career as the band's frontman from 1991 to 2006, performing songs recorded before and during this time. In December 2017, Payne and keyboardist Erik Norlander formed a new group, Dukes of the Orient, with various members and ex-members of Asia Featuring John Payne as collaborators. Asia Featuring John Payne remains active as a touring stage show.

== History ==
=== Asia before John Payne ===
Asia are a supergroup formed in 1981 by John Wetton (formerly of King Crimson, Uriah Heep and U.K.), Steve Howe (formerly of Yes), Carl Palmer (formerly of Atomic Rooster, Emerson, Lake & Palmer) and Geoff Downes (formerly of Yes and the Buggles). The group had a successful career with their eponymous debut album, released in March 1982, receiving considerable commercial success, spending nine weeks at number one in the U.S. album chart and selling over 4 million copies in the U.S. alone. Wetton and Downes became the core songwriters in the band. Howe had left before the band released their third album, while Wetton left the band in 1991.

=== John Payne in Asia ===
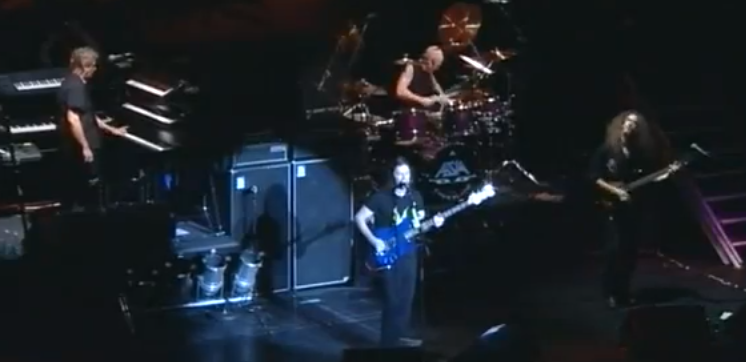
Asia in 2001 (L-R: Geoff Downes, John Payne, Chris Slade and Guthrie Govan).

In 1991, Downes invited John Payne to join a new lineup of the band, and together they enlisted new musicians. The first album with this lineup was Aqua, released in 1992. In addition to Downes and Payne, the album featured guest appearances by Palmer and a returning Howe. Palmer, committed to an Emerson, Lake & Palmer reunion, was able to play on just three songs and left the band before touring. The live shows also featured Howe (whose presence was heavily promoted) who took the stage after the fifth song. Howe did not continue with the band after Aqua.

Downes and Payne continued as Asia, releasing multiple albums, but they struggled to maintain a stable lineup around them. 2001's Aura featured multiple guitarists, including another guest appearance from Howe and a new player Guthrie Govan. Among the drummers on the album was Chris Slade, who had briefly worked with the band in 1999. A stable touring lineup now emerged of Payne, Downes, Govan and Slade. This lineup went on to release Silent Nation in 2004. In August 2005, Slade left the group to be replaced by Jay Schellen (who had helped on some writing sessions for Silent Nation). After a short period of further touring, the new band started work on an album, tentatively entitled Architect of Time, which was originally planned for release in 2006.

=== The split ===
In early 2006, the partnership between Downes and Payne was dissolved when Downes left for a reunion of the original band lineup under the Asia name, a breakup that Payne described as "painful". The existing lineup minus Downes, i.e. Payne, Govan and Schellen, continued working together. They recruited Ryo Okumoto on keyboards to form new band GPS, using some of the material planned for Architect of Time on their debut album, Window to the Soul (2006).

On May 9, 2006, Geoff Downes, John Wetton, Carl Palmer and Steve Howe contractually allowed John Payne to continue as "Asia Featuring John Payne,". Payne also took a significant portion of the rights to the 'Asia' band name following Downes' departure. Payne regrouped ex-members of Asia and formed the new band Asia Featuring John Payne in May 2007 with Payne on vocals/bass, Guthrie Govan on guitar and Jay Schellen on drums. Later that year, Erik Norlander was announced on keyboards.

The first release under this name at the end of 2007 was a live recording of the late 2005 Asia lineup of Downes, Payne, Govan and Schellen, entitled Extended Versions in the U.S. and Scandinavia in the UK.

=== Touring and studio work ===
Asia Featuring John Payne toured the US through 2008. In 2009, the band released an EP entitled Military Man. The band has continued to tour the US since 2008, performing songs from the entire history of Asia, both before and during Payne's time in the band. In 2009 Govan was replaced by Mitch Perry, a session musician with experience touring with major acts including Cher, Michael Schenker and Edgar Winter. Payne, Govan, and Schellen are also continuing work as GPS.

The band signed a three-album deal with Sony Music Japan. A studio album, originally called Architect of Time (the name ultimately used for a Payne side project instead) and then Americana, was underway and expected for release late in 2012, but was delayed. A digital single and video "Seasons Will Change" was released in late 2012.

In August 2011, the band played summer tour dates in the US with a new guitarist, Bruce Bouillet. In 2012, the band announced that Bouillet had left to pursue solo work, replacing him with a dual guitar lineup of Moni Scaria and Jeff Kollman. Also in 2012, the group released a live album "Risen Sun" on Sony Japan, which was the third release of Extended Versions with a different title. On April 15, 2014 the group released an album of covers called Recollections: A Tribute to British Prog.

In 2014, Norlander was replaced by Ryo Okumoto from GPS. Schellen stopped working with the band in 2016, and started filling in for Alan White in Yes alongside Geoff Downes.

=== Dukes of the Orient and future plans ===
Material by Payne and Norlander for the Asia Featuring John Payne album to be called Americana, including the single "Seasons Will Change", was then released under the name Dukes of the Orient instead in 2018. Payne and Norlander described this decision as coming out respect for the passing of John Wetton, also citing this material was written by them and not under Asia. Asia featuring John Payne (without Norlander) has continued as a live act.

In 2019, AFJP toured on a bill with former Foreigner singer Lou Gramm, also acting as his back-up band.

In 2022, Payne announced a new Asia Featuring John Payne album titled Aviana is in the works, and stated the album cover had already been done by Rodney Matthews.

=== New line-up (2025) ===
On January 31, 2025, Asia Featuring John Payne performed a show in Uncasville, Connecticut (at Wolf Den @ Mohegan Sun) with a new line-up made of John Payne on vocals, bass and guitar, Mark Cole on guitar and bass, Walter Ino on keyboards and Aaron Olson on drums.

A new line-up was then announced for dates in August 2025 and beyond with Payne, Olson, Ryo Okumoto returning on keys and Francis Dunnery on guitar. However, Dunnery left after one show.

== Personnel ==
Current members

- John Payne – lead vocals, bass, additional guitar (2007–present)
- Jeffrey Kollman – guitar, backing vocals (2012–2025, 2025–present)
- Ryo Okumoto – keyboards (2014–2017, 2025–present)
- Aaron Olson – drums, percussion (2022–present)

Former members

- Erik Norlander – keyboards, backing vocals (2007–2014)
- Guthrie Govan – guitar, backing vocals (2007–2009)
- Mitch Perry – guitar, backing vocals (2009–2011)
- Bruce Bouillet – guitar (2011–2012)
- Jay Schellen – drums, percussion, backing vocals (2007–2016)
- Moni Scaria – guitar, backing vocals (2012–2025)
- Johnny Fedevich – drums, percussion (2017–2022)
- Jamie Hosmer – keyboards, backing vocals (2017–2025)
- Mark Cole – guitar, bass (2025)
- Walter Ino – keyboards (2025)
- Francis Dunnery – guitar, backing vocals (2025)

== Discography ==
Albums

- 2014: Recollections: A Tribute to British Prog

EPs & singles

- 2009: Military Man (EP)
- 2012: "Seasons Will Change" (digital single and video, later re-released on Dukes of the Orient's debut album)

Live albums

- 2007: Extended Versions/Scandinavia (re-released as Risen Sun in 2012)
