= Return to Japan =

Live album by Lana Lane
- Released: 2004
- Genre: Rock

Lana Lane chronology
Winter Sessions (2003)	Return to Japan (2004)	Storybook: Tales from Europe and Japan (2004)

Return to Japan is the second live album by symphonic rock vocalist, Lana Lane, released in 2004. The album is Lane's 10th album release overall (by U.S. release only), while also being her 15th album over (by Japanese release). Unlike Lane's first live album, Live in Japan, this album was not only released in Japan, but was also released in the U.S.

The album spans over two discs, featuring live concerts Lana has performed from 1998–2002.

- NOTE: The first 4 tracks featured on Disc One are actually one performance, as those 4 songs are performed as a medley.

== Track listing ==
=== Disc one ===
No.	Title	Length
1.	"Dark Water Part III"	1:59
2.	"Fanfare for The Dragon Isle"	0:43
3.	"Garden of the Moon"	1:18
4.	"In the Hall of the Ocean Queen"	0:40
5.	"Escher's Staircase"	6:09
6.	"The Beast Within You"	5:41
7.	"Rainbow's End"	7:06
8.	"Queen of the Ocean"	7:04
9.	"Project Shangri-La"	5:37
10.	"Evolution Revolution"	8:29
11.	"Frankenstein Unbound"	6:16
12.	"Athena's Shadow"	4:55
13.	"Night Falls"	7:42
14.	"Astrology Prelude"	3:31
15.	"Redemption Part II"	1:12
16.	"Secrets of Astrology"	5:43

=== Disc Two ===
No.	Title	Length
1.	"Take a Breath"	4:25
2.	"Stardust"	4:56
3.	"Symphony of Angels"	5:20
4.	"Dream On"	4:02
5.	"Alexandria"	5:15
6.	"Autumn Leaves"	4:03
7.	"Let Heaven In"	6:51
8.	"Dreamcurrents"	0:29
9.	"Avalon"	4:22
10.	"Seasons End"	4:50
11.	"In the Court of the Crimson King"	9:09
12.	"Long Live Rock 'n' Roll"	4:53
