= Already Over =

Already Over may refer to:

- "Already Over", 2007 single by Red, from End of Silence
- "Already Over", song by Orson, from Bright Idea
- "Already Over", song by Sabrina Carpenter, from Emails I Can't Send
