= No Refuge =

Studio album by Eddie Schwartz
- Released: 1981
- Genres: Soft rock, AOR
- Length: 33:06
- Label: A&M
- Producers: Eddie Schwartz, David Tyson

Eddie Schwartz chronology
Schwartz (1980)	No Refuge (1981)	Public Life (1984)

No Refuge is the second studio album by singer Eddie Schwartz. It was released in late 1981 by A&M Records in Canada, and appeared on Atco in the US in early 1982.

Lead single "All Our Tomorrows" reached #32 in Canada, and #28 in the U.S. Billboard Hot 100, and was also a significant hit on the adult contemporary charts. The follow-up single "Over the Line" was also a top 40 hit in Canada, peaking at #38, but didn't fare as well in the U.S., reaching #91.

The single "No Refuge" hit #40 in the U.S. Rock Tracks chart, compiled by Billboard.

== Track listing ==
A Side

No.	Title	Writer(s)	Length
1.	"No Refuge"	Eddie Schwartz	5:08
2.	"Spirit of the Night"	Schwartz	4:27
3.	"Tonight"	Schwartz	3:46
4.	"Good with Your Love"	Schwartz	3:48

B Side

No.	Title	Writer(s)	Length
1.	"Heart on Fire"	Schwartz, David Tyson	2:47
2.	"Over the Line"	Schwartz, Tyson	3:44
3.	"Auction Block"	Schwartz, Robin Lerner	4:06
4.	"All Our Tomorrows"	Schwartz, Tyson	5:20

== Charts ==
=== Album ===
Chart (1982)	Peak position
US Top LPs & Tape (Billboard)	195
US Rock Albums (Billboard)	22

=== Singles ===
Year	Single	Chart	Peak position
1982	"All Our Tomorrows"	RPM (Canada) Top 50	32
1982	"All Our Tomorrows"	RPM (Canada) Contemporary Adult	23
1982	"All Our Tomorrows"	Billboard (US) Hot 100	28
1982	"All Our Tomorrows"	Billboard (US) Adult Contemporary	40
1982	"Over the Line"	RPM (Canada) Top 50	38
1982	"Over the Line"	Billboard (US) Hot 100	91
1982	"No Refuge"	Billboard (US) Rock Tracks	40

== Personnel ==
Credits are adapted from the album's liner notes.

- Eddie Schwartz – lead vocals, guitar
- David Tyson – keyboards, electronic bass
- Peter Follett – guitar solos
- Bob Wilson – bass
- Gary Craig – drums
- Dick Smith – percussion
- Jim McGrath – trumpet
- Steve McDade – trumpet
- John Johnson – alto and tenor saxophones
- Bruce Gregg – trombone

Production team

- Eddie Schwartz, David Tyson – producers
- Mike Jones – engineer, mixing
