= Secrets of Astrology =

- Cover art by Michael Parkes

Studio album by Lana Lane
- Released: 19 April 2000
- Recorded: RS29, Waalwijk, The Electric Castle, Rijsbergen and Sync Music, Breda, The Netherlands, The Walden West Recorder, Woodland Hills, California; December 1999-February 2000
- Genre: Symphonic rock, symphonic metal
- Length: 72:37
- Label: LMP / Inside Out Music / SPV (Europe and US); Avalon (Japan)
- Producer: Erik Norlander

Lana Lane chronology
Best of Lana Lane 1995 - 1999 (1999)	Secrets of Astrology (2000)	Ballad Collection II (2000)

Professional ratings
Review scores
Source	Rating
Allmusic	3/5 stars

Secrets of Astrology, released in 2000, is the fifth album, but the fourth studio recorded album, by symphonic rock vocalist, Lana Lane. Though this album is Lane's fifth album release in the US, it is her eighth in Japan. The album was recorded in the Netherlands and in Los Angeles and mixed in the Netherlands by Oscar Holleman. Mastering was executed at Abbey Road Studios in London.

The album contains 13 songs, whereas the 13th track is listed as a bonus track. In the North American and Japanese releases of Secrets of Astrology, the bonus track is a song entitled, "Romeo and Juliet", a song Lane had recorded during the recording sessions for this album. In the European release of Secrets of Astrology, the bonus track is a song entitled, "Rhapsody", a song that Lane had recorded during the recording sessions for her 1998 album, Queen of the Ocean.

== Track listing ==
All tracks are written by Erik Norlander, except where indicated.

North American & Japanese Release
No.	Title	Lyrics	Music	Length
1.	"Astrology Prelude"			3:59
2.	"Secrets of Astrology"			8:33
3.	"Alexandria"	Lana Lane	Lana Lane	5:16
4.	"Raining"			6:17
5.	"The Bell"	Lane, Norlander	Lane, Norlander	5:16
6.	"Speed of Sound"			5:24
7.	"Under the Sun"			4:43
8.	"Tarot"	Lane, Norlander	Lane, Arjen Anthony Lucassen	4:47
9.	"Asherah"			6:51
10.	"Guardian Angel"	Lane, Norlander	Mark McCrite	6:41
11.	"Long Winter Dreams"			5:49
12.	"Astrology Postlude"			3:38
13.	"Romeo and Juliet"	Lane, Norlander	Lane, Norlander

European release bonus track
No.	Title	Lyrics	Music	Length
13.	"Rhapsody"	Norlander	Norlander, McCrite	5:25

== Personnel ==
- Lana Lane - vocals
- Erik Norlander - keyboards, mellotron, organ, piano, producer, engineer, mixing, mastering
- Tony Franklin - bass, acoustic guitar, percussion, backing vocals
- Arjen Anthony Lucassen - guitars, acoustic guitar, bass, mellotron on track 8
- David Victor - guitars
- Mark McCrite - acoustic guitar, mellotron on track 1
- Robert Soeterboek - harmony vocals
- Ed Warby - drums
- Istvan Szeker - violin
- Novi Novog - viola
- Cameron Stone - cello
- Oscar Holleman - engineer, mixing
- Stephen van Haestregt - engineer
