= Fair Trade Music =

- Abbreviation: FTMI
- Formation: 1 January 2010
- Headquarters: Toronto, Canada
- Key people: Safwan Javed (President); Zoe Cunningham (Gen. Sec.)
- Website: fairtrademusicinternational.org

Fair Trade Music is an independent movement dedicated to building an ethical, sustainable and transparent music ecosystem equitable for everyone in the music value chain. It aims to encourage the emergence of a music streaming economy that fairly remunerates songwriters and composers for their work, and to give consumers and creators the information they need to make ethical choices when producing, distributing, streaming or purchasing music.

Adopted as a core program by the International Council of Music Creators (CIAM), the campaign is overseen by an independent not-for-profit organisation called Fair Trade Music International, headquartered in Canada and backed by over 500,000 music creators worldwide. The board is made up of songwriters and composers with industry specialists as advisors, all volunteers. It includes renown Canadian songwriter, Eddie Schwartz, and the contemporary Italian composer, Lorenzo Ferrero.

== History ==
The Fair Trade Music concept began at the University of Ottawa in 2007 when Professor Jeremy DeBeer introduced the concept to his Digital Music and the Law seminar classes. Soon thereafter, Professor DeBeer and one of his students, Safwan Javed, explored developing an accompanying certification process that would provide clear, ethical choices to music consumers.

In 2010, Javed joined the board of Canada's largest music creator organization, the Songwriters Association of Canada (S.A.C.), who immediately embraced Fair Trade Music and began carrying the project forward. In 2012, S.A.C. joined with other Canadian and US-based music creator organizations to form Music Creators North America (MCNA) and the initiative quickly took hold.

Fair Trade Music International was incorporated in Toronto, Canada in 2015 and the following year, was officially adopted as a main campaign for CIAM, which brought hundreds of thousands of music creators from Africa, Latin and South America, Asia, Europe and North America to the campaign. As quoted Jean-Michel Jarre, then President of CISAC in his 2015 call on UN for a fairer creative ecosystem: "Equally important in our eyes are the rights of creators. Without these moral and economic rights, creators would be deprived of ways to sustain a living and continue to create freely, and would also lose control over the use of their works. But for this to happen, creators need to be granted fair remuneration for the use of their creative works. In the music sector, we have launched the Fair Trade Music project to address this issue."

== The Fair Trade Music Study ==
Fair Trade Music was originally based upon the 2014 Study Concerning Fair Compensation for Music Creators in the Digital Age commissioned by MCNA and CIAM. Written by Pierre Lalonde, former director of economic research for the Copyright Board of Canada, the report presented comprehensive, empirical evidence that suggested an alternative business model was urgently needed if the digital economy was to be sustainable.

According to Fair Trade Music, the report made three key observations: music as undervalued by digital music platforms, the split of revenues as imbalanced, and licensing deals as lacking transparency. Based upon these findings, the study concluded that fair trade models could prove more effective in creating a virtuous value chain than government regulation because laws simply could not keep pace.

== Activities ==
The Fair Trade Music movement vowels to be active in three areas: using education, lobbying and expert comment to raise awareness and drive an understanding of the challenges facing music creators; issuing and managing a Supporter’s Seal to highlight individuals and organisations that have pledged to support the principals of the movement; and finally, operating a certification program for individual music releases based upon a developed set of criteria for ethical behaviour.

== See also ==
- Songwriters Association of Canada
- Songwriters Guild of America
- European Composer and Songwriter Alliance
