= Culture Vultures =

Studio album by Orson
- Released: October 22, 2007
- Label: Mercury Records (UK)

Orson chronology
Bright Idea (2006)	Culture Vultures (2007)

Professional ratings
Review scores
Source	Rating
AllMusic	4.5/5 stars
NME	3/10 stars
Rocklouder	1/5 stars
Yahoo! Music UK	3.5/5 stars

Culture Vultures is a second and final album by American band Orson. The album was released on October 22, 2007 but it leaked online on October 20, 2007.

The album did not follow the success of their debut, 'Bright Idea', which charted at #1 on the UK Album Chart, and only reached a position of #25 in its debut week. "Ain't No Party", the lead single, only peaked at #21, failing to repeat the success of the lead single off their previous album, "No Tomorrow", which charted at #1. The album sold 8020 copies in its opening week.

== Track listing ==
All lyrics written by Jason Pebworth; all music written by George Astasio, Chris Cano, Johnny Lonely, Pebworth, and Kevin Roentgen, except where noted.

1. "Radio" - 3:42
2. "Ain't No Party" (Astasio, Cano, Lonely, Pebworth, Roentgen, Julian Gallagher, Chad Rachild, Noah Shain) - 3:19
3. "Broken Watch" - 3:43
4. "The Contortionist" - 4:04
5. "Gorgeous" - 3:20
6. "Debbie's Gone" - 2:54
7. "Where You Are" - 4:07
8. "Little Miss Lost & Found" - 4:22
9. "Northern Girl" - 3:53
10. "Cool Cops" - 4:26
11. "Everybody!" - 3:10

== Personnel ==
- George Astasio - guitars
- Chris Cano - drums
- Johnny Lonely - bass
- Jason Pebworth - vocals
- Kevin Roentgen - guitars

== Release history ==
Region	Date
United Kingdom	October 22, 2007
World	February 22, 2008
