= No Tomorrow (Orson song) =

2006 single by Orson

Single by Orson

from the album Bright Idea
- B-side: "The Okay Song"; "Everything"; "Jessie"
- Released: February 27, 2006
- Studio: White Buffalo (Hollywood, California)
- Length: 2:47
- Label: Mercury
- Songwriters: George Astasio; John Bentjen; Jason Pebworth; Chad Rachild; Chris Cano; Kevin Roentgen
- Producers: Noah Shain; Orson; Chad Radchild

Orson singles chronology
"No Tomorrow" (2006)	"Bright Idea" (2006)

"No Tomorrow" is a song by American pop rock band Orson. It was released on February 27, 2006, as their debut single and as the lead single from their debut studio album, Bright Idea (2006). Despite entering the UK Singles Chart at number five, "No Tomorrow" climbed to the top spot two weeks after its debut, which earned the band the record for the lowest-ever weekly sales of a UK number-one single, selling only 17,694 copies.

The single went on to be the UK's 12th-best-selling single of 2006, having spent seven weeks in the UK top five and 18 weeks in the top 75. The single had previously been released as a free download on the iTunes music store, where it became the most downloaded single of the week to date. In France, where the song reached number 17, it was used as the soundtrack of the TV series Les Bleus.

== Music video ==
The first two music videos which helped to put Orson onto the map were both directed by Tony Petrossian. The video for "No Tomorrow" uses a spotlight device to show only bits and snippets of the singer's night out with a girl. It features the attention focused on a circular light that moves around the screen and allows you to see through; the rest of the picture is darker than what's shown in the light and sometimes goes all black. The video for "Bright Idea" features a device that originated with Picasso when he took his still image labeled "Menotaur." In the Tony Petrossian-helmed music video, the streaking light effect comes to life and real time.

== Track listings ==
UK 7-inch single and European CD single

1. "No Tomorrow" – 2:51 (2:48 on European single)
2. "The Okay Song" – 3:53

UK and Australian CD single

1. "No Tomorrow" – 2:48
2. "Everything" – 3:39
3. "Jessie" – 3:37
4. "No Tomorrow" (video) – 2:48

== Charts ==
=== Weekly charts ===
Chart (2006)	Peak position
Austria (Ö3 Austria Top 40)	21
Europe (Eurochart Hot 100)	5
France (SNEP)	17
Germany (GfK)	65
Ireland (IRMA)	26
Netherlands (Single Top 100)	100
New Zealand (Recorded Music NZ)	40
Scottish Singles Sales (Official Charts)	5
Switzerland (Schweizer Hitparade)	24
UK Singles (Official Charts)	1

=== Year-end charts ===
Chart (2006)	Position
Europe (Eurochart Hot 100)	65
UK Singles (OCC)	12

== Certifications ==
Region	Certification	Certified units/sales
United Kingdom (BPI)	Gold	400,000^{‡}
^{‡} Sales+streaming figures based on certification alone.
