= GPS (band) =

British band (2006–2008)

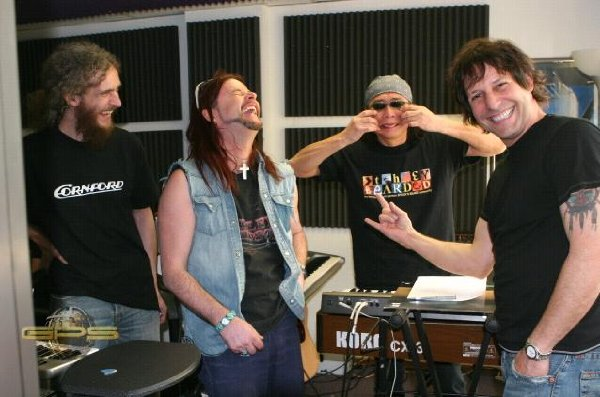
- GPS in 2006. L-R: Guthrie Govan, John Payne, Ryo Okumoto, and Jay Schellen.

Background information
- Origin: England
- Genres: Rock, Progressive rock
- Years active: 2006–2008
- Labels: InsideOut Music; Dingwall (Japan)
- Members: John Payne; Guthrie Govan; Jay Schellen; Ryo Okumoto

GPS were a progressive rock group formed in 2006 by John Payne (vocals, bass, guitar), Guthrie Govan (guitars) and Jay Schellen (drums, percussion). These three had been working together in Asia, specifically on an album to have been called Architect of Time, when the fourth member of Asia, Geoff Downes, joined a reunion of the band's classic line-up, dissolving the then current line-up. Payne, Govan and Schellen announced the formation of a new band in February 2006 to be called One. However, after discovering another rock act with the same name, the band changed its name to GPS, from the initials of the three founders.

== Biography ==
The band released a 10-track album called Window to the Soul on InsideOut in August 2006 in Europe; the release in North America came the following September. The album had originally been announced as One with a May release date. All the tracks are credited to Payne/Schellen/Govan, and keyboards on the album and subsequent tour were played by Ryo Okumoto of Spock's Beard. The band performed live in September/October 2006 and on two Japanese dates in late 2007.

In parallel with GPS, Payne, Govan and Schellen were joined by Erik Norlander on keys in Asia Featuring John Payne. Norlander also filled in for Okumoto for one GPS date in the US. Govan later left Asia Featuring John Payne. Norlander also subsequently left Asia Featuring John Payne, to be replaced by Okumoto.

== Window to the Soul ==
Window to the Soul cover

1. "Window to the Soul"
2. "New Jerusalem"
3. "Heaven Can Wait"
4. "Written on the Wind"
5. "I Believe in Yesterday"
6. "The Objector"
7. "All My Life"
8. "Gold"
9. "Since You've Been Gone"
10. "Taken Dreams"
11. "In His Eyes" (Govan) +
12. "The Haunting" (Payne) +

All songs by Govan, Payne, and Schellen unless indicated.

+ On Japanese and South Korean release only

About half of the material on Window to the Soul was originally written for Architect of Time. A November 2005 press release from Asia had mentioned "Written on the Wind", "I Believe in Yesterday" and "Since You've Been Gone" as song titles for the Asia album (to have been called Architect of Time) Payne, Govan and Schellen were recording with Downes before the split. The album cover features record executive John Kalodner in front of a television.
