= Andy Nye =

English musician and songwriter

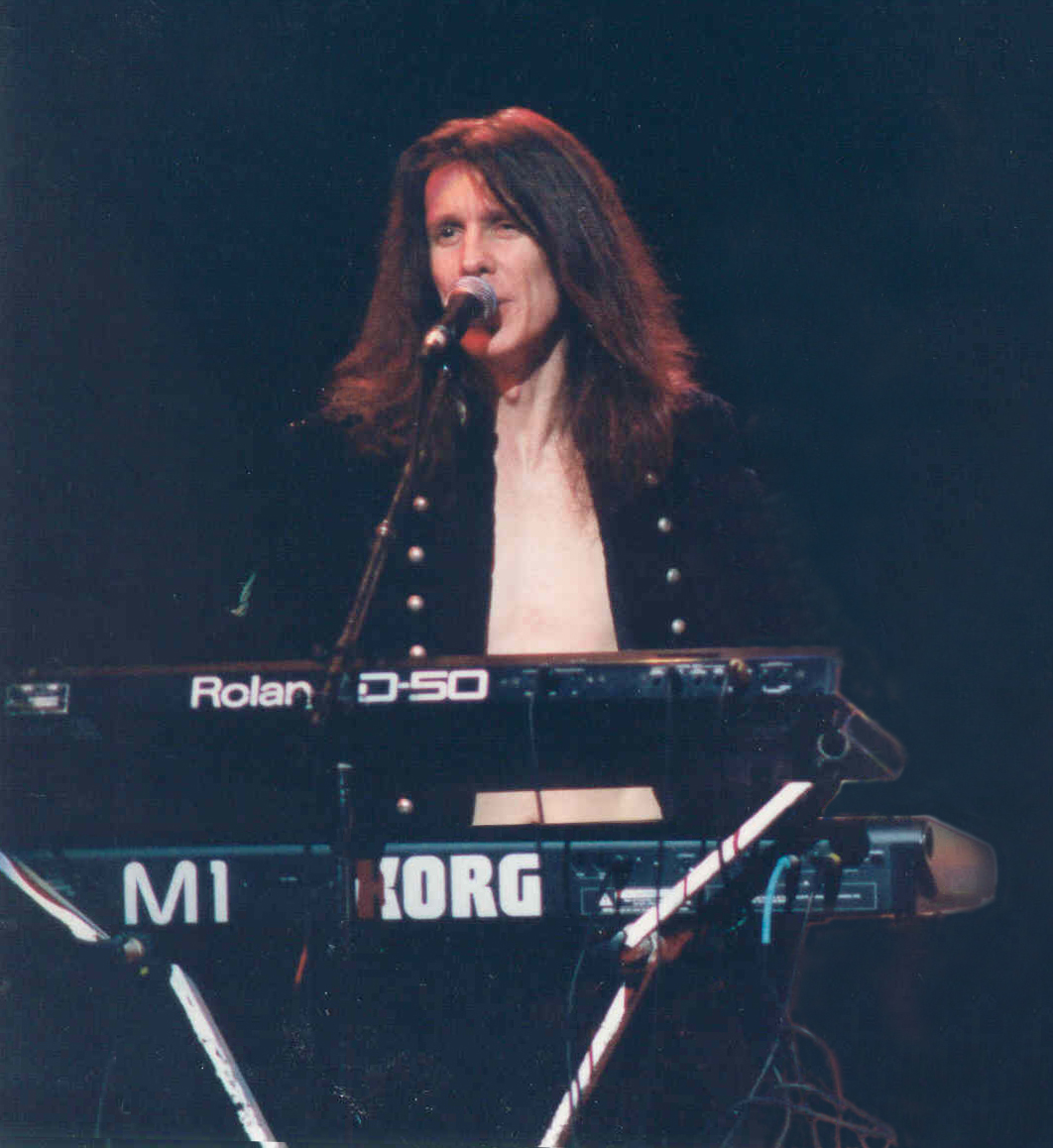
Nye onstage in 1994

Andy Dane Nye (born 8 April 1959 in London, England) is an English musician, songwriter, author, producer and agent. He was a member of the rock band The Michael Schenker Group at their peak in the 1980s and has also played keyboards for Sheena Easton, Toyah Willcox, Barbara Dickson, Chris Farlowe, Gerard Kenny, Dennis Waterman, Princess Stephanie of Monaco, Jahn Teigen, The Kick, After Hours and Mainland. His songs have been recorded by artists such as Roger Daltrey, Asia, The Michael Schenker Group, Ten Years After, Chris Farlowe, John Entwistle, Colin Blunstone and The Zombies. Books from his Master Trilogy are Amazon best sellers.

== Biography ==
Andy Nye was trained in classical piano from the age of eight, attending the Watford School of Music as a teenager and performing his first paid gig at the age of 14, playing the clarinet and alto saxophone in his grandfather's danceband.

On leaving school in 1977, he joined Mainland, a band managed by Deep Purple's former co-manager Rob Cooksey, leading to his first studio experience under the auspices of Deep Purple producer Martin Birch.

After an 81-date tour with Leo Sayer in 1979, culminating in five nights at The Hammersmith Odeon, the band disintegrated and Nye was requisitioned to play keyboards with rising star Sheena Easton on her 1980 debut world tour, accompanying her live in the U.S. on Tonight Show Starring Johnny Carson on three separate occasions.

In 1981, Nye switched to touring with British singer Barbara Dickson, recording the live Here We Go album in the process.

In 1982, he was approached by Rob Cooksey and asked to perform on a session basis with the Michael Schenker Group (MSG) whom Cooksey was managing at that time. He was inducted as a permanent member after they headlined the Reading Festival in the summer of that year.

In 1984, whilst headlining the Rock in Japan series of festivals, which included Whitesnake, The Scorpions and Bon Jovi on the same bill, Nye was approached by David Coverdale and asked to perform with Whitesnake, after the departure of keyboardist Jon Lord. He refused when discovering he'd be required to perform offstage. After a period of volatility within MSG, Schenker eventually disbanded the group later that year. Nye, who had previously signed a publishing deal with The Who's management company, Trinifold, joined forces with the Who's bass guitarist John Entwistle on a project called The Rock, with Barriemore Barlow (Jethro Tull) on drums, later to be replaced by Zak Starkey (the Who, Oasis).

In 1986, Nye began writing and recording with Leo Lyons (Ten Years After) as The Kick, resulting in the release of the album Heartland.

At the same time, he had started a writing partnership with John Payne, working on songs for the upcoming ELO Part II project, Payne having been chosen to replace Jeff Lynne as vocalist. But Payne departed the project before recording began and he and Nye went on to form the Passion as a vehicle for their songs, enlisting the services of drummer Clive Burr (Iron Maiden), bass guitarist Mel Gabbitas and ex-Mike Oldfield guitarist Ant Glynne.

Payne was asked to join Asia in 1991, whilst Nye had been writing and producing material for the Zombies' Colin Blunstone, a move which resulted in many of the duo's songs being subsequently recorded by Asia on various albums.

Nye wrote, performed and recorded with After Hours before returning to his original position of hired hand and touring the world with Toyah Willcox, Princess Stephanie of Monaco and various other artists.

In 1995, he set up his own music agency, becoming Wishbone Ash's UK agent in 2000, a position he holds to the present.

In 1997, he formed PLATINUM – The Live ABBA Tribute Show, which has gone on to perform around the world to critical acclaim, with Nye undertaking the role of Benny Andersson.

In 2009, Voiceprint released an album of the remaining Nye/Payne material entitled The Passion.

In 2015, Nye's contribution as an agent to keeping Wishbone Ash a viable performing entity after more than forty years was acknowledged by founding member Andy Powell in his autobiography Eyes Wide Open.

December 2019 saw the publication of Nye's debut novel, Master Piece, a work of humorous, speculative fiction. Described in reviews as "Douglas Adams crossed with Terry Pratchett with a bit of Dan Brown action", it became an Amazon #1 Best Seller in 2020 and was followed in 2021 by the release of his second book, Master Plan, which also acquired that status.

Having collaborated on many projects with Chris White, in 2024 he was asked to write the introduction for the liner notes of The Chris White Experience - Volume Five, part of a series of albums released after White’s induction into the Rock & Roll Hall of Fame in 2019. White is Nye’s maternal uncle.

Master Mind, the final book in his Master Trilogy, was published in September 2024.

== Discography ==
- Mainland - "Who Do You Love" (1978, Single)
- Mainland - "By Your Side" (1979, Single)
- Mainland - "No Money" (1979, Single)
- Mainland - Exposure (1979)
- Dave Prowse and Tony Blackburn - "Green Cross Code" (1980)
- Joanna and the Queens - “Successful” (1981, Single)
- Yvonne & Norman Champion - "You and I" (1982)
- Lorraine - "Lorraine" (1982)
- Les Payne - "Who Will Be The Winner" (1982, Single)
- Dune - "Dancin Heatwave" (1982, Single)
- Loose Talk - "Dan Dare" (1982, Single)
- Barbara Dickson - Here We Go (1982, Live)
- Michael Schenker Group - BBC Radio One Live in Concert (1982, Live)
- Michael Schenker Group - Reading Rock - Volume One (1982, Live)
- Michael Schenker Group - Built to Destroy (1983)
- Michael Schenker Group - Rock Will Never Die (1984, Live)
- Roger Daltrey - "Under a Raging Moon" (1985) Writing Credit
- Roger Daltrey - "After The Fire" (1985, Single) B-Side Writing Credit
- Roger Daltrey - "Quicksilver Lightning" (1986, USA Single) B-Side Writing Credit
- Michael Schenker - Portfolio (1987)
- The Kick - Heartland (1988)
- Chris Farlowe - Waiting in the Wings (1988)
- Ten Years After - About Time (1989) Writing Credit
- After Hours - After Hours (1989)
- Ronny's Pop Show 15 - CBS (1990) Writing Credit
- MSG - The Collection (1991, Compilation)
- The Zombies - New World (1991) Writing Credits
- The Kick - This Can't Be Love (1992, Single)
- MSG - The Essential Michael Schenker Group (1992, Compilation)
- Asia - Aqua (1992) Writing Credit
- Asia - Aria (1992) Writing Credits
- Michael Schenker - Anthology (1993)
- Jahn Teigen - Rondo (1993)
- Michael Schenker Group - BBC Radio One Live In Concert (1993)
- Mike Fab Gere & The Permissive Society - "I Am The Walrus" (1993, Single)
- Mike Fab Gere & The Permissive Society - "Summer of Love" (1994, Single)
- Michael Schenker Group - Armed & Ready. The Best of the Michael Schenker Group (1994)
- Chris Farlowe - "Out of Time" (1994)
- Chris Thompson - Blinded by the Light (1994, Single)
- Toyah - Looking Back (1995)
- Asia - Archiva 1 (1996)
- Asia - Archiva 2 (1996)
- Leo Lyons' Kick - Tough Trip Through Paradise (1996)
- Michael Schenker Group - "Assault Attack / Rock Will Never Die" (1996)
- Colin Blunstone - The Light Inside (1998) Writing Credits
- Asia – Axioms (1999) Writing Credits
- Michael Schenker - Into The Arena 1972–1995 (2000, Compilation)
- Michael Schenker Group - "Back to Attack Live" (2003)
- Gary Barden - Past and Present (2004) Writing Credit
- Ten Years After - Roadworks (2005) Writing Credit
- John Entwistle - The Rock (2006)
- Michael Schenker Group - The Best of the Michael Schenker Group 1980–1984 (2008)
- Asia - Best of Asia (2008)
- Chris Thompson - Backtrack 1980-1994 (2008)
- Michael Schenker Group - Walk The Stage - The Official Bootleg Box (2009)
- John Payne & Andy Nye - The Passion (2009)
- Michael Schenker Group - Walk The Stage - The Highlights (2013)
- Chris Thompson - Jukebox (The Ultimate Collection) (2015)
- Michael Schenker’s Temple of Rock – "On a Mission – Live in Madrid" (2016) Writing Credit
- The Chris White Experience - Volume One (2019)
- The Chris White Experience - Volume Two (2019)
- The Chris White Experience - Volume Three (2020)
- The Chris White Experience - Volume Four (2020)
- Leo Lyons’ Hundred Seventy Split - "Movin’ On" (2024) Writing Credit
- The Chris White Experience - The Best Of (2024) Writing Credit
- Michael Schenker Group - "Is It Loud Enough?" (2024)
- The Chris White Experience - Volume Seven (2025)

== Bibliography ==
- Master Piece - The Master Trilogy, Book 1 (2019)
- Master Plan - The Master Trilogy, Book 2 (2021)
- Master Mind - The Master Trilogy, Book 3 (2024)
