= Chad Smith's Bombastic Meatbats =

American instrumental rock band

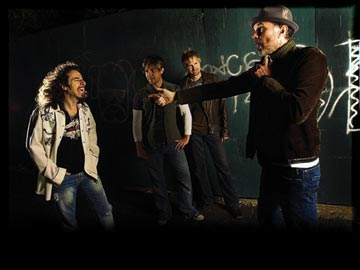
- Chad Smith's Bombastic Meatbats in 2009

Background information
- Origin: Los Angeles, California, U.S.
- Genres: Funk rock; jazz-funk
- Years active: 2007–present
- Labels: Warrior Records/UMD
- Members: Jeff Kollman; Ed Roth; Chad Smith
- Past members: Kevin Chown

Chad Smith's Bombastic Meatbats is an American instrumental funk rock band from Los Angeles. It consists of Red Hot Chili Peppers' drummer Chad Smith, guitarist Jeff Kollman (from Cosmosquad), bassist Kevin Chown (Uncle Kracker, Tarja Turunen), and keyboardist Ed Roth (Ronnie Montrose, Gamma).

The group formed accidentally in 2007 with Kollman, Roth, and Smith being the backup band for Glenn Hughes. The trio would do impromptu instrumental jams while warming up for Hughes' sessions and they decided to form a group adding bassist, Kevin Chown in 2008.

Being based in Los Angeles, Bombastic Meatbats regularly perform at Don Randi's jazz club, the Baked Potato. Depending upon Chad Smith's touring schedule, the Bombastic Meatbats have dubbed both Kenny Aronoff and Matt Sorum honorary Meatbats, as they have subbed for Smith at various shows on the drums.

In May 2010, Bombastic Meatbats performed on the 40th Anniversary Baked Potato Jazz Festival at John Anson Ford Amphitheater in Hollywood, California. Their second CD, More Meat, was released on October 19, 2010. The band's first live album, Live Meat And Potatoes was released on May 21, 2012.

== Discography ==
- Meet the Meatbats (September 15, 2009)
- More Meat (October 19, 2010)
- Live Meat And Potatoes (May 21, 2012)
