= John Payne (singer) =

British singer (born 1958)

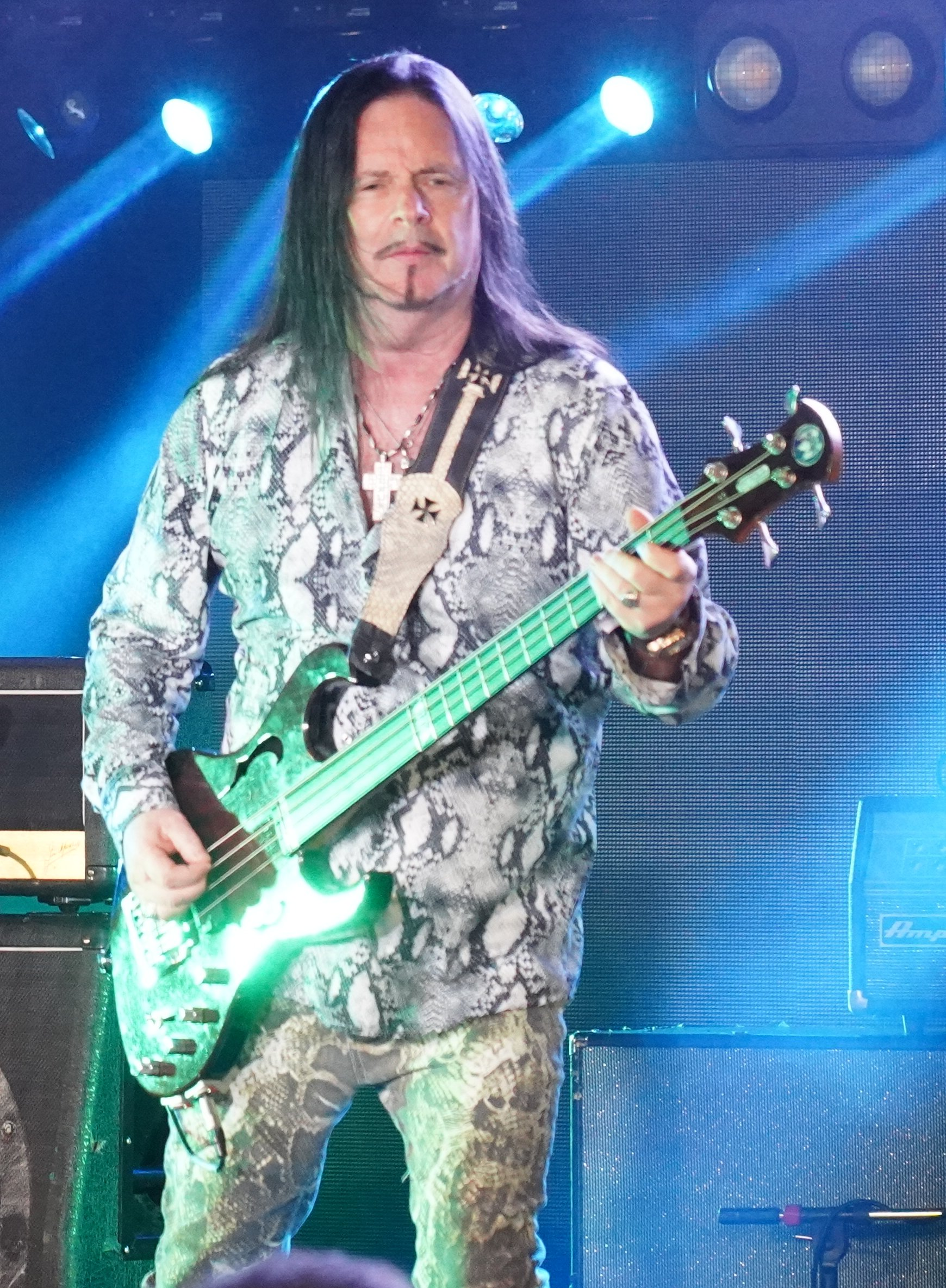
- Payne in 2025

Background information
- Born: John Timothy Payne; 29 September 1958 (age 67); Luton, England
- Genres: Hard rock; progressive rock; pop rock; AOR
- Occupations: Musician; songwriter
- Instruments: Vocals; bass guitar
- Years active: 1980–present
- Member of: Asia Featuring John Payne; GPS; Dukes of the Orient
- Formerly of: Asia

John Timothy Payne (born 29 September 1958) is an English musician who was the lead singer and bassist of the rock band Asia from 1991 to 2006 before subsequently spinning off into Asia featuring John Payne. Additionally, he is a member of Dukes of the Orient, The Rock Pack, and formerly GPS.

John Payne became the frontman of Asia in 1991 at the invitation of founder member Geoff Downes, replacing vocalist/bassist John Wetton. During Payne's tenure, Asia released eight studio albums, several live albums and toured internationally. Apart from his vocal and bass duties, he is a guitarist, photographer, composer, recording engineer and record producer. He was also a co-creator and formerly part of the Las Vegas production Raiding the Rock Vault at the Las Vegas Hotel.

== Biography ==
Payne's first band were called Moonstone. They toured the UK in the late seventies, opening for well-known groups such as Argent.

In 1986, he recorded a silver selling record with the band CCCP in Scandinavia. CCCP was a group that featured John on lead vocals with Johnny Cash's stepdaughter Carlene Carter sharing vocal duties.

He provided backing vocals on several solo albums by Roger Daltrey, including Under a Raging Moon (1985) and Can't Wait to See the Movie (1987).

Back in England, he and keyboardist Andy Nye (from the Michael Schenker Group) formed The Passion, enlisting the services of drummer Clive Burr (Iron Maiden), bassist Mel Gabbitas and the ex-Mike Oldfield guitarist Ant Glynne.

Payne was considered for a position in ELO Part II on guitar and vocals. For a year prior to joining Asia in 1991, he was chosen to replace Jeff Lynne as the lead vocalist in ELO, later to be named ELO Part II, but left because of protracted negotiations over the name.

=== Asia ===
After the departure of John Wetton, Geoff Downes invited Payne to join the band as lead singer, bassist, co-writer and co-producer. Payne and Geoff Downes continued together as Asia for 15 years, with several line-ups around them, until they stuck with Guthrie Govan (guitar) and Chris Slade (drums) in 1999. This line-up persisted through 2005, when Slade departed to be replaced by Jay Schellen.

=== Asia featuring John Payne ===
In 2009, Govan was replaced by Mitch Perry and North American touring has continued through 2010. Work began on a studio album, originally called Architect of Time, but this would eventually be released under the new band name of Dukes of the Orient. A live album Extended Versions by Asia featuring John Payne, was released in fall 2007, drawn from a December 2005 live show in Sweden with Downes, Schellen, Payne and Govan.

An EP entitled Military Man was released with re-recordings of Payne-era Asia tracks: "Military Man" and "Long Way from Home", plus an Erik Norlander solo composition, "Neurosaur". Tracks were performed by Govan, Payne, Norlander and Schellen.

In 2014, a CD entitled Recollections was released, a cover album of UK progressive rock songs. As well as producer, vocalist and bassist, Payne played most of the keyboards and some guitars. He was joined by Moni Scaria, Jeff Kollman and Jay Schellen. The video for the first single "Eye in the Sky" was shot in Vegas and includes an appearance from Alan Parsons.

=== Dukes of the Orient ===
Around 2017, Payne and Norlander reunited to form the group Dukes of the Orient as a new band name for the material that had been 10 years in the making as an Asia Featuring John Payne project. Their self-titled debut was released in February 2018 via Frontier Records, featuring Scaria and Kollman on guitars from Asia Featuring John Payne, plus former members Bouillet, Govan (guitar) and Schellen (drums). The album features the former single, "Seasons Will Change," originally released by Asia Featuring John Payne in 2012. Following the death of singer John Wetton and for clarity with the Downes-led Asia, Payne and Norlander decided these recordings should be as a new band. Their second album, Freakshow, was released on 7 August 2020.

=== TV, film and stage ===
In 2007, Payne played the part of Parson Nathaniel in the touring production of Jeff Wayne's Musical Version of The War of the Worlds. In 2016, Payne began composition of original work for Steve Gustafson. This work is in support to Gustafson's creation, via his Experience Based Learning zipline business, of an independent Reality TV show surrounding the zip line adventure tourism market entitled Zip Away!

=== The Rock Pack ===
In January 2014, Payne created the touring show "The Rock Pack". In this show Payne interviews iconic rock singers from major classic rock bands and performs their hits with them. It included vocalists past and present from such bands as Foreigner, Cheap Trick, Journey, Santana, Toto, Kansas and The Tubes.

== Discography ==
=== Asia ===
==== Studio albums ====
- Aqua (1992)
- Aria (1994)
- Arena (1996)
- Archiva 1 (1996)
- Archiva 2 (1996)
- Rare (1999)
- Aura (2000)
- Silent Nation (2004)

==== Live albums ====
- Live at the Town & Country
- Live Acoustic
- Live in Philadelphia
- Live in Osaka
- Live in Köln
- America: Live in the USA

==== Live DVD ====
- "America: Live in the USA" (2003)

=== Asia featuring John Payne ===
==== Live albums ====
- Extended Versions, also released as Scandinavia (2007)

==== Studio albums ====
- Military Man (EP) (2009)
- Recollections: A Tribute to British Prog (2014)

=== Dukes of the Orient ===
- Dukes of the Orient (2018)
- Freakshow (2020)

=== Roger Daltrey ===
- Under a Raging Moon (1985)
- Can't Wait to See the Movie (1987)
- Martyrs & Madmen (1997)
- Just a Boy
- Gold

=== Intelligent Music Project III ===
- Touching The Divine (2015)

=== Intelligent Music Project IV ===
- Sorcery Inside (2019)

=== Intelligent Music Project V ===
- Life Motion (2020)

=== Intelligent Music Project VI ===
- The Creation (2021)

=== John Payne ===
- "Fly Away" b/w "Coming Home" 45 RPM single, Arrival Records (1984)
- "Gonna Give Her All the Love I've Got" (1984)
- "Ride the Storm" (American Way film soundtrack, film also titled Riders of the Storm in some countries), released as a single b/w "Take the Money" (1987)
- Different Worlds cd compilation of solo work and work with ASIA and GPS, Voiceprint (2007)
- "Decoding the Lost Symbol" part of the Architects of Time project, CD EP (2009)

=== GPS ===
- Window to The Soul (2006)
- Two Seasons: Live in Japan, Volume 1 Live release (2012)
- Two Seasons: Live in Japan, Volume 2 Live release (2012)

=== The Passion (with Andy Nye) ===
- The Passion Voiceprint (2007)

=== Geoff Downes NDO ===
- Vox Humana (1993)
- World Service (1999)

=== CCCP ===
- Let's spend the Night Together (1986, reissued on cd 2007)

=== Lunatica ===
- Edge of Infinity (2006)
- Farewell My Love (2009)

=== Lisa LaRue ===
- Transformation 2012 (2009)
- World Class (2009)
- Fast and Blue (2011)

=== Other collaborations ===
- "That's When The Crying Starts" with the band Stringer, Arrival records (1982)
- "The Secret Affair" with the band Jupiter Red (1983)
- "Baby Won't Phone" with the band Quadrascope (1983)
- Bite The Bullet with the band Bite the Bullet (1989)
- "Dark Horse" with the band That'll Be The Day (2002)
- "Killer on the Loose" with Billy Sherwood, part of the A Tribute to Thin Lizzy project (2008)
- "Beyond the Horizon" with the super-group project Roswell Six from Kevin J. Anderson and ProgRock_Records (2009)
- "Firewolfe" – Debut album (2011). Mixing and mastering.
- "The Mystic Technocracy" and "Loving the Alien" (a David Bowie cover), part of The Mystic Technocracy – Season 1: The Age of Ignorance album by Docker's Guild (2012)
- "Lucky No. 7" – album by Ted Wulfers (2012). Backing Vocals on "Jade In My Pocket" and "Stars."
