= Rocket Scientists =

Rock band from Los Angeles

- Origin: Los Angeles, California, U.S.
- Genres: Progressive rock
- Years active: 1993–present
- Labels: Think Tank Media
- Members: Mark McCrite; Erik Norlander; Don Schiff
- Website: Rocket Scientists official site

Rocket Scientists is a progressive rock band formed in the late 1980s by keyboardist Erik Norlander and vocalist / guitarist Mark McCrite. The band released their first CD, Earthbound, in 1993 joined by session bassist Don Schiff. Schiff quickly became a part of the band for their second release in 1995, Brutal Architecture, and the three toured in the US and Europe in 1997 along with drummer Tommy Amato culminating in the live CD, Earth Below and Sky Above: Live in Europe and America. In 1999, Rocket Scientists released Oblivion Days.

== Members ==
=== Current lineup ===
- Mark McCrite - Vocals, Guitar
- Erik Norlander - Keyboards
- Don Schiff - Bass, NS/Stick

== Discography ==
=== Studio albums ===
- Earthbound (1993)
- Brutal Architecture (1995)
- Oblivion Days (1999)
- Revolution Road (2006)
- Supernatural Highways (Instrumental EP, 2014)
- Refuel (2014)

=== Live albums and compilations ===
- Earth Below and Sky Above: Live in Europe and America (1998)
- Looking Backward (2007)
