= John Fedevich =

American drummer and actor

- Origin: Massillon, Ohio, United States
- Genres: Rock
- Instrument: Drums
- Years active: 1989–present

John Fedevich (born in Massillon, Ohio) is an American drummer and actor known for his role in Almost Famous, and as drummer for Michael Cavanaugh and Asia featuring John Payne.

== Career ==
John Fedevich acted in the movie Almost Famous playing the character of Ed Vallencourt, the Stillwater band drummer. He later starred in Vanilla Sky (2001) and Shopgirl (2005). As a musician, Fedevich is a drummer for Michael Cavanaugh (a Billy Joel tribute artist).

During the 90s, he played drums for The Szuters.

Recently, he has performed with the Asia offshoot band Asia featuring John Payne.

As of 2026, he is performing in the Grand Rapids-based 90's Rock tribute band PROJECT 90.

== Personal life ==
Born and raised in Massillon, Ohio, Fedevich currently lives and works in Grand Rapids, Michigan, with his wife Bridget and their dog Foxy.
