= Arena (Asia album) =

Studio album by Asia
- Released: 11 March 1996
- Recorded: 1995
- Studios: Electric Palace, London
- Genres: Progressive rock; album-oriented rock
- Length: 63:54
- Label: Bullet Proof
- Producers: John Payne; Geoff Downes

Asia chronology
Aria (1994)	Arena (1996)	Archiva 1 (1996)

Professional ratings
Review scores
Source	Rating
AllMusic	3/5 stars

Arena is the sixth studio album by the English rock supergroup Asia, released in March 1996 by Bullet Proof Records. Recorded at Electric Palace Studios in London during 1995, it was produced by vocalist John Payne and keyboard player Geoff Downes. The album was a departure from Asia's usual sound, adopting a more acoustic production style with Latin and Middle Eastern influences.

== Background ==
Asia's previous album, Aria, received little promotion due to low sales figures, leading to dwindling audience turnouts during the 1994 tour. Motivated by this, Geoff Downes and John Payne opted to take the followup in a new, bold direction to salvage things. Steve Howe was contacted to return for recording sessions, but was unable to join due to his obligations with Yes at the time. John Payne, Elliot Randall, and Aziz Ibrahim each shared guitar duties on the album. Through this, a Latin-influenced sound began to emerge during jam sessions, which the band felt was the new direction they'd been looking for. A conscious effort was also made to put longer, more progressive pieces into the music, which emerged in the form of "The Day Before the War" and "U Bring Me Down". In order to meet the album's release deadline, Downes and Payne would sometimes spend 15 hours a day recording and mixing to prevent compromising the finished product.

During the group's Christmas holiday break in 1995, a pipe had burst in the Electric Palace studio, destroying thousands of dollars of equipment. Upon returning in January of 1996, it was discovered that a box of tapes filled with unused material had survived among the wreckage. This led to the release of Archiva 1 and Archiva 2 later that year, the latter of which contained the song "That Season", originally meant for inclusion on Arena.

== Reception ==
Arena received mixed to positive reviews. Music critic Phil VanHelden praised the album, stating "Asia returns true to their traditional form, with an upbeat tempo, heavy synthesizer usage, and catchy vocals. [...] Although I would not consider this as their best release to date, it is extremely close and a very well done CD." Sputnikmusic praised the production and songwriting, but criticized John Payne's vocals and the album's length. Gary Hill of Allmusic believed the album lacked a clear direction, while noting that it dropped the "slick and almost contrived texture" of Asia's previous work.

== Track listing ==
All tracks are written by John Payne and Geoff Downes, except where noted.

No.	Title	Writer(s)	Length
1.	"Into the Arena"	Downes, Payne, Elliott Randall, Hotei Tomoyasu	2:59
2.	"Arena"		5:16
3.	"Heaven"		5:17
4.	"Two Sides of the Moon"		5:22
5.	"The Day Before the War"		9:09
6.	"Never"		5:32
7.	"Falling"		4:58
8.	"Words"		5:19
9.	"U Bring Me Down"	Payne, Downes, Aziz Ibrahim	7:07
10.	"Tell Me Why"		5:14
11.	"Turn It Around"	Downes, Payne, Michael Sturgis	4:29
12.	"Bella Nova"		3:11
Total length:			63:54

1998 Snapper Music bonus track
No.	Title	Length
13.	"That Season"	4:51
Total length:		68:46

2005 Inside Out Music remastered edition bonus tracks
No.	Title	Length
13.	"That Season"	4:51
14.	"Two Sides of the Moon" (acoustic)	4:48
Total length:		73:34

== Personnel ==
=== Asia ===
- Geoff Downes – keyboards; producer
- John Payne – vocals (tracks 2–11), solo guitar (tracks 3, 8, 10), acoustic guitar (track 5), bass (tracks 2–8, 10–11); producer, engineer
- Michael Sturgis – drums (tracks 2–11)

=== Additional Musicians ===
- Aziz Ibrahim – rhythm guitar (tracks 3–6, 8, 10, 11), lead guitar (track 5), acoustic guitar (track 8), guitar (track 9)
- Elliott Randall – acoustic guitar (tracks 1, 3), guitar (tracks 2, 7), lead guitar (tracks 4, 6, 10, 11)
- Hotei Tomoyasu – lead guitar (track 1)
- Luis Jardim – percussion (tracks 1, 2, 4)

=== Technical personnel ===
- John Brough – engineer
- Rodney Matthews – cover artwork
- Roger Dean – Asia logotype
- Brian Burrows – sleeve layout/design

== Charts ==
Chart (1996)	Peak position
Japanese Albums (Oricon)	48
Swiss Albums (Schweizer Hitparade)	50
UK Rock & Metal Albums (Official Charts)	34
