= NS/Stick =

The NS/Stick is an 8 string tapping instrument designed by Emmett Chapman and Ned Steinberger. It incorporates design ideas from both the original Stick and from Ned Steinberger's instruments such as the Stick's tapping fretboard and the Steinberger Bass' knee bar and headless design. The player can position the instrument upright for tapping or lower it to a horizontal position for picking, slapping, or strumming.

Don Schiff is one of the most well known NS/Stick musicians.

== Tunings ==
Standard Bass 4ths
Can be thought of as a six string bass with two additional higher strings.

1. Bb
2. F down a 4th
3. C down a 4th
4. G down a 4th
5. D down a 4th
6. A down a 4th
7. E down a 4th
8. B down a 4th

Guitar Intervals
The string arrangement of a 6-string guitar tuned down a fifth (or baritone guitar tuning), with two lower strings.

1. A
2. E down a 4th
3. C down a major 3rd
4. G down a 4th
5. D down a 4th
6. A down a 4th
7. E down a 4th
8. B down a 4th

Guitar Lower Octave
This tuning puts the E-to-E relationship of a standard guitar, down an octave, in the middle of the 8 strings, with a lower B and a higher A string to round things out.

1. A
2. E down a 4th
3. B down a 4th
4. G down a major 3rd
5. D down a 4th
6. A down a 4th
7. E down a 4th
8. B down a 4th
