= Bright Idea =

Studio album by Orson
- Released: May 29, 2006
- Recorded: 2005 (Hollywood)
- Genres: Pop rock, indie rock
- Length: 42:59
- Label: Mercury (UK)
- Producers: Noah Shain, Orson, Chad Rachild

Orson chronology
Bright Idea (2006)	Culture Vultures (2007)

Professional ratings
Review scores
Source	Rating
AllMusic	link
Drowned in Sound	link
MusicOMH	link
Time Out London	link
Virgin Media	link
Yahoo! Music	link

Bright Idea is the debut studio album of American power pop band Orson. Originally self-released in 2005, it was released commercially on May 29, 2006 in the UK and internationally on June 13, 2006.

The album was recorded for just $5,000 in Hollywood, funded by the band themselves, and produced by Noah Shain. It contains the hit singles "No Tomorrow", the title track, "Happiness" and "Already Over". Bright Idea charted at number one on the official UK Albums Chart on June 4, 2006. The video for the single "Bright Idea" was directed by Tony Petrossian and was released as the follow-up to the UK number-one single "No Tomorrow".

The album was prized with a platinum record in the United Kingdom. About 700,000 copies were sold worldwide.

Guitarist Chad Rachild departed a year after the independent self release of the album. He was replaced by Kevin Roentgen and soon after the band were signed to Mercury Records UK.

== Track listing ==
All lyrics are written by Jason Pebworth; all music is composed by George Astasio, Chris Cano, Johnny Lonely, Pebworth, and Chad Rachild.

Bright Idea track listing
No.	Title	Length
1.	"Bright Idea"	4:13
2.	"No Tomorrow"	2:47
3.	"Happiness"	3:56
4.	"Already Over"	3:52
5.	"Downtown" (UK edition only)	4:23
6.	"Tryin' to Help"	3:04
7.	"So Ahead of Me"	3:34
8.	"Last Night"	4:33
9.	"Look Around"	5:05
10.	"Save the World"	3:40
11.	"The Okay Song"	3:50

== Personnel ==
- George Astasio – guitars
- Chris Cano – drums
- Johnny Lonely – bass
- Jason Pebworth – vocals
- Chad Rachild – guitars
- Kevin Roentgen – guitars

== Charts ==
=== Weekly charts ===
Weekly chart performance for Bright Idea
Chart (2006)	Peak position
Austrian Albums (Ö3 Austria)	51
French Albums (SNEP)	29
German Albums (Offizielle Top 100)	48
Irish Albums (IRMA)	32
Scottish Albums (Official Charts)	1
Swiss Albums (Schweizer Hitparade)	38
UK Albums (Official Charts)	1

=== Year-end charts ===
Year-end chart performance for Bright Idea
Chart (2006)	Position
French Albums (SNEP)	168
UK Albums (OCC)	59

== Release history ==
Release history for Bright Idea
Region	Date
United Kingdom	May 29, 2006
Various	June 13, 2006
