= Aria (Asia album) =

Studio album by Asia
- Released: 13 June 1994
- Recorded: November 1993 – March 1994
- Studios: Parkgate, Battle, Sussex; Maison Rouge, London
- Genres: Rock opera; AOR; progressive rock; hard rock
- Length: 48:14
- Label: Bullet Proof
- Producers: Geoff Downes; John Payne

Asia chronology
Aqua (1992)	Aria (1994)	Arena (1996)

Singles from Aria
- 1. "Anytime" Released: 1994

Professional ratings
Review scores
Source	Rating
AllMusic	3/5 stars

Aria is the fifth studio album by English rock supergroup Asia, released in June 1994 in the United Kingdom by Bullet Proof Records and in 1995 in the United States by Mayhem Recordings. Unlike its predecessor, which was recorded with the help of several guest musicians, Aria features a stable line-up consisting of vocalist and bassist John Payne, keyboard player Geoff Downes, guitarist Al Pitrelli and drummer Michael Sturgis.

== Track listing ==
All tracks are written by Geoff Downes and John Payne, except "Desire" and "Aria" written by Payne, Andy Nye and Downes.

No.	Title	Length
1.	"Anytime"	4:57
2.	"Are You Big Enough?"	4:08
3.	"Desire"	5:20
4.	"Summer"	4:07
5.	"Sad Situation"	3:59
6.	"Don't Cut the Wire (Brother)"	5:20
7.	"Feels Like Love"	4:50
8.	"Remembrance Day"	4:19
9.	"Enough's Enough"	4:37
10.	"Military Man"	4:10
11.	"Aria"	2:27
Total length:		48:14

1998 Snapper Music bonus track
No.	Title	Length
12.	"Reality"	4:27
Total length:		52:42

2005 Inside Out Music remastered edition bonus tracks
No.	Title	Length
12.	"Reality"	4:26
13.	"Military Man" (acoustic)	4:23
14.	"Anytime" (multimedia video)	2:41
Total length:		62:15

== Personnel ==
=== Asia ===
- Geoff Downes – keyboards; producer
- John Payne – lead vocals, backing vocals, bass, guitar; producer
- Al Pitrelli – guitars
- Michael Sturgis – drums

=== Technical personnel ===
- Andy Reilly – engineer, mixing engineer (at Les Ballons Du Chien Studios, Oxfordshire)
- Gary Stevenson – mixing engineer
- Roger Dean – cover design, painting, logotypes
- Brian Burrows – sleeve layout/typography
- Paul Rider – photography

== Charts ==
Chart (1994)	Peak position
German Albums (Offizielle Top 100)	89
Japanese Albums (Oricon)	20
Swiss Albums (Schweizer Hitparade)	31
