= Eddie Schwartz =

- Born: Edward Schwartz; December 22, 1949 (age 76)
- Origin: Toronto, Ontario, Canada
- Genres: Rock, pop
- Occupations: Singer, songwriter, guitarist, producer
- Years active: 1977–present

Edward Sydney Schwartz C.M. (born December 22, 1949) is a Canadian musician who had moderate success as a recording artist in the early 1980s before becoming a successful songwriter and record producer in the late 1980s and the 1990s. Songs he has written or co-written include the top-10 Billboard hits "Hit Me With Your Best Shot" (Pat Benatar, 1980), "Don't Shed a Tear" (Paul Carrack, 1987) and "The Doctor" (The Doobie Brothers, 1989).

== Career ==
Schwartz was born in Toronto, Ontario, Canada, and graduated from Toronto's York University in 1976 as a music and English major. He began his musical career soon after playing guitar for Charity Brown's backing band and signed with Infinity Records for a solo contract in 1979. His self-titled debut album, Schwartz, followed in 1980, with A&M Records, as Infinity had gone bankrupt by then, and spawned his first Canadian hit, "Does a Fool Ever Learn".

His next album, No Refuge, came out in 1981, and did well in Canada, as well as the US, placing in the Billboard 200 and spawning a U.S. and Canadian hit single, "All Our Tomorrows," (#28 in the U.S. Billboard Hot 100; #40 Adult Contemporary; Canada #32, Adult Contemporary #23). A follow-up track from this album, "Over the Line" also crept into the Hot 100, peaking at #91. This single would be his last one to crack the U.S. charts to date. At least half of the songs on the No Refuge album have since been covered by other mainstream artists ("Good With Your Love," by Mickey Thomas on his 1981 Alive Alone album; "Tonight," by Amii Stewart on her 1982 I'm Gonna Get Your Love album; "Heart on Fire" by Honeymoon Suite on their 1984 self-titled debut album; and "All Our Tomorrows," by Joe Cocker on his 1987 Unchain My Heart album).

Schwartz's third and last album for a major record label, Public Life, came out two years later and featured another Canadian hit with "Strike." Also included on this album was the original recording of his composition, "Special Girl," which was a minor hit for him and became a bigger hit for the band, America.

Although his earliest hit as a songwriter for other artists was Pat Benatar's 1980 single "Hit Me with Your Best Shot", Schwartz didn't focus significantly on producing and songwriting until the late 1980s. Since then he has produced artists of various genres including The Doobie Brothers, The Pointer Sisters, Paul Carrack, Rita Coolidge, Donna Summer, and Lawrence Gowan, and penned hits for Paul Carrack ("Don't Shed a Tear", "I Live By the Groove"), The Doobie Brothers ("The Doctor"), and Donna Summer ("Fascination"). Additionally, many songs he himself originally recorded/performed have been covered by other artists to great success. Examples include: "All Our Tomorrows" (recorded by Joe Cocker), "Does a Fool Ever Learn" (recorded by Helix), and "Special Girl" (covered by both America & Meat Loaf).

He has won multiple BMI, Juno, and SOCAN awards. In 1995 he released an album, Tour de Schwartz, only in Canada, to generally good reviews.

Schwartz was appointed a Member of the Order of Canada in 2012.

Schwartz has also been active as President of the Board of SOCAN, President and President Emeritus of the Songwriters Association of Canada. In November 2017, he was elected the first North American President of the International Council of Music Creators (CIAM) at the council's 50th year at the CIAM Annual Congress in Tokyo. He is also a board member and former president of Fair Trade Music, the non-profit movement dedicated to an ethical, sustainable and transparent music ecosystem.

== Solo discography ==
=== Albums ===
- Schwartz (1980)
- No Refuge (1981)
- Public Life (1984)
- Tour de Schwartz (1995)

=== Singles ===
Year	Single	Peak chart positions				Album
Year	Single	CAN	CAN AC	US	US AC	Album
1980	"Two Hearts Full of Love"	—	—	—	—	Schwartz
1981	"Does a Fool Ever Learn"	29	—	—	—	Schwartz
1981	"All Our Tomorrows"	32	23	28	40	No Refuge
1981	"No Refuge"	—	—	—	—	No Refuge
1982	"Over the Line"	38	—	91	—	No Refuge
1984	"Strike"	47	—	—	—	Public Life
1984	"Special Girl"	—	20	—	—	Public Life
1984	"Don't Come To Me"	—	—	—	—	Public Life
1995	"Bourbon Street"	46	—	—	—	Tour De Schwartz
1995	"Every Road I Take"	69	23	—	—	Tour De Schwartz
