= Aqua (Asia album) =

Studio album by Asia
- Released: 8 June 1992
- Studios: Advision, Brighton, England
- Genre: Progressive rock
- Length: 60:16
- Label: Musidisc
- Producer: Geoff Downes

Asia chronology
Then & Now (1990)	Aqua (1992)	Aria (1994)

Singles from Aqua
- 1. "Who Will Stop the Rain?" Released: 31 August 1992; 2. "Little Rich Boy" Released: 1993 (Germany)

Professional ratings
Review scores
Source	Rating
AllMusic	3/5 stars

Aqua is the fourth studio album by English rock supergroup Asia, released in 1992. It was the first album with longtime vocalist and bassist John Payne.

== Background ==
In April 1991, original vocalist and bassist John Wetton departed from Asia, discouraged by the group's lack of success in the United States. He was replaced by John Payne, who accepted an invitation from keyboard player Geoff Downes to join the group. This duo would eventually lead Asia through to 2006. Although being in an official capacity, two other co-founders, guitarist Steve Howe and drummer Carl Palmer, were involved sporadically, as Howe returned during the sessions having just left Yes again, and Palmer would leave soon, committing to a reunion of Emerson, Lake & Palmer. The line-up was completed by American guitarist Al Pitrelli, who collaborated with Alice Cooper from 1989 to 1991. Several additional musicians were invited as guests, including drummer Simon Phillips.

== Production ==
Aqua was recorded at Advision Studios in Brighton, England, and produced by Downes. The cover artwork was designed by Rodney Matthews, known for his work with Eloy and Magnum among others, and featured the group's logotype designed by Roger Dean, who had created the covers of all previous studio recordings.

"Love Under Fire" was composed in summer 1988 by Downes and Greg Lake under the project named Ride the Tiger. The album contains four songs co-written by Johnny Warman.

== Release ==
Aqua was released on 8 June 1992 in the United Kingdom by Musidisc and 15 September 1992 in the United States by Great Pyramid Records. The U.S. edition features a modified cover and different track listing, in which "Little Rich Boy" is omitted.

== Track listing ==
European edition
No.	Title	Writer(s)	Length
1.	"Aqua Part 1"	Geoff Downes, John Payne, Steve Howe	2:27
2.	"Who Will Stop the Rain?"	Downes, Johnny Warman, Ben Woolfenden	4:36
3.	"Back in Town"	Downes, Payne	4:10
4.	"Love Under Fire"	Downes, Greg Lake	5:15
5.	"Someday"	Downes, Warman	5:49
6.	"Little Rich Boy"	Downes, Payne	4:38
7.	"The Voice of Reason"	Downes, Payne	5:37
8.	"Lay Down Your Arms"	Downes, Payne, Greg Hart	4:15
9.	"Crime of the Heart"	Downes, Warman	5:58
10.	"A Far Cry"	Downes, Payne, Hart, Bob Mitchell	5:30
11.	"Don't Call Me"	Downes, Warman	4:56
12.	"Heaven on Earth"	Payne, Andy Nye	4:55
13.	"Aqua Part 2"	Downes, Payne	2:11
Total length:			60:16

1998 Snapper Music bonus track
No.	Title	Writer(s)	Length
14.	"Obsession"	Payne, Steve Rodford	4:57
Total length:			65:13

2004 Inside Out Music remastered edition bonus tracks
No.	Title	Writer(s)	Length
14.	"Obsession"	Payne, Rodford	4:59
15.	"Little Rich Boy" (live)	Downes, Payne	7:00
16.	"Love Under Fire" (live)	Downes, Lake	5:55
Total length:			78:12

- Tracks 15 and 16 were recorded on 10 November 1992 at the Town & Country Club in London.

U.S. edition
No.	Title	Writer(s)	Length
1.	"Aqua Part 1"	Downes, Payne, Howe	2:26
2.	"Who Will Stop the Rain?"	Downes, Warman, Woolfenden	4:36
3.	"Lay Down Your Arms"	Downes, Payne, Hart	4:15
4.	"Heaven on Earth"	Payne, Nye	4:54
5.	"Someday"	Downes, Warman	5:49
6.	"Crime of the Heart"	Downes, Warman	5:57
7.	"A Far Cry"	Downes, Payne, Hart, Mitchell	5:30
8.	"Back in Town"	Downes, Payne	4:09
9.	"Don't Call Me"	Downes, Warman	4:56
10.	"Love Under Fire"	Downes, Lake	5:15
11.	"The Voice of Reason"	Downes, Payne	5:36
12.	"Aqua Part 2"	Downes, Payne	2:10
Total length:			55:36

== Personnel ==
=== Asia ===
- Geoff Downes – keyboards, backing vocals; producer
- Steve Howe – acoustic and electric guitars, pedal steel guitar, Dobro guitar, mandolin
- Al Pitrelli – lead and rhythm guitars
- John Payne – bass guitar, guitar, lead vocals, backing vocals
- Carl Palmer – drums, percussion

=== Additional musicians ===
- Anthony Glynne – guitar
- Simon Phillips – drums
- Nigel Glockler – drums

=== Technical personnel ===
- Pete Craigie – engineer
- John Brand – mixing engineer
- Rodney Matthews – sleeve illustration
- Roger Dean – Asia logotype
- Brian Burrows – sleeve design/typography (European edition)
- Hugh Syme – design (U.S. edition)

== Charts ==
Chart (1992)	Peak position
German Albums (Offizielle Top 100)	51
Japanese Albums (Oricon)	21
Swiss Albums (Schweizer Hitparade)	20
