= Lana Lane =

American musician

Background information
- Born: Lana Lane
- Origin: Santa Rosa, California
- Genres: Symphonic rock, progressive metal
- Occupation: Singer
- Instruments: Vocals, guitar, piano
- Years active: 1993–present
- Labels: Think Tank Media (US), Avalon (Japan)

Lana Lane is an American rock singer. She sings lead in her eponymous band, and has sung backing vocals for the band Rocket Scientists and guest sung on Ayreon and Erik Norlander albums.

She is married to music producer Erik Norlander, who co-produces her albums with her at their own studio, Think Tank Media in Placerville, California.

Her first album Love is an Illusion was released in 1995 and obtained a fair amount of success in Japan, as did Curious Goods – her second album, from 1996.

Lady Macbeth is a collection of songs based on William Shakespeare's tragedy Macbeth, from Lady MacBeth's point of view.

Lane appeared as a guest vocalist on two Ayreon CDs, Universal Migrator Part 1: The Dream Sequencer and Universal Migrator Part 2: Flight of the Migrator, singing lead and harmony vocals. She also provided the computer voice for both albums.

In 2003, Lane sang the part of Queen Guinevere on the concept album Once and Future King Part I by Gary Hughes.

In 2007, Lane released "Red Planet Boulevard", her 9th studio album. It was recorded in the Netherlands and San Francisco, California.

In 2009, Lane sang the primary vocals on Terra Incognita, an album composed by husband Erik Norlander in collaboration with science-fiction writer and lyricist Kevin J. Anderson.

In 2009, Lane also sang on another concept album composed by cousin Davy Vain based on a novel by German science-fiction writer Wolfgang Hohlbein, for the CD Blaze and Ashes by Delany.

In 2012, Lane released "El Dorado Hotel" after a five-year hiatus due, in part, to the death of her father.

== Discography ==
=== Solo ===
- Love Is an Illusion (1995)
- Curious Goods (1996)
- Garden of the Moon (1998)
- Echoes from the Garden (1998) Japan only
- Live in Japan (1998) Japan only
- Ballad Collection (1998) Japan only
- Queen of the Ocean (1999)
- Echoes from the Ocean (1998) Japan only
- Best of Lana Lane 1995 – 1999 (1999) Japan only
- Secrets of Astrology (2000)
- Ballad Collection II (2000) Japan only
- Ballad Collection – Special Edition (2000)
- Project Shangri-La (2002)
- Covers Collection (2003)
- Winter Sessions (2003)
- Return to Japan (2004)
- Storybook: Tales from Europe and Japan (DVD, 2004)
- Lady Macbeth (2005)
- 10th Anniversary Concert (DVD/CD set, 2006)
- Gemini (2006)
- Red Planet Boulevard (2007)
- Best of Lana Lane 2000 – 2008 (2008) Japan only
- El Dorado Hotel (2012)
- Neptune Blue (2022)

=== Erik Norlander ===
- Surreal (2016)
- The Galactic Collective: Live in Gettysburg (2012)
- The Galactic Collective (2010)
- Looking Backward (2007)
- Live in St. Petersburg (2006)
- Stars Rain Down: Live In Europe 2001-2003 (2004)
- Into the Sunset (2000)

=== Rocket Scientists ===
- Looking Backward (2015)
- Refuel (2014)
- Supernatural Highways (2014)
- Oblivion Days (1999)
- Live In Bruchsal, Germany 21 September 1997 (1998)
- Earth Below and Sky Above (1998)
- Brutal Architecture (1995)
- Earthbound (1993)

=== Delany ===
- Blaze And Ashes (2009)

=== Roswell Six ===
- Terra Incognita: Beyond the Horizon (2009)

=== Helloïse ===
- Fata Morgana (2001)

=== Ayreon ===
- Universal Migrator Part 1: The Dream Sequencer (2000)
- Universal Migrator Part 2: Flight of the Migrator (2000)
- Temple of the Cat [EP] (2000)
- Ayreonauts Only (2000)

=== Ambeon ===
- Fate of a Dreamer (2002)

=== Genius ===
- Episode 1: A Human into Dreams' World (2002)

=== Tribute albums ===
- A Return to Fantasy: A Tribute to Uriah Heep (2003)

=== Aemen ===
- Fooly Dressed (2003)

=== Gary Hughes ===
- The Once and Future King [Part I and II] (2003)
