= Then & Now (Asia album) =

1990 compilation album

Compilation album by Asia
- Released: 13 August 1990
- Recorded: 1981–1985 (tracks 1–5, 8 and 10), 1989–1990 (tracks 6, 7 and 9)
- Genre: Progressive rock
- Length: 42:29
- Label: Geffen
- Producers: Mike Stone; Frank Wolf; John Wetton; Sue Shifrin; David Cassidy; Guy Roche; Geoff Downes

Asia chronology
Aurora (1986)	Then & Now (1990)	Aqua (1992)

Singles from Then & Now
- 1. "Days Like These" Released: 17 August 1990

Then & Now is a compilation album by English rock supergroup Asia, released on 13 August 1990 by Geffen Records. It consists of two parts titled as Then and Now. Then comprises songs from the band's first two albums, Asia and Alpha, which featured the band's original line-up of Geoff Downes, Steve Howe, Carl Palmer, and John Wetton. Now comprises songs recorded by the band after Howe's departure (including "Voice of America" from the band's third album, Astra).

== Reception ==
Professional ratings
Review scores
Source	Rating
AllMusic	1.5/5 stars
Entertainment Weekly	C
Select	1/5 medals

Then & Now has received negative reception from music critics. Greg Sandow in his review for Entertainment Weekly gave the album a rating of C. He wrote that the old hits such as "Heat of the Moment" and "Don't Cry" "are empty symphonic rock, full of strings and predictable melodic hooks", while the new songs "aren’t as lush", "hit the beat a little harder, but in essence [they’re] just as bland". Tom Demalon has given the compilation a retrospective rating of one-and-a-half stars out of five on AllMusic. He has noted that Asia were not able to repeat their early success with the new material, which has been described as "flaccid musically and insipid lyrically". "Days Like These", written by Steve Jones (the past leader for The Unforgiven), has been singled out as an exception, "which nearly matches the band's strong debut material".

The album only peaked at number 114 on the Billboard 200 and did not reach UK Albums Chart at all. However, it sold steadily over years and was certified gold on 23 July 1998 for over half a million copies shipped in the United States, where it remains the group's third best selling album, trailing Asia and Alpha. To promote Then & Now, "Days Like These" was released as a single. The song gained substantial airplay during the summer of 1990 and was a number two hit on the Mainstream Rock chart. Despite this, the single stalled at number 64 on the Billboard Hot 100 and has been the last to date chart entry for Asia in the United States.

== Track listing ==
All tracks are written by John Wetton and Geoff Downes, except where noted.

Side one: Then
No.	Title	Writer(s)	Length
1.	"Only Time Will Tell"		4:46
2.	"Heat of the Moment"		3:52
3.	"Wildest Dreams"		5:10
4.	"Don't Cry"		3:40
5.	"The Smile Has Left Your Eyes"	Wetton	3:14

Side two: Now
No.	Title	Writer(s)	Length
6.	"Days Like These"	Steve Jones	4:05
7.	"Prayin' 4 a Miracle"	Wetton, Sue Shifrin, David Cassidy	4:22
8.	"Am I in Love?"		4:24
9.	"Summer (Can't Last Too Long)"		4:16
10.	"Voice of America"		4:18
Total length:			42:29

== Personnel ==
=== Asia ===
- Geoff Downes – keyboards; producer (tracks 9, 10)
- John Wetton – lead vocals, backing vocals, bass; producer (tracks 7, 9)
- Steve Howe – guitar (tracks 1–5)
- Mandy Meyer – guitar (tracks 8, 10)
- Carl Palmer – drums, percussion

=== Guest musicians ===
- Steve Lukather – guitar (track 6)
- Ron Komie – guitar (track 7)
- Scott Gorham – guitar (track 9)
- Michael Sturgis - drums (track 9)

=== Technical personnel ===
- Mike Stone – producer (tracks 1–5, 8, 10), engineer (tracks 1–5, 8), mixing engineer (tracks 9, 10)
- Paul Northfield – engineer (tracks 4, 5)
- Frank Wolf – producer and engineer (track 6), mixing engineer (track 7), additional engineer (track 9)
- Sue Shifrin – producer (track 7)
- David Cassidy – producer (track 7)
- Guy Roche – producer (track 7)
- Greg Ladanyi – mixing engineer (track 10)
- Alan Douglas – mixing engineer (track 10)
- Dan Hersch – mastering engineer (at DigiPrep, Los Angeles)
- Gabrielle Raumberger – art direction
- Janet Wolsborn – design
- Caroline Greyshock – photography
- Jean-Francois Podevin – illustration
- Roger Dean – images from previous albums

== Charts ==
Chart (1990)	Peak position
Canada Top Albums/CDs (RPM)	82
Japanese Albums (Oricon)	24
Swiss Albums (Schweizer Hitparade)	39
US Billboard 200	114

== Certifications ==
Region	Certification	Certified units/sales
United States (RIAA)	Gold	500,000^{^}
^{^} Shipments figures based on certification alone.
