= Aurora (Asia EP) =

EP by Asia
- Released: 2 April 1986
- Recorded: 1981–1985
- Genres: Progressive rock; soft rock
- Length: 16:46
- Label: Geffen
- Producers: Mike Stone; Geoff Downes

Asia chronology
| Astra (1985) | Aurora (1986) | Then & Now (1990) |

Aurora is an extended play by English rock supergroup Asia, released on 2 April 1986 exclusively in Japan by Geffen Records.

It consists of four songs: "Too Late" from Astra (1985) and three B-sides from different singles. "Ride Easy" was originally available only as a B-side, on "Heat of the Moment" singles, released outside of the United Kingdom, and never appeared on a studio album. In an interview, released on the Fantasia: Live in Tokyo DVD (2007), vocalist and bassist John Wetton said that "Ride Easy" was one of his favorite Asia songs. "Daylight" was initially available as a B-side on "Don't Cry" singles and was featured as a bonus track on original Alpha (1983) cassette editions. "Lying to Yourself" was originally available only as a B-side, on "The Smile Has Left Your Eyes" singles, and never appeared on a studio album. All three B-sides were released on the compilation The Very Best of Asia: Heat of the Moment (1982–1990) (2000).

Aurora reached number 66 in Japan.

== Track listing ==
Side one
| No. | Title | Writer(s) | Length |
|---|---|---|---|
| 1. | "Too Late" | John Wetton, Geoff Downes, Carl Palmer | 4:16 |
| 2. | "Ride Easy" | Wetton, Steve Howe | 4:35 |

Side two
| No. | Title | Writer(s) | Length |
|---|---|---|---|
| 3. | "Daylight" | Wetton, Downes | 3:37 |
| 4. | "Lying to Yourself" | Wetton, Howe | 4:18 |
| Total length: | | | 16:46 |

== Personnel ==
=== Asia ===
- Geoff Downes – keyboards, vocals; producer (track 1)
- John Wetton – lead vocals, bass
- Mandy Meyer – guitar (track 1)
- Steve Howe – guitars and vocals (tracks 2–4)
- Carl Palmer – drums, percussion

=== Technical personnel ===
- Mike Stone – producer
- Yasutaka Kato – art direction, design
- Shigeru Bando – photography

== Charts ==
| Chart (1986) | Peak position |
|---|---|
| Japanese Singles (Oricon) | 66 |
