= Nightwing (band) =

British rock band

- Also known as: Gordon Rowley and Friends (1978–1980)
- Origin: United Kingdom
- Genres: Heavy metal, rock
- Years active: 1978–1987; 1996–present
- Label: Timeline Records
- Members: Steve Bartley; Barrie Roberts; Kerry Beswick; Tony Reid; Gordon Rowley; Eric Percival; Glynn Porrino
- Past members: Alec Johnson; Kenny Beswick; Seán Pugh; Berington Van Campen; Dave Tattum; Paul Elson; Eric Percival; David Evans; John Mylett; Kenny Newton; Max Bacon
- Website: http://www.nightwing.uk.com/

Nightwing is a British rock band, originally formed in 1978 as "Gordon and Friends" by bassist Gordon Rowley (formerly of Strife), keyboardist Kenny Newton, and guitarist Eric Bert Percival. The original line-up was Gordon Rowley, Eric Percival, Kenny Newton and Paul Ellson.

The band's line-up changed fairly consistently since its inception and, at one point, included vocalist Max Bacon (pre-Bronz), who would go on to be in the supergroup GTR and Dave Evans (formerly of the band Days of Grace and not to be confused with the first AC/DC singer of the same name). Some of the band's longer-lasting members include founding members Rowley, Newton and guitarists Alec Johnson and Glynn Porrino and drummer Steve Bartley. Seán Pugh joined the band temporarily as a second keyboard player and vocalist on some dates in the North West leg of the Something in the Air era, including Liverpool Royal Court and Blackpool. However, the experiment was abandoned due to Kenny Newton's reticence to share duties.

Nightwing disbanded in 1987, with Rowley and long-time drummer Steve Bartley moving on to a short-lived band called Razorback (not to be confused with Razorback) before re-forming in the 1990s. Their most recent album, 8472, was released in 2008 by Timeline Records and the band continues to tour.

== Formation, Something In The Air and Black Summer ==
Nightwing was formed when Gordon Rowley wanted to return to music, having left Strife due to a heart attack. Gordon had done some session work between leaving Strife, also turning down a spot in Rainbow in favor of forming his own band. This led to the formation of Nightwing, with keyboard player Kenny Newton, guitarist Eric Percival, and guitarist Alec Johnson as the core early line-up. With a variety of session drummers, including Paul Ellson, Steve Bartley, and John Mylett joining Rowley, Newton, Percival, and Johnson, Something in the Air was released in 1981, with "Barrel of Pain" by Graham Nash released as a single. For the tour and the following album, Black Summer, Steve Bartley became the full-time drummer for the band, the group playing Reading Festival and supporting Gillan.

In 1982, the line-up of Rowley, Newton, Johnson, and Bartley recorded and released Black Summer, which did particularly well in Eastern Europe, where the band would do an extensive tour.

== Max Bacon, Stand Up and Be Counted and My Kingdom Come ==
For their third album, Nightwing incorporated a lead vocalist into their line-up, vocal duties previously being shared predominantly between Rowley and Newton. Max Bacon joined the band in 1983 and Nightwing released Stand Up and Be Counted, from which "Treading Water" was released as a single.

For 1984's My Kingdom Come, the band had decided to do a cover of "Cell 151", written by Steve Hackett (of Genesis). Hackett decided to join Nightwing in the studio to co-produce the single "Night of Mystery", playing additional guitar on that track as well. The album cover was painted by Roger Dean, who had also painted album covers for Yes and Asia.

After the album was completed and before the resulting tour, Max Bacon left Nightwing with Steve Hackett to form the supergroup GTR, along with Steve Howe. Johnson left as well, causing Nightwing to be down a guitarist and singer before the tour was to begin.

== Dave Evans, Glynn Porrino, Night of Mystery - Alive! Alive! and Nightwing VI ==
For the My Kingdome Come tour, Nightwing enlisted Dave Evans on vocals and Glynn Porrino on lead guitar. The band would also record their first and only live album, Night of Mystery - Alive! Alive! on this tour from concerts in Yugoslavia and West Germany.

Nightwing returned to the studio in 1986 for their fifth studio album, sixth in total, named Nightwing VI, which also featured an album cover painted by Porrino and saxophone parts also by Porrino. This would be Nightwing's last studio recording until 1996 (the last full album until 2008). Tensions in the group led to Dave Evans and Kenny Newton leaving the band just after its completion, Kerry Beswick having also played some keyboards on the album. The band would tour in 1986/1987 as a four-piece with Rowley, Bartley, Porrino and Beswick, before disbanding completely later in the year.

== 1996 reunion, Natural Survivors, 2006 reunion and 8472 ==
After Nightwing split up in 1987, Gordon Rowley and Steve Bartley formed Razorback with Del Bromham of Stray. The sessions for this band were never officially released.

In 1996, Gordon Rowley reunited Nightwing, bringing together Glynn Porrino, Kenny Newton, and drummer Barry Roberts to record new tracks. One of the tracks "Mercenary Man", first written by Bartley in a band called The Skeleton Crew, later recorded by Razorback, was recorded by Nightwing. With two new compositions, one written by Porrino and an instrumental by Rowley, the three new tracks were put on a re-release of Nightwing VI named Natural Survivors, which featured different artwork, the old cover being used for the back.

Another song "Out in the Cold" was recorded during these sessions, but did not make the re-release. Later it was put on the 79 to 86 compilation album, released when the band re-formed once more in 2006, with the line-up of Rowley, Percival, Bartley, Beswick, and Porrino, with Roberts providing additional drums, and Tony Reid providing lead vocals and also playing additional guitar. This line-up would go on to record their most recent album 8472 in 2008.

== Discography ==
- Something in the Air (1981)
- Black Summer (1982)
- Stand Up and Be Counted (1983)
- My Kingdom Come (1984)
- A Night of Mystery – Alive! Alive! (live album) (1985)
- Nightwing VI (re-released in 1996 as Natural Survivors with some tracks from the Razorback sessions re-recorded by the band) (1986)
- Nightwing (compilation – Long Island Records) (1996)
- 79 to 86 (live) (compilation) (2006)
- 8472 (2008)

== See also ==
- List of new wave of British heavy metal bands
