= Jonathan Mover =

American drummer

- Origin: Peabody, Massachusetts, U.S.
- Genres: Neo-prog; progressive rock; new wave; heavy metal; hard rock
- Occupation: Musician
- Instruments: Drums, percussion, piano, keyboard

Jonathan Mover, a.k.a. "Mover", is an American drummer. He is a former member of the bands Marillion and GTR.

== Early life and career ==
Mover was raised in the Boston area and began playing drums at age thirteen. Primarily self-taught, he studied early on with Donn Carr and briefly attended Berklee College of Music until seeking out private study with Gary Chaffee before moving to London.

Shortly after arriving in London, Mover joined the neo-prog band Marillion in September 1983. He auditioned and got the role on the Wednesday, flew to Germany on the Thursday, and without rehearsals, performed on Friday with the band. They then headed straight to Rockfield Studios in Wales to write and record material for their second studio album, Fugazi. Having become the band's fourth drummer since the beginning of the year, within a month he had left the band due to a conflict with their lead singer, Fish. Mover received a writing credit for the single "Punch and Judy".

After leaving Marillion, Mover teamed up with Steve Hackett, formerly of Genesis, and Steve Howe, formerly of Yes, to start the supergroup known as GTR. The trio then recruited lead singer Max Bacon and bassist Phil Spalding. After one successful record and tour, Hackett quit the band, followed by Mover, since his allegiance was to Hackett. Not long after, having played a one-off gig with Steve Vai and Joe Satriani, Mover accepted the offer to continue work with Satriani on several records and tours, and made the move back to the USA after nine years in London, settling in New York City.

He lived part-time in Moscow during the four-year period of 1989–1993, producing, recording and performing with a variety of Russian artists.

Although Mover works primarily in the studio, he tours with Saigon Kick regularly, and with the Tubes, replacing their drummer Prairie Prince when Prince is busy touring with Todd Rundgren.

He toured with Alice Cooper on the Trash world tour. In June 2012, on two days' notice, Mover replaced Alice Cooper's injured drummer, reuniting with Cooper for his U.S.-Canadian summer tour with Iron Maiden and Cooper's headline tour of Europe.
