= Bronz =

English hard rock band

- Origin: Bath, England
- Genres: Hard rock
- Years active: 1976–1984, 2000–2013
- Labels: Bronze Records, Sanctuary Records
- Past members: Chris Goulstone; Simon Thomas; Windsor McGilvray; Shaun Kirkpatrick; Jake Kirkpatrick; Max Bacon; Paul Webb; Ian Baker; Michael O'Donoghue; Lee Reddings; Clive Deamer; Carl Matthews; Clive Edwards; Andy Welsford; Chris Giles

Bronz were an English hard rock band, formed in Bath in the mid-1970s. The band formed by Chris Goulstone played mainly around the UK and at the 'free festivals' of the time. These included performances at Stonehenge and Glastonbury in 1978.

== Career ==
After an early tie up with Dave Panton as their manager in 1980, the band played many support slots at The Marquee and Music Machine with Angel Witch, More, Diamond Head, and Anvil. The band reappeared in 1983, with Chris Goulstone on guitar, vocals and keyboards, Shaun Kirkpatrick on guitar and backing vocals, Clive Deamer on drums, plus Paul Webb on bass guitar and lead vocals. They were signed to an independent record label, Bronze Records. The band recorded Taken by Storm with Ritchie Cordell and Glen Kolotkin as producers, later helped by Gerry Bron and Mark Dearnley on extra production.

They were launched onto the American market via a tie-in between Bronze Records and Island. The line-up, then based in London, consisted of ex-Nightwing vocalist Max Bacon, Goulstone, Kirkpatrick, Webb and new drummer Carl Matthews. In 1998, an album of unreleased tracks from that time, entitled Unfinished Business was released.

In 1984, after a major US tour supporting Ratt, the band disassembled, with Goulstone and Matthews leaving and shortly after, Max Bacon who teamed up with GTR.

Kirkpatrick assembled a line-up called 'Blue Print'. With producer Max Norman they recorded tracks at the Roundhouse studios until the label went into receivership.

Bronz re-formed briefly in 2000, with the 1984 line-up including Paul Webb resuming lead vocal duties; plus Jake Kirkpatrick on bass guitar. The band played a number of shows together, and a release was tied up with Sanctuary Records in 2003, with an album of live tracks from their 1984 US tour and some new material. This was released as Bronz Live – Getting Higher.

In 2005, Bronz with Goulstone, Thomas, and Scottish drummer Windsor McGilvray, appeared at the 25th anniversary of the beginning of the new wave of British heavy metal, at the Astoria in London, along with Diamond Head and Jaguar.

In July 2013, guitarist Shaun Kirkpatrick died. At the time, Shaun was working on new material.

Chris Goulstone has been writing for TV and Film since, with Chapel of Rock Production Music (www.ChapelofRock.com) as a new outlet for sync around the globe.

== Band members ==
=== Former members ===
- Chris Goulstone – guitar, keyboards
- Simon Thomas – bass
- Windsor McGilvray – drums
- Max Bacon – lead vocals
- Ian Baker – lead vocals
- Paul Webb – vocals, bass
- Shaun Kirkpatrick – guitar, vocals
- Michael O'Donoghue – guitar
- Lee Reddings – bass
- Jake Kirkpatrick – bass
- Clive Deamer – drums
- Clive Edwards – drums
- Carl Matthews – drums
- Andy Welsford – drums
- Chris Giles – drums

== Discography ==
=== Studio albums ===
- Taken by Storm (1984) (featuring the single "Send Down an Angel" b/w "Tiger")
- Unfinished Business (1998)
- Bronz Live – Getting Higher (2003)
- Carried by the Storm (2010)

== See also ==
- List of new wave of British heavy metal bands
- GTR
