= Icon (Wetton and Downes album) =

Studio album by Wetton/Downes
- Released: 2 August 2005
- Recorded: Aubitt Studios, Southampton, UK
- Genre: Progressive rock
- Length: 57:05
- Label: Frontiers; UMe Digital (US online only)
- Producer: John Wetton and Geoffrey Downes

Wetton/Downes chronology
Wetton Downes (2002)	Icon (2005)	Rubicon (2006)

Professional ratings
Review scores
Source	Rating
AllMusic	3.5/5 stars
Classic Rock	6/10 stars

Icon is a studio album recorded and released by Asia band members John Wetton and Geoffrey Downes in 2005. It is the first in the Icon series (though they previously released the album Wetton Downes in 2002, a collection of demos from the 1980s).

Icon was followed by the albums Icon II: Rubicon in 2006 and Icon 3 in 2009. All three were reissued in 2018 by Epicon Records, a vanity label for Icon albums set up by Wetton's estate and Downes.

== Track listing ==
1. "Overture: Paradox/Let Me Go" – 6:28
2. "God Walks with Us" – 4:40
3. "I Stand Alone" – 6:08
4. "Meet Me at Midnight" – 2:34
5. "Hey Josephine" – 4:52
6. "Far Away" – 4:04
7. "Please Change Your Mind" – 4:46
8. "Sleep Angel" – 4:12
9. "Spread Your Wings" – 3:46
10. "In the End" (featuring Annie Haslam) – 4:47

[Nb: Track 1 is listed as 2 separate songs]

Bonus tracks

1. "There in Your Bed" – 2:24
2. "The Smile Has Left Your Eyes '05" – 3:42
3. "Heat of the Moment '05" – 4:38

An Icon EP was also released (on Frontiers Records), featuring selected tracks from the album, with some being remixes with orchestrations by Mike Stobbie (indicated by * below)

EP Tracklist

1. "Heat of the Moment '05" – 4:38
2. "Overture/Paradox"*
3. "Let Me Go"*
4. "The Smile Has Left Your Eyes '05" – 3:42
5. "In the End" (featuring Annie Haslam) – 4:47*
6. "There in Your Bed" – 2:24

== Personnel ==
- Geoffrey Downes – keyboards, vocoder, producer
- John Mitchell – guitars
- John Wetton – vocals, basses, classical and acoustic guitars, producer
- Steve Christey – drums
- Hugh McDowell – cello
- Rob Aubrey – engineer, mixing, mastering
