= GTR (album) =

Studio album by GTR
- Released: 24 April 1986
- Recorded: 1985–86
- Studios: The Townhouse, London
- Genre: Progressive rock
- Length: 44:43
- Label: Arista
- Producer: Geoff Downes

GTR chronology
GTR (1986)	King Biscuit Flower Hour Presents GTR (1997)

GTR is the only album from the English rock supergroup GTR, released in April 1986. The album peaked at No. 11 on the Billboard 200 chart, and the single "When the Heart Rules the Mind" reached No. 14 on the Billboard Hot 100 singles chart. Another single, "The Hunter", peaked at No. 85. In the UK, the album was released on 7 July 1986, where it reached No. 41 on the album charts.

An instrumental piece recorded by Yes, GTR and Asia guitarist Steve Howe years before, "Sketches in the Sun", was included on the album due to a shortage of content. It resurfaced on his solo albums Homebrew (1996), Motif Volume 1 (2008), Anthology (2015) and Homebrew 6 (2016). Steve Hackett's "Hackett to Bits" was a simplified version of the title track from his Please Don't Touch album. (It has no connection with the similarly titled "Hackett to Pieces" from Highly Strung.) Asia recorded their own version of the Geoff Downes-penned "The Hunter" for their 1997 compilation album Anthology.

The group, founded by Hackett and Howe, disbanded in 1987. Downes, who like Howe had been a member of Yes and Asia, produced the album.

The band's name, anecdotally, comes from the marking on the studio mixing console that indicates the 'guitar' volume control.

The album was reissued in 2001 as a remastered CD and again in 2006 as a Japanese mini-LP CD, but otherwise remained out of print until a deluxe 2-CD version was released in 2015.

== Reception ==
Professional ratings
Review scores
Source	Rating
AllMusic	3/5 stars
Rolling Stone	(not rated)
Kerrang!	5/5 stars

Paul Stump, in his History of Progressive Rock, said the album "managed to make two of the most distinctive guitarists in rock sound like autopiloted sessioneers at a Foreigner recording."

A retrospective review by Stephen Thomas Erlewine in Allmusic agreed that the album "didn't deliver the fireworks that Howe and Hackett fans desired. Part of the problem is that the two guitarists crowd each other out; it rarely sounds like they're trading licks, but rather like they're stepping forward for solos at their pre-scheduled times." He praised the hit single as "anthemic, professional stadium rock at its best" but said the rest of the album feels like a missed opportunity.

Musician reviewer J. D. Considine wrote simply: "SHT."

== Track listing ==
1. "When the Heart Rules the Mind" – 5:24 (Steve Hackett, Steve Howe)
2. "The Hunter" – 4:51 (Geoff Downes)
3. "Here I Wait" – 4:54 (Hackett, Howe)
4. "Sketches in the Sun" – 2:29 (Howe)
5. "Jekyll and Hyde" – 4:42 (Max Bacon, Hackett, Howe)
6. "You Can Still Get Through" – 4:53 (Hackett, Howe)
7. "Reach Out (Never Say No)" – 4:00 (Hackett, Howe, Phil Spalding)
8. "Toe the Line" – 4:29 (Hackett, Howe)
9. "Hackett to Bits" – 2:10 (Hackett)
10. "Imagining" – 5:49 (Hackett, Howe, Jonathan Mover)

=== Deluxe Reissue CD 1 - Studio Album plus bonus tracks ===
1. "The Hunter (Special GTR Mix)" – 4:56 (Geoff Downes)
2. "When The Heart Rules The Mind (Radio Edit)" – 4:28 (Hackett, Howe)
3. "The Hunter (Radio Edit)" – 4:00 (Geoff Downes)

=== Deluxe Reissue CD 2 - Live In Los Angeles, 19 July 1986 ===
1. "Jekyll and Hyde" – 5:47 (Hackett, Howe, Bacon)
2. "Here I Wait" – 5:55 (Hackett, Howe)
3. "Prizefighters" – 5:17 (Hackett, Howe)
4. "Imagining" – 7:12 (Hackett, Howe, Mover)
5. "Hackett to Bits" – 2:22 (Hackett)
6. "Spectral Mornings" – 3:57 (Hackett)
7. "I Know What I Like (In Your Wardrobe)" – 6:24 (Banks, Collins, Gabriel, Hackett, Rutherford)
8. "Sketches in the Sun" – 2:44 (Howe)
9. "Pennants" – 4:31 (Howe)
10. "Roundabout" – 8:38 (Anderson, Howe)
11. "The Hunter" – 6:44 (Geoff Downes)
12. "You Can Still Get Through" – 6:55 (Hackett, Howe)
13. "Reach Out (Never Say No)" – 5:54 (Hackett, Howe, Spalding)
14. "When the Heart Rules the Mind"– 6:06 (Hackett, Howe)

== Personnel ==
GTR

- Steve Howe – acoustic and electric guitars, guitar synthesizer, backing vocals
- Steve Hackett – acoustic and electric guitars, guitar synthesizer, backing vocals
- Max Bacon – lead vocals
- Phil Spalding – bass guitar, backing vocals
- Jonathan Mover – drums, percussion

=== Production ===
- Geoff Downes – producer
- Alan Douglas – engineer
- John Brough – assistant engineer
- Noel Haris – assistant engineer
- Andy Mason – assistant engineer
- Howard Fritzson – art direction
- Ian Miller – design
- Mike Russell – photography
- Miki Slingsby – photography
- Tom Biondo - photography
- Jimmy Starr – remastering
- Eddie Wilner – reissue producer

== Charts ==
=== Album ===
Chart (1986)	Peak position
Canada Top Albums/CDs (RPM)	30
Dutch Albums (Album Top 100)	40
German Albums (Offizielle Top 100)	39
Swedish Albums (Sverigetopplistan)	33
UK Albums (Official Charts)	41
US Billboard 200	11

Chart (2015)	Peak position
UK Independent Albums (Official Charts)	27

=== Singles ===
When the Heart Rules the Mind

Chart (1986)	Peak position
Canada Top Singles (RPM)	62
UK Singles (Official Charts)	82
US Billboard Hot 100	14
US Mainstream Rock (Billboard)	3

The Hunter

Chart (1986)	Peak position
US Billboard Hot 100	85
US Mainstream Rock (Billboard)	14

== Certifications ==
Region	Certification	Certified units/sales
Canada (Music Canada)	Gold	50,000^{^}
United States (RIAA)	Gold	500,000^{^}
^{^} Shipments figures based on certification alone.
