= Sole Survivor (Asia song) =

Single by Asia

from the album Asia
- B-side: "Here Comes the Feeling"
- Released: 29 October 1982
- Length: 4:52 (album version)
- Label: Geffen
- Songwriters: Geoff Downes, John Wetton
- Producer: Mike Stone

Asia singles chronology
"Only Time Will Tell" (1982)	"Sole Survivor" (1982)	"Don't Cry" (1983)

"Sole Survivor" is a song by English rock supergroup Asia. Written by Geoffrey Downes and John Wetton, it is the third track and third single from the band's 1982 eponymous debut. It was Asia's second single for the U.S Mainstream Rock Charts that reached the Top Ten. The single also peaked at #75 in Germany and #91 in the UK.

The song was covered by Japanese power metal band Galneryus for their 2008 cover album, Voices from the Past II. It was also used in some of the foreign versions of the 1982 Japanese anime Future War 198X.

In 2000, the song was referenced in satirical newspaper The Onion with a brief article titled "Sole Survivor of Air Crash Has Asia's 'Sole Survivor' Stuck in Head".

Billboard said that it "[underlines] a mix of instrumental rock drama and bittersweet lyrics."

PopMatters critic Dennis Shin rated the song's music video as one of "20 ’80s music videos that have aged terribly," saying that it "looks old as dirt, and a couple of the talking mullets on stage look like Joe Dirt."

== Track listing ==
7" Single

No.	Title	Length
1.	"Sole Survivor"	3:35
2.	"Here Comes the Feeling"	3:30

== Charts ==
Chart (1982)	Peak position
US Mainstream Rock Airplay (Billboard)	10
West Germany (GfK)	75
