= Get That Love =

Single by Thompson Twins

from the album Close to the Bone
- B-side: "Perfect Day"
- Released: 9 March 1987
- Genre: New wave; pop rock
- Length: 4:00
- Label: Arista Records
- Songwriters: Tom Bailey; Alannah Currie
- Producers: Rupert Hine; Tom Bailey

Thompson Twins singles chronology
"Nothing In Common" (1986)	"Get That Love" (1987)	"Long Goodbye" (1987)

"Get That Love" is a song by the British pop group Thompson Twins, released on 9 March 1987 as the lead single from their sixth studio album Close to the Bone. It was written by Alannah Currie and Tom Bailey, and produced by Rupert Hine and Bailey. "Get That Love" peaked at number 66 in the UK Singles Chart and spent four weeks in the Top 100. It fared better in America where it reached number 31 on the US Billboard Hot 100.

== Promotion ==
A music video was filmed to promote the single. It was directed by Andy Morahan and was produced by Richard Bell for Vivid Productions. It received medium rotation on MTV. The duo also performed the song on the UK TV talk show Wogan, backed by drummer Geoff Dugmore (who had played on the Close to the Bone album, though it is unclear whether he or Currie performed drums on "Get that Love" specifically), bassist Robin Goodfellow, and keyboardist Carrie Booth.

== Critical reception ==
Upon its release, Martin Shaw of Record Mirror commented, "A poppy, fonky piece of black slate, summed up by its ponderous brass constructed interlude. Like the Durannies, the Thompson Twins take a ride on the back of the dance explosion and water it down to a whimper." Len Brown of New Musical Express noted, "Here the Twins return to their comparatively more appealing 'Love On Your Side'/'In the Name of Love' tempo. It's still the same song – described in the press release as a 'distinct departure for them' – and thus certainly a hit." James Brown of Sounds wrote, "Easy to produce, easy on the ears and quite characterless, 'Get That Love' will obviously be a hit. Our culture demands it."

In the United States, Billboard described "Get That Love" as a "cheerful pop romp" which "seems to signal a swing back to jumpy spontaneity over hi-tech polish". Cash Box picked the single as one of their "feature picks" of March 1987 and described it as a "sparkling pop spectacle", with a "good, solid performance".

== Formats ==
7" Single

1. "Get That Love" – 4:00
2. "Perfect Day" – 4:26

12" Single

1. "Get That Love (Extended version)" – 6:28
2. "Get That Love (7" version)" – 4:00
3. "Perfect Day" – 4:26

12" Single (America only)

1. "Get That Love (Single version)" – 3:57
2. "Perfect Day" – 4:26
3. "Get That Love (Extended remix)" – 6:25
4. "Get That Love (Dub mix)" – 6:58

CD Single

1. "Get That Love (Extended version)" – 6:33
2. "Perfect Day" – 4:31
3. "Get That Love (Dub)" – 7:03
4. "Get That Love (7" version)" – 4:03

== Personnel ==
- Tom Bailey – lead vocals, keyboards, guitar, bass, associate producer, programming
- Alannah Currie – percussion, backing vocals, artwork direction

Additional personnel

- Rupert Hine – producer
- Geoff Dugmore - drums
- Griff Fender, Pikey Butler, The Mint Juleps – backing vocals
- Stephen W. Tayler – engineer
- Andie Airfix, Satori – artwork design
- Carrie Branovan – photography

== Chart performance ==
Chart (1987)	Peak position
French Singles Chart	10
Canadian Singles Chart	78
UK Singles Chart	66
U.S. Billboard Hot 100	31
