= Only Time Will Tell (song) =

Single by Asia

from the album Asia
- B-side: "Time Again" (International); "Ride Easy" (UK)
- Released: July 1982 (US); August 1982 (UK)
- Recorded: 1981
- Genre: Progressive rock
- Length: 4:48 (album version); 4:05 (7" single edit)
- Label: Geffen
- Songwriters: Geoff Downes; John Wetton
- Producer: Mike Stone

Asia singles chronology
"Heat of the Moment" (1982)	"Only Time Will Tell" (1982)	"Sole Survivor" (1982)

"Only Time Will Tell" is the second single released by the English rock supergroup Asia from their successful first album, Asia (1982).

The song was the band's third top 10 success on the US Hot Mainstream Rock Tracks chart, also reaching number 17 on the Billboard Hot 100 chart. It peaked at #54 in the UK.

== Background ==
Singer John Wetton said, "It's fairly self explanatory. It's my lyrics again; a very personal one about the end of a relationship, and it's my verse, Geoff's chorus (“Heat of the Moment” is the other way around). I had been stockpiling songs during the leadup to Asia, and a lot of my lyrics were about personal experience–Joni Mitchell is one of my all-time heroes, and she is undisputed queen of the confessional."

The song's music video received frequent airplay from MTV. In the video, a female gymnast performs flips and somersaults over rows of television sets. Band members are pictured singing and playing their instruments on the TV screens. In fact, the band members are never seen in the video other than as characters on television. Godley & Creme (Kevin Godley and Lol Creme) directed the video.

== Reception ==
Cash Box said that "it's a multi-layered progressive rock production with a simple, easily flowing melody at its core, thus providing a little something for both the rock and pop fan." Billboard praised the "thundering drums, widescreen keyboard" and the "affectingly direct vocal."

== Track listing ==
US 7" Single

No.	Title	Length
1.	"Only Time Will Tell"	4:05
2.	"Time Again"	4:45

UK 7" single

No.	Title	Length
1.	"Only Time Will Tell"	4:05
2.	"Ride Easy"	4:35

== Charts ==
=== Weekly charts ===
Chart (1982)	Peak position
Canada Top Singles (RPM)	7
UK Singles (Official Charts)	54
US Billboard Hot 100	17
US Mainstream Rock Airplay (Billboard)	8
West Germany (GfK)	50

=== Year-end charts ===
Chart (1982-1983)	Peak position
Canada Top Singles (RPM)	69
US (Joel Whitburn's Pop Annual)	109

== In popular culture ==
The song was used in the television series Cold Case third-season episode "The River", the series Family Guy eighth-season episode, "The Splendid Source", some of the foreign versions of the 1982 Japanese anime Future War 198X, and in the 2015 video game Metal Gear Solid V: The Phantom Pain.
