= Close to the Bone (Thompson Twins album) =

Album by Thompson Twins

Studio album by Thompson Twins
- Released: 30 March 1987
- Recorded: 1986–1987
- Studio: Studio Davout (Paris, France); Farmyard Studios (Buckinghamshire, England)
- Genre: Alternative rock; synth-pop
- Length: 41:42
- Label: Arista
- Producer: Rupert Hine; Tom Bailey

Thompson Twins chronology
Here's to Future Days (1985)	Close to the Bone (1987)	The Best of Thompson Twins: Greatest Mixes (1988)

Singles from Close to the Bone
- 1. "Get That Love" Released: 9 March 1987; 2. "Long Goodbye" Released: 11 May 1987; 3. "Bush Baby" Released: September 1987 (US)

Close to the Bone is the sixth studio album by the English pop band Thompson Twins, released on 30 March 1987 in the US and 6 April 1987 in the UK by Arista Records. Only the duo of Tom Bailey and Alannah Currie remained; this was the first album the group made without Joe Leeway. It was produced by Bailey and Rupert Hine.

Ending their run of Top 5 albums in the UK, the album was a commercial failure, peaking at number 90 in the UK and failing to yield any hit singles. It fared a little better in the US, peaking at number 76 on the Billboard Top 200, with the single "Get That Love" reaching number 31 on the Billboard Hot 100.

The album has been re-issued as part of the 2012 set Original Album Classics, which featured the studio albums Set (1982), Quick Step & Side Kick (1983), Into the Gap (1984), Here's to Future Days (1985) and Close to the Bone.

== Background ==
The Thompson Twins took a break from music in 1986. Following Joe Leeway's departure from the band, Bailey and Currie experienced the loss of their unborn child due to a miscarriage (Currie had also lost her mother the same year). Eventually, "to have something positive to do", the pair bought an old house in Ireland, moved in with Bailey's collection of religious objects and Currie's collection of first editions by British poet Edith Sitwell, and forgot about music altogether. When Currie felt like returning to music again, the pair started working on the next Thompson Twins album as a duo.

== Writing ==
Much of Close to the Bone reflected Bailey and Currie's personal experiences following Leeway's departure from the band. This included Bailey's reunion with his parents, who had disowned him over a decade before, and Currie suffering a miscarriage and losing her mother on the same day. Speaking of the song "Long Goodbye", Currie said: "I spent all of last summer crying. It was an awful time, and I put a lot of my feelings into that song. It was like a parting gift. It's all OK now. I'm OK. But I still can't bear to listen to that song." Speaking to the Deseret News, Currie added: "I spent the whole summer grieving. This album came out of that. The songs are like your own children. They take on a life of their own. They all have different sorts of moods."

Speaking of the album to the Chicago Tribune, Bailey said: "We felt that this album was a little rawer, a little closer to the truth, than anything we had done before. Sometimes it was uncomfortable because we did this album very, very quickly, thinking that if we didn't take a lot of time, we wouldn't be tempted to cover our personalities and polish everything. The reason the album is closer to the bone is that for the first time in years we had taken a break from the music business and we actually had real experiences that we wanted to write about. When you tour all the time, things can become so circular and one-dimensional. I never realized it before, but taking time away for whatever reason is great for your songwriting."

== Promotion ==
A full American tour was a major part of the album's promotion, which included concerts in almost 50 cities. The last official concert was to be in Dallas, Texas, in August 1987, however the band went on to play two extra shows afterwards, with the last being in South Florida. As previous tours had involved highly theatrical staging courtesy of Leeway, Bailey and Currie chose to focus on the music rather than the effects for the Close to the Bone tour. Close to the Bone proved to be the last Thompson Twins record promoted by a tour. The songs performed live from the Close to the Bone album were "Get That Love", "Gold Fever", "Twentieth Century", "Long Goodbye", "Follow Your Heart", "Bush Baby" and "Perfect Day".

== Critical reception ==
Professional ratings
Review scores
Source	Rating
AllMusic	2/5 stars
Record Mirror	1/5 stars
The Rolling Stone Album Guide (1992 Edition)	1.5/5 stars
The Spokesman-Review (US)	2/5 stars

Upon its release, David Quantick of New Musical Express felt Close to the Bone was "merely another '80s LP" with many of the songs being "commercial music of the most ordinary nature". He was critical of Hine's "more taste than panache" production and felt that only Bailey's "cawing voice" and the "occasional snatches of Twins-type melody" provided any means of identifying the Thompson Twins on the album. Quantock praised the "heartfelt content" of Currie's lyrics for raising the album above a "collection of vague dancefloor soliloquising". He felt the "curious ungainliness of ballads" such as "Long Goodbye" and "Perfect Day" recalled the Twins' older work like "Sister of Mercy" and added that he "nearly like[d] the terse 'Bush Baby' for its didgeridoo-stylings and Bailey's oddly restrained singing". Stuart Bailie of Record Mirror was also critical of the album, calling it "feeble" and "a summary of the worst of early Eighties pop". He felt Bailey's voice "flounders badly" and added, "The dog-eared ideas that pass as songs are still padded out with fake oriental bits and even duller dance gestures." Fred Dellar of Hi-Fi News & Record Review considered the album to be a "heavily dance-oriented release" and singled out "Dancing in Your Shoes", "Gold Fever" and "Get That Love" as having "the hooks and looks of hits". He added that it "isn't at all a bad album judged on pure pop appeal".

In the US, Billboard felt that "Get That Love" had commercial appeal, but added that the album "lacks any strong follow-ups". They noted "Bush Baby" for its "novelty appeal" and considered "Dancing in Your Shoes" catchy. Ken Tucker, writing for The Spokesman-Review, believed the album had the Twins' "most facile songwriting" and their "slickest" production. He added, "This means that the music is often catchy but rarely substantial." In a retrospective review, Stephen Thomas Erlewine of AllMusic noted that the Twins' "abandoned new wave synth-pop for light funk-inflected dance-pop". He felt that most of the album was "too sterile and predictable to be truly enjoyable", but added that some tracks "serve as a reminder that the group can turn out well-constructed and catchy pop songs when they choose". Ira Robbins of Trouser Press described the album as "modest and, for the most part, likable", with Currie's lyrics taking a "surprisingly reflective approach, suggesting doubt and anxiety instead of the usual oblique contemplations."

== Track listing ==
All tracks are written by Tom Bailey and Alannah Currie.

No.	Title	Length
1.	"Follow Your Heart"	3:54
2.	"Bush Baby"	4:10
3.	"Get That Love"	4:00
4.	"Twentieth Century"	4:01
5.	"Long Goodbye"	4:22
6.	"Still Waters"	3:36
7.	"Savage Moon"	4:40
8.	"Gold Fever"	4:03
9.	"Dancing in Your Shoes"	4:25
10.	"Perfect Day"	4:27
Total length:		41:42

== Personnel ==
Thompson Twins

- Tom Bailey – lead vocals, keyboards, programming, guitars, bass
- Alannah Currie – drums, percussion, marimba, xylophone, backing vocals

Additional musicians

- Jamie West-Oram – guitars
- Geoff Dugmore – drums
- Griff Fender – backing vocals
- Pikey Butler – backing vocals
- The Mint Juleps – backing vocals

Production and artwork

- Rupert Hine – producer
- Tom Bailey – associate producer
- Andrew Scarth – recording
- Stephen W. Tayler – recording, mixing
- Robin Goodfellow – assistant engineer
- Laurent Lozahic – assistant engineer
- Greg Calbi – mastering at Sterling Sound (New York City, New York, US)
- Arun Chakraverty – mastering at The Master Room (London, UK)
- Alannah Currie – art direction
- Andie Airfix / Satori Graphic – artwork, design
- Carrie Branovan – photography
- John Hade – management

== Chart performance ==
Chart (1987)	Peak position
Canadian Albums Chart	71
New Zealand Albums Chart	46
Norwegian Albums Chart	20
Swedish Albums Chart	26
UK Albums Chart	90
US Top Pop Albums (Billboard)	76
