= Nothing in Common (Thompson Twins song) =

Single by Thompson Twins

from the album Nothing in Common (Soundtrack)
- B-side: "Nothing to Lose"
- Released: July 1986
- Recorded: 1986
- Genre: Pop rock
- Length: 3:24
- Label: Arista Records
- Songwriter(s): Alannah Currie, Tom Bailey
- Producer(s): Geoffrey Downes, Tom Bailey

Thompson Twins singles chronology
"Revolution" (1986)	"Nothing in Common" (1986)	"Get That Love" (1987)

Alternative cover
- Cover used for both 7" and 12" Singles.

"Nothing in Common" is a song by the British band Thompson Twins, which was released in 1986 as a single from the soundtrack of the American comedy-drama film Nothing in Common. The song was written by Alannah Currie and Tom Bailey, and produced by Geoffrey Downes and Bailey. With the departure of band member Joe Leeway earlier in 1986, "Nothing in Common" was the Thompson Twins' first release as a duo. It reached No. 54 on the US Billboard Hot 100.

== Promotion ==
A music video was filmed to promote the single, featuring Tom Hanks and various clips from the movie. It was directed by Meiert Avis and produced by Jon Small for Picture Vision. It achieved active rotation on MTV.

== Critical reception ==
On its release, Billboard considered the song to "sound a little rockier and less melancholy" than the Thompson Twins' past hits.

== Formats ==
7" single

1. "Nothing in Common" - 3:24
2. "Nothing to Lose" - 4:15

7" single (Philippines release)

1. "Nothing in Common" - 3:24
2. "If You Were Here" - 2:53

7" single (South Africa release)

1. "Nothing in Common" - 3:24
2. "Nothing In Common (7" Remix)" - 4:06

7" single (US promo)

1. "Nothing in Common" - 3:24
2. "Nothing in Common" - 3:24

12" single

1. "Nothing in Common" (7" Single) – 3:30
2. "Revolution" (Extended Remix) – 6:25 (Lennon/McCartney)
3. "Nothing in Common" (7" Remix) – 4:08
4. "Nothing in Common" (Street Mix - Vocal & Instrumental) – 6:22
5. "Nothing in Common" (Club Mix) – 7:38

12" single (German release)

1. "Nothing in Common" (Club Mix) – 7:38
2. "Nothing in Common" (Street Mix - Vocal & Instrumental) – 6:22
3. "Nothing in Common" (7" Remix) – 4:08

== Chart performance ==
Chart (1986)	Peak position
Canadian RPM Top Singles	68
US Billboard Hot 100	54
US Billboard Dance/Club Play Songs	38

== Personnel ==
- Geoffrey Downes, Tom Bailey - producers
- Owen Davies - engineer
- Robin Goodfellow - technical coordinator
- Alannah Currie - artwork direction
