= Nothing in Common =

1986 film by Garry Marshall

Nothing In Common
- Theatrical release poster
- Directed by: Garry Marshall
- Written by: Rick Podell; Michael Preminger
- Produced by: Alexandra Rose
- Starring: Tom Hanks; Jackie Gleason; Eva Marie Saint; Hector Elizondo; Barry Corbin; Bess Armstrong
- Cinematography: John A. Alonzo
- Edited by: Glenn Farr
- Music by: Patrick Leonard
- Production companies: Delphi Films; Rastar
- Distributed by: Tri-Star Pictures
- Release date: July 30, 1986 (United States)
- Running time: 118 minutes
- Country: United States
- Language: English
- Budget: US$12 million
- Box office: $32.3 million

Nothing in Common is a 1986 American comedy-drama film directed by Garry Marshall. It stars Tom Hanks and Jackie Gleason in his final film role. Gleason died less than a year after the film's release.

The film was not considered a big financial success on initial release, though it became more popular as Hanks' fame grew. It is considered by some to be a pivotal role in Hanks' career because it marked his transition from less developed comedic roles to leads in more serious stories, and many critics also praised Gleason's performance.

== Plot ==
David Basner, a shallow, childish yuppie recently promoted at his Chicago ad agency, returns to work from a vacation. His father, a career salesman, tells him that his wife, David's mother, has left him after 36 years of marriage. David must now care for his aging, bitter father, Max, and support his emotionally fragile mother, Lorraine. His father is then fired after 35 years in the garment industry.

Although David's ex-girlfriend, Donna, is sympathetic, she tells him he ought to "grow up." David believes that if he became less childlike, his advertising work could be adversely affected.

David is developing a commercial for Colonial Airlines, owned by the rich and bullish Andrew Woolridge. A successful ad campaign would likely gain him a partnership in his company. David develops a physical relationship with Woolridge's daughter, Cheryl Ann Wayne. David's father is well aware of his playboy nature and critical of his frivolous lifestyle.

His parents each begin to rely more on David. His mother needs help moving to a new apartment. His father needs to be driven to his doctor. David is awakened late one night when his mother's date ends badly, and she reveals that Max humiliated her sexually and was unfaithful. Confronting his father, he tells him, "Tomorrow I'm shooting a commercial about a family who loves each other, who cares about each other. I'm fakin' it." David becomes distracted by his attention-demanding parents, which affects his work.

As a peace offering, David takes Max out to a club to hear some jazz music. He discovers that Max is severely diabetic and hasn't been following his diet. As a result, Max may require amputation of his legs. Lorraine visits Max in the hospital and they discuss their life together, and she condemns him for his abuse. Privately, Max is overwhelmed with regret.

Woolridge insists that David accompany him to New York to promote the new ad campaign, which would prevent him from being present for Max's surgery. When David refuses, he loses the account. His boss Charlie is sympathetic and assures him he will intercede with Woolridge, giving David time to be with his father. Max has the surgery and loses his toes and part of a foot.

When David confides in Donna about the situation at work and his father's health problems, she gives him a sympathetic ear. He reaches out for her hand, and it's clear that they are mutually interested again.

David brings Max home from the hospital, and Max tells him, "You were the last person I thought would ever come through for me." When David returns to his job, he takes Max along while he shoots commercials.

== Cast ==
- Tom Hanks as David Basner
- Jackie Gleason as Max Basner
- Eva Marie Saint as Lorraine Basner
- Héctor Elizondo as Charlie Gargas
- Barry Corbin as Andrew Woolridge
- Sela Ward as Cheryl Ann Wayne
- Bess Armstrong as Donna Mildred Martin

== Critical reception ==
The film received mixed reviews from critics. Review aggregator Rotten Tomatoes reports that 58% out of 24 professional critics gave the film a positive review, with an average score of 6/10.

Roger Ebert of The Chicago Sun-Times awarded the film a 2.5 out of 4 stars and stated in his review, "The movie splits in two, starting out as a wise-guy comedy and ending up as the heart-breaking story of a yuppie who is trying to understand his bitter, lonely parents."

Stanley Kauffmann of The New Republic, while praising the work of Gleason and Hanks, was not impressed by Héctor Elizondo's performance. Kauffmann summed up his review writing "Nothing in Common is a jigsaw puzzle with several parts missing at the end, parts that would explain why the puzzle was worth assembling".

Audiences polled by CinemaScore gave the film an average grade of "A−" on an A+ to F scale.

== Soundtrack ==
1. "Nothing in Common" by Thompson Twins - 3:30
2. "Burning of the Heart" by Richard Marx - 4:15
3. "If It Wasn't Love" by Carly Simon - 4:18
4. "Over the Weekend" by Nick Heyward - 3:58
5. "Loving Strangers" (David's Theme From Nothing In Common) by Christopher Cross - 4:03
6. "Until You Say You Love Me" by Aretha Franklin - 4:50
7. "Don't Forget to Dance" by The Kinks - 4:35
8. "No One's Gonna Love You" by Real To Reel - 4:12
9. "Seven Summers" by Cruzados - 4:38
10. Instrumental Theme by Patrick Leonard - 2:08

The soundtrack was released on LP, CD and cassette in 1986 by Arista Records.

== Television series ==
The movie inspired a short-lived NBC sitcom in 1987 that was scheduled to follow the highly rated Cheers. Due to audience drop-off, the sitcom was cancelled. The series starred Todd Waring as David Basner and Bill Macy as his father Max Basner.

== See also ==
- List of films featuring diabetes
