= Long Goodbye (song) =

1987 single by Thompson Twins

Single by Thompson Twins

from the album Close to the Bone
- B-side: "Dancing in Your Shoes"
- Released: 18 May 1987
- Recorded: 1986
- Genre: Pop rock
- Length: 3:32
- Label: Arista
- Songwriters: Alannah Currie; Tom Bailey
- Producers: Rupert Hine; Tom Bailey

Thompson Twins singles chronology
"Get That Love" (1987)	"Long Goodbye" (1987)	"In the Name of Love '88" (1988)

"Long Goodbye" is a song by the English pop group Thompson Twins, released on 18 May 1987 as the second and final single from their sixth studio album, Close to the Bone (1987). It was written by Alannah Currie and Tom Bailey, and produced by Rupert Hine and Bailey. "Long Goodbye" peaked at No. 89 on the UK singles chart.

== Writing ==
"Long Goodbye" was inspired by the grief suffered by Currie and Bailey when they lost their baby to a miscarriage and the death of Currie's mother on the same day. After several months of grieving, the pair began writing new material for the next Thompson Twins album, Close to the Bone. Following the release of the lead single "Get That Love", the duo's label Arista selected "Long Goodbye" as the follow-up.

Currie told The Chicago Tribune in 1987: "I can't hear it without crying. I'll turn the radio off when it comes on. I skip that song on the album. It's weird to me that they're releasing it as a single, because for me it's a grieving song. I spent all of last summer crying. It was an awful time, and I put a lot of my feelings into that song. It was like a parting gift - I believe that people continue on spiritually after they die - and it was nice to write a tribute to my mother, who was so wonderful. But it was sad, and it was impossible to separate my feelings about my mother's death and the miscarriage. "Long Goodbye" is all of those things condensed into something quite subtle and quite painful. It's all okay now, I'm okay, and I'm looking forward to having children in the future. But... I still can't bear to listen to that song."

== Music video ==
A music video was filmed to promote the single. It was directed by Meiert Avis and produced by Paul Spencer for Midnight Films. In the US, it received medium rotation on MTV and play on The Record Guide network. The video has two versions with different endings, shortly after the scene where Currie pulls down curtains from a window. One version ends with a silhouette of Bailey against a bright background. The other version ends in a light-hearted moment with Currie beside Bailey at the piano and he thumbs his nose and wiggles his fingers at her.

== Critical reception ==
On its release, Ian Cranna of Smash Hits described the song as "slow [and] reflective". He questioned the decision to release the song as a single but added, "Nevertheless, it's still their best for ages - a gentle, wistful piano song that recalls 'Sister of Mercy' with an appropriately anguished middle bit. And for once they show their true colours as sympathetic real people instead of something out of an advert - fingers crossed for a hit." Roger Morton of Record Mirror felt the duo "sound far too sorry for themselves to be hungry with this slow fade to piano blues". He added, "Might have been a half-decent song if it hadn't reminded me so much of early Police."

In the United States, Billboard commented, "Preferred selection from Close to the Bone is a poignant midtempo ballad that receives the band's customary ornate and lavish treatment". Jacob N. Lunders of AllMusic called the song "reflective". In a review of the band's 1987 Park West Stage concert, The Deseret News commented: ""Long Goodbye" is a moving, almost eerie-sounding ballad on the album. But played live, it didn't pack much emotional power, despite Currie dedicating it to her mother and child, who both died last year."

== Formats ==
7" single

1. "Long Goodbye" – 3:32
2. "Dancing In Your Shoes" – 4:28

12" single

1. "Long Goodbye" (Extended Mix) – 7:56
2. "Long Goodbye" (7" Version) – 3:32
3. "Dancing In Your Shoes" (7" Version) – 4:28

CD single

1. "Long Goodbye" (Extended Mix) – 7:56
2. "Dancing In Your Shoes" (7" Version) – 4:28
3. "Hold Me Now" (12" Version) – 9:54

CD single (promo)

1. "Long Goodbye" (7" Version) – 3:47
2. "Long Goodbye" (Extended Mix) – 4:56♦

♦Exclusive mix found only on the promo.

== Personnel ==
Thompson Twins

- Tom Bailey – vocals, guitar, keyboards
- Alannah Currie – percussion

Production

- Rupert Hine, Tom Bailey – producers
- Stephen W. Tayler – engineer
- Andrew Scarth, Robin Goodfellow – assistant engineers

Other

- Alannah Currie – artwork direction
- Andie Airfix, Satori – artwork design
- Carrie Branovan – photography

== Charts ==
Chart (1987)	Peak position
UK Singles Chart	89

== Official versions ==
Version	Length	Comment
Album Version	4:22	Found on the album Close To The Bone.
7" Single Version	3:32	Found on the 7" vinyl single (Arista AS1-9609) and the CD single promo (Arista ASCD 9600). The CD version has a duration of 3:47 (longer fade).
Extended Mix	7:56	Found on the 12" vinyl single (Arista TWINS 1213), and the UK/European CD single (Arista TWINCD 13).
Extended Mix	4:57	A shorter extended version of the song found exclusively on the CD single promo (Arista ASCD 9600).
Remix	4:33	A slightly different and unique version found exclusively on the CD Greatest Hits (1996 Arista).
Album Edit	4:14	Similar to the album version of the song, but with a shorter fade. Found on Love On Your Side - The Best Of The Thompson Twins (2007 Demon), and Thompson Twins - The Greatest Hits (1990 Stylus/BMG).
