= Alpha (Asia album) =

Studio album by Asia
- Released: 12 August 1983
- Recorded: February–May 1983
- Studios: Le Studio, Quebec; Manta Sound, Toronto
- Genres: Progressive pop; pop rock; art rock
- Length: 42:16
- Label: Geffen
- Producer: Mike Stone

Asia chronology
Asia (1982)	Alpha (1983)	Astra (1985)

Singles from Alpha
- 1. "Don't Cry" Released: July 1983; 2. "The Smile Has Left Your Eyes" Released: October 1983; 3. "The Heat Goes On" Released: January 1984 (Japan)

Alpha is the second studio album by English rock supergroup Asia, released on 12 August 1983 by Geffen Records. It was recorded at Le Studio in Morin-Heights, Quebec, and Manta Sound in Toronto from February to May 1983. Alpha adopted a notably more polished sound with radio-friendly elements and less emphasis on progressive rock sections. Like its multi-platinum predecessor, the album was produced by Mike Stone. It was also the last album to feature the band's original line-up for twenty-five years until Phoenix, which was released in 2008.

The cover artwork was designed by Roger Dean, known for his work with Yes, of which Howe and keyboard player Geoff Downes had previously been members.

== Production ==
After Asia wrapped up their world tour for the debut album, they opted to move to Le Studio to record the followup. Intra-band conflict ensued, particularly between John Wetton and Steve Howe over who was more responsible for the band's initial success. Howe recalled in All My Yesterdays, his 2021 autobiography, that in hindsight the sessions were too rushed; Geffen was eager to capitalise on the group's success and wanted to get a second album out as soon as it could. The band and the music would have, in Howe's opinion, benefited from taking a more deliberate approach. The band's mood was also complicated by the cabin fever that resulted in being in an isolated area of Quebec over the winter.

Record label executives requested Wetton and Downes write all the songs, since the hit singles from the band's first album had been their compositions. Howe thus had very little to do in terms of writing. His only song credit, "Lying to Yourself", was released as a B-side. It had originally been "Barren Land", a song about the mistreatment of Native Americans, but John Kalodner persuaded Howe to change it out of fears it would be "too controversial".

The song "Don't Cry" was written and added at the last minute, as the band felt the album lacked a strong opener. Howe recalls that as it became complete and the band listened to it, they were disappointed by how commercial it sounded. Due to the tensions within the group, producer Mike Stone was put in charge of mixing the album, where technical glitches delayed its release by several months. The band was unhappy with his final mix, with Howe describing it as a "wall of sound". They demanded a remix, which was done but did not alleviate their concerns much. There was no time for further remixes as the album's release date had been set for early August 1983 and concert dates had been scheduled.

A music video was shot for "Don't Cry", reportedly costing over $100,000 to film due to the elaborate set designs involved in it.

== Commercial performance ==
The album reached number 6 on the Billboard 200 chart and has been certified platinum for over 1 million copies sold in the United States. In the United Kingdom, the album peaked at number 5 and has been awarded a platinum certification for over 250,000 copies sold. Despite this, it failed to meet the expectations of the record company executives, who wanted it to match the sales of the debut album.

Alpha spawned two singles. The lead-off single, "Don't Cry", reached number 10 on the Billboard Hot 100 and climbed to the top of the Mainstream Rock chart. It was the sole Top 40 entry for Asia in the United Kingdom, peaking at number 33. The B-side of the single, "Daylight", was featured as a bonus track on album original cassette editions, and also appeared on the Mainstream Rock charts, at number 24. The second single, "The Smile Has Left Your Eyes", reached number 34 on the Billboard Hot 100 and number 25 on the Mainstream Rock charts and was the group's last major hit. Along with the singles, "The Heat Goes On" and "True Colors" were quite popular on mainstream rock radio stations.

== Critical reception ==
Professional ratings
Review scores
Source	Rating
AllMusic	3/5 stars

The album has received lukewarm reviews from music critics. J. D. Considine in his review for Rolling Stone described Alpha as "a sort of sonic confection, a concoction of tasty melodies, sweet harmonies and goopy lyrics intended more for greedy consumption than for artistic appreciation". Chas de Whalley of Kerrang! was less than restrained and openly said that "this album is complete and utter rubbish from beginning to end and a waste of the good vinyl it's pressed on". Tom Demalon has given the album a retrospective rating of three stars out of five on AllMusic. "Don't Cry", "My Own Time (I'll Do What I Want)" and "Open Your Eyes" have been selected as three "Track Picks". He has compared the album with Asia and has summarized that "nothing on Alpha packs the sheer sonic force of the band's debut".

== Re-releases ==
Alpha has been re-issued numerous times, particularly in Japan. Platinum SHM-CD with a DSD flat transfer from original master tapes was released by Universal Music in 2014 and included "Daylight" and "Lying to Yourself" as bonus tracks. In 2017, the album was released on Audio Fidelity hybrid SACD remastered by Kevin Gray.

== Track listing ==
All tracks are written by John Wetton and Geoff Downes, except "The Smile Has Left Your Eyes" written by Wetton and "Lying to Yourself" written by Wetton and Steve Howe. All tracks arranged by Asia.

Side one: Alpha
No.	Title	Length
1.	"Don't Cry"	3:33
2.	"The Smile Has Left Your Eyes"	3:13
3.	"Never in a Million Years"	3:47
4.	"My Own Time (I'll Do What I Want)"	4:50
5.	"The Heat Goes On"	4:57

Side two: Beta
No.	Title	Length
6.	"Eye to Eye"	3:13
7.	"The Last to Know"	4:39
8.	"True Colors"	3:51
9.	"Midnight Sun"	3:48
10.	"Open Your Eyes"	6:25
Total length:		42:16

Cassette and UK CD bonus track
No.	Title	Length
11.	"Daylight"	3:32
Total length:		46:02

2014 Universal Music Platinum SHM-CD limited edition bonus tracks
No.	Title	Length
11.	"Daylight"	3:34
12.	"Lying to Yourself"	4:13
Total length:		50:12

== Personnel ==
=== Asia ===
- Geoff Downes – keyboards
- Steve Howe – guitars
- Carl Palmer – drums
- John Wetton – vocals, bass guitars

=== Technical personnel ===
- Mike Stone – production, engineering, recording, mixing
- Paul Northfield – engineering, recording, mixing
- Rob Whelan, Frank Opolko – assistants
- Greg Fulginiti – mastering
- Roger Dean – cover design

== Charts ==
Chart (1983)	Peak position
Australian Albums (Kent Music Report)	46
Canada Top Albums/CDs (RPM)	10
Dutch Albums (Album Top 100)	9
Finnish Albums (The Official Finnish Charts)	14
French Albums (SNEP)	19
German Albums (Offizielle Top 100)	11
Italian Albums (Musica e dischi)	13
Japanese Albums (Oricon)	4
Norwegian Albums (VG-lista)	8
Swedish Albums (Sverigetopplistan)	9
Swiss Albums (Schweizer Hitparade)	18
UK Albums (Official Charts)	5
US Billboard 200	6

== Certifications ==
Region	Certification	Certified units/sales
Canada (Music Canada)	Platinum	100,000^{^}
Japan (RIAJ)	2× Platinum	400,000
United Kingdom (BPI)	Platinum	300,000^{^}
United States (RIAA)	Platinum	1,000,000^{^}
^{^} Shipments figures based on certification alone.
