= Wetton Downes =

Wetton/Downes

Studio album by Wetton/Downes
- Released: 2002
- Genre: Progressive rock
- Length: 61:12
- Language: English
- Label: Stallion Records
- Producer: Wetton/Downes

Wetton/Downes chronology
Wetton/Downes (2002)	Icon (2005)

Wetton/Downes (sometimes stylised as Wetton-Downes or Wetton & Downes, though the album is given no official title) is the first album released by Asia member Geoff Downes and former Asia member John Wetton, and is a precursor to their Icon series. It is essentially a collection of (previously unreleased) demo tracks, mostly recorded during Asia's hiatus in the late 1980s through the time of their brief reformation in 1990. In September 2017, Downes announced (via his Twitter account) the re-release of this title, with remastered sound and additional tracks, as Icon Zero on Epicon Records.

== Track listing ==
All tracks are written by John Wetton and Geoffrey Downes; unless noted.

No.	Title	Writer(s)	Length
1.	"Walking On Air"		4:31
2.	"I Would Die for You"		3:11
3.	"Only You"		5:41
4.	"Running Out of Time"		4:11
5.	"Soul"	Geoff Downes	4:16
6.	"Just As Long (As I Need You)"		4:13
7.	"Don't Say It Again"		3:28
8.	"Oh! Carolann"	Sue Shifrin	5:22
9.	"Kari-Anne"	Sue Shifrin	5:12
10.	"Lost in America"		4:42
11.	"Please"		4:49
12.	"Summer (Can't Last Too Long)"		4:05
13.	"We Move As One"		4:03
14.	"Christina" (Live)	John Wetton	4:16

== Personnel ==
- Geoffrey Downes – keyboards, programming
- John Wetton – lead guitar, bass, lead vocals
- Scott Gorham – guitar on "Kari-Anne"
- Francis Dunnery – guitar solo on "Kari-Anne"
- Mike Sturgis – drums on "Kari-Anne"
- Agnetha Fältskog – vocals on "We Move As One"

== Production ==
- Produced By Wetton/Downes
