= The Work Tapes =

Demo album by Glenn Hughes/ Geoff Downes
- Released: 1998
- Recorded: June 1991
- Genre: Pop, Funk, Soul, R&B
- Length: 44:28
- Label: Blueprint Records
- Producer: Glenn Hughes; Geoff Downes

Professional ratings
Review scores
Source	Rating
Allmusic	1.5/5 stars

The Work Tapes is an album of demos recorded by vocalist Glenn Hughes (Deep Purple/ Black Sabbath/ Trapeze) and keyboardist Geoff Downes (Asia /Buggles /Yes). The sessions were originally recorded in June 1991, but did not receive an official release until 1998.

== History ==
By 1991, Glenn Hughes’ solo career had yet to take off, he had spent much of the eighties in short lived musical collaborations with the likes of Pat Thrall, Black Sabbath and Gary Moore he had failed to establish himself long-term. This was, in part due to drug issues that had first surfaced in the seventies, while he was in Deep Purple and continued throughout the following decade.

Hughes had first met keyboardist Geoff Downes when they were introduced to one another by Downes's then- Asia band-mate Pat Thrall (who had worked with Hughes in Hughes/Thrall). Downes had joined Hughes to record keyboard parts for an intended solo album financed by Bronze Records, but that record was subsequently shelved and remains unreleased. Downes also joined Hughes to play keyboards on a brief 1991 Trapeze reunion tour.

In June 1991, Hughes teamed up Downes again and the two spent a week in Nomis Studios, London. They were there at the suggestion of their publishing company to write material for a new Hughes solo album.

For the sessions the pair decided to write material in a more mainstream pop and soul direction, rather than the hard and progressive rock they were associated with. The pair wrote songs at a fast pace during their one week in the studio, writing more than a song a day.

Due to a number of reasons the project did not go beyond that week and the material was shelved. The demos were leaked and became commonly available as bootlegs.

In 1998, Blueprint Records decided to give the rehearsal tapes an official release in the form of The Work Tapes. The tracks were not added to and the sound-quality of the release is not comparable to that of a studio album. It is a document of interest to fans of Hughes and Downes, rather than a complete work.

The content of The Work Tapes was released again in 2005 in a two-CD set entitled Roads of Destiny. This release was labelled as an album by Geoff Downes and Glenn Hughes, but it features only one other song with Hughes; a cover version of the Buggles song Video Killed the Radio Star, which was originally released on Downes's 1992 solo album Vox Humana. The rest of Roads to Destiny is instrumental music that does not feature Hughes.

== Track listing ==
All songs written by Downes and Hughes

1. "Bed Of Roses" – 3:58
2. "Don't Walk Away" – 4:23
3. "Love For Sale" – 3:55
4. "Push" – 4:25
5. "Funk Music" – 5:09
6. "Double Life" – 4:56
7. "How Was I To Know?" – 4:03
8. "Walking On A Thin Line" – 4:36
9. "Dance With Me" – 5:00
10. "Feel The Magic" – 4:03

== Credits ==
=== Performers ===
- Glenn Hughes – Vocals
- Geoff Downes – Keyboards/Synthesizers/Drum programming
