= Asia (Asia album) =

- Cover art by Roger Dean

Studio album by Asia
- Released: 18 March 1982 (US); 2 April 1982 (UK)
- Recorded: June–November 1981
- Studios: Marcus Recording, London; The Town House, London
- Genres: Progressive pop; pop rock; hard rock; art rock
- Length: 44:22
- Label: Geffen
- Producer: Mike Stone

Asia chronology
Asia (1982)	Alpha (1983)

Singles from Asia
- 1. "Heat of the Moment" Released: April 1982; 2. "Only Time Will Tell" Released: July 1982; 3. "Sole Survivor" Released: October 1982

Alternative covers

Asia is the debut studio album by English rock supergroup Asia, released in 1982. According to both Billboard and Cashbox, it was the #1 album in the United States for the year 1982. It contains their biggest hit "Heat of the Moment", which reached #4 in the US on the Billboard Hot 100 chart.

== Recording ==
Asia included keyboardist Geoffrey Downes and guitarist Steve Howe from Yes; King Crimson singer-bassist John Wetton; and Emerson, Lake & Palmer drummer Carl Palmer.

"The production was a bit Journey-esque," Howe noted. "That was down to Mike Stone, who'd co-produced Escape, which was a huge album for Journey. But "Heat of the Moment" was the last song we recorded for the Asia album. By then we'd already done stuff like "Time Again" and "Wildest Dreams", which were very progressive. There was also this sweetness in "[Only] Time Will Tell". But as soon as I stacked up the guitar and John started singing, we knew we had something special in "Heat of the Moment"."

"People said, 'No, that's not going to work. It's all keyboards now. It's all synthesizers.' I think A Flock of Seagulls was No. 1," Wetton commented. "Actually, what we did was make a sound that blew synthesizers out of the water. Everyone said, 'Oh, no, no, no. A prog-guitar band ain't gonna work.' But it did."

The album's concluding track, "Here Comes the Feeling" (credited to Wetton and Howe) was a reworking of a song written by Wetton and recorded with French progressive rock band Atoll in 1979: the original version was released as a bonus track on Atoll's 1993 reissue of their 1979 album Rock Puzzle.

== Artwork ==
Asia's logo and cover artwork were created by Roger Dean, known for his work with Yes (of which guitarist Steve Howe and keyboard player Geoff Downes were previous members) and Uriah Heep (of which bassist/vocalist John Wetton had previously been a member). The debut album's art depicts an Asian dragon reaching to catch a pearl.

There was a concern that having Dean do the cover would produce something that looked too much like his famed artwork for Yes, but Howe and Downes pushed for his involvement. Geffen's John Kalodner did not initially like Dean's logo for the band.

== Critical reception ==
Professional ratings
Review scores
Source	Rating
AllMusic	4.5/5 stars
Christgau's Record Guide	C−

Robert Christgau blasted the album, and particularly its lyrics. He stated that it had been a rare occasion that "a big new group is bad enough to sink your teeth into any more" and called the album "pompous – schlock in the grand manner". Melody Maker's Adam Sweeting similarly lambasted the band: "Designed by computer, hand-built by robots...Completely calculated, thoroughly contemptible, Asia is every bit as hollow, shallow and nasty as anyone had a right to expect." On the other side, in a Billboard review, it was favourably noted that "the caliber of the [band's] playing is superb and the music sounds fresh and perfect fare for AOR".

In a retrospective review for AllMusic, Tom Demalon awarded Asia four-and-a-half out of five, saying that "there's no denying the epic grandeur of the music, which provided some much-needed muscle to radio at the time, and did so with style".

== Commercial performance ==
Upon its release in March 1982, Asia reached #1 in the US and spent nine weeks at the top of the Billboard album chart. Asia was certified 4×-platinum in the US by the RIAA on 10 February 1995. It was the best-selling album of 1982 in the US.

In the band's native UK, Asia did not perform as well as in the US, peaking only at #11 and spent a total of 38 weeks in the UK Albums Chart. The record received a gold status in Britain on 18 October 1982. "Heat of the Moment" climbed to No. 46.

Asia's total worldwide sales are estimated at over ten million copies.

== Track listing ==
Side one
No.	Title	Writer(s)	Length
1.	"Heat of the Moment"	John Wetton, Geoff Downes	3:48
2.	"Only Time Will Tell"	Wetton, Downes	4:44
3.	"Sole Survivor"	Wetton, Downes	4:48
4.	"One Step Closer"	Wetton, Steve Howe	4:16
5.	"Time Again"	Downes, Howe, Carl Palmer, Wetton	4:45

Side two
No.	Title	Writer(s)	Length
6.	"Wildest Dreams"	Wetton, Downes	5:10
7.	"Without You"	Wetton, Howe	5:04
8.	"Cutting It Fine"	Wetton, Downes, Howe	5:35
9.	"Here Comes the Feeling"	Wetton, Howe	5:42
Total length:			44:22

Bonus Track
No.	Title	Writer(s)	Length
10.	"Ride Easy"	Wetton, Howe	4:35
Total length:			48:57

Note: In 2010 Audio Fidelity released a 24 Karat Gold CD (AFZ 068) remaster of the album, mastered by Kevin Gray.

== Personnel ==
=== Asia ===
- John Wetton – lead vocals, bass guitar
- Geoff Downes – keyboards, vocals
- Steve Howe – guitars, vocals
- Carl Palmer – drums, percussion

=== Technical personnel ===
- Mike Stone – producer, engineer
- Roger Dean – cover design
- Brian Griffin – inner sleeve photography

== Charts ==
=== Weekly charts ===
Chart (1982–83)	Peak position
Australian Albums (Kent Music Report)	13
Austrian Albums (Ö3 Austria)	13
Canada Top Albums/CDs (RPM)	1
Dutch Albums (Album Top 100)	10
Finnish Albums (The Official Finnish Charts)	25
French Albums (SNEP)	9
German Albums (Offizielle Top 100)	6
Italian Albums (Musica e dischi)	19
Japanese Albums (Oricon)	15
New Zealand Albums (RMNZ)	17
Norwegian Albums (VG-lista)	4
Swedish Albums (Sverigetopplistan)	27
UK Albums (Official Charts)	11
US Billboard 200	1

=== Year-end charts ===
Chart (1982)	Position
Canada Top Albums/CDs (RPM)	5
Dutch Albums (Album Top 100)	68
German Albums (Offizielle Top 100)	17
UK Albums (OCC)	35
US Billboard 200	1

=== All-time chart ===
Chart	Position
US Billboard 200	95

== Sales and certifications ==
Region	Certification	Certified units/sales
Australia (ARIA)	Gold	20,000^{^}
Canada (Music Canada)	3× Platinum	300,000^{^}
France (SNEP)	Gold	100,000^{*}
Japan (RIAJ)	Platinum	200,000^{^}
Switzerland (IFPI Switzerland)	Gold	25,000^{^}
United Kingdom (BPI)	Gold	100,000^{^}
United States (RIAA)	4× Platinum	4,000,000^{^}
Yugoslavia	—	20,549
^{*} Sales figures based on certification alone.^{^} Shipments figures based on certification alone.
