= Heat of the Moment (Asia song) =

1982 single by Asia

- Cover of the European single

Single by Asia

from the album Asia
- B-side: "Ride Easy" (International); "Time Again" (UK)
- Released: April 1982 (US); June 1982 (UK)
- Genre: Pop rock; progressive rock; new wave
- Length: 3:50 (commercial 45 and album version); 3:25 (DJ single version)
- Label: Geffen
- Songwriters: John Wetton, Geoff Downes
- Producer: Mike Stone

Asia singles chronology
"Heat of the Moment" (1982)	"Only Time Will Tell" (1982)

Audio
- "Heat of the Moment" on YouTube

"Heat of the Moment" is the first single released by English rock supergroup Asia from their 1982 eponymous debut album. It was written by singer and bass guitarist John Wetton and keyboardist Geoff Downes. It was named by Lee Zimmerman of Paste as Asia's signature song.

== Background ==
Singer John Wetton said,

The lyrics are an abject apology for my dreadful behavior towards a particular woman (the woman I would eventually marry, but divorce 10 years later), the chorus began its life as a 6/8 country song, but when Geoff and I started writing together, we moved the time signatures around, and "Heat of the Moment" emerged. No-one else particularly "got" the song, and it was the last song to be recorded for the album. This was the case with the next two albums (that the last song recorded was to be the first single—I think it's because Geoff and I are very, very focused by the end of recording) with "Don't Cry" and "Go".

In 2026, Downes admitted that Phil Spector influenced the song: "That drumbeat with a fat snare with a tambourine, and Carl really embraced that idea. A bit inspired by Phil Spector, yeah."

== B-sides ==
"Time Again" is the B-side of the U.K. release. The song was written by all the band members, Geoff Downes, Steve Howe, Carl Palmer and John Wetton, and can also be found on the Asia album.

"Ride Easy" is the B-side of the singles released outside of the United Kingdom. This song was written by Wetton and Howe. It was never given a regular release on a studio album, but it was included in the EP Aurora (1986), released only in Japan. It was released on CD on The Very Best of Asia: Heat of the Moment (1982–1990) (2000).

== Development ==
"Heat of the Moment" was the last song recorded for the album. John Kalodner of Geffen asked the band for a single: Wetton had an idea for the chorus and Downes had an idea that made the verse and they wrote the song in an afternoon. The line "You catch a pearl and ride the dragon's wings" was inspired by Roger Dean's artwork for the album.

Howe overdubbed his Gibson Les Paul Junior playing the rhythm guitar power chords in the verses seven times, each through a different amplifier, to get the "grungy" sound he wanted. During the song's middle eight, he doubled Downes' synth lick with a koto.

== Reception ==
Billboard said that "this superstar quartet aims its soaring harmonies and tight arrangement at pop and beyond."

== Track listing ==
US 7" single

No.	Title	Length
1.	"Heat of the Moment"	3:50
2.	"Ride Easy"	4:35

UK 7" single

No.	Title	Length
1.	"Heat of the Moment"	3:50
2.	"Time Again"	4:45

== Personnel ==
- John Wetton – lead vocals, bass, backing vocals
- Geoff Downes – keyboards
- Steve Howe – guitar, koto,
- Carl Palmer – drums, percussion
- Mike Stone – producer, engineer

== Charts ==
"Heat of the Moment" reached No. 4 on both the Canadian singles chart and on the Billboard Hot 100 chart. The single climbed to the top position on the U.S. Billboard Mainstream Rock chart, achieving six non-consecutive weeks at No. 1 in the spring and summer of 1982.

=== Weekly charts ===
Chart (1982–1983)	Peak position
Australian Singles (Kent Music Report)	26
Canada Top Singles (RPM)	4
French Singles (SNEP)	39
Ireland (IRMA)	30
Japanese Singles (Oricon)	90
Netherlands (Dutch Top 40)	33
New Zealand (Recorded Music NZ)	46
Radio Luxemburg Singles	26
South African Singles Chart	4
Switzerland (Schweizer Hitparade)	2
UK Singles (Official Charts)	46
US Billboard Hot 100	4
US Mainstream Rock Airplay (Billboard)	1
West Germany (GfK)	7

=== Year-end charts ===
Chart (1982)	Peak position
Canada Top Singles (RPM)	47
US Billboard Hot 100	40
U.S. Cashbox Top 100	43
West Germany (Official German Charts	55

== In popular culture ==
- In the 2001 South Park episode "Kenny Dies", Eric Cartman sings the song during a speech to the House of Representatives on behalf of stem cell research.
- It appears in the 2001 film Lucky Girl character Kong played by Von Flores sings on a karaoke while welcoming guests.
- It appears in the 2005 film The 40-Year-Old Virgin.
- It appears in the 2005 film The Matador.
- It appears in the 2007 video game Guitar Hero: Rocks the 80's, as a cover version made by WaveGroup.
- It appears in the TV show Supernatural, episode "Mystery Spot".
- The song can be heard in the 2022 horror thriller film Barbarian, starring Georgina Campbell, Bill Skarsgård and Justin Long.
