= Max Bacon =

British rock singer

Max Bacon is an English rock singer. He was the lead singer for 1980s rock group GTR, as well as for Burn the Sky, Moby Dick, Nightwing, Phenomena, and Bronz. He was the vocalist on GTR's top 40 single, "When the Heart Rules the Mind" and their self-titled debut album.

Bacon's 1996 solo album The Higher You Climb included GTR material, and Bacon later sang lead on "Going, Going, Gone" on Steve Howe's 1999 release, Portraits of Bob Dylan.

Bacon sang lead on Mike Oldfield's 1987 album Islands which, in the U.S. version, featured the minor hit "Magic Touch", and was co-produced by Geoff Downes, who produced GTR. In 2002 another solo album, From the Banks of the River Irwell, was released, featuring some material composed by Downes previously performed by Asia during John Payne's tenure.

Bacon appeared as a contestant on ITV's talent show New Faces, hosted by Marti Caine with featured judges Chris Tarrant and Nina Myskow. Bacon reached the 1988 final and performed a version of "The Hunter" from GTR's debut album, but did not win.

Bacon subsequently left the music business and took ownership of a pub called The Crown in Knaresborough, North Yorkshire, England. He then went on to run The Wheatsheaf pub in the small town of Egremont in West Cumbria.

Bacon returned to his former band, Bronz, to play at the Hard Rock Hell Festival in Wales in November 2011.

For the last few years, he has lived in Spain and still performs occasionally.

He is featured on disc 3 of Steve Howe's second compilation album, Groups and Collaborations which was published in 2017, he is singing on five songs with Yes's guitarist.

== Discography ==
=== Moby Dick ===
- 1982: "Can't Have My Body Tonight" (single, Ebony Records)

=== Solo work ===
- 1995: The Higher You Climb (1995) With Geoff Downes, Steve Hackett, Steve Howe, Scott Gorham etc.
- 2002: From the Banks of the River Irwell - With Geoff Downes, Scott Gorham, Mike Oldfield, Phil Spalding, Mike Sturgis, etc.

=== Nightwing ===
- 1983 Stand Up and Be Counted
- 1984 My Kingdom Come

=== Bronz ===
- 1984: Taken by Storm

=== GTR ===
- 1986: GTR
- 1997: King Biscuit Flower Hour Presents GTR (Live)

=== Phenomena ===
- 1987: Dream Runner

=== Mike Oldfield ===
- 1987: Islands
- 1989: Earth Moving

=== Steve Howe ===
- 1999: Portraits of Bob Dylan
- 2017: Groups and Collaborations : Max Bacon vocals on Running In The Human Race, Hot touch, Runway, Forever and Tell the Story.
