= J. D. Considine =

American music critic (born 1957)

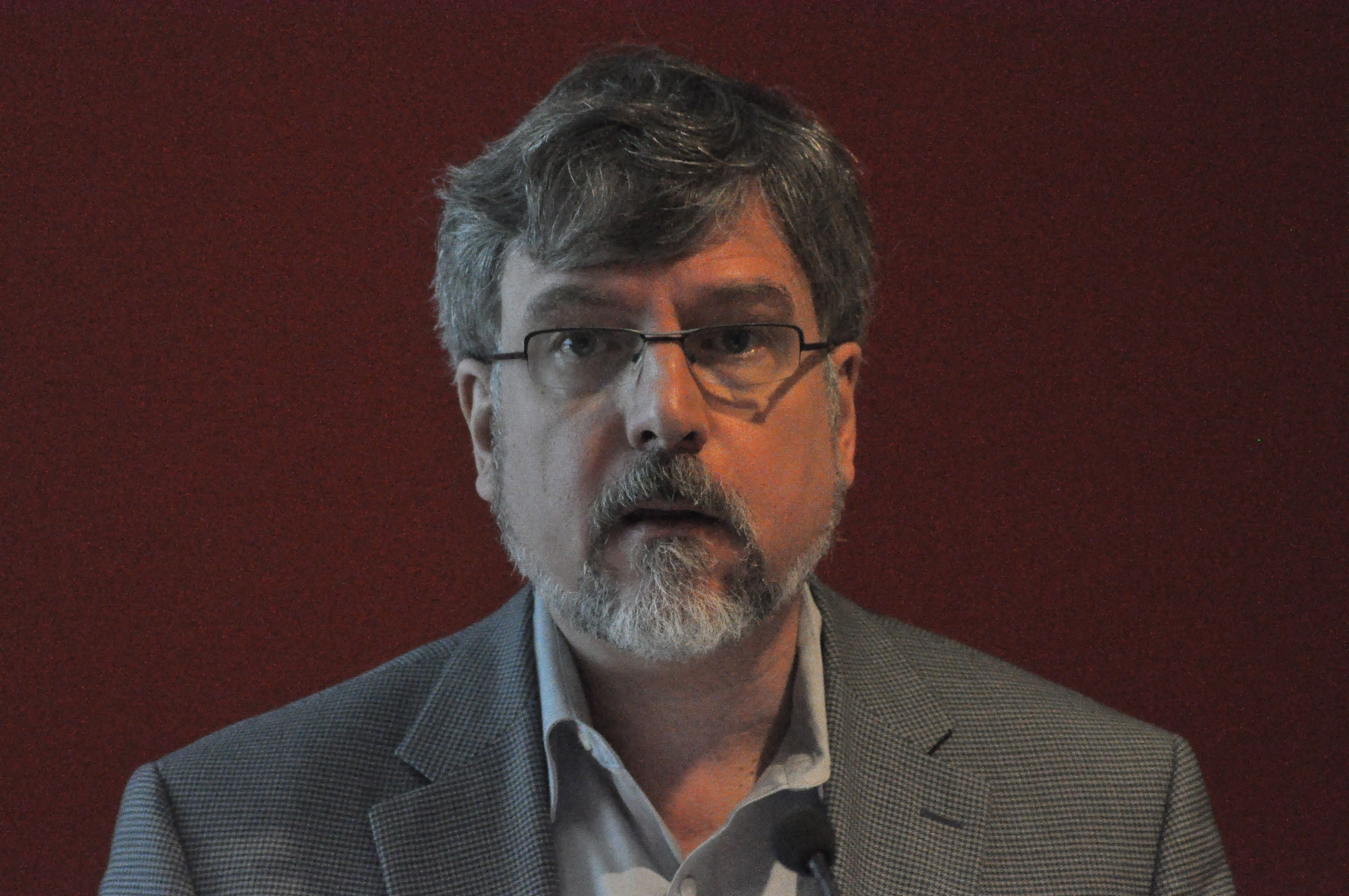
- Considine in 2010
- Born: John Dale Considine; 1957 (age 68–69); Albany, New York, U.S.
- Occupation: Music critic

John Dale Considine (born 1957) is an American music critic who has been writing about music professionally since 1977.

== Background ==
John Dale Considine was born in Albany, New York, in 1957. Considine moved to Towson, Maryland, at age five. After graduating from Towson High School, Considine completed a B.A. in humanities at Johns Hopkins University in 1979. J. D. Considine's work has been published in numerous newspapers and music magazines, and he has contributed to several books. Considine appeared regularly on the VH1 show Four on the Floor which aired from 1994 to 1996, and earned a Cable Ace nomination.

== Writing ==
From 1979 to 1996, Considine wrote for Rolling Stone. Considine was on the staff of The Baltimore Sun from 1986 to the end of 2000, leaving to become managing editor and a writer for Revolver magazine. He later became jazz critic at The Globe and Mail.

In the 1980s, Considine wrote for Musician. It was here that Considine coined the term "cowboy pop" in his review of Rubber Rodeo's 1984 album Scenic Views. In a 1990 review published in Rolling Stone, J. D. Considine famously criticized Phil Collins' album ...But Seriously, arguing that "Collins was a lot more fun — and effective — when he was frivolous." Seven months after the publication of the review, Phil Collins addressed Considine's claim directly in an interview published in Musician Magazine.

An especially famous review of Considine's was of GTR's self-titled debut album, GTR. His one-word review, "SHT", appeared in Musician magazine.
