= Don't Cry (Asia song) =

Single by Asia

from the album Alpha
- B-side: "Daylight" (US); "True Colors" (UK)
- Released: July 1983 (US); 5 August 1983 (UK)
- Genre: Progressive pop
- Length: 3:41 (album version); 3:25 (single version)
- Label: Geffen
- Songwriters: Geoff Downes; John Wetton
- Producer: Mike "Clay" Stone

Asia singles chronology
"Sole Survivor" (1982)	"Don't Cry" (1983)	"The Smile Has Left Your Eyes" (1983)

Alternative covers
- Japanese Edition

Music video
- "Don't Cry" on YouTube

"Don't Cry" is the first hit single from English rock supergroup Asia's second album Alpha. "Don't Cry" reached number 10 on the Billboard Hot 100 and number 9 in Cash Box magazine. It was the band's second top ten hit on the Billboard Hot 100 and returned them to number 1 on Billboard's Top Album Rock Tracks chart.

== Track listing ==
US 7" single

No.	Title	Length
1.	"Don't Cry"	3:25
2.	"Daylight"	3:53

UK 7" single

No.	Title	Length
1.	"Don't Cry"	3:25
3.	"True Colors"	3:53

UK 12" single

No.	Title	Length
1.	"Don't Cry"	3:25
2.	"Daylight"	3:31
3.	"True Colors"	3:53

== Personnel ==
- John Wetton – bass guitar, vocals
- Geoff Downes – keyboards
- Steve Howe – guitars
- Carl Palmer – drums, tambourine

== Charts ==
Chart (1983)	Peak position
Canada Top Singles (RPM)	10
French Singles(SNEP)	60
Ireland (IRMA)	23
Japanese Singles (Oricon)	76
Radio Luxemburg Singles	17
UK Singles (Official Charts)	33
US Billboard Hot 100	10
US Mainstream Rock Airplay (Billboard)	1
West Germany (GfK)	50
