= GTR (band) =

English rock supergroup (1985–1987)

- GTR, 1986. L-R: Phil Spalding, Steve Hackett, Jonathan Mover, Steve Howe, and Max Bacon.

Background information
- Origin: Westminster, London, England
- Genres: Progressive rock; AOR
- Years active: 1985–1987
- Labels: Arista, King Biscuit
- Past members: Max Bacon; Steve Hackett; Steve Howe; Jonathan Mover; Phil Spalding; Matt Clifford; Robert Berry; Nigel Glockler

GTR were an English rock supergroup founded in 1985 by former Yes and Asia guitarist Steve Howe and former Genesis guitarist Steve Hackett. Though the band's leaders were known as progressive rock musicians, GTR appealed to AOR radio stations. The band lasted for two years and one album. Hackett subsequently criticized the project, though not necessarily the other musicians involved in it.

The band's name came from an abbreviation of "guitar" used by recording studios for labelling guitar tracks.

== History ==
After Steve Howe left Asia in 1984, he and former Yes manager Brian Lane discussed forming a new group, and Lane approached former Genesis guitarist Steve Hackett. Hackett's last few solo albums had sold disappointingly, and he hoped GTR would sustain his prominence as a guitarist and finance future solo work. They recruited American drummer Jonathan Mover (ex-Marillion), bass guitarist Phil Spalding, and singer Max Bacon.

GTR sought to create a contemporary band sound without using keyboards, which Howe felt had become too dominant in Asia. Instead, Hackett and Howe's guitars were outfitted with Roland guitar synthesizer pickups, which operated rack synthesizers.

While Brian Lane pursued record deals (initially, without much success), the band set about recording songs with Howe’s former Asia and Yes colleague Geoff Downes as producer. Howe and Hackett disagreed on method: whereas Howe favored investment in high-quality studio time, Hackett preferred a relatively low-budget recording approach but greater investment in instruments and technology. Howe's approach prevailed and proved expensive, leaving the group uncomfortably in debt. Hackett would later criticise Lane's work as manager, accusing him of following a "divide and conquer" approach to ensure that the band would be in dissension and agree to the final deal secured by Lane to recoup the time and money invested.

=== Album ===
GTR's self-titled debut album was released by Arista Records on 24 April 1986. In the U.S., the album went gold, hit No. 11 on the album charts, and spawned a hit single, "When the Heart Rules the Mind" (No. 14), which stayed in the charts for 16 weeks. Another single, "The Hunter", received some video coverage and modest airplay, peaking at No. 85. While the album was a chart success, it was (and has remained) a work with a mixed and highly debated reputation among rock fans, especially supporters of Genesis and Yes. Some said the album contained substandard filler material beyond the two singles, and there was some criticism directed at Max Bacon's strident tenor. J. D. Considine's infamous review of the album (in Musician magazine) consisted of only one word: "SHT". (Considine later said it was the most famous thing he'd ever written in his three decades as a critic, while Hackett stated the review actually helped sales of the album.)

=== Tour ===
"I always felt that something like GTR had novelty value. As soon as people start mentioning the word 'Super Group', it basically has novelty value for one album. I suspect that no one was really that surprised that Steve and I, although we are very good friends these days, didn't ride off into the sunset together making albums for infinity."

— Steve Hackett, 2001

GTR toured North America and Europe in 1986. Live rehearsals revealed that the band's "no keyboards" method did not work in concert due to the poor tracking qualities of the guitar synthesizers, and therefore the tour featured keyboard player Matt Clifford in the GTR lineup in order to recreate the studio sound. Songs in the setlist included Genesis and Yes material as well as songs from Hackett and Howe's solo albums. Howe, Hackett and Bacon also appeared as guest VJs on MTV's "Guest VJ Hour" in the summer. A show at the Wiltern Theater in Los Angeles recorded for the King Biscuit Flower Hour radio show (and later released on album) demonstrated that the group was extremely tight and well-practiced live. Tracks played included versions of Yes's "Roundabout" and a re-working of the Genesis classic "I Know What I Like" as well as pieces from Hackett's and Howe's solo LPs. A preview of a new song, "Prizefighters", was included in this collection. The song was later developed for Hackett's planned 1986 solo release Feedback 86, which eventually appeared in 2000.

=== Decline and legacy ===
According to Hackett, by the end of the tour the band was falling apart, and his dissatisfaction with both the music and financial management of GTR (as well as a failure to see eye-to-eye with Howe) led to his beginning to question the project. He later commented "it looked like either Steve Howe or I might jump ship with GTR, and I think the possibility of it being an on-going entity was mooted ... At the time, I saw GTR as becoming more of a project than a band. Perhaps the idea of a number of guitarists all getting together." With this in mind, Hackett approached guitarist Brian May of Queen with the suggestion that he join the project. Despite May's initial enthusiasm, the potential collaboration only extended to three tracks demoed with Hackett, and it is unclear whether Hackett ultimately intended May to replace himself or replace Howe.

The band's debt situation had not improved and in 1987 Hackett called time on the group. He recalled that "to create or maintain that level of success, the band was functioning on an extremely insecure footing financially. Someone had to be the bad guy and say, 'I'm calling an extraordinary general meeting and closing down the company.' Which is what I did, because we had far too many money issues to be able to continue." Hackett then left GTR, stating it had been "interesting for about five minutes", and resumed his solo career. Later, he would reflect "Yes, we had a firm deal and I could have perhaps done it for life, but frankly, I prefer my albums to be more spontaneous and creatively free ... There are artistic limitations with any successful band, and it was a successful band." Mover also left GTR, going on to play in Joe Satriani's band.

Unwilling to give up on the band, Steve Howe tried to continue GTR with Bacon, Spalding, ex-Saxon drummer Nigel Glockler (who had worked for Toyah with Spalding) and a second singer/guitarist, former Hush member Robert Berry. A bootleg recording of initial sessions (titled Nerotrend, which was also a new name suggested for the band) shows that half of the band's music was now sung by Berry and half by Bacon. Both sessions and band were ultimately abandoned, with some of the material later resurrected or reused on future albums by group members (including the song "This World Is Big Enough for All of Us", which became "Birthright" on the Anderson Bruford Wakeman Howe album).

Post-GTR, Steve Howe resumed his solo career and rejoined the Yes lineup (initially as part of Anderson Bruford Wakeman Howe) while Robert Berry became part of the partial Emerson, Lake & Palmer reunion project 3. Phil Spalding returned to a session career and Nigel Glockler returned to Saxon. Max Bacon's 1996 solo album The Higher You Climb included GTR material, and he later sang lead on "Going, Going, Gone" on Howe's 1999 release, Portraits of Bob Dylan. In 2018, Hackett released a re-recorded version of "When the Heart Rules the Mind" as a single.

== Band members ==
=== Original members ===
- Steve Howe – guitar, backing vocals (1985–1987)
- Steve Hackett – guitar, backing vocals (1985–1986)
- Max Bacon – lead vocals (1985–1987)
- Phil Spalding – bass, backing vocals (1985–1987; died 2023)
- Jonathan Mover – drums, percussion (1985–1986)

=== Later members ===
- Matt Clifford – keyboards (1986–1987)
- Robert Berry – guitar, backing and lead vocals (1987)
- Nigel Glockler – drums (1987)

== Discography ==
=== Studio albums ===
- GTR (1986) - US No. 11; UK No. 41; CAN No. 30

=== Live albums ===
- King Biscuit Flower Hour Presents GTR (recorded 1986, released 1997)

=== Videos ===
- The Making of GTR (1986)
- Live (filmed 1986, released 2008)

=== Singles ===
Year	Song	US Hot 100	US Rock	UK Singles	Canada (RPM)	Album
1986	"When the Heart Rules the Mind"	14	3	82	62	GTR
1986	"The Hunter"	85	14	-	-	GTR
