= Geoff Downes =

English keyboardist (born 1952)

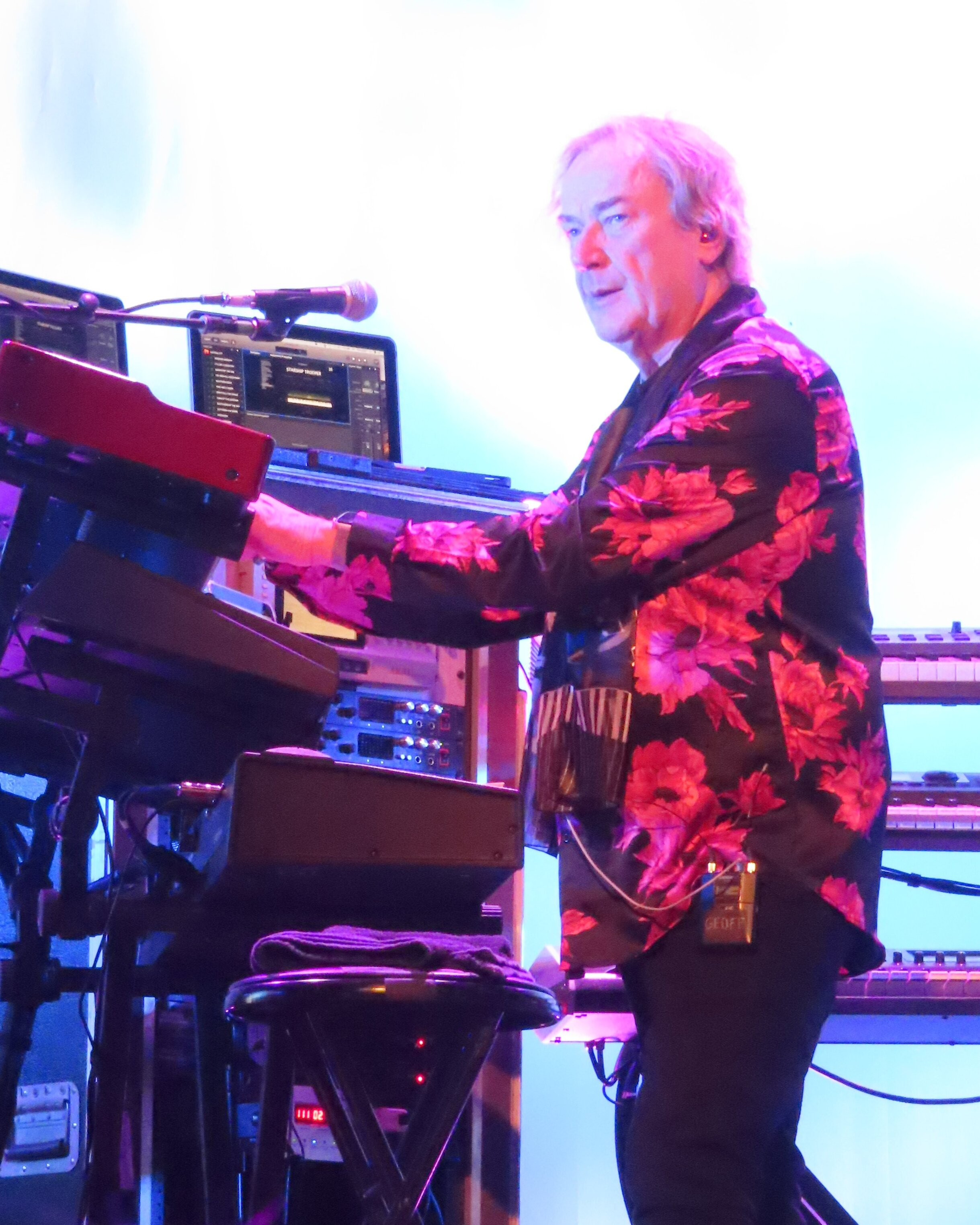
- Downes performing with Yes in 2024

Background information
- Born: Geoffrey Downes; 25 August 1952 (age 74); Stockport, Cheshire, England
- Genres: Progressive rock; hard rock; space rock; new wave; electronic rock
- Occupations: Musician; songwriter; producer
- Instrument: Keyboards
- Years active: 1974–present
- Labels: EMI America; Frontiers; Geffen; Universal
- Member of: Yes; Asia; DBA (Downes Braide Association)
- Formerly of: The Buggles; Trapeze; White; New Dance Orchestra; Icon
- Website: geoffdownes.com

Geoffrey Downes (born 25 August 1952) is an English keyboardist who gained fame as a member of the new wave group the Buggles with Trevor Horn, the progressive rock band Yes, and the supergroup Asia.

Born in Stockport, Downes moved to London to pursue a music career. In 1977, he formed the Buggles with Horn and enjoyed success with their first album The Age of Plastic (1980) which included the worldwide hit single "Video Killed the Radio Star". In May 1980, Downes joined Yes with Horn and recorded Drama (1980). After Yes disbanded in 1981, Downes helped Trevor Horn to produce a second Buggles album, Adventures in Modern Recording (1981) although he was only primarily involved for half of it, and co-founded Asia with fellow ex-Yes musician Steve Howe. He left Asia in 1986, rejoined in 1990, and has been a part of the lineup since then; he released several solo albums and produced for several artists, including Mike Oldfield and the Thompson Twins.

In 2006, Downes reunited the original Asia lineup and rejoined Yes in 2011; he is currently a member of both groups. Since 1998, he has reunited with Horn on special occasions to perform songs from the Buggles. Downes entered the Guinness Book of Records for performing with a record 28 keyboards on stage in a single performance.

== Early life ==
Downes was born at Stepping Hill Hospital in Stockport, Cheshire, the son of musical parents. His father was a church organist and his mother a pianist. He also took up the keyboards and played in a succession of local bands. He attended Stockport Grammar School before studying at Leeds College of Music. After graduating he moved to London, where he played sessions and composed advertising jingles.

== Career ==
=== Early career, the Buggles, and Yes (1975–1981) ===
In the mid-1970s, Downes was a member of She's French, playing a Fender Rhodes electric piano and a Hammond organ. The band also included Jamie West-Oram on guitar and Hoagy Davies, the son of Rupert Davies, on Minimoog synthesizer. He played keyboards for a theatre production of The Wombles in 1975. He played in Gary Boyle's band Isotope in 1977.

In 1976, Downes met Trevor Horn while auditioning for pop singer Tina Charles' backing band, for which Horn produced a single called Don't come back in 1977, which was published under the name "Fallen Angel and the Tina Charles Band". Then they formed the short-lived Chromium, with Anne Dudley and Hans Zimmer and recorded an album Star to Star in 1978. Then they continued to work together, eventually forming the Buggles, recording a worldwide hit single "Video Killed the Radio Star" in 1979. It was Island Records' first number 1 in the UK, and the video of the song subsequently became the first ever to be played at the launch of MTV on 1 August 1981.

The success of the Buggles led to Downes and Horn joining Yes for the Drama album and the associated tour in 1980. Downes was the first member of the band to have completed a music degree.

=== Asia and other projects (1981–2006) ===
Yes split at the beginning of 1981, and Downes subsequently joined forces with guitarist Steve Howe (from Yes), bassist/vocalist John Wetton (from King Crimson) and drummer Carl Palmer (from Emerson, Lake & Palmer) to form Asia. Despite being out of the band between 1989 and 1990, Downes is the longest-serving member of the band and the only one to appear on every album released by them. Asia was an immediate worldwide success upon the recording of "Heat of the Moment" and the release of their self-titled debut album in 1982; the album remained at number 1 on the Billboard album charts for a record 9 successive weeks.

In 1989, Downes was involved in the remake of Deep Purple's 1972 song "Smoke on the Water" to raise funds for the Spitak earthquake victims. In 2009, Downes along with Tony Iommi, Ian Gillan and the former Wimbledon tennis champion Pat Cash, went to Armenia, and were presented with state medals from the President of Armenia for their efforts in the Rock Aid Armenia project.

In addition to recording and touring with Asia through more than three decades, Downes has also recorded a number of solo albums and collaborated with many other artists such as former bandmate John Wetton, former Deep Purple Glenn Hughes and Trapeze for a tour that produced the live album Welcome to the Real World, Ride the Tiger with Greg Lake, and a brief appearance on Kate Bush's "Sat in Your Lap". In 2005, he joined Yes drummer Alan White's eponymous band, White, on their debut album.

Downes has continued to release sporadic solo albums over the years, mainly under the name The New Dance Orchestra. They include the critically acclaimed 1986 double album The Light Programme, in addition to Vox Humana (1992), Shadows & Reflections (2003), along with a few others. He performed a sold out one-man show in 2003 at St Cyprian's Church in London, which was recorded using ambisonics technology.

He has also worked extensively as a producer with such acts as Mike Oldfield, Thompson Twins and GTR. As a songwriter, he has written for Agnetha Fältskog of ABBA. He is also credited as a co-writer on Anderson Bruford Wakeman Howe album (made up of former members of Yes in 1989); he is credited due to Howe re-using some musical ideas from Asia.

In recent years, Downes has teamed up with Wetton in a separate project under the name Icon. They have released three studio albums: Icon (2005), Icon II: Rubicon (2006), and Icon 3 (2009) and live album from their 2005 tour.

=== Reformed Asia, projects, and return to Yes (2006–present) ===
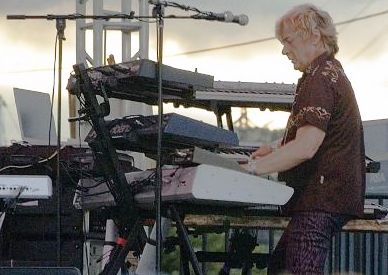
Downes performing with Asia, 2006

In 2006, Downes reunited with the original members of Asia for a series of tours that continued into 2008, releasing a new album of studio material, Phoenix (2008), with more shows performed through Spring 2009. Later in 2009, the original Asia toured the US supporting Yes, with him and guitarist Steve Howe doing double duty performing with both bands nightly.

In the autumn of 2009 the band went into the studio again to record another album. The Asia album Omega was released in April 2010, the band has embarked on a six-week US tour through August and September. A song, "Extraordinary Life" from their previous album, Phoenix (2008), was chosen as the trailer for US's biggest reality TV show America's Got Talent. Since 2011, Downes shares his time between YES and Asia, touring and recording with both bands.

In 2012, Downes teamed up with Chris Braide under the name DBA (Downes Braide Association). The result was an album, Pictures of You, released summer 2012 on Plane Groovy Records. Since then, they have released five more studio recordings (Suburban Ghosts in 2015, Skyscraper Souls in 2017, Halcyon Hymns in 2021, Celestial Songs in 2023, and Trauma in 2026), and a live album (Live in England in 2019).

While active with the original Asia, he has also finished three albums with Wetton on their side project Icon, and recorded a live DVD in 2009 to promote the release of their third studio album. The project included guitarist Dave Kilminster, Pete Riley, and Hugh McDowell. In addition, Downes is also working on television, film and production music for a London West End film production company, Original Production Music Ltd.

He released a further New Dance Orchestra (NDO) album in 2010 entitled Electronica with vocals from Anne-Marie Helder. It features Downes' orchestral style of keyboard playing.

On 28 September 2010, he reunited with Bruce Woolley and Trevor Horn as the band the Buggles, performing "The Lost Gig" to raise funds for the Royal Hospital for Neuro-disability.

On 22 March 2011, he performed at the Roundhouse, London with Trevor Horn and Producers, along with Spandau Ballet and Alison Moyet to raise funds for a music charity for underprivileged children. The event raised over half a million pounds on the night.

On 31 March 2011, he was confirmed as participating in the recording of the new Yes album Fly from Here (2011), reuniting with them formally for the first time since 1980 and rejoining the band for an upcoming tour. In May 2011, he rejoined Yes as the full-time keyboard player. In 2012, the band appointed a replacement vocalist, Jon Davison. The new Yes album, Heaven & Earth was released in July 2014.

Downes has also worked with Asia on a 30th Anniversary album, XXX, released in 2012. Downes co-composed 7 of the 9 original compositions on the album with Wetton, and the remaining two with Wetton and Howe.

== Influences and style ==
In an interview conducted December 2006, Downes said the three players who had inspired him were Rick Wakeman (Yes), Keith Emerson (Emerson, Lake & Palmer) and especially Dave Sinclair (Caravan). In the same interview, he identified his favourite Asia tracks as "Only Time Will Tell", "Wildest Dreams", "Open Your Eyes" and "Voice of America". In an August 2015 interview, Downes said his favourite British band is King Crimson, with Journey, Kansas and Foreigner as his favourite American bands.

Asked on Twitter in 2018 which album in his career he is most proud of, Downes replied, "Drama – no doubt."

== Personal life ==
Downes has been married three times and divorced twice. He has two daughters, Christina and Alexandra (died 2013), from his first wife, Norwegian former model Wenche Steen, who was Miss Norway in 1973.

Downes lives in South Wales with his third wife Martine and step-son Louis. He is a supporter of the football club Cardiff City.

== Discography ==
=== Solo ===
- The Light Program (the New Dance Orchestra) (1987, Geffen)
- Vox Humana (the New Dance Orchestra) (1992, JIMCO/Blueprint Records)
- Evolution (1996, Blueprint Records)
- The World Service (the New Dance Orchestra) (1999, Blueprint Records)
- Shadows & Reflections (2003, Voiceprint Records)
- The Bridge (the New Dance Orchestra) (2006, Blueprint Records)
- Electronica (New Dance Orchestra ft Anne-Marie Helder) (2010)

=== Chromium ===
- Star to Star (1979)

=== Yes ===
Studio albums

- Drama (1980)
- Fly from Here (2011)
- Heaven & Earth (2014)
- The Quest (2021)
- Mirror to the Sky (2023)
- Aurora (2026)

Live albums

- The Word Is Live (tracks taken from the 1980 tour) (2005)
- Like It Is: Yes at the Bristol Hippodrome (2014)
- Like It Is: Yes at the Mesa Arts Center (2015)
- Topographic Drama - Live Across America (2017)
- Yes 50 Live (2019)
- The Royal Affair Tour: Live from Las Vegas (2020)

=== Trapeze ===
- Welcome to the Real World (live, 1993)

=== With John Wetton ===
Studio albums

- Wetton Downes (1996, demo)
- Wetton Downes (2001) (re-released and remastered in 2017 as Icon Zero)
- Icon (2005)
- Icon: Heat of the Moment 05 (2005, EP)
- Icon II: Rubicon (2006)
- Icon 3 (2009)

Live albums

- Icon Acoustic TV Broadcast (2006, Frontiers Records)
- Icon Live – Never in a Million Years (2006, Frontiers Records)
- Icon: Heat of the Rising Sun (2012)
- Icon: Urban Psalm Live (2017)

=== With Glenn Hughes ===
- The Work Tapes (1998, demo)

=== White ===
- White (2006)

=== Downes Braide Association (DBA) ===
Studio albums

- Pictures of You (2012)
- Suburban Ghosts (2015)
- Skyscraper Souls (2017)
- Halcyon Hymns (2021)
- Celestial Songs (2023)
- Trauma (2026)

Live albums

- Live in England (2019)

=== Deckchair Poets/Zorbonauts/Zebras Don't Smoke ===
- Deckchair Poets – Who Needs Pyjamas? (2013)
- Deckchair Poets – Searchin' for a Lemon Squeezer (2015)
- Deckchair Poets – A Bit of Pottery (2019)
- Zorbonauts – Tall Tails (2019)
- Deckchair Poets – Always Piste at Christmas (2019)
- Zorbonauts – The Unobserved Beaver (2020)
- Zebras Don't Smoke – Don't Mention the Swedes (2020)
- Deckchair Poets – The Crop Circlers' Guide to Abstract Expressionism (2021)
- Zorbonauts – Armed Slobbery (2021)
- Deckchair Poets – Be My Pillow (2022)
- Zebras Don't Smoke – Inflatable Noise (2022)

=== With Greg Lake ===
- Ride the Tiger (2015)

=== Other appearances ===
- 5000 Volts – 5000 Volts (1976)
- John Howard – "I Can Breathe Again" / "You Take My Breath Away" (single, 1978)
- John Howard – "Don't Shine Your Light" / "Baby Go Now" (double A-side, 1979)
- Kate Bush – The Dreaming (1982)
- Agnetha Faltskog – Eyes of a Woman (1985)
- GTR – GTR (1986) (producer)
- Thompson Twins – "Nothing in Common" (single, 1986) (producer)
- Mike Oldfield – Islands (1987) (co-producer)
- Rock Aid Armenia – The Earthquake Album (1990)
- Max Bacon – The Higher You Climb (1995)
- various artists – Encores, Legends, and Paradox, A Tribute to the Music of ELP (1999)
- Steve Howe – Portraits of Bob Dylan (1999)
- Squeezebox – Drowning in Shallow Water (2003)
- John Wetton – Rock of Faith (2003)
- Isotope and Gary Boyle – Live at the BBC (2004), archival release
- Starwood – If It Ain't Broke, Break It! (2004)
- Steve Thorne – Emotional Creatures: Part One (2005)
- various artists – Back Against the Wall (2005)
- various artists – Return to the Dark Side of the Moon (2006)
- various artists – Led Box: The Ultimate Tribute to Led Zeppelin (2008)
- various artists – Abbey Road: A Tribute to The Beatles (2009)
- Steve Howe – Homebrew 4 (2009)
- Jerusalem – Escalator (2009)
- John Wetton – Raised in Captivity (2011)
- Producers – Made in Basing Street (2012)
- The Prog Collective – The Prog Collective (2012)
- Nektar – A Spoonful of Time (2012)
- The Prog Collective – Epilogue (2013)
- various artists – Light My Fire: A Classic Rock Salute to The Doors (2014)
- Billy Idol – Kings & Queens of the Underground (2014)
- Jerusalem – Black Horses (2014)
- DuskMachine – DuskMachine (2014)
- Billy Sherwood – Citizen (2015)
- Jerusalem – Cooler Than Antarctica (2016)
- various artists – Action Moves People United (2016)
- Chrysta Bell – We Dissolve (2017)
- Sonic Elements – Yesterday and Today – A 50th Anniversary Tribute to Yes (2018)
- David Cross and Peter Banks – Crossover (2020)
- various artists – A Tribute to Keith Emerson & Greg Lake (2020)
- The Prog Collective – Worlds on Hold (2020)
- various artists – Still Wish You Were Here: A Tribute to Pink Floyd (2021)
- The Prog Collective – Songs We were Taught (2022)
