= Creed discography =

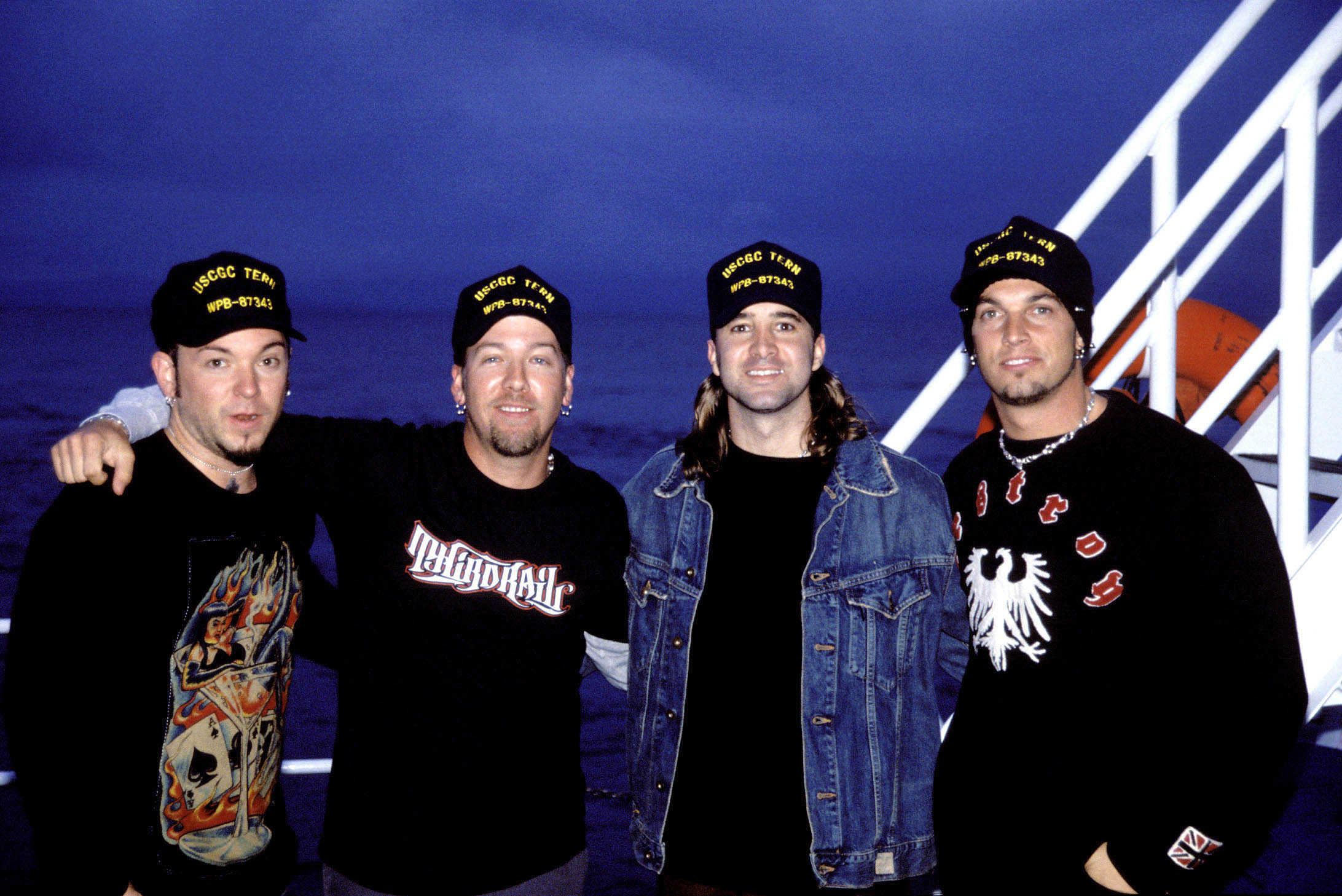
- Creed in 2002
- Studio albums: 4
- Extended plays: 1
- Live albums: 1
- Compilation albums: 4
- Singles: 18
- Video albums: 1
- Music videos: 16

American post-grunge band Creed has released four studio albums, one live album, four compilation albums, one extended play (EP), eighteen singles, one video album and sixteen music videos. Formed in Tallahassee, Florida in 1994, Creed consists of vocalist Scott Stapp, guitarist and vocalist Mark Tremonti, bassist Brian Marshall, and drummer Scott Phillips. The band released its debut album My Own Prison in April 1997. Signed to Wind-up Records, the band released its re-released album My Own Prison in August 1997, which reached number 22 on the US Billboard 200. The album was certified six times platinum by the Recording Industry Association of America (RIAA). All four singles from the album reached the top three of the US Billboard Mainstream Rock chart.

The group released its second album Human Clay in September 1999, which topped the US Billboard 200 and sold over 11 million units in the US. The album also topped the Canadian Albums Chart, as well as spawning four Mainstream Rock top-five singles, two of which ("Higher" and "With Arms Wide Open") reached number one. "With Arms Wide Open" also topped the Billboard Hot 100. Creed topped the Billboard 200 again with the release of Weathered in November 2001, which was certified six times platinum by the RIAA. The lead single "My Sacrifice" topped the Mainstream Rock chart and reached number four on the Hot 100, before "One Last Breath" reached the top ten on both charts.

In June 2004, it was announced that Creed had broken up due to tensions between Stapp and the other members, primarily Tremonti. Tremonti, Marshall, and Phillips formed the band Alter Bridge during that year with vocalist Myles Kennedy. In November 2004, Wind-up issued the Greatest Hits compilation, which reached number 15 on the Billboard 200. Five years later, the band reunited for a new album and tour. The album, Full Circle, was released in October 2009 and reached number two on the Billboard 200, supported by Mainstream Rock and Alternative Songs top-ten single "Overcome". In December 2009, the band's live video album Creed Live was released.

Creed broke up again in 2013, with Tremonti commenting in 2014 that there were "no plans" to reconnect with Stapp. The band's second compilation album, With Arms Wide Open: A Retrospective, was released in November 2015. Creed reunited once more in 2023 but have not released any new material since Full Circle.

== Albums ==
=== Studio albums ===
List of studio albums, with selected chart positions and certifications
Title	Album details	Peak chart positions										Sales	Certifications
Title	Album details	US	AUS	AUT	CAN	GER	NOR	NZ	SWE	SWI	UK	Sales	Certifications
My Own Prison	Released: April 14, 1997; Re-released: August 26, 1997; Label: Blue Collar Records (original), Wind-up (re-release); Format: CD	22	75	14	13	50	—	1	—	49	—	US: 6,000,000	RIAA: 6× Platinum; MC: 3× Platinum; RMNZ: 3× Platinum
Human Clay	Released: September 28, 1999; Label: Wind-up; Format: CD, LP, CS	1	2	11	1	9	1	4	9	35	29	US: 11,690,000	RIAA: 11× Platinum; ARIA: 4× Platinum; BPI: Gold; BVMI: Gold; MC: 6× Platinum; RMNZ: 5× Platinum
Weathered	Released: November 20, 2001; Label: Wind-up; Format: CD, CS	1	3	8	3	8	23	4	13	20	44		RIAA: 6× Platinum; ARIA: 2× Platinum; BPI: Platinum; BVMI: Gold; MC: 3× Platinum; RMNZ: 2× Platinum
Full Circle	Released: October 27, 2009; Label: Wind-up; Format: CD, CD+DVD, DL	2	27	12	8	9	—	16	56	7	78		
"—" denotes a release that did not chart or was not issued in that region.

=== Compilation albums ===
List of compilation albums, with selected chart positions and certifications
Title	Album details	Peak chart positions										Certifications
Title	Album details	US	US Cat.	US Digi.	AUS	AUT	GER	IRL	NZ	SWI	UK Rock	Certifications
Greatest Hits	Released: November 22, 2004; Label: Wind-up; Format: CD, CD+DVD	15	4	15	26	29	86	55	2	64	12	RIAA: 2× Platinum; ARIA: Gold; BPI: Gold; MC: Gold; RMNZ: 2× Platinum
With Arms Wide Open: A Retrospective	Released: November 20, 2015; Label: The Bicycle Music Company; Format: 3CD	—	—	—	—	—	—	—	—	—	—	
Stadium Anthems	Released: October 21, 2023; Label: UMG Recordings; Format: Streaming	—	—	—	—	—	—	—	—	—	—	
The Best of Creed	Released: September 23, 2025; Label: Craft Recordings; Format: CD, LP, DL	103	—	—	—	—	—	—	17	—	—	
"—" denotes a release that did not chart or was not issued in that region.

=== Live albums ===
Title	Album details	Peak chart positions		
Title	Album details	US	AUS	JPN
Live in San Antonio	Released: November 28, 2025; Label: Craft Recordings; Format: 2 x LP			

== Extended plays ==
List of extended plays
Title	EP details
Higher	Released: 1999; Label: Wind-up; Format: CD

== Singles ==
List of singles, with selected chart positions, showing year released and album name
Title	Year	Peak chart positions										Certifications	Album
Title	Year	US	US Alt.	US Main.	AUS	CAN	GER	IRL	NLD	NZ	UK	Certifications	Album
"My Own Prison"	1997	— (Note: "My Own Prison" did not enter the Billboard Hot 100, but peaked at number 54 on the Hot 100 Airplay chart.)	7	2	—	45	—	—	—	—	—	RMNZ: Gold	My Own Prison
"Torn"	1998	—	—	3	—	—	—	—	—	—	—		My Own Prison
"What's This Life For"	1998	—	10	1	—	—	—	—	—	—	—		My Own Prison
"One"	1998	70	2	2	—	39	—	—	—	—	—	RMNZ: Gold	My Own Prison
"Higher"	1999	7	1	1	36	—	91	—	64	—	47	RIAA: 2× Platinum; BPI: Silver; RMNZ: 2× Platinum	Human Clay
"What If"	2000	— (Note: "What If" did not enter the Billboard Hot 100, but peaked at number two on the Bubbling Under Hot 100 chart.)	15	3	—	—	—	—	—	—	—		Human Clay
"With Arms Wide Open"	2000	1	2	1	4	2	42	40	75	10	13	RIAA: 2× Platinum; ARIA: 2× Platinum; RMNZ: 2× Platinum	Human Clay
"Are You Ready?"	2000	—	37	4	—	—	—	—	—	—	—		Human Clay
"Riders on the Storm"	2000	—	—	28	—	—	—	—	—	—	—		Stoned Immaculate: The Music of the Doors
"My Sacrifice"	2001	4	2	1	11	7	79	15	44	16	18	RIAA: 2× Platinum; ARIA: Gold; BPI: Silver; RMNZ: 2× Platinum	Weathered
"Bullets"	2002	—	27	11	—	—	—	—	—	—	47 (Note: In the United Kingdom, "One Last Breath" and "Bullets" were released together as a double A-side single.)		Weathered
"One Last Breath"	2002	6	17	5	43	1	89	41	—	29	47	RIAA: 2× Platinum; BPI: Gold; RMNZ: 4× Platinum	Weathered
"Hide"	2002	—	—	—	65	—	—	—	—	—	—		Weathered
"Don't Stop Dancing"	2002	—	—	—	48	12	—	—	—	—	—		Weathered
"Weathered"	2002	—	30	7	—	—	—	—	—	—	—		Weathered
"Overcome"	2009	73	22	4	—	—	—	—	—	—	—		Full Circle
"Rain"	2009	91	—	—	52	—	—	—	—	—	—		Full Circle
"A Thousand Faces"	2010	—	—	23	—	—	—	—	—	—	—		Full Circle
"—" denotes a release that did not chart or was not issued in that region.

== Videos ==
=== Video albums ===
List of video albums, with selected chart positions and certifications
Title	Album details	Peak	Certifications
Title	Album details	UK	Certifications
Creed Live	Released: December 8, 2009; Label: Wind-up; Format: DVD	43	MC: Gold

=== Music videos ===
List of music videos, showing year released and director(s)
Title	Year	Director(s)	Ref.
"My Own Prison"	1997	Stephen Scott	
"Torn"	1998	unknown	
"What's This Life For" (version 1)	1998	Ramaa Mosley	
"What's This Life For" (version 2)	1998	Ramaa Mosley	
"What's This Life For" (version 3)	1998	Ramaa Mosley	
"Higher"	1999	Ramaa Mosley	
"What If"	1999	David Meyers	
"With Arms Wide Open"	2000	David Meyers	
"My Sacrifice"	2001	David Meyers	
"Bullets"	2002	Vision Scape Interactive	
"One Last Breath"	2002	David Meyers	
"Don't Stop Dancing"	2002	David Meyers, Scott Stapp	
"Overcome"	2009	Daniel Catullo	
"Rain"	2009	Gavin Bowden	
"A Thousand Faces"	2010	unknown	
"Are You Ready?"	2024	Dan Sturgess	

== Other appearances ==
List of other appearances, showing year released and album name
Title	Year	Album	Ref.
"Bound and Tied"	1998	Dead Man on Campus	
"I'm Eighteen"	1998	The Faculty	
"Wrong Way"	1999	End of Days	
"Is This the End" (Note: The Scream 3 soundtrack also featured "What If", which had previously been released on Human Clay.)	2000	Scream 3	
"To Whom It May Concern"	2002	The Scorpion King	
