= Greatest Hits (Creed album) =

Compilation album by Creed
- Released: November 22, 2004
- Recorded: Various times and locations
- Genres: Post-grunge; hard rock; alternative rock; alternative metal
- Length: 62:54
- Label: Wind-up
- Producer: John Kurzweg

Creed chronology
Weathered (2001)	Greatest Hits (2004)	Full Circle (2009)

Professional ratings
Review scores
Source	Rating
AllMusic	4/5 stars
Classic Rock	4/5 stars
Cryptic Rock	4.5/5

Greatest Hits is a compilation album by American rock band Creed. It was released on November 22, 2004, soon after the announcement that the band had broken up in June, and that lead singer Scott Stapp and the other members of the band would go their separate ways, although the band would later reunite in 2009. It consists of every one of Creed's U.S. singles from their first three albums: My Own Prison (1997), Human Clay (1999), and Weathered (2001), only leaving out their international single, "Hide"; the song "What's This Life For" has censored lyrics on this release, and is cut down to 3 minutes and 32 seconds in length. The album also includes a DVD that contains all of the band's music videos and several live performances.

On November 19, 2008, the album was certified 2× Platinum by the RIAA, and by early 2010 the album had sold 2,151,058 copies in the U.S.

== Track listing ==
All songs written by Mark Tremonti and Scott Stapp.

No.	Title	Original album	Length
1.	"Torn"	My Own Prison (1997)	6:25
2.	"My Own Prison"	My Own Prison	5:00
3.	"What's This Life For" (Album edit)	My Own Prison	3:32
4.	"One"	My Own Prison	5:02
5.	"Are You Ready?"	Human Clay (1999)	4:46
6.	"Higher"	Human Clay	5:25
7.	"With Arms Wide Open"	Human Clay	4:38
8.	"What If"	Human Clay	5:18
9.	"One Last Breath"	Weathered (2001)	3:59
10.	"Don't Stop Dancing"	Weathered	4:30
11.	"Bullets"	Weathered	3:51
12.	"My Sacrifice"	Weathered	4:55
13.	"Weathered"	Weathered	5:29
Total length:			62:54

=== Videos ===
1. "My Own Prison"
2. "What's This Life For"
3. "Higher"
4. "With Arms Wide Open"
5. "What If"
6. "One Last Breath"
7. "Don't Stop Dancing"
8. "Bullets" (Animated)
9. "My Sacrifice"
10. "Torn" (Live)
11. "Higher" (Live)
12. "Weathered" (Live)

== Personnel ==
=== Band members ===
- Scott Stapp – lead vocals
- Mark Tremonti – guitar, backing vocals, bass (tracks 9–13)
- Brian Marshall – bass (tracks 1–8)
- Scott Phillips – drums

=== Additional musicians ===
- Amie Stapp – backing vocals on "Don't Stop Dancing"
- The Tallahassee Boy's Choir on "Don't Stop Dancing"

== Charts ==
=== Weekly charts ===
Chart (2004)	Peak position
Australian Albums (ARIA)	26
Austrian Albums (Ö3 Austria)	29
Canadian Albums (Nielsen SoundScan)	25
German Albums (Offizielle Top 100)	86
Irish Albums (IRMA)	55
New Zealand Albums (RMNZ)	2
Swiss Albums (Schweizer Hitparade)	64
UK Albums (Official Charts)	156
UK Rock & Metal Albums (Official Charts)	12
US Billboard 200	15

Chart (2025)	Peak position
Canadian Albums (Billboard)	56
US Top Rock & Alternative Albums (Billboard)	16

=== Year-end charts ===
Chart (2005)	Position
US Billboard 200	70
Chart (2006)	Position
US Billboard 200	159
Chart (2024)	Position
US Billboard 200	199
Chart (2025)	Position
US Billboard 200	80

== Sales and certifications ==
Region	Certification	Certified units/sales
Argentina (CAPIF)	3× Platinum	120,000^{^}
Australia (ARIA)	Gold	35,000^{^}
Canada (Music Canada)	Gold	50,000^{^}
New Zealand (RMNZ)	2× Platinum	30,000^{^}
United Kingdom (BPI)	Silver	60,000^{‡}
United States (RIAA)	2× Platinum	2,000,000^{^}
^{^} Shipments figures based on certification alone.^{‡} Sales+streaming figures based on certification alone.
