= One Last Breath (Creed song) =

2002 single by Creed

Single by Creed

from the album Weathered
- Released: April 15, 2002
- Recorded: Mid–late 2001
- Studio: J. Stanley Productions (Ocoee, Florida)
- Length: 3:58
- Label: Epic; Wind-up
- Songwriters: Mark Tremonti; Scott Stapp
- Producers: John Kurzweg; Kirk Kelsey; Creed

Creed singles chronology
| "Bullets" (2002) | "One Last Breath" (2002) | "Hide" (2002) |

Music video
- "One Last Breath" on YouTube

"One Last Breath" is a song by American rock band Creed. The band's lead vocalist, Scott Stapp, wrote the song over a period of three weeks and recorded at J. Stanley Productions Inc in Ocoee, Florida. The lyrics of the song are about reflecting on past mistakes and seeking comfort from friends who want to help. It was released in April 2002 as the third single from their third studio album, Weathered (2001).

The song reached number six on the US Billboard Hot 100 chart, becoming Creed's fourth and most recent top-10 hit. It also reached number five on the Billboard Mainstream Rock Tracks chart, number four on the Billboard Mainstream Top 40, and number two on the Billboard Adult Top 40. Worldwide, the song topped Canada's airplay chart and entered the top 40 in New Zealand, peaking at number 29. In Ireland and the United Kingdom, the song was released as a double A-side with the band's preceding single, "Bullets".

"One Last Breath" experienced a resurgence of popularity in 2024, entering the top 10 on the hard rock streaming charts over 20 years after its original release.

== Writing and recording ==
We would get excited after we wrote a song because we felt it. We used to have this saying: “Does it pass the goosebump test?” If it didn’t give us goosebumps, we didn’t want to put it on our records. And with “One Last Breath,” we felt it. We knew it was special to us. We knew that we had written something that inspired and resonated with us. And when that happened, we knew it was going to resonate with our fans.

— Scott Stapp, on the writing process for "One Last Breath"

Prior to recording the Weathered album, Creed had agreed that during the tour for Human Clay that no new songs could be written, so that the band members could "live life and have experiences". The band also agreed that they would not listen to any music between the ending of the Human Clay Tour and the start of writing sessions for Weathered, so as not to allow any other music to subconsciously influence the band's writing process and to ensure that all the songs came completely from them. "One Last Breath" was written within a three-week period along with all the other material from the album, which was done primarily in Scott Stapp's living room during four-hour sessions, as well as on his Sea Ray cruiser.

Stapp recalls the writing process for the song in a 2024 interview with Spin, stating "I didn't feel any particular pressure to write a particular kind of song. I don't think we ever thought that way; we just wrote what we felt. We just got together and created whatever came out, and we put on a record if we liked it." Stapp noted that after they had completed writing the song, the band felt that they had written something inspirational that would resonate with both them and the fans alike. The band would also use something they called "the goosebump test", where the song would have to give them literal goosebumps after the song was completely written, as they did not want to put any material on the record if it did not pass the test.

The song was recorded and mixed at J. Stanley Productions Inc. recording studio in Ocoee, Florida, in mid to late 2001 using Pro Tools.

== Music and lyrics ==
As with all of Creed's songs, the music was written by guitarist Mark Tremonti. The song is written in the key of D major, with Tremonti playing in standard E tuning and Stapp singing in his traditional baritone with his vocal range spanning from D3-B4. Tremonti stated in an interview with Songfacts that the song contains one of his favorite guitar lines and musical compositions that he ever wrote.

"One Last Breath' is one of my favorite guitar lines, so it's one of my favorite musical compositions for Creed. It's a song that turned out to be one of our biggest songs we ever put out. I think it had some of the most views we've ever had on YouTube, so it's a very important one for the Creed camp." — Tremonti

The lyrics, according to Stapp, were contributed by both he and Tremonti. Stapp recalls writing the lyrics to the verses over a loop of Tremonti's guitar picking, stating that they "came from the bottom of our hearts." He also recalls the artistic chemistry that he and Tremonti had, as well as the spiritual, emotional, and mental connection that would see them each provide lines that they found themselves articulating for each other. Stapp states, "We were on the same wavelength. [A specific lyrical line] may have come from a different place, but it was still one voice, and it was very special. And always straight from the heart."

According to Stapp, the song is about someone crying out for help and realizing the mistakes they've made in their past, as well as being able to lean on one's friends and keeping them close. Stapp also expresses sentiments about how in the minds of "normal, well-adjusted" people, any thoughts of moving beyond this life are not real, and how these surreal thoughts are just flashes-in-the-pan and they would never act upon them.

Further expanding on the meaning behind the song, Stapp recalls that lyrically, "One Last Breath" fit exactly where he personally was at the time, both in mind and spirit. The physical, emotional, and spiritual burnout he was experiencing at the time, which he attributes to the pressure on the band to constantly release new records as well as the aggressive touring schedule, was catching up to him. This, compounded with the taxing effect of the band's meteoric rise in previous years, eventually led him to go down several wrong paths in choosing how to cope with the pressure that would eventually lead to the band's breakup. Mark Tremonti also recalls the song perfectly reflected where the band was at the time, as it was written during the initial stages of the band breaking apart. Calling that period the "darkest time for the band," "One Last Breath" is one of the band's most truthful songs and was "genuinely sung by Scott and genuinely played by us," according to Tremonti.

== Release and reception ==
Released on April 15, 2002, as the third single from Weathered, the song was a chart success both in the United States and internationally. "One Last Breath" gave Creed their fourth and final top-10 hit on the US Billboard Hot 100, spending a total of 34 weeks on the chart and peaking at number six on the week of September 28, 2002. The song also reached number five on the Billboard Mainstream Rock chart, number four on the Mainstream Top 40 chart, and number two on the Adult Top 40 chart. Internationally, the song peaked at number 43 in Australia and number 29 in New Zealand. In the United Kingdom and Ireland—where the song was released as a double A-side with "Bullets"—it peaked at number 47 on the UK Singles Chart and number 41 on the Irish Singles Chart. It also charted in Germany, peaking at number 89.

== Music video ==
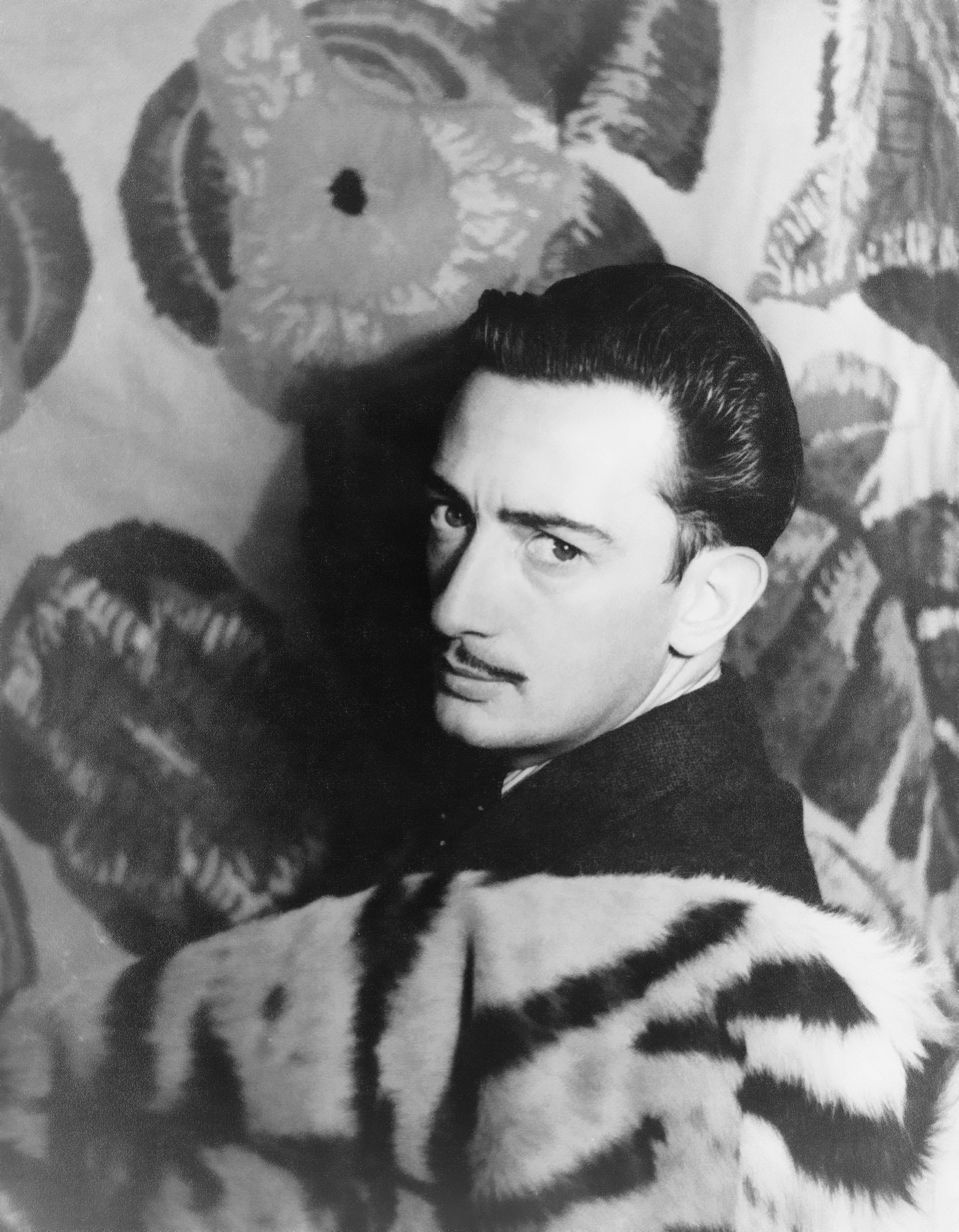
Salvador Dalí (pictured in 1939) served as an artistic inspiration to both Stapp and Meyers for the music video

The video was directed by Dave Meyers, who had previously directed the videos for "What If", "With Arms Wide Open" and "My Sacrifice". He would go on to co-direct the video for the band's next single, "Don't Stop Dancing", along with Stapp. Stapp drafted the treatment for the video and explained his ideas to Meyers. They soon found out they both had a shared love and affection for Salvador Dalí, a Spanish painter known for his surrealist artwork. Most of the video was shot against a green screen with computer-generated animations to create the setting in which the band performs in as well as the otherworldly visuals.

"We've used surreal imagery in our artwork since the beginning, but this is the first video we've fully explored it in. "My Sacrifice" kind of started the surrealism vibe, but we took this one to a different level. There are backdrops kind of like Star Wars, with all these computer-generated cities and scenes that look real but they're not." — Stapp

On the day of the shoot, Stapp was involved in an automobile accident. On April 19, 2002, around 1:40 in the afternoon, Stapp, while driving his Cadillac SUV on Interstate 4 in Florida was struck from behind by a Ford SUV. According to Stapp, the vehicle was going at "probably 50 or 60 miles per hour". Stapp was sent flying forward in his vehicle, with his body hitting the steering wheel and his head hitting the windshield. Stapp, concerned about the wellbeing of the person who hit him, got out of his vehicle to check on the other driver. Although initially the officer on the scene reported no injuries, Stapp soon realized he had not gone unscathed while calling his manager after the accident. He had suffered a concussion from the whiplash and from hitting the windshield. Stapp claims that the police on the scene didn't note any injuries in their report because he refused to call an ambulance or go to the hospital.

Due to prior commitments with director Dave Meyers, Stapp managed to show up to shoot the video the very next day where shooting began at 6:00 a.m. Actress Dawn Cairns, who appeared in the "My Sacrifice" video, also makes an appearance as the woman crying bloody tears into a bowl. The band flew her in from Argentina where she had just finished a shoot two days earlier. Beginning to feel the effects of the accident, Stapp had to be medicated during the shoot to deal with the pain in his head, neck, and spine, and was also suffering from a headache. A doctor and a masseuse were on site during the shooting of the video, and a body double was used for certain scenes Stapp was unable to complete. Stapp was limited in the video as he mainly just stood and sang with little movement or gesticulation. Meyers told Stapp during the shoot that his facial expressions from the pain actually helped in getting the emotion of the song to come across better and noted that he could tell Stapp was in terrible pain during the last shot of the video.

After the shooting was completed, Stapp's pain continued to worsen, and after an MRI on his neck and back it was revealed that the extent of his injuries were worse than originally thought. Doctors discovered he had a bulging disk between two vertebrae in his neck and a smashed disk in his lower back. An adjacent missing disk from a congenital condition likely worsened the situation.

== Track listings ==
UK CD single

1. "One Last Breath" (radio version)
2. "Bullets" (album version)
3. "I'm Eighteen"
4. "One Last Breath" (video)

UK DVD single

1. "Bullets" (video)
2. "What If" (two-minute video clip)
3. "Torn" (audio)
4. "One Last Breath" (audio)

European CD single

1. "One Last Breath" (radio version) – 3:58
2. "Is This the End (Scream edit)" – 6:15

Australian and New Zealand CD single

1. "One Last Breath" (radio version) – 3:58
2. "Is This the End" (Scream edit) – 6:15
3. "My Own Prison" (acoustic extended version) – 5:03
4. "One Last Breath" (video) – 3:59

== Charts ==
=== Weekly charts ===
Weekly chart performance for "One Last Breath"
| Chart (2002) | Peak position |
|---|---|
| Australia (ARIA) | 43 |
| Canada Radio (Nielsen BDS) | 1 |
| Canada CHR (Nielsen BDS) | 2 |
| Germany (GfK) | 89 |
| Ireland (IRMA) with "Bullets" | 41 |
| New Zealand (Recorded Music NZ) | 29 |
| Scottish Singles Sales (Official Charts) with "Bullets" | 42 |
| UK Singles (Official Charts) with "Bullets" | 47 |
| US Billboard Hot 100 | 6 |
| US Adult Pop Airplay (Billboard) | 2 |
| US Alternative Airplay (Billboard) | 17 |
| US Mainstream Rock Airplay (Billboard) | 5 |
| US Pop Airplay (Billboard) | 4 |

=== Year-end charts ===
2002 year-end chart performance for "One Last Breath"
| Chart (2002) | Position |
|---|---|
| Canada Radio (Nielsen BDS) | 13 |
| US Billboard Hot 100 | 27 |
| US Adult Top 40 (Billboard) | 16 |
| US Mainstream Rock Tracks (Billboard) | 15 |
| US Mainstream Top 40 (Billboard) | 26 |
| US Modern Rock Tracks (Billboard) | 40 |

2003 year-end chart performance for "One Last Breath"
| Chart (2003) | Position |
|---|---|
| US Adult Top 40 (Billboard) | 32 |

== Certifications ==
Certifications and sales for "One Last Breath"
| Region | Certification | Certified units/sales |
|---|---|---|
| Brazil (Pro-Música Brasil) | Gold | 30,000^{‡} |
| New Zealand (RMNZ) | 4× Platinum | 120,000^{‡} |
| United Kingdom (BPI) | Gold | 400,000^{‡} |
| United States (RIAA) | 2× Platinum | 2,000,000^{‡} |
^{‡} Sales+streaming figures based on certification alone.

== Release history ==
Release dates and formats for "One Last Breath"
| Region | Date | Format(s) | Label(s) | Ref. |
|---|---|---|---|---|
| United States | April 15, 2002 | Mainstream rock; active rock; alternative radio | Wind-up | |
| United States | May 13, 2002 | Contemporary hit; hot adult contemporary radio | Wind-up | |
| United Kingdom | July 22, 2002 | CD | Epic; Wind-up | |
| Australia | September 23, 2002 | CD | Epic; Wind-up | |

== In popular culture ==
On September 16, 2014, "One Last Breath" was made available as downloadable content as part of the "Creed 5-Song Pack" for the video game Rocksmith 2014 along with "Higher", "My Own Prison", "My Sacrifice" and "With Arms Wide Open".
