= My Sacrifice =

2001 single by Creed

Single by Creed

from the album Weathered
- Released: October 16, 2001
- Genre: Post-grunge; hard rock
- Length: 4:54 (album version); 4:19 (radio edit)
- Label: Epic; Wind-up
- Songwriters: Mark Tremonti; Scott Stapp
- Producers: John Kurzweg; Kirk Kelsey

Creed singles chronology
"Are You Ready?" (2000)	"My Sacrifice" (2001)	"Bullets" (2002)

Music video
- "My Sacrifice" on YouTube

"My Sacrifice" is a song by the American rock band Creed. It was released on October 16, 2001, as the lead single from their third studio album, Weathered. The song peaked at number four on the US Billboard Hot 100 chart for the week of February 9, 2002, and reached number one on the Mainstream Rock Tracks chart for nine consecutive weeks, beginning in December 2001. Worldwide, the song was a top-20 hit in Australia, Ireland, New Zealand, and the United Kingdom. The song was nominated for a Grammy Award for Best Rock Performance by a Duo or Group with Vocal in 2003 at the 45th Annual Grammy Awards.

== Writing and recording ==
Scott Stapp recalls the writing process of "My Sacrifice" in a 2019 interview with Kerrang.

"From what I remember, writing it happened the way things usually happened when we wrote together – Mark's got an acoustic guitar and I've got some lyrics I've begun, or we're just freestyling and something comes out. A melody or a line or a lyric comes out and we start playing off each other and discussing, 'Let's go here, let's go there, let's do this' and then I would step away from that session and go bury myself into the lyric writing. And then I'd get back together with him and we would develop the song even more. It all came together in a very symbiotic way – like 90 per cent of the songs came during our writing relationship did." — Stapp

According to Stapp, both Mark Tremonti and himself knew that they had written something special that would connect with people and that Creed fans at the time would appreciate it and like it. However, they did not know it would go on to become so successful and "stand the test of time." During the recording sessions of Weathered at the J. Stanley Productions Inc. recording studio in Ocoee, Florida, Jay Stanley recalls his initial impression of hearing "My Sacrifice" while working with the band stating that he knew the song was going to be huge the first time he heard it. Tremonti recalls in a 2024 interview with Spin that "My Sacrifice" was one of the earliest songs the band wrote for the Weathered album. He recalls that the band would play an early version of the song during the soundchecks during the Human Clay tour.

== Music and lyrics ==
"My Sacrifice" is written in the key of D major, with Tremonti playing in open D5, which he states is his favourite guitar tuning. Stapp sings in his signature baritone vocal style with his vocal range spanning from F#3–F#4 in scientific pitch notation. Stapp stated that the meaning of the song lyrics was about his own personal struggles with battling substance abuse, addiction and alcoholism and failing despite his best efforts, and him coming to terms with his inability to stay on the straight and narrow.

Stapp also explains that the song is about coming out of a dark place or period in your life and reconnecting with yourself. He notes several of the songs lyrical themes are represented through elements in the music video. These include a shot of himself in a rowboat where he is seen pulling a drowning version of himself out of the water onto the boat, which represents periods of his life where he would claim sobriety, coming out from the darkness and finding temporary clarity, only to fall back into his old habits. He also mentions that the shots of other people in the video are representative of the feelings you have when you are with someone you love.

== Release and reception ==
On October 10, the band posted a downloadable Creed pager on their official website as well as on VH1.com, which enabled fans first access to the bands music and news, including early access to downloading "My Sacrifice" prior to its official release. The pager experienced 20,000 downloads in just its first day of release. Officially released on October 16, as the lead single to the bands third studio album, Weathered, the song found success in the United States, debuting at number 50 on the US Billboard Hot 100 chart for the week of October 27, 2001, and entering the top 10 by the final week of the year. The song would peak at number four on the issue of February 9, 2002—the band's second-highest-charting single on the Hot 100 after their only number-one hit, "With Arms Wide Open"—and would remain on the chart for 29 weeks. The song would finish at number 20 on the 2002 Billboard Hot 100 year-end chart. The song would also go on to top the Billboard Mainstream Rock Tracks chart for nine consecutive weeks starting in December 2001. Worldwide, the song reached number 11 in Australia, number 12 in Scotland, number 15 in Ireland, number 16 in New Zealand, and number 18 on the UK Singles Chart. It was nominated for Best Rock Video at the 2002 MTV Video Music Awards, losing to "In the End" by Linkin Park. At the 2003 Grammy Awards, the song was nominated for Grammy Award for Best Rock Performance by a Duo or Group with Vocal but once again lost, this time to "In My Place" by Coldplay.

== Music video ==
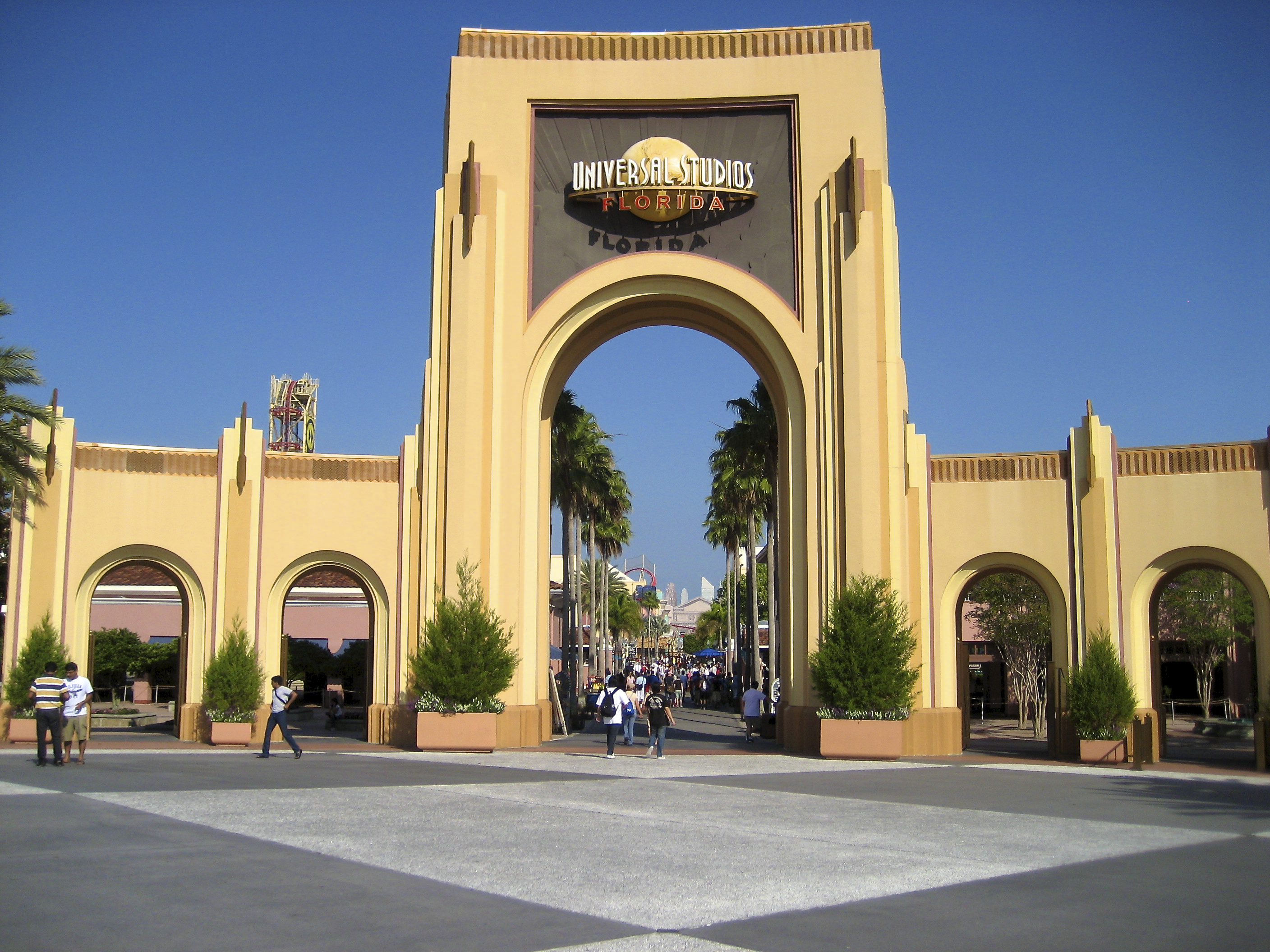
Entrance to Universal Studios Florida theme park, which served as a filming location for the video.

The music video, directed by David Meyers, was the first video over which Creed had complete creative control. Parts of the music video were filmed just off Interstate 4's exit 48 for County Road 557 in Polk County, Florida. The rest of the video was filmed at Universal Studios Florida theme park. The New York-styled street outside the former Kongfrontation ride was filled with water for the video. The production of the video was the subject of an episode of MTV's Making the Video.

The video begins in a park with an old, seemingly blind man, portrayed by actor Herbert Maynard, feeding pigeons before the camera pans into his mind, showing flashbacks of a flooding city, where members of the band perform, while Scott Stapp sings in a rowboat. Stapp passes by many people, including a woman seen rising from under the water reaching out to him, portrayed by actress Dawn Cairns, who also appears in the music video for "One Last Breath", before seeing a fist jump out of the water at him. He rescues the person, realizing that it is actually him, relating to the song's theme of reunion within oneself and believing. During the bridge, the band performs in a school bus illuminated by candles, followed by Stapp in a diner while a young boy, portrayed by actor Kellen Foruria, hides from a storm. After a baby carriage slams into the diner window, the harsh weather seen throughout the video dies down to a peaceful, sunny setting, and the boy goes to hug the older Scott, but loses his eyesight. By contrast, the older man at the start of the video regains his identity, revealing that both the young boy and the old man are Stapp at different points in his life.

== Appearances in media ==
"My Sacrifice" has been used in a variety of sports media. It was used in a series of promotional tribute videos made by WWE that aired throughout late 2001 into early 2002, showcasing the promotion's roster at the time and illustrating their dedication, desire, and sacrifice. It was performed by Creed on the November 17, 2001, episode of Saturday Night Live, along with the band's next single, "Bullets". The song was played as part of a medley which also included "Don't Stop Dancing" and "Higher" during the bands performance at the halftime show at the 2001 Dallas Cowboys' annual Thanksgiving Day football game on November 22, 2001. "My Sacrifice" was played during the bands December 2, 2001, appearance at the 2001 My VH1 Music Awards and the next day on the December 3, 2001, episode of The Tonight Show with Jay Leno.

As part of the Weathered tour, the band played "My Sacrifice" as the closing song during their hour special VH1 "Opening Night Live" performance in Atlanta, Georgia, at the Philips Arena on January 16, 2002, as well during their February 19, 2002, performance at the 2002 Winter Olympics closing ceremony.

On September 16, 2014, "My Sacrifice" was made available as downloadable content for the video game Rocksmith 2014, along with "Higher", "My Own Prison", "One Last Breath" and "With Arms Wide Open" as part of the "Creed 5-Song Pack".

== Track listings ==
Australian and European maxi-CD single

1. "My Sacrifice" (radio edit) – 4:17
2. "My Sacrifice" (album version) – 4:57
3. "Riders on the Storm" (album version with Robby Krieger) – 6:19
4. "My Sacrifice" (video) – 4:37

European CD single

1. "My Sacrifice" (radio edit) – 4:17
2. "Riders on the Storm" (album version with Robby Krieger) – 6:19

UK 7-inch single

1. "My Sacrifice" (album version) – 4:57
2. "Riders on the Storm" (with Robby Krieger) – 6:19

UK CD single

1. "My Sacrifice" (radio edit) – 4:17
2. "Riders on the Storm" (with Robby Krieger) – 6:19
3. "With Arms Wide Open" (strings version) – 3:55
4. "My Sacrifice" (video)

UK DVD single

1. "My Sacrifice" (video)
2. "To Whom It May Concern" (audio)
3. "Young Grow Old" (audio)
4. "My Own Prison" (30-second video clip)
5. "With Arms Wide Open" (30-second video clip)
6. "What's This Life For" (30-second video clip)

== Charts ==
=== Weekly charts ===
Weekly chart performance for "My Sacrifice"
Chart (2001–2002)	Peak position
Australia (ARIA)	11
Canada CHR (Nielsen BDS)	7
Europe (Eurochart Hot 100)	86
Germany (GfK)	79
Ireland (IRMA)	15
Netherlands (Dutch Top 40 Tipparade)	3
Netherlands (Single Top 100)	44
New Zealand (Recorded Music NZ)	16
Scottish Singles Sales (Official Charts)	12
Switzerland (Schweizer Hitparade)	92
UK Singles (Official Charts)	18
UK Rock & Metal (Official Charts)	2
US Billboard Hot 100	4
US Adult Alternative Airplay (Billboard)	19
US Adult Pop Airplay (Billboard)	3
US Alternative Airplay (Billboard)	2
US Mainstream Rock Airplay (Billboard)	1
US Pop Airplay (Billboard)	6

=== Year-end charts ===
2001 year-end chart performance for "My Sacrifice"
Chart (2001)	Position
US Modern Rock Tracks (Billboard)	75

2002 year-end chart performance for "My Sacrifice"
Chart (2002)	Position
Australia (ARIA)	80
Brazil (Crowley)	61
Canada Radio (Nielsen BDS)	19
US Billboard Hot 100	20
US Adult Top 40 (Billboard)	11
US Mainstream Rock Tracks (Billboard)	9
US Mainstream Top 40 (Billboard)	23
US Modern Rock Tracks (Billboard)	20

== Certifications ==
Certifications and sales for "My Sacrifice"
Region	Certification	Certified units/sales
Australia (ARIA)	Gold	35,000^{^}
Brazil (Pro-Música Brasil)	Gold	30,000^{‡}
New Zealand (RMNZ)	2× Platinum	60,000^{‡}
United Kingdom (BPI)	Silver	200,000^{‡}
United States (RIAA)	2× Platinum	2,000,000^{‡}
^{^} Shipments figures based on certification alone.^{‡} Sales+streaming figures based on certification alone.

== Release history ==
Release dates and formats for "My Sacrifice"
Region	Date	Format(s)	Label(s)	Ref.
United States	October 16, 2001	Mainstream rock; active rock radio	Wind-up	
United States	November 5, 2001	Other radio formats	Wind-up	
Australia	January 21, 2002	CD	Wind-up; Epic	
United Kingdom	March 4, 2002	7-inch vinyl; CD; cassette	Wind-up; Epic	
