= Weathered (song) =

Single by Creed

from the album Weathered
- Released: November 6, 2002
- Recorded: 2001
- Genre: Post-grunge; hard rock
- Length: 5:30 (album version); 4:30 (radio edit)
- Label: Wind-up
- Songwriters: Mark Tremonti; Scott Stapp
- Producer: John Kurzweg

Creed singles chronology
"Don't Stop Dancing" (2002)	"Weathered" (2002)	"Overcome" (2009)

"Weathered" is a song by American rock band Creed. It was released on November 6, 2002, as the last single from their album, Weathered. The song was the band's last single until "Overcome" in 2009.

== Writing and recording ==
Creed began writing sessions for the Weathered album following their tour in support of Human Clay, which, according to vocalist Scott Stapp, was done because "We wanted to live life and have experiences, and set aside a time later where we would write,". Prior to writing new songs, the band agreed not to listen to any music between the end of the tour and the beginning of the writing sessions, so as not to allow anything to subconsciously influence their writing process so that all the material would come from them. "Weathered" was written during a three-week period along with the rest of the album, with writing sessions mostly taking place in Stapp's living room over four-hour sessions, and later on from his Sea Ray cruiser.

Recording sessions began on July 20, 2001, when the band entered J. Stanley Productions Inc. recording studio in Ocoee, Florida. The band worked alongside Jay Stanley, who would sporadically come and go throughout the sessions, Full Sail University graduate Shilpa Patel, who helped record and mix the album, and longtime producer John Kurzweg. The album was recorded and mixed in just four months using Pro Tools during the summer and early fall.

== Music and lyrics ==
"Weathered" is a post-grunge and hard rock song, with elements of blues. The song is written in the key of F major, with guitarist Mark Tremonti playing in open D5 tuning, which he cites as his favorite guitar tuning. According to producer John Kurzweg, the song has a classic-rock vibe that reminds him of Bad Company or Lynyrd Skynyrd. The lyrics, written by Stapp, address his feelings of sadness, bleakness and the pressures that came with living the rock star lifestyle while simultaneously having to conceal his rapidly deteriorating and unraveling mental state at the time from those around him.

"Yeah, and I think you could see that clearly in the Weathered album. The title and the lyrics on that record absolutely relate to that - "I'm rusted and weathered, barely holding together, I'm covered with skin that peels and it just won't heal" - that was me sharing my heart and soul. I guess I'd learned how to flip the switch when I had to." — Stapp

== Release and reception ==
Released on November 6, 2002, nearly an entire year after the album's release, "Weathered" became the band's 11th song to reach the top ten on the Billboard Mainstream Rock chart, peaking at number 7 on February 1, 2003. On the Modern Rock chart, the song didn't fare quite as well, where it only managed to peak at number 30. On the Active Rock chart, the song peaked at number 13, and finished at number 50 on the 2003 year-end chart.

== Appearances in media ==
Creed performed the song live on December 9, 2002, atop the 1,149 ft observation tower at The Strat (formerly the Stratosphere), at the 2002 Billboard Music Awards, where the band won four Billboard Music Awards. "Weathered" was used in a WWE "Desire" tribute video entitled "Behind the Scenes" in 2002, as well as for the closing music video at the 1st annual WWE Tribute to the Troops professional wrestling event in 2003.

== Chart performance ==
Weekly chart performance for "Weathered"
Chart (2002–2003)	Peak position
US Alternative Airplay (Billboard)	30
US Mainstream Rock (Billboard)	7

=== Year-end charts ===
Year-end chart performance for "Weathered"
Chart (2003)	Peak position
US Active Rock (Billboard)	50
