= One Last Breath =

One Last Breath may refer to:

- "One Last Breath" (Creed song), 2001
- "One Last Breath" (Maria Elena Kyriakou song), 2015
