= Hide (Creed song) =

Single by Creed

from the album Weathered
- Released: July 1, 2002
- Length: 4:27
- Label: Wind-up
- Songwriters: Mark Tremonti; Scott Stapp
- Producers: John Kurzweg; Kirk Kelsey

Creed singles chronology
"One Last Breath" (2002)	"Hide" (2002)	"Don't Stop Dancing" (2002)

"Hide" is a song by American rock band Creed from their third album, Weathered (2001). It was released as a CD single in Australia only, containing two other songs—"Bullets" and "Unforgiven"—along with the CGI-made video for "Bullets".

== Charts ==
Weekly chart performance for "Hide"
Chart (2002)	Peak position
Australia (ARIA)	65
