= Young Grow Old =

Song by Creed

from the album Human Clay
- Released: September 28, 1999
- Recorded: Late 1998 – early 1999
- Genre: Alternative metal
- Length: 4:47
- Label: Wind-up
- Songwriter: Scott Stapp
- Producer: John Kurzweg

"Young Grow Old" is a song by the American rock band Creed. Initially released as a bonus track on European versions of the band's second studio album Human Clay in 1999, the song was later re-released as part of the World Wrestling Federation's Forceable Entry compilation soundtrack in 2002; the song would also be used as the theme for the Backlash event that same year. The song was further re-released in 2015 on the group's compilation album With Arms Wide Open: A Retrospective and in 2024 on the 25th anniversary deluxe edition of Human Clay.

== Composition and lyrics ==
"Young Grow Old" is often said to be one of Creed's heavier songs in their library, bearing heavy riffs and distorted guitars along with a sudden energetic intro. The song reflects on the internal struggle between youthful innocence and adult responsibilities, using the metaphor of a battle between boy and man to illustrate the inevitable passage of time and the loss of youthful vigor.
