= Weathered =

Studio album by Creed
- Released: November 20, 2001
- Recorded: July–August 2001
- Studios: J. Stanley Productions (Ocoee, Florida); Transcontinental (Orlando, Florida)
- Genres: Post-grunge; hard rock; alternative metal
- Length: 50:05
- Label: Wind-up
- Producers: John Kurzweg; Kirk Kelsey; Creed

Creed chronology
Human Clay (1999)	Weathered (2001)	Greatest Hits (2004)

Singles from Weathered
- 1. "My Sacrifice" Released: October 16, 2001; 2. "Bullets" Released: February 23, 2002; 3. "One Last Breath" Released: April 15, 2002; 4. "Hide" Released: July 1, 2002; 5. "Don't Stop Dancing" Released: October 22, 2002; 6. "Weathered" Released: November 6, 2002

Weathered is the third studio album by American rock band Creed, released on November 20, 2001. It was the last Creed album to be released until Full Circle in October 2009, as Creed disbanded in June 2004. Weathered is the only Creed album to be recorded as a trio, as bassist Brian Marshall departed in August 2000, with guitarist Mark Tremonti taking over the bass guitar part during recording. Tremonti and vocalist Scott Stapp wrote most of the material for the album during a three-week period in late 2000, following their successful tour to support their second album, Human Clay. Manager Jeff Hanson once again paired the band with long-time producer John Kurzweg, who rented out a private residence/recording studio in Ocoee, Florida owned by Jay Stanley, where the band set up a studio inside to record the album. Recording sessions for the album began in July 2001 and took four months to complete.

Stapp described the album as "two records in one" and "a very extreme record", as it features some of Creed's heaviest and most aggressive songs, plus experimental tracks and many of the band's most popular ballads. The lyrics on Weathered tackle familiar topics often addressed by the band, including Christianity and faith, discrimination and unity, depression, loneliness, and friendship, as well as more current and personal issues such as criticism and persecution of the band by their critics and the press, substance abuse, dealing with the pressures of fame and the rock star lifestyle, feelings of invisibility and insignificance, and Stapp's deteriorating physical and mental health, which continued to worsen throughout their hectic tour in support of the album.

The album debuted at number one on the US Billboard 200, the band's second consecutive studio album to top the chart, and remained at the top spot for eight consecutive weeks, the longest consecutive run since the Beatles's greatest hits album 1 (2000) the year prior. Weathered also spawned six singles, including two top 10 Billboard Hot 100 singles: "One Last Breath", which peaked at number 6, and "My Sacrifice", which peaked at number 4. It has since been certified 6× platinum by the RIAA for sales of over 6 million units in the US alone. Weathered received mixed reviews from critics, with some praising the band for their nuance, refined sound and unapologetic emotion, while others criticized the album for its lack of creativity and for being far too serious and pretentious. In 2025, Lauryn Schaffner of Loudwire named the album the best post-grunge release of 2001.

== Background ==
Following the massive success of Creed's second album Human Clay, the band began to experience turmoil during their tour in support of the album in the summer of 2000. Bassist Brian Marshall's problems with alcoholism and addiction were taking their toll on the band. Marshall physically threatened guitarist Mark Tremonti and even began attacking vocalist Scott Stapp verbally and online. After a band meeting Marshall was fired. The public initially thought Marshall was let go due to comments he made about Pearl Jam frontman Eddie Vedder during a radio interview with KNDD in June, claiming that Stapp was a better songwriter and criticizing Pearl Jam's recent albums for not having hooks. Marshall was replaced for the remainder of the tour with Brett Hestla of Virgos Merlot.

Stapp's own struggles with alcoholism, addiction, and depression also began to worsen during this period. He began drinking heavily to cope with his depression as well as with the pressures of fame and the band's success. He also became involved in many violent altercations, including in April 2001 when he punched a badgering fan at a club in St. Augustine, Florida, after the man reportedly told him "You should’ve stuck with Pearl Jam." However, no charges were filed. When asked about the altercation, Stapp responded by saying "I was going to turn the other cheek, but Jesus never had to deal with this Pearl Jam crap."

As Stapp's drinking addiction became more severe, he also became addicted to Percocet shortly after the release of the album following a car accident in the spring of 2002, as well as a host of other medications including Xanax and throat steroids like Decadron. Stapp's deterioration continued until he reached a point where he was "drinking from the time I woke up ‘til the time I went to sleep, and under the influence of pills as well." These addictions eventually culminated in a notorious breakdown during a December 29, 2002, live show at the Allstate Arena in Chicago, which led to the band's eventual break-up.

== Writing and recording ==
Creed approached the writing process differently for Weathered than they did for their previous two albums. Prior to writing new material, the band made a rule that during the tour for Human Clay no new songs could be composed. Stapp says the reason for this was that he wanted the band to "live life and have experiences" before he and guitarist Mark Tremonti began writing new songs. Stapp and Tremonti also vowed not to listen to any music at all between the end of the Human Clay tour and the start of writing sessions for Weathered. Stapp said the reason for this was that he wanted to ensure that nothing would subconsciously influence the band's writing process, so that all the material would come from them. After finishing the final leg of their tour in December 2000, Stapp and Tremonti began writing new songs. In their attempt to avoid influences of popular contemporary music on their writing, Stapp and Tremonti would go out of their way to listen to either non-genre-specific music or classic rock, including artists such as the Eagles, 2Pac and Bob Marley, which Stapp admits was done with the intention of not having anything near to what they were doing affecting their creative process. Stapp recalls the writing process for the album, stating "I didn’t feel any particular pressure to write a particular kind of song. I don’t think we ever thought that way; we just wrote what we felt. We just got together and created whatever came out, and we put on a record if we liked it." The band would also use something they called "the goosebump test", where the song would have to give them literal goosebumps after the song was completely written, as they did not want to put any material on the record if it did not pass the test. After just three weeks, the songwriting duo had managed to write an entire album's worth of material. Following a short holiday break, the band decided to take a laid-back approach to the recording and release of the album, deciding to spend the first several months of 2001 refining the new material before entering the recording studio. Most of the writing for the album was done in Stapp's living room during four-hour sessions, four nights a week. During the final days of writing Tremonti and Stapp wrote while on Stapp's boat, a Sea Ray cruiser.

On July 20, 2001, Stapp, Tremonti, and Phillips entered J. Stanley Productions Inc., a private residence/recording studio in Ocoee, Florida, to begin recording. The home studio featured two in-home control rooms: Studio A, which was decked out with purple lights and purple lava lamps and which Jay Stanley claimed helped spark his creativity; and Studio B, where Creed held their recording sessions. The album was recorded and mixed in just four months using Pro Tools. The band also hired Full Sail University graduate Shilpa Patel, whom Jay Stanley referred to as the "Queen of Pro Tools", as a studio technician to help the band record and mix the album.

During recording sessions for the song "Who's Got My Back?", the band enlisted the services of Cherokee musician Bo Taylor, an avowed Creed fan who Stapp brought in personally from a reservation who was fluent in ancient Cherokee chants, to do an ancient sounding Cherokee Indian prayer for the intro of the song. The band played a demo of the song for Taylor, and after a lengthy conversation about its meaning Stapp had Taylor do four to five chants in the studio until settling on the first take. Stapp also brought in his sister Aimee to sing backing vocals on "Don't Stop Dancing", as well as the Tallahassee Boys' Choir. Jay Stanley, who was sporadically present during the recording sessions, recalls his initial impression of hearing early demo recordings of the songs, specifically the album's lead single "My Sacrifice", one of the earliest songs written for the album.

"I came and went [during the four months] checking on equipment, and troubleshooting gear…as I heard the demos coming together, I was impressed. The first time I heard "My Sacrifice" I knew it was going to be huge." — Stanley

At the time, the group was halfway through recording its new album when the attacks of September 11, 2001, occurred. According to Producer John Kurzweg, the mood quickly changed and intensified following the attacks. Kurzweg said "We tried to go forward and do the best we could, but all the songs were written before. Not one lyric was changed." In response to the terrorist attacks, touring bassist Brett Hestla, along with his own band who were known simply as Virgos during this period, wrote a tribute song to those affected called "Brother of Mine", which was included on their only album, The Path of Least Resistance. The song featured Tremonti and Phillips on guitar and keyboards, respectively. Another version of the song also features Stapp sharing vocal duties with Hestla.

== Music and lyrics ==
Stapp describes the album as "two records in one" and "a very extreme record", as it features some of Creed's heaviest songs, such as the opening track and second single "Bullets", as well as some of the band's most uplifting numbers, including their hit lead single "My Sacrifice", and the album's closing track, "Lullaby". Manager Jeff Hanson described the album as Creed's version of The Joshua Tree, feeling it would be the record that would set the band apart and have the epic scope and impact of the classic U2 album. With bassist Brian Marshall no longer in the band, Tremonti played bass guitar for all the songs on the album in his absence. Tremonti and the band's approach to the album's musical style came with the intent of creating meaningful songs that would move people, rather than the more upbeat, popular rock music scene at the time. He credits the band's moody, somber, and darker sound, in contrast to other popular contemporary rock acts of the time such as Third Eye Blind, Semisonic, and Marcy Playground, with contributing to the band's success early in their careers.

The album opens with "Bullets", an anthemic heavy metal track that features some of Tremonti's fastest and most aggressive guitar work for Creed. Stapp wrote the lyrics about what he felt were unjust criticisms that Creed had received throughout their careers from critics and the press. "Bullets" is followed by "Freedom Fighter", at only 2 minutes and 36 seconds the band's shortest song ever recorded. In between the first and second verse of the song, a muffled voice can be heard reciting the lyrics from the bridge section of "Wash Away Those Years", from the Human Clay album.

The album's third track, the eight-minute epic "Who's Got My Back?", is the longest song the band ever recorded and one of their most experimental tracks. The song was written by Stapp, who was inspired to reconnect with his own Cherokee heritage. The song opens with a Cherokee Indian prayer by Bo Taylor that, according to Stapp, was "so moving to me. It literally brings tears to my eyes every time I hear it."

The band continues to explore dark themes on track five of the album with their hit single "One Last Breath", a song which Tremonti cited as one of his favourite guitar lines and musical compositions from Creed. According to Stapp, the song is about someone crying out for help, realizing the mistakes they've made in their past, and your friends being there for you to lean on. Stapp also expresses sentiments about how in the minds of "normal, well-adjusted" people, any thoughts of moving beyond this life are not real, and how these surreal thoughts are just flashes-in-the-pan and they would never act upon them.

Track six, "My Sacrifice", sees the band segue into more uplifting numbers on the second half of Weathered. Lyrically, the song explores Stapp's own personal struggles with battling substance abuse, addiction, and alcoholism and his coming to terms with his inability to stay sober despite his best efforts.

"Weathered", the album's title track and final single, was written by Stapp about feelings of sadness, bleakness and the pressures that came with living the rock star lifestyle while simultaneously having to conceal his rapidly deteriorating and unraveling mental state at the time from those around him.

"Yeah, and I think you could see that clearly in the Weathered album. The title and the lyrics on that record absolutely relate to that - "I'm rusted and weathered, barely holding together, I'm covered with skin that peels and it just won't heal" - that was me sharing my heart and soul. I guess I'd learned how to flip the switch when I had to." — Stapp

The final two tracks, "Don't Stop Dancing" and "Lullaby", close out the album on a soft note. "Don't Stop Dancing", the album's fourth single, is a power ballad where Stapp lyrically expresses feelings of invisibility and insignificance in the world. The song features Stapp's sister Aimee Stapp on backing vocals during the bridge and the Tallahassee Boys' Choir singing a background chorus. The album's closing track, "Lullaby", is one of Creed's softest numbers. It is an acoustic duet track featuring only Tremonti on guitar and Stapp on vocals, making it the band's only song not to feature drums or bass guitar. Musically the song is a soothing piece similar to that of an actual lullaby, while in the lyrics Stapp tells the listener to "Just give love to all".

== Title, artwork and packaging ==
Alternate cover artwork for Weathered with the enlarged solid white wordmark and album title, and Mark Tremonti's head carved facing to the right.

The album title, according to Stapp, was chosen by the band as it was felt that it represented where they were at the time. Stapp states "The band was splitting apart. My struggles, and Brian [Marshall]’s struggles with other issues outside the band really defined where we were as a group." Stapp noted there was nothing pre-planned with regard to the title, but that it was something honest and that "just came out." Mark Tremonti also added that the band was beginning to go through the initial stages of their eventual break-up, and that "It was probably the darkest time for the band."

The artwork for the album was designed by Mark Tremonti's brother, Daniel Tremonti, who designed all of the band's album covers. The front cover depicts an unknown man in the foreground holding a hammer and chisel while carving the faces of Stapp, Tremonti, and Phillips into the wood of a heavily mossed tree. Some versions of the cover have Tremonti's head carved facing to the right, with the wordmark now centred and slightly larger, in solid white, and the album title, also enlarged, at the bottom with a black drop shadow.

As with the artwork for their previous album, Human Clay, the artwork for Weathered was incorporated into an online interactive game called Creed Quest. Daniel Tremonti devised the original concept and had been working with the band on design and marketing concepts since the Blue Collar Records version of My Own Prison. Tremonti's marketing and design firm, Three Mountain Group, was the game's developer. Soon after the release of the album in late 2001, banner ads and mysterious posts began appearing on Creed fan sites, which redirected users to a website called creedquest.com. Creed Quest officially launched on January 21, 2002, and after just a couple of weeks boasted over 40,000 participants. Creed Quest was broken down into eight weekly installments, and was played on a points system, whereby points were accumulated by successfully completing tasks, challenges, answering questions about the band, and unraveling mysteries surrounding a different fictitious short story each week. Players with the most points were then eligible for weekly prizes and one grand prize — a trip to Universal Studios Orlando for lunch with the band, among other activities. The foundation for Creed Quest had been laid years in advance prior to the release of Human Clay. Clues for the contest could be obtained in various Creed songs and album artwork, such as the clocks seen throughout the liner notes of Human Clay. Other prizes included signed items, watches, sunglasses, and props such as the granite slab with "Weathered" carved into it that is seen in the artwork for the liner notes of Weathered.

== Promotion, release, and commercial performance ==
To promote the album, the band made numerous television appearances, including a spot as musical guests on the November 17, 2001, episode of Saturday Night Live where they played "Bullets" and "My Sacrifice". They also played the halftime show at the 2001 Dallas Cowboys' annual Thanksgiving Day football game on November 22. The band performed a medley of their songs "My Sacrifice", "Don't Stop Dancing", and their 1999 hit single "Higher". On December 2, the band once again performed "My Sacrifice" at the 2001 My VH1 Music Awards and on the December 3, 2001, episode of The Tonight Show with Jay Leno.

Weathered was released on November 20, 2001, becoming the band's second album to top the charts in the US, debuting at number one on the Billboard 200. The album sold 887,000 copies in its first week of release, making it the second-highest-selling album of 2001 for first-week sales. By the end of 2001 the album had managed to sell over 4 million units in the US, being certified 4× platinum by the RIAA on December 19, and closed out the year of 2001 with sales of 555,092 units for the week of December 29. The album remained in the top spot for eight consecutive weeks until the week of February 2, 2002, when it was finally knocked off the top spot by Alan Jackson's album Drive, which at the time made them only the third artist in the Soundscan Era to have an album debut at number one and hold onto the spot for eight or more consecutive weeks. Weathered finished number 2 on the 2002 US Billboard 200 year-end chart, and was eventually certified 6× platinum by the RIAA for sales of over 6 million units sold in the US alone on January 6, 2003. In 2001 the album was the 15th best-selling album globally, selling 4.9 million copies.

Like its predecessor, the singles from Weathered were also commercially successful. The album's lead single, "My Sacrifice", released on October 16, 2001, gave the band their third top ten hit on the US Billboard Hot 100 and their second-highest-charting single on the Hot 100 (after "With Arms Wide Open") as it entered the top ten at the end of 2001 and peaked at number 4 in the week of February 9, 2002. It also topped the Mainstream Rock Tracks chart for nine consecutive weeks, starting in December 2001. The album's second single, "Bullets", experienced moderate chart success, reaching number 11 and 27 on the U.S. Billboard Mainstream Rock Tracks and Modern Rock Tracks, respectively. "One Last Breath" was released as the third single on April 15, 2002, and was a massive commercial hit both in the US and internationally. The song peaked at number 6 on the Billboard Hot 100 and reached the top five on the US Mainstream Rock Tracks, Mainstream Top 40 and Adult Top 40. Worldwide, the song peaked at number 43 in Australia and number 29 in New Zealand. In the United Kingdom and Ireland—where the song was released as a double A-side with "Bullets"—it peaked at number 47 on the UK Singles Chart and number 41 on the Irish Singles Chart. "Hide" was released in Australia only on July 1, 2002, reaching number 65 on the ARIA Singles Chart. "Don't Stop Dancing" was released as the fifth single in October 2002, reaching 24 on the US Adult Top 40 and 48 in Australia. The album's final single, the title track, was released the next month and peaked at number 7 on the US Mainstream Rock Tracks and 30 on the Alternative Airplay chart.

The album had four music videos created for it: "My Sacrifice" in 2001, followed by "Bullets", "One Last Breath", and "Don't Stop Dancing" in 2002. A two-disc version of Weathered was released and contained a VCD with three music videos made for Creed's second studio album Human Clay.

== Critical reception ==
Professional ratings
Review scores
Source	Rating
AllMusic	2/5 stars
Cross Rhythms	10/10 stars
Entertainment Weekly	C−
The Guardian	3/5 stars
Rock Hard	8/10 stars
Rolling Stone	3.5/5 stars
Slant Magazine	2/5 stars

The album received mixed reviews, with some critics feeling that the album lacked creativity and liveliness, labeling Weathered as being "unimaginative", "predictable" and too serious and pretentious. Stephen Thomas Erlewine of AllMusic wrote in his 2 out of 5 star review that: "Their hearts are in the right place -- let it never be said that they're only in this for the money or the fame; they even advertise Stapp's With Arms Wide Open Foundation charity in the liner notes -- but the earnestness in their approach is magnified by their resolutely unimaginative neo-grunge." Although he praises the band's more experimental efforts noting the Cherokee Indian prayer on "Who's Got My Back" and bringing in the Tallahassee Boys' Choir for "Don't' Stop Dancing", he felt Creed had failed to break from their template and that the album was "simply another Creed record." Slant Magazine also gave the album 2 out of 5 stars, with reviewer Sal Cinquemani praising the track "Bullets", but felt many songs including "My Sacrifice", "Freedom Fighter" and "Lullaby" were overly self-righteous and that "the song's message gets lost in the same hollow pit of obscurity as the band's previously uplifting efforts." He also praised the song "Who's Got My Back", but states that the song predictably trumpets into typical testosterone-rock.

Some reviewers were more receptive to the album, commending the band's restrained, and morose approach as well as the nuance of the album. James Hunter of Rolling Stone gave the album 3 and half stars out of 5, citing tracks such as "My Sacrifice", "Who's Got My Back" and "Stand Here With Me" as album highlights. He writes: "Weathered is rock of unusual focus and arrest, a beautifully distressed dance of sustained style and unapologetic emotion." Caroline Sullivan of The Guardian gave the album 3 out of 5 stars. She notes that although the album's lack of levity begins to take its toll over the course of the record, Weathered is still worth listening to "for those who want a dose of spirituality with their nu metal." In his 8 out of 10 star review of the album, Thomas Kupfer of Rock Hard states: "The new album proves once again that Creed doesn't work according to the truisms of big business. As with its predecessors, the production was carried out under the guidance of producer John Kurzweg and the original sound was only refined with nuances." He asserts that the title track is the band's "most compact performance of the trio to date", as well as praising some of the calmer moments on the album including "Who's Got My Back".

== Tour ==
The Weathered tour kicked off on January 16, 2002, with an hour special VH1 "Opening Night Live" performance in Atlanta, Georgia, at the Philips Arena. The program also featured interviews by radio and television personality Aamer Haleem with Stapp, Tremonti and drummer Scott Phillips in Florida. After a successful opening night, the tour quickly hit its first snag just two weeks later when on January 30, Mark Tremonti's mother died, forcing the band to reschedule their February 1 performance in East Rutherford, New Jersey at the Continental Airlines Arena. On February 19, 2002, Creed played at the 2002 Winter Olympics in Salt Lake City, Utah, during the medals ceremony. The band mostly performed songs from Weathered as well as songs from their previous two albums. American dates continued until February 23, when the band performed their rescheduled show in East Rutherford, New Jersey. The band then embarked on a half dozen international tour dates in March in Australia and New Zealand.

The band returned to the US and had originally planned to do more shows in April, followed by a European tour in May and June, and then a full-scale North American run from July until the fall. But on April 19, Stapp was involved in a serious automobile accident when he was on his way to shoot the video for "One Last Breath". At around 1:40 in the afternoon, Stapp, while driving his Cadillac SUV on Interstate 4 in Florida, was struck from behind by a Ford SUV. Stapp's vehicle was rear-ended by the other vehicle that, according to Stapp, was going at "probably 50 or 60 miles per hour,". Stapp was sent flying forward in his vehicle, with his body hitting the steering wheel and his head hitting the windshield. The officer on the scene reported no injuries, but Stapp soon realized he had not gone unscathed while calling his manager after the accident. He suffered a concussion from the whiplash and from hitting the windshield. Although severely injured, Stapp still managed to show up the next day and shoot the music video, but the band's April shows as well as the European tour had to be cancelled. Things went bad to worse after an MRI later revealed the extent of Stapp's injuries including a bulging disk between two vertebrae in his neck, a smashed disk in his lower back, and an adjacent missing disk from a congenital condition that likely worsened the situation.

Creed resumed the North American portion of their tour starting on July 11 in Norfolk, Virginia. During the fall portion of their tour, the band hit yet another bump in the road when Stapp was diagnosed with acute laryngitis due to the swelling of his vocal cords. Creed was forced to postpone nine dates at the beginning of their fall tour and almost had to pull out of a live performance at Alcatraz Island off of the San Francisco coast on October 10. However, the band still played the show since they had booked the show two weeks prior as a favor to VH1 when the previously scheduled artist canceled at the last minute. Before the show, Stapp was given a shot of anti-inflammatory medication Decadron, to temporarily ease the swelling of his vocal cords, and the set had to be shortened then what was originally planned. Stapp lamented that "This ambitious tour schedule ultimately proved to be too aggressive,".

=== Allstate Arena incident ===
As the band wrapped up their tour in December 2002, the band played one of their most infamous shows on the 29th at the Allstate Arena in Chicago, Illinois, where Stapp suffered a mental breakdown on stage, forcing the band to cut the set short just three songs in. Prior to the performance Stapp, who was addicted to painkillers and battling alcoholism at the time, mixed his medication with alcohol causing him to become inebriated. As Stapp stumbled onto the stage, he was so intoxicated that he began rolling around, laying flat on his back while struggling to get back up, was unable to sing any of the lyrics to the songs, slammed his microphone on the ground, and at one point even passed out mid-performance. The audience began to heavily boo Stapp as he proceeded to leave the stage, only to return ten minutes later and miss all of his cues, causing the rest of the band to improvise by playing a number of unplanned solos. Although the band issued an apology to their fans via email, they soon found themselves involved in a lawsuit with two of the audience members from the show, Philip Berenz and Chad Costino, who alleged that Creed owed refunds to the 15,000 members of the audience, totalling $2 million in damages. Although the lawsuit was ultimately thrown out by the court, the band's reputation had been badly damaged. Creed played their final show of the tour on December 31, 2002, with 3 Doors Down. In June 2004, the band announced their break-up.

== Track listing ==
All the tracks are produced, mixed and engineered by John Kurzweg, Kirk Kelsey and Creed, except where noted

=== Original release ===
All lyrics are written by Scott Stapp except where noted.; all music is composed by Mark Tremonti, except where noted.

No.	Title	Length
1.	"Bullets"	3:51
2.	"Freedom Fighter"	2:36
3.	"Who's Got My Back?"	8:25
4.	"Signs"	4:29
5.	"One Last Breath"	3:59
6.	"My Sacrifice"	4:54
7.	"Stand Here with Me"	4:17
8.	"Weathered"	5:30
9.	"Hide"	4:27
10.	"Don't Stop Dancing"	4:33
11.	"Lullaby"	3:04
Total length:		50:05

=== Bonus video CD ===
1. "With Arms Wide Open"
2. "Higher"
3. "What If"

=== Deluxe edition bonus tracks ===
No.	Title	Writer(s)	Producer(s)	Length
12.	"Riders on the Storm" (feat. Robby Krieger)	John Densmore; Krieger; Ray Manzarek; Jim Morrison	Ralph Sall	6:18
13.	"My Sacrifice" (Radio Edit)			4:19
14.	"Weathered" (Edit)			4:51
15.	"Don't Stop Dancing" (Acoustic Version)			3:41

== Personnel ==
Creed

- Scott Stapp – lead vocals, production, mixing, engineering
- Mark Tremonti – guitars, bass, production, mixing, engineering
- Scott Phillips – drums, keyboards, production, mixing, engineering

Additional contributors

- John Kurzweg – production, mixing, engineering, additional keyboards
- Kirk Kesley – production, mixing, engineering
- Bob Ludwig – mastering
- Shilpa Patel – studio technician
- Bobby Selvaggio – studio engineering
- Ernie Hudson – studio guitar technician
- Tony Adams – studio drum technician
- Andy Bender – studio assistance
- Daniel Tremonti – art direction, design, photography
- Matthew Grasse – photography
- Len Irish – band photo
- Stan Mullins – sculpture work
- Amie Stapp – backing vocals on "Don't Stop Dancing"
- Tallahassee Boys' Choir – choir on "Don't Stop Dancing"
- Bo Taylor – Cherokee Indian prayer on "Who's Got My Back?"

== Charts ==
=== Weekly charts ===
Weekly chart performance for Weathered
Chart (2001–2002)	Peak position
Australian Albums (ARIA)	3
Austrian Albums (Ö3 Austria)	8
Canadian Albums (Billboard)	3
Danish Albums (Hitlisten)	26
Dutch Albums (Album Top 100)	39
Europe (European Top 100 Albums)	20
Finnish Albums (Suomen virallinen lista)	35
French Albums (SNEP)	101
German Albums (Offizielle Top 100)	8
Irish Albums (IRMA)	16
New Zealand Albums (RMNZ)	4
Norwegian Albums (VG-lista)	23
Scottish Albums (Official Charts)	33
Singaporean Albums (RIAS)	9
Swedish Albums (Sverigetopplistan)	13
Swiss Albums (Schweizer Hitparade)	20
UK Albums (Official Charts)	44
UK Rock & Metal Albums (Official Charts)	4
US Billboard 200	1

=== Year-end charts ===
2001 year-end chart performance for Weathered
Chart (2001)	Position
Australian Albums (ARIA)	46
Canadian Albums (Nielsen SoundScan)	24

2002 year-end chart performance for Weathered
Chart (2002)	Position
Australian Albums (ARIA)	40
Austrian Albums (Ö3 Austria)	42
Canadian Albums (Nielsen SoundScan)	25
Canadian Alternative Albums (Nielsen SoundScan)	5
Canadian Metal Albums (Nielsen SoundScan)	3
German Albums (Offizielle Top 100)	75
New Zealand Albums (RMNZ)	13
UK Albums (OCC)	161
US Billboard 200	2

2003 year-end chart performance for Weathered
Chart (2003)	Position
US Billboard 200	182

=== Decade-end charts ===
Decade-end chart performance for Weathered
Chart (2000–2009)	Position
US Billboard 200	22

== Certifications ==
Certifications and sales for Weathered
Region	Certification	Certified units/sales
Australia (ARIA)	2× Platinum	140,000^{^}
Brazil (Pro-Música Brasil)	Platinum	125,000^{*}
Canada (Music Canada)	3× Platinum	300,000^{^}
Germany (BVMI)	Gold	150,000^{^}
New Zealand (RMNZ)	2× Platinum	30,000^{^}
United Kingdom (BPI)	Gold	100,000^{^}
United States (RIAA)	6× Platinum	6,000,000^{^}
^{*} Sales figures based on certification alone.^{^} Shipments figures based on certification alone.
