= Open D tuning =

Method of tuning a guitar

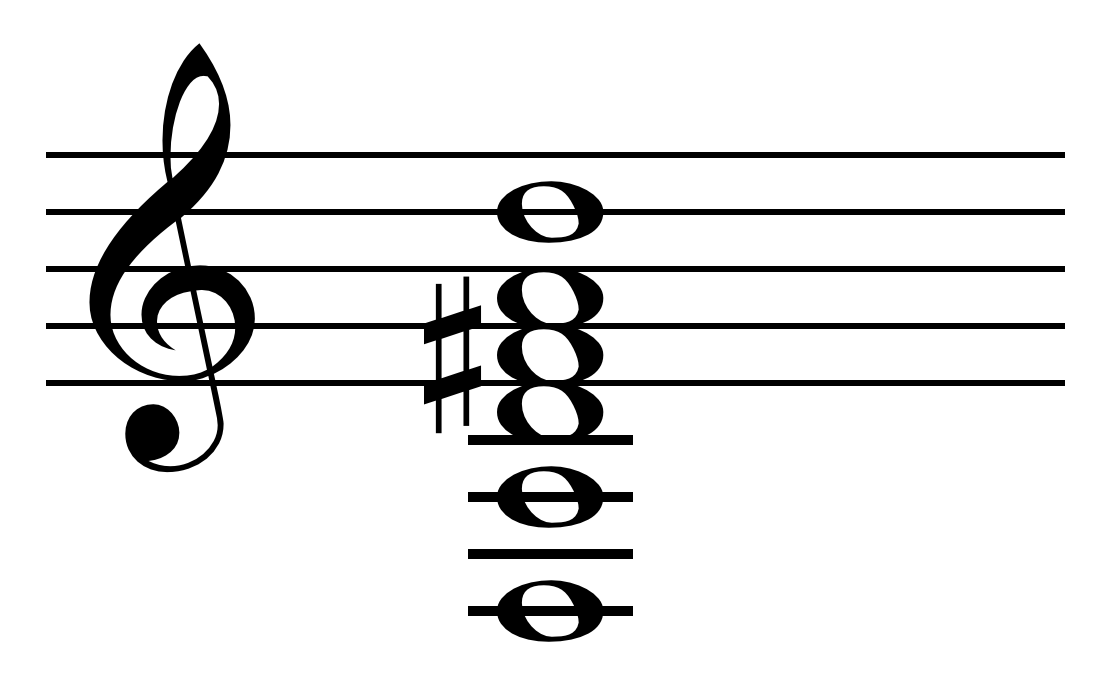
Open D tuning.

Open D tuning is an open tuning for the acoustic or electric guitar. The open string notes in this tuning are (from lowest to highest): D A D F♯ A D. It uses the three notes that form the triad of a D major chord: D (the root note), F♯ (the major third) and A (the perfect fifth).

To tune a guitar from standard tuning to open D tuning, lower the 1st (high-E) string down a full step to D, 2nd (B) string down a full step to A, 3rd (G) string down a half step to F♯, and 6th (low-E) string down a full step to D.

In this tuning, when the guitar is strummed without fretting any of the strings, a D major chord is sounded. This means that any major chord can be easily created using one finger, fretting all the strings at once (also known as barring); for example, fretting all the strings at the second fret will produce an E major chord, at the third fret an F major chord, and so on up the neck.

Open D tuning is very popular with slide guitar (or 'bottleneck') players, as it allows them to play complete chords using the slide. This tuning is also used in regular (non-slide) guitar playing. The full and vibrant sound it produces - particularly on an acoustic guitar - also makes it ideal for fingerstyle playing.

Many new chord shapes and sounds are available with open D tuning. It can offer a strong compositional element that produces tonal qualities markedly different from standard tuning. The full range of major and minor chords, with all their extensions, are available to the player. Many well-known guitarists have used this tuning at some point in their career. Neil Young, Richie Havens, Joni Mitchell, Bruce Cockburn, Barry Gibb, Jim O'Rourke and Jason Swain have all released recordings featuring this tuning. Elmore James used this tuning heavily. Stone Gossard from Pearl Jam uses this tuning when playing the rhythm guitar on "Even Flow" and "Oceans", from their Ten album. Broadbay use this tuning in all their songs. Mumford & Sons also use this tuning on their tracks "The Cave", "Awake My Soul" and "Roll Away Your Stone" from their album Sigh No More. Needtobreathe used it on some of their songs, most notably "Something Beautiful" from The Outsiders. Laura Marling uses the tuning on the title track of her 2010 album, I Speak Because I Can. Kevin Shields of My Bloody Valentine uses this tuning and its variations on many songs. Also, Alessio Frusta uses this tuning on the track "Freedom Island" from his 2015 album Pen Siero. Additionally, Switchfoot uses this tuning on the track "Daisy" from its 2005 album Nothing Is Sound, albeit lowered a half step (giving an open D♭ tuning with the same intervalic relationships as open D). Mitski uses this tuning for almost all her songs, while guitarists performing with her live often use standard tuning.

== Variations ==
=== F♯-A-D-F♯-A-D, Open D tuning with low F♯ ===
Used by some Brazilian sertanejo musicians on the acoustic guitar to approximate the sound of the viola caipira, a Brazilian country guitar with ten paired strings, traditionally tuned either A-D-F#-A-D or B-E-G#-B-E.

=== D-A-D-F♯-A-C♯, Open Dmaj7 tuning ===
This variant is achieved by lowering the high D string a half step to C♯ when tuned to open D. C♯ is the major seventh of the D major scale, hence the name. It also can be used for both fingerstyle and slide guitar work.

=== D-A-D-F-A-D, Open Dm tuning ===
This variant uses an F natural, the minor third.

This tuning has been used by Niko Wenner of Oxbow on the songs "Angel," "Cat and Mouse"; by Ian Thornley of Big Wreck on "Ladylike" and "Overemphasizing" and by Owen Campbell on "Sunshine Road".

DADFAD tuning is ideal for guitarists who are accompanying instruments that are tuned to minor scales, such as the Native American flute.

=== D-A-D-A-D-D, Open D5 tuning ===
This variant is used most notably by Mark Tremonti of Alter Bridge and Creed. Eight of the songs in which it is used are "Are You Ready?", "Faceless Man", "My Sacrifice", "Weathered", "Open Your Eyes", "Ghost of Days Gone By" (half-step down), "Life Must Go On", and “Fortress” (half-step down). It is also used on "Rain", "Brains", and "New Way Out", all tuned down 1 and a half steps (BF♯BF♯BB). Mark has mentioned in his instructional DVD that this tuning is one of his favorites because of its simplicity. It is also used by the Goo Goo Dolls in their song "Black Balloon", which was tuned down a half step on the album but played live in Open D5. "Without You", "Emotion Sickness" and "Paint Pastel Princess" by Australian band Silverchair also uses the Open D5 tuning, but down half a step. Fair to Midland use this tuning tuned down 1 full step (CGCGCC) and 1 1/2 steps (BF♯BF♯BB).

=== D-A-D-D-A-D ===
A variation on the above Open D5 tuning, is occasionally used by folk guitarists, such as Stephen Stills on the song "4+20". It has the advantage of a ringing pair of identical Ds on the third and fourth strings, which can be used to carry a melody line above a bed of D5 created by the other strings.

=== D-A-D-A-A-D ===
This tuning has been used by:

- Dave Wakeling of The Beat (known in North America as The English Beat) on the track "Save It For Later" from Special Beat Service as well as "Click Click" from the band's debut.
- Alex Lifeson of Canadian rock band Rush on the track "Hope" from Snakes & Arrows as well as Stone Gossard of American Rock Band Pearl Jam on the track "Let the Records Play".
- Allen Maslen, guitarist and multi-instrumentalist with the British folk-rock band Meet On The Ledge. Tracks with this tuning include Only Angels, Gas Street Shuffle, Freeze, The Litten Tree and One For His Nob.
- Ben Howard for the EP Old Pine.
- American rock band Rival Sons use this tuning on their 2019 song "Look Away".
- Owl City in his project Sky Sailing.
- Philip Toshio Sudo, who wrote the book "Zen Guitar".

=== D-D-D-A-D-F♯ ===
Nicknamed the "Wind of Change," this tuning was used by Peter Frampton on his song of the same name. Frampton discovered this tuning while browsing guitars at the home of George Harrison, who had a large collection of guitars in various tunings. When speaking of the tuning in an interview, Frampton said, "The low E and A strings drop down to D, the fourth string remains unchanged, the third string goes up to A, the second string up to D, and the first string up to F♯ , so there's a D triad on top and three Ds on the bottom. It's a very strange tuning, but oh my God, it sounds huge."
