= Stereo Fuse =

American post-grunge band

- Origin: Dallas, Texas, US
- Genres: Post-grunge
- Years active: 2000–present
- Labels: Wind-up; Toucan Cove
- Members: Jeff Quay; Chad Jenkins; Colin Hill; Rob Clark

Stereo Fuse is an American post-grunge band from Dallas, Texas, formed in 2000 by guitarist Jeff Quay and drummer Chad Jenkins. It includes vocalist Colin Hill and bassist Rob Clark. The band signed to Wind-up Records in 2002 and released the album Stereo Fuse. They followed it with All That Remains in 2006.

== Band members ==
- Colin Hill – vocals, acoustic guitar
- Jeff Quay – guitar
- Chad Jenkins – drums
- Rob Clark – bass, backing vocals

== Discography ==
Studio albums

- Stereo Fuse (2002)
- All That Remains (2006)

Singles

- "Superhero" (2002)
- "Everything" (2002)
- "Like I Do" (2006)
- "Beautiful" (2006)
