= Scream 3 (soundtrack) =

Soundtracks to the 2000 film Scream 3

Two albums were released to promote the 2000 slasher film Scream 3. The first one, consisting of an original soundtrack, was released as Scream 3: The Album by Wind-up Records on January 25, 2000. It features 18 songs, largely of the hard rock and nu metal genre, performed by artists such as Creed who served as the soundtrack's executive producers, System of a Down, Slipknot, Powerman 5000, Full Devil Jacket, Godsmack, Incubus, Fuel, Sevendust, Static-X and Coal Chamber, some of which are represented in the film. It was commercially successful, peaking at number 32 on the Billboard 200 charts, and also certified gold by the Recording Industry Association of America, signifying that the album achieved sales in excess of 500,000 units. The album was released on iTunes on February 1, 2012.

Marco Beltrami who scored the previous instalments had returned to score Scream 3. To complete the score within the deadline, he employed seven orchestrators and experimented with the recording of instruments in unusual circumstances such as physically and electronically altering the traditional sound of a piano while continuing to include a heavy vocal orchestra in his tracks. Scream 3: The Score is the original score album released by Varèse Sarabande on February 29, 2000.

== Soundtrack ==
Scream 3: The Album

Soundtrack album by various artists
- Released: January 25, 2000
- Recorded: 1997–1999
- Genres: Nu metal; alternative metal; hard rock
- Length: 73:11
- Label: Wind-up
- Producers: John Kurzweg; Ross Robinson; Slipknot; Arnold Lanni; Rick Rubin; System of a Down; Steve Jones; Murdock; Toby Wright; Sevendust; Sully Erna; Josh Abraham; Ulrich Wild; Static-X; Incubus; Scott Litt; Edsel Dope; Steve Haigler; Sylvia Massy; Powerman 5000; Malcolm Springer; Orgy; Jordan Schur; Fred Durst

=== Background ===
Apart from the metal genre songs, Nick Cave wrote a sequel to the song "Red Right Hand"—being heard in all three films as well as the 2022 reboot—which was playing in the closing credits, but was not included in the soundtrack. Beltrami also derived few notes from the song in his score. The American post-grunge band Creed also recorded "Is This the End" played in the end credits. The band's song "What If" was used in the film, and was promoted with a music video, resembling the events of the film and includes David Arquette reprising his role as Dewey Riley with Roger L. Jackson voicing Ghostface through archival audio recordings from the first Scream, which was used in the film's home media releases.

=== Reception ===
Professional ratings
Review scores
Source	Rating
AllMusic	2.5/5 stars
Kerrang!	2/5 stars

Writing for AllMusic, Steve Huey said that the "high pedigree" of the album's contributors had produced a "pretty listenable album" and gave 2.5 out of 5 to the album.

=== Track listing ===
Scream 3: The Album
No.	Title	Writer(s)	Producer(s)	Length
1.	"What If" (Creed)	Mark Tremonti; Scott Stapp	John Kurzweg	5:19
2.	"Wait and Bleed (Terry Date Mix)" (Slipknot)	Slipknot	Ross Robinson; Slipknot^{[a]}	2:32
3.	"Suffocate" (Finger Eleven)	James Black; Scott Anderson; Sean Anderson; Arnold Lanni	Arnold Lanni	3:50
4.	"Spiders" (System of a Down)	Daron Malakian; Serj Tankian	Rick Rubin; System of a Down^{[a]}	3:36
5.	"Automatic" (American Pearl)	Kevin Quinn; Noah Shain	GGGarth; Joe Barresi	3:34
6.	"Fall" (Sevendust)	Sevendust; Lajon Witherspoon^{[b]}; Morgan Rose^{[b]}; Clint Lowery^{[b]}	Sylvia Massy; Sevendust	5:22
7.	"Time Bomb" (Godsmack)	Sully Erna	Sully Erna; Mudrock^{[a]}	3:59
8.	"Tyler's Song" (Coal Chamber)	Dez Fafara; Miguel Rascón; Rayna Foss-Rose; Mike Cox	Josh Abraham	2:51
9.	"So Real" (Static-X)	Static-X	Ulrich Wild; Wayne Static	5:42
10.	"Crowded Elevator" (Incubus)	Brandon Boyd; Michael Einziger; Alex Katunich; Chris Kilmore; José Pasillas	Scott Litt; Incubus	4:44
11.	"Debonaire" (Dope)	Edsel Dope	Edsel Dope; John Travis	2:34
12.	"Sunburn" (Fuel)	Carl Bell	Steven Haigler	4:25
13.	"Get On, Get Off" (Powerman 5000)	Powerman 5000; Spider One^{[b]}	Sylvia Massy; Powerman 5000	3:37
14.	"Wanna' Be Martyr" (Full Devil Jacket)	Josh Brown; Full Devil Jacket	Malcolm Springer	3:23
15.	"Dissention" (Orgy)	Jay Gordon; Amir Derakh; Bobby Hewitt; Ryan Shuck; Paige Haley	Josh Abraham; Orgy	3:32
16.	"Crawl" (Staind)	Mike Mushok; Johnny April; Aaron Lewis^{[b]}; Jon Wysocki	Terry Date; Staind	4:32
17.	"Click Click" (Ear2000)	David Arquette; Gabriel Cowan; Sam Music	Ear2000	3:15
18.	"Is This the End" (Creed)	Tremonti; Stapp	John Kurzweg	6:15
Total length:				73:11

Notes

- ^{^[a]} signifies a co-producer
- ^{^[b]} signifies a lyricist

=== Personnel ===
- David Bianco – mixing (8)
- David Boucher – mixing (17)
- Bob Clearmountain – mixing (17)
- Terry Date – mixing (2, 16)
- Edsel Dope – mixing (11)
- Paul David Hager – engineer and mixing (14)
- Steven Haigler – engineer (12)
- Scott Humphrey – mixing (13)
- John Kurzweg – engineer and mixing (1, 18)
- Arnold Lanni – engineer and mixing (3)
- Scott Litt – mixing (10)
- Chris Lord-Alge – mixing (5)
- Tom Lord-Alge – mixing (12)
- Rodger Manning – additional music (17)
- Dave Ogilvie – mixing (15)
- The Other Brothers – remixing (17)
- D. Sardy – mixing (4)
- John Travis – mixing (11)
- Andy Wallace – mixing (6)
- Ulrich Wild – engineer and mixing (9)
- Rick Will – mixing (10)

=== Charts ===
Chart (2000)	Peak position
US Billboard 200	32

=== Certifications ===
Region	Certification	Certified units/sales
United States (RIAA)	Gold	500,000^{^}
^{^} Shipments figures based on certification alone.

== Score ==
Scream 3: The Score

Film score by Marco Beltrami
- Released: February 29, 2000
- Genre: Film score
- Length: 46:30
- Label: Varèse Sarabande
- Producer: Marco Beltrami

Marco Beltrami chronology
The Crow: Salvation (1999)	Scream 3 (2000)	The Incorporated (2000)

Unlike the score for the first two installments, which had been released into a single dual album, the score for Scream 3 was compiled into a single album. Varèse Sarabande issued the score album on February 29, 2000, consisted of 22 tracks that ran for over 33 minutes, though much of the score has been excluded from the album. Like its predecessor, Beltrami incorporated excerpts of the score to Broken Arrow by Hans Zimmer in the track "Sid Wears a Dress".

=== Reception ===
Writing for Filmtracks.com, Christian Clemmensen commented "Beltrami's score for Scream 3 overachieves and is one of the few true bright spots in an otherwise forgettable sequel". Gregory Heaney of AllMusic awarded the Scream 3 score 2.5 out of 5 and said "Scream 3 has a nail-biter of a score, blending eeriness with just the right amount of aggression to create the kind of nervy atmosphere that's essential to any slasher film. This is the score for any horror junkie looking to relive the thrills and chills of this now classic film, or for anyone who just wants the feeling of being chased." Music critic Jonathan Broxton awarded four stars out of five, summarising "this is a much more satisfying listen than any of the previous Scream incarnations, mainly because its length allows the listener to appreciate the full scope of Beltrami's efforts. The excitement of the violent stalk-and-kill cues and the shock-jump ferocity is nicely balanced with the more reflective moments, resulting in a well-rounded, highly enjoyable album that more than does justice to the film it represents."

=== Later releases ===
On January 7, 2022, Beltrami score for the first four films in the Scream franchise was released in a limited edition box set of 1,800 units. The score for Scream 3 was compiled in a two-disc album (disc 3 and 4), in its entirety, that runs for one-and-a-half hour. Unlike, its predecessors, which saw a separate "deluxe edition" release for the full score. A vinyl box set was later released on June 10, 2022, although only 44 minutes of music were present.

=== Track listing ===
Scream 3 – original track listing
No.	Title	Length
1.	"Here We Go Again"	0:44
2.	"Cotton Gets Picked"	2:19
3.	"DoppleGailer"	1:28
4.	"On the Set"	0:51
5.	"Home Sweet Home"	2:02
6.	"Comparing Photos"	1:23
7.	"Mother's Watching"	1:51
8.	"Dewey Mobile"	1:07
9.	"At the Station"	3:14
10.	"Ghost Attacks"	3:22
11.	"The Fall Girl"	0:47
12.	"Roman Around1"	0:50
13.	"All In the Family"	0:37
14.	"Pied a Terror"	1:47
15.	"Sunset Pictures"	1:46
16.	"Last Call"	3:20
17.	"Gail Force"	0:55
18.	"Stone Cold"	0:32
19.	"Sid Wears a Dress"	2:50
20.	"Sid's Theme (Reprise)"	0:49
Total length:		32:34

Scream 3 – limited edition box set track listing
No.	Title	Length
1.	"Here We Go Again"	0:49
2.	"Cotton Car"	2:26
3.	"100% Scared"	2:25
4.	"Cotton Gets Picked"	2:21
5.	"Home On the Range"	2:00
6.	"Gale Meets Kincaid"	1:07
7.	"Gale Arrives"	0:31
8.	"Sunset Pictures"	1:46
9.	"Dewey and the Gales"	1:02
10.	"Gale Kicked Off Set"	0:48
11.	"Dad Brings Home The Bacon"	1:02
12.	"Sidney's Nightmare"	1:56
13.	"BooBalicious"	0:57
14.	"Candy Phone"	1:53
15.	"Candy Ain't So Sweet"	0:54
16.	"Kincaid at Crime Scene"	0:50
17.	"Three Different Scripts"	0:26
18.	"The Fall of Roman"	1:09
19.	"Killer Calls Sidney (Again)"	1:25
20.	"Gale Spies On Dewey"	1:27
21.	"Comparing Photos"	1:26
22.	"Stone Cold Dead"	3:59
23.	"Roll With It"	2:45
24.	"Sid Arrives"	2:33
25.	"On the Set"	0:47
26.	"Randy Speaks"	2:51
27.	"Searching"	1:02
28.	"Leia and the Stormtroopers"	1:22
29.	"Sid in the Can"	2:06
30.	"Home Sweet Home"	1:46
31.	"Killer in the Closet"	2:34
32.	"Mother's Room"	0:59
33.	"The Fall Girl"	1:09
34.	"Milton Takes Meetings"	3:05
35.	"At the Station"	3:14
36.	"Dewey Mobile"	2:07
37.	"Roman Around"	3:20
38.	"The Killer's Phone"	2:20
39.	"Ghostface Attacks"	2:24
40.	"Ghostface vs. Jennifer"	1:16
41.	"Dewey Falls for Gale"	2:20
42.	"Sidney's Call"	3:20
43.	"Sidney Joins the Party"	4:33
44.	"Sid and Ghostface"	1:44
45.	"Boom Boom Out Go Lights"	4:43
46.	"All in the Family"	3:41
47.	"Sid Wears a Dress"	2:47
48.	"Doppelgaler (Extra Cue)"	1:00
49.	"Sid's Theme (Reprise / Extra Cue)"	0:50
50.	"SCREAM 3: Sunset Pictures (Alternate Edit)"	0:54
51.	"Ghostface Attacks / Ghostface vs. Jennifer / Dewey Falls for Gale (Original Demo Suite)"	7:49
Total length:		1:44:00

Scream 3 – limited edition vinyl box set track listing
No.	Title	Length
1.	"Here We Go Again"	0:49
2.	"Cotton Car"	2:25
3.	"Cotton Gets Picked"	2:22
4.	"Home On the Range"	2:00
5.	"Sunset Pictures (full version)"	1:46
6.	"Sidney's Nightmare"	1:56
7.	"Candy Ain't So Sweet"	0:54
8.	"Gale Spies On Dewey"	1:27
9.	"Comparing Photos"	1:26
10.	"On the Set"	0:49
11.	"Home Sweet Home"	1:46
12.	"Killer in the Closet"	2:32
13.	"Mother's Room"	1:00
14.	"The Fall Girl"	1:09
15.	"Gale & Dewey Drive to Milton a.k.a At the Station"	3:14
16.	"Dewey Mobile"	2:07
17.	"Ghostface Attacks"	2:24
18.	"Ghostface vs. Jennifer"	1:16
19.	"Sidney's Call"	3:20
20.	"Boom Boom Out Go Lights"	4:43
21.	"Sid Wears a Dress"	2:47
22.	"Sid's Theme (reprise)"	0:50
Total length:		42:09

== See also ==
- Music of the Scream franchise
