= What If (Creed song) =

2000 single by Creed

Single by Creed

from the album Human Clay and Scream 3: The Album
- Released: January 4, 2000
- Length: 5:18 (album version); 4:51 (radio edit)
- Label: Wind-up
- Songwriters: Scott Stapp; Mark Tremonti
- Producer: John Kurzweg

Creed singles chronology
"Higher" (1999)	"What If" (2000)	"With Arms Wide Open" (2000)

Music video
- "What If" on YouTube

"What If" is a song by American rock band Creed. It was released on January 4, 2000, as the second single from their second studio album, Human Clay (1999), and as the lead single from Scream 3: The Album (2000), the first of two albums released to promote the 2000 slasher film Scream 3. Written by singer Scott Stapp and guitarist Mark Tremonti, the song has been compared to "Bullets" from the band's third studio album, Weathered (2001).

"What If" was similarly successful to the other three singles from Human Clay. While not entering the US Billboard Hot 100, the song peaked at No. 15 on the Billboard Modern Rock Tracks chart, No. 3 on the Billboard Mainstream Rock Tracks chart, and No. 2 on the Billboard Bubbling Under Hot 100.

== Music video ==
The music video was directed by David Meyers and it features David Arquette reprising his role as Dewey Riley with Roger L. Jackson also reprising his role as Ghostface through archival audio snippets from Scream (1996). The story revolves around Dewey investigating an alleged Ghostface sighting at Sunrise Studios, the fictional studio lot seen in Scream 3 where the Stab films were filmed, after he gets a call from the killer at 11:36 pm and witnesses a female survivor escape. Around the same time, each member of Creed starts getting attacked by the killer while their respective girlfriends quickly flee, only for them and Dewey to realize that the band created the prank. The real killer calls Dewey again before he attacks him from above as the video cuts to black. The music video can be found in the home media releases of Scream 3.

== Track listings ==
US CD single

1. "What If" (album version) – 5:18
2. "What If" (radio edit) – 4:51

== Charts ==
=== Weekly charts ===
Weekly chart performance for "What If"
Chart (2000)	Peak position
US Bubbling Under Hot 100 (Billboard)	2
US Alternative Airplay (Billboard)	15
US Mainstream Rock (Billboard)	3

=== Year-end charts ===
Year-end chart performance for "What If"
Chart (2000)	Position
US Mainstream Rock Tracks (Billboard)	11
US Modern Rock Tracks (Billboard)	49
