= Bullets (Creed song) =

2002 single by Creed

Single by Creed

from the album Weathered
- Released: February 23, 2002
- Recorded: 2001
- Genre: Alternative metal
- Length: 3:49
- Label: Wind-up
- Songwriters: Mark Tremonti; Scott Stapp
- Producers: John Kurzweg; Kirk Kelsey

Creed singles chronology
"My Sacrifice" (2001)	"Bullets" (2002)	"One Last Breath" (2002)

Music video
- "Bullets" on YouTube

"Bullets" is the second single from Creed's third album, Weathered. The song serves as the opening track to the album and is considered to be one of the band's heaviest songs.

== Writing and recording ==
Along with entirety of the Weathered album, "Bullets" was written during four-hour sessions in vocalist Scott Stapp's living room as well as on his Sea Ray cruiser over the course of a three-week period, with Stapp contributing the lyrics and guitarist Mark Tremonti composing the music. The band recorded and mixed the song along with the album at J. Stanley Productions Inc. recording studio in Ocoee, Florida, over a four-month period in the summer and early fall of 2001.

== Music and lyrics ==
"Bullets" is an anthemic and forceful heavy metal track that features some of Tremonti's fastest and most aggressive guitar work for Creed. Stapp described the song as "the heaviest, most intense music we've ever written." The lyrics were written by Stapp about what he felt were unjust criticisms that the band had received throughout their careers from critics and the press. In the song, Stapp asks of them to "At least look at me when you shoot a bullet through my head!", inferring that if someone has something negative to say about them to do it to their faces.

== Music video ==
A video was also released with the single which was also aired on MTV as a follow-up to Creed's first single, "My Sacrifice". Developed by Vision Scape Interactive, the team behind games such as Twisted Metal 4, were responsible for characterizing and developing the storyline in the video with the band. The team spent $473,000, and dedicated 15 employees working more than 18 hours a day to complete the project, according to Matt McDonald, President of Vision Scape. The roots for the video were laid a year prior, when McDonald and his wife Tammy saw the Creed Behind the Music episode. The McDonald's, intrigued with the energy and message of the band, contacted Creed, through Mark Tremonti's younger brother Daniel Tremonti, to see if they were interested in contributing music for an eventually canceled video game called "Revelations". Daniel would later call back, informing Vision Scape that the band wanted them to create a music video using the visuals from "Revelations".

The video sees digitized versions of Stapp, Tremonti, and drummer Scott Philips do battle with legions of demons, metal-plated beasts and giant, saber-toothed spiders. Much of the imagery in the video is meant to reflect the way the band dealt with criticism, including the bullets Stapp is peppered with by demons meant to symbolize negative comments from critics and journalists directed at the band. According to Matt McDonald, it was very important to the band members that they were depicted accurately and to their liking, including their tattoos and the weapons they used. Tremonti's character was given a battle-axe to represent his guitar, while Philips was given two swords, with the designs on the swords inspired by his tattoos, to represent his drumsticks. Much of the footage was modeled after fight scenes from Crouching Tiger, Hidden Dragon and Iron Monkey. Originally the character model for Stapp was designed more like an Archangel, featuring a very futuristic look and metallic wings. However, Stapp wanted the design to have more "earthy" look to it, feeling it would better fit the art style of the Weathered album, as well as bring attention to his Cherokee roots and heritage, so the team redesigned his model so his wings would appear more like those of an eagle or a hawk.

== Release and reception ==
The song was released as the second single to the Weathered album, and was the follow-up to the band's highly successful lead single "My Sacrifice". Stapp said the reasoning behind choosing "Bullets" as the follow-up single was that the band always looked to establish themselves as a rock band with a heavier side, and that the band would often go back to their heavier rock roots with the second single of an album as a tribute to the active rock and hard rock stations that gave them their big break. Tremonti praised the single feeling it exhibited the diversity of the band's sound. He stated "It's great to show the range of our style because 'Bullets' is such a different sound than our first single."

Although not as successful on the charts as its predecessor, "Bullets" managed to reach number 11 on the Billboard Mainstream Rock chart and 27 on the Modern Rock chart. The song was also released as a double A-side in the United Kingdom and Ireland, along with the band's next single "One Last Breath", where the latter would peak at number 47 on the UK Singles Chart and 41 on the Irish Singles Chart.

== Appearances in media ==
To promote the Weathered album Creed performed "Bullets", along "My Sacrifice", on the November 17, 2001, episode of Saturday Night Live, where they were featured as musical guests. "Bullets" was also played as the opening song during the band's first show of the Weathered tour, an hour special VH1 "Opening Night Live" performance in Atlanta, Georgia, at the Philips Arena on January 16, 2002. The song was once again played as the opener for the band's performance at the 2002 Winter Olympics closing ceremony in Salt Lake City, Utah, on February 19, 2002.

== Charts ==
=== Weekly charts ===
Weekly chart performance for "Bullets"
Chart (2002)	Peak position
US Alternative Airplay (Billboard)	27
US Mainstream Rock (Billboard)	11

=== Year-end charts ===
Year-end chart performance for "Bullets"
Chart (2002)	Position
US Active Rock (Billboard)	60
