= Don't Stop Dancing =

2002 single by Creed

Single by Creed

from the album Weathered
- B-side: "With Arms Wide Open"
- Released: November 11, 2002
- Length: 4:33
- Label: Wind-up
- Songwriters: Scott Stapp; Mark Tremonti
- Producer: John Kurzweg

Creed singles chronology
"Hide" (2002)	"Don't Stop Dancing" (2002)	"Weathered" (2002)

Music video
- "Don't Stop Dancing" on YouTube

"Don't Stop Dancing" is a song by American rock band Creed from third album, Weathered (2001). The song features Scott Stapp's sister Aimee Stapp on backup vocals and the Tallahassee Boys' Choir singing a background chorus.

== Music video ==
The music video was directed by Dave Meyers and co-directed by Scott Stapp. It was filmed at one of Hoboken, New Jersey's oldest churches on July 28 and 29, 2002. It features cameo appearances by Scott's son, Jagger, and Scott's sister, Aimee.

== Charts ==
=== Weekly charts ===
Weekly chart performance for "Don't Stop Dancing"
Chart (2003)	Peak position
Australia (ARIA)	48
Canada (Nielsen Soundscan)	12
US Adult Pop Airplay (Billboard)	24

=== Year-end charts ===
2002 year-end chart performance for "Don't Stop Dancing"
Chart (2002)	Position
Canada (Nielsen SoundScan)	51

2003 year-end chart performance for "Don't Stop Dancing"
Chart (2003)	Position
Brazil (Crowley)	49
US Adult Top 40 (Billboard)	71

== Release history ==
Region	Date	Format(s)	Label(s)	Ref.
United States	November 11, 2002	Hot adult contemporary; contemporary hit radio	Wind-up	
Australia	March 17, 2003	CD	Wind-up; Epic	
