= Higher (Creed song) =

1999 single by Creed

Single by Creed

from the album Human Clay
- Released: August 31, 1999
- Genre: Post-grunge; hard rock; alternative rock
- Length: 5:16 (album version); 4:44 (radio edit)
- Label: Wind-up
- Songwriters: Scott Stapp; Mark Tremonti
- Producer: John Kurzweg

Creed singles chronology
"One" (1998)	"Higher" (1999)	"What If" (2000)

Music video
- "Higher" on YouTube

"Higher" is a song by American rock band Creed. It was released on August 31, 1999, as the lead single from their second studio album, Human Clay. The song became the band's breakthrough hit, as it was their first song to reach the top 10 on the US Billboard Hot 100, peaking at number seven in July 2000. "Higher" also became the band's second chart-topping hit on rock radio, topping both the Modern Rock Tracks and Mainstream Rock Tracks charts. In 2024, the staff of Consequence included the song in their list of "50 Kick-Butt Post-Grunge Songs We Can Get Behind".

== Writing and recording ==
According to an interview with Loudwire, in an episode of "Wikipedia: Fact Or Fiction", Mark Tremonti revealed that the song was a culmination of the band improvising live onstage. During their earliest shows, the band only had a handful of songs in their setlist, and the audience would often get frustrated. To placate them, vocalist Scott Stapp would goad his bandmates to come up with a song live on the spot. Drummer Scott Phillips was the first to begin playing the drum set piece, with Mark later entering the chord progression associated with the song. After reviewing the tapes of the show, as they had always recorded their performances for later review, they decided that a proper song could be hammered together out of the different improvisations.

== Music and lyrics ==
Vocalist Scott Stapp and long-time friend Steven Harang wrote the song about the power of lucid dreaming. In another episode of Loudwire's "Wikipedia: Fact Or Fiction?" Stapp stated that the inspiration for the song came from a recurring dream that he had. In the endlessly present nightmare, Stapp would be hunted down and killed by an unknown assailant brandishing a firearm. Once he took up studying lucid dreaming, he was able to escape the gunman, and subsequently wrote the song as a memento towards the dream.

Musically the song has an anthemic and uplifting sound, often drawing comparisons to one of the band's later hit singles, "My Sacrifice". The song is written in the key of D major, with Tremonti playing in drop D tuning and Stapp singing in baritone. "Higher" has been described as post-grunge, hard rock and alternative rock.

== Music video ==
The video begins with the band sitting backstage before heading out to perform the song in front of an audience on stage. The video features slow motion and pause scenes of the band and the crowd, along with Stapp hanging in mid-air with his arms out while wearing his signature leather pants. At the end of the video, the camera pans back to the band backstage as they are seen once again walking to the stage to perform as they did at the beginning of the video, leaving the viewer to wonder if the original live performance was a dream or not. Director Ramaa Mosley, who also directed the video for "What's This Life For", recalls coming up with the idea after listening to the song with the record label. The first idea she had was of an epic performance that is later questioned to have ever happened. It was the only idea she pitched for the video.

The music video was shot in Orlando, Florida, at the Hard Rock Cafe. According to Mosley, filming the video was a "creative struggle", as Creed had only a short time to shoot the video before they went on tour in Japan. Over 300 extras were used in the video as members of the audience as well as the people seen with the band backstage. For the pause scenes, Mosley had the band and the audience freeze while the camera rotated around them, and also used multiple cameras set up around the band that were then joined with hovering objects added later in post-production. Cables were also used for scenes where Stapp is hovering over the audience. For the final scene, a 360 degree photography spin technique is used, a relatively new technique at the time, which required an array of cameras and sophisticated software to interpolate the still images into what appears to be one continuous shot of Stapp and the band backstage before heading off to play on stage.

Stapp himself has stated that he is embarrassed by the video and that it has not aged well. During a 2017 interview with GQ, Stapp said in regard to the video that "Sometimes I cringe when I see it. Like, 'What was I thinking? Look at those pants.'"

== Release and reception ==
Released as the lead single to the band's second album, Human Clay, "Higher" would prove to be Creed's major breakthrough hit when it peaked at number seven on the US Billboard Hot 100 on the issue dated July 22, 2000. It spent a total of 57 weeks upon the survey, which is the longest stay for any Creed song on the Hot 100, and finished at number 11 on the Hot 100 year-end chart for 2000. Furthermore, it topped both the Modern Rock Tracks and Mainstream Rock Tracks rankings in the process. "Higher" remained at the top spot on the Mainstream Rock Tracks chart for a then-record of 17 weeks, until it was surpassed by 3 Doors Down's song "Loser". The song would finish at number four on both the Mainstream and Modern Rock Tracks year-end charts for 2000. Internationally, the song topped the UK Rock and Metal (OCC) chart for four weeks in early 2000, and also peaked at number two on the Canada Rock/Alternative (RPM) chart. To promote the Human Clay album, the band also released a free digital download of "Higher" a full month before the records release. On May 10, 2019, nearly 20 years after its original release, the song was given Gold status by the Recording Industry Association of America (RIAA) for sales of over 500,000 certified digital units.

"Higher" placed at number 95 on VH1's "100 Greatest Hard Rock Songs" in 2009. It won the Song of the Year award at the 2000 My VH1 Music Awards, and was also nominated for the Best Rock Video award at the 2000 MTV Video Music Awards, but lost to Limp Bizkit's "Break Stuff".

A four-song EP was sold in December 1999 during the band's tour through Europe. It included a concert performance of "Roadhouse Blues", written by the Doors, recorded by Creed in July at Woodstock '99.

"Higher" EP
No.	Title	Length
1.	"Higher"	5:18
2.	"To Whom It May Concern"	5:10
3.	"Roadhouse Blues" (The Doors cover; live at Woodstock 1999)	5:52
4.	"What's This Life For" (Acoustic version)	4:22
Total length:		20:42

== Charts ==
=== Weekly charts ===
Weekly chart performance for "Higher"
Chart (1999–2000)	Peak position
Australia (ARIA)	36
Canada Rock/Alternative (RPM)	2
Germany (GfK)	91
Netherlands (Dutch Top 40 Tipparade)	5
Netherlands (Single Top 100)	62
Scottish Singles Sales (Official Charts)	77
UK Singles (Official Charts)	47
UK Rock & Metal (Official Charts)	1
US Billboard Hot 100	7
US Adult Pop Airplay (Billboard)	5
US Alternative Airplay (Billboard)	1
US Mainstream Rock (Billboard)	1
US Pop Airplay (Billboard)	4

=== Year-end charts ===
1999 year-end chart performance for "Higher"
Chart (1999)	Position
Canada Rock/Alternative (RPM)	14
US Mainstream Rock Tracks (Billboard)	13
US Modern Rock Tracks (Billboard)	30

2000 year-end chart performance for "Higher"
Chart (2000)	Position
US Billboard Hot 100	11
US Adult Top 40 (Billboard)	11
US Mainstream Rock Tracks (Billboard)	4
US Mainstream Top 40 (Billboard)	4
US Modern Rock Tracks (Billboard)	33

== Certifications ==
Certifications and sales for "Higher"
Region	Certification	Certified units/sales
New Zealand (RMNZ)	2× Platinum	60,000^{‡}
United Kingdom (BPI)	Silver	200,000^{‡}
United States (RIAA)	2× Platinum	2,000,000^{‡}
^{‡} Sales+streaming figures based on certification alone.

== Release history ==
Release dates and formats for "Higher"
Region	Date	Format(s)	Label(s)	Ref.
United States	August 31, 1999	Mainstream rock; active rock; alternative radio	Wind-up	
United Kingdom	January 3, 2000	CD	Wind-up; Epic	
Australia (re-release)	September 10, 2001	CD	Wind-up; Epic	
United Kingdom (re-release)	September 17, 2001	7-inch vinyl; CD; cassette	Wind-up; Epic	

== Appearance in media ==
- "Higher" appeared in the films The Skulls and 22 Jump Street.
- The song had appeared in some of the official trailers for Titan A.E., but did not appear in the film itself or its soundtrack.
- The song was performed live by Creed on the November 16, 1999, episode of Late Night with David Letterman, the 2000 Billboard Music Awards, the 2001 Blockbuster Entertainment Awards and the April 23, 2010, episode of The Tonight Show with Jay Leno.
- "Higher" was performed as part of a medley, which also included "Don't Stop Dancing" and "My Sacrifice", during the band's performance at the halftime show at the 2001 Dallas Cowboys' annual Thanksgiving Day football game on November 22, 2001.
- In Game 3 of the 2023 American League Division Series between the Texas Rangers and Baltimore Orioles, Rangers fans sang along to "Higher" as it was played at Globe Life Field. According to Rangers pitcher Andrew Heaney, the team began listening to Creed's music during the second half of the regular season as motivation. In Game 3 of the 2023 American League Championship Series between the Texas Rangers and Houston Astros, the band made a surprise appearance at Globe Life Field to sing along with Rangers fans to their song; the band earlier tweeted their support for the team. Following their win in Game 7 against the Astros at Minute Maid Park, the Rangers celebrated by singing along to "Higher" in the visitor's locker room. After winning the 2023 World Series, the Rangers celebrated by singing the song in the locker room. That same night at the American Airlines Center, following a game where the Dallas Mavericks defeated the Chicago Bulls, the World Series game was put on the jumbotron and "Higher" was blasted inside the arena following the Rangers' victory. Two days later, the Rangers held their victory parade in Arlington and played the Creed song as they took the stage with the Commissioner's Trophy in front of over half a million Rangers fans.
- Inspired by the Texas Rangers, the Minnesota Vikings played "Higher" before their Week 6 victory over division rival the Chicago Bears; Vikings quarterback Kirk Cousins credited the song in an interview. The following week, they repeated this before and after their victory over the San Francisco 49ers on Monday Night Football. Despite the successful use of the song, the Vikings were eliminated from postseason contention.
- "Higher" was used in an advertisement of Paramount+, made for Super Bowl LVIII, which was released on February 1, 2024. The ad features Patrick Stewart, Drew Barrymore, Tua Tagovailoa, Knuckles the Echidna, Arnold from Hey Arnold!, Peppa Pig, and numerous other properties belonging to Paramount or related to Paramount+ shows. The premise of the ad features the group of characters attempting to get over a tall cliff. After conspiring, Creed (consisting of Scott Stapp and Mark Tremonti) suddenly appears and starts playing "Higher". This gives the characters the energy to tempt fate, and Stewart is seen picking up Arnold, and throwing him like a football (a gag on Arnold's head shape). Throughout the ad, Arnold flies through the air, and the vocals of "Higher" switch between Stapp's studio vocals and parody vocals sung by the characters, including Arnold. Arnold crashes into the cliff, and the characters then look at Peppa as the next candidate. It also shows Lieutenant Jim Dangle (Thomas Lennon) from Reno 911! showing off a Creed tattoo on his lower back.

== See also ==
- List of Billboard Mainstream Rock number-one songs of the 1990s
- List of Billboard number-one alternative singles of the 1990s
