= With Arms Wide Open =

2000 single by Creed

Single by Creed

from the album Human Clay
- B-side: "Wash Away Those Years"; "One"
- Written: Early 1998
- Released: April 18, 2000
- Genre: Post-grunge
- Length: 4:36 (album version); 3:53 (radio version)
- Label: Wind-up; Epic
- Songwriters: Scott Stapp; Mark Tremonti
- Producers: Ron Saint Germain; John Kurzweg

Creed singles chronology
"What If" (2000)	"With Arms Wide Open" (2000)	"Are You Ready?" (2000)

Music video
- "With Arms Wide Open" on YouTube

"With Arms Wide Open" is a song by American rock band Creed. The power ballad was released on April 18, 2000, as the third single from their second studio album, Human Clay (1999). The song reached number one on the US Billboard Hot 100 in November 2000, becoming the band's first and only song to top the chart. The song also received honors at the 43rd Annual Grammy Awards in 2001, being nominated for Best Rock Vocal Performance by a Duo or Group, as well as Scott Stapp and Mark Tremonti winning the Grammy Award for Best Rock Song.

== Writing and recording ==
Scott Stapp began writing the lyrics to "With Arms Wide Open" in early 1998 while touring to support Creed's debut album My Own Prison when he found out that his then-wife Hillaree Burns was pregnant with his first child, Jagger. According to Stapp the song was written in just 15 minutes during a soundcheck. Stapp overheard guitarist Mark Tremonti playing an improvised melody and loved what he heard so much that he ran in and told Tremonti to just keep playing as Stapp began singing his lyrics.

== Music and lyrics ==
Stapp wrote the lyrics when he found out, with great surprise, that he was going to be a father. The original lyrics to the song were written from the perspective of having a daughter, even though his wife was pregnant with a boy, as Stapp used "she" during early live performances. This would eventually be changed when Stapp found out he would be having a son. In later years Stapp would not use "he" or "she" in reference to the child but rather "they" to refer to both his sons and daughter. In a 2013 interview with Songfacts, Stapp said of the song:

"It continues to have relevant meaning in my life because as I sing it now, I think of my daughter who's now on this planet and alive. And then I think of my newest son, my three-year-old, Daniel. And then I think back to the spirit and the somewhat naiveté, just that brutal honesty that that song expressed as me being a young man and approaching fatherhood for the first time. Now I'm a full-fledged father with a 14-year-old, a daughter who's going to be 7 in June and my youngest, who's 3. So those are still my feelings. And as a human being and as a father, my feelings haven't changed one bit from those that are expressed in that song. Every time I sing it, I can connect with it again and again and again because I'm no longer expressing fears in my thoughts about being a father; I'm a full-fledged living-it-every-day father. So it just rings true to me." — Stapp

Musically the song is a power ballad written in the key of C major, with Tremonti playing in drop D tuning and Stapp singing in his signature baritone singing voice. According to Stapp, following the massive crossover success of the single which he felt led to the song being heavily overplayed, so much so that even his then-wife Hillaree Burns would turn away from it, and upon hearing impersonations of other people mimicking his vocal delivery in a dramatic, over-the-top fashion he purposely began to alter his vocal style which he feels has helped him grow as a vocalist. He states "I don't know where I picked up all the idiosyncrasies of how I enunciate and I've been called out on my vowels ... But it's actually helped me as a singer because I've heard that and I've intentionally enunciated differently on different words and syllables, so thank you world for pointing out a consistent pattern early in my 20s so I could evolve and grow as a singer. You made me better. Thank you."

Three main versions of the song exist. One is the original album version. The second is the radio version, which adds additional hi-hat and drums, and also edits out the ending. The third is the video version (or "Strings Remix") which adds strings to the radio version.

== Release and reception ==
"With Arms Wide Open" reached number one on the US Billboard Hot Mainstream Rock Tracks chart for four weeks in July 2000 and is Creed's only track to appear on the Billboard Adult Contemporary chart, where it peaked at number 29 in March 2001. In October, the song entered the top 10 of Billboard's Adult Top 40 chart and later topped the listing for eight weeks. It also reached number one on the Billboard Hot 100 on the issue dated November 11, 2000, for one week, becoming their first and only number one on the chart. The music video topped VH1's Top 10 Countdown in 2000. On May 10, 2019, nearly 20 years after the release of Human Clay, the single was certified gold by the Recording Industry Association of America (RIAA) for sales of over 500,000 digital units. On November 30, 2020, the certification was upgraded to double platinum for sales and streams of over two million units.

The title became the name of a foundation set up by Stapp to help children and families. To launch the With Arms Wide Open Foundation, the band released a limited edition "enhanced-package single" in September 2000, with proceeds going to the charity to "promote healthy, loving relationships between children and their families". The single contained an orchestrated version, a rock version, an acoustic reading, and the music video. In February 2001, Scott Stapp and Mark Tremonti were nominated for and won the Grammy Award for Best Rock Song as the writers of "With Arms Wide Open" at the 43rd Annual Grammy Awards. The song was also nominated for Best Rock Vocal Performance by a Duo or Group with Vocal but lost to U2 for "Beautiful Day". The music video for "With Arms Wide Open" was voted the 92nd best music video of all time by VH1, who also ranked it number four on its "25 Greatest Power Ballads" list.

Foo Fighters frontman Dave Grohl described "With Arms Wide Open" as "one of the most amazing songs of all time".

== Appearances in media ==
Creed performed the song live on the June 16, 2000, episode of The Tonight Show with Jay Leno, and on November 30, 2000, at the first annual My VH1 Music Awards. The song was made available as downloadable content for the video games Rocksmith 2014 on September 16, 2014, and Rock Band 4 on May 21, 2020. A cinematic cover version of the song, performed by Nicole Serrano and Tommee Profitt, was used in a February 2022 ad campaign to promote the 94th Academy Awards.

== Track listings ==
US limited-edition minimax CD single

1. "With Arms Wide Open" (strings version)
2. "With Arms Wide Open" (acoustic version)
3. "With Arms Wide Open" (rock version)
4. "With Arms Wide Open" (video)

UK CD single

1. "With Arms Wide Open" (new version) – 3:42
2. "With Arms Wide Open" (strings version) – 3:55
3. "With Arms Wide Open" (acoustic version) – 3:55
4. "With Arms Wide Open" (album version) – 4:26
5. "With Arms Wide Open" (video—strings version)

UK limited-edition 7-inch single

A. "With Arms Wide Open" (new version) – 3:42
B. "With Arms Wide Open" (acoustic version) – 3:55

European CD single

1. "With Arms Wide Open" (new version) – 3:42
2. "With Arms Wide Open" (strings version) – 3:55

Australian and New Zealand CD single

1. "With Arms Wide Open" (new version) – 3:42
2. "Wash Away Those Years" – 6:04
3. "One" – 5:02
4. "With Arms Wide Open" (strings version) – 3:55
5. "With Arms Wide Open" (video)

== Charts ==
=== Weekly charts ===
Weekly chart performance for "With Arms Wide Open"
Chart (2000–2001)	Peak position
Australia (ARIA)	4
Austria (Ö3 Austria Top 40)	15
Canada Top Singles (RPM)	2 (Note: "With Arms Wide Open" reached number 2 when RPM ceased publication in November 2000.)
Canada Adult Contemporary (RPM)	33 (Note: "With Arms Wide Open" reached number 33 when RPM ceased publication in November 2000.)
Canada Rock/Alternative (RPM)	1
Europe (Eurochart Hot 100)	47
Germany (GfK)	42
Iceland (Íslenski Listinn Topp 40)	2
Ireland (IRMA)	40
Latvia (Latvijas Top 40)	8
Netherlands (Dutch Top 40 Tipparade)	12
Netherlands (Single Top 100)	75
New Zealand (Recorded Music NZ)	10
Norway (VG-lista)	6
Portugal (AFP)	10
Scottish Singles Sales (Official Charts)	17
Switzerland (Schweizer Hitparade)	70
UK Singles (Official Charts)	13
UK Rock & Metal (Official Charts)	1
US Billboard Hot 100	1
US Adult Alternative Airplay (Billboard)	6
US Adult Contemporary (Billboard)	29
US Adult Pop Airplay (Billboard)	1
US Alternative Airplay (Billboard)	2
US Mainstream Rock (Billboard)	1
US Pop Airplay (Billboard)	1

=== Year-end charts ===
2000 year-end chart performance for "With Arms Wide Open"
Chart (2000)	Position
New Zealand (RIANZ)	37
US Billboard Hot 100	36
US Mainstream Rock Tracks (Billboard)	5
US Mainstream Top 40 (Billboard)	36
US Modern Rock Tracks (Billboard)	10

2001 year-end chart performance for "With Arms Wide Open"
Chart (2001)	Position
Australia (ARIA)	20
Canada Radio (Nielsen BDS)	48
US Billboard Hot 100	39
US Adult Top 40 (Billboard)	10
US Mainstream Top 40 (Billboard)	34

=== Decade-end charts ===
Decade-end chart performance for "With Arms Wide Open"
Chart (2000–2009)	Position
US Billboard Hot 100	46
US Mainstream Top 40 (Billboard)	44

== Certifications ==
Certifications and sales for "With Arms Wide Open"
Region	Certification	Certified units/sales
Australia (ARIA)	2× Platinum	140,000^{^}
Brazil (Pro-Música Brasil)	Gold	30,000^{‡}
New Zealand (RMNZ)	2× Platinum	60,000^{‡}
United States (RIAA)	2× Platinum	2,000,000^{‡}
^{^} Shipments figures based on certification alone.^{‡} Sales+streaming figures based on certification alone.

== Release history ==
Release dates and formats for "With Arms Wide Open"
Region	Date	Format(s)	Label(s)	Ref.
United States	April 18, 2000	Mainstream rock; active rock radio	Wind-up	
United States	April 24, 2000	Minimax CD	Wind-up	
United States	August 28, 2000	Hot adult contemporary radio	Wind-up	
United Kingdom	January 8, 2001	7-inch vinyl; CD	Wind-up; Epic	
Australia	April 9, 2001	CD	Wind-up	
