= Human Clay =

Studio album by Creed
- Released: September 28, 1999
- Recorded: Late 1998 – early 1999
- Genres: Post-grunge; hard rock; alternative metal
- Length: 56:28
- Label: Wind-up
- Producer: John Kurzweg

Creed chronology
My Own Prison (1997)	Human Clay (1999)	Weathered (2001)

Singles from Human Clay
- 1. "Higher" Released: August 31, 1999; 2. "What If" Released: January 31, 2000; 3. "With Arms Wide Open" Released: April 18, 2000; 4. "Are You Ready?" Released: August 7, 2000

Human Clay is the second studio album by American rock band Creed, released on September 28, 1999, through Wind-up Records. Produced by John Kurzweg, it was the band's last album to feature Brian Marshall, who left the band in August 2000, as well as the last album featuring the original line-up, until 2009's Full Circle.

The album earned mixed to positive reviews from critics and was a massive commercial success, peaking at number one on the US Billboard 200 and staying there for two weeks. The album spawned two singles that peaked in the top 10 of the Billboard Hot 100: "Higher", which peaked at number 7, and "With Arms Wide Open", their only number one single. The album sold over 11.5 million copies in the US alone and over 20 million worldwide, making it the best selling album of Creed's career and one of the best-selling albums in the United States.

The title of the album comes from a lyric in "Say I" ("The dust has finally settled on the field of human clay"), a song which carries the same message.

== Background ==
Human Clay is the only Creed album to not have a title track, but the name is featured in the beginning of the 4th song in the album, "Say I". The album had four music videos created for it: "Higher" and "What If" in 1999, "With Arms Wide Open" in 2000, and “Are You Ready?” in 2024.

== Music and lyrics ==
The music on Human Clay has been characterized as "hard rock rooted firmly in the Seattle vein, complete with really big riffs and intensely introspective lyrics." Influences present on the album include Pearl Jam, Alice in Chains and Stone Temple Pilots. "They're not trying to stretch into political causes or worldbeat like Pearl Jam; they're not reveling in dark psychedelia like Soundgarden; nor are they attempting a glam-Abbey Road like Stone Temple Pilots. Creed is a straightforward grunge and hard rock band, embracing everything that goes along with that." Laura Morgan of Entertainment Weekly described the sound as "lunkheaded kegger rock sculpted from [...] grunge riffs and aggressive discharge." She described the lyrics as "quasi-spiritual." The material is considered to be more polished than on My Own Prison.

== Title and artwork ==
The cover artwork was designed by Mark Tremonti's brother Daniel, who had previously done the artwork and photography for Creed's debut album, My Own Prison (1997). According to Mark Tremonti, the album cover represents a crossroad which every man finds himself at in his life and the man of clay represented "our actions, that what we are is up to us, that we lead our own path and make our own destiny."

== Release and commercial performance ==
The album was the band's first to hit number one in the US, where it debuted with first week sales of 315,000, and stayed on top for two weeks. Human Clay was certified diamond by the Recording Industry Association of America (RIAA) on July 16, 2001, for selling 10,000,000 copies, was later certified 11× platinum on January 29, 2004, and is the 54th best-selling album of all time in the United States (as of February 2007). It ranks as the tenth best selling album in the U.S. since the advent of Nielsen SoundScan in 1991, and the ninth best-selling album in the U.S. in the 2000s. It has also been certified 6 times platinum in Canada, 5 times in Australia, 7 times in New Zealand, and 4 times in Switzerland among others, selling an estimated 20 million copies worldwide. The album has spent a record 104 weeks on the Billboard chart survey. As of October 2014, it has sold 11,690,000 copies in the United States alone, according to Nielsen SoundScan.

== Critical reception ==
Professional ratings
Review scores
Source	Rating
AllMusic	4/5 stars
Christgau's Consumer Guide	C
Cryptic Rock	5/5
The Encyclopedia of Popular Music	4/5 stars
Entertainment Weekly	C−
Los Angeles Times	2/4 stars
Rolling Stone	2.5/5 stars
Rock Hard	9/10
The Phantom Tollbooth	Review 1: Review 2:

The album received mixed to positive reviews from critics. AllMusic's Stephen Thomas Erlewine gave the album 4 stars out of 5, concluding that "it may not be the kind of thing that knocks out critics or grunge purists, but it does deliver for anyone looking for direct, grunge-flavored hard rock. [...] Human Clay does make it clear that there is an audience for post-grunge hard rock, as long as it's delivered without pretension and as long as it meets the audience's desire for straight-ahead, hard-hitting music."

Laura Morgan of Entertainment Weekly called the album's riffs "tiresome" in a lukewarm review. She added: "Quasi-spiritual lyrics that have all the resonance of a self-help manual hardly help their cause. But so what? Chances are the opiate-hungry throngs will fist-pound in unison to such insights as 'Forked tongues in bitter mouths/ Can drive a man to bleed from inside out.'"

== Legacy ==
The album's third single, "With Arms Wide Open", won a Grammy Award for Best Rock Song in 2001. At the 28th Annual American Music Awards, Human Clay won the American Music Award for Favorite Pop/Rock Album. At the 2002 Billboard Music Awards, the album won the award for Catalog Album of the Year. Human Clay was ranked number 422 in Rock Hard magazine's book The 500 Greatest Rock & Metal Albums of All Time in 2005. Human Clay was ranked number 5 on Billboard's 200 Albums of the Decade in 2009. VH1 listed "Higher" as one of the greatest hard rock songs of all time in 2009. The music video for "With Arms Wide Open" was voted the 92nd best music video of all time by VH1, who also ranked it number 4 on its "25 Greatest Power Ballads" list.

In 2014, Tom Hawking of Flavorwire included the album in his list of "The 50 Worst Albums Ever Made", commenting: "I mean, obviously." By contrast, in 2025 Lauryn Schaffner of Loudwire named the album the best post-grunge release of 1999. That same year, she said it was the band's best album.

== Track listing ==
=== Original release ===
All lyrics are written by Scott Stapp; all music is composed by Mark Tremonti.

No.	Title	Length
1.	"Are You Ready?"	4:45
2.	"What If"	5:18
3.	"Beautiful"	4:20
4.	"Say I"	5:15
5.	"Wrong Way"	4:19
6.	"Faceless Man"	5:59
7.	"Never Die"	4:51
8.	"With Arms Wide Open"	4:38
9.	"Higher"	5:16
10.	"Wash Away Those Years"	6:04
11.	"Inside Us All"	5:39
Total length:		56:28

US edition bonus track
No.	Title	Length
12.	"With Arms Wide Open" (strings version; hidden track)	3:55
Total length:		60:23

European edition bonus track and deluxe edition bonus tracks (disc one)
No.	Title	Length
12.	"Young Grow Old"	4:47
Total length:		61:11

Deluxe edition bonus disc
No.	Title	Writer(s)	Length
1.	"To Whom It May Concern"		5:11
2.	"Roadhouse Blues" (featuring Robbie Krieger; live at Woodstock '99)	Jim Morrison	5:51
3.	"What's This Life For" (acoustic)		4:23
4.	"With Arms Wide Open" (acoustic)		3:56
5.	"Is This the End?" (Scream edit)		6:15
Total length:			86:48

25th anniversary deluxe edition bonus tracks
No.	Title	Length
12.	"With Arms Wide Open" (strings version)	3:56
13.	"Young Grow Old"	4:47
14.	"To Whom It May Concern"	5:12
15.	"Is This the End?" (Scream edit)	6:18

25th anniversary deluxe edition bonus disc – Live at Freeman Coliseum, San Antonio, Texas, 1999
No.	Title	Length
1.	"Are You Ready?"	4:30
2.	"Ode"	5:10
3.	"Torn"	6:26
4.	"Beautiful"	4:34
5.	"Illusion"	5:53
6.	"Say I"	6:02
7.	"My Own Prison"	5:36
8.	"What If"	5:08
9.	"With Arms Wide Open"	5:23
10.	"Faceless Man"	6:41
11.	"What's This Life For"	6:53
12.	"One"	5:27
13.	"Higher"	6:04
Total length:		73:54

25th anniversary deluxe edition bonus digital tracks
No.	Title	Writer(s)	Length
12.	"With Arms Wide Open" (strings version)		3:56
13.	"Young Grow Old"		4:47
14.	"To Whom It May Concern"		5:12
15.	"Is This the End?" (Scream edit)		6:18
16.	"Roadhouse Blues" (featuring Robbie Krieger; live at Woodstock '99)	Morrison	5:51
17.	"I'm Eighteen"	Alice Cooper; Michael Bruce; Glen Buxton; Dennis Dunaway; Neal Smith	3:12
18.	"Higher" (radio edit)		4:44
19.	"With Arms Wide Open" (single version)		3:42
20.	"What If" (radio edit)		4:52
21.	"With Arms Wide Open" (acoustic)		3:56
22.	"Are You Ready?" (live at Freemen Coliseum 1999)		4:30
23.	"Ode" (live at Freemen Coliseum 1999)		5:10
24.	"Torn" (live at Freemen Coliseum 1999)		6:26
25.	"Beautiful" (live at Freemen Coliseum 1999)		4:34
26.	"Illusion" (live at Freemen Coliseum 1999)		5:53
27.	"Say I" (live at Freemen Coliseum 1999)		6:02
28.	"My Own Prison" (live at Freemen Coliseum 1999)		5:36
29.	"What If" (live at Freemen Coliseum 1999)		5:08
30.	"With Arms Wide Open" (live at Freemen Coliseum 1999)		5:23
31.	"Faceless Man" (live at Freemen Coliseum 1999)		6:41
32.	"What's This Life For" (live at Freemen Coliseum 1999)		6:53
33.	"One" (live at Freemen Coliseum 1999)		5:27
34.	"Higher" (live at Freemen Coliseum 1999)		6:04

== Personnel ==
Credits adapted from album liner notes.

Creed

- Scott Stapp – lead vocals
- Mark Tremonti – guitar, backing vocals
- Brian Marshall – bass
- Scott Phillips – drums

Additional musicians

- John Kurzweg – B-3 organ on "Wrong Way"
- Kirk Kelsey – Mandolin on "Wrong Way"

Technical personnel

- Jeff Hanson – executive producer, management at Jeff Hanson Management & Promotions
- John Kurzweg – production, engineering, mixing
- Kirk Kelsey – mixing assistant, mixing on "Wrong Way"
- Barrett Miller, Mark Kiczula, Steve Bearsley – assistant mix engineering
- Dana Cornock – digital editing
- Ted Jensen – mastering at Sterling Sound, New York City
- Joel Mark – A&R
- Daniel Tremonti (Three Mountain Design) – art direction, design, cover, additional photography
- Sacha Waldman – cover photography, additional photography
- J. Seward Johnson Jr. – "Crack the Whip" artwork

2024 Deluxe Edition remaster

- Chris Clough – audio supervision
- Ryan Jebavy – editorial
- Sage LaMonica – design
- Kay Anderson, Sig Sigworth, Josiah Toews, Scott Webber – project assistance
- Ted Jensen – remastering

== Charts ==
=== Weekly charts ===
Chart performance for Human Clay
Chart (1999–2002)	Peak position
Australian Albums (ARIA)	2
Austrian Albums (Ö3 Austria)	11
Canadian Albums (Billboard)	1
Danish Albums (Hitlisten)	1
Dutch Albums (Album Top 100)	80
Finnish Albums (Suomen virallinen lista)	9
German Albums (Offizielle Top 100)	9
Irish Albums (IRMA)	54
New Zealand Albums (RMNZ)	4
Norwegian Albums (VG-lista)	1
Scottish Albums (Official Charts)	23
South African Albums (RISA)	3
Swedish Albums (Sverigetopplistan)	9
Swiss Albums (Schweizer Hitparade)	35
UK Albums (Official Charts)	29
UK Rock & Metal Albums (Official Charts)	5
US Billboard 200	1

=== Year-end charts ===
1999 year-end chart performance for Human Clay
Chart (1999)	Position
New Zealand Albums (RMNZ)	42
US Billboard 200	71

2000 year-end chart performance for Human Clay
Chart (2000)	Position
Canadian Albums (Nielsen SoundScan)	10
New Zealand Albums (RMNZ)	10
US Billboard 200	6

2001 year-end chart performance for Human Clay
Chart (2001)	Position
Australian Albums (ARIA)	3
Austrian Albums (Ö3 Austria)	38
Canadian Albums (Nielsen SoundScan)	72
Danish Albums (Hitlisten)	22
German Albums (Offizielle Top 100)	68
US Billboard 200	11

2002 year-end chart performance for Human Clay
Chart (2002)	Position
Canadian Alternative Albums (Nielsen SoundScan)	86
Canadian Metal Albums (Nielsen SoundScan)	39
US Top Pop Catalog Albums (Billboard)	1

=== Decade-end charts ===
Decade-end chart performance for Human Clay
Chart (2000–2009)	Position
Australian Albums (ARIA)	88
US Billboard 200	5

== Certifications ==
Certifications and sales for Human Clay
Region	Certification	Certified units/sales
Australia (ARIA)	4× Platinum	280,000^{^}
Austria (IFPI Austria)	Gold	25,000^{*}
Canada (Music Canada)	6× Platinum	600,000^{^}
Denmark (IFPI Danmark)	Gold	25,000^{^}
Germany (BVMI)	Gold	150,000^{^}
New Zealand (RMNZ)	5× Platinum	75,000^{^}
Norway (IFPI Norway)	Platinum	50,000^{*}
South Africa (RISA)	3× Platinum	150,000^{*}
Sweden (GLF)	Gold	40,000^{^}
United Kingdom (BPI)	Gold	100,000^{^}
United States (RIAA)	11× Platinum	11,690,000
^{*} Sales figures based on certification alone.^{^} Shipments figures based on certification alone.

== See also ==
- List of best-selling albums in the United States
