= John Kurzweg =

American record producer and musician (born 1960)

John Kurzweg (born September 5, 1960) is an American record producer and musician who first became known for his work with successful post-grunge bands Creed and Puddle of Mudd in the late 1990s and early 2000s. Other artists he has worked with include Godsmack, Eagle Eye Cherry, Jewel, Big Head Todd & the Monsters, Socialburn, No Address, Hurt, DoubleDrive, Chelsea Bain as well as the Athens southern rock band Tishamingo.

The total number of albums sold that Kurzweg has produced is currently over 40 million copies worldwide (over 58 million according to Creed's discography & Puddle of Mudd's Come Clean) and along with these, Kurzweg produced and or mixed 12 number one hit singles at rock radio, eight top 10 rock radio hits and at least four others in the top 50.

Creed's debut My Own Prison (which was recorded in Kurzweg's house), and the third album, Weathered were certified multi-platinum and initially sold more than six million copies each - the second, Human Clay was quickly certified diamond (more than 10 million sold). All three Creed albums were recorded in houses instead of studios, and Kurzweg also played keyboards on My Own Prison and Human Clay.

Kurzweg produced Puddle of Mudd's debut album Come Clean which sold more than five million copies and included the band's two most well-known songs, "Blurry" and "She Hates Me", both of which achieved the #1 spot on Billboard's Mainstream Rock Tracks. Kurzweg also worked on the majority of their follow-up release Life on Display in 2003 as well as two songs from Volume 4: Songs in the Key of Love & Hate. In 2009 Kurzweg produced and mixed Godsmack’s Whiskey Hangover which hit No. 1 on the Billboard Hot Mainstream Rock Tracks, and appeared on the deluxe edition of The Oracle.

Prior to his success as record producer Kurzweg was a popular musician in the Tallahassee and Jacksonville, Florida, areas, fronting on lead vocals and guitar for bands such as Slapstick, Radio Bikini, Synergy, and John Kurzweg & the Night as well as one-off gigs on drums for Percy Sledge and Chuck Berry and guitar and keyboards for Mike Angelo & the Idols.

In the late 1980s, Kurzweg signed as a solo artist with Atlantic Records, and released a record in February 1987 under the name John Philip (his middle name). The album, Wait for the Night (which Ken Scott produced/recorded the first half of) received mostly positive reviews and some airplay for a few weeks. After this experience Kurzweg started producing other artists, at first mostly in the Florida-Georgia area.

In 2003, he moved to New Mexico and, from 2006 until 2015, Kurzweg was the lead guitarist for Santa Fe artist, Sean Healen, and produced/mixed and co-wrote for the Sean Healen Band's 2008 award-winning album Flood Plain.

Currently residing in Santa Fe, New Mexico, along with producing and mixing, Kurzweg is back to writing and recording his own songs and playing shows with his own band.
