= Wind-up Records =

US record label

- Parent company: Concord (until 2026); BMG Rights Management (since 2026)
- Founded: 1997
- Founder: Alan Meltzer; Diana Meltzer
- Defunct: 2016
- Distributors: BMG (1997–2004); Sony BMG (2004–2008); Warner Music (2004–2011; Canada only); Sony Music (2008–2009); EMI (2009–2012); Universal Music Group (2012–2016); Craft Recordings (reissues)
- Genre: Rock; metal; various
- Country of origin: U.S.
- Location: New York City
- Official website: winduprecords.com

Wind-up Records, LLC (legally known as Wind-up Entertainment Inc. until 2004) was an American record label founded by Alan and Diana Meltzer in 1997. It was based in New York City and was distributed by BMG Distribution. Wind-up's best-selling artists worldwide were Creed and Evanescence.

== History ==
Wind-up Records was formed in 1997 by Alan Meltzer, former owner of CD One Stop, and his wife Diana Meltzer, following their 1996 purchase of Grass Records. The parent company Wind-up Entertainment also runs numerous publishing companies as well as a full-scale retail, online and tour merchandising company. The company's slogan was "Developing Career Artists".

Some of the successful acts on the label included Evanescence, Creed, Seether and Finger Eleven. The label has also re-released albums from bands previously associated with Grass Records, such as Toadies, the Wrens and Commander Venus.

The label's current roster includes Civil Twilight, Jillette Johnson, The Griswolds, The Virginmarys, Young Guns, Strange Talk, The Revivalists, Five for Fighting, Crobot, Filter, SPEAK, Genevieve and Aranda.

In September 2009, the label reached an agreement with EMI Music Germany and in February 2011 with EMI Music Canada. The partnership has seen EMI Music take over the marketing and distribution of artists such as Creed, Evanescence, Seether and Finger Eleven throughout the world outside of the US.

In Canada, distribution was initially with Sony Music Canada as was the distribution in the United States. However, in October 2004, distribution in Canada switched over to Warner Music Canada with the creation of Wind-up Entertainment Canada. Distribution in Canada moved again, for a third time in February 2011, this time to EMI Music Canada.

On October 31, 2011, the label's founder, Alan Meltzer, died at the age of 67.

In 2012, Universal Music Group acquired the EMI music operations, making the distribution in Canada solely distributed by Universal Music Group.

In October 2013, the Bicycle Music Company bought the rights to much of Wind-Up's back catalog, including the contracts to acts such as Seether. These artists will be distributed by Concord Music Group, which later merged with Bicycle. In May 2015, Concord bought the rest of the Wind-Up label.

In 2016, Concord retired Wind-Up as a frontline label, and transferred most of Wind-Up's artists to other labels. Wind-Up's reissues are released under Craft Recordings, Concord's reissue label. In 2026, Concord merged with BMG Rights Management, the successor to Wind-Up's first distributor.

== Notable artists ==
=== Final ===
Accurate according to Wind-up's website as of October 9, 2016.

- Allday
- Aranda
- Civil Twilight
- Citizen Zero
- Crobot
- Feenixpawl
- Filter
- Five for Fighting
- Genevieve
- Jillette Johnson
- The Revivalists – transferred to Razor & Tie
- Speak
- Ryan Star
- Strange Talk
- The Griswolds
- Young Guns
- The Virginmarys

=== Previous ===
- 12 Stones
- Alter Bridge
- American Pearl
- Atomship
- Baboon
- Bayside
- Ben Moody
- Big Dismal
- Bob Guiney
- Boy Hits Car
- BoySetsFire
- Brainiac
- Breaking Point
- Cartel
- CFO$
- Company of Thieves
- The Crash Motive
- Creed
- The Darkness
- The Drowners
- Drowning Pool
- Dust for Life
- Edgewater
- Emily Osment
- Evanescence
- The Exit
- Finger Eleven
- Hawthorne Heights
- James Durbin
- Jeremy Fisher
- New Radiant Storm King
- O.A.R.
- People in Planes
- Pilot Speed
- Pollen
- Push Play
- Scott Stapp
- Seether
- Seven Wiser
- Stars of Track and Field
- Stefy
- Stereo Fuse
- Strata
- Stretch Princess
- Submersed
- Tickle Me Pink
- Thriving Ivory
- Trickside
- The Wrens

== Soundtracks ==
- 1080° Avalanche (video game)
- Daredevil: The Album
- Elektra: The Album
- Fantastic 4: The Album
- John Tucker Must Die
- The Punisher: The Album
- Scream 3: The Album
- Walk the Line: Original Motion Picture Soundtrack

== See also ==
- List of record labels
