= Finger Eleven discography =

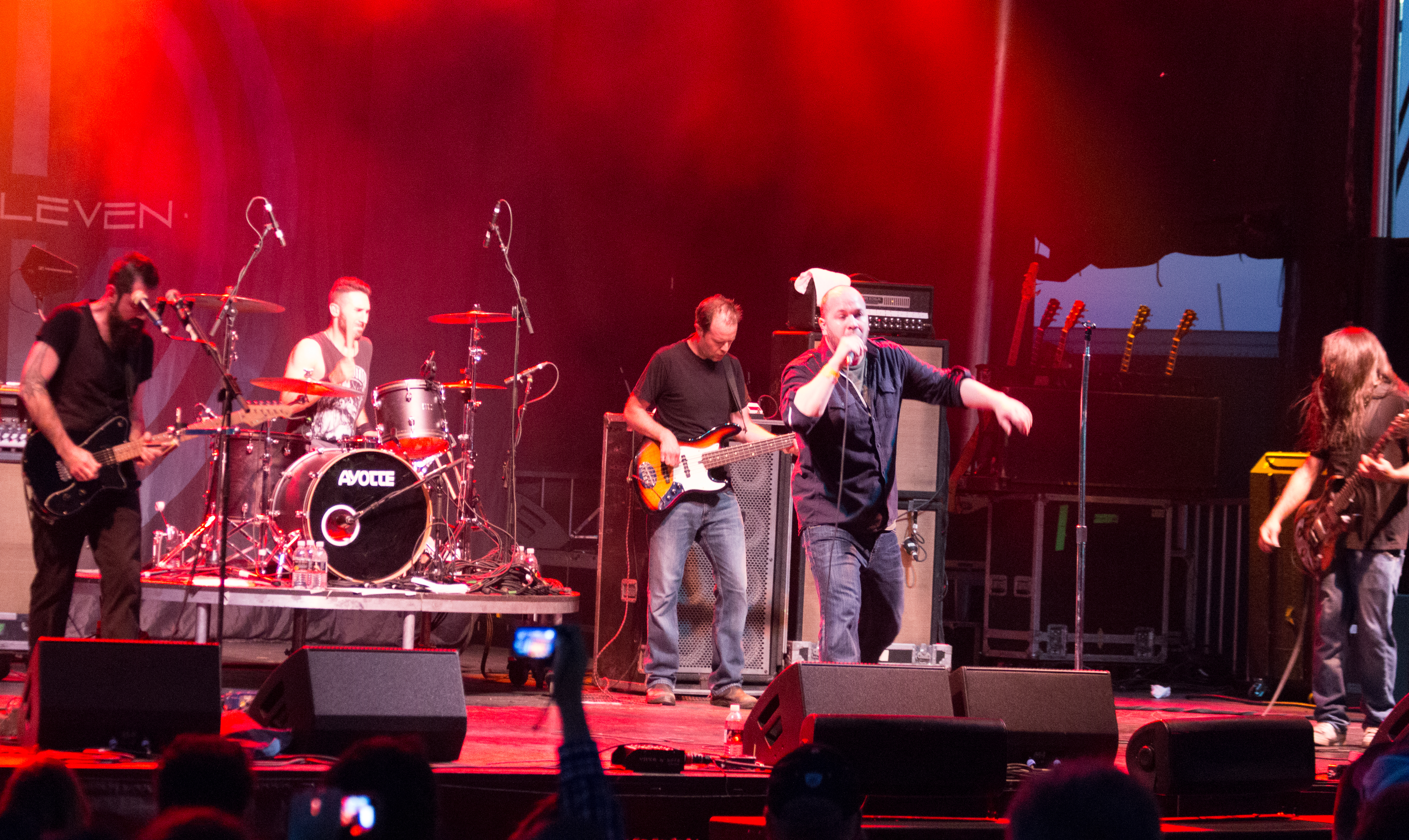
- Finger Eleven performing in 2017
- Studio albums: 8
- Extended plays: 2
- Soundtrack albums: 2
- Live albums: 1
- Compilation albums: 2
- Singles: 22
- Video albums: 1
- Music videos: 18

The following is a list of releases by the Canadian rock band Finger Eleven.

== Albums ==
=== Studio albums ===
Year	Album details	Peak chart peaks				Certifications (sales thresholds)
Year	Album details	CAN	AUS	NZ	US	Certifications (sales thresholds)
1995	Letters from Chutney^{[A]}: Released: April 19, 1995; Label: Mercury	45	—	—	—	
1997	Tip: Released: August 26, 1997; Label: Mercury	—	—	—	—	MC: Gold
2000	The Greyest of Blue Skies: Released: July 25, 2000; Label: Wind-up	17	—	—	—	MC: Gold
2003	Finger Eleven: Released: June 17, 2003; Label: Wind-up	4	—	—	96	MC: Platinum; RIAA: Gold
2007	Them vs. You vs. Me: Released: March 6, 2007; Label: Wind-up	2	37	17	31	MC: Platinum; RIAA: Gold
2010	Life Turns Electric: Released: October 5, 2010; Label: Wind-up	15	—	—	92	
2015	Five Crooked Lines: Released: July 31, 2015; Label: The Bicycle Music Company	15	—	—	—	
2025	Last Night on Earth: Released: November 7, 2025; Label: Better Noise	4				
"—" denotes a release that did not chart.

ALetters from Chutney was released under Finger Eleven's original name, Rainbow Butt Monkeys.

=== Live albums ===
Year	Album details
2010	iTunes Live from Montreal: Released: December 7, 2010; Label: Wind-up

=== Compilations ===
Year	Album details
2007	Us-vs-Then-vs-Now: Released: December 4, 2007; Label: Wind-up
2008	iTunes Originals: Released: October 28, 2008; Label: Wind-up
2023	Greatest Hits: Released: June 16, 2023; Label: Craft Recordings

=== EPs ===
Year	Album details
2007	Connect Sets: Released: June 19, 2007; Label: Wind-up
2007	Them vs. You vs. Me: Bonus Cuts: Released: December 18, 2007; Label: Wind-up

== Songs ==
=== Singles ===
Year	Song	Peak chart positions										Certifications	Album
Year	Song	CAN	CAN Rock	AUS	NZ	UK	US	US Adult	US Alt.	US Main.	US Pop	Certifications	Album
1995	"Circles"	17	—	—	—	—	—	—	—	—	—		Letters from Chutney
1995	"As Far as I Can Spit"	—	20	—	—	—	—	—	—	—	—		Letters from Chutney
1996	"Danananana"	—	—	—	—	—	—	—	—	—	—		Letters from Chutney
1997	"Tip"	—	—	—	—	—	—	—	—	—	—		Tip
1998	"Quicksand"	—	—	—	—	—	—	—	—	28	—		Tip
1999	"Above"	—	—	—	—	—	—	—	—	34	—		Tip
1999	"Awake and Dreaming"	—	—	—	—	—	—	—	—	—	—		Tip
2000	"Drag You Down"	—	—	—	—	—	—	—	—	—	—		The Greyest of Blue Skies
2000	"First Time"	—	—	—	—	—	—	—	—	—	—		The Greyest of Blue Skies
2001	"Bones + Joints"	—	—	—	—	—	—	—	—	—	—		The Greyest of Blue Skies
2003	"Good Times"	—	—	—	—	92	—	—	—	—	—		Finger Eleven
2003	"One Thing"	1	14	—	—	—	16	2	5	38	11		Finger Eleven
2004	"Absent Elements"	—	26	—	—	—	—	—	—	—	—		Finger Eleven
2005	"Thousand Mile Wish"	—	24	—	—	—	—	—	—	—	—		Finger Eleven
2007	"Paralyzer"	3	1	12	7	—	6	3	1	1	5	MC: 5× Platinum; RIAA: 6× Platinum; BPI: Silver; RMNZ: 2× Platinum	Them vs. You vs. Me
2007	"Falling On"	36	1	—	—	—	—	—	31	25	—		Them vs. You vs. Me
2007	"I'll Keep Your Memory Vague"	12	5	—	—	—	—	—	30	40	—		Them vs. You vs. Me
2008	"Talking to the Walls"	90	4	—	—	—	—	—	—	—	—		Them vs. You vs. Me
2008	"Ain't No Sunshine"	—	—	—	—	—	—	—	—	—	—		iTunes Originals
2010	"Living in a Dream"	42	1	—	—	—	—	—	14	10	—		Life Turns Electric
2011	"Whatever Doesn't Kill Me"	63	1	—	—	—	—	—	—	33	—		Life Turns Electric
2011	"Stone Soul"	—	—	—	—	—	—	—	—	—	—		Life Turns Electric
2011	"Pieces Fit"	—	4	—	—	—	—	—	—	—	—		Life Turns Electric
2015	"Wolves and Doors"	—	4	—	—	—	—	—	—	—	—		Five Crooked Lines
2015	"Gods of Speed"	—	41	—	—	—	—	—	—	—	—		Five Crooked Lines
2023	"Together Right"	20	1	—	—	—	—	—	—	39	—		Greatest Hits
2024	"Adrenaline"	—	2	—	—	—	—	—	—	17	—		Last Night on Earth
2025	"Blue Sky Mystery"	—	5	—	—	—	—	—	—	—	—		Last Night on Earth
2025	"Last Night on Earth"	—	35	—	—	—	—	—	—	—	—		Last Night on Earth
2025	"The Mountain"	—	1	—	—	—	—	—	—	—	—		Last Night on Earth
"—" denotes a release that did not chart.

Notes

- All Canadian chart positions from June 16, 2007, and onward are from the Canadian Hot 100. All positions before that date are from Canadian Singles Chart.

=== Compilation appearances ===
Year	Song	Album
2000	"Suffocate"	Scream 3: The Album
2000	"Daaam!" (Finger Eleven and Tha Alkaholiks)	Loud Rocks (Canadian version only)
2002	"Slow Chemical"	WWF Forceable Entry (Canadian version only)
2003	"Sad Exchange"	Daredevil: The Album
2003	"Stay in Shadow" (mislabeled as "Stand in Shadow")	The Texas Chainsaw Massacre: The Album
2004	"Slow Chemical"	The Punisher: The Album
2004	"One Thing"	Big Shiny Tunes, Vol. 9
2005	"Thousand Mile Wish (Elektra Mix)"	Elektra: The Album
2007	"Look at Me" (John Lennon cover)	Instant Karma: The Amnesty International Campaign to Save Darfur (iTunes version only)
2007	"Slow Chemical"	Raw Greatest Hits: The Music
2008	"Paralyzer"	Now That's What I Call Music! 27
2012	"Minds on Fire"	Frankenweenie Unleashed!

== Videos ==
=== Video albums ===
Year	Video details
2007	Us-vs-Then-vs-Now: Released: December 4, 2007; Label: Wind-up

=== Music videos ===
Year	Song	Director
1995	"Circles"	Anna Leah Maltezos
1996	"Danananana"	Unknown
1996	"As Far as I Can Spit"	Unknown
1998	"Tip"	Unknown
1999	"Above"	Ulf
2000	"Drag You Down"	Micha Dahan
2000	"First Time" (Mud lady version)	Richard Reines
2000	"First Time" (Band version)	Richard Reines
2001	"Bones + Joints"	Unknown
2003	"Good Times"	Nathan Cox
2003	"One Thing"	Glen Bennet
2004	"Absent Elements"	James Black
2005	"Thousand Mile Wish"	Glen Bennett
2007	"Paralyzer"	Barnaby Roper
2007	"Falling On"	Gavin Bowden
2007	"I'll Keep Your Memory Vague"	Barnaby Roper
Unknown, date most likely 2008	“Suffocate”	Self made
2008	"Talking to the Walls"	Unknown
2010	"Living in a Dream"	John "JP" Poliquin
2011	"Whatever Doesn't Kill Me"	Alon Isocianu
2015	"Wolves and Doors"	Alon Isocianu
2016	"Not Going to Be Afraid"	James Black
2023	"Together Right"	Martin Klapperbien
2024	"Adrenaline"	Myles Erfurth
2025	"Blue Sky Mystery"	Justin Alexis
2025	"Last Night on Earth"	Unknown
2026	"The Mountain"	Michael Lombardi

== In popular culture ==
=== Video games ===
- "Good Times", "Other Light" and "Conversations" were featured in the GameCube game 1080° Avalanche.
- "Good Times" was on the soundtrack of SSX 3.
- "Stay in Shadow" was on the soundtrack of Burnout 3: Takedown.
- "Paralyzer" is a playable song in Rock Revolution (including the DS version), plus Guitar Hero: Modern Hits for DS, Band Hero, and Rock Band via the Rock Band Network.

=== Film and television ===
- In 2002, the band recorded the song "Slow Chemical" for wrestler Kane. "One Thing" has been used several times by World Wrestling Entertainment on several shows and DVDs.
- Several of the band's songs have featured on the soundtracks to Marvel films. "Slow Chemical" appeared on the soundtrack to The Punisher, "Sad Exchange" was on 2003's Daredevil soundtrack and an Elektra mix of "Thousand Mile Wish" was featured in the credits of the 2005 movie Elektra.
- "First Time", "Stay and Drown", and "Drag You Down" were all featured in the Dragon Ball Z movies Lord Slug and Cooler's Revenge.
- "One Thing" was featured in the Scrubs episode "My Fault", as well as in episodes of Smallville and Third Watch. The short-lived TV series Life as We Know It featured "One Thing" at the end of the sixth episode, "Natural Disasters". The song was also featured in the short-lived science fiction series Jake 2.0, at the end of episode 10, "The Spy Who Really Liked Me".
- "Drag You Down" was featured in an episode of the television series John Doe.
- "Paralyzer" was featured in the 16th episode of the first season of Gossip Girl titled "All About My Brother".
- "Paralyzer" also featured in the pilot episode of Greek playing in the background at the Kappa Tau rush party.
- "Suffocate" appeared on the Scream 3 soundtrack.
- "Stay in Shadow" appeared on the soundtrack of the 2003 remake of The Texas Chainsaw Massacre, wrongly listed as "Stand in Shadow". Additionally, it is listed as track number 16, but it is actually the 15th track on the album.
- "Complicated Questions" appeared in the 16th episode of the second season of CSI: Miami titled "Invasion", playing distinctly in the background of the surfboard shop when a suspect was being questioned.
- Finger Eleven guest starred in episode 26 of the 11th season of MTV's Made. The episode also featured the song "Change the World" as well as "One Thing" and "Paralyzer".
- "Living in a Dream" was named the official theme song to the 2011 WWE Royal Rumble.

=== Other ===
- "Paralyzer" is featured in the rollercoaster "Hollywood Rip Ride Rockit" at Universal Studios Florida.
