= Us-vs-Then-vs-Now =

Video by Finger Eleven
- Released: (Canada) Tuesday, December 4, 2007 (United States) Tuesday, May 13, 2008
- Recorded: 1994–2007; Various locations
- Genre: Hard rock
- Length: 2 hours & 50 Mins
- Label: Wind-up

Finger Eleven chronology
| Finger Eleven (2003) | Us-vs-Then-vs-Now (2007) |

Us-vs-Then-vs-Now is the 2 disc, first full featured and second DVD by rock band Finger Eleven. It shows the band's career span in the past 13 years with never before seen concert footage, b-sides from their writing sessions of Finger Eleven and Them vs. You vs. Me, interviews, music videos and video journals. It was first released on iTunes. The title is a pun on their album Them vs. You vs. Me. The bassline for the song "Bend the Rules" turns out to be for the song "Them vs. You vs. Me".

== Reception ==
Melodic rated Us-vs-Then-vs-Now three stars.

== CD track listing ==
1. "Sacrifice" (Previously unreleased 2006) – 3:46
2. "Unspoken" (Previously unreleased 2003) – 3:37
3. "Paralyzer" (Original band demo) – 3:37
4. "One Thing" (Original band demo) – 4:17
5. "Change the World" (Original band demo) – 2:12
6. "1000 Mile Wish" (Original band demo) – 4:42
7. "Absent Elements" (Original band demo) – 4:48
8. "Sick of It All" (Sullen Mix) – 4:50
9. "Wake Up Demons" (Previously unreleased 2003) – 2:16
10. "Bend the Rules" (Previously unreleased 2006) – 3:17
11. "Song for an Awkward Moment" (Previously unreleased) – 2:47
12. "Key Loop" (Instrumental) – 3:28
13. "Murder My Mind's Eye" (Previously unreleased 2003) – 4:17
14. "Tearing Disguises" (Previously unreleased 2003) – 6:17

== DVD track listing ==
Now Live from the Warehouse Studio (Vancouver, March 2007) featuring the songs Paralyzer, Above, One Thing, I'll Keep Your Memory Vague, First Time and Obvious Heart Live from the Berkeley Church (Toronto, May 2007) featuring the songs Good Times, Lost My Way, So-So Suicide and Talking To The Walls

Then

1. "As Far as I Can Spit" (Rainbow Butt Monkeys Live at MuchMusic November 14, 1995)
2. "Transition Interview" (MuchMusic Interview April 14, 1999)
3. "Quicksand" (Live from CBGB, New York City, April 29, 1998)
4. "Drag You Down" (Live from The Opera House, Toronto, November 9, 2000)
5. "First Time" (The Video-Band Version)
6. "The Frying Pan Interview" (New York City, May 16, 2000)
7. "Drag You Down" (The Video)
8. "Good Times" (The Video)
9. "Complicated Questions" (Live at Snow Job, Newfoundland, March 24, 2003)
10. "One Thing" (The Video)
11. "Nardwuar Discusses Influences Interview" (Vancouver June 28, 2004)
12. "Absent Elements" (Live from The Showplace Theatre, Buffalo, April 17, 2003)
13. "Unspoken" (At VH1.com Live, New York City, March 10, 2004)
14. "Rich and Rick on Citadel Hill Interview" (MuchMusic Going Coastal, Halifax June 28, 2003)
15. "Good Times" (Breakout, Live at the Mac Hall, Calgary, September 25, 2003)
16. "Change the World" (The Video)
17. "Falling On" (The Video)
18. "Paralyzer" (The Video)
19. "I'll Keep Your Memory Vague" (The Video)
20. "Behind the Scenes" (Spring 2007 Canadian Tour)
