= List of number-one rock singles of 2007 (Canada) =

The following lists the number one rock singles in Canada in 2007 based on airplay from Mediabase which was published in Radio & Records magazine.

== Chart history ==
Issue date	Song	Artist(s)	Ref.
January 5	"Snow (Hey Oh)"	Red Hot Chili Peppers	
January 12	"Snow (Hey Oh)"	Red Hot Chili Peppers	
January 19	"Snow (Hey Oh)"	Red Hot Chili Peppers	
January 26	"Snow (Hey Oh)"	Red Hot Chili Peppers	
February 2	"Paralyzer"	Finger Eleven	
February 9	"Paralyzer"	Finger Eleven	
February 16	"Paralyzer"	Finger Eleven	
February 23	"Paralyzer"	Finger Eleven	
March 2	"Paralyzer"	Finger Eleven	
March 9	"Paralyzer"	Finger Eleven	
March 16	"Paralyzer"	Finger Eleven	
March 23	"Paralyzer"	Finger Eleven	
March 30	"Paralyzer"	Finger Eleven	
April 6	"Paralyzer"	Finger Eleven	
April 13	"Paralyzer"	Finger Eleven	
April 20	"Paralyzer"	Finger Eleven	
April 27	"Paralyzer"	Finger Eleven	
May 4	"What I've Done"	Linkin Park	
May 11	"What I've Done"	Linkin Park	
May 18	"What I've Done"	Linkin Park	
May 25	"What I've Done"	Linkin Park	
June 1	"What I've Done"	Linkin Park	
June 8	"What I've Done"	Linkin Park	
June 15	"What I've Done"	Linkin Park	
June 22	"What I've Done"	Linkin Park	
June 29	"What I've Done"	Linkin Park	
July 6	"What I've Done"	Linkin Park	
July 13	"What I've Done"	Linkin Park	
July 20	"What I've Done"	Linkin Park	
July 27	"What I've Done"	Linkin Park	
August 3	"What I've Done"	Linkin Park	
August 10	"Falling On"	Finger Eleven	
August 17	"Falling On"	Finger Eleven	
August 24	"The Pretender"	Foo Fighters	
August 31	"The Pretender"	Foo Fighters	
September 7	"The Pretender"	Foo Fighters	
September 14	"The Pretender"	Foo Fighters	
September 21	"The Pretender"	Foo Fighters	
September 28	"The Pretender"	Foo Fighters	
October 5	"The Pretender"	Foo Fighters	
October 12	"The Pretender"	Foo Fighters	
October 19	"The Pretender"	Foo Fighters	
October 26	"The Pretender"	Foo Fighters	
November 2	"The Pretender"	Foo Fighters	
November 9	"The Pretender"	Foo Fighters	
November 16	"The Pretender"	Foo Fighters	
November 23	"The Pretender"	Foo Fighters	
November 30	"Fake It"	Seether	
December 7	"Fake It"	Seether	
December 14	"Fake It"	Seether	
December 21	"Fake It"	Seether	
