= List of songs in the Guitar Hero: On Tour series =

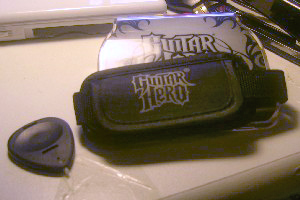
The Guitar Hero: On Tour series uses a special "Guitar Grip" game controller that adapts the Nintendo DS into a variation of the normal guitar controller used for the console versions of Guitar Hero.

The Guitar Hero: On Tour series is an expansion of the Guitar Hero series for the Nintendo DS portable console. The series is developed by Vicarious Visions and published by RedOctane and Activision. The game uses a "Guitar Grip" hardware unit that fits into the Game Boy Advance slot on the DS or DS Lite to recreate the experience of the console-based guitar controllers normally used with the game; this unit is incompatible with the Nintendo DSi and Nintendo 3DS due to the lack of the slot on the DSi hardware. The player uses fret buttons on the Grip while "strumming" using a stylus across the DS touchscreen to try to match notes as they scroll on the second screen in order to score points and complete each song.

There are three titles in the series: Guitar Hero: On Tour, Guitar Hero On Tour: Decades, and Guitar Hero On Tour: Modern Hits. Each game features a setlist with more than 25 songs, most based on master recordings. The games utilize the DS's local wireless features to allow two players to compete against each other. Players can compete using different versions of the games, allowing the songs of each game to be shared during play. The songs chosen in the setlists of all three games have significantly less objectionable content than the ones in mainstream console Guitar Hero titles, making the On Tour series the first and only games in the series to be rated Everyone 10+ by the ESRB.

== Guitar Hero: On Tour setlist ==
Guitar Hero: On Tour features two different setlists, one for primarily English-speaking regions including North America, the British Isles, and Australia, in addition to Japan and the Netherlands, and another for other non-English-speaking European countries, with five replacement songs; songs not in the game for that region are marked as "N/A" in the table below. Both setlists include 26 licensed tracks including five bonus tracks, with about 85% of them being master recordings; all other songs are cover versions recreated for the game. Twenty songs from the North American setlist were exclusive to this version of Guitar Hero upon release while the remaining six songs have been used throughout the series. Freezepop's "I Am Not Your Gameboy" is a bonus song that is unlocked by completing all the Guitar Duels on any difficulty in the game. Years in the table below reflect the year the song was recorded. Song in the game are presented as a series of tiers of increasing difficulty, requiring the player to complete the songs in each tier before the next tier is unlocked.

The setlist received a lukewarm reception. Game Informer stated that, compared to the setlists for other Guitar Hero games, the songs "skew away from great guitar rock and into the territory of pop/rock", and "just aren't as exciting to play". IGN commented that the setlist was "a little debatable" and "clearly being aimed at a friendlier, mainstream, pop-friendly crowd".

Year	Song title	Artist	Master recording	NA/UK/AUS/JPN/NL tier	European tier	Mainline game(s) featured
1999	"All Star"	Smash Mouth	Yes	2. Rooftop	2. Rooftop	—N/a
1999	"All the Small Things"	Blink-182	Yes	1. Subway	1. Subway	Guitar Hero 5 (DLC)
2006	"Anna Molly"	Incubus	Yes	5. Battleship	5. Battleship	—N/a
2003	"Are You Gonna Be My Girl"	Jet	Yes	1. Subway	1. Subway	—N/a
1995	"Avalancha"	Héroes del Silencio	Yes	—N/a	4. Greek Arena	Guitar Hero III: Legends of Rock (Bonus)
1970	"Black Magic Woman (Cover)"	Santana	No	4. Greek Arena	3. Parade (encore)	Guitar Hero III: Legends of Rock
1991	"Breed"	Nirvana	Yes	2. Rooftop	2. Rooftop	—N/a
2006	"Ça Me Vexe"	Mademoiselle K	Yes	—N/a	3. Parade	—N/a
1973	"China Grove"	The Doobie Brothers	Yes	3. Parade	—N/a	—N/a
2005	"Do What You Want"	OK Go	Yes	1. Subway	1. Subway	Guitar Hero 5 (DLC)
2004	"Heaven"	Los Lonely Boys	Yes	3. Parade	—N/a	—N/a
2005	"Helicopter"	Bloc Party	Yes	3. Parade	3. Parade	Guitar Hero III: Legends of Rock
1980	"Hit Me with Your Best Shot (Cover)"	Pat Benatar	Yes	2. Rooftop	2. Rooftop	Guitar Hero III: Legends of Rock
2004	"I Am Not Your Game Boy"	Freezepop	Yes	Bonus	Bonus	—N/a
2007	"I Don't Wanna Stop"	Ozzy Osbourne	Yes	5. Battleship	5. Battleship	—N/a
1977	"I Know a Little (Cover)"	Lynyrd Skynyrd	No	5. Battleship (encore)	5. Battleship (encore)	—N/a
1981	"Jessie's Girl"	Rick Springfield	Yes	2. Rooftop	—N/a	Guitar Hero World Tour (DLC)
1977	"Jet Airliner (Cover)"	Steve Miller Band	No	4. Greek Arena	—N/a	—N/a
1989	"Knock Me Down"	Red Hot Chili Peppers	Yes	5. Battleship	5. Battleship	—N/a
1973	"La Grange (Cover)"	ZZ Top	No	4. Greek Arena	4. Greek Arena	Guitar Hero III: Legends of Rock
2004	"Monster"	Beatsteaks	Yes	—N/a	2. Rooftop	—N/a
2007	"Monsoon"	Tokio Hotel	Yes	—N/a	3. Parade	Guitar Hero World Tour
1983	"Pride and Joy (Cover)"	Stevie Ray Vaughan	Yes	5. Battleship	5. Battleship	Guitar Hero III: Legends of Rock
1975	"Rock and Roll All Nite (Cover)"	Kiss	No	3. Parade	3. Parade	Guitar Hero III: Legends of Rock; Guitar Hero: Smash Hits
1986	"Rock the Night"	Europe	Yes	—N/a	4. Greek Arena	—N/a
1995	"Spiderwebs"	No Doubt	Yes	1. Subway	1. Subway	Guitar Hero World Tour
1981	"Stray Cat Strut"	Stray Cats	Yes	4. Greek Arena	4. Greek Arena	—N/a
2002	"This Love"	Maroon 5	Yes	2. Rooftop (encore)	2. Rooftop (encore)	Guitar Hero 5 (DLC)
1984	"We're Not Gonna Take It"	Twisted Sister	Yes	1. Subway (encore)	1. Subway (encore)	Guitar Hero: Warriors of Rock
2006	"What I Want"	Daughtry featuring Slash	Yes	3. Parade (encore)	—N/a	—N/a
1989	"Youth Gone Wild (Cover)"	Skid Row	No	4. Greek Arena (encore)	4. Greek Arena (encore)	—N/a

== Guitar Hero On Tour: Decades setlist ==
Decades's setlist is considered "a trek through time" by IGN, featuring sets of five songs out of a total of twenty-eight tracks. Each set focuses on a specific era of rock music, including two called "2000s" and "Modern". Each set has a specialized venue for the era. Once all the songs in the set are completed, the player is presented with a final encore song for that set while also unlocking the next set. Additional bonus tracks are unlocked for completing specific requirements in the game. All songs are master recordings as opposed to cover versions used in the previous game. The full setlist for the game is listed below. The setlists are different for the North American, UK, and European releases. Seven songs in each are exclusive to the respective versions, and are listed as "N/A" when not available for that region's release.

The Decades setlist was considered to be an improvement over the original On Tour, with more songs that would be "much more appealing to fans" of the console versions of Guitar Hero". IGN felt that the setlist "starts out bad but starts getting more enjoyable as you unlock the earlier decades".

Year	Song title	Artist	North American version	European version	UK/NL/Australian version	Mainline game(s) featured
1970	"All Right Now"	Free	1970s	1970s	1970s	—N/a
1980	"Any Way You Want It"	Journey	1980s	—N/a	1980s	Guitar Hero III: Legends of Rock (DLC)
1993	"Are You Gonna Go My Way"	Lenny Kravitz	1990s	1990s	1990s	Guitar Hero World Tour
1994	"Buddy Holly"	Weezer	1990s	1990s	1990s	—N/a
2003	"Can't Stop"	Red Hot Chili Peppers	2000s	2000s	2000s	—N/a
2007	"Crushcrushcrush"	Paramore	Modern	—N/a	Modern	—N/a
2005	"Dirty Little Secret"	The All-American Rejects	Modern	—N/a	—N/a	Band Hero
2006	"Diventerai Una Star"	Finley	—N/a	Modern	—N/a	—N/a
1999	"Down"	Stone Temple Pilots	1990s (encore)	1990s (encore)	1990s (encore)	—N/a
2007	"Estrella Polar"	Pereza	—N/a	Modern	—N/a	—N/a
2004	"Everything is Everything"	Phoenix	—N/a	2000s	Bonus	—N/a
1982	"Eye of the Tiger"	Survivor	—N/a	1980s	1980s	Guitar Hero World Tour
1972	"Free Ride"	Edgar Winter Group	1970s	1970s	1970s	Guitar Hero: Warriors of Rock
2003	"I Believe in a Thing Called Love"	The Darkness	2000s (encore)	Bonus	2000s (encore)	—N/a
1984	"I Can't Drive 55"	Sammy Hagar	1980s	—N/a	—N/a	—N/a
1987	"La Bamba"	Los Lobos	1980s	1980s	1980s	Guitar Hero World Tour
2001	"The Middle"	Jimmy Eat World	2000s	2000s	2000s	Guitar Hero World Tour
1992	"No Rain"	Blind Melon	1990s	1990s	1990s	Guitar Hero World Tour (DLC)
2000	"One Step Closer"	Linkin Park	2000s	2000s	2000s	—N/a
1987	"The One I Love"	R.E.M.	1980s	1980s	1980s	Guitar Hero World Tour
1978	"One Way or Another"	Blondie	1970s	1970s	1970s	Guitar Hero World Tour
2007	"The Pretender"	Foo Fighters	Modern	Modern (encore)	Modern	Guitar Hero III: Legends of Rock (DLC)
2007	"Ready, Set, Go!"	Tokio Hotel	—N/a	Modern	Modern	—N/a
2004	"Remedy"	Seether	2000s	—N/a	—N/a	—N/a
1976	"Rock and Roll Band"	Boston	1970s	—N/a	1970s	Guitar Hero World Tour (DLC)
1987	"Satch Boogie"	Joe Satriani	Bonus	1980s	Bonus	Guitar Hero World Tour
2001	"Smooth Criminal"	Alien Ant Farm	Bonus	Bonus	2000s	—N/a
1995	"Some Might Say"	Oasis	—N/a	1990s	1990s	Guitar Hero World Tour
1976	"Sweet Home Alabama" (Live)	Lynyrd Skynyrd	1970s (encore)	1970s	1970s (encore)	Guitar Hero World Tour
2007	"Tarantula"	The Smashing Pumpkins	Modern (encore)	Bonus	Modern (encore)	—N/a
2007	"The Take Over, the Breaks Over"	Fall Out Boy	Modern	Modern	Modern	Guitar Hero 5 (DLC)
1997	"Volcano Girls"	Veruca Salt	1990s	—N/a	—N/a	—N/a
1977	"We Are The Champions"	Queen	Bonus	1970s	Bonus	Guitar Hero World Tour (DLC)
2003	"You Can't Stop Me"	Guano Apes	—N/a	2000s	—N/a	—N/a
1986	"You Give Love a Bad Name"	Bon Jovi	1980s (encore)	1980s	1980s (encore)	Guitar Hero 5

== Guitar Hero On Tour: Modern Hits setlist ==
Modern Hits's setlist features songs released since 2000. The full setlist features 28 songs, all based on master recordings. Like the previous game in the series, On Tour: Decades, the set list is different for the North American, UK, and European releases with twelve exclusive tracks in each of the respective versions (the European release has eight exclusive tracks that are the same as the UK version and four other tracks from Europe).

The Modern Hits setlist is said to cover "guitar-heavy hits from the past five years" with "plenty of noteworthy songs", and considered to be a "compelling blend of tracks".

Year	Song title	Artist	North American venues	European venues	UK venues	Mainline game(s) featured
2006	"'54, '74, '90, 2010"	Sportfreunde Stiller	—N/a	04. Laser Lights - Opening Act	—N/a	Guitar Hero World Tour (DLC)
2008	"Adrenaline"	12 Stones	09. Casino Vicarious - Headline Act	—N/a	—N/a	—N/a
2002	"All My Life"	Foo Fighters	08. Shanghai - Opening Act	10. Shanghai - Headline Act	09. Casino Vicarious - Headline Act	Guitar Hero III: Legends of Rock (DLC)
2008	"Always Where I Need to Be"	The Kooks	08. Shanghai - Opening Act	09. Casino Vicarious - Headline Act	09. Casino Vicarious - Headline Act	—N/a
2003	"The Bitter End"	Placebo	—N/a	06. Casino Vicarious - Opening Act	05. County Fair - Headline Act	Guitar Hero World Tour (DLC)
2000	"Bohemian Like You"	The Dandy Warhols	—N/a	03. Rusty Rocco's - Headline Act	03. Rusty Rocco's - Headline Act	—N/a
2007	"Call to Arms"	Angels & Airwaves	05. County Fair - Headline Act	—N/a	07. Laser Lights - Headline Act	—N/a
2006	"Chelsea Dagger"	The Fratellis	02. County Fair - Opening Act	05. County Fair - Headline Act	05. County Fair - Headline Act	—N/a
2007	"Dashboard"	Modest Mouse	05. County Fair - Headline Act	—N/a	—N/a	—N/a
2006	"Dimension"	Wolfmother	01. Rusty Rocco's - Opening Act	01. Rusty Rocco's - Opening Act	01. Rusty Rocco's - Opening Act	Guitar Hero World Tour (DLC)
2008	"Do the Panic"	Phantom Planet	02. County Fair - Opening Act	—N/a	04. Laser Lights - Opening Act	—N/a
2008	"Everybody Get Dangerous"	Weezer	06. Casino Vicarious - Opening Act	08. Shanghai - Opening Act	08. Shanghai - Opening Act	—N/a
2005	"The Fallen"	Franz Ferdinand	04. Laser Lights - Opening Act	07. Laser Lights - Headline Act	06. Casino Vicarious - Opening Act	—N/a
2008	"Falling Down"	Atreyu	09. Casino Vicarious - Headline Act	—N/a	10. Shanghai - Headline Act	—N/a
2007	"Golden Skans"	Klaxons	—N/a	01. Rusty Rocco's - Opening Act	01. Rusty Rocco's - Opening Act	—N/a
2008	"Half-Truism"	The Offspring	04. Laser Lights - Opening Act	07. Laser Lights - Headline Act	06. Casino Vicarious - Opening Act	—N/a
2007	"I Wanna Be Your Man"	Endeverafter	10. Shanghai - Headline Act	—N/a	—N/a	—N/a
2003	"In the Shadows"	The Rasmus	—N/a	02. County Fair - Opening Act	02. County Fair - Opening Act	Guitar Hero World Tour (DLC)
2008	"Lassoo"	The Duke Spirit	05. County Fair - Headline Act	—N/a	07. Laser Lights - Headline Act	—N/a
2005	"Lights and Sounds"	Yellowcard	07. Laser Lights - Headline Act	—N/a	—N/a	—N/a
2006	"The Metal"	Tenacious D	09. Casino Vicarious - Headline Act	10. Shanghai - Headline Act	10. Shanghai - Headline Act	Guitar Hero III: Legends of Rock
2005	"Miss Murder"	AFI	07. Laser Lights - Headline Act	09. Casino Vicarious - Headline Act	08. Shanghai - Opening Act	Guitar Hero III: Legends of Rock; Guitar Hero: Smash Hits
2006	"Napoleon Says"	Phoenix	—N/a	05. County Fair - Headline Act	—N/a	—N/a
2007	"On Call"	Kings of Leon	—N/a	03. Rusty Rocco's - Headline Act	03. Rusty Rocco's - Headline Act	—N/a
2007	"Our Velocity"	Maxïmo Park	—N/a	05. County Fair - Headline Act	04. Laser Lights - Opening Act	—N/a
2007	"Paralyzer"	Finger Eleven	10. Shanghai - Headline Act	—N/a	—N/a	Band Hero
2004	"Que No"	Deluxe	—N/a	03. Rusty Rocco's - Headline Act	—N/a	—N/a
2003	"Reptilia"	The Strokes	03. Rusty Rocco's - Headline Act	06. Casino Vicarious - Opening Act	06. Casino Vicarious - Opening Act	Guitar Hero III: Legends of Rock
2007	"Ruby"	Kaiser Chiefs	06. Casino Vicarious - Opening Act	08. Shanghai - Opening Act	08. Shanghai - Opening Act	Guitar Hero III: Legends of Rock (Bonus)
2008	"Scream Aim Fire"	Bullet For My Valentine	—N/a	10. Shanghai - Headline Act	10. Shanghai - Headline Act	Guitar Hero World Tour
2008	"Shockwave"	Black Tide	10. Shanghai - Headline Act	—N/a	—N/a	—N/a
2002	"Still Waiting"	Sum 41	07. Laser Lights - Headline Act	09. Casino Vicarious - Headline Act	09. Casino Vicarious - Headline Act	Guitar Hero 5 (DLC)
2007	"Sweet Sacrifice"	Evanescence	03. Rusty Rocco's - Headline Act	06. Casino Vicarious - Opening Act	05. County Fair - Headline Act	—N/a
2006	"This Ain't a Scene, It's an Arms Race"	Fall Out Boy	06. Casino Vicarious - Opening Act	08. Shanghai - Opening Act	07. Laser Lights - Headline Act	Guitar Hero 5 (DLC)
2005	"Unconditional"	The Bravery	03. Rusty Rocco's - Headline Act	—N/a	—N/a	—N/a
2008	"Via Le Mani Dagli Occhi"	Negramaro	—N/a	07. Laser Lights - Headline Act	—N/a	—N/a
2008	"Violet Hill"	Coldplay	01. Rusty Rocco's - Opening Act	02. County Fair - Opening Act	02. County Fair - Opening Act	Guitar Hero III: Legends of Rock (DLC)
2007	"What Do I Have to Do"	The Donnas	08. Shanghai - Opening Act	—N/a	—N/a	—N/a
2007	"When You're Gone"	Avril Lavigne	—N/a	01. Rusty Rocco's - Opening Act	01. Rusty Rocco's - Opening Act	—N/a
2004	"Where Are We Runnin'?"	Lenny Kravitz	01. Rusty Rocco's - Opening Act	04. Laser Lights - Opening Act	03. Rusty Rocco's - Headline Act	—N/a
