= Last Night on Earth (Finger Eleven album) =

Studio album by Finger Eleven
- Released: November 7, 2025
- Recorded: 2015–2025
- Studio: Ontario, Canada
- Genres: Alternative rock; post-grunge; hard rock
- Length: 40:03
- Label: Better Noise
- Producers: Steve Molella; James Black; Rick Jackett; Scott Anderson; Sean Anderson; Ted Jensen

Finger Eleven chronology
Greatest Hits (2023)	Last Night on Earth (2025)

Singles from Last Night on Earth
- 1. "Adrenaline" Released: August 2, 2024; 2. "Blue Sky Mystery" Released: August 1, 2025; 3. "Last Night on Earth" Released: September 18, 2025; 4. "The Mountain" Released: November 7, 2025

Last Night on Earth is the eighth studio album by the Canadian rock band Finger Eleven, released on November 7, 2025, through Better Noise Music. It follows the band's 2023 Greatest Hits album, marks their first album released with their new label, Better Noise, and is the group's first release of a full-length album of new music in over ten years, the last being July 2015's Five Crooked Lines.

== Background and production ==
Following the release of Five Crooked Lines in 2015, the group entered an extended hiatus from studio recording. In 2023, they re-emerged with their first-ever Greatest Hits compilation, which included two new tracks: "Together Right" — their first original song in more than seven years — and a cover of Pink Floyd's "Welcome to the Machine." "Together Right" reached number 39 on Billboard's Canada Rock chart and topped the Canadian Mediabase Active Rock chart for six consecutive weeks, earning the band a SOCAN No. 1 Song Award in March 2024.

Encouraged by the renewed attention, the band returned to the studio in late 2023 to begin work on a new album. Guitarist Rick Jackett stated that the success of the single "reignited [their] creative spark," inspiring the group to "get back into a room and start writing together again."

In July 2024, the band signed a new deal with Better Noise Music, marking their first label partnership in nearly a decade. Guitarist James Black confirmed in May 2025 that the album had been completed, remarking, "We thought last year we'd put 'Adrenaline' out and be finished a couple of months later, but it took a whole other year to get it right. It's done, and it's called Last Night on Earth."

The recording process was highly collaborative. Jackett explained that writing took place primarily in shared in-person sessions, rejecting digital "Dropbox" songwriting used on prior releases. "It was old school," he said, "five guys in a room bouncing ideas off each other, like when we made our first record." The band emphasized a democratic approach, with all members contributing to song arrangements and last-minute revisions; "Cold Concrete", for instance, was rewritten during the final mix to improve its bridge section.

Drummer Steve Molella co-produced the album alongside the band, with mixing by Jay Dufour and mastering by Ted Jensen. Bassist Sean Anderson composed “Wall Dogs,” marking one of the few instances where he wrote both music and lyrics for a Finger Eleven track. Jackett noted that the band decided to include the piano-based song after re-recording it as a surprise gift for Anderson one Christmas, saying it “instantly became a Finger Eleven song.”

=== Release and promotion ===
The band's signing to Better Noise Music was followed by the June 2024 release of the single "Adrenaline". Originally intended as the title track, the band ultimately renamed the album Last Night on Earth. "Adrenaline" reached the top 20 on the Mediabase Active Rock chart in the United States and peaked at number two on the Canadian Active Rock chart.

On August 1, 2025, "Blue Sky Mystery" was released as the second single from the album. The song features guest vocals from Filter frontman Richard Patrick, who said, "Working with Scott, James, Rick, Sean and Steve could not have gone smoother. They are good guys and total pros." The single reached number seven on the Billboard Canada Mainstream Rock chart and number two on Canada's Mediabase Active Rock chart, remaining in the top five for over four months.

The album's title track was issued as the third single on September 18, 2025, accompanied by an official music video. The acoustic-driven ballad was described by Molella as "the most natural the song has ever sounded," focusing lyrically on the collapse of a relationship.

In summer 2025, the group joined Creed on the Summer of '99 and Beyond North American tour before launching a Canadian fall tour with the Tea Party and Headstones, promoting both the album and its singles.

On the same day of the album's worldwide release it was announced "The Mountain" would be released as its the fourth single.

== Composition and sound ==
Last Night on Earth incorporates the band's characteristic blend of alternative rock and post-grunge while adding melodic and rhythmic influences from 1960s and 1970s rock. Guitarist Rick Jackett described the album as "a big rock record… we'd veered away from that, but it was time to go back and embrace the bigness of the sound. Even the soft songs sound big." The band cited Phil Collins and Genesis as notable melodic inspirations.

Thematically, the record explores perseverance, creative renewal, and emotional conflict. Tracks such as "Adrenaline" and "Cold Concrete" focus on endurance and personal growth, while "Wall Dogs" and the acoustic title track examine vulnerability and relationships. Anderson characterized the album as "the best representation of our entire canon of work… some of our heaviest moments and some of our softest," emphasizing the group's desire to create a "true-to-form Finger Eleven record" rather than follow contemporary trends.

== Critical reception ==
Contrasting the lukewarm reception of their previous album of entirely new material, Last Night on Earth garnered some of the highest reviews of their career. Critics cited the wide range of tones, consistently expansive sound, and tangible chemistry between the bandmates as the standout traits of the album, with highlight-worthy attention given to tracks "Lock Me Up" and "Blue Sky Mystery."

Chaoszine gave the album a 4.5 out of 5, noting that the outing provides substance in an accessible, well-polished, fresh package. Heavy Magazine said that the band "manage to keep things fresh and interesting in what has become an increasingly formulaic genre" with their refusal to stagnate stylistically "which can only be a good thing."

Summarizing the album, Paul Monkhouse of MetalTalk called the album "a bold, emotional comeback with soaring choruses, big riffs, and stadium-ready energy," and deemed "Blue Sky Mystery" as "a late competitor for biggest tune this year." Gerrod Harris of The Spill Magazine was the least enthused of the scored critical reviews, but remained largely positive, allotting the record a 7 out of 10, with praise directed at Lock Me Up and its "densely-layered and grungy arrangement," as well as heavier tracks like "The Mountain" and "Perfect Effigy," concluding with a sentiment shared by most other reviewers, that Last Night on Earth demonstrates "the raw energy and sensibilities that have made Finger Eleven one of Canada's most enduring bands of the past two decades."

== Track listing ==
All tracks are written by Scott Anderson, Sean Anderson, James Black, Rick Jackett, and Steve Molella.

No.	Title	Length
1.	"Adrenaline"	3:25
2.	"Blue Sky Mystery" (featuring Filter)	3:15
3.	"Cold Concrete"	3:53
4.	"Lock Me Up"	3:50
5.	"Last Night on Earth"	3:44
6.	"The Mountain"	3:22
7.	"Perfect Effigy"	3:35
8.	"Wall Dogs"	4:07
9.	"Laughing at the Storm"	4:26
10.	"Body and Mind"	3:54
11.	"Blue Sky Mystery"	3:15
Total length:		40:35

== Personnel ==
- Scott Anderson – lead vocals
- James Black – lead guitar, co-producer
- Rick Jackett – rhythm guitar, co-producer
- Sean Anderson – bass guitar, co-producer
- Steve Molella – drums, percussion, producer

=== Technical personnel ===
- Jay Dufour – mixing
- Ted Jensen – mastering
