= James Black (guitarist) =

Canadian musician

- Born: August 31, 1975 (age 50); Burlington, Ontario, Canada
- Genres: Alternative rock; alternative metal; post-grunge; hard rock; nu metal; experimental
- Occupations: Musician; singer; songwriter
- Instruments: Guitar; vocals
- Years active: 1990–present
- Label: Written In Black Inc.
- Member of: Finger Eleven; Blackie Jackett Jr

James Black (born August 31, 1975) is a Canadian guitarist, singer, songwriter and musician based in Toronto, Ontario. Black is best known for his role as the lead guitarist in the band Finger Eleven since 1990, and co-founder, guitarist, and singer of Blackie Jackett Jr.

Black is also known for occasionally stepping in for Evanescence's guitarist Troy McLawhorn. Additionally, he appears on "Gone" by Justin Nozuka, RZA, Kobra Khan, and himself, released on November 14, 2011.

== Career ==
=== Finger Eleven ===
James Black is the lead guitarist, backing vocalist and a founding member of rock band Finger Eleven – formerly known as Rainbow Butt Monkeys. As a band, they have released 6 studio albums, 1 live album, 2 EPs and 22 singles. An update on January 29, 2015 indicated that preparations were in the final stages of production and promised new details and artwork in the near future.

The band released their seventh album Five Crooked Lines on July 31, 2015, and released the lead single "Wolves and Doors" to Canadian radio. They set upon the Fall of the Hammer Tour in support of the release.

=== Blackie Jackett Jr ===
Blackie Jackett Jr is the side project of James Black with Finger Eleven bandmate Rick Jackett. They are joined by Jimmy Reid, Sandra Dee, Scott Brewer, Tino Zolfo and Neil Angus Macintosh. The alternative country band has released 1 full album and 2 singles since 2011.

=== Solo career ===
Working under his own name, James Black's solo career is his most recent brainchild. To date, he has released one album entitled Moon Boot Cocoon.

== Moon Boot Cocoon ==
Black's first solo album debuted May 27, 2014. The experimental rock album was produced by Tino Zolfo. On Moon Boot Cocoon, Black plays all of the instruments except for the drums. It was primarily released digitally, however, through a Pledge Music campaign he released a number of Vinyl and CD to individual contributors.

On March 14, 2015, 102.1 The Edge premiered the official video "Color Blind" on their website.

== Discography ==
=== Solo ===
- 2014: Moon Boot Cocoon

=== Finger Eleven ===
- 1995: Letters from Chutney
- 1998: Tip
- 2000: The Greyest of Blue Skies
- 2003: Finger Eleven
- 2007: Them vs. You vs. Me (Deluxe Edition)
- 2007: Them vs. You vs. Me
- 2007: Them vs. You vs. Me (Bonus Cuts) [EP]
- 2007: Connect Sets (Live) [EP]
- 2008: iTunes Originals: Finger Eleven
- 2008: Falling On [EP]
- 2010: Life Turns Electric
- 2010: iTunes Live from Montreal
- 2015: Five Crooked Lines
- 2025: Last Night on Earth

=== Blackie Jackett Jr ===
- 2011: Whisky and Tears
- 2013: Honky Tonk Santa (Single)
- 2014: I Got Stoned and I Missed It (Single)

== Awards and nominations ==
Year	Group	Award	Category
1996	Finger Eleven	Juno	Nomination: Breakout Group of the Year
2001	Finger Eleven	Juno	Nomination: Rock Album of the Year (The Greyest of Blue Skies)
2004	Finger Eleven	Juno	Nomination: Group of the Year
2005	Finger Eleven	Juno	Nomination: Single of the Year (One Thing)
2008	Finger Eleven	Juno	Nomination: Group of the Year
2008	Finger Eleven	Juno	Nomination: Single of the Year (Paralyzer)
2008	Finger Eleven	Juno	Won: Rock Album of the Year (Them vs. You vs. Me)
2009	Blackie Jackett Jr	Hamilton Music Award	Won: Country Record of the Year (Whisky and Tears)
2009	Blackie Jackett Jr	Hamilton Music Award	Nomination: New Artist/Group of the Year
2011	Finger Eleven	Juno	Nomination: Rock Album of the Year (Life Turns Electric)
