= Good Times (Finger Eleven song) =

Single by Finger Eleven

from the album Finger Eleven
- Released: April 29, 2003
- Genre: Hard rock; alternative rock
- Length: 3:55
- Label: Wind-up
- Songwriters: Scott Anderson; Sean Anderson; Rich Beddoe; James Black; Rick Jackett
- Producer: Johnny K

Finger Eleven singles chronology
"Bones + Joints" (2001)	"Good Times" (2003)	"One Thing" (2003)

Music video
- "Good Times" on YouTube

"Good Times" is a song by Canadian hard rock band Finger Eleven, released in April 2003 as the lead single from their eponymous album. It is more upbeat than their previous singles.

== Music video ==
The "Good Times" music video features the band playing at the Ice Hotel in Quebec. Beyond Canada, it aired on MTV2.

== Video games ==
"Good Times" plays in the video games SSX 3 and 1080° Avalanche.

== Track listing ==
1. "Good Times"
2. "Quicksand"
3. "Complicated Questions"
4. "Good Times" (video)

== Chart performance ==
Chart (2003)	Peak position
UK Singles (Official Charts)	92
UK Rock & Metal (Official Charts)	16
