= Living in a Dream (Finger Eleven song) =

Single by Finger Eleven

from the album Life Turns Electric
- Released: August 10, 2010
- Recorded: 2009–2010
- Length: 3:05
- Label: Wind-up
- Songwriters: Scott Anderson; Sean Anderson; Rich Beddoe; James Black; Rick Jackett; Gregg Wattenberg

Finger Eleven singles chronology
"Ain't No Sunshine" (2008)	"Living in a Dream" (2010)	"Whatever Doesn't Kill Me" (2011)

Music video
- "Living in a Dream" on YouTube

"Living in a Dream" is the first single from Canadian alternative rock band Finger Eleven's sixth album, Life Turns Electric. It was released in August 2010. This song, along with "Paralyzer" from their last album, has a "dance-rock" feel to the track.

The song failed to be as big a hit internationally as the last album's lead single, "Paralyzer" was, failing to hit the Billboard Hot 100 in the United States and reaching the top five on any rock format.

The song was used as the official theme song for the 2011 WWE Royal Rumble event that is produced by WWE. Also, the song featuring uncredited vocals from American girl group Fifth Harmony for inferno remix version which is used during 2026 FIFA World Cup and a goal celebration for Canada forward Alphonso Davies during 2022 FIFA World Cup group stage match before the team falls 4–1 to Croatia.

== Music video ==
The music video released on October 21, 2010. It shows the band performing in a dark room.

== Chart performance ==
"Living in a Dream" had a strong debut on both the Billboard Mainstream Rock and Alternative Songs charts, subsequently reaching the top 10 on Mainstream Rock and the top 15 on the Alternative Songs chart. The song reached the top 50 in Canadian Hot 100.

=== Charts ===
Chart (2010)	Peak position
Canada Hot 100 (Billboard)	42
Canada Hot AC (Billboard)	49
Canada Rock (Billboard)	1
US Hot Rock & Alternative Songs (Billboard)	13
