= Whatever Doesn't Kill Me =

Single by Finger Eleven

from the album Life Turns Electric
- Released: February 2, 2011
- Genre: Alternative rock; post-grunge
- Length: 3:37
- Label: Wind-up
- Songwriter: Finger Eleven

Finger Eleven singles chronology
"Living in a Dream" (2010)	"Whatever Doesn't Kill Me" (2011)	"Stone Soul" (2011)

Music video
- "Whatever Doesn't Kill Me" on YouTube

"Whatever Doesn't Kill Me" is a song by Canadian alternative rock band Finger Eleven, released in February 2011 as the second single from their sixth album Life Turns Electric.

== Chart performance ==
The single peaked at number 63 on the Billboard Canadian Hot 100 chart on 12 February 2011, spending a total of 12 weeks on the chart.

Chart (2011)	Peak position
Canada Hot 100 (Billboard)	63
Canada Hot AC (Billboard)	39
Canada Rock (Billboard)	1
US Mainstream Rock (Billboard)	33
