= Letters from Chutney =

Studio album by Rainbow Butt Monkeys
- Released: April 19, 1995
- Studios: Mainway, Burlington, Ontario; Metalworks, Mississauga, Ontario
- Genres: Rock; pop metal
- Length: 49:57
- Label: Mercury
- Producers: John Punter, Atilla Turi

Rainbow Butt Monkeys chronology
Letters from Chutney (1995)	Tip (1997)

Singles from Letters from Chutney
- 1. "Circles" Released: 1995; 2. "As Far as I Can Spit" Released: 1996; 3. "Danananana" Released: 1996

Letters from Chutney is the debut album by the Canadian rock band Rainbow Butt Monkeys, later known as Finger Eleven. It features a different sound than Finger Eleven's subsequent albums, with rock, pop, funk, and metal influences. The album produced three singles, all of which had videos released. The name of the album comes from a dog with a missing eye that the band found on the side of the road. They gave it the name Chutney. The album peaked at No. 45 on the RPM Canadian Albums Chart.

== Critical reception ==
Professional ratings
Review scores
Source	Rating
AllMusic	3/5 stars
Rock Hard	8.0/10

The Ottawa Citizen determined that "this is music that settles firmly on the metal edge of pop."

== Track listing ==
All songs by Rainbow Butt Monkeys.

No.	Title	Length
1.	"As Far as I Can Spit"	3:56
2.	"Danananana"	4:54
3.	"Brat"	3:57
4.	"Circles"	4:31
5.	"Spiderprints"	4:01
6.	"Nibber"	3:34
7.	"Dropping"	3:41
8.	"St. Louis"	3:15
9.	"Scrumpy"	3:22
10.	"Cake"	4:08
11.	"Cookin' in the Kitchen"	5:22
12.	"Let's Pretend"	5:16

== Personnel ==
Adapted from the liner notes of Letters from Chutney.

Rainbow Butt Monkeys

- Scott Anderson – vocals
- James Black – guitar, vocals
- Rick Jackett – guitar
- Sean Anderson – bass
- Rob Gommerman – drums

Production

- John Punter – engineering, mixing
- Atilla Turi – engineering
- L. Stu Young – engineering
- Sean McKim – engineering, assistant engineer
- Andre Plante – engineering, assistant engineer
- Kurtys Kidd – assistant engineer
- David Tedesco – assistant engineer
- Bill Kipper – mastering

Artwork

- Cy Anderson – cover
- Andrew MacNaughtan – band photography
