= I'll Keep Your Memory Vague =

Single by Finger Eleven

from the album Them vs. You vs. Me
- Released: October 12, 2007
- Genre: Alternative rock
- Length: 3:46
- Label: Wind-up
- Songwriters: Scott Anderson, Sean Anderson, Rich Beddoe, James Black, Rick Jackett
- Producer: Johnny K

Finger Eleven singles chronology
"Falling On" (2007)	"I'll Keep Your Memory Vague" (2007)	"Talking to the Walls" (2008)

Music video
- "I'll Keep Your Memory Vague" on YouTube

"I'll Keep Your Memory Vague" is the third single (final in the U.S. because "Talking to the Walls" was only released in Canada) and also the third track on Finger Eleven's fifth studio album Them vs. You vs. Me. It is also Finger Eleven's second single to be played on adult contemporary radio stations ("One Thing" is the other).

== Music video ==
It starts with a woman in her parked car, crying while looking at a picture of a man and her, with the band playing nearby in a parking lot in the night with lights surrounding them. As the woman drives she sees the man in the reflection of her mirror. She then gets out of the car to check if he's there, when he's not she wanders off in the streets, grabbing Scott Anderson thinking it's him. She goes into a late-night shop and sees the man through the aisles, seeing multiples of him. She then heads to the washroom as she screams and cries and looks in the mirror at the end when all along the reflection shows it is the man as he grabs a crumpled picture of him and the woman as the video ends. The couple in the video is speculated to have been together, but nothing is verified.

== Charts ==
=== Weekly charts ===
Chart (2007–2008)	Peak position
Canada Hot 100 (Billboard)	15
Canada AC (Billboard)	44
Canada CHR/Top 40 (Billboard)	20
Canada Hot AC (Billboard)	3
Canada Rock (Billboard)	5
US Alternative Airplay (Billboard)	30
US Mainstream Rock (Billboard)	40

=== Year-end charts ===
Chart (2008)	Position
Canada (Canadian Hot 100)	53
Canada Hot AC (Billboard)	16
