= Tip (album) =

Studio album by Finger Eleven
- Released: August 26, 1997
- Studios: Arnyard Studios, Toronto
- Genres: Hard rock; nu metal
- Length: 42:03
- Labels: Mercury; Wind-up (Note: 1998 re-release.)
- Producer: Arnold Lanni

Finger Eleven chronology
Letters from Chutney (1995)	Tip (1997)	The Greyest of Blue Skies (2000)

Singles from Tip
- 1. "Quicksand" Released: 1998

Tip is the second studio album by the Canadian rock band Finger Eleven, and the first under their new name, released in 1997. It departed from the funk-influenced sound of the 1995 album Letters from Chutney under the previous band name, Rainbow Butt Monkeys, in favor of a darker, heavier sound influenced by Tool. While responses to Tip were initially muted, compounded by Finger Eleven being dropped by their record label, the album was critically acclaimed and became a modest success with consumers upon its September 1998 re-release by Wind-up Records. Tip paved the way for Finger Eleven's mainstream breakthrough with The Greyest of Blue Skies in 2000. The album was certified Gold by Music Canada in 2014. It is the only Finger Eleven album to feature drummer Rob Gommerman as he departed the band shortly after the album's release.

== Background ==
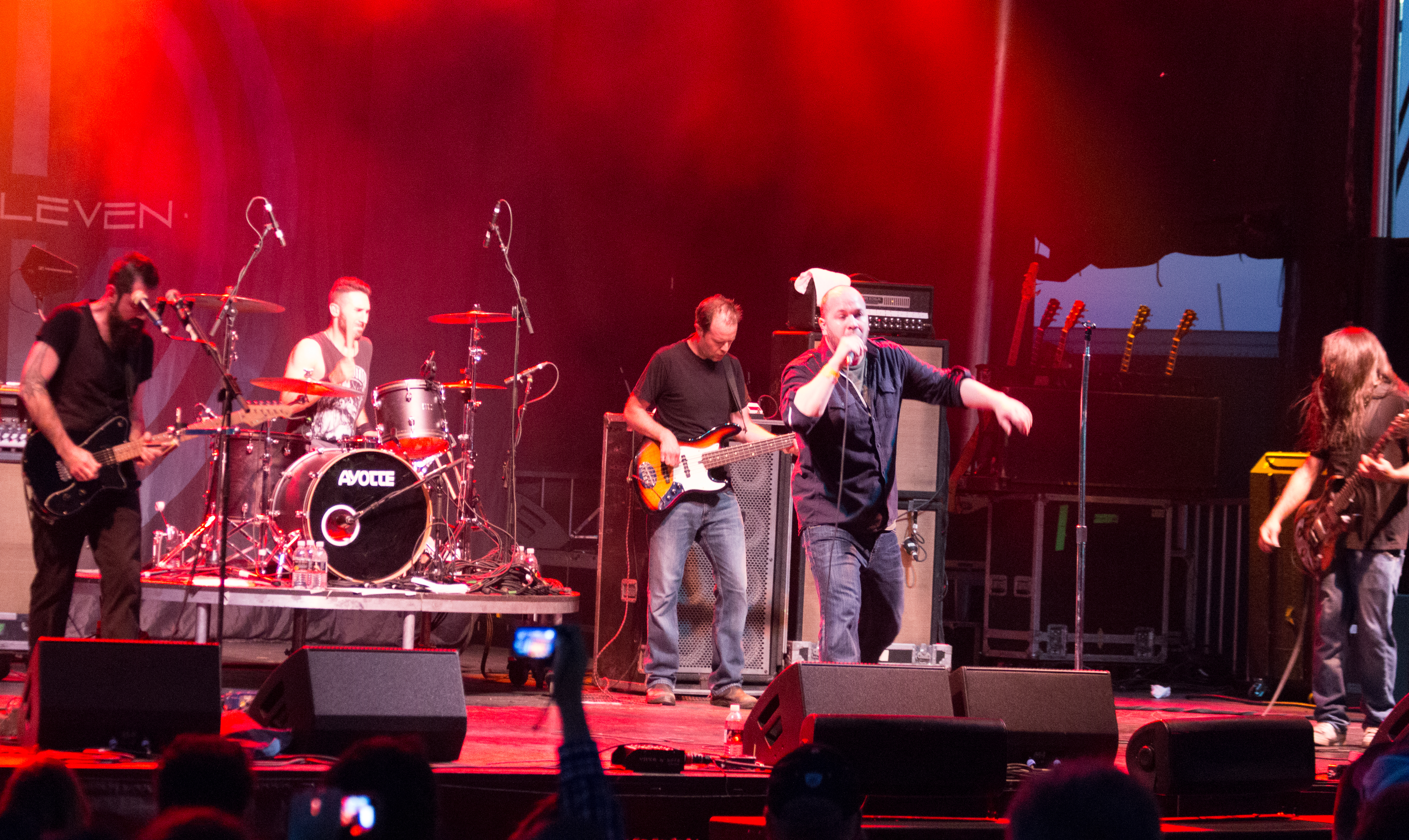
Finger Eleven performing in 2017.

Finger Eleven is a rock band from Burlington, Ontario that formed in 1989. The band's original lineup consisted of singer Scott Anderson, guitarists James Black and Rick Jackett, bassist Sean Anderson, and drummer Rob Gommerman. Having formed while the members were in high school, journalist Marie Gagne wrote that the band's funk-styled early work under the name Rainbow Butt Monkeys "showcased their infectious energy and youthful exuberance," and Scott Anderson asserted that there was "nothing professional" about the Rainbow Butt Monkeys era of the band. Finger Eleven recorded Letters from Chutney, their only album under the Rainbow Butt Monkeys moniker, after winning a Battle of the Bands contest hosted by CHTZ-FM.

The transformation of the Rainbow Butt Monkeys into Finger Eleven was a gradual process. In 1999, Black explained to Chart Attack interviewer James Hayashi-Tennant that "It was a gradual thing, but between Letters From Chutney and Tip, the public can only see these two things, and not see the in-between. It was a definite transition period. We didn't sit down and say, "let's try something new.'" After the Rainbow Butt Monkeys' style had noticeably shifted to a "heavier and angrier" tone, the band agreed that their name was inappropriate for a band that sought to be taken seriously.

The name "Finger Eleven" is taken from a demo version of "Thin Spirits," the seventh song on Tip. Explaining the backstory behind the band's name, Scott Anderson said, "When everything is pushing you in one direction and your instinct drives you in another – that’s finger eleven."

Tip was recorded in a cottage outside Toronto. When recording Tip, Rick Jackett tuned his guitar down a half-step.

== Music ==
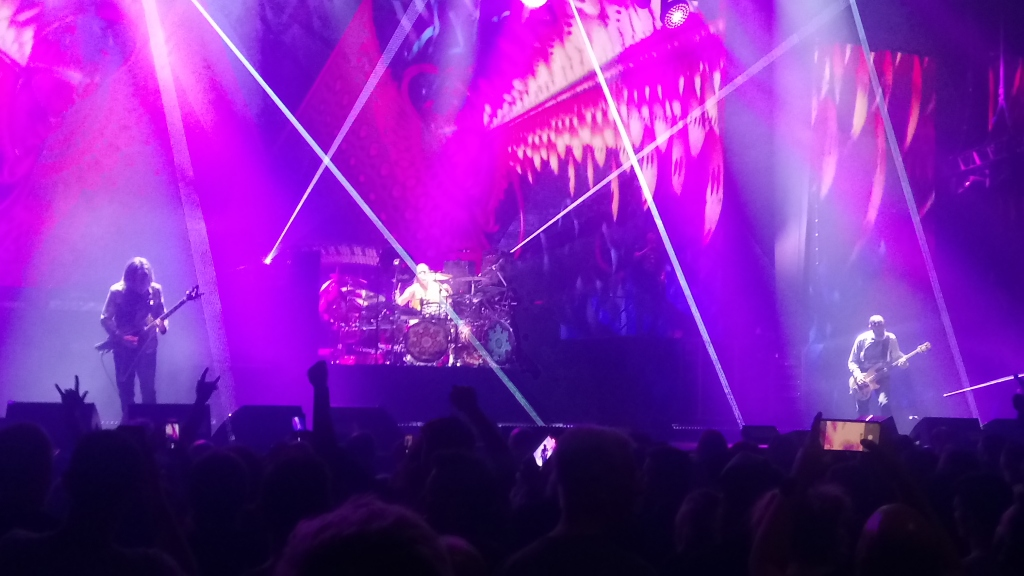
Tip's style is often compared to that of Tool (pictured).

"Above"
Music critic Alex Steiniger singled out "Above" as exemplifying Tip's aggression.

Tip marks a radical departure from the Rainbow Butt Monkeys era of the band, and the 1995 Letters from Chutney album. The overall style of the album is dark and heavy, exemplified by the "ass-kicking" tone of "Tip," "Above," and "Condenser." According to critics Roxanne Blanford and Alex Steininger, Tip extensively experiments with musical timing, tempo, and loud-quiet-loud dynamics, setting Finger Eleven apart from their peers such as Stone Temple Pilots and Our Lady Peace.

Tip is often compared to the work of Tool. Steininger described Finger Eleven's style on the album as "Tool-influenced power-rock/metal," and reviewer Lesa Pence highlighted the Tool influence on "Glimpse," Tip's eighth song. Hayashi-Tennant asserted that "a dark, Tool-ish vibe" underlies every song on Tip, and singled out "Thin Spirits" as exemplifying this characteristic.

== Release and reception ==
Tip was initially released on Mercury Records in 1997. This first release of the album was unsuccessful, and Mercury dropped Finger Eleven and ceased to promote their album six weeks after Tip debuted in stores. Even after losing Mercury as a label, the band attracted the attention of Wind-up Records, who signed the band on short notice and had them open for Fuel and Creed in 1998. On September 15, 1998, the date Finger Eleven's tour as an opener concluded, Wind-up re-released Tip, after which the album gained more attention.

Professional ratings
Review scores
Source	Rating
AllMusic	3.5/5 stars
In Music We Trust	B

After Tip's September 1998 re-release, the album gained critical acclaim, with emphasis on its darkness and angry tone. Blanford wrote that the songs "Above" and "Awake and Dreaming" possess "remarkable levels of emotion" and asserted that "This collection of powerful and deeply felt songs moves through rock soundscapes with impressive results." In a very favorable review, Pence wrote that she emotionally resonated with the songs on Tip, recommended the album to brokenhearted people, and said that her listening to the album for the first time "will remain an unforgettable experience." Hayashi-Tennant also wrote favorably about Tip, but disagreed with Pence's view that its full merit was clear upon first listen. He instead argued that Tip is "the kind of album that you first think is good, but it gets better each time, grows on you with each listen and gains a more permanent hold on you." Steininger was more critical and concluded that while the album contained "a good mix of lyrics and music," its consistent heaviness got repetitive, giving Tip a B.

Even prior to the Wind-up re-release, the Tip opener "Quicksand" was already being played on American stations KRXQ and WRCX. After the re-release, the "Quicksand" single emerged as Finger Eleven's breakthrough into the American market, reaching the #28 spot on Billboard's Mainstream Rock Tracks chart. The song gained further exposure in the United States after being featured in the American television program Roswell, though Finger Eleven was not credited. When Hayashi-Tennant commented to the band about American Finger Eleven fans leaving supportive comments on the band's website's guest book, Scott Anderson remarked, "Yeah, it's die-hard enthusiasm. Americans are like that."

By July 2000, shortly before the release of The Greyest of Blue Skies, Wind-up Records claimed that Tip had sold over 100,000 copies in Canada and the United States combined. On October 1, 2014, Music Canada awarded Tip with Gold certification, representing sales of 50,000 units in Canada.

== Track listing ==
=== Mercury release ===
All tracks are written by James Black, Scott Anderson, and Arnold Lanni, except where noted.

No.	Title	Writer(s)	Length
1.	"Quicksand"	Black; Scott Anderson; Lanni; Rob Gommerman	4:04
2.	"Tip"		3:39
3.	"Shudder"	Black; Scott Anderson; Lanni; Sean Anderson	3:24
4.	"Consolation Day"		4:00
5.	"Above"		3:43
6.	"Condenser"	Black; Scott Anderson; Lanni; Sean Anderson	3:07
7.	"Thin Spirits"		3:25
8.	"Glimpse"		3:30
9.	"Costume for a Gutterball"		4:38
10.	"Temporary Arms"		4:09
11.	"Swallowtail"		4:24
Total length:			42:03

=== Wind-up release ===
No.	Title	Writer(s)	Length
1.	"Quicksand"	Black; Scott Anderson; Lanni; Gommerman	4:04
2.	"Tip"		3:39
3.	"Shudder"	Black; Scott Anderson; Lanni; Sean Anderson	3:24
4.	"Awake and Dreaming"		3:35
5.	"Above"		3:43
6.	"Condenser"	Black; Scott Anderson; Lanni; Sean Anderson	3:07
7.	"Thin Spirits"		3:25
8.	"Glimpse"		3:30
9.	"Costume for a Gutterball"		4:38
10.	"Temporary Arms"		4:09
11.	"Swallowtail"		4:24
Total length:			41:38

== Personnel ==
Finger Eleven

- Scott Anderson – vocals
- James Black – guitar, vocals
- Rick Jackett – guitar
- Sean Anderson – bass
- Rob Gommerman – drums

Additional personnel

- Arnold Lanni – producer
- Angelo Caruso – engineer
- Howie Weinberg – mastering

== Certification ==
Region	Certification	Certified units/sales
Canada (Music Canada)	Gold	50,000^{^}
^{^} Shipments figures based on certification alone.
