= Life Turns Electric =

Studio album by Finger Eleven
- Released: October 5, 2010
- Recorded: January–June 2010
- Studio: Wind-up Studios (New York City)
- Genre: Alternative rock
- Length: 32:12
- Label: Wind-up
- Producer: James Black and Rick Jackett

Finger Eleven chronology
Them vs. You vs. Me (2007)	Life Turns Electric (2010)	Five Crooked Lines (2015)

Singles from Life Turns Electric
- 1. "Living in a Dream" Released: July 20, 2010; 2. "Whatever Doesn't Kill Me" Released: February 2, 2011; 3. "Stone Soul" Released: 2011; 4. "Pieces Fit" Released: 2011

Professional ratings
Review scores
Source	Rating
Allmusic	3.5/5 stars
Sputnikmusic	1.5/5 stars

Life Turns Electric is the sixth studio album by Canadian alternative rock band Finger Eleven. It was released by Wind-up Records on October 5, 2010 and was the last studio album to feature drummer Rich Beddoe. It was nominated for Rock Album of the Year at the 2011 Juno Awards. The track "Living in a Dream" was the official theme song for the 2011 WWE Royal Rumble.

== Track listing ==
All songs written by Finger Eleven; track 4 written by Finger Eleven and Gregg Wattenberg.

No.	Title	Length
1.	"Any Moment Now"	3:07
2.	"Pieces Fit"	3:09
3.	"Whatever Doesn't Kill Me"	3:37
4.	"Living in a Dream"	3:04
5.	"Good Intentions"	3:04
6.	"Stone Soul"	2:40
7.	"Ordinary Life"	4:00
8.	"Don't Look Down"	3:06
9.	"Famous Last Words"	3:19
10.	"Love's What You Left Me With"	3:22
Total length:		32:12

Bonus tracks
No.	Title	Length
11.	"Living in a Dream (Acoustic version)" (iTunes bonus track)	3:19
12.	"Stone Soul (Demo)" (Telus bonus track)	2:18

== Chart positions ==
Chart (2010)	Peak position
Canadian Albums Chart	15
US Billboard 200	92
US Top Alternative Albums (Billboard)	16
US Top Hard Rock Albums (Billboard)	11
US Top Rock Albums (Billboard)	31

== Personnel ==
=== Band ===
- Scott Anderson – vocals
- James Black – guitar, vocals
- Rick Jackett – guitar
- Sean Anderson – bass
- Rich Beddoe – drums

=== Production ===
- James Black – production, art direction
- Rick Jackett – production
- Ross Petersen – engineering, editing, production
- Chris Lord-Alge – mixing
- John Alicastro – assistant engineering
- Keith Armstrong – assistant engineering
- Nik Karpen – assistant engineering
- Brad Townsend – mixing
- Andrew Schubert – mixing
- Ryan Smith – mastering
- Gregg Wattenberg – production on "Living in a Dream"
- Rich Costey – mixing on "Living in a Dream"
- Charles L. Stavish Jr. – mixing on "Living in a Dream"
- Ted Jensen – mastering on "Living in a Dream"
- Mike Mongillo – concept art
- Michelle Lukianovich – concept art
