= Band Hero =

2009 video game

- Developer: Neversoft (Note: Ported to PlayStation 2 by Budcat Creations and to Nintendo DS and Wii by Vicarious Visions)
- Publisher: Activision
- Series: Hero
- Platforms: Nintendo DS, PlayStation 2, PlayStation 3, Wii, Xbox 360
- Release: NA: November 3, 2009; EU: November 6, 2009; AU: November 25, 2009
- Genre: Rhythm
- Modes: Single-player, multiplayer

Band Hero is a 2009 rhythm game developed by Neversoft and published by Activision. It is the second spin-off of the Guitar Hero series, following DJ Hero (2009). The game was released on November 3, 2009, for the PlayStation 2, PlayStation 3, Xbox 360, Wii and Nintendo DS consoles. The game is structurally similar to Guitar Hero 5 (2009), and supports full band play (lead and bass guitar, drums, and vocals) including the drop-in/drop-out and in-song instrument and difficulty change menus, and additional multiplayer modes as Guitar Hero 5. The console versions use instrument-shaped game controllers, while the DS version uses either the "Guitar Grip" introduced with the Guitar Hero: On Tour series or a new Drum Skin that comes with the game. Like previous games, who feature virtual avatars of musical artists, Taylor Swift, Adam Levine, and the band No Doubt are presented in the game.

Band Hero received mixed reviews from journalists. Some considered the game to be an appropriately flavored version of Guitar Hero 5 for the "Top 40" pop rock hits, while others felt the game was strictly aimed at teenagers or children. They also contested the cost of the full game, featuring only 65 songs compared with 85 songs in Guitar Hero 5, and considered if the content would have been better in downloadable form. A day after the game's release, the band No Doubt sued Activision, citing similar misuse of their avatars to the Kurt Cobain avatar in Guitar Hero 5.

== Gameplay ==
=== Main version ===
The game is functionally similar to the features of Guitar Hero 5, including bands composed of any combination of four instruments, drop-in/drop-out play, in-song menus to change difficulty and instrument, and additional multiplayer modes compared to Guitar Hero 5's "Rockfest". Band Hero also retains the Band Moment and the Band Revival feature from Guitar Hero 5. The PlayStation 2 version retains the same game engine from Guitar Hero: World Tour, which features the same HUD style as Guitar Hero: Metallica. Taylor Swift, Adam Levine (of Maroon 5), and the band No Doubt are playable avatars in the game. Artists performed motion capture for their in-game avatars.

Band Hero also introduced an updated revision of the drum kit that shipped with Guitar Hero World Tour. Many changes were made to address weight and size concerns that made assembly difficult, and the stand's crossbar was moved to the bottom to improve leg room and allow the bass pedal to be supported by it. The cymbals were changed to a circular shape from the previous triangular design, and the sensitivity of the drums themselves were adjusted. An in-game sensitivity adjustment feature is also supported. In the United States, the new controller was, for a limited time, exclusive to the game and instrument bundles of Band Hero on Wii. The Xbox 360 and PlayStation 3 versions of the controller were released at a later date; Band Hero bundles for these platforms in the U.S. included the World Tour drum controller.

=== DS version ===
The "drum skin" for the Nintendo DS Lite is used to allow Band Hero players to simulate the console-based version of drumming.

Band Hero for the Nintendo DS features the ability to play the same instruments as the console-based versions. Though the game is compatible with the DS, DS Lite, DSi (vocals only), and 3DS (vocals only), only players on the DS Lite will receive the "full band" experience due to the nature of the hardware extensions for the unit.

Guitar and bass parts are played with the same "Guitar Grip" previously created for the Guitar Hero: On Tour series, though this unit will not work on the Nintendo DSi and Nintendo 3DS due to lack of a GBA slot. The gameplay for guitar and bass is considered to be the fourth iteration of the Guitar Hero On Tour design by developers Vicarious Visions, and have further improvements to meet with different strumming styles.

A new "drum skin" that fits over the bottom half of the DS unit provides four "pads" for drumming that map to the unit's directional pad and face buttons; this design was selected over use of the touch screen due to the inability of the touch screen to recognize near-simultaneous taps, a factor that would have interfered with the drumming experience. The drum skin is limited to the Nintendo DS Lite due to the skin's form factor. The decision to design towards the DS Lite rather than the newer DSi was due to the much larger volume of DS Lite units that had been sold relative to the DSi.

The DS microphone is used for vocal parts. The DS has 30 of the songs from console versions. The game also supports up to four player multiplayer in a similar manner as Guitar Hero 5 using the DS's local wireless connections, allowing any combination of instruments.

== Development ==
A television advertisement, featuring Taylor Swift, Pete Wentz (Fall Out Boy), Travis Barker (Blink-182), and Rivers Cuomo (Weezer), was created for the game by director Brett Ratner in the same manner as previous ads for other recent Guitar Hero games, initially paying tribute to the scene in Risky Business with Tom Cruise dancing in his underwear to the song "Old Time Rock and Roll". Though it appears as if all four performed together, Wentz stated that Swift performed her parts separately using a green screen to impose her into the footage of the other musicians.

A three-song demo was made available on Xbox Live on October 15, 2009, and included "Paralyzer" by Finger Eleven, "Picture to Burn" by Taylor Swift and "Walking on Sunshine" by Katrina and the Waves. The demo was solely the Party Mode, with the three songs playable in random order.

== Soundtrack ==
=== Console soundtrack ===
Band Hero for consoles features 65 songs from "mainstream acts". The game also allowed Guitar Hero World Tour’s downloadable content to be used within Band Hero, as well as Guitar Hero 5. In addition, some on-disc songs from Guitar Hero World Tour and Guitar Hero Smash Hits were importable into Band Hero, with music licensing limiting those that can be transferred, prior to the 2014 shutdown of DLC and exports. Furthermore, 69 of the 85 on-disc songs from Guitar Hero 5 can be imported into Band Hero; similarly, 61 of the 65 songs from Band Hero can be exported for use in Guitar Hero 5 and Guitar Hero: Warriors of Rock. All DLC works with Band Hero, along with all earlier on-disc songs marked as exportable, unlike Lego Rock Band which only allows DLC and exports marked as "family friendly".

| Year | Song Title | Artist | Venue | Genre | Order | Exportable |
|---|---|---|---|---|---|---|
| 2005 | "A Million Ways" | OK Go | 01. Mall Of Fame Tour | Pop Rock | 4 | Yes |
| 1970 | "ABC" | The Jackson 5 | 02. Smoke & Water Festival | R & B | 14 | Yes |
| 1971 | "American Pie" | Don McLean | 11. Hyperspace | Classic Rock | 65 | Yes |
| 1996 | "Angels of the Silences" | Counting Crows | 07. Everpop Awards | Pop Rock | 43 | Yes |
| 2009 | "Back Again" | Parachute | 09. Paris | Pop Rock | 58 | Yes |
| 1981 | "Bad Reputation" | Joan Jett | 03. Club La Noza | Rock | 21 | Yes |
| 2004 | "Beautiful Soul" | Jesse McCartney | 07. Everpop Awards | Pop | 44 | No |
| 2007 | "Believe" | The Bravery | 02. Smoke & Water Festival | Rock | 9 | Yes |
| 1989 | "Black Cat" | Janet Jackson | 05. Harajuku | Rock | 34 | Yes |
| 2005 | "Black Horse and the Cherry Tree" | KT Tunstall | 09. Paris | Rock | 56 | Yes |
| 2003 | "Bring Me to Life" | Evanescence | 01. Mall Of Fame Tour | Industrial | 5 | Yes |
| 2005 | "Dirty Little Secret" | The All-American Rejects | 03. Club La Noza | Pop Punk | 15 | Yes |
| 1982 | "Do You Really Want to Hurt Me" | Culture Club | 01. Mall Of Fame Tour | New Wave | 2 | Yes |
| 1995 | "Don't Speak" | No Doubt | 07. Everpop Awards | Pop Rock | 47 | Yes |
| 1988 | "Every Rose Has Its Thorn" | Poison | 05. Harajuku | Rock | 29 | Yes |
| 2008 | "Fascination" | Alphabeat | 07. Everpop Awards | Pop | 45 | Yes |
| 2008 | "Gasoline" | The Airborne Toxic Event | 10. Amp Orbiter | Rock | 61 | Yes |
| 2003 | "Hands Down" | Dashboard Confessional | 08. Red River Canyon | Pop Rock | 50 | Yes |
| 2007 | "Hang Me Up to Dry" | Cold War Kids | 01. Mall Of Fame Tour | Modern Rock | 1 | Yes |
| 1967 | "Happy Together" | The Turtles | 01. Mall Of Fame Tour | Rock | 3 | Yes |
| 1969 | "Honky Tonk Women" | The Rolling Stones | 04. Summer Park Festival | Southern Rock | 27 | Yes |
| 1968 | "I Heard It Through the Grapevine" | Marvin Gaye | 02. Smoke & Water Festival | R & B | 13 | Yes |
| 1979 | "I Want You to Want Me" (Live) | Cheap Trick | 06. La Luz De Madrid | Rock | 40 | Yes |
| 1996 | "If You Could Only See" | Tonic | 03. Club La Noza | Pop Rock | 18 | Yes |
| 1983 | "In a Big Country" | Big Country | 06. La Luz De Madrid | Rock | 38 | Yes |
| 1995 | "Just a Girl" | No Doubt | 09. Paris | Pop Rock | 59 | Yes |
| 2000 | "Kids" | Robbie Williams and Kylie Minogue | 09. Paris | Dance | 57 | Yes |
| 1974 | "Kung Fu Fighting" | Carl Douglas | 08. Red River Canyon | Disco | 51 | Yes |
| 2008 | "L.E.S. Artistes" | Santigold | 03. Club La Noza | Pop Rock | 16 | Yes |
| 1983 | "Let's Dance" | David Bowie | 01. Mall Of Fame Tour | Pop Rock | 6 | Yes |
| 2009 | "Lifeline" | Papa Roach | 09. Paris | Pop Rock | 60 | Yes |
| 2007 | "Like Whoa" | Aly & AJ | 08. Red River Canyon | Pop | 52 | No |
| 2005 | "Lips of an Angel" | Hinder | 02. Smoke & Water Festival | Pop Rock | 10 | Yes |
| 1983 | "Love Is a Battlefield" | Pat Benatar | 05. Harajuku | Pop | 31 | Yes |
| 2008 | "Love Story" (Pop Mix) | Taylor Swift | 04. Summer Park Festival | Pop | 26 | Yes |
| 1983 | "Mr. Roboto" | Styx | 04. Summer Park Festival | Prog Rock | 28 | No |
| 2006 | "Naïve" | The Kooks | 10. Amp Orbiter | Pop Rock | 62 | Yes |
| 2003 | "Ocean Avenue" | Yellowcard | 05. Harajuku | Pop Punk | 30 | Yes |
| 1964 | "Oh, Pretty Woman" | Roy Orbison | 01. Mall Of Fame Tour | Rock | 7 | Yes |
| 1981 | "Our Lips Are Sealed" | The Go-Go's | 02. Smoke & Water Festival | Pop | 12 | Yes |
| 2007 | "Paralyzer" | Finger Eleven | 06. La Luz De Madrid | Hard Rock | 39 | Yes |
| 2006 | "Picture to Burn" | Taylor Swift | 08. Red River Canyon | Country | 53 | Yes |
| 2007 | "Pictures of You" | The Last Goodnight | 04. Summer Park Festival | Pop Rock | 23 | Yes |
| 2006 | "Put Your Records On" | Corinne Bailey Rae | 05. Harajuku | R & B | 32 | Yes |
| 1982 | "Rio" | Duran Duran | 08. Red River Canyon | Pop Rock | 55 | Yes |
| 2002 | "Rock Star" | N.E.R.D. | 02. Smoke & Water Festival | Hip Hop | 11 | Yes |
| 1995 | "Santa Monica" | Everclear | 03. Club La Noza | Pop Rock | 19 | Yes |
| 2004 | "She Will Be Loved" | Maroon 5 | 05. Harajuku | Pop Rock | 33 | Yes |
| 2003 | "So Yesterday" | Hilary Duff | 02. Smoke & Water Festival | Pop | 8 | No |
| 1999 | "Steal My Kisses" | Ben Harper and the Innocent Criminals | 04. Summer Park Festival | Alternative | 25 | Yes |
| 2005 | "Sugar, We're Goin Down" | Fall Out Boy | 05. Harajuku | Pop Punk | 35 | Yes |
| 1999 | "Take a Picture" | Filter | 07. Everpop Awards | Rock | 46 | Yes |
| 2008 | "Take Back the City" | Snow Patrol | 04. Summer Park Festival | Rock | 24 | Yes |
| 2006 | "Take What You Take" | Lily Allen | 03. Club La Noza | Pop Rock | 20 | Yes |
| 2006 | "The Adventure" | Angels & Airwaves | 06. La Luz De Madrid | Rock | 42 | Yes |
| 1997 | "The Impression That I Get" | The Mighty Mighty Bosstones | 10. Amp Orbiter | Ska Punk | 64 | Yes |
| 2000 | "Turn Off the Light" | Nelly Furtado | 07. Everpop Awards | Pop | 48 | Yes |
| 1985 | "Walking on Sunshine" | Katrina and the Waves | 06. La Luz De Madrid | Pop Rock | 41 | Yes |
| 1996 | "Wannabe" | Spice Girls | 03. Club La Noza | Pop | 17 | Yes |
| 2008 | "Warwick Avenue" | Duffy | 06. La Luz De Madrid | Pop | 37 | Yes |
| 2002 | "When I'm Gone" | 3 Doors Down | 06. La Luz De Madrid | Rock | 36 | Yes |
| 1980 | "Whip It" | Devo | 04. Summer Park Festival | New Wave | 22 | Yes |
| 1978 | "Y.M.C.A." | Village People | 07. Everpop Awards | Disco | 49 | Yes |
| 2008 | "You Belong with Me" | Taylor Swift | 08. Red River Canyon | Country | 54 | Yes |
| 2004 | "You Had Me" | Joss Stone | 10. Amp Orbiter | Funk | 63 | Yes |

=== Nintendo DS soundtrack ===
The Nintendo DS version of Band Hero features thirty songs (per regional version from a forty-five song combined setlist) of the same genre as the console-based soundtrack. Although they feature some of the same artists from the console version, the tracks themselves are mainly different, with a limited overlap of three songs being part of the main setlists of both versions, seven available as downloadable content, and six exportable from their use in prior console games.

| Song Title | Artist | North American version | European version | Console version availability | Mainline game(s) featured |
|---|---|---|---|---|---|
| "All You Need" | Sublime | Yes | No | No | —N/a |
| "A-Punk" | Vampire Weekend | Yes | No | Exportable | Guitar Hero 5 |
| "Believe" | The All-American Rejects | Yes | No | No | —N/a |
| "Boots of Chinese Plastic" | The Pretenders | Yes | No | No | —N/a |
| "Call Me When You're Sober" | Evanescence | Yes | Yes | No | —N/a |
| "Club Foot" | Kasabian | No | Yes | No | Guitar Hero Live |
| "Crazy Little Thing Called Love" | Queen | Yes | No | Downloadable | Guitar Hero 5 (DLC) |
| "Everything About You" | Ugly Kid Joe | Yes | Yes | No | —N/a |
| "Excuse Me Mr." | No Doubt | Yes | Yes | No | Guitar Hero III: Legends of Rock (DLC) |
| "Fascination" | Alphabeat | No | Yes | Yes | Band Hero |
| "Feel Good Inc." | Gorillaz | No | Yes | No | Guitar Hero 5 |
| "First Date" | Blink-182 | Yes | Yes | Downloadable | Guitar Hero 5 (DLC); Guitar Hero: Van Halen |
| "Fly Away" | Lenny Kravitz | No | Yes | Downloadable | Guitar Hero 5 (DLC) |
| "Get Free" | The Vines | Yes | No | No | Guitar Hero: Warriors of Rock |
| "Girlfriend" | Avril Lavigne | Yes | Yes | No | —N/a |
| "Golden Touch" | Razorlight | No | Yes | No | —N/a |
| "Grace Kelly" | Mika | No | Yes | No | —N/a |
| "Hungry Like the Wolf" | Duran Duran | Yes | No | Exportable | Guitar Hero 5 |
| "I Predict a Riot" | Kaiser Chiefs | Yes | Yes | No | —N/a |
| "In Too Deep" | Sum 41 | Yes | No | Downloadable | Guitar Hero 5 (DLC) |
| "Let's Get It Started" | The Black Eyed Peas | Yes | Yes | No | —N/a |
| "Lump" | The Presidents of the United States of America | Yes | No | No | —N/a |
| "Manhattan" | Kings of Leon | Yes | Yes | No | —N/a |
| "Monkey Wrench" | Foo Fighters | Yes | Yes | Exportable | Guitar Hero II; Guitar Hero: Smash Hits |
| "Munich" | Editors | No | Yes | Downloadable | Guitar Hero 5 (DLC) |
| "My Favourite Game" | The Cardigans | No | Yes | No | —N/a |
| "No One Knows" | Queens of the Stone Age | Yes | Yes | Exportable | Guitar Hero; Guitar Hero: Smash Hits |
| "Our Truth" | Lacuna Coil | Yes | No | Exportable | Guitar Hero World Tour |
| "She Will Be Loved" | Maroon 5 | No | Yes | Yes | Band Hero |
| "So What" | Pink | Yes | Yes | Downloadable | Guitar Hero World Tour (DLC) |
| "Song 2" | Blur | No | Yes | No | Guitar Hero 5 |
| "Spaceman" | The Killers | Yes | Yes | No | —N/a |
| "Suddenly I See" | KT Tunstall | Yes | Yes | No | —N/a |
| "Take What You Take" | Lily Allen | No | Yes | Yes | Band Hero |
| "The Age of the Understatement" | The Last Shadow Puppets | No | Yes | No | —N/a |
| "The Great Escape" | Boys Like Girls | Yes | No | No | —N/a |
| "Thnks fr th Mmrs" | Fall Out Boy | Yes | Yes | Downloadable | Guitar Hero 5 (DLC) |
| "Tripping" | Robbie Williams | No | Yes | No | —N/a |
| "Troublemaker" | Weezer | Yes | No | No | —N/a |
| "Two Princes" | Spin Doctors | Yes | No | No | —N/a |
| "Under My Thumb" (Live) | The Rolling Stones | Yes | Yes | Downloadable | Guitar Hero 5 (DLC) |
| "Wannabe in L.A." | Eagles of Death Metal | Yes | No | Exportable | Guitar Hero 5 |
| "Windows" | N.E.R.D | No | Yes | No | —N/a |
| "Yellow" | Coldplay | No | Yes | No | Guitar Hero III: Legends of Rock (DLC) |
| "You Better Pray" | The Red Jumpsuit Apparatus | Yes | No | No | —N/a |

=== Importable content ===
On release of Band Hero, 35 of the songs from World Tour and 21 from Smash Hits are importable into Band Hero for a small fee (approximately $0.10 per song), and are treated as downloadable content for the game playable in all game modes. Furthermore, 69 of the 85 tracks from Guitar Hero 5 will be importable into Band Hero. All transferred songs will also be playable in Guitar Hero 5 and will be free if downloaded in either games. However, Guitar Hero 5 or Band Hero is not backwards-compatible with World Tour nor any other Guitar Hero game. The transfer process requires the player to enter a unique code from the World Tour or Smash Hits manual to be able to redownload available songs in a pack (on the Xbox 360 or PlayStation 3) or individual songs (on the Wii) that have been updated to include the new features. Players on the Xbox 360 can delete individual songs after downloading the pack. Some songs are not transferable because of licensing issues—not technical issues—according to Bright. Tim Riley, the head of music licensing at Activision, stated that the company will continue to seek licenses for more songs from previous games and downloadable content to be exported into Band Hero, but cannot guarantee that these songs will be licensed for future Guitar Hero games.

=== Downloadable content ===
While Band Hero does not have its own separate library of downloadable content, it supports downloadable content from the Guitar Hero 5 DLC library. However, as of March 31, 2014 the downloadable content has been removed by Activision with no evidence it will be made available again.

In addition, 152 of the 158 available downloadable songs for Guitar Hero World Tour are forward-compatible with Guitar Hero 5 and Band Hero; the existing content is automatically upgraded to include all features new to these games and was immediately available to players upon release of Band Hero. Downloaded songs can be used in all game modes, provided all participating players have the song, including in the game's Career mode when players are given the option to select any song to play. The entire Band Hero DLC library is also available in Guitar Hero 5, and vice versa, so both games embrace the same DLC library.

Nine of the DLC songs released had specific focus on Band Hero and are listed below.

| Year | Song title | Artist | Pack name | Genre | Release date |
|---|---|---|---|---|---|
| 2006 | "Our Song" | Taylor Swift | Celebrity New Years Rock Track Pack | Country | December 22, 2009 |
| 2002 | "Harder to Breathe" | Maroon 5 | Celebrity New Years Rock Track Pack | Pop Rock | December 22, 2009 |
| 2000 | "New" | No Doubt | Celebrity New Years Rock Track Pack | Pop Rock | December 22, 2009 |
| 2008 | "7 Things" | Miley Cyrus | Band Hero 1 Track Pack | Pop | May 18, 2010 |
| 2009 | "Here We Go Again" | Demi Lovato | Band Hero 1 Track Pack | Pop | May 18, 2010 |
| 2009 | "Falling Down" | Selena Gomez & the Scene | Band Hero 1 Track Pack | Pop | May 18, 2010 |
| 2009 | "Fireflies" | Owl City | Pop 1 Track Pack | Electronic | June 29, 2010 |
| 2008 | "Just Dance" | Lady Gaga (Feat. Colby O'Donis) | Pop 1 Track Pack | Dance | June 29, 2010 |
| 2002 | "This Love" | Maroon 5 | Pop 1 Track Pack | Pop Rock | June 29, 2010 |

== Reception ==
Reception

Aggregate scores
| Aggregator | Score |
|---|---|
| GameRankings | 81% |
| Metacritic | 76/100 |

Review scores
| Publication | Score |
|---|---|
| 1Up.com | A− |
| Game Informer | 7.8/10 |
| GameSpot | 8.0/10 |
| GameSpy | 4.5/5 |
| Giant Bomb | 3/5 |
| IGN | 7.9/10 |

Band Hero has received mixed to positive reviews from gaming critics. Most recognized the game as having the same feature sets as Guitar Hero 5, including any benefits or flaws that may come from that. Reviewers praised the reuse of the Guitar Hero 5 features such as the Party Play mode that allows for players to jump in and out, the improved Career mode, and the improved GHTunes. Some identified that the target market of the game appears to be towards teenage girls, such as the featuring of Taylor Swift, the color schemes used in the game, and other parts of the song selection. Reviewers noted that setlist would be the strongest measure of whether players should purchase the game. The reviewers also commented on the smaller setlist, which contains only 65 songs compared to Guitar Hero 5's 85.

Review did note that the "Top 40" songs do not always make for challenging songs, as many featured simple chord repetition throughout the song or simply following pre-programmed electronic keyboard or drum beats. However, most songs were found to feature at least one difficult instrument portion that would be fun to play. Reviews also noted that the censoring of songs in order to affirm a family-friendly rating is awkward, such as censoring the word "whiskey" from Don McLean's "American Pie" (8 times), and can ruin the enjoyment of some songs. Greg Miller of IGN further noted that these censoring are at odds with the straight-up inclusion of other songs such as "Gasoline" by The Airborne Toxic Event which, Miller claims, is about sex.

Some reviews saw Band Hero as a good addition to the Guitar Hero franchise, and pointed out the strength of the game is improved in part due to the ability to import and export songs between Band Hero, Guitar Hero 5, and content. Justin Haywald of 1UP.com, in consideration of the equivalent nature of featured, considered that players now had a choice of "'Top 40' Band Hero or 'Hard Rock' [Guitar Hero 5]" skins to select for playing the music on, and positive direction for the series. However, others saw the simple rebranding of the game, and that some may see the product as little more than a "full-price track pack".

The game has sold 596,000 units in North America through January 2010, according to data from NPD Group. Prior to the end of 2009, Activision had expressed plans to publish a sequel to Band Hero in 2010. However, as a result of overall decline in music game sales, in part due to the large number of SKUs released by Activision during 2009, such plans have been shelved and Activision only released sequels to Guitar Hero and DJ Hero in 2010.

=== Lawsuit by No Doubt ===
A day following Band Hero's release, the band No Doubt filed a lawsuit against Activision. In a similar manner as Guitar Hero 5, where the avatar of Kurt Cobain could be used to play any of the songs in the game and leading to questionable virtual performances, the same was found to be true for the No Doubt avatars in Band Hero. No Doubt's lawsuit claimed their contract limited their performance to the three songs within the game and that they were never told their avatars would be used in that manner. Activision argued that it believes that the manner of use of the band's avatars in the game is within the bounds of the contract. Activision subsequently filed a counter-suit against the band, alleging contract breaches; Activision claimed that it was "publicly known" that in-game characters in the Guitar Hero series, once unlocked, could be used for all game modes, and that No Doubt's request came well after the game's code was finalized. Courtney Love, who has expressed an intention to file legal action for Cobain's appearance in Guitar Hero 5, said to NME that she will join No Doubt in their lawsuit against Activision.

In April 2010, the Los Angeles County Superior Court denied Activision's motion to dismiss No Doubt's rights of publicity claims under California's anti-SLAPP law. In February 2011, the 2nd District Court of Appeal upheld the Superior Court's ruling, allowing No Doubt's case to proceed against Activision. In May 2012, the Superior Court denied Activision's motion for summary judgment, though it also denied a preliminary injunction sought by the band. In October 2012, on the eve of trial, the case was settled for undisclosed terms.
