= Finger Eleven (album) =

Studio album by Finger Eleven
- Released: June 17, 2003
- Recorded: 2002–2003
- Studios: Groovemaster Studios (Chicago, Illinois); The Village Recorder Studios (West Los Angeles, California)
- Genres: Post-grunge; hard rock; alternative metal
- Length: 46:25
- Label: Wind-up
- Producer: Johnny K

Finger Eleven chronology
| The Greyest of Blue Skies (2000) | Finger Eleven (2003) | Them vs. You vs. Me (2007) |

Singles from Finger Eleven
- 1. "Good Times" Released: April 29, 2003; 2. "One Thing" Released: September 9, 2003; 3. "Absent Elements" Released: March 2004; 4. "Stay in Shadow" Released: May 25, 2004; 5. "Thousand Mile Wish" Released: December 7, 2004

Professional ratings
Review scores
| Source | Rating |
|---|---|
| AllMusic | 3/5 stars |

Finger Eleven is the fourth studio album by the Canadian rock band Finger Eleven. It ranges in style from grunge and prog-rock to disco metal. Thanks to the album's commercial success, the band was included in the 2004 SnoCore Tour. "One Thing" became the biggest single from the record, reaching no. 16 on the US Billboard Hot 100. It was also played consistently on rock radio and MTV.

== Commercial performance ==
Finger Eleven debuted at no. 4 on the Canadian Albums Chart, the band's highest position on that chart to date. The album sold 8,300 copies in Canada in its first week. Finger Eleven was also the band's most successful album in the United States, reaching no. 1 on the Top Heatseekers chart and appearing on the Billboard 200, peaking at no. 96 in 2004. The album was certified platinum in Canada and gold in the United States, making it the band's first to receive a certification in the U.S.

== Track listing ==
All lyrics are written by Scott Anderson; all music is composed by Finger Eleven, except where noted.

| No. | Title | Music | Length |
|---|---|---|---|
| 1. | "Other Light" | | 2:51 |
| 2. | "Complicated Questions" | | 3:16 |
| 3. | "Stay in Shadow" | Scott Anderson, James Black | 3:15 |
| 4. | "Good Times" | | 3:55 |
| 5. | "Absent Elements" | | 4:00 |
| 6. | "Thousand Mile Wish" | | 4:59 |
| 7. | "Conversations" | | 3:34 |
| 8. | "The Last Scene of Struggling" | | 3:15 |
| 9. | "Panic Attack" | | 3:32 |
| 10. | "Therapy" | | 4:49 |
| 11. | "One Thing" | Anderson, Black | 4:39 |
| 12. | "Obvious Heart" | | 4:20 |
| Total length: | | | 46:25 |

=== B-sides ===
1. "Unspoken" – 3:37
2. "Wake Up Demons" – 2:16
3. "Murder My Mind's Eye" – 4:18
4. "Tearing Disguises" – 6:17
5. "Sad Exchange" (from Daredevil: The Album) — 3:32

== Personnel ==
- Scott Anderson – vocals
- James Black – guitar, vocals
- Rick Jackett – guitar
- Sean Anderson – bass
- Rich Beddoe – drums
- James Wilson – didgeridoo (on "Stay in Shadow")

== Chart positions ==
=== Weekly charts ===
Weekly chart performance for Finger Eleven
| Chart (2003–2004) | Peak position |
|---|---|
| Canadian Albums (Billboard) | 4 |
| US Billboard 200 | 96 |
| US Heatseekers Albums (Billboard) | 1 |

=== Year-end charts ===
Year-end chart performance for Finger Eleven
| Chart (2004) | Position |
|---|---|
| US Billboard 200 | 189 |

== Certifications ==
Certifications for Finger Eleven
| Region | Certification | Certified units/sales |
|---|---|---|
| Canada (Music Canada) | Platinum | 100,000^{^} |
| United States (RIAA) | Gold | 500,000^{^} |
^{^} Shipments figures based on certification alone.
