= The Greyest of Blue Skies =

Studio album by Finger Eleven
- Released: July 25, 2000
- Recorded: 1999–2000
- Studios: Arnyard Studios, Toronto
- Genres: Post-grunge; nu metal
- Length: 41:10
- Label: Wind-up
- Producer: Arnold Lanni

Finger Eleven chronology
Tip (1997)	The Greyest of Blue Skies (2000)	Finger Eleven (2003)

Singles from The Greyest of Blue Skies
- 1. "First Time" Released: July 2000; 2. "Drag You Down" Released: October 2000; 3. "Bones + Joints" Released: March 2001

Professional ratings
Review scores
Source	Rating
AllMusic	4/5 stars

The Greyest of Blue Skies is the third studio album from the Canadian rock band Finger Eleven, released in 2000. It is Finger Eleven's first album with drummer Rich Beddoe, who replaced original drummer Rob Gommerman. The track "Suffocate" appeared on the film Scream 3 and also in the soundtrack. The tracks "First Time" and "Drag You Down" each appeared in the Dragon Ball Z feature film Lord Slug, while the song "Stay and Drown" was in the Dragon Ball Z feature film Cooler's Revenge. A contestant from Idol 2006 sang "Sick of It All". The album was certified Gold in Canada in June 2001.

== Track listing ==
All songs written by Scott Anderson, James Black and Arnold Lanni, except for where noted.

No.	Title	Writer(s)	Length
1.	"First Time"	Anderson, Black, Lanni, Rick Jackett	4:26
2.	"Drag You Down"		3:21
3.	"My Carousel"		3:43
4.	"Sick of It All"		3:18
5.	"For the Ocean"		2:56
6.	"Broken Words"		3:27
7.	"Suffocate"		3:44
8.	"Bones + Joints"	Black, Lanni	3:47
9.	"Famous"		4:08
10.	"Walking in My Shoes" (Depeche Mode cover)	Martin Gore	3:52
11.	"Stay and Drown"	Anderson, Black, Lanni, Sean Anderson	4:23

== Personnel ==
Adapted credits from the booklet.

Finger Eleven

- Scott Anderson – vocals
- James Black – guitar, vocals
- Rick Jackett – guitar
- Sean Anderson – bass
- Rich Beddoe – drums

Production

- Arnold Lanni – producer, mixer
- Chris Gauthier – digital editing
- Rich Chychi – digital editing
- Ted Jensen – mastering

Design

- Jeff Faerber – artwork
- James Black – art concept

== Chart positions ==
Chart (2000)	Peak position
Canadian Albums Chart	17
Canadian Albums (Billboard)	18

== Certifications ==
Region	Certification	Certified units/sales
Canada (Music Canada)	Gold	50,000^{^}
^{^} Shipments figures based on certification alone.
