= Paralyzer =

Single by Finger Eleven

from the album Them vs. You vs. Me
- Released: March 1, 2007
- Recorded: 2006
- Studio: Groovemaster (Chicago); Metalworks (Mississauga)
- Genre: Funk rock; dance-rock; alternative rock; hard rock; post-grunge
- Length: 3:28
- Label: Wind-up
- Songwriters: Scott Anderson; Sean Anderson; Rich Beddoe; James Black; Rick Jackett
- Producer: Johnny K

Finger Eleven singles chronology
"Thousand Mile Wish" (2004)	"Paralyzer" (2007)	"Falling On" (2007)

Music video
- "Paralyzer" on YouTube

"Paralyzer" is a song by the Canadian rock band Finger Eleven. It was released as the lead single from their fourth studio album, Them vs. You vs. Me, on March 1, 2007. The song's release as a single preceded the release of Them vs. You vs. Me by five days. The song received high airplay in both the United States and Canada, and was performed live on the March 14, 2007 episode of The Tonight Show with Jay Leno and again ten months later on January 9, 2008. The song has surpassed "One Thing" to be Finger Eleven's most successful single.

In 2024, the staff of Consequence included the song in their list of "50 Kick-Butt Post-Grunge Songs We Can Get Behind".

== Composition ==
Finger Eleven's frontman Scott Anderson has said that the single has a feel distinct from the rest of Finger Eleven's music, possessing more of a funk rock or dance-rock sound. However, the song has also been characterized as alternative rock, hard rock, and post-grunge. The style of the song has been compared to (though inspired by) "Take Me Out", a 2004 single by indie rock band Franz Ferdinand. Finger Eleven occasionally performed "Take Me Out" during the middle of Paralyzer in live performances as a part of a medley along with "Trampled Under Foot" by Led Zeppelin and "Another Brick in the Wall (Part II)" by Pink Floyd. "Paralyzer" is about feeling uncomfortable in a dance club. Drummer Rich Beddoe said "It's something the whole band feels". He added,

You're always the guy in the corner that feels awkward and just drinks too much and then says something stupid and goes home lonely. (laughs) We were all coming from that place, so when he [singer Scott Anderson] wrote that song, it was like, 'Oh, man. It's so cool that finally that's being said.' ... I don't know if he had a particular experience about that or just it's every fucking time you go to a bar that's what happens. Obviously there is a big difference between like a pub and a club. We belong in a dirty little bar in the corner drinking. That's our place – where we feel comfortable. A bunch of laser lights and girls dancing to Lil' Wayne – we're screwed.

The single has three versions; one is the original CD version, while the other two are radio edit versions, in which the line containing the word "shitty" is either censored or replaced with "shady". The song alludes to the band's prior hit "One Thing" with the lyric "I should just stay home, if one thing really means one".

== Music video ==
The video was released on YouTube. It starts with a man, walking, who begins to intersperse his steps with dance moves. He looks into windows and in the reflection, he sees himself with dancers around him, but when he turns he sees a woman. The two begin to dance with the symbolic dancers returning in greater numbers every time the chorus repeats. The video alternates between shots of the band playing on a rooftop that overlooks the dancers in a seemingly abandoned street.

The video reached number eight on VH1's weekly VSpot Top 20 Countdown. On the channel's year-end Top 40 Videos of 2007, it placed at number 23, despite only having spent (at the time) one week on its weekly Top 20 Countdown.

== Chart performance ==
"Paralyzer" debuted on the U.S. Billboard Hot 100 at number 97 in June 2007. It proceeded to slowly gain in airplay and digital sales over the months. For the chart week of November 24, 2007 (over six months after the song was released), it became the band's first-career top 10 hit on the Billboard Hot 100, rising from number 14 to number 10. The song then rose to peak at number six on the Hot 100 over a month later, for the chart week of January 5, 2008. The song became the band's first number one on the Mainstream Rock and Alternative charts. It also became their second top five song on the Alternative Chart after "One Thing", which had peaked at number five, and it later tied 30 Seconds to Mars "The Kill (Bury Me)" and Red Jumpsuit Apparatus "Face Down" for the record of spending the most weeks on that chart (52 weeks). The record has since been broken by Rise Against's "Savior". It also found great success on the Billboard Adult Top 40, eventually climbing peaking at number three, their second top three song on that chart after "One Thing", which had reached number two. It also hit number one on its recurrent chart. The song topped three million digital downloads in the United States in late December 2010, and as of January 2015, the song has sold 3.4 million copies in the U.S. The single has been certified six-times platinum (2,457,058 downloads) by the RIAA.

The track peaked at number 12 on the Australian Singles Chart based on downloads alone; an amazing achievement considering eighty percent of single sales come from physical releases. "Paralyzer" is one of the most successful hits for the band. At the end of the year, the single ranked number 58 for the year in Australia.

On the Canadian Singles Chart, the song became the band's second number one following 2003's "One Thing." It also did well on the Canadian Hot 100, reaching number three. The song later debuted at number 10 on the New Zealand RIANZ chart in February 2008, becoming the band's first charting song there. It climbed to number seven the following week.

In September 2023, for the 35th anniversary of Alternative Airplay, Billboard published a list of the top 100 most successful songs in the chart's history; "Paralyzer" was ranked at number 45.

== Usage in media ==
The song has been featured on the television series Gossip Girl and Greek. It is also a playable song in the rhythm game Rock Revolution by Konami; although the game's producers have stated that all songs will be covers, the song is one of two for which the game uses the original master recording (the other being "Given Up" by Linkin Park). The song is also a playable song in the rhythm game Band Hero by Activision. The song is also on the Rock Band Network, and was introduced as DLC into Rocksmith by Ubisoft. The song is also part of the third game in the Guitar Hero On Tour Series for the Nintendo DS, Guitar Hero On Tour: Modern Hits.

== Charts ==
=== Weekly charts ===
Weekly chart performance for "Paralyzer"
Chart (2007–2008)	Peak position
Australia (ARIA)	12
Canada Hot 100 (Billboard)	3
Canada CHR/Top 40 (Billboard)	7
Canada Hot AC (Billboard)	4
Canada Rock (Billboard)	1
France Radio (SNEP)	91
New Zealand (Recorded Music NZ)	7
US Billboard Hot 100	6
US Alternative Airplay (Billboard)	1
US Mainstream Rock (Billboard)	1
US Pop 100 (Billboard)	7

=== Year-end charts ===
2007 year-end chart performance for "Paralyzer"
Chart (2007)	Position
US Billboard Hot 100	98
US Alternative Songs (Billboard)	2
US Mainstream Rock (Billboard)	2

2008 year-end chart performance for "Paralyzer"
Chart (2008)	Position
Australia (ARIA)	58
Canada (Canadian Hot 100)	64
US Billboard Hot 100	25
US Adult Top 40 (Billboard)	7
US Alternative Songs (Billboard)	37
US Mainstream Top 40 (Billboard)	29

== Certifications ==
Certifications for "Paralyzer"
Region	Certification	Certified units/sales
Canada (Music Canada)	5× Platinum	400,000^{‡}
Canada (Music Canada) Ringtone	Platinum	40,000^{*}
New Zealand (RMNZ)	2× Platinum	60,000^{‡}
United Kingdom (BPI)	Silver	200,000^{‡}
United States (RIAA)	6× Platinum	6,000,000^{‡}
United States (RIAA) Mastertone	Platinum	1,000,000^{*}
^{*} Sales figures based on certification alone.^{‡} Sales+streaming figures based on certification alone.
