= Them vs. You vs. Me =

Studio album by Finger Eleven
- Released: March 6, 2007
- Recorded: 2006
- Studio: Groovemaster (Chicago)
- Genres: Alternative rock; post-grunge; hard rock; funk rock
- Length: 40:24; 44:36 (Canadian release)
- Label: Wind-up
- Producer: Johnny K

Finger Eleven chronology
Finger Eleven (2003)	Them vs. You vs. Me (2007)	Life Turns Electric (2010)

Singles from Them vs. You vs. Me
- 1. "Paralyzer" Released: March 1, 2007; 2. "Falling On" Released: June 28, 2007; 3. "I'll Keep Your Memory Vague" Released: October 12, 2007; 4. "Talking to the Walls" Released: March 2008

Them vs. You vs. Me is the fifth studio album by the Canadian rock band Finger Eleven. Originally titled Sense of a Spark, the album was released by Wind-up Records on March 6, 2007. It peaked at number 31 on the US Billboard 200 and number two on the Canadian Albums Chart, making it the band's highest entry on both charts. By May 17, 2008, the album had sold 650,342 copies in the United States and had been certified Gold by the RIAA.

The album won the 2008 Juno Award for Rock Album of the Year.

== Critical reception ==
Professional ratings
Review scores
Source	Rating
AllMusic	3/5 stars
Entertainment Weekly	C

AllMusic senior editor Stephen Thomas Erlewine was conflicted with the album, praising the flourishes of disco-rock and funk in tracks like "Paralyzer" and "Lost My Way" but felt there wasn't enough of it in "a collection of otherwise colorless but capable by-the-book alt-rock", concluding with: "So, the variety of rhythms, along with the increasing emphasis on acoustic-based power ballads, gives Them vs. You vs. Me the greatest musical variety of any Finger Eleven record, but they remain boxed in by their good intentions: they remain a group that's too polite to dislike but too well-mannered to remember." Chris Willman of Entertainment Weekly said of the band's change in musical direction throughout the record, "Mostly, though, their newfound malleability results in cravenly radio-baiting ballads like "I'll Keep Your Memory Vague" — a title that may also describe listeners' reaction to this forgettable fare."

== Track listing ==
All tracks are written by Finger Eleven.

No.	Title	Length
1.	"Paralyzer"	3:28
2.	"Falling On"	3:07
3.	"I'll Keep Your Memory Vague"	3:46
4.	"Lost My Way"	4:00
5.	"So-So Suicide"	3:15
6.	"Window Song"	3:39
7.	"Sense of a Spark"	2:55
8.	"Talking to the Walls"	4:04
9.	"Change the World"	3:46
10.	"Gather & Give"	3:11
11.	"Easy Life"	5:12
Total length:		40:24

=== Bonus tracks ===
12. "Change the World [Acoustic Mix]" – 3:43 (Canada deluxe version)
13. "Sacrifice [B-Side]" – 3:45 (Canada and UK deluxe version)
14. "Them vs. You vs. Me" – 4:12 (Canada and UK deluxe version)
15. "Falling On [Live]" – 3:18 (Canada deluxe version)
16. "Paralyzer [Live]" – 3:34 (Canada deluxe version)

== Credits ==
Source - All music

- Scott Anderson - vocals
- James Black - lead guitar, vocals
- Rick Jackett - rhythm guitar
- Sean Anderson - bass
- Rich Beddoe - drums

Production

- Johnny K - producer, engineering, mixing
- Ted Jensen - mastering
- Diana Meltzer - A&R

== Charts ==
=== Weekly charts ===
Weekly chart performance for Them vs. You vs. Me
Chart (2007–2008)	Peak position
Australian Albums (ARIA)	37
Canadian Albums (Billboard)	2
New Zealand Albums (RMNZ)	17
US Billboard 200	31
US Top Rock Albums (Billboard)	11
US Top Alternative Albums (Billboard)	14

=== Year-end charts ===
2007 year-end chart performance for Them vs. You vs. Me
Chart (2007)	Position
US Billboard 200	183

2008 year-end chart performance for Them vs. You vs. Me
Chart (2008)	Position
US Billboard 200	139

== Certifications ==
Certifications for Them vs. You vs. Me
Region	Certification	Certified units/sales
Canada (Music Canada)	Platinum	100,000^{^}
New Zealand (RMNZ)	Gold	7,500^{‡}
United States (RIAA)	Gold	500,000^{^}
^{^} Shipments figures based on certification alone.^{‡} Sales+streaming figures based on certification alone.
