= Falling On =

Single by Finger Eleven

from the album Them vs. You vs. Me
- Released: June 28, 2007
- Recorded: 2006–2007
- Genre: Alternative rock, funk rock
- Length: 3:07
- Label: Wind-up
- Songwriters: Scott Anderson, Sean Anderson, Rich Beddoe, James Black, Rick Jackett
- Producer: Johnny K

Finger Eleven singles chronology
"Paralyzer" (2007)	"Falling On" (2007)	"I'll Keep Your Memory Vague" (2007)

Music video
- "Falling On" on YouTube

"Falling On" is a song by Canadian alternative rock band Finger Eleven. It was released in June 2007 as the second single from the album, Them vs. You vs. Me.

== Video ==
The band premiered the video on July 3, 2007, on an episode of MuchOnDemand. The video for "Falling On" starts off with the band playing in a digital-like white world made out of different dots. When the band nears the end of the first chorus, the dots fall and come back up. At the end of the video, the dots get sucked away and the band is left in the white world. The video reached number one on the Much Music Countdown.

== Charts ==
Chart (2007–2008)	Peak position
Canada Rock Top 30 (Radio & Records)	1
Canada Hot 100 (Billboard)	36
US Alternative Airplay (Billboard)	31
US Mainstream Rock (Billboard)	25
