= Five Crooked Lines =

Studio album by Finger Eleven
- Released: July 31, 2015
- Recorded: November 8–28, 2014
- Studio: Low Country Sound (Nashville, Tennessee)
- Genre: Alternative rock; hard rock
- Length: 50:03
- Label: The Bicycle Music Company
- Producer: Dave Cobb

Finger Eleven chronology
Life Turns Electric (2010)	Five Crooked Lines (2015)	Greatest Hits (2023)

Singles from Five Crooked Lines
- 1. "Wolves and Doors" Released: June 9, 2015; 2. "Gods of Speed" Released: October 9, 2015; 3. "Blackout Song" Released: February 12, 2016; 4. "Not Going to Be Afraid" Released: September 12, 2016

Professional ratings
Review scores
Source	Rating
AllMusic	3.5/5 stars
Ultimate Guitar.com	(5.6/10)

Five Crooked Lines is the seventh studio album by the Canadian rock band Finger Eleven, released July 31, 2015. It is their first without drummer Rich Beddoe, after his departure in 2013, replaced by Chris Powell.

== Writing and recording ==
On April 5, 2013, Finger Eleven tweeted: "The official inertia of our new album is growing." Toward the end of the year, they parted ways with longtime drummer Rich Beddoe.

In November 2014, they announced via Facebook that Chris Powell will drum on the album. They recorded the album between November 8, 2014, and November 28, 2014. By January 29, 2015, the album was in the final stages of production.

On April 25, 2015, an open casting call was made for the album's first single's music video. "Wolves and Doors" premiered on Finger Eleven's VEVO page in June and was seen 100,000 times by July 31.

== Critical reception ==
Fives Crooked Lines received mixed reviews. James Christopher Monger of allMusic thought it "doesn't deviate too much from the band's post-grunge past, but it is built from more volatile stuff". Ultimate Guitar Archive gave a mixed review: "Five Crooked Lines is not a completely avoidable album, but it's nothing to get that excited about."

== Track listing ==
All tracks are written by Finger Eleven.

No.	Title	Length
1.	"Gods of Speed"	3:31
2.	"Criminal"	3:13
3.	"Save Your Breath"	3:02
4.	"Wolves and Doors"	3:07
5.	"Come On, Oblivion"	7:16
6.	"Not Going to Be Afraid"	3:46
7.	"Five Crooked Lines"	3:43
8.	"Blackout Song"	4:04
9.	"Absolute Truth"	3:05
10.	"Lost for Words"	5:24
11.	"Sensory Eraser"	3:33
12.	"A New Forever"	4:28
Total length:		50:03

== Personnel ==
Finger Eleven

- Scott Anderson - vocals
- James Black - guitar, vocals
- Rick Jackett - guitar
- Sean Anderson - bass

Additional

- Chris Powell - drums

== Charts ==
Chart (2015)	Peak position
Canadian Albums (Billboard)	15
US Hard Rock Albums (Billboard)	16
US Rock Albums (Billboard)	44
