= One Thing (Finger Eleven song) =

2003 single by Finger Eleven

Single by Finger Eleven

from the album Finger Eleven
- Released: September 8, 2003
- Length: 4:39 (album version); 3:32 (radio edit)
- Label: Wind-up
- Songwriters: Scott Anderson; James Black
- Producer: Johnny K

Finger Eleven singles chronology
"Good Times" (2003)	"One Thing" (2003)	"Absent Elements" (2004)

Music video
- "One Thing" on YouTube

"One Thing" is a song by the Canadian rock band Finger Eleven, released on September 8, 2003, as the second single from their self-titled third album (2003). It reached number 16 on the US Billboard Hot 100 and entered the top 10 on three other Billboard charts. In Canada, it became a top-10 hit on contemporary hit radio.

== Release ==
The band Finger Eleven had thought their single "Stay in Shadow" from their 2003 album Finger Eleven would become a popular hit, but strong success fell on "One Thing" instead, although the track didn't find wide mainstream attention until several months after its 2003 release. "One Thing" reached number five on the US Billboard Modern Rock Tracks chart and stayed there for 26 weeks. It also peaked at number 16 on the Billboard Hot 100, number two on the Billboard Adult Top 40 chart, and number 23 on the Billboard Adult Contemporary chart.

== Music video ==
The song won the 2004 MuchMusic Video Award for Best Video. The music video features black-and-white footage of the band in a surreal nocturnal environment featuring a beach with a checkered pattern shore. A massive hourglass is seen on the checkered floor as well as band members perched on tall stands and leafless trees. Other imagery includes a crow, a woman standing over thousands of candles along a building floor, a symphony orchestra conductor conducting an empty orchestra, and a musical box with a spinning, lifelike ballerina. The "One Thing" video is featured on WWE's Cheating Death, Stealing Life: The Eddie Guerrero Story and Hard Knocks: The Chris Benoit Story DVDs as an extra.

== Charts ==
=== Weekly charts ===
Chart (2003–2005)	Peak position
Canada CHR (Nielsen BDS)	6
Canada CHR/Pop Top 30 (Radio & Records)	28
Canada Rock Top 30 (Radio & Records)	14
US Billboard Hot 100	16
US Adult Contemporary (Billboard)	23
US Adult Top 40 (Billboard)	2
US Mainstream Rock Tracks (Billboard)	38
US Mainstream Top 40 (Billboard)	11
US Modern Rock Tracks (Billboard)	5
US Triple-A (Billboard)	3

=== Year-end charts ===
Chart (2004)	Position
US Billboard Hot 100	66
US Adult Top 40 (Billboard)	16
US Mainstream Top 40 (Billboard)	38
US Modern Rock Tracks (Billboard)	26
US Triple-A (Billboard)	28

Chart (2005)	Position
US Adult Contemporary (Billboard)	43
US Adult Top 40 (Billboard)	10

== Release history ==
Region	Date	Formats	Label	Ref(s).
United States	September 8, 2003	Mainstream rock; active rock; alternative radio	Wind-up	
United States	March 15, 2004	Contemporary hit; hot adult contemporary radio	Wind-up	
