= Adema discography =

Works of American rock band Adema

- Studio albums: 4
- Extended plays: 3
- Singles: 11
- Music videos: 7

The discography of American rock band Adema consists of four studio albums, three extended plays, eleven singles and seven music videos.

== Albums ==
=== Studio albums ===
List of studio albums, with selected chart positions and certifications
Title	Album details	Peak chart positions						Sales	Certifications
Title	Album details	US	US Ind.	SWE	UK	UK Ind.	UK Rock	Sales	Certifications
Adema	Released: August 21, 2001 (US); Label: Arista; Formats: CD, CS, digital download	27	—	—	168	—	18	US: 670,000	RIAA: Gold
Unstable	Released: August 12, 2003 (US); Label: Arista; Formats: CD, digital download	43	—	—	120	—	15	US: 112,000	
Planets	Released: April 5, 2005 (US); Label: Earache; Formats: CD, digital download	152	11	38	—	27	20		
Kill the Headlights	Released: June 26, 2007 (US); Label: Immortal; Formats: CD, digital download	—	—	—	—	—	—		
"—" denotes a recording that did not chart or was not released in that territory.

=== Extended plays ===
List of extended plays, with selected chart positions
Title	Album details	Peak chart positions		Sales
Title	Album details	UK	UK Rock	Sales
Insomniac's Dream	Released: November 5, 2002 (US); Label: Arista; Formats: CD, LP, digital download	— (Note: Insomniac's Dream was deemed ineligible to enter the UK Singles Chart by the Official Charts Company, as it exceeded the maximum track length for a release to be considered a single; it did, however, peak at number eight on the UK Budget Albums Chart.)	32	US: 48,922
Tornado	Released: March 21, 2005 (US); Label: Earache; Formats: Digital download	—	—	
Topple the Giants	Released: April 2, 2013 (US); Label: Pavement; Formats: CD, digital download	—	—	
The Cerberus EP	Released: 2023 (US); Label: Self Released; Formats: CD	—	—	

== Singles ==
List of singles, with selected chart positions, showing year released and album name
Title	Year	Peak chart positions				Album
Title	Year	US Alt.	US Main. Rock	UK	UK Rock	Album
"Giving In"	2001	14	16	62	6	Adema
"The Way You Like It"	2001	15	21	61	—	Adema
"Freaking Out"	2002	36	25	—	—	Adema
"Immortal"	2002	—	—	—	—	Insomniac's Dream
"Unstable"	2003	37	25	46	5	Unstable
"Promises"	2003	—	—	—	—	Unstable
"Tornado"	2005	—	—	82	5	Planets
"Shoot the Arrows"	2005	—	—	—	—	Planets
"Cold and Jaded"	2007	—	—	—	—	Kill the Headlights
"All These Years"	2008	—	—	—	—	Kill the Headlights
"Resolution"	2013	—	—	—	—	Topple the Giants
"Ready to Die"	2021	—	—	—	—	The Cerberus EP
"Violent Principles"	2022	—	—	—	—	The Cerberus EP
"—" denotes a recording that did not chart or was not released in that territory.

== Music videos ==
List of music videos, showing year released and director
Title	Year	Director(s)	Album
"Giving In"	2001	Paul Fedor	Adema
"The Way You Like It"	2001	Gregory Dark	Adema
"Immortal"	2002	—N/a	Insomniac's Dream
"Unstable"	2003	Kevin Kerslake	Unstable
"Tornado"	2005	Paolo Doppieri	Planets
"Planets"	2005	Rob Schroeder	Planets
"Human Nature"	2007	—N/a	Kill The Headlights
"Ready to Die"	2021	Oscar Gutierrez	The Cerberus EP
"Violent Principles"	2022	Oscar Gutierrez	The Cerberus EP
