= Great Divide =

Great Divide or The Great Divide may refer to:

== Places ==
- Continental Divide of the Americas, the most common meaning
- Great Divide Basin, an endorheic drainage basin in south central Wyoming, US
- Great Divide Montana, a ski area near Helena, Montana, US
- Great Divide Mountain Bike Route, a bicycle route from Canada to New Mexico, US
- Great Divide Trail, a wilderness hiking trail in the Canadian Rockies
- Great Dividing Range, a mountain range on Australia's east coast
- Great Dividing Trail, a hiking and mountain-biking track through the Goldfields region of Victoria, Australia

== Film, theater, and television ==
- The Great Divide, a 1907 play by William Vaughn Moody, with three film adaptations:
  - The Great Divide (1915 film), a silent film directed by Edgar Lewis
  - The Great Divide (1925 film), a silent MGM film directed by Reginald Barker, starring Alice Terry and Wallace Beery
  - The Great Divide (1929 film), a First National Pictures film directed by Reginald Barker, starring Dorothy Mackaill and Myrna Loy

=== Television episodes ===
- "The Great Divide", Avatar: The Last Airbender season 1, episode 11 (2005)
- "The Great Divide", Ball in the Family season 5, episode 1 (2019)
- "The Great Divide", Bull season 5, episode 2 (2020)
- "The Great Divide", Dance Moms season 5, episode 9 (2015)
- "The Great Divide", Inspector Gadget season 1, episode 33 (1983)
- "The Great Divide", My Little Pony: Pony Life season 1, episode 25b (2021)
- "The Great Divide", Mystery Diners season 5, episode 8 (2014)
- "The Great Divide", Survivor: Thailand episode 2 (2002)
- "The Great Divide", Texas Ranch House episode 4 (2006)
- "The Great Divide", The Real Housewives of Beverly Hills season 2, episode 12 (2011)
- "The Great Divide", The Real Housewives of Durban season 4, episode 9 (2024)
- "The Great Divide", The Real Housewives of Jersey series 2, episode 10 (2022)
- "The Great Divide", The Real Housewives of Melbourne season 4, episode 11 (2018)
- "The Great Divide", The Real Housewives of Orange County season 12, episode 1 (2017)
- "The Great Divide", The Secret Life of Us season 2, episode 16 (2002)
- "The Great Divide", The U.S. of Archie episode 14 (1974)
- "The Great Divide", Toybox season 1, episode 56 (2010)
- "The Great Divide", Transformers: Robots in Disguise season 4, episode 7 (2017)

== Literature ==
- The Great Divide (novel), a 1935 novel by Alan Sullivan about the construction of the Canadian Pacific Railway
- The Great Divide (Hodson book), a 1994 book by H. V. Hodson
- The Great Divide: The Conflict Between Washington and Jefferson That Defined America, Then and Now, a 2015 book by Thomas Fleming
- The Great Divide: Unequal Societies and What We Can Do About Them, a 2015 book by Joseph Stiglitz

== Music ==
- The Great Divide (band), a country music band

=== Albums ===
- Great Divide (Semisonic album), 1996
- Great Divide (Twin Atlantic album), 2014
- Great Divide, by the Narcs, 1984
- The Great Divide (Allen/Lande album) or the title song, 2014
- The Great Divide (Busby Marou album) or the title song, 2019
- The Great Divide (Enchant album) or the title song, 2014
- The Great Divide (The Generators album) or the title song, 2007
- The Great Divide (Ice Age album), 1999
- The Great Divide (Noah Kahan album) or the title song, 2026
- The Great Divide (Scott Stapp album) or the title song, 2005
- The Great Divide (Tommy Shaw album) or the title song, 2011
- The Great Divide (Willie Nelson album) or the title song, 2002
- The Great Divide (EP), by Dragon, or the title song, 2011
- The Great Divide, by Unida, 2003

=== Songs ===
- "Great Divide", by the Cardigans from First Band on the Moon, 1996
- "Great Divide", by George Jones and Tammy Wynette from Me and the First Lady, 1972
- "Great Divide", by Hanson from The Walk, 2007
- "Great Divide", by Jack Ingram from This Is It, 2007
- "Great Divide", by Nick Carter from I'm Taking Off, 2011
- "Great Divide", by Piney Gir Country Roadshow, 2006
- "Great Divide" by Yola from Stand for Myself, 2021
- "The Great Divide" (Scott Stapp song), 2005
- "The Great Divide" (McClain Sisters song), 2012
- "The Great Divide" (Noah Kahan song), 2026
- "San Antone" / "The Great Divide", by Whiskeytown, 2009
- "The Great Divide", by 311 from Stereolithic, 2014
- "The Great Divide", by Anti-Flag from American Spring, 2015
- "The Great Divide", by Billy Strings with Luke Combs, 2021
- "The Great Divide", by Breaking Benjamin from Dark Before Dawn, 2015
- "The Great Divide", by Celldweller from Offworld, 2017
- "The Great Divide", by David Knopfler from Release, 1983
- "The Great Divide," by Emmy Rossum from Inside Out, 2007
- "The Great Divide", by Gene Watson, 1989
- "The Great Divide", by In This Moment from The Dream, 2008
- "The Great Divide", by Joanie Sommers, 1968
- "The Great Divide", by Laibach from WAT, 2003
- "The Great Divide", by Light the Torch from Revival, 2018
- "The Great Divide", by The Mowgli's from 'Waiting for the Dawn, 2013
- "The Great Divide", by Neil Young from Silver & Gold, 2000
- "The Great Divide", by Pinhead Gunpowder from Goodbye Ellston Avenue, 1997
- "The Great Divide", by Point of Grace from The Whole Truth, 1995
- "The Great Divide", by Rebecca Black, 2016
- "The Great Divide", by Roy Clark, 1974
- "The Great Divide", by the Shins, 2020
- "The Great Divide", by Velvetine, sung by Aruna, 2012
- "The Great Divide", by VNV Nation from Of Faith, Power and Glory, 2009

== Other uses ==
- Great Divide Brewing Company, a microbrewery based in Denver, Colorado
- Great Divide Trophy, presented to the winner of the Montana–Montana State football rivalry

== See also ==
- Across the Great Divide (disambiguation)
- Along the Great Divide, a 1951 American Western film directed by Raoul Walsh
- Asterix and the Great Divide, a 1980 comic by Albert Uderzo
- Great Divergence, a historical shift during which the Western world achieved economic and political superiority over Eastern powers
