= Topple the Giants =

EP by Adema
- Released: April 2, 2013
- Recorded: 2011–2012
- Genre: Nu metal
- Length: 27:07
- Label: Pavement Entertainment

Adema chronology
Kill the Headlights (2007)	Topple the Giants (2013)

Singles from Topple the Giants
- 1. "Resolution" Released: March 2, 2013

Professional ratings
Review scores
Source	Rating
Melodic	2.5/5 stars

Topple the Giants is the second EP by American rock band Adema, released on April 2, 2013 by Pavement Entertainment. It marks the band's first release in 6 years, after the release of Kill the Headlights. It is the only release to feature guitarist Tim Fluckey on lead vocals. Additionally, it is the band's first release as a three-piece. The EP includes new music, along with older songs re-recorded with the new line-up.

== Background ==
On July 19, 2011, Adema announced they would go to the studio soon to record new material. Later that year, they announced an EP that would be available for digital release in February 2012 with a special edition physical release in March, along with a studio album release in the summer. However, on May 22, 2012, they announced that the EP was delayed until further notice. Finally, after signing a record deal with Pavement Entertainment in January 2013, the band announced the EP's release date to be April 2, 2013.

The album artwork features the band fighting a giant, superimposed into an image of the great tower at Chepstow Castle, in Wales. The Metal website Metalsucks put this album artwork as considered to be one of the worst album covers ever.

== Track listing ==
All songs written by Adema, except otherwise noted.

No.	Title	Writer(s)	Length
1.	"Resolution"		3:21
2.	"Topple the Giants"		4:03
3.	"Lions"		4:08
4.	"Unstable" (Originally recorded in Unstable)	Adema, Mark Chavez	3:20
5.	"Immortal" (Originally recorded in Insomniac's Dream)	Adema, M. Chavez	4:03
6.	"Planets" (Originally recorded in Planets)	Adema, Luke Carracioli	4:03
7.	"Giving In" (Originally recorded in Adema)	Adema, M. Chavez	4:49

== Personnel ==
- Tim Fluckey - lead vocals, lead guitar, keyboards, synthesizers, programming
- Dave DeRoo - bass guitar, backing vocals
- Kris Kohls - drums
