= Paul Fedor (director) =

Paul Fedor is an American music video director and visual effects designer.

Fedor studied illustration at the Parsons School of Design and has been a part of the computer graphics industry since 1994. He directed music videos and commercials.

He is the founder of the production company Natural Selection.

He has authored one book, Essence: The Face by Ballistic Publishing. The Face was the first book on modern texturing and look development of CG Humans and Digi-Doubles for Video Games, TV, and Film.

== Filmography ==
- National Treasure: Book of Secrets (2007)
- Cirque du Freak: The Vampire's Assistant (2009)
- 2012 (2009)
- The Sorcerer's Apprentice (2010)
- Unstoppable (2010)
- The Next Three Days (2010)
- All Good Things (2010)
- Immortals (2011)
- The Devil Inside (2012)
- Journey 2: The Mysterious Island (2012)
- Hotel Transylvania (2012)
- Mockingbird Lane (2012)
- Pacific Rim (2013)
- Captain America: The Winter Soldier (2014)
- Divergent (2014)
- Godzilla (2014)
- Game of Thrones (2014)
- Furious 7 (2015)
- San Andreas (2015)
- Pan (2015)
- In the Heart of the Sea (2015)
- Alice Through the Looking Glass (2016)
- Star Trek Beyond (2016)
- Fantastic Beasts and Where to Find Them (2016)
- Sleepy Hollow (2017)
- The Fate of the Furious (2017)
- Siren (2018)
- Shadow and Bone (2021)
- Moonfall (2022)
- The Batman (2022)
- Stranger Things (2022)
- The Gray Man (2022)
- Black Adam (2022)
- Slumberland (2022)
- Shazam! Fury of the Gods (2023)
- Meg 2: The Trench (2023)

== Videography ==
- "Get Born Again", Alice in Chains (1999)
- "Giving In", Adema (2001)
- "The Nobodies", Marilyn Manson (2001)
- "The Middle", Jimmy Eat World (2001)
- "Youth of the Nation", P.O.D. (2001)
- "Running Away", Hoobastank (2002)
- "Fine Again", Seether (2002)
- "Capricorn (A Brand New Name)", Thirty Seconds to Mars (2002)
- "The Game of Love", Santana featuring Michelle Branch (2002)
- "Fallen", Sarah McLachlan (2003)
- "Minerva", Deftones (2003)
- "Pain", Jimmy Eat World (2004)
- "Worn Me Down", Rachael Yamagata (2004)
- "World on Fire", Sarah McLachlan (2005)
- "Attack", Thirty Seconds to Mars (2005)
- "The Great Divide", Scott Stapp (2005)
- "Boston", Augustana (2006)
- "Lithium", Evanescence (2006)
- "All Around Me", Flyleaf (2007)
