= Unstable (Adema album) =

Studio album by Adema
- Released: August 19, 2003
- Recorded: 2002–2003
- Studios: Bay 7 Studios, Valley Village, CA
- Genres: Nu metal, post-grunge
- Length: 40:48
- Label: Arista
- Producer: Howard Benson

Adema chronology
Insomniac's Dream (2002)	Unstable (2003)	Planets (2005)

Singles from Unstable
- 1. "Unstable" Released: June 23, 2003; 2. "Promises" Released: October 7, 2003

Professional ratings
Review scores
Source	Rating
AllMusic	2/5 stars
Blender	3/5 stars
Melodic	3/5 stars
Metal Hammer	8/10
Rock Hard	8/10
Rolling Stone	2/5 stars

Unstable is the second studio album by the American rock band Adema, and is the final album to feature its full original lineup with lead vocalist Mark Chavez and guitarist Mike Ransom departing from the band after its release and then again after their reunion, although they returned to the band in March 2017 (only for Mark to leave once again in 2019). The album was released on August 19, 2003 by Arista Records. It features the self-titled single "Unstable" and has sold about 400,000 copies worldwide. Many songs relied more on instrumentation and harmony instead of distortion in comparison to their previous album. It debuted at number 43 on the Billboard 200 before quickly falling off the chart.

== Track listing ==
=== CD ===
All lyrics are written by Mark Chavez; all music is composed by Kris Kohls, Mike Ransom, Dave DeRoo & Tim Fluckey.

No.	Title	Length
1.	"Co-Dependent"	3:28
2.	"Rip the Heart Out of Me"	2:23
3.	"Stand Up"	3:04
4.	"Unstable"	3:12
5.	"Promises"	4:16
6.	"Blame Me"	3:55
7.	"So Fortunate"	3:47
8.	"Stressin' Out"	3:37
9.	"Do You Hear Me"	3:26
10.	"Let Go"	3:04
11.	"Betrayed Me"	3:22
12.	"Needles"	3:08
Total length:		40:48

Japanese Edition
No.	Title	Length
13.	"Someone Else's Lies"	3:27
Total length:		44:15

Re-release 2012
No.	Title	Length
13.	"Someone Else's Lies"	3:27
14.	"Immortal"	4:09
Total length:		48:24

=== Limited Edition DVD ===
- "Unstable" (Video)
- "Giving In" (Video)
- "The Way You Like It" (Video)
- "Immortal" (Video)
- Behind-The-Scenes Footage
- Photo Gallery
- Weblinks
- & More!

== Credits ==
Adema

- Mark Chavez – vocals
- Tim Fluckey – lead guitar, backing vocals, keyboards, programming
- Mike Ransom – rhythm guitar
- Dave DeRoo – bass, backing vocals
- Kris Kohls – drums

Additional musicians

- Synth Strings on "So Fortunate" by Deborah Lurie

Production

- Produced by Howard Benson
- Executive Producer: Antonio "LA" Reid
- Recorded by Mike Plotnikoff at Bay 7 Studios, Valley Village, CA
- Mixed by Alan Moulder at The Townhouse, London, England
- "Unstable" Mix Engineer: Andy Saunders
- "Needles" & "Stressin' Out" Mixed by Mike Plotnikoff at Skip Saylor Recording, Los Angeles, CA
- Instrument Rentals Provided by Megawatt Rentals
- Pro Tools Operator: Eric Miller
- Pre-Production Pro Tools Operator: Patrick Shevelin
- Pro Tools Editing: Vince Jones
- Studio Drum Technician: Gersh for Drum Fetish
- Mastered by Tom Baker at Precision Mastering, LA
- A&R: Joshua Sarubin
- A&R Administrator: Barbara Wesotski
- Producer Coordinator: Dana Childs at Nettwek Producer Management
- Career Direction: Scott Welch & Mark Botting for Mosaic Music Group
- Legal Affairs: Terri DiPaolo
- Business Management: Wayne Kamemoto for Gudvi, Sussman & Oppenheim
- Booking Agent: Ethan Rose for William Morris Agency
- Creative Designer: Joe Mana-Nitzberg
- Art Direction & Design: Jeff Schulz
- Photography: Joseph Cultice
- Styling: Mandy Line

== Charts ==
Chart (2003)	Peak position
UK Rock & Metal Albums (Official Charts)	15
US Billboard 200	43

=== Singles ===
Year	Single	Chart	Position
2003	"Unstable"	US Hot Mainstream Rock Tracks	25
2003	"Unstable"	US Hot Modern Rock Tracks	38
