= Higher Power (Scott Stapp album) =

Studio album by Scott Stapp
- Released: March 15, 2024
- Studios: Sienna Recording Studios (Nashville, TN); The Cabin Studio (Los Angeles, CA); Thrasher Studios (Los Angeles, CA)
- Genres: Rock; alternative metal; post-grunge; hard rock
- Length: 39:12
- Label: Napalm
- Producers: Marti Frederiksen; Scott Stevens; Scott Stapp; Kevin Gruft

Scott Stapp chronology
| The Space Between the Shadows (2019) | Higher Power (2024) |

Higher Power is the fourth studio album by American musician Scott Stapp, released on March 15, 2024, by Napalm Records. It marks the first album in five years to feature Stapp, following The Space Between the Shadows (2019). The album features a heavier sound with influences from alternative metal, post-grunge, and hard rock.

Professional ratings
Review scores
| Source | Rating |
|---|---|
| The Prog Mind | 10/10 stars |
| Maximum Volume Music | 8.5/10 stars |
| Ever Metal | 7/10 stars |
| Boolin Tunes | 5/10 stars |
| Kerrang! | 3/5 stars |
| Metal Temple | 10/10 stars |

== Track listing ==
Adapted from Tidal.

| No. | Title | Writer(s) | Length |
|---|---|---|---|
| 1. | "Higher Power" | Scott Stapp; Scott Stevens | 3:47 |
| 2. | "Deadman's Trigger" | Stapp; Stevens; Marti Frederiksen; Blair Daly; Zac Maloy | 3:27 |
| 3. | "When Love Is Not Enough" | Stapp; Stevens; Frederiksen | 3:24 |
| 4. | "What I Deserve" (featuring Yiannis Papadopoulos) | Stapp; Frederiksen; Maloy; Yiannis Papadopoulos | 4:26 |
| 5. | "If These Walls Could Talk" (featuring Dorothy) | Stapp; Stevens; Frederiksen; Kylie Sackley | 3:33 |
| 6. | "Black Butterfly" | Stapp; Kevin Gruft | 3:20 |
| 7. | "Quicksand" (featuring Yiannis Papadopoulos) | Stapp; Andy Waldeck | 3:31 |
| 8. | "You're Not Alone" | Stapp; Frederiksen; Steve McEwan | 4:10 |
| 9. | "Dancing in the Rain" (featuring Yiannis Papadopoulos) | Stapp; Frederiksen; Papadopoulos | 5:19 |
| 10. | "Weight of the World" | Stapp; Maloy; Daly | 4:09 |
| Total length: | | | 39:12 |

== Personnel ==
Musicians

- Scott Stapp – lead vocals
- Yiannis Papadopoulos – guitar on "What I Deserve", "Quicksand", "Dancing in the Rain"
- Dorothy – guest vocals on "If These Walls Could Talk"

Production

- Evan Frederiksen – engineering
- Marti Frederiksen – engineering
- Scott Stevens – engineering
- Kevin Gruft – production and engineering on "Black Butterfly"
- Chris Baseford – mixing
- Joel Wanasek – mixing on "Black Butterfly"
- Ted Jensen – mastering at Sterling Sound
- Recorded at Sienna Recording Studios (Nashville, TN), The Cabin Studio (Los Angeles, CA), Thrasher Studios (Los Angeles, CA)
- Scott Kennedy – design (12 Inch Media)
- Alec Strickland – design (Volt Creative)
- Craig Yarman – design (Volt Creative)
