= Slow Suicide =

2013 single by Scott Stapp

Single by Scott Stapp

from the album Proof of Life
- Released: October 8, 2013
- Recorded: 2013
- Genre: Post-grunge; alternative metal; Christian rock
- Length: 3:30
- Label: Wind-up
- Songwriters: Scott Stapp, Scott C. Stevens
- Producer: Howard Benson

Scott Stapp singles chronology
"Surround Me" (2006)	"Slow Suicide" (2013)	"Dying to Live" (2014)

Music video
- "Slow Suicide" on YouTube

"Slow Suicide" is the fifth single by Scott Stapp, released on October 8, 2013. It is the first single from his second solo album Proof of Life, released on November 5, 2013. It is Stapp's first single to be released since "Surround Me" on October 31, 2006.

== Background ==
Stapp told Wind-Up Newsletter about the song: "I've always been heavy on metaphor and symbols, even to where I might hide behind fanciful language. Howard [Benson] helped me get straight to the point. The point is that for years I was slowly killing myself. Drugs and booze want to kill you instantly, but they’re patient and will take their time. The same is true of toxic relationships. I had to start off this story by declaring the most obvious of truths: that I had been torturing and poisoning myself in an attempt to snuff out my soul." "So many days I choose to suffer, living a lie," the lyrics say. "So many ways I chose to die."

== Chart performance ==
Chart (2014)	Peak position
US Christian Rock (Billboard)	1
US Hot Christian Songs (Billboard)	48
US Mainstream Rock (Billboard)	38
