= Ice Age (band) =

Musical band from New York City, USA

- Also known as: Soulfractured (2004–2006)
- Origin: Long Island, NY, U.S.
- Genres: Progressive metal
- Years active: 1992–2006; 2015–present
- Labels: Sensory; Magna Carta
- Members: Josh Pincus; Jimmy Pappas; Doug Odell; Hal Aponte
- Past members: Arron DiCesare; Mike Furey

Ice Age is a progressive rock band from New York City, USA.

Founded by guitarist Jimmy Pappas, vocalist/keyboardist Josh Pincus, drummer Hal Aponte and bassist Arron DiCesare, the band released their debut album in 1999, titled The Great Divide. Liberation followed in 2001, both on Magna Carta Records.

Ice Age were influenced by pop/progressive bands such as Yes, Kansas and Rush, but also by more modern progressive metal bands like Queensrÿche and Dream Theater.

In 2004, the band changed their name to Soulfractured. This was accompanied by an announced shift in the band's music: less overt progressive experimentation, with closer attention paid to melodic structure and songcraft. In this incarnation the band released the Soulfractured EP, made available through the band's websites. They had previously released the Little Bird EP (2004) as Ice Age. Shortly after the second EP's release, the group disbanded in 2006.

The band re-formed in 2015 under their original moniker. In May 2022, the band announced they had signed with Sensory Records and would be releasing their first album in 22 years in the fall. The album, Waves of Loss and Power, was released on March 10, 2023.

== Discography ==
Studio albums

- The Great Divide (1999)
- Liberation (2001)
- Waves of Loss and Power (2023)

EPs

- Little Bird (2004)
- Soulfractured (2006) (Released under band name Soulfractured)

== See also ==
- Spock's Beard
- Tool (band)
- Tesseract (band)
- Fates Warning
