= The Great Divide (Scott Stapp album) =

Studio album by Scott Stapp
- Released: November 22, 2005
- Recorded: 2004–2005
- Studio: SSE (Miami); Hit Factory Criteria (Miami)
- Genre: Post-grunge; hard rock; alternative metal
- Length: 42:42
- Label: Wind-up
- Producer: John Kurzweg; Scott Stapp; Ron Saint Germain

Scott Stapp chronology
The Great Divide (2005)	Proof of Life (2013)

Singles from The Great Divide
- 1. "The Great Divide" Released: September 26, 2005; 2. "Justify" Released: May 2006; 3. "Surround Me" Released: October 31, 2006

Professional ratings
Review scores
Source	Rating
AllMusic	2.5/5 stars
Cross Rhythms	9/10 stars

The Great Divide is the first solo album by Scott Stapp, the former vocalist for Creed. It was released on November 22, 2005. The album came about after the original breakup of Creed and Stapp's collaboration on the original songs inspired by Mel Gibson's 2004 film The Passion of the Christ. There is a common conception that the lyrics seem to make references to the original breakup of Creed in 2004. The Great Divide was certified platinum on December 14, 2005. John Kurzweg, who produced all three of Creed's prior albums, also produced The Great Divide. The album received mixed reviews from critics.

== Track listing ==
All tracks are written by Scott Stapp.

No.	Title	Length
1.	"Reach Out"	4:27
2.	"Fight Song"	4:06
3.	"Hard Way"	3:42
4.	"Justify"	5:23
5.	"Let Me Go"	4:15
6.	"Surround Me"	4:36
7.	"The Great Divide"	4:02
8.	"Sublime"	4:14
9.	"You Will Soar"	3:40
10.	"Broken"	4:17
Total length:		42:42

== Personnel ==
Musicians

- Scott Stapp – lead vocals
- Aristides Rincon – lead guitar
- John Curry – rhythm guitar
- Mitch Burman – bass
- Mark Archer – drums

Production

- John Kurzweg – producer, mixing (7), engineer
- Scott Stapp – producer, mixing
- John D. Thomas – co-producer, engineer
- Ron Saint Germain – mixing, additional production (10)
- Bobby Selvaggio – engineer
- Pete de Boer – Pro Tools mix engineer
- Robert A. Moses – assistant engineer
- Kitzie Perez – assistant engineer
- Javier Valverde – assistant engineer
- James R. Roach – assistant engineer
- Ron Taylor – digital editing
- Ronald Rincon – production assistant
- Craig Poole – guitar tech
- Mike Froedge – drum tech
- Bob Ludwig – mastering

== Charts ==
=== Weekly charts ===
Weekly chart performance for The Great Divide
Chart (2005–2006)	Peak position
New Zealand Albums (RMNZ)	29
US Billboard 200	19
US Top Rock Albums (Billboard)	21

=== Year-end charts ===
Year-end chart performance for The Great Divide
Chart (2006)	Position
US Billboard 200	179

== Certifications ==
Certifications for The Great Divide
Region	Certification	Certified units/sales
United States (RIAA)	Platinum	1,000,000^{^}
^{^} Shipments figures based on certification alone.

== Interviews ==
- Scott Stapp - The Great Divide (2006)
