= Proof of Life (Scott Stapp album) =

Studio album by Scott Stapp
- Released: November 5, 2013
- Recorded: 2013
- Studio: West Valley Studios in Woodland Hills, California
- Genre: Post-grunge; hard rock; alternative metal
- Length: 42:00
- Label: Wind-up
- Producer: Howard Benson

Scott Stapp chronology
The Great Divide (2005)	Proof of Life (2013)	The Space Between the Shadows (2019)

Singles from Proof of Life
- 1. "Slow Suicide" Released: October 8, 2013; 2. "Dying to Live" Released: June 5, 2014; 3. "Break Out" Released: October 25, 2014; 4. "Proof of Life" Released: January 4, 2015; 5. "Only One" Released: February 13, 2015

Proof of Life is the second solo album by American rock singer Scott Stapp. It was released on November 5, 2013. "This is the most meaningful record of my career," said Stapp. "I've made a lot of messes in my life but I've learned I can take a mess and turn it into a message. This album chronicles my struggles, my journey and it's the most honest record I have ever written." The album was produced by Howard Benson and mixed by Chris Lord-Alge.

== Critical reception ==
Professional ratings
Review scores
Source	Rating
AllMusic	3/5 stars
Broken Records magazine	4/5 stars
Christian Music Review	3.0/5
Cryptic Rock	4.5/5
Cross Rhythms	8/10 stars
HM	2.5/5 stars
Indie Vision Music	2/5 stars
Iowa State Daily	3.5/5
Jesus Freak Hideout	4/5 stars
National Rock Review	(favorable)
Rockadia	5/5
Ultimate Guitar	7/10

The album received mixed to positive reviews from critics. Stephen Thomas Erlewine of AllMusic described the album as being "something of a travelogue of a dark night of the soul" and wrote that Stapp is "at home when he's allowed to bellow alongside massive walls of guitars". Jack Arlin of SPIN said of the album, "It's oddly diverse. Stapp's reputation as a neo-grunge belter may be changing."

== Track listing ==
No.	Title	Writer(s)	Length
1.	"Slow Suicide"	Scott Stapp; Scott C. Stevens	3:30
2.	"Who I Am"	Alex Bodnar; John Curry; Stapp	2:43
3.	"Proof of Life"	Tyler Connolly; Stapp; Phil X	3:48
4.	"New Day Coming"	John Alicastro; Todd Clark; Mike Lauri; Stapp	3:47
5.	"Only One"	Doug Brown; Stapp	4:47
6.	"Break Out"	Mitch Allan; Julia Michaels; Jagger; Stapp	3:39
7.	"Hit Me More"	Dave Bassett; Stapp	3:26
8.	"Jesus Was a Rockstar"	Kara DioGuardi; Lenny Skolnik; Stapp	3:28
9.	"What Would Love Do"	Toby Gad; Stapp	4:32
10.	"Crash"	Stapp; Stevens	4:14
11.	"Dying to Live"	Blair Daly; Zac Maloy; Stapp	4:06
Total length:			42:00

Best Buy exclusive edition tracks
No.	Title	Length
12.	"Beautiful Cage"	3:28
13.	"Real Love"	3:48
Total length:		49:16

== Personnel ==
Musicians

- Scott Stapp – lead vocals
- Howard Benson – keyboards
- Phil X – guitar (1, 2, 7, 10, 11)
- Tim Pierce – guitar (3–11)
- John Paul Nesheiwat – guitar (6)
- Scott Stevens – guitar (10), backing vocals (10)
- Paul Bushnell – bass guitar
- Kenny Aronoff – drums (1, 2, 7, 10, 11)
- Josh Freese – drums (3, 6, 8, 9)
- Isaac Carpenter – drums (4, 5)

Production

- Howard Benson – production
- Mike Plotnikoff – engineer
- Hatsukazu "Hatch" Inagaki – vocal engineer, additional engineering
- Paul DeCarli – additional engineering, digital editing
- Alexander Attalla – assistant engineer
- Zack Foster – assistant engineer
- Anthony Diazdeleon – assistant engineer
- Lenny Skolnik – programming
- Chris Lord-Alge – mixing
- Nik Karpen – assistant mix engineer
- Ted Jensen – mastering
