= The Space Between the Shadows =

Studio album by Scott Stapp
- Released: July 19, 2019
- Studios: Poppy Studios, Sienna Studios, The Cabin
- Genres: Post-grunge; hard rock; alternative metal
- Length: 45:13
- Label: Napalm
- Producers: Scott Stevens, Marti Frederiksen

Scott Stapp chronology
Proof of Life (2013)	The Space Between the Shadows (2019)	Higher Power (2024)

Singles from The Space Between the Shadows
- 1. "Purpose for Pain" Released: March 22, 2019; 2. "Name" Released: April 23, 2019; 3. "Face of the Sun" Released: May 31, 2019; 4. "Gone Too Soon" Released: July 11, 2019; 5. "Survivor" Released: February 11, 2020

Professional ratings
Review scores
Source	Rating
AllMusic	3.5/5 stars
Classic Rock	3.5/5 stars
Planet Mosh	5/5 stars

The Space Between the Shadows is the third studio album from American musician Scott Stapp, released by Napalm Records on July 19, 2019. "Purpose for Pain" serves as the lead single.

== Track listing ==
Adapted from iTunes.

No.	Title	Writer(s)	Length
1.	"World I Used to Know"	Scott Stapp; Marti Frederiksen; Zac Maloy; Scott Stevens	4:05
2.	"Name"	Stapp; Frederiksen; Stevens	4:07
3.	"Purpose for Pain"	Stapp; Kevin Howard Gruft	3:18
4.	"Heaven in Me"	Stapp; Frederiksen; Maloy; Stevens	4:34
5.	"Survivor"	Stapp; Frederiksen; Maloy; Stevens; Blair Daly	3:20
6.	"Wake Up Call"	Stapp; Frederiksen; Stevens	3:33
7.	"Face of the Sun"	Stapp; Frederiksen; Maloy; Stevens	3:09
8.	"Red Clouds"	Stapp; Frederiksen; Maloy	5:21
9.	"Gone Too Soon"	Stapp; Maloy; Daly	3:18
10.	"Ready to Love"	Stapp; Frederiksen; Maloy; Stevens	3:26
11.	"Mary's Crying"	Stapp; Maloy; Daly	3:24
12.	"Last Hallelujah"	Stapp; Frederiksen; Maloy; Stevens	3:38
Total length:			45:13

== Personnel ==
Musicians

- Scott Stapp – lead vocals
- Sammy Hudson – bass guitar, backing vocals
- Ben Flanders – guitar, backing vocals
- Yiannis Papadopoulos – lead guitar
- Dango Cellan – drums

Production

- Scott Stevens – co-producer, engineer
- Marti Frederiksen – co-producer, engineer
- Kevin "Thrasher" Gruft – additional production on "Purpose for Pain"
- Chris Baseford – mixing
- Howie Weinberg – mastering

== Charts ==
Chart (2019)	Peak position
Australian Digital Albums (ARIA)	37
Austrian Albums (Ö3 Austria)	50
German Albums (Offizielle Top 100)	36
Scottish Albums (Official Charts)	40
Swiss Albums (Schweizer Hitparade)	22
US Billboard 200	137
