= Insomniac's Dream =

2002 EP by Adema

EP by Adema
- Released: November 5, 2002
- Recorded: 2002
- Genres: Nu metal; electronic rock
- Length: 26:52
- Label: Arista
- Producers: Tobias Miller; Bill Appleberry; Richie Zito

Adema chronology
Adema (2001)	Insomniac's Dream (2002)	Unstable (2003)

Singles from Insomniac's Dream
- 1. "Immortal" Released: September 27, 2002

Insomniac's Dream is the first EP by American rock band Adema, and was released on November 5, 2002 after their self-titled debut album. Only the first three tracks are new, though "Shattered" was released on some international versions of Adema and "Nutshell" is a cover of an Alice in Chains song. "Immortal" was the theme song for Mortal Kombat: Deadly Alliance, and is the only song to have had a music video.

== Track listing ==
No.	Title	Writer(s)	Length
1.	"Immortal"	Adema	4:09
2.	"Shattered" (Self-Titled B-Side)	Adema	3:09
3.	"Nutshell" (Alice in Chains Cover)	Layne Staley, Jerry Cantrell, Mike Inez, Sean Kinney	4:28
4.	"Freaking Out" (Chris Vrenna Remix)	Adema, Bill Appleberry	3:52
5.	"The Way You Like It" (Sam "Sever" Citrin Remix)	Adema	3:55
6.	"Do What You Want to Do" (Live)	Adema	3:24
7.	"Giving In" (Radio Mix)	Adema	3:55

== Credits ==
Adema

- Mark Chavez – vocals, executive producer
- Tim Fluckey – guitar
- Mike Ransom – guitar
- Dave DeRoo – bass
- Kris Kohls – drums

Additional musicians

- Fran Cathcart – guitar, engineer
- Sam "Sever" Citrin – drums, engineer, mixing, effects, remixing, producer

Production

- Josh Surratt – mixing
- Richard Mouser – mixing
- Brian Reeves – mixing
- L.A. Reid – executive producer
- Richie Zito – producer
- Jeffrey Schulz – art direction, design
- Chris Vrenna – producer, remixing, mixing
- David Dominguez – engineer
- Joshua Sarubin – A&R
- Patrick Shevelin – engineer, Pro-Tools
- Annamaria DiSanto – photography
- Tim Harkins – assistant engineer
- Brian Nolan – photography
- Tobias Miller – producer, engineer
- Adema – producer
- Bill Appleberry – producer, engineer
- Mike Fraser – mixing
- David J. Holman – mixing

== Charts ==
Chart (2003)	Peak position
UK Rock & Metal Albums (Official Charts)	32
