= Dave DeRoo =

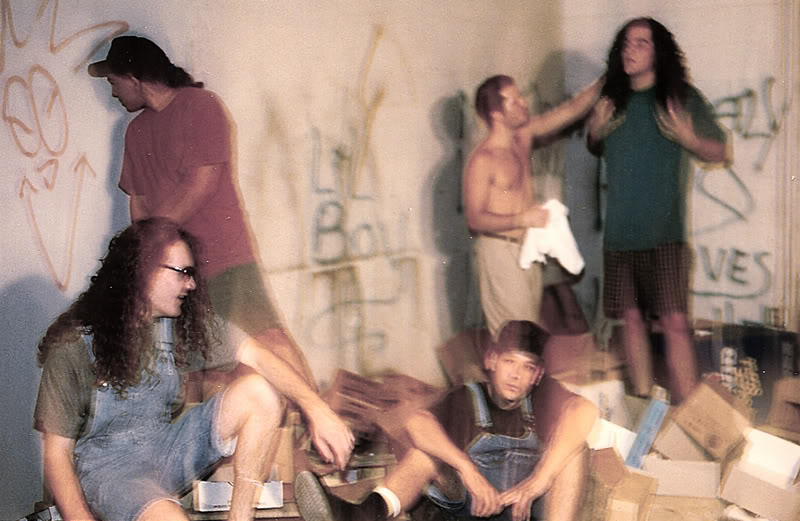
- Sexart in a candid picture 1992 (left to right): Ryan Shuck, Ray Solis, Jonathan Davis, Dennis Shinn, David DeRoo

Background information
- Also known as: Big Meat
- Born: David Clark DeRoo; September 3, 1974 (age 52); Bakersfield, California, United States
- Genres: Nu metal; alternative metal; hard rock; alternative rock; post-grunge; electronic rock; industrial metal
- Instruments: Bass, vocals
- Years active: 1989-present
- Labels: Arista, Earache Records, Immortal, Independent

David Clark DeRoo (born September 3, 1974) is an American rock musician, known primarily for his role as bassist of the rock band Adema.

== Early life ==
Dave DeRoo was born in Bakersfield, California; his father, Doug DeRoo, was a well-known radio DJ. Many of his earliest performances were while he attended East Bakersfield High School where he was in the graduating class of 1992.

== Professional career ==
=== Sexart ===
In 1991 DeRoo was one of the members of Sexart. Sexart has since gained cult notoriety for its connection with Korn and featured Jonathan Davis of Korn on vocals. Sexart, sometimes written SexArt or Sex Art featured musicians that would go on to careers with the bands Orgy, Dead by Sunrise, L.A.P.D, Korn, Cradle of Thorns, Videodrone, and Adema. Sexart was never signed to a major label contract and did not record a full length demo but is featured on the compilation CD “Cultivation ‘92”. After Jonathan Davis left Sexart, to join what became known around the world as Korn, the name was changed to Supermodel and the band moved from Bakersfield to Huntington Beach, California.

=== Adema ===
In early 2000, DeRoo joined the band Adema, replacing their first bassist Mike "Motown" Montano. Soon after the lineup change and the addition of DeRoo as bassist Adema was signed to a contract with Arista Records by then CEO and president Antonio L.A. Reid. Adema’s self-titled debut album, Adema, was released in August 2001 and was met with moderate success. Two singles from the album, "Giving In" and "The Way You Like It," received significant radio airplay and the album was certified Gold.

=== Equipment ===
Dave DeRoo is being seen with Music Man Stingray 5 string models and Schecter custom 5 string basses.

== Legal issues ==
In November 2008, DeRoo was sentenced to 45 days in jail after pleading no contest to DUI causing injury. On January 29, 2011 DeRoo was arrested moments before a performance at the Webster Theater in Hartford Connecticut and charged with being a fugitive of justice. The arrest was the result of a June 2010 warrant issued Kern County for violating probation terms set forth in his 2008 arrest. DeRoo was held on remand with bail set at $1 million and the exact violation of probation was never made public.

== Discography ==
=== Adema ===
- Adema (2001)
- Unstable (2003)
- Planets (2005)
- Kill the Headlights (2007)
- Topple the Giants (2013)

=== The Mantors ===
- Lust Muscle (2008)
- Mantando Emo (2009)

=== Sexart ===
- Cultivation ‘92 (1992)

=== Juice ===
- 97 Demo (1997)
- Beauté (1998)
