= The Great Divide (Ice Age album) =

Studio album by Ice Age
- Released: 1999
- Recorded: Summer and fall of 1998
- Genre: Progressive metal
- Length: 74:26
- Label: Magna Carta
- Producer: Jimmy Pappas

Ice Age chronology
The Great Divide (1999)	Liberation (2001)

Professional ratings
Review scores
Source	Rating
Allmusic	link

The Great Divide is the debut album by the progressive metal group Ice Age, released in 1999.

== Track listing ==
All lyrics are written by Josh Pincus except where noted; all music is composed by Ice Age

No.	Title	Length
1.	"Perpetual Child"	10:29
2.	"Sleepwalker"	5:24
3.	"Join" (Pincus, Aponte)	5:55
4.	"Spare Chicken Parts" (Instrumental)	8:50
5.	"Because of You"	5:32
6.	"The Bottom Line"	4:44
7.	"Ice Age"	11:08
8.	"One Look Away"	5:40
9.	"Miles To Go"	5:01
10.	"To Say Goodbye, Part I: Worthless Words" (Instrumental)	3:13
11.	"To Say Goodbye, Part II: On Our Way" (Pincus, Aponte)	8:18
Total length:		74:26

== Personnel ==
- Jimmy Pappas – guitars, bass on tracks 1 and 4
- Arron DiCesare – bass
- Josh Pincus – vocals and keyboards
- Hal Aponte – drums and percussion

== Notes ==
The only voice heard (not counting the chicken sound effects) on the instrumental Spare Chicken Parts is a clip from 2001: A Space Odyssey of astronaut Dave Bowman saying "Open the pod bay doors, please, Hal."
