= Yiannis Papadopoulos (guitarist) =

Greek rock fusion guitarist and composer (born 1984)

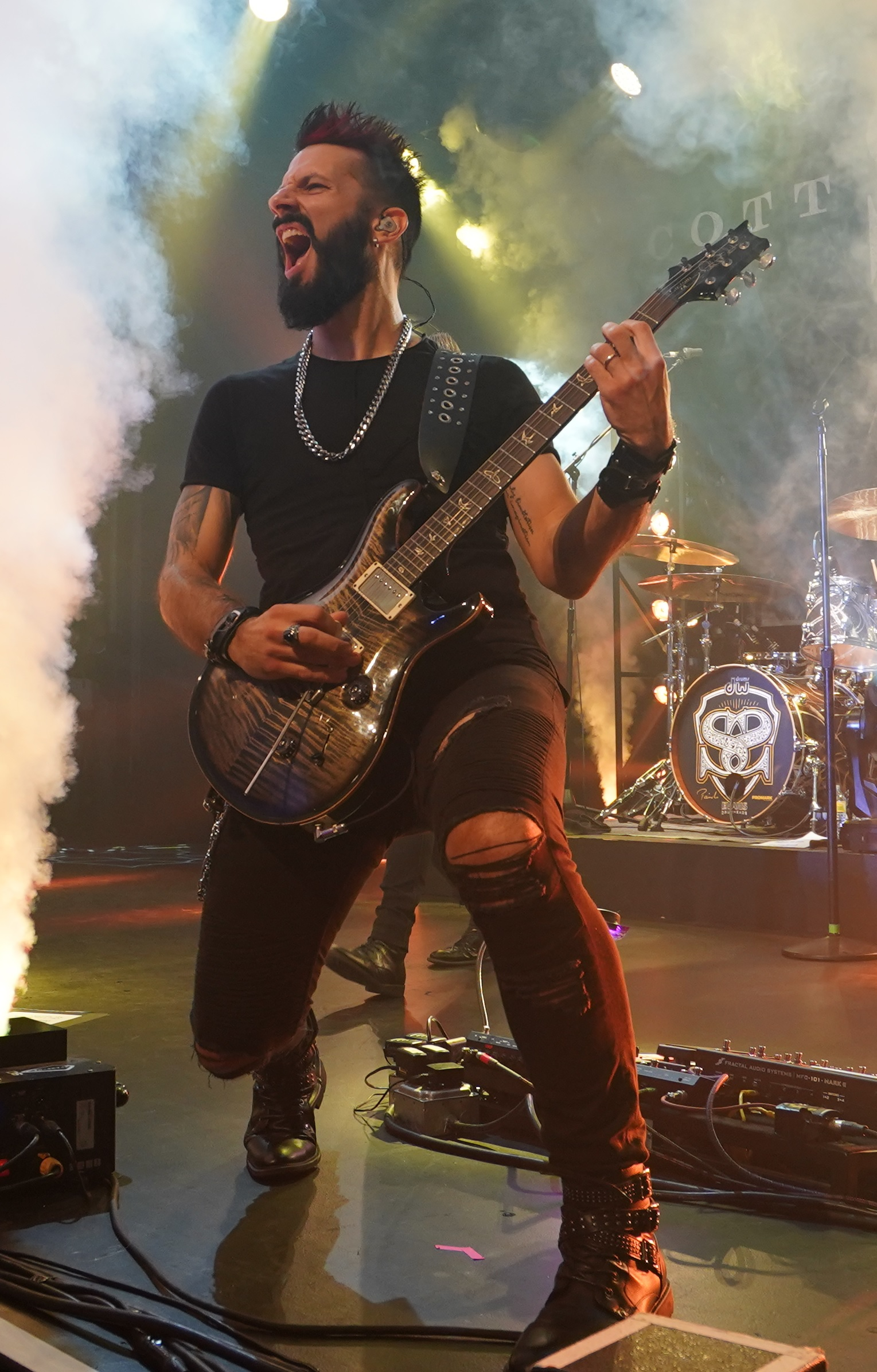
- Yiannis Papadopoulos 2019

Background information
- Born: April 5, 1984 (age 42); Athens, Greece
- Origin: Greece
- Genres: Rock; heavy metal; jazz fusion; instrumental
- Occupations: Guitarist; musician
- Instrument: Guitar
- Years active: 2005–present
- Label: Independent artist
- Website: www.yiannispapadopoulos.gr

Yiannis Papadopoulos (Γιάννης Παπαδόπουλος) (born April 5, 1984) is a Greek rock fusion guitarist, author and composer.

== Early life and education ==
Yiannis Papadopoulos was born on April 5, 1984, in Athens, Greece. He grew up in a family of musicians and he started playing the guitar at the age of four. Papadopoulos has two bachelor's degrees, one in Accounting and Finance by the Athens University of Economics and Business and the other in Financial Economics by the University of Skövde. He also holds a Degree with honours in guitar, harmony and counterpoint.

== Career ==
Papadopoulos has won a number of international Guitar Contests including the Ibanez Guitar Solo Competition 2013, the Andy James Dream Rig Competition and was one of the live finalists of Guitar Idol 4.

In 2015 he joined the American rock singer Scott Stapp, the lead vocalist of the rock band Creed, as his lead guitarist and they have been touring in the US and around the world. In 2019 Stapp released a new solo album, The Space Between the Shadows, which features Papadopoulos on guitar.

In 2018 he joined the Kamerata orchestra (Armonia Atenea) as lead guitar to perform the Concerto for Group and Orchestra by Jon Lord (Deep Purple).

In 2024 he released an album with Royal Time Machine, a prog/rock experimental trio, featuring Yiannis Papadopoulos on guitar, Michael Evdemon on the bass and George Kollias on the drums

In 2024 Scott Stapp released his fourth personal album Higher Power featuring Papadopoulos on three tracks "What I Deserve", "Dancing in the Rain" and "Quicksand", and he co-composed the first two. Also, he recorded guitars for most of the tracks on the album.

== Discography ==
- Royal Time Machine - Royal Time Machine (2024)

As featured artist

- Dawn Of Dreams – "Angel Eyes" (2012)
- George Kollias (drummer) – Invictus on tracks "The Passage" (2014) and "Through empty eyes of light" (2014)
- John Kiernan – "Fury Of The Storm" (2015)
- I Legion – "Pleiona" (2015) on tracks "Grieving" and "Pleiona" (2015)
- FB1964 – "When the last bell dies" (2017)
- Daniel Rochon – "What Have I Done" & "Unforgivable" (2018), "Light Me The Way" & "Hiding" (2019)
- Scott Stapp – "Higher Power" (2024) on tracks "What I Deserve", "Quicksand", and "Dancing in the Rain" (2024)

== Books and publications ==
- The Electric Guitar Technique Workout (2013 Edition 1 & 2016 Edition 2)
- Fretboard Concepts (2019)

In March 2014 Papadopoulos published his first book regarding technique, The Electric Guitar Technique Workout and in 2016 a second edition of the book was published. In April 2019 he published his second book, Fretboard Concepts which is about Scales/Chords/Arpeggios/Theory/Harmony and improvisation Techniques.

== Instructional Packages ==
Releases with Jamtrackcentral

- The 20 Prominent metal licks (2015)
- Nightflower (2017)
