= Scott Stapp =

American singer, lead vocalist of Creed

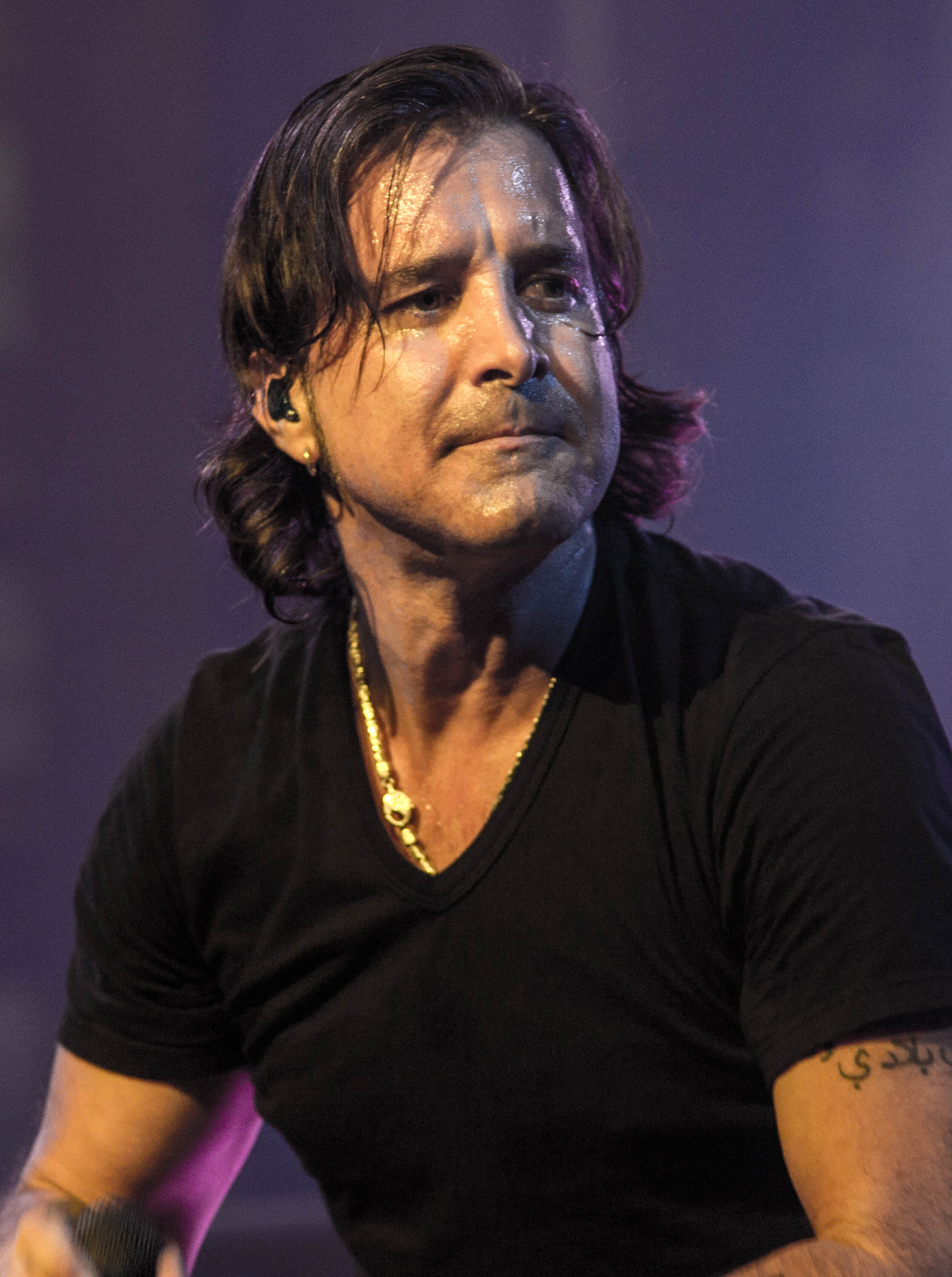
- Stapp in 2016

Background information
- Born: Anthony Scott Flippen; August 8, 1973 (age 53); Orlando, Florida, U.S.
- Genres: Post-grunge; hard rock; alternative rock; alternative metal
- Occupations: Singer; songwriter
- Years active: 1994–present
- Label: Napalm
- Member of: Creed
- Formerly of: Art of Anarchy
- Spouses: Hillaree Burns (m. 1997; div. 1998) Jaclyn Nesheiwat (m. 2006)
- Website: scottstapp.com

Scott Anthony Stapp (born Anthony Scott Flippen; August 8, 1973) is an American singer and songwriter best known as the lead vocalist of the rock band Creed. He has also fronted Art of Anarchy and has released four solo albums.

Stapp has received several accolades, including numerous RIAA certifications. Stapp and Creed bandmate Mark Tremonti won a Grammy Award for Best Rock Song in 2001 as the writers of the Creed song "With Arms Wide Open". In 2006, Hit Parader ranked Stapp as the 68th-greatest heavy metal vocalist.

== Early life and education ==
Stapp was born Anthony Scott Flippen on August 8, 1973, in Orlando, Florida. He was raised by his mother, Lynda, and his stepfather, Steven Stapp, a dentist, whose surname he took. Artists that influenced him to pursue a music career includes Elvis Presley, U2, Def Leppard, and the Doors. He was influenced by Elvis Presley due to his mother being a big fan and got into the school choir by singing Elvis songs. His first ever performance was when he was nine years old, singing "Yesterday" by the Beatles at Bear Lake Elementary School in the auditorium. He graduated from Lake Highland Preparatory School.

Stapp stated in his memoir that his maternal grandfather was of Cherokee ancestry.

== Career ==
=== Creed ===
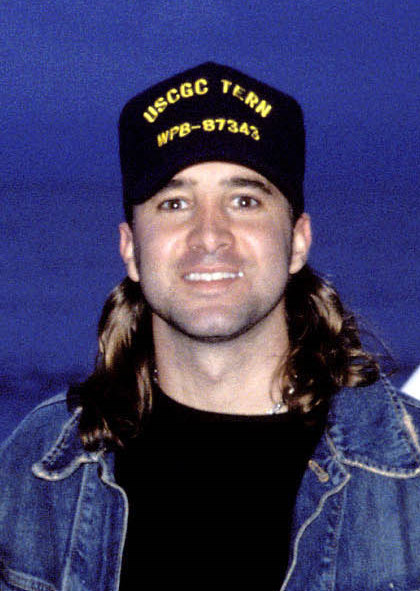
Stapp in 2002

Stapp was a founding member and the original lead vocalist of American rock band Creed. After meeting his future bandmate Mark Tremonti at Lake Highland Preparatory School in Orlando, Florida, Stapp reunited with Tremonti while both attended Florida State University. The two quickly developed a friendship based on their mutual passion for music. Stapp formed Creed with Tremonti in 1994, with fellow members Brian Marshall and Scott Phillips joining as bassist and drummer, respectively.

The band released its debut album My Own Prison in 1997 to mainstream success, selling over six million copies. Four singles were released from the album: "My Own Prison", "Torn", "What's This Life For", and "One". All four singles reached the Top Three on Billboard's Hot Mainstream Rock Tracks chart. The album was followed in 1999 by Human Clay, which was an immediate success and certified diamond and eleven times platinum by the RIAA.

The band released another multi-platinum selling album, Weathered, in 2001. The tour to support this record was overwhelmingly successful but ended with a controversial concert in Chicago. This concert ultimately led to the band's breakup.

In 2004, Creed announced that it had disbanded, citing tension between Stapp and the other members. Creed released its Greatest Hits album in November 2004.

In 2009, it was announced that Creed had reunited. The band's fourth record, Full Circle, was released in October 2009. Creed supported the album by touring throughout North and South America, Europe, and Australia during the summers of 2009 and 2010.

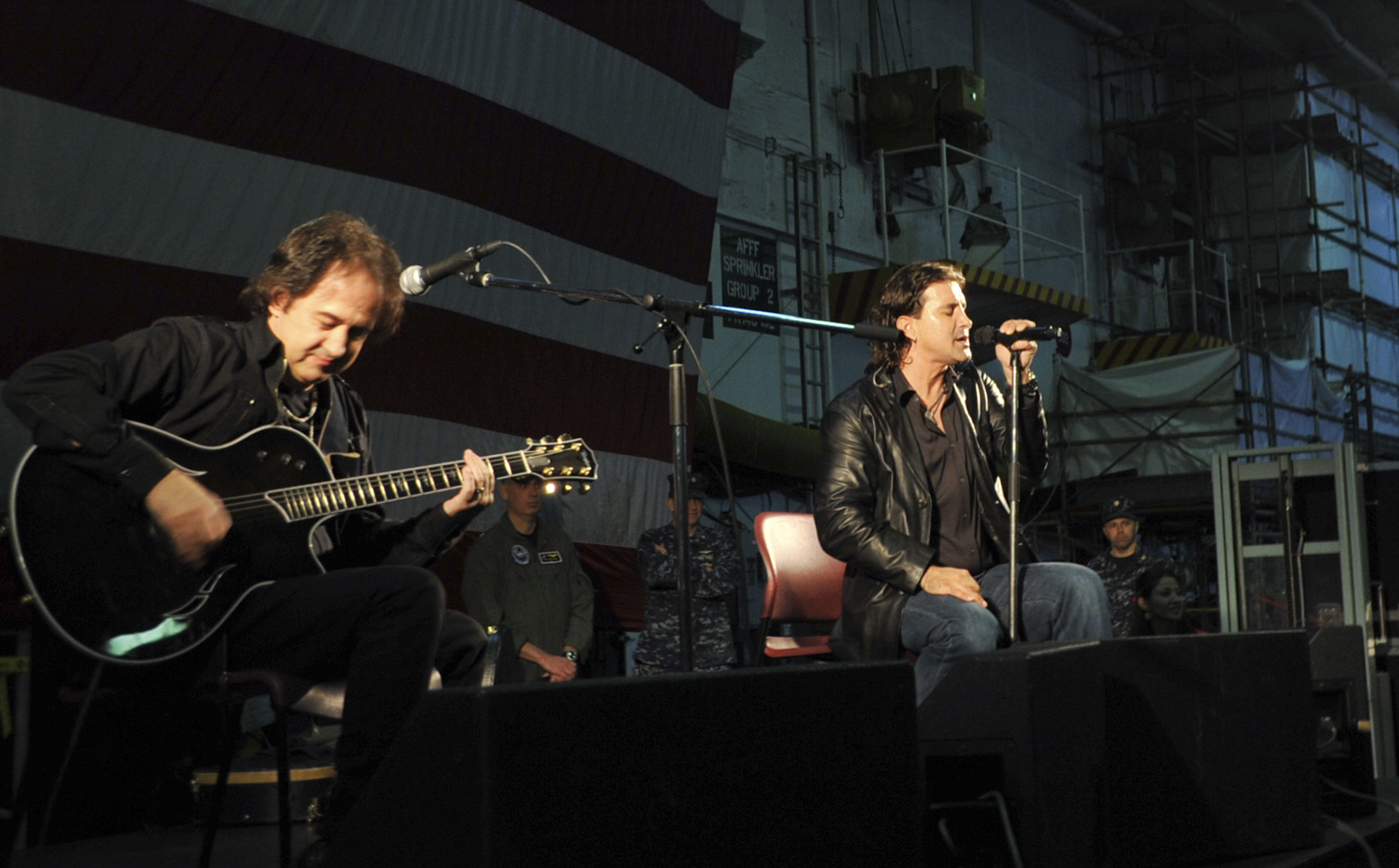
Stapp performing with guitarist Brent Look in 2012

In March 2012, Stapp reconvened with his Creed bandmates to rehearse for their "2 Nights" tour, during which the band performed its first two albums, My Own Prison and Human Clay, back to back in their entirety. It was announced that Stapp and Mark Tremonti would enter the studio to start recording new songs in June, but no progress was made. In October 2013, Stapp noted in an interview that extensive work was done on the new album throughout 2011 and 2012. However, the project was suddenly abandoned, and Stapp stated he was unaware of the reason. Stapp also hinted that the relationship between himself and Tremonti had once again broken down, leaving the future of the band uncertain. Mark Tremonti said that his relationship with Stapp went south during the reunion tour when Stapp indicated that he thought Mark would end Alter Bridge to focus solely on Creed, which Mark was not willing to do under any circumstance.

In 2014, Stapp maintained that the band was still together.

On July 17, 2023, Creed announced they would reunite for their first shows in 12 years in 2024, when they set sail the "Summer of '99" cruise in April 2024 as headliners of the rock voyage.

=== Solo career and contributions: 2004–present ===
After Creed announced its breakup in 2004, Stapp recorded the song "Relearn Love" with 7 Aurelius and The Tea Party for the album The Passion of the Christ: Songs, a collection of tracks inspired by the 2004 Mel Gibson film The Passion of the Christ. He then began working on his debut solo album. Titled The Great Divide, the record was released in the U.S. on November 22, 2005, peaking at No. 19 on the Billboard 200. "The Great Divide", "Justify", and "Surround Me" were released as singles. The album was certified platinum on December 14, 2005. The Great Divide has since reached double platinum.

Stapp was ranked as the 68th greatest heavy metal vocalist of all time by Hit Parader in 2006.

On August 18, 2010, Stapp wrote: "I'm stripping down all the Creed hits, as well as my solo material, in a manner fans have never heard before but have long been screaming for." Creed's touring rhythm guitarist Eric Friedman joined Stapp on the acoustic tour. The short solo acoustic tour began September 28, 2010, and concluded November 20, 2010.

In the spring of 2010, Stapp recorded an anthem for the National League baseball team the Florida Marlins entitled "Marlins Will Soar". The song was a rewrite of Stapp's song "You Will Soar," using different lyrics and a slightly different melody in the verses. According to The Huffington Post, "Marlins Will Soar" was met with extremely negative reviews.

Stapp appeared on Carlos Santana's solo album Guitar Heaven: The Greatest Guitar Classics of All Time, a cover album on which Stapp sings on the cover of the Creedence Clearwater Revival song "Fortunate Son". The album was released on September 21, 2010.

Stapp confirmed in 2010 that his next solo album would be devoted to the topics of lust and love. Eleven tracks from the album were recorded in late 2010. The album was later shelved indefinitely. A song from this unreleased album, "A Prayer for Sunrise", was released in 2012 to promote Stapp's autobiography.

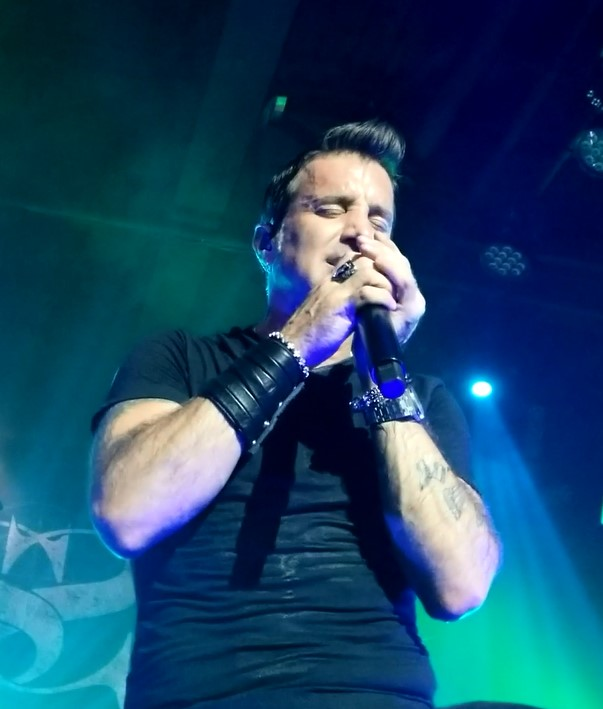
Stapp performing during his The Space Between the Shadows tour in 2019

In 2013, Stapp released his second solo album, Proof of Life. On October 8, 2013, the song "Slow Suicide" went to radio.

On March 22, 2019, Stapp released the single "Purpose for Pain". His album The Space Between the Shadows was released on July 19, 2019. Stapp began touring in support of the album in June 2019. In mid-2019, Stapp planned to tour the United States with American rock band Messer.

In 2021, Stapp collaborated with electronic dance music artists Wooli and Trivecta on their song "Light Up The Sky", which was released on Ophelia Records.

=== Art of Anarchy: 2016–2018 ===
On May 3, 2016, Stapp announced that he would replace Scott Weiland (who died on December 3, 2015) as the lead singer of Art of Anarchy. "The Madness", the band's first single with Stapp as lead singer, was released in August 2016. The band released its second album (and first with Stapp), also called The Madness, on March 24, 2017. The album has received critical accolades. The album also received a 10/10 rating from Amps and Green Screens.

In February 2018, it was reported that Stapp was being sued by Art of Anarchy for allegedly refusing to promote The Madness or tour in support of the album, having breached contractual obligations in the process.

=== Acting ===
In December 2020, it was announced that Stapp would portray Frank Sinatra in a biopic film based on the life of U.S. President Ronald Reagan.

== Artistry ==
Stapp is most widely known for his deep, raspy voice and baritone vocal range, as well as for his "dramatic vocal delivery" and the way he enunciates his vowels. His vocals have frequently drawn comparisons to those of Eddie Vedder of Pearl Jam. AllMusic characterized Stapp's singing and performance style as "returning rock to its roots with his guttural growls and theatrical rock star moves." Stapp has self-described his vocals as "over-the-top" and has stated that they have received mockery from his own children in addition to music critics: "It’s funny to hear how other people hear you. Cause I never heard myself with this over-the-top stuff, but I guess that’s the caricature voice of me and it’s funny, man. I’m all about picking on myself. It’s all good man." Examples of themes explored in Stapp's lyrics include healing, redemption and salvation. His lyrics have also explored topics such as heaven in Christianity, religious faith, frustration and grief.

Stapp has stated he believes the pop music sensbility present in his songwriting can be attributed to the influence of English rock band Def Leppard, stating that listeners "might not hear their sound, but the way they craft their songs rubbed off on me." He also credited Irish rock band U2 as an influence on his choruses, and has cited frontman Bono specifically as a profound inspiration. He has additionally cited songs from albums by the Beatles, AC/DC, the Doors, Pink Floyd, the Rolling Stones and Led Zeppelin as having had an impact on shaping him artistically. He stated that for the most part, individual songs were more crucial to him than albums in their entirety. He has further cited Mick Jagger and Jim Morrison as having influenced the "attitude and ego" that he injects into his live performances.

Stapp was also known for making "really deep, direct eye contact" with the camera in Creed's earlier music videos, according to Loudwire.

== Philanthropy ==
In 2000, Stapp founded the With Arms Wide Open Foundation, a nonprofit organization "dedicated to helping underprivileged children and families around the world." The foundation has donated over $1 million to various causes.

In early 2012, to promote fundraising for victims of the 2011 Tōhoku earthquake and tsunami, Stapp and his wife, in cooperation with the U.S. Embassy in Tokyo, IsraAid, the U.S. Armed Forces, and the United Service Organizations, traveled to Japan and visited with victims of the tsunami in affected towns including Sendai and Ishinomaki along Japan's northeast coastline. Stapp also performed an acoustic show on board the USS George Washington at the Yokosuka Naval Base for U.S. troops stationed in Japan to thank and express his appreciation for them.

== Personal life ==
Stapp is a Christian. "I would feel a connection with God when I wrote the words and then when I would sing the songs, learning the songs, I would feel the Holy Spirit," confirmed Stapp in a 2013 interview. He wrote a memoir, Sinner's Creed, which was released by Tyndale House on October 2, 2012. In a podcast interview with Theo Von, he claimed that his parents would physically abuse him "in the name of God", and that he would live his life "on a timer", having to finish certain activities by a certain time to avoid further punishment.

In 2003, Stapp contemplated suicide after drinking a bottle of Jack Daniel's whiskey. He retrieved two MP5s from his collection and put the guns to his head, but did not pull the triggers after looking at a picture of his son, Jagger. He later said he had been convinced that anyone involved with Creed wanted him dead so he would become a "Kurt Cobain martyr-type" and increase record sales. He later said that instead of killing himself, he fired a few rounds in his home. He said, "I was in the throes of prednisone coming out of my body [...] I shot a few rounds off and instantly was like, 'What the hell am I doing?' So I put the guns away and ran out to the garage and got the putty and patched the holes."

Stapp has said he attempted suicide in Miami in 2006. According to Stapp, he jumped over a balcony and fell 40 feet (12 m), fracturing his skull and breaking his hip and nose. He credited rapper T.I. with saving his life, stating, "I laid out there for two and a half hours and my guardian angel showed up. He immediately took care of the situation and saved my life." T.I. confirmed the incident, although he did not know who Stapp was at the time.

=== Family ===
In 1997, Stapp married Hillaree Burns. They were married for 16 months and divorced in 1998. Stapp has a son, Jagger, with Burns. After the couple's divorce, Stapp retained full custody of Jagger.

On February 11, 2006, Stapp married 2004 Miss New York USA winner and model Jaclyn Nesheiwat. Together they have a daughter and a son. In November 2014, Jaclyn filed for divorce. The couple eventually sought help and continued together. The couple had their third child, a son, in November 2017. In May 2023, Stapp reportedly filed for divorce 11 months after a divorce, which was originally filed by Jaclyn, was withdrawn. According to a source, he and Jaclyn knew the marriage was falling apart but continued to try to make it work. The divorce has yet to be finalized. Stapp lives in Franklin, Tennessee with his family.

=== Legal issues ===
On February 13, 2006, Stapp was arrested for alleged public intoxication while attempting to board a flight in Los Angeles International Airport, after blowing a .18 on a breathalyzer test. He had just been married one day prior and was attempting to travel for his honeymoon. On March 11, it was reported that no charges were to be filed against Stapp in the incident.

On May 20, 2007, Stapp was charged with one count of felony assault stemming from a domestic violence incident; the judge reduced the charge to misdemeanor assault after determining that the glass bottle thrown was not a deadly weapon. Stapp was later set free on supervised release. Stapp apologized to his wife and the public on May 23, 2007, and the charge was later dropped.

=== 1999 Kid Rock sex tape ===
On February 16 2006, only three days after Stapp was arrested for public intoxication and four days after he was married, news outlets reported that a 1999 sex tape of Stapp and fellow American musician Kid Rock engaged in activity of a sexual nature with four female fans on a tour bus had been acquired by the American pornographic film studio Red Light District Video, which was previously responsible for distributing a sex tape of Paris Hilton. The company reportedly posted a 40-second preview of the film to the internet and said they intended to eventually release the full 45-minute version.

Stapp asserted that the video was stolen, and took steps to prevent its release. He also contended that there were no actual acts of sexual intercourse apparent on the tape, and that his actions had been "mischaracterized". A woman claiming to be one of the women featured in the video filed an invasion of privacy lawsuit against Stapp, but this case was dismissed. Later in the month, a US District Court judge blocked the release of the video. Stapp, along with Kid Rock, hired attorneys and filed lawsuits against Red Light Video. Stapp sought damages from Red Light District, but the case was settled in 2007.

The video was ultimately never released. Stapp stated that the incident strained his friendship with Kid Rock, and expressed regret for not destroying the video, having believed it would never go public. Reflecting on the incident in 2009, he told Spin: "What sucks about that is Bob — Kid Rock — and I were friends. He'd been over to my house and we jammed and hung out. We were in Tampa playing with Metallica, and I walked into his trailer and there were some strippers. It's a time in his life and a time in my life that we'd like to put behind us and not publicize because we have children now, and they're in school, and their friends read. I know he was pretty pissed off at me when that came out." Stapp stated that although he had personally apologized to Kid Rock for his role in the incident, the two had not spoken in person since it occurred.

=== 2014 psychotic break ===
On November 26, 2014, Stapp posted a video to Facebook from a Holiday Inn claiming he was completely bankrupt and homeless and was living out of his truck after all of his money had disappeared from his bank account. He also claimed the IRS had frozen his bank accounts and did not expect to resolve the issue in the near future, while publicly denying rumors of a relapse. Additionally, he claimed his wife had been making attempts to have him committed to a psychiatric facility. The video also came following a death hoax that circulated about him earlier in the month. He posted two additional videos the following day on Thanksgiving. All three videos were removed before Stapp would ultimately publish a written statement on his situation.

He had previously been placed on psychiatric hold for a 72-hour period on November 13 after being found on the side of the road by authorities, who recounted that Stapp was claiming to hear voices and was expressing belief that someone was attempting to poison him, and that the Salafi jihadist militant organization ISIS was going to attack his family. On December 12, it was reported that Stapp's family had accused him of plotting to assassinate US President Barrack Obama. His wife told a dispatcher that he had printed off hundreds of pages of CIA documents from the internet, stuffed them in a bag, and departed on a bicycle. Stapp was reportedly visited and investigated by United States Secret Service agents as a precaution due to these suspicions. He recalled the encounter: "It’s just surreal that it played out that far. They sit down, ask you a bunch of questions and determine whether you’re a threat – I wasn’t."

On December 16, audio of a 911 call made by Stapp surfaced on the internet, in which Stapp can be heard telling dispatchers that he had abandoned his vehicle along the highway after running out of gas and had been running from pursuers who were attempting to kill him for "about six or seven weeks". He said there were fifteen vehicles pursuing him. He later claimed that he spent an entire month driving around the United States following an angel that he believed he saw on the hood of his vehicle. He later explained that he was under the impression the core of the terrorist group's leadership was within his own family, and told the dean of his son's school that a terrorist attack in Florida was eminent. He also said he believed that the funds that had disappeared from his bank account had been used to fund terrorism. He also attempted to report that his vehicle had been stolen by his wife, though the dispatcher informed him that since the vehicle was taken by his spouse it did not constitute a theft. There were four released 911 recordings in total.

He later admitted he believed he was a CIA operative who had been given the assignment to assassinate Obama. He said he felt "lucky to be alive" following the psychotic break. He concluded to People the following year: "All of it was nonsense. I was out of my mind." He also revealed that he had been diagnosed with bipolar disorder. He commented that the diagnosis was a relief, because "finally, we had an answer" about the reasons for his mental health difficulties. In the same interview, Stapp indicated that he was sober, taking medication, and working through a 12-step program. He later blamed the incident on a bad interaction between antidepressants and a drug that was not prescribed to him. He also stated that alcohol was involved. He also appeared on the American reality television series Couples Therapy that year. He recounted to Rolling Stone: "We had no background in anything like this, so it was all very new. And after multiple conversations, they really laid it out and showed us it was authentic and that Dr. Jenn was really passionate and serious about what she did. We ultimately figured that since my breakdown was so public, we should continue this journey publicly."

== Solo discography ==
=== Studio albums ===
Year	Album details	Peak positions	Certifications (sales thresholds)
Year	Album details	US	Certifications (sales thresholds)
2005	The Great Divide: Released: November 22, 2005; Label: Wind-up	19	RIAA: Platinum
2013	Proof of Life: Released: November 5, 2013; Label: Wind-up	37	
2019	The Space Between the Shadows: Released: July 19, 2019; Label: Napalm	137	
2024	Higher Power: Released: March 15, 2024; Label: Napalm	— (Note: Higher Power did not enter the Billboard 200, but peaked at number 32 on the Top Album Sales chart.)	

=== Live albums ===
Year	Album details
2017	Live and Unplugged (Note: Stapp partnered with DiscLive to release a set of individually numbered live recordings, one for each of his 2017 Live and Unplugged tour dates.): Released: 2017; Label: DiscLive Network

=== Singles ===
List of singles, with selected chart positions
Year	Title	Peak chart positions					Album
Year	Title	US Main. Rock	US Rock Air.	US Adult Top 40	US Chr. Rock	AUS	Album
2004	"Relearn Love"	—	—	—	—	—	The Passion of the Christ: Songs
2005	"The Great Divide"	20	—	24	—	91	The Great Divide
2006	"Justify"	—	—	—	—	—	The Great Divide
2006	"Surround Me"	—	—	—	—	—	The Great Divide
2013	"Slow Suicide"	38	—	—	1	—	Proof of Life
2014	"Dying to Live"	—	—	—	—	—	Proof of Life
2014	"Break Out"	—	—	—	—	—	Proof of Life
2015	"Proof of Life"	—	—	—	2	—	Proof of Life
2015	"Only One"	—	—	—	—	—	Proof of Life
2019	"Purpose for Pain"	23	—	—	—	—	The Space Between the Shadows
2019	"Name"	39	—	—	—	—	The Space Between the Shadows
2019	"Face of the Sun"	—	—	—	—	—	The Space Between the Shadows
2019	"Gone Too Soon"	—	—	—	—	—	The Space Between the Shadows
2020	"Survivor"	24	—	—	—	—	The Space Between the Shadows
2021	"Light Up The Sky" (with Wooli and Trivecta)	—	—	—	—	—	Non-album single
2023	"Higher Power"	10	22	—	—	—	Higher Power
2023	"What I Deserve" (featuring Yiannis Papadopoulos)	—	—	—	—	—	Higher Power
2023	"Black Butterfly"	5	16	—	—	—	Higher Power
2024	"Deadman's Trigger"	9	33	—	—	—	Higher Power
2024	"If These Walls Could Talk" (featuring Dorothy)	—	—	—	—	—	Higher Power
"—" denotes a recording that did not chart or was not released.

=== Music videos ===
Year	Song	Director
2005	"The Great Divide"	Unknown
2013	"Slow Suicide"	Unknown
2019	"Purpose for Pain"	Unknown
2024	"If These Walls Could Talk"	Nick Peterson
2025	"Deadman's Trigger"	Tyler Dunning Evans

== Tours ==
- Creed Tours 1994–2002
- The Great Divide Tour (2006–2007)
- 2010 Unplugged Tour
- 2011–2012 Tours
- Proof of Life Tour 2014
- Proof of Life Tour 2016
- Make America Rock Again Tour (headlining) (2017)
- Live & Unplugged Tour (2017)
- Summer Tour 2018
- The Space Between the Shadows Tour (2019)
- Creed - The Summer of '99 Tour (2024)
