= Kill the Headlights =

Studio album by Adema
- Released: August 21, 2007
- Recorded: 2007 in Los Angeles, California
- Genre: Alternative metal, nu metal, post-grunge
- Length: 40:04
- Label: Immortal/Adema Partnership/Tiefdruck Musik (Europe)
- Producer: Marshall Altman

Adema chronology
| Planets (2005) | Kill the Headlights (2007) | Topple the Giants (2013) |

Singles from Kill the Headlights
- 1. "Cold and Jaded" Released: January 15, 2007; 2. "Brand New Thing" Released: May 7, 2007; 3. "All These Years" Released: 2008

Kill the Headlights is the fourth studio album by Adema. It was released on August 21, 2007 by Immortal Records and is the only album to feature vocalist Bobby Reeves, and guitarist Ed Faris, from the Los Angeles nu metal band LeVeL. The album is the band's first not to debut on the Billboard 200 charts. It registered first weeks sales of approximately 2,000 copies.

== Track listing ==
| No. | Title | Length |
|---|---|---|
| 1. | "Cold and Jaded" | 3:35 |
| 2. | "Brand New Thing" | 3:43 |
| 3. | "Open Till Midnight" | 3:46 |
| 4. | "Waiting for Daylight" | 3:01 |
| 5. | "Days Go By" | 3:57 |
| 6. | "Prelude" | 0:33 |
| 7. | "All These Years" | 3:05 |
| 8. | "What Doesn't Kill Us" | 3:37 |
| 9. | "Invisible" | 4:00 |
| 10. | "Black Clouds" | 3:32 |
| 11. | "Los Angeles" | 3:38 |
| 12. | "The Losers (Warrior Soul Cover)" | 3:32 |

=== Other songs recorded ===
- "Human Nature"
- "Somethin' Better" (Elements of it would later be used in "Waiting for Daylight")
- "Out Alive"
- "Los Angeles" (Demo)
- "Human Nature" (Team Cybergeist Version)

== Personnel ==
=== Adema ===
- Bobby Reeves – lead vocals
- Tim Fluckey – lead guitar, backing vocals
- Ed Faris – rhythm guitar, keyboards, synthesizers, programming
- Dave DeRoo – bass guitar, backing vocals
- Kris Kohls – drums, percussion

=== Production ===
- Produced & Arranged by Marshall Altman
- Mixed by Eric Robinson & Marshall Altman
- Recorded by Marshall Altman, Ryan Williams, & Ed Faris
- Recorded at:
  - The Galt Line Studios – Burbank, CA
    - Assistant: Marcus Samperio
  - Ed Faris Studio 8
- Mastered by Eddy Schreyer at Oasis Mastering
- A&R: Jamie Talbot
- Management: Kevin Lee for Union Entertainment Group, Inc.
- Legal: Bryan Christner
- Business Management: Laurand Management/ Henry Schiffer, CPA
- Publicity: Alex Ross for Supreme Entertainment
- Photography: Alex Solca
- Sales: Yuri Dutton
- New Media: Jay Fisher
- Artwork: I. Rentz
