= The Passion of the Christ: Songs =

2004 compilation album by various artists

Compilation album by Various artists
- Released: August 31, 2004
- Genre: Contemporary Christian music
- Length: 51:11
- Label: Lost Keyword

Various artists chronology
The Passion of the Christ: Songs Inspired By (2004)	The Passion of the Christ: Songs (2004)

Professional ratings
Review scores
Source	Rating
AllMusic	2.5/5 stars

The Passion of the Christ: Songs is an album of songs inspired by the 2004 film The Passion of the Christ. It was produced by Mark Joseph and Tim Cook, and executive-produced by Mel Gibson. It won the 2005 GMA Music Award for Special Event Album of the Year.

== Track listing ==
No.	Title	Length
1.	"I See Love" (Third Day, Steven Curtis Chapman, MercyMe)	4:12
2.	"Relearn Love" (Scott Stapp)	4:00
3.	"Truly Amazing" (P.O.D.)	3:03
4.	"New Again" (Brad Paisley, Sara Evans)	6:22
5.	"Rainy Day" (Big Dismal)	4:22
6.	"The Passion" (Lauryn Hill)	5:47
7.	"How Many Lashes" (Kirk Franklin, Yolanda Adams)	4:26
8.	"The Empire" (MxPx, Mark Hoppus)	3:48
9.	"Finding My Own Way" (Charlotte Church)	4:01
10.	"Miracle of Love" (BeBe Winans, Angie Stone)	3:52
11.	"To Give Love" (Dan Lavery)	3:48
12.	"Reason I Live" (Big Dismal)	3:30
Total length:		51:11

== Awards ==
In 2005, the album won a Dove Award for Special Event Album of the Year at the 36th GMA Dove Awards.
