= Across the Great Divide =

Across the Great Divide may refer to:

- Across the Great Divide (film), starring Robert Logan, Heather Rattray, and Mark Edward Hall
- Across the Great Divide (album), a 1994 album box set by the Band
  - Across the Great Divide (song), a song by the Band
  - Across the Great Divide: the Band and America, a book (Hyperion, 1994) by Barney Hoskyns about the members and career of the Band ISBN 978-0786880270
- Across the Great Divide (Kate Wolf), a song by Kate Wolf, covered by many others artists, including Nanci Griffith and Kyle Carey
- Across the Great Divide tour, an Australian tour by Powderfinger and Silverchair
  - Across the Great Divide Tour (DVD), a DVD by Powderfinger and Silverchair featuring live performances from the tour
