= Adema =

American rock band

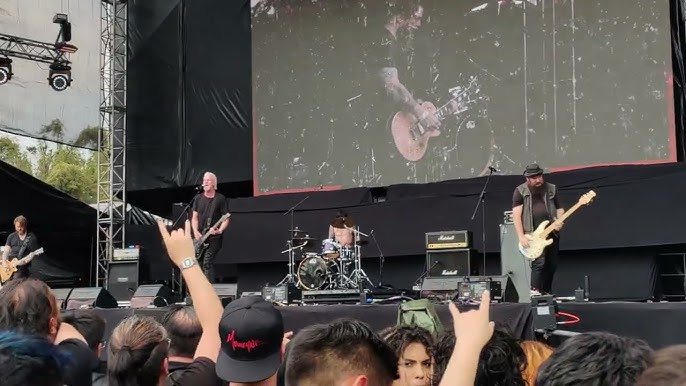
- Adema performing at Mexico City in 2024

Background information
- Origin: Bakersfield, California, U.S.
- Genres: Nu metal; alternative metal; post-grunge; alternative rock; hard rock
- Years active: 2000–present (hiatus: 2008–2009)
- Labels: Arista; Earache; Immortal; Legacy; Pavement; Cleopatra
- Members: Tim Fluckey; Mike Ransom; Dave DeRoo
- Past members: Ryan Shuck; Luke Caraccioli; Bobby Reeves; Ed Faris; Mark Chavez; Kris Kohls

Adema (IPA: /əˈdiːmə/) is an American rock band from Bakersfield, California. The band formed in 2000 with members vocalist Mark Chavez, guitarist Tim Fluckey, guitarist Mike Ransom, bassist Dave DeRoo, and drummer Kris Kohls. After their first two albums, Adema, and Unstable, the band was plagued with years of conflict and lineup changes. Ransom left the band in 2003 followed by Chavez later in 2004 due to conflicts between themselves and other members of the band. Luke Caraccioli replaced Chavez in early 2005 for one album, Planets, but then left a few months later in late 2005. Vocalist Bobby Reeves and guitarist Ed Faris, both from the band Level, were recruited to join as well, but only released one album, Kill the Headlights in 2007, before entering a hiatus. The band's original lineup reformed in late 2009 and toured, but both Ransom and Chavez left again before any new music would be recorded. Fluckey took over lead vocals from 2011 to 2017. The lineup released an EP, Topple the Giants. In 2013 Ransom returned once again; Chavez rejoined the band again in March 2017, only to leave again in 2019. He was replaced by Ryan Shuck. The band continued performing with Shuck, releasing two singles and a three song EP until February 2024 when Shuck departed from the band.

In 2013, the band was featured in an NME article titled "28 Nu-Metal Era Bands You Probably Forgot All About".

== History ==
=== 2000–2002: Formation and first release ===
Before Adema, lead vocalist Mark Chavez, half-brother of Korn's lead vocalist, Jonathan Davis, played guitar for B.P.D. (Big, Powerful, and Dangerous), guitarist Tim Fluckey formerly played with Juice along with bassist Dave DeRoo, who previously played with Sexart along with Orgy guitarist Ryan Shuck and Jonathan Davis, guitarist Mike Ransom played with associated local bands in the same scene, and drummer Kris Kohls formerly played with Cradle of Thorns/Videodrone (who were previously signed to Korn's Elementree Records). The association of Chavez and Kohls to Korn sparked a major label bidding war; ultimately, the band signed to Arista Records in a three-album deal in October 2000. Chavez said that the band's decision to sign with Arista was partially influenced by their belief that the label's president, L.A. Reid, was "more of a music man than a corporate fuck."

The band's eponymous debut album, Adema, was released in August 2001 to moderate success. It sold 46,800 copies in its first week of release to debut and peak at number 27 on the Billboard 200 chart. Its two major singles, "Giving In" and "The Way You Like It," received significant airplay on rock radio. All of the lyrics were written by Chavez, and the album was produced by Bill Appleberry (7th House) and Tobi Miller (The Wallflowers guitarist). Adema's eponymous debut album was certified gold, and the band received a spot on the main stage during the Ozzfest tour. They kept playing live with the Music as a Weapon, SnoCore Rock, and Projekt Revolution tours. By September 2004, the album had sold 671,000 copies in the United States, according to Nielsen SoundScan.

In 2002, Adema released Insomniac's Dream, an EP, as a "gift to fans." The single from the album, "Immortal," was written for the video game Mortal Kombat: Deadly Alliance. Besides the single, it included a track from international versions of Adema, a cover to Alice in Chains's "Nutshell", and four remix versions of songs from Adema. 2002 also marked Adema's inclusion in the Resident Evil Soundtrack, contributing the track "Everyone" from their debut album.

=== 2003–2004: Unstable and lineup changes ===
Adema's second album, Unstable, was released by Arista in August 2003. It was produced by Howard Benson, whose credits also include producing albums with P.O.D., Hoobastank, Cold and most famously, for his work with post hardcore band Saosin.

The band has vigorously fought the label "nu metal," preferring to be classified as traditional rock. While Unstable was not a significant break from their earlier sound, Chavez compared it to the rawness of Nirvana, and bassist DeRoo hoped that Chavez's stronger voice (the result of voice lessons) would result in a more mainstream sound. "We don't go onstage and nu metal," said drummer Kohls. "We're sick of that phrase. ROCK – it's such a broad word that it doesn't categorize you."

Chavez and guitarist Ransom had a bitter rivalry that ended when first Ransom, then Chavez, left the band. During 2003, when the band released and toured for Unstable, Chavez and Ransom didn't speak to one another. The band claimed that the split was no surprise. Ransom left in December, while the remaining four members finished touring.

Amidst this conflict, Unstable sold over 66% less than the band's debut album. In December, the band learned that Arista was dropping them during a label merger. A large number of Arista's staff was fired in a management shakeup by its parent company, Sony. L.A. Reid, who originally signed the band, had left the label a week earlier. The band has blamed low sales of Unstable on being dropped.

The band continued to write, but in February 2004, Chavez started to lose interest. He quit the band in September.

With regards to the split with Adema, Adema blamed the split on Chavez's disinterest in the band. However, Chavez acknowledged personal problems and claimed that "it takes two to tango," and that his decision precipitated from an argument with drummer Kohls over the direction of the band. Chavez would form the band Midnight Panic with his cousin and old bandmates Cesareo Garasa and Mike Montano, which released Midnight Panic album before dissolving.

=== 2004–2005: Planets with Luke Caraccioli ===
The remaining three Adema members regrouped to write new music and auditioned for a new lead singer. After Kohls heard a demo from Rewind Yesterday, another Bakersfield band, he was impressed by the group's lead singer, Luke Caraccioli. Adema asked Caraccioli to front the band. Luke Caraccioli accepted a few months later in January 2005.

Adema signed to metal label Earache Records in Spring 2004 when its manager, Al Dawson, heard them at a show. Under their new label, the band gained more control over their direction than they had when signed with Arista. Adema lauded Earache for allowing "bands to express themselves creatively."

On April 5, 2005, the band would deliver their next album, Planets produced by Nick Forcillo. They released the album's first single, "Tornado," back on February 18, 2005.

Planets, as an album, was musically, a significant break from Adema's two earlier albums; it was much closer to rock than Adema's nu metal history. In comparison to the previous albums, which featured heavy usages of programming and synthesizers, Planets features stronger piano melodies and guitar-drive harmonics. Kohls said that the band relied on influences from classic rock and that the band proved that they were "so much more than" a nu metal band. The writing for the album was shared between the four members with Fluckey recording all of the guitar portions of the album.

Luke Caraccioli played his first show with Adema in the Persian Gulf in April 2005. They performed for American troops stationed in Iraq and Kuwait for the Armed Forces Entertainment. Though the Iraq War was still raging, the band stressed that the tour was apolitical. Adema then promoted the release by touring with Brides of Destruction, a band that Kohls had briefly been involved in. Though proud of their identity change, the band noted that they had a mixture of fans from both the "old" and "new" Adema at live shows.

In September of that year, the band released a second single from the album, "Planets." The music video for the single was featured in the film, Cry Wolf.

In October 2005, after only 10 months, Luke Caraccioli, having difficulties adjusting to being away from home, left the band, citing personal reasons. Following his departure, the band got in touch with Mark Chavez and according to the band, both parties were back on good terms. Both parties even had talks about Chavez singing for Adema again and even wrote some new songs together, nothing transpired from these events until August 2009.

=== 2006–2008: Kill The Headlights with Bobby Reeves and hiatus ===
In March 2006, Adema announced a new vocalist, Bobby Reeves, a former member of the band LEVEL. In August, the band recruited guitarist Ed Faris, also a former member of LEVEL. With their new lineup, the band signed onto Immortal Records in February 2007. They released Kill the Headlights, produced by Marshall Altman (Marc Broussard, Zebrahead) in August 2007. The first single, "Cold and Jaded," was released in July.

In early 2008 Dave DeRoo announced the band decided to go on a "hiatus" to regroup, take a break, and assured fans they had not broken up.

=== 2009–2011: Reunion and departure of original lineup ===
On August 13, 2009, Mark Chavez posted a blog on his official Myspace page stating that he had returned to Adema. He also planned for the band to write an album and begin touring before the release of said album.

It was later confirmed that both Mark Chavez and original guitarist Mike Ransom were back in the band. A second blog from the band's Myspace stated that both Bobby Reeves and Ed Faris had agreed to leave the band and that this was the right thing to do for Adema and their fans, the blog went on to say, "This SURE won't be the last you see of Bobby or Ed, and we wanted to take the time to thank them for their service in the line of duty..."

Adema announced on their official Twitter page that the first rehearsal with the original lineup in 6 years took place November 15, 2009.

The original members of Adema played their first show together in over five years on January 14, 2010, at the Whisky a Go Go in West Hollywood.

A full 2010 tour list across the United States had also been posted on the band's Myspace and Facebook page and new material was announced to be released around February 2011. The band went on their 2010 tour. However, Mike Ransom was unable to join them due to his commitments with recording an album with his band, Black Heart Vacancy. He left once again in November.

Mark Chavez abruptly left Adema once again before the start of the 2011 tour to pursue his solo project. Guitarist Tim Fluckey and Bassist David DeRoo have since taken over vocal duties.

The reason behind Chavez's departure was that he had another conflict with the band. Chavez brought his wife with him on the band's 2010 tour. When the band didn't let her on the 2011 tour, he reportedly told the other members, "Alright, if you think you can do this without me, you go right ahead."

In January 2011, bassist David DeRoo was arrested just prior to performing a concert in Connecticut, and was charged with being a fugitive of the law. A warrant for his arrest was issued in July 2010 for violating his probation issued from a prior DUI incident in November 2008. DeRoo's bond was set at US$1 million. Being contractually obligated to fulfill their already scheduled 2011 tour dates, Tim Fluckey, Kris Kohls and touring fill-in and the Mentors lead vocalist and drummer Marc DeLeon performed as Adema in the absence of DeRoo.

=== 2011–2013: Topple the Giants ===
On their official Facebook page, the band announced on July 19, 2011, "We're going in the studio this week! New music coming soon!". Since then they had also announced a new EP, Topple the Giants, available for download in February 2012 along with a special edition disc in March. It included new songs along with old songs re-recorded with the current line-up. A full-length album was announced to be released later in summer 2012. However, on May 22, 2012, they announced that their new EP "that was slated for release on all digital formats today has been delayed until further notice." After finally signing a deal with Pavement Entertainment in early 2013, the band had announced they would release Topple the Giants on the release date of April 2, 2013. Many have called the cover one of the worst metal album covers of all time.

=== 2013–2017: Mike Ransom's second return ===
On September 13, 2013, Dave DeRoo announced that Mike Ransom had rejoined Adema.

=== 2017–2024: Chavez' third short tenure and replacement with Ryan Shuck ===
On March 27, 2017, Mark Chavez was seen rehearsing with original members of Adema, signifying his return to band. They performed with him at the Whisky A Go Go on May 24, 2017, his first show with the band in six years. The band later confirmed that they were working on a new album. Following their last shows in December of that year, no news emerged until June 2019, when it was announced that Chavez had departed again. Julien-K frontman Ryan Shuck confirmed he would be fronting the band for their fall tour with Powerman 5000. In March 2021, the band announced via their Facebook page that they are in the studio working on new material. Various pictures and videos of the band members recording their tracks were shown.

Adema released their new single with new frontman Ryan Shuck titled "Ready to Die" on August 20, 2021. On June 24, 2022, Adema released their second single with Shuck titled "Violent Principles".

Adema debut their first EP with Shuck titled "The Cerberus" while embarking on 2023's Nu-Metal Madness Tour 2 with returning bands Hed PE, Crazy Town, and newcomer Tantric. The EP contains both previously released singles "Ready To Die" and "Violent Principles", along with new single "You Wanted This" (released exclusively on the EP). Along with the new EP, a live recording titled "Live at the Den in Los Angeles" was also released.

=== 2024–present: Ryan Shuck's departure and future ===
On February 27, 2024, Ryan Shuck confirmed his departure from the band through his social media accounts, stating his time with the band came abruptly to an end and that he would be focusing on his touring commitments to Julien-K. The band announced in their own statement that they would be continuing as a four piece lineup indefinitely, though future plans and tours were not affected with the line-up change.

Following Shuck's departure, the band signed with Cleopatra Records and finished writing songs for the upcoming fifth album. Recording and mixing for the fifth album has started in December 2025. The upcoming album is set for a 2026 release.

In May 2026, the band announced their partnership with Worldwide Entertainment Group, through their press release via Variety. They also announced that Kohls will not be touring on their upcoming shows. He is temporarily replaced by Doug Pellerin, formerly of Otep for the upcoming shows. Despite his hiatus, he recorded drums for the upcoming album Cruel Machine.

The band will be touring for spring 2026 shows with Powerman 5000 and for fall 2026 shows in the UK with SOiL and Finger Eleven.

== Musical style and Influences ==
Adema's music has been described as nu metal, alternative rock, post-grunge, alternative metal and hard rock. The bands musical influences are Nirvana, Korn, Alice in Chains, Led Zeppelin, U2, Guns N' Roses, Motley Crue, Metallica, Pantera, Tool, Nine Inch Nails, and Soundgarden.

== Band members ==
Current

- Tim Fluckey – lead guitar, backing vocals (2000–present), keyboards, programming (2000–2006, 2009–present), rhythm guitar (2003–2006, 2010–2013), lead vocals (2011–2017, 2024–present)
- Dave DeRoo – bass, backing vocals (2000–present)
- Mike Ransom – rhythm guitar, backing vocals (2000–2003, 2009–2010, 2013–present)

Former

- Mark Chavez – lead vocals (2000–2004, 2009–2011, 2017–2019)
- Luke Caraccioli – lead vocals (2005)
- Bobby Reeves – lead vocals (2006–2009)
- Ed Faris – rhythm guitar, keyboards, programming (2006–2009)
- Ryan Shuck – lead vocals (2019–2024)
- Kris Kohls – drums (2000–2026, on hiatus)

Touring/Session

- Marc DeLeon – rhythm guitar (2011–2013, session musician 2013), bass (2011)
- Doug Pellerin – drums (2026–present)

Timeline

== Discography ==
Studio albums

- Adema (2001)
- Unstable (2003)
- Planets (2005)
- Kill the Headlights (2007)
- Cruel Machine (2027)

EPs

- Insomniac's Dream (2002)
- Topple the Giants (2013)
- The Cerberus (2023)

Live Albums

- Live at the Den in Los Angeles (2023)

Compilations

- Re-Connected (2019)
