= The Way You Like It =

Single by Adema

from the album Adema
- Released: November 27, 2001
- Recorded: 2000–2001
- Studio: Henson Studios, Los Angeles
- Genre: Nu metal
- Length: 3:40
- Label: Arista
- Songwriter: Adema
- Producers: Bill Appleberry, Tobias Miller

Adema singles chronology
"Giving In" (2001)	"The Way You Like It" (2001)	"Freaking Out" (2002)

"The Way You Like It" is the second single from Adema's self-titled debut album.

== Meaning ==
The song is about how fame changes people, how it can control people, and how it changes people into somebody they are not.

== Music video ==
The music video, directed by Gregory Dark, depicts Adema playing to a large crowd of people in what appears to be an underground style moshpit. As the band plays, the video cuts away to Adema driving around town, with various scenarios along the way. As the band drives through town:

- Mark Chavez leaves the group and goes off with two women, who are later shown in the crowd as the band performs.
- Lead guitarist Tim Fluckey falls asleep and the group cover him in ketchup.
- Rhythm guitarist Mike Ransom has a woman seduce a man with a VIP card and whilst he is not looking, she slips Mike the VIP card which he uses it to get into the club.
- Bassist Dave DeRoo also tries to enter the VIP club, but is stopped at the door. He tries to sneak through the back but is apprehended and thrown out. He then buys a fake pass from a hustler.
- Drummer Kris Kohls desperately needs the bathroom, but is thrown out of the men's room. He then runs into a women's bathroom and relieves himself in the sink, next to a girl that is putting lip stick on, who smiles at him.

In the end of the video, the band members try to get into the club, but are stopped by a large guard. Chester Bennington, and Joe Hahn of the nu metal band Linkin Park make a guest appearance, and tell the guard to stand down, allowing Adema access to the club.

== Track listing ==
- 1. "The Way You Like It"
- 2. "Giving In" (Live)

US Promo CD

- 1. "The Way You Like It" - 3:40

Limited Edition CD Single

- 1. "The Way You Like It" (Radio edit)
- 2. "Giving In" (Live)
- 3. "Freaking Out" (Live)
- 4. "The Way You Like It" (Live In Amsterdam)
- Kerrang interview (Enhanced section)

== Charts ==
Chart performance for "Giving In"
Chart (2001)	Peak position
US Alternative Songs (Billboard)	15
US Mainstream Rock (Billboard)	21
UK Singles (OCC)	61
