= Planets (Adema album) =

Studio album by Adema
- Released: April 5, 2005
- Recorded: 2004
- Genre: Alternative metal; post-grunge; nu metal
- Length: 72:34
- Label: Earache
- Producer: Adema, Nick Forcillo

Adema chronology
Unstable (2003)	Planets (2005)	Kill the Headlights (2007)

Singles from Planets
- 1. "Tornado" Released: February 18, 2005; 2. "Planets" Released: May 6, 2005; 3. "Shoot the Arrows" Released: May 27, 2005

Professional ratings
Review scores
Source	Rating
411Mania	(9/10)
Allmusic	2.5/5 stars
Blabbermouth.net	(6/10)
Drowned in Sound	(3/10)
Melodic	3.5/5 stars
Sea of Tranquility	3/5 stars

Planets is the third studio album by the American rock band Adema. This is Adema's first and only album with Luke Carracioli, who left the band on October 25, 2005, citing "personal differences". The album was released by Earache Records on April 5, 2005. It obtained a peak position of 152 on the Billboard 200 before falling off. The album featured three singles: "Tornado", "Shoot the Arrows", and the self-titled track "Planets". "Planets" also was featured in the movie Cry Wolf.

== Track listing ==
All tracks are written by Adema, except "The Thing That Should Not Be" written by Hammett, Hetfield, Ulrich.

No.	Title	Length
1.	"Shoot the Arrows"	4:27
2.	"Barricades in Time"	4:18
3.	"Tornado"	3:49
4.	"Sevenfold"	5:06
5.	"Planets"	3:58
6.	"Enter the Cage"	4:04
7.	"Remember"	5:31
8.	"Chel"	3:42
9.	"Until Now"	3:47
10.	"Rise Above"	5:02
11.	"Bad Triangle" (featuring Rio Life)	4:00
12.	"Better Living Through Chemistry"	4:52
13.	"Refusing Consciousness"	3:24
14.	"Lift Us Up"	5:23
15.	"Vikraphone"	3:48
16.	"Estrellas" (contains hidden track - cover of Metallica's "The Thing That Should Not Be". It starts at 1:20.)	7:41

Note: International (European) edition of Planets doesn't contain Bad Triangle, Lift Us Up or The Thing That Should Not Be.

== Credits ==
Adema

- Luke Caraccioli - lead vocals
- Tim Fluckey - lead and rhythm guitars, piano, backing vocals
- Dave DeRoo - bass guitar, backing vocals
- Kris Kohls - drums, percussion

Additional musician

- Additional Vocals on "Bad Triangle" by Rio Life

Production

- Planets Produced and Mixed by Adema and Nick Forcillo
- Engineered by Nick Forcillo
- Recorded and Mixed at Fattracks/Pig Studios, Oildale, CA
- Mastered by Tom Baker at Precision Mastering, Hollywood, CA
- Drum Technician and Assistance: Mark Deleon
- Equipment Rental: Pacwest Sound, Bakersfield, CA
- Art Direction & Design: Asterik Studio, Seattle, WA
- Photography by Alex Solca
- A&R: Al Dawson
- Legal: The Law Offices of Terri L. DiPaolo Esq.
- Business Management: Wayne Kamemoto at Gudvi, Sussman, & Oppenheim
- Management: Kevin Lee and Novi Entertainment
- Design by Chris Amendola at O.C. Logic

== Charts ==
Chart (2005)	Peak position
UK Independent Albums (Official Charts)	27
UK Rock & Metal Albums (Official Charts)	20
US Billboard 200	152
US Independent Albums (Billboard)	11
