= The Great Divide (Scott Stapp song) =

Single by Scott Stapp

from the album The Great Divide
- Released: September 26, 2005
- Recorded: 2004–2005
- Genre: Post-grunge; Christian rock; hard rock; alternative rock
- Length: 4:02
- Label: Wind-up
- Songwriter: Scott Stapp
- Producers: John Kurzweg; Scott Stapp; Ron Saint Germain

Scott Stapp singles chronology
| "Relearn Love" (2004) | "The Great Divide" (2005) | "Justify" (2006) |

Music video
- "The Great Divide" on YouTube

"The Great Divide" is the second single by American singer Scott Stapp, released on September 26, 2005. The song was later included on Stapp's debut solo album of the same name, released on November 22, 2005. It and Stapp's song "You Will Soar" served as WWE's fourth annual Tribute to the Troops theme songs on December 11, 2006.

== Charts ==
Chart performance for "The Great Divide"
| Chart (2005) | Peak position |
|---|---|
| Australia (ARIA) | 91 |
| US Bubbling Under Hot 100 (Billboard) | 10 |
| US Adult Pop Airplay (Billboard) | 24 |
| US Mainstream Rock (Billboard) | 20 |
| US Pop 100 (Billboard) | 84 |
