= Adema (album) =

Studio album by Adema
- Released: August 21, 2001
- Recorded: 2000–2001
- Studio: Henson Studios (Los Angeles)
- Genre: Nu metal
- Length: 42:59
- Label: Arista
- Producers: Bill Appleberry; Tobias Miller

Adema chronology
Adema (2001)	Insomniac's Dream (2002)

Singles from Adema
- 1. "Giving In" Released: June 8, 2001; 2. "The Way You Like It" Released: November 27, 2001; 3. "Freaking Out" Released: February 15, 2002

Professional ratings
Review scores
Source	Rating
AllMusic	4/5 stars
Blender	2/5 stars
Entertainment Weekly	B−
Metal.de	3/10
Rock Hard	7.5/10
Rock Sound	2/5 stars
Rolling Stone	2.5/5 stars

Adema is the debut album by American rock band Adema. It was released on August 21, 2001 through Arista Records and peaked at #27 on the Billboard 200. The album was certified gold by the Recording Industry Association of America (RIAA) on March 6, 2002 for selling over 500,000 copies in the United States, and has since sold over 1 million copies worldwide. The major singles from the album were "The Way You Like It" and "Giving In". "Freaking Out" has also seen some radio airplay. It remains their best-selling album to date.

== Track listing ==
All tracks are written by Adema, except where noted.

No.	Title	Writer(s)	Length
1.	"Everyone"		3:31
2.	"Blow It Away"		3:03
3.	"Giving In"		4:35
4.	"Freaking Out"	Adema, Bill Appleberry	3:36
5.	"The Way You Like It"		3:39
6.	"Close Friends"		3:26
7.	"Do What You Want to Do"		3:01
8.	"Skin"	Adema, Mike Montano, Eric Jackson	3:24
9.	"Pain Inside"		3:30
10.	"Speculum"		3:32
11.	"Drowning"		3:29
12.	"Trust"		4:21
13.	"Shattered" (Japanese Bonus Track)		3:09

== Personnel ==
Adema

- Mark Chavez – vocals
- Tim Fluckey – lead guitar, backing vocals, keyboards, programming
- Mike Ransom – rhythm guitar
- Dave DeRoo – bass, backing vocals
- Kris Kohls – drums

== Production ==
- Produced and Engineered by Tobias Miller & Bill Appleberry
- Brian Cook – assistant engineer
- Mixed by Alan Moulder
- Tom Stanley – assistant mixing engineer
- Mixed by David J. Holman at Cactus Studio Hollywood
- Mastered by Dave Collins at Marcussen Mastering
- Joshua Sarubin – A&R
- Jeff Schulz – art direction, design
- Dean Karr – photography
- Terry Lippman Company – management
- Gelfand, Rennert & Feldman – business management
- Terri L. DiPaolo for Manatt, Phelps & Phillips – legal
- Estée Ochoa – styling

== Charts ==
Chart (2001)	Peak position
UK Rock & Metal Albums (Official Charts)	18
US Billboard 200	27

=== Singles ===
Year	Single	Chart	Position
2001	"Giving In"	US Hot Mainstream Rock Tracks	16
2001	"Giving In"	US Hot Modern Rock Tracks	14
2002	"The Way You Like It"	US Hot Mainstream Rock Tracks	21
2002	"The Way You Like It"	US Hot Modern Rock Tracks	15
2002	"Freaking Out"	US Hot Mainstream Rock Tracks	25
2002	"Freaking Out"	US Hot Modern Rock Tracks	36

== Certifications ==
Region	Certification	Certified units/sales
United States (RIAA)	Gold	671,763
