= Giving In =

Single by Adema

from the album Adema
- Released: June 8, 2001
- Genre: Nu metal
- Length: 4:34
- Label: Arista
- Songwriter: Adema
- Producers: Bill Appleberry, Tobias Miller

Adema singles chronology
"Giving In" (2001)	"The Way You Like It" (2002)

"Giving In" is the first single from American rock band Adema's self-titled debut album. The song appeared on Now That's What I Call Music! 9, as well as in a commercial for AT&T Cingular. It is one of the band's most popular and well known songs.

== Music video ==
The music video for "Giving In" (directed by Paul Fedor) features Adema playing on what appears to be an outdoor rooftop under a dark sky, moving as if on a conveyor belt, while lead singer Mark Chavez moves through different rooms. The rooms and scenarios that are shown while the band are playing include a hotel room with a couple, a little girl sitting on a rocking chair watching a violent movie, and a woman in a glass tank. As the video progresses, certain changes take place. People who are apparently either invisible or are meant to be there stand around the bed watching the couple have sex. A car crash takes place behind the little girl, and a man starts kissing the woman in the tank that has now been filled up with water.

== Track listing ==
Maxi CD single

- 1. "Giving In" (Radio Edit)
- 2. "Shattered"
- 3. "Blow It Away" (Demo)
- 4. "Giving In" (Video)

Import CDS

- 1. "Giving In" (Radio Edit)
- 2. "Shattered"
- 3. "Everyone" (Demo)
- 4. "Blow It Away" (Demo)

Radio CD

- 1. "Giving In" (Radio Edit) - 3:55
- 2. "Giving In" (Album Version) - 4:35

Giving In / Do What You Want To Do Promo CD

- 1. "Giving In" - 4:35
- 2. "Do What You Want To" - 3:01

== Charts ==
Chart performance for "Giving In"
Chart (2001)	Peak position
US Alternative Songs (Billboard)	14
US Mainstream Rock (Billboard)	16
UK Singles (OCC)	62
UK Rock (OCC)	6
