= The Best of Creed =

Greatest hits album by Creed
- Released: September 23, 2025
- Genre: Post-grunge
- Length: 52:39
- Label: Craft Recordings

Creed chronology
Stadium Anthems (2023)	The Best of Creed (2025)	Live in San Antonio (2025)

The Best of Creed is a greatest hits album by the American post-grunge band Creed, released on September 23, 2025, by Craft Recordings. Released during a resurgence of the band, the record features ten songs spanning their four studio albums, available on CD and vinyl. Limited-edition color vinyl pressings were also made, while the CD version includes two additional songs, "Hide" and "A Thousand Faces".

== Critical reception ==
Professional ratings
Review scores
Source	Rating
AllMusic	3.5/5 stars
Blabbermouth	9/10

Writing for AllMusic, Neil Z. Young states it "serves the casual fan, one who fondly remembers these massive radio/MTV hits but doesn't feel like picking up their actual albums", concluding by saying that "As it stands, three tracks from each studio album is a fair distribution and this is a fine snapshot of a career that deserves a little more credit than it got at the time of Creed's peak in popularity." In a Blabbermouth review, Anne Erickson states that "While the new mastering brings a slick, modern sound to these classics, which at this point are decades old", she notes that "Highlights include opening track "Higher", which sounds even bigger and more explosive than the original version, and "Torn", whose thick guitars and drums especially benefit from the modern mastering".

== Track listing ==
=== Digital/CD edition ===
Standard edition
No.	Title	Original album	Length
1.	"Higher" (radio edit)	Human Clay (1999)	4:44
2.	"One Last Breath"	Weathered (2001)	4:00
3.	"My Own Prison" (radio edit)	My Own Prison (1997)	4:15
4.	"Overcome"	Full Circle (2009)	3:48
5.	"What If" (radio edit)	Human Clay	4:53
6.	"My Sacrifice"	Weathered	4:56
7.	"With Arms Wide Open" (single version)	Human Clay	3:42
8.	"Torn" (radio edit)	My Own Prison	5:22
9.	"Rain"	Full Circle	3:28
10.	"What's This Life For"	My Own Prison	4:09
11.	"Hide"	Weathered	4:27
12.	"A Thousand Faces"	Full Circle	4:55
Total length:			52:39

=== Vinyl edition ===
Side one

1. "Higher" (radio edit)
2. "One Last Breath"
3. "My Own Prison" (radio edit)
4. "Overcome"
5. "What If" (radio edit)

Side two

1. "My Sacrifice"
2. "With Arms Wide Open" (single version)
3. "Torn" (radio edit)
4. "Rain"
5. "What's This Life For"

== Charts ==
Chart (2025)	Peak position
New Zealand Albums (RMNZ)	17
US Billboard 200	103
US Top Alternative Albums (Billboard)	11
US Top Hard Rock Albums (Billboard)	4
US Independent Albums (Billboard)	13
US Top Rock Albums (Billboard)	17
