= With Arms Wide Open: A Retrospective =

Compilation album by Creed
- Released: November 20, 2015
- Recorded: 1995–2009
- Genres: Post-grunge; hard rock; alternative rock; alternative metal
- Length: 68:43 (disc one); 51:57 (disc two); 57:01 (disc three)
- Labels: Bicycle Music Company; Concord Music Group
- Producer: Mark Copeland

Creed chronology
Full Circle (2009)	With Arms Wide Open: A Retrospective (2015)	Stadium Anthems (2023)

With Arms Wide Open: A Retrospective is a compilation album by American rock band Creed, which was released on November 20, 2015. It is a three disc set, with disc one devoted to the band's radio hits, disc two for rarities and demos, and disc three for acoustic tracks. It is Creed's first album released since the acquisition of Wind-Up Records by Bicycle Music Company in 2013 and later Concord merging Bicycle and Concord Music Group to form Concord Bicycle Music in 2015. With Arms Wide Open: A Retrospective is a Walmart exclusive in the United States.

== Background ==
Guitarist and founding member Mark Tremonti first broke the news of a new Creed release in August 2015 whilst promoting his solo album Cauterize. Following Scott Stapp's mental breakdown in November 2014 and his road to recovery in 2015, Tremonti was asked if he saw himself working with Creed again in the future. Despite playing down the option, the guitarist let slip that he and Stapp were speaking again and would likely collaborate on a box set of Creed's music. During an interview about his recent diagnosis of Bipolar disorder in September, Stapp confirmed a "retrospective" of Creed's material to be released in late 2015 that would contain "hits, favorite album picks, acoustic versions of all the hits, live performances, unreleased demos". Tremonti later stated that he would have preferred a 2017 release date for the retrospective, as it would mark the 20th anniversary of the band's debut album My Own Prison.

== Track listing ==
All tracks are written by Scott Stapp and Mark Tremonti, except where noted.

Disc one – Best Of: The Singles
No.	Title	Length
1.	"My Own Prison" (radio edit; from "My Own Prison" single)	4:14
2.	"Torn" (radio edit)	5:21
3.	"What's This Life For" (album edit)	3:31
4.	"One" (radio edit)	4:34
5.	"What If" (radio edit)	4:52
6.	"Higher" (top 40 version)	4:42
7.	"With Arms Wide Open" (strings version; from "With Arms Wide Open" single)	3:55
8.	"Are You Ready?" (from Human Clay)	4:46
9.	"My Sacrifice" (radio edit; from "My Sacrifice" UK, Australian and European single)	4:19
10.	"Bullets" (Weathered)	3:51
11.	"One Last Breath" (radio edit; from "One Last Breath" Australian, UK, European and New Zealand single)	4:01
12.	"Don't Stop Dancing" (Weathered)	4:30
13.	"Weathered" (radio edit)	4:50
14.	"Overcome" (from Full Circle)	3:47
15.	"Rain" (pop mix)	3:19
16.	"A Thousand Faces" (radio edit)	4:05
Total length:		68:43

Disc two – Rarities & Demos
No.	Title	Writer(s)	Length
1.	"To Whom It May Concern" (from The Scorpion King soundtrack)		5:11
2.	"Is This the End?" (Scream edit; from Scream 3: The Album)		6:15
3.	"Bound & Tied" (from My Own Prison (International Edition))		5:36
4.	"Young Grow Old" (from Human Clay (European Edition))		4:46
5.	"Silent Teacher" (from Full Circle (UK Edition))		3:44
6.	"I'm Eighteen" (from The Faculty: Music from the Dimension Motion Picture)	Alice Cooper; Neal Smith; Dennis Dunaway; Glen Buxton; Michael Bruce	3:11
7.	"Roadhouse Blues" (live at Woodstock 1999, featuring Robbie Krieger)	Jim Morrison	5:53
8.	"Riders on the Storm" (from Stoned Immaculate: The Music of the Doors)	John Densmore; Krieger; Ray Manzarek; Morrison	6:17
9.	"Blistered" (demo)		4:07
10.	"More Than This" (demo)		3:28
11.	"Why" (demo)		3:23
Total length:			51:57

Disc three – Acoustic
No.	Title	Length
1.	"My Sacrifice" (live acoustic)	4:46
2.	"My Own Prison" (acoustic version – extended)	5:01
3.	"Don't Stop Dancing" (acoustic version #3)	3:41
4.	"With Arms Wide Open" (acoustic version)	3:54
5.	"What's This Life For" (alternate version – clean)	4:22
6.	"Rain" (live acoustic)	3:29
7.	"My Own Prison" (live acoustic)	4:46
8.	"With Arms Wide Open" (live acoustic)	4:03
9.	"Overcome" (live acoustic)	4:24
10.	"One" (live acoustic)	4:58
11.	"Torn" (live acoustic)	6:02
12.	"Higher" (live acoustic)	4:28
13.	"To Whom It May Concern" (acoustic live)	3:02
Total length:		57:01
