= Red Goodbye =

Indie rock band from New York

- Origin: Oneonta, New York, United States
- Genres: Indie rock
- Years active: 2006–2011
- Label: Horn/Ruimy Music
- Past members: Andrew Horn, Alex Ruimy
- Website: Official Website

Red Goodbye were an indie rock band from Long Island, New York. They have released 4 CDs independently, the most recent of which (One Time Mountain) has received broad exposure on the internet. The band split up in 2011 and singer Andrew Horn formed a new band, One Time Mountain, who have since released their new EP "Window Shaded EP".

== Full Circle Torrents ==
In summer 2009, several months after rock band Creed announced that their reunion album would be titled Full Circle, hundreds of torrents appeared on peer-to-peer file sharing sites labeled as a leaked copy of Full Circle but actually containing Red Goodbye's One Time Mountain, with modified file names and ID3 Tags. were enough to make the "leak" appear authentic. Some fans of the band were reportedly unaware they were not listening to Creed for months, until they searched for lyrics online and posted the accounts on the band's official website.

In the months leading up to the official Creed release, the album was downloaded upwards of 70,000 times.

== Band members ==
- Andrew Horn (Vocals/Songwriting)
- Alex Ruimy (Guitar/Songwriting)

=== Touring ===
- Tom "Ham Sandwich" Vicale - drums
- Mick LeBrian - bass (former)

== Discography ==
- (Untitled) (November 2006)
- The Second Demo (March 2007)
- Demo 3 (December 2007)
- One Time Mountain: The RadioTower EP (February 3, 2009)
- RadioTower (Anticipated 2011)

== Singles ==
- The first single officially released was the version of "God and Girl" that appears on One Time Mountain
- The second single is expected to be "Shakespeare Lied", also from One Time Mountain

== Tours ==
- Red Goodbye played various venues in Oneonta, New York from 2006 to 2008
