= Live in San Antonio =

Live album by Creed
- Released: November 28, 2025
- Recorded: November 4 (or 14), 1999
- Genre: Post-grunge; hard rock; alternative rock; alternative metal
- Length: 38:22 (disc one); 35:45 (disc two)
- Label: Craft Recordings

Creed chronology
The Best of Creed (2025)	Live in San Antonio (2025)

Live in San Antonio is a live album by American rock band Creed, which was released on November 28, 2025. The recording is taken from the November 4, 1999 (or possibly November 14) performance at Freeman Coliseum in San Antonio, Texas. It was released only on a two vinyl LP set, with a limited amount of 4,800 worldwide copies for Record Store Day Black Friday 2025. The album was previously released with the 25th anniversary deluxe edition of the band's second studio album, Human Clay, in 2024.

== Background ==
There's discrepancy as to when the performance actually took place. Bootlegs and fan archival state that the concert took place on November 4, 1999, while the official release for Live in San Antonio states that it was November 14 of the same year. What's more, the release of the songs for the 25th anniversary of Human Clay also states that the concert was on November 4. Whatever the actual date, the performance captures Creed at their Human Clay zenith — playing in front of a sold out crowd mere months after the album's release. The soundboard recording captures the noise of the crowd and frontman Scott Stapp's dialogue with the audience. The thirteen songs were pressed on metallic-silver 2-LP, with only 4,800 copies made available worldwide.

== Reception ==
Cryptic Rock gave the album a rating of 5/5, describing it as "an energized performance worth listening to time and time again, offering a flawless mix of songs from Creed’s first two records." Heaven's Metal Magazine was also favorable toward Live in San Antonio, complimenting the mix of the tracks. They also praised the background vocals, stating, "The background vocals are also mixed well, which is a surprise with a live album." Glide Magazine lauds the second half of the record, mentioning that "What If," "With Arms Wide Open," "Faceless Man," "What's This Life For," "One," and "Higher" are better than their studio album counterparts and/or are quintessential arena songs.

== Track listing ==
All tracks are written by Scott Stapp and Mark Tremonti.

Disc one
No.	Title	Length
1.	"Are You Ready?"	4:31
2.	"Ode"	5:11
3.	"Torn"	6:28
4.	"Beautiful"	4:36
5.	"Illusion"	5:55
6.	"Say I"	6:03
7.	"My Own Prison"	5:38
Total length:		38:22

Disc two
No.	Title	Length
1.	"What If"	5:11
2.	"With Arms Wide Open"	5:24
3.	"Faceless Man"	6:43
4.	"What's This Life For"	6:54
5.	"One"	5:28
6.	"Higher"	6:05
Total length:		35:45

== Personnel ==
- Scott Stapp – vocals
- Mark Tremonti – guitar
- Brian Marshall – bass
- Scott Phillips – drums

=== Technical ===
- JN-H – lacquer cut
- Sage LaMonica – design
- Glenn DiCrocco – photography
