= Summer of '99 and Beyond Festival =

2025 music festival in Wisconsin, U.S.

- Date: 18 July 2025 – 19 July 2025
- Locations: Alpine Valley Music Theatre, East Troy, Wisconsin, United States

The Summer of '99 and Beyond Festival was a music festival took place between 18 and 19 July 2025 at the Alpine Valley Music Theatre in East Troy, Wisconsin, United States. The festival was headlined by Creed and Nickelback, and had an emphasis on popular music from the late-1990s and early 2000s.

The festival takes its name from the Creed tour, The Summer of '99 and Beyond,

== Line-up ==
Friday	Saturday
Nickelback Live Daughtry Tonic Our Lady Peace Lit	Creed A Day to Remember Sevendust Mammoth Hinder Vertical Horizon Fuel
