= One (Creed song) =

Single by Creed

from the album My Own Prison
- Released: December 1, 1998
- Recorded: 1995
- Studio: The Kitchen Studio (Tallahassee, Florida); Criteria Studios (Miami, Florida)
- Genre: Post-grunge
- Length: 5:02 (album version); 4:34 (radio edit)
- Songwriters: Scott Stapp, Mark Tremonti
- Producer: John Kurzweg

Creed singles chronology
"What's This Life For" (1998)	"One" (1998)	"Higher" (1999)

"One" is a song by the American rock band Creed. It is the fourth single as well as the tenth and final track from the band's 1997 debut album My Own Prison. It was also included as a B-side on the maxi-single for "With Arms Wide Open" in 2000.

== Writing and recording ==
"One" was one of 10-15 songs written by the band prior to entering the recording studio. The song was composed by singer Scott Stapp and guitarist Mark Tremonti and was originally recorded at producer John Kurzweg's home studio called "The Kitchen Studio", in Tallahassee, Florida. The band was on a pay-as-you-go agreement at the time, as each of the band members were attending college and working 40 hour-a-week jobs. They would then each pitch in around $100 a week and enter the studio to record demos. Unlike later records where Pro Tools was used, Kurzweg recorded the songs analog directly to tape. This process took about six months to complete and would cost the band $6,000. Stapp recalls: "I recorded vocals in a room where there was toys all over the floor, bunk beds next to me in his kids' room and the guys would all do their parts." Stapp then said: "I think when we started getting early mixes of the record, we really started to feel like we had something special. We didn't have a record deal. This was all on our own dime and our own time and we had hopes of getting a record deal and getting this music out, but really had no clue where it was gonna go."

Recording would continue at Criteria Studios in Miami, but the inclusion of "One" on the record was questioned by the band as they felt its sound was a departure from the direction they wanted to go in. After going back and forth as to whether or not they would include the song on the record at all, the band ultimately kept it on the record due to the positive response the song was receiving from fans as well as the label. Following the Blue Collar Records release of My Own Prison on April 14, 1997, the band was picked up and signed by Wind-up Records who wanted the band to re-record the whole album. After being given a small budget and two weeks to re-record, Kurzweg and Creed would only complete two songs before realizing it wasn't working out. Wind-up Records and the band reached a compromise and settled on remixing the album at Long View Farm in Massachusetts with Ron St. Germain. After some initial difficulties working with St. Germain, Kurzweg was brought in to help work on the remixing and eventually found working common ground with the band and St. Germain.

== Music and lyrics ==
"One" features a catchy and upbeat tone and was considered by the band to be a departure from their sound compared to other songs on My Own Prison. The song decries racial tensions in modern society and "discrimination now on both sides" which causes "seeds of hate [to] blossom further." The song suggests that "the goal is to be unified" and therefore "why hold down one to raise another?" To move on, we must realize that "the only way is one" because "all we want is unity" and "in the end we meet our fate together."

== Release and reception ==
"One" was the fourth and final promotional single issued from the band's debut album, and was the only single to not have a music video. Because Creed's singles were not initially sold in the United States, they were ineligible for the US Billboard Hot 100. However, by the time "One" was released, that restriction was lifted, and the song became Creed's first song that charted on the Billboard Hot 100, charting at number 70.

"One" also managed to peak at number 49 on the US Billboard Hot 100 Airplay chart in April 1999, and also reached the number two spot on both the Mainstream Rock Tracks and the Modern Rock Tracks. On the former chart, it was ranked the number one track of 1999, despite its number two peak position. The song also helped Creed win their first and only Top Rock Single of the Year at the 1999 Billboard Music Awards.

== Appearances in media ==
The band played "One" on February 3, 1999, during their very first television performance on Late Show with David Letterman. During the performance the band accidentally began playing the song before Letterman had finished introducing them and promoting My Own Prison, causing Letterman to force the band to abruptly stop playing the song so he could properly introduce them.

The song was used in a video montage at the 2nd annual WWE Tribute to the Troops professional wrestling event in 2004. It was also used as wrestler Ricky Steamboat's entrance theme in 2006 and 2007 Raw live events.

== Chart performance ==
Chart (1999)	Peak position
Canada Rock/Alternative (RPM)	9
Canada Top Singles (RPM)	39
US Billboard Hot 100	70
US Alternative Airplay (Billboard)	2
US Mainstream Rock (Billboard)	2

=== Year-end charts ===
Chart (1999)	Peak position
US Billboard Hot 100 Airplay	61
US Mainstream Rock (Billboard)	1
US Modern Rock (Billboard)	6

== Certifications ==
Certifications for "One"
Region	Certification	Certified units/sales
New Zealand (RMNZ)	Gold	15,000^{‡}
^{‡} Sales+streaming figures based on certification alone.
