= What's This Life For =

Single by Creed

from the album My Own Prison
- Released: June 9, 1998
- Recorded: 1995
- Studio: The Kitchen Studio (Tallahassee, Florida); Criteria Studios (Miami, Florida)
- Genre: Post-grunge
- Length: 4:08 (album version); 3:30 (radio edit)
- Label: Wind-up
- Songwriters: Scott Stapp; Mark Tremonti

Creed singles chronology
"Torn" (1998)	"What's This Life For" (1998)	"One" (1998)

Music video
- "What's This Life For" on YouTube

"What's This Life For" is a song by American rock band Creed. It is the third single and ninth track off their 1997 debut album, My Own Prison. The song reached number one on the Billboard Hot Mainstream Rock Tracks chart in the U.S., becoming the band's first number one hit on this chart. It remained on top for six weeks.

== Writing and recording ==
Writing sessions for My Own Prison would see Vocalist Scott Stapp and guitarist Mark Tremonti have complete creative control over the lyrics and musical compositions. Stapp recounts in an interview with Stereogum that "we were the driving force behind the music and made all the decisions." He also states that three of the album's four singles, "My Own Prison", "Torn" and "What's This Life For" immediately stood out to them and were the band's favourite songs from the album. Stapp and Tremonti wrote "What's This Life For" about one of their friends who had died by suicide. The music and lyrics were written by Tremonti, while Stapp contributed the lyrics to the bridge portion of the song.

Prior to entering the recording studio, producer John Kurzweg stated that the songs were either all finished or 90 percent finished by the time the band entered "The Kitchen Studio", Kurzweg's home studio in Tallahassee, Florida to begin demo recording sessions. Recording sessions would continue at Criteria Studios in Miami with the band being on a pay-as-you-go agreement at the time, with each member pitching in around $100 a week and then entering the studio to continue recording. The music was recorded using a digital tape machine and after six months of recording and a mere $6,000 budget the band had finished recording the Blue Collar Records version of My Own Prison. Creed would soon find themselves signed to Wind-up Records who wanted the band to re-record the entire album after finding out Kurzweg used an ADAT's machine, however the band and Wind-up would eventually reach a compromise after realizing the recording process wasn't working out. The band instead was told to remix the album and were matched up with mixer Ron St. Germain, who along with Kurzweg, helped Creed remix the album at Long View Farm Studios in Massachusetts.

== Music and lyrics ==
Inspired by the suicides of their friends, the lyrics, written by Tremonti and Stapp, deal with the difficulties in finding happiness and meaning in the world. In an interview with Songfacts Tremonti said: "It's a song about suicide and kids searching for that meaning of life. It's tough sometimes for kids in high school, junior high school, to go through a lot of the depression he went through that led him to commit suicide. So I wrote about that." It is the only Creed song to use profanity. The first half of the word "goddamn" is censored on the shortened 2004 Greatest Hits album version. Musically, the song is a power ballad, written in the key of G major with Tremonti playing in G5. Like most of the tracks on the album it borrows heavily from the Seattle grunge scene as well elements of a more mainstream hard rock and arena metal sound.

== Music video ==
Three music videos were made for the song and were all directed by Ramaa Mosley, who would also direct the video for the band's breakthrough single "Higher". The official version of the video was filmed in southern Los Angeles near Joshua Tree National Park. Mosley, who had a fascination with weather, looked to capture the power and mystery of it by pitting "men against the forces of nature". Mosley said: "I had this tremendous fascination with weather and trying to capture this on film. Weather is very mysterious and powerful and I wanted to make a video that set men against the forces of nature. I wanted the video for Creed to feel that the music and the band had performed so passionately that a storm approached." The video features the band performing the song in the desert plains along with scenes of various disaffected people trying to escape their lives. Each band member can be seen in each one of the scenes watching on as the alienated people struggle to cope with their discontent. As the band begins playing the song people can be seen wandering into the desert to join them. When the second chorus kicks in a sudden wind storm hits causing the desert sands to fly all around the band and the spectators. This effect was created using giant fans. During the bridge, the video shifts over to a nighttime setting. At this point the various people from each scene also begin to join the band in the desert where they all exult under a rain shower and falling snow. The rain effect was created using a rain machine while the snow was made using soap flakes.

A second version was made for the film Halloween H20: 20 Years Later. It features many of the same scenes from the official version and incorporates scenes from the film as well. However, this video also features the extended guitar intro of the Blue Collar Records version of "What's This Life For" that was eventually cut from the Wind-up Records release.

The third version is a live performance of the band from February 18, 1998, at Lee's Palace in Toronto. This is also the same show where the band filmed the music video for their previous single "Torn".

Actress and comic Melinda Hill appears in the music video as "the blonde girl in the Creed video."

== Release and reception ==
Released on June 9, 1998, as the third single from My Own Prison, "What's This Life For" would peak at number one on the Billboard Hot Mainstream Rock Tracks chart for six consecutive weeks from September 19, 1998, to October 24. It was the band first number one song on the chart, and was eventually knocked off the top spot by "Psycho Circus" by Kiss on October 31. The song also managed to reach the top ten on the Alternative Airplay chart and number six on the Canada Rock/Alternative (RPM) chart.

== Appearances in media ==
The song appeared in the 1998 film Halloween H20: 20 Years Later. Creed also performed "What's This Life For" as the closing song to their setlist at Woodstock '99. Robby Krieger, guitarist of the Doors, also played the song with the band, as well as two cover songs of the Doors, "Riders on the Storm" and "Roadhouse Blues".

== Chart performance ==
Chart (1998)	Peak position
Canada Rock/Alternative (RPM)	6
US Mainstream Rock (Billboard)	1
US Alternative Airplay (Billboard)	10

=== Year-end charts ===
Chart (1998)	Peak position
US Mainstream Rock (Billboard)	5
US Modern Rock (Billboard)	31

Chart (1999)	Peak position
US Mainstream Rock (Billboard)	33
