= Rain (Creed song) =

2009 single by Creed

Single by Creed

from the album Full Circle
- Released: October 6, 2009
- Length: 3:27 (album version); 3:19 (pop mix)
- Label: Wind-up
- Songwriters: Scott Stapp; Mark Tremonti
- Producer: Howard Benson

Creed singles chronology
"Overcome" (2009)	"Rain" (2009)	"A Thousand Faces" (2010)

Music video
- "Rain" on YouTube

"Rain" is a song written and performed by American rock band Creed. It is the second single from their fourth album, Full Circle (2009).

The song premiered on MSN Music on September 22, 2009, and was released as a digital download on October 6, 2009. It debuted and peaked at number 91 on the Billboard Hot 100, and reached number 34 on the Mainstream Top 40 airplay chart, becoming their first entry on the latter chart since "One Last Breath" in 2002. In Australia, "Rain" reached number 52 on the ARIA Singles Chart, spending 13 weeks in the top 100.

The music video premiered on VH1 on October 27, 2009.

== Charts ==
Chart (2009–2010)	Peak position
Australia (ARIA)	52
US Billboard Hot 100	91
US Adult Pop Airplay (Billboard)	25
US Pop Airplay (Billboard)	34
