= Full Circle (Creed album) =

Studio album by Creed
- Released: October 27, 2009
- Recorded: 2009
- Studios: Bay 7 Studios (Valley Village, California); Sparky Dark Studio (Calabasas, California)
- Genres: Alternative metal; post-grunge; hard rock
- Length: 50:40
- Label: Wind-up
- Producer: Howard Benson

Creed chronology
Greatest Hits (2004)	Full Circle (2009)	With Arms Wide Open: A Retrospective (2015)

Singles from Full Circle
- 1. "Overcome" Released: August 25, 2009; 2. "Rain" Released: October 6, 2009; 3. "A Thousand Faces" Released: January 11, 2010 (radio)

Full Circle is the fourth studio album by American rock band Creed, released on October 27, 2009. It was Creed's first release since disbanding in June 2004, prior to the release of their Greatest Hits compilation album in November 2004, and was their first studio album since Weathered in November 2001, as well as their first with their original bass guitarist Brian Marshall since his departure in August 2000. The record was produced by Howard Benson. The album was completed on July 31, 2009, as announced by Scott Stapp. The album cover was revealed through the band's official e-news on August 4, 2009. A two-disc version of Full Circle was released and contained a DVD with bonus content. The album had three music videos created for it: "Overcome" and "Rain" in 2009 and "A Thousand Faces" in 2010.

== Title ==
The title of the album makes reference to the instrumental band members coming "full circle" with Scott Stapp to reform the band. The title track is about the Creed reunion and how it feels to be together as a band again.

== Tour ==
The 2009 Creed Reunion Tour began on August 6 in Pittsburgh, Pennsylvania, and concluded on October 20, 2009, in Hidalgo, Texas. Originally, Flyleaf and Fuel were to be the opening bands, but the New Zealand band Like A Storm and Hoobastank opened for Creed in the first leg of the concert, while Lo-Pro and Staind opened for the second leg, with Saliva doing the last five dates and Like a Storm returning near the end of the tour. This reunion tour featured all of the original members of the band as well as the former Submersed guitarist Eric Friedman, a friend of Mark Tremonti's who performed rhythm guitars and backing vocals. The band played five songs ("Overcome", "Rain", "Bread of Shame", "Full Circle" and "A Thousand Faces") from their album Full Circle, as well as old hits throughout the tour. The band later went on to play "Suddenly" during their 2010 Summer tour, and "Time" during their 2012 Summer tour.

On October 24, 2009, it was confirmed by Scott Phillips that Creed was to go on a world tour in April 2010, starting in Australia and New Zealand, followed by South America, Europe and Canada/North America. The tour dates were released on April 19, 2010.

== Reception ==
Professional ratings
Review scores
Source	Rating
About.com	2/5 stars
AllMusic	2/5 stars
Classic Rock	6/10 stars
Entertainment Weekly	B
IGN	(6.9/10)
The Metal Forge	8/10 stars
Rock Hard	8/10 stars
Soundsphere	4/5 stars

The album received mixed to positive reviews from critics. Some critics stated that they appreciated the "new, heavier, darker side of Creed". Full Circle debuted at number two on the Billboard 200, selling 111,000 copies in its first week.

== Track listing ==
=== Original release ===
All lyrics are written by Scott Stapp; all music is composed by Mark Tremonti.

No.	Title	Length
1.	"Overcome"	3:46
2.	"Bread of Shame"	3:56
3.	"A Thousand Faces"	4:54
4.	"Suddenly"	3:31
5.	"Rain"	3:28
6.	"Away in Silence"	4:40
7.	"Fear"	4:05
8.	"On My Sleeve"	4:14
9.	"Full Circle"	4:08
10.	"Time"	5:55
11.	"Good Fight"	3:55
12.	"The Song You Sing"	4:08
Total length:		50:40

U.K. edition bonus track
No.	Title	Length
13.	"Silent Teacher"	3:44
Total length:		54:24

=== Bonus DVD ===
1. "Reconnection: 6 Years Later"
2. "Building the Tour: Concept and Design"
3. "The First Show: Night 1 – Pittsburgh"
4. "Full Circle"
5. "Making the Record: Full Circle is Born"
6. "E-Rock: Touring Guitarist"
7. "The Set List"
8. "Running the Tour: Production Crew"
9. "Overcome: The Video"

== Personnel ==
Creed

- Scott Stapp – lead vocals
- Mark Tremonti – guitar, backing vocals, co-lead vocals on "A Thousand Faces" and "Away in Silence"
- Brian Marshall – bass
- Scott Phillips – drums

Production

- Howard Benson – production, keyboards and programming
- Mike Plotnikoff – recording
- Paul DeCarli – digital editing
- Hatsukazu Inagaki – additional engineering
- Jeremy Underwood, Keith Armstrong, Nik Karpen, Brad Townsend, Andrew Schubert – assistant engineering
- Marc VanGool and Ian Keith – guitar tech
- Tony Adams – drum tech
- Chris Lord-Alge – mixing at Mix LA, Tarzana, CA
- Ted Jensen – mastering at Sterling Sound, New York, NY

Management

- Irving Azoff, Paul Geary, Jared Paul – management
- Orville Almon (Zumwait, Almon & Hayes) – legal representation
- Scott Adair and John Doran (London & Co.) – business management
- Ken Fermaglich (The Agency Group) – US booking agent
- Neil Warnock (The Agency Group) – international booking agent
- Diana Meltzer – A&R
- Gregg Wattenberg – A&R/Wind-up production supervision
- Jim Cooperman and Kim Youngberg – business affairs
- Mike Mongillo – product management

Artwork

- Daniel Tremonti (Core 12) – art concept, package design, photography
- Paul Natkin – band photography

DVD

- DC3 – footage provider
- Daniel E. Catullo III – DVD footage director
- Michael Romanyshyn, Lionel Pasamonte, Daniel E. Catullo III – producers
- Jonathan Fambrough and Michael Romanyshyn – editors
- Emmanuel Perez – assistant editor
- Mark Droescher – DVD author

== Charts ==
=== Weekly charts ===
Weekly chart performance for Full Circle
Chart (2009)	Peak position
Canadian Albums (Billboard)	8
US Billboard 200	2
US Top Alternative Albums (Billboard)	1
US Top Hard Rock Albums (Billboard)	1
US Top Rock Albums (Billboard)	1
US Indie Store Album Sales (Billboard)	10

=== Year-end charts ===
2009 year-end chart performance for Full Circle
Chart (2009)	Position
US Billboard 200	181
US Top Rock Albums (Billboard)	42

2010 year-end chart performance for Full Circle
Chart (2010)	Position
US Billboard 200	191

== Release history ==
Release dates and formats for Full Circle
Region	Release date	Label
United States	October 27, 2009	Wind-up
Australia	November 7, 2009	Wind-up
