= Overcome (Creed song) =

Single by Creed

from the album Full Circle
- Released: August 25, 2009
- Recorded: June – July 2009
- Studio: Nashville, Tennessee
- Genre: Alternative metal
- Length: 3:47
- Label: Wind-up
- Songwriters: Scott Stapp; Mark Tremonti
- Producer: Howard Benson

Creed singles chronology
"Weathered" (2002)	"Overcome" (2009)	"Rain" (2009)

Music video
- "Overcome" on YouTube

"Overcome" is a song written and performed by Creed. At the time of its release, it was their first single since 2002 and the first from their 2009 reunion album, Full Circle. To date, it is their 11th song to reach the top five on the Billboard Mainstream Rock chart.

== Lyrics ==
"Overcome" was said to be written in reference to an event where rapper T.I. had saved Creed lead singer Scott Stapp from committing suicide, but Stapp said in Loudwire's Wikipedia: Fact or Fiction interview that it was actually about his desire to overcome the struggles and the demons that he had been fighting for many years. In his uncensored memoir, "Sinner's Creed", the full story of this so-called "suicide attempt" is written in great detail.

== Music video ==
The music video was shot at their concert on August 18, 2009, at the Xfinity Center in Mansfield, Massachusetts, and premiered on Tuesday, September 15, 2009, on Yahoo Music, one day earlier than expected. It is only the second non-conceptual Creed video (the first being "Higher") and contains not only live footage but also candid shots of the band backstage.

== Release and reception ==
"Overcome" premiered on Creed's website on August 19, 2009, and was released for digital download on August 25, 2009, as the lead single to Full Circle, and the band's first single since 2002's "Weathered". It debuted at number 18 on the Billboard Mainstream Rock Tracks chart, peaking at number 4. It also reached number 73 on the Billboard Hot 100.

== Charts ==
=== Weekly charts ===
Weekly chart performance for "Overcome"
Chart (2009)	Peak position
Canada Rock (Billboard)	18
US Billboard Hot 100	73
US Hot Rock & Alternative Songs (Billboard)	8

=== Year-end charts ===
Year-end chart performance for "Overcome"
Chart (2009)	Position
US Hot Rock Songs (Billboard)	49
