= My Own Prison (song) =

Single by Creed

from the album My Own Prison
- Released: 1997
- Studio: The Kitchen Studio (Tallahassee, Florida); Criteria Studios (Miami, Florida)
- Genre: Post-grunge
- Length: 4:59 (album version); 4:14 (radio edit)
- Label: Wind-up
- Songwriters: Scott Stapp; Mark Tremonti

Creed singles chronology
"My Own Prison" (1997)	"Torn" (1998)

Music video
- "My Own Prison" on YouTube

"My Own Prison" is a song by American rock band Creed and the titular lead single from their 1997 debut album of the same name. It first appeared on the WXSR-FM compilation album Locals Only and would prove to be the band's breakout hit. The single peaked at number two on the Billboard Mainstream Rock Tracks chart.

== Writing and recording ==
"My Own Prison" is one of Creed's earliest written songs. Prior to writing the song, the band had written about half a dozen other songs as they were in the process of trying to find their identity. The band wrote a song called "Grip My Soul", which was never recorded or released, but after a rehearsal vocalist Scott Stapp recalls that he and the band felt that they had finally found their musical style. It was soon after this that "My Own Prison" was written. Stapp wrote in his memoir, Sinner's Creed, that in a way, "Grip My Soul" was a prelude to what would become "My Own Prison". As with all Creed songs, the lyrics were composed by Stapp and the music was written entirely by guitarist Mark Tremonti. Stapp said about writing the title track: "One night I woke up about 3 a.m. or 4 a.m. from a dream and I just wrote it all down," Stapp said. "I didn't know it was a song at the time. A few days later I called [guitarist] Mark [Tremonti], he had been putting together some music, and we sat down and got the song together in about 30 minutes."

The band originally demoed the song, along with the rest of their songs, at their producer John Kurzweg's house, which was called "The Kitchen Studio", in Tallahassee, Florida, and Criteria Studios in Miami, Florida, for $6,000. During the original recording sessions, which were recorded analog directly to tape, the first song that was tracked was "My Own Prison". This final cut from these sessions would appear on the Blue Collar Records release of My Own Prison. However, after the band was picked up and signed to Wind-up Records, the song, along with the entire album was remixed by Ron St. Germain at the Long View Farm recording studio in Massachusetts.

== Music and lyrics ==
Stapp was inspired to write the lyrics to 'My Own Prison' based on his experiences when he left his home at the age of 17 to enroll in "the school of hard knocks," Stapp said, and it was in the latter days during this education that Stapp decided he would "take responsibility" for his actions. Stapp said the song relates to his discovery that he "couldn't blame others for the walls constricting my life. 'My Own Prison' was the consequences for my bad decisions. It was my own fault that I did shitty in school, that I got fired from my job, that I was living in my car. I had to grow up."

Stapp also said in his memoir that his Christian upbringing played a huge part in inspiring him to write the song due to the guilt that he felt from not measuring up to the God presented to him by his father and the rebellion that followed in his teenage years. He felt it was both logical and amazing that his experiences came out in the form of a rock song. Logical in that his view, music is rebellious in its very nature, and that rock is rooted in challenging the rules and social norms of the previous generation. But amazing because in spite of this rebellion, the song confirmed to Stapp that it was "the Man on the cross, the Lion of Judah, who held the key to my freedom". Stapp felt that the song was the most significant metaphor for his life in that it was with the band from the beginning and would prove prophetic in the decades that followed.

The song is written in the key of F major, and begins with a somber tone led by guitarist Tremonti, who plays in drop D tuning. Live The pre-chorus sees Tremonti share vocal duties with Stapp as Tremonti sings the main lyrics while Stapp sings "And I said oh" on backing vocals. As the tension and intensity build, Stapp powers the back half of the song with his vocal work at the beginning of the chorus, where he sings, "Should have been dead on a Sunday morning, banging my head, No time for mourning, Ain't got no time", followed by the pre-chorus once again. During the bridge, Stapp cries out "I cry out to God, seeking only His decision, Gabriel stands and confirms, I've created my own prison". A third pre-chorus is then repeated three times with Stapp repeating the words "I created, I created, I created, I created, I created, I created my own prison" during the final pre-chorus. The song ends with Stapp singing the lyrics to the chorus once again as the music begins to slow down in tempo and slowly fade out following the final note.

== Cover art ==
The cover art for the single is simply a recoloured version of the album artwork, with the only difference being the title placement now appearing at the bottom within a black bar instead of just under and to the right of the band's wordmark logo.

== Music video ==
The music video was produced by Toronto-based production company Black Walk, and was directed by Stephen Scott. The video received a great deal of airplay on MTV as well as MuchMusic.

== Release and reception ==
Stapp recalls the first time he heard "My Own Prison" during the band's radio debut. The members of Creed were at Daniel Tremonti's house, brother of Mark Tremonti, and they had invited a few girls from Florida State University when suddenly the DJ on the radio said: "There's this band around town called Creed. You know them. They've been making a lot of noise lately. They've built up quite a following, and now they've recorded their first album, My Own Prison. I'm guessing that right now they're sitting at home trying to impress some of their FSU lady friends. I'm gonna help them out and make their little dream come true. So Tallahassee, here's your hometown boys—here's Creed with their radio debut, "My Own Prison"." Soon after the release of My Own Prison, the title track began being played on the locals-only radio show in Tallahassee, Florida. Another radio station in a nearby city in Georgia started playing the album's song "Pity for a Dime". The band were asked to perform a show there and there were around 5,000 to 6,000 people. Soon after, the title track began playing on radio outside the Georgia and Florida area.

"My Own Prison" was the band's first ever single to be released and the lead single to their debut album of the same name. Because Creed's singles were not initially sold in the United States, they were ineligible for the US Billboard Hot 100. The single managed to peak at number 54 on the US Billboard Hot 100 Airplay chart in March 1998. The song also managed to find success on the Billboard Mainstream Rock Tracks chart as well as the Modern Rock Tracks chart. The song peaked at number two on the former for the week of November 8, 1997, where it would remain for nine consecutive weeks, being kept off the top stop by "Touch, Peel and Stand" by Days of the New. It also finished at number 2 on the 1998 year-end chart. On the latter chart, the song managed to reach number seven for the week of April 18, 1998.

Internationally, "My Own Prison" peaked at number 9 on the Canada Rock/Alternative (RPM) chart and number 45 on the Canada Top Singles (RPM) chart.

It is the band's most-played song live having been performed over 302 times over the span of their career.

== Appearances in media ==
"My Own Prison" was performed live by the band at the 27th Annual American Music Awards on January 17, 2000. The song was featured in the 2002 film Bang Bang You're Dead. The song was made available as downloadable content for the video game Rocksmith 2014 on September 16, 2014, as part of the "Creed 5-Song Pack".

== Track listing ==
1. "My Own Prison" (radio edit) – 4:12
2. "My Own Prison" (acoustic edit) – 4:33
3. "Torn" (live) – 6:24

== Charts ==
Chart (1997–98)	Peak position
Canada Rock/Alternative (RPM)	9
Canada Top Singles (RPM)	45
US Alternative Airplay (Billboard)	7
US Mainstream Rock (Billboard)	2
US Radio Songs (Billboard)	54

=== Year-end charts ===
Chart (1997)	Peak position
US Mainstream Rock (Billboard)	36

Chart (1998)	Peak position
US Mainstream Rock (Billboard)	2
US Modern Rock (Billboard)	16

== Certifications ==
Certifications and sales for "My Own Prison"
Region	Certification	Certified units/sales
New Zealand (RMNZ)	Gold	15,000^{‡}
^{‡} Sales+streaming figures based on certification alone.
