= Denny DeMarchi =

Canadian musician (1962–2020)

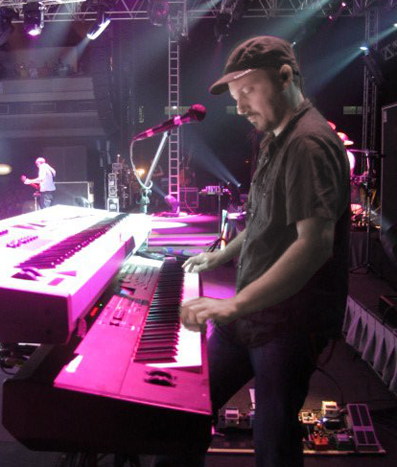
- DeMarchi in 2010

Background information
- Born: 28 November 1962; Toronto, Ontario, Canada
- Died: 15 May 2020 (aged 57)
- Genres: Rock, alternative rock, indie rock, modern rock
- Occupations: Musician, vocalist, songwriter
- Instruments: Vocals, keyboards, Hammond organ, guitar, flute
- Years active: 1990–2020
- Label: Indie
- Website: www.myspace.com/dennydemarchi

Denny DeMarchi (28 November 1962 – 15 May 2020) was a Canadian musician best known as a keyboardist and singer-songwriter. He was also a guitarist, backing vocalist, audio engineer and record producer. DeMarchi played with the Irish band the Cranberries during their reunion tour (2009–11), and also performed with Dolores O'Riordan as her keyboardist and guitarist during her solo world tour in 2007. He played the signature keyboard notes for the 1990 No. 1 Billboard hit song "More Than Words Can Say" by the band Alias, which features his brother, Steve on guitar.

== Career ==
=== 1990s Alias ===
In the mid 80s, DeMarchi helped his brother Steve and their good friend Freddy Curci build the sound recording studio, Platinum Sound, out of the DeMarchi family basement where most of the songs on the Alias album were written and recorded. He was also involved with some of the production and engineering work for that album.

DeMarchi was the keyboardist and backing vocalist for the 1990 No. 1 Billboard hit song More Than Words Can Say from the ALIAS album. He also co-wrote the last song in the Alias album, "Standing in the Darkness".

DeMarchi played keyboard, bass and did some of the production and engineering work for the 1994 Freddy Curci Dreamer's Road album. He co-wrote and produced the song "Diamonds" in this album.

=== 2007–2008 Musician for Dolores O'Riordan's Solo Albums and World Tour ===
DeMarchi and his older brother Steve are old friends of Don Burton, Dolores O'Riordan's husband. On a visit to Burton and O'Riordan's family home in Canada, DeMarchi played on O'Riordan's piano, DeMarchi's talent on the piano impressed O'Riordan so much that she decided to hire DeMarchi as her keyboardist for her solo project.

DeMarchi was the keyboardist for Dolores O'Riordan's solo albums Are You Listening? and No Baggage. In 2007 he also toured with Dolores O'Riordan on her solo world tour. In May 2007, DeMarchi along with other band members, were featured with O'Riordan in live performances on the Carson Daly Show, The Tonight Show with Jay Leno, True Music on HDnet cable network TV, and on Heaven and Earth BBC Manchester.

Dolores O'Riordan won a European Border Breakers Award in 2008. DeMarchi supported O'Riordan on keyboard and as backing vocalist at the award ceremony at Midem 2008, Cannes, France – 27 Jan 2008.

=== 2009–2011 tour musician for the Cranberries ===
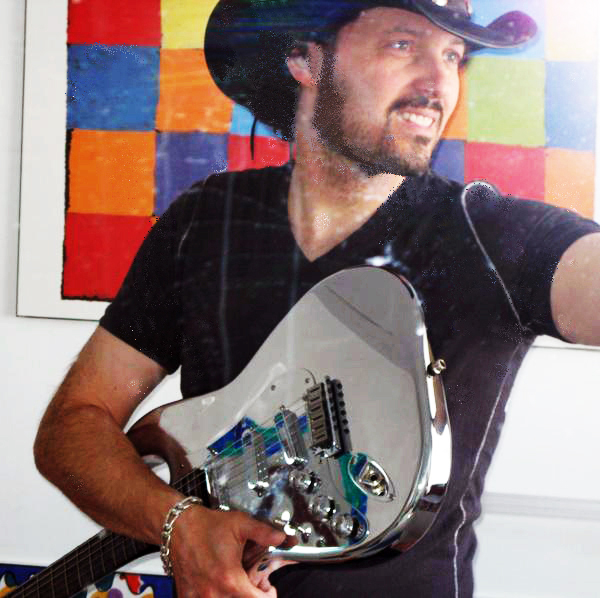
DeMarchi in 2009

DeMarchi toured with the Cranberries as their keyboard/guitar player and backing vocalist on their world tour, performing at major concert venues across the United States; Canada; South America; Europe and Asia.

DeMarchi was the opening act for the Cranberries On 5 July 2010 in Rome at the Roma Rock Festival, one of the premier events on the European summer music festival scene. DeMarchi opened the show with 8 songs from his own Rockizoid solo project.

On 28 August 2009. DeMarchi accompanied Dolores O'Riordan in a Live performance on CBC Radio in Toronto Ontario Canada. Dolores O'Riordan joined guest host Jesse Wente live in Studio Q to talk about her second solo album release, No Baggage, and the reunion of the Cranberries with plans for a world tour in mid November 2009. Dolores O'Riordan introduced DeMarchi on the radio show as her keyboarder. They performed the songs "Linger", "It's You" and "Zombie" between interviews with other guests on the show. One of the guests was Walter Koenig, who played Pavel Chekov from Star Trek.

=== 2012 Producing/engineering Killer Bee album ===
Aside from being an experienced musician, DeMarchi has also shown a keen interest in audio engineering and music production projects. His latest engineering and collaborative production endeavors from his recording studio, Denny DeMarchi Studios, produced an album titled From Hell and Back by a Swedish/Canadian hard rock band Killer Bee. DeMarchi was also the keyboard and rhythm guitar player on this album, which was released by an English record label Z-Records on 22 October 2012.

== Solo Projects ==
As a singer/songwriter, DeMarchi engaged in writing and recording his own music under the name Rockizoid (2007–2010) and under the band name HedRek which he formed in 2011. DeMarchi has written over 200 songs in an ongoing personal musical pursuit. He has started recording work, whenever time permitted, on a small portion of his portfolio of songs and has released 10 tracks on his MySpace profile's music player.

DeMarchi's music is explorative rock with a strong sense of groove and identifiable lyrics. "A song should be able to stand on its own by singing and playing it on one instrument. If it feels good doing that, then it's worth recording".

In July 2009, DeMarchi's song "All Your Fault", released in May 2009, entered the Fame Games Radio and within three weeks quickly advanced to the 233 Wednesday edition of the quarter-final Show, with ranking of Number 2 and 233 edition of the semi-final show, with ranking of Number 3 which were aired on radio nationwide in the United States on the Citadel Media (formerly the ABC radio) networks in mid August 2009.

== Personal life ==
DeMarchi was born in Toronto. His parents immigrated to Ontario, Canada, from Italy. DeMarchi was an executive of a company that services the Dental Industry in the greater Toronto, Ontario area. His personal hobbies/recreation included riding the ATV, snowmobiling, boating and riding his unicycle.

== Death ==
On 15 May 2020, website iHeartRadio reported that DeMarchi had died from cancer.

== Discography ==
=== Alias ===
- Alias (1990)
- Never Say Never (2009)

=== With Freddy Curci ===
- Dreamer's Road, (1994)

=== With Dolores O'Riordan ===
- Are You Listening? (2007)
- No Baggage (2009)

=== With Killer Bee ===
- Hell and Back, (2012)
