= Sheriff (album) =

Studio album by Sheriff
- Released: 27 November 1982
- Recorded: 1982
- Studios: Perceptions Recording Studio (Toronto, Ontario, Canada)
- Genre: Rock
- Length: 37:21
- Label: Capitol
- Producers: Stacy Heydon; John Victor (exec); Helen Victor (exec)

Sheriff chronology
Sheriff (1982)	Sheriff Live (1983)

Singles from Sheriff
- 1. "You Remind Me" Released: 1982; 2. "When I'm with You" Released: 1983; 1988

Professional ratings
Review scores
Source	Rating
Allmusic	3.5/5 stars

Sheriff is the only album by Canadian band Sheriff, released by Capitol Records on 27 November 1982. The single "When I'm with You" jumped to the top of the Billboard Hot 100 in 1989, seven years after its original release.

== Track listing ==
All songs were written by Arnold Lanni, except where noted.

Side one
No.	Title	Writer(s)	Length
1.	"You Remind Me"		3:50
2.	"California"		3:59
3.	"Makin' My Way"		3:22
4.	"When I'm with You"		3:58
5.	"Kept Me Coming"	Steve DeMarchi; Lanni	3:06

Side two
No.	Title	Writer(s)	Length
1.	"Mama's Baby"		5:06
2.	"Crazy Without You"	DeMarchi; Lanni	3:48
3.	"Elisa"		3:14
4.	"Living for a Dream"		4:06
5.	"Give Me Rock 'N' Roll"		2:52
Total length:			37:21

== Personnel ==
Sheriff

- Freddy Curci – lead vocals
- Arnold Lanni – keyboards, guitars, vocals
- Steve DeMarchi – guitars, vocals
- Wolf Hassel – bass, vocals
- Rob Elliott – drums

Additional backing vocals

- Doug Baynham
- Brian Gagnon
- Frank La Magna

== Production ==
- Helen Victor – executive producer
- John Victor – executive producer
- Stacy Heydon – producer
- Greg Roberts – engineer
- Alyx Skriabow – assistant engineer
- Dave Wittman – mixing at Electric Lady Studios (New York City, New York, USA)
- Ed Garcia – mix assistant
- Michel Sauvage – mix assistant
- Bob Ludwig – mastering at Masterdisk (New York City, New York, USA)
- Dave Elliott – art direction
- Dean Motter – design
- Deborah Samuel – photography
- Alexander/McKeown/Grego Management – management

== Charts ==
Chart (1982)	Peak position
Canada Top Albums/CDs (RPM)	44
US Billboard 200	60

== Certifications ==
Region	Certification	Certified units/sales
Canada (Music Canada)	Gold	50,000^{^}
^{^} Shipments figures based on certification alone.
