= Urgent (Canadian band) =

Canadian rock band (1982–1984)

- Origin: Toronto, Ontario, Canada
- Genres: Heavy metal Hard rock AOR
- Years active: 1982–1984
- Labels: Epic; Long Island
- Past members: Doug Baynham; Kim Hunt; Wayne Siberry; Glen Johansen

Urgent was a Canadian rock band formed in 1982 in Toronto, Ontario.

== History ==
Sharing the name of a band from New York, the Canadian band Urgent was from Toronto, Ontario, Canada and formed when drummer Kim Hunt left the band Zon in 1982 and connected with bassist Doug Baynham and guitarist Wayne Siberry. With Baynham also handling the majority of the vocal duties, they wrote and practiced daily, practically living in the studio for three months. Keyboardist John McGoldrick was added for touring purposes and they quickly established themselves as one of the hotter new heavy acts on the Ontario circuit, and it wasn't long before they were playing shows across the country – catching the attention of Epic Records execs along the way. They submitted a three-song demo tape to Epic Records and signed a deal in the spring of 1983.

Oshawa's Glen Johansen (Ronnie Hawkins, Eddy Grant, Nash the Slash, Martha & The Muffins and FM) was brought in to produce the album and the result was a keyboard-dominated metal sound with a thunderous backbeat and tight guitar solos and glossy edge. Recorded at Johansen's Toronto studio Integrated Sound, guest appearances on the LP included guitarist Stacy Heydon (Teenage Head, Iggy Pop, David Bowie) and Sheriff and Frozen Ghost's Arnold Lanni on synthesizers.

== Recording career ==
In 1994, Long Island Records re-mastered and re-issued Timing for the first time on CD in a special numbered edition, limited to 2000 copies worldwide. It featured a gold CD, a jewel case with gold stamped lettering, a poster with history and a new, expanded booklet with lyrics.

== Members ==
- Doug Baynham − All vocals, bass guitar
- Kim Hunt − Drums and percussion
- Wayne Siberry − All guitars
- Glen Johansen − Keyboards and synthesizers

=== Guest musicians ===
- Stacy Heydon - Guitar solo on "You're Not The One"
- Arnold Lanni − Keyboards on "Killer Love"

== Discography ==
=== Albums ===
- Timing (1983, re-issued 1994)

Track listing (All songs written by Doug Baynham, Wayne Siberry and Kim Hunt)

1. Killer Love (3:20)
2. Degan (Love You, Leave You) (4:52)
3. You're Not The One (3:22)
4. Cat On The Prowl (4:07)
5. Midnight Lover (3:33)
6. Keeper Of My Heart (4:04)
7. Bad News (4:13)
8. I'll Find A Way (3:43)
9. Too Hot To Handle (3:34)

=== Singles ===
- "You're Not The One" / "Too Hot To Handle" – 7" PS (1984)
