= Brett Walker =

American singer-songwriter

Carl Brett Walker (November 14, 1961 – July 8, 2013) was an American songwriter, musician, and record producer.

Walker was involved in music publishing on TV and film. As singer-songwriter, musician, and publisher Walker's music was heard on over 300 network television shows, including One Life to Live, All My Children, The Young and the Restless, One Tree Hill, Felicity, CSI: Miami, Everwood, Malcolm in the Middle, Baywatch, Sex and the City and National Lampoon's Barely Legal.

== Life and career ==
Walker was born in Norman, Oklahoma, United States. At the age of 21, he moved to Los Angeles, California, where he worked as a songwriter and collaborated with a number of artists and songwriters, including Jimi Jamison (of Survivor), Nick Gilder, Jonathan Cain (Journey), Russ Ballard, Carl Dixon and Alias featuring Freddy Curci.

In 1991, Walker co-wrote the song "Waiting for Love" for the band Alias on EMI Capitol Records, and it went on to become Walker's first top-10 international hit. The Alias CD earned platinum sales throughout the world, and the song "Waiting for Love" received a BMI Award for top radio airplay that year.

Walker's first solo record, Nevertheless, released in 1994, launching his solo career in Europe. David Prater produced four songs from the CD, the rest was produced by Walker or co-written and produced by Jonathan Cain. The CD was released on Empire Records in Europe and Japan, and reached the top-40 national sales charts in Scandinavia. Nevertheless, was again released in 2012 on Dive Bomb Records.

Walker's latest album, Straight Jacket Vacation, produced by Walker and Weston Hodges, was released through AOR Heaven in August 2013.

Walker died at his home in Draper Utah on July 8, 2013, at the age of 51.

He leaves behind his widow and three children from his previous marriage (divorced 2007).

== Discography ==
- 1990 – "Stranger" as Michael Thompson Band Geffen Records
- 1991 – "Waiting for Love" with Alias EMI Capitol Records (BMI Award-winning Top 10 single)
- 1992 – "Taste of Love" with Jimi Jamison Scotti Bros Records (Billboard AOR top 50 hit) Also available on Jimi Jamison/Survivor's Greatest Hits Volume 2 / Scotti Brothers Records.
- 1993 – "After the Tears" with Jeff Paris Now And Then Records
- 1993 – "Taste of Love" with Carl Dixon available Carl Dixon's "One" album AOR Records Germany
- 1994 – Nevertheless- Brett Walker (solo album) Empire Records Scandinavia / Toshiba EMI Japan Scandinavian Top-40 National Sales Charts / with Top 10 radio hit
- 1994 – Snakes in Paradise (co-wrote five songs and produced the album) with Snakes in Paradise / Toshiba EMI Japan / Various labels in Europe
- 1996 – Brett Walker & The Railbirds- Brett Walker (solo album) Intersound Records / Westcoast Sony Scandinavia (Top 40 Radio Hit in Sweden and Denmark)
- 1997 – West Coast Radio Hits Rock- Brett Walker & The Railbirds "Drown In Your Ocean", "What's Still Left", "Yesterday Has Gone", "Tell Me Why", "American Dreamer" Westcoast Records Compilation CD / Westcoast/SGA Europe
- 1997 – West Coast Radio Hits Rock- (Walker Zapper Overdrive) "Silver And Gold" (bonus track-previously unreleased) Westcoast Records Compilation CD / Westcoast/SGA Europe
- 1997 – West Coast Radio Hits Love- Brett Walker & The Railbirds "It's A Good Thing", "Everything I Want" Westcoast Records Compilation CD / Westcoast/SGA Europe
- 1999 – The Best American Rock Anthems In The World Ever-Part 1- "Lecia" Greatest AOR Hits Compilation CD / Virgin Records Sweden
- 2000 – Lift Off- Brett Walker (solo CD) MTM Records
- 2003 - Something So Real- Brett Walker/Scott Kovarik, Barely Legal 2003 Soundtrack
- 2007 – Spirit Junky- Brett Walker (solo CD) NL Distribution
- 2011 – Best Out Of Three- Brett Walker (solo CD) Walker Music Group, LLC
- 2011 – Rock For Japan- "Good Enough" (Walker Music Group, LLC) AOR Heaven compilation CD Charity Project for Japan Earthquake Victims
- 2012 – Melodic Rock Volume 9, 15 Years Later- "What About You" (Walker Music Group, LLC) Compilation CD Melodic Rock Records
- 2012 – Nevertheless- (2012 remastered release) Divebomb Records
- 2013 – Straight Jacket Vacation- (Walker Music Group, LLC) AOR Heaven

== Television appearances ==
Walker's TV appearances included American Bandstand, HBO, MTV VH-1, Good Morning Sweden.
