= One Man Army (song) =

1999 single by Our Lady Peace

Single by Our Lady Peace

from the album Happiness... Is Not a Fish That You Can Catch
- Released: July 30, 1999
- Length: 3:22; 3:08 (radio edit)
- Label: Columbia
- Songwriters: Raine Maida; Arnold Lanni
- Producer: Arnold Lanni

Our Lady Peace singles chronology
"4am" (1997)	"One Man Army" (1999)	"Is Anybody Home?" (2000)

Music video
- "One Man Army" on YouTube

"One Man Army" (often mistakenly called "Falling") is a song by Canadian alternative rock band Our Lady Peace. It was released in July 1999 as the lead single from their third album, Happiness... Is Not a Fish That You Can Catch.

== Content ==
Raine Maida stated that the song is about "the struggle for individuality. It's about finding the courage to metaphorically strip naked and set fire to all your inhibitions. It's about cleansing yourself of all the people and things that suffocate your individuality."

== Release ==
The release of the live version of "One Man Army" from their Woodstock 1999 performance forced the record label to service the single to Canadian radio on July 30, 1999, ahead of its planned date of August 4.

== Music video ==
This music video was directed by Mark Kohr and was filmed in Toronto on August 5, 1999. It begins with lead singer Raine Maida sitting in a chair in what appears to be a hotel hallway. Using special effects, he stands up and walks away, but a second "copy" of him remains seated. The video is then split into two sets of scenes: In one set, the band is set up in the middle of a lobby and performs the song; in the other scenes, Maida walks through a city. During the choruses of the song, Maida is suddenly pulled through the air (apparently acting as gravity was pulling him), causing him to crash into several walls, and smash through a tree, a wall, and several windows. He tries holding onto a fire hydrant and a street sign, but is pulled away. At the end of the video, Raine sits down on a bench on a pier, but he is pulled away out over the water after trying to hold on to the bench. In 2000, the video won another two MuchMusic Video Awards (both are People's Choice), Favourite Canadian Group and Favourite Canadian Video.

== Track listings ==
UK 7-inch single

1. "One Man Army" – 3:22
2. "Superman's Dead" (live in New York)

UK CD single

1. "One Man Army"
2. "Starseed"
3. "Clumsy"
4. "One Man Army" (video)

== Charts ==
=== Weekly charts ===
Chart (1999–2000)	Peak position
Canada Rock/Alternative (RPM)	1
UK Singles (Official Charts)	70
UK Rock & Metal (Official Charts)	2
US Alternative Airplay (Billboard)	13
US Mainstream Rock (Billboard)	16

=== Year-end charts ===
Chart (1999)	Position
Canada Rock/Alternative (RPM)	3
US Mainstream Rock Tracks (Billboard)	79
US Modern Rock Tracks (Billboard)	64

== Release history ==
Region	Date	Format(s)	Label(s)	Ref.
Canada	July 30, 1999	Radio	Columbia	
United States	August 17, 1999	Mainstream rock; active rock radio	Columbia	
United Kingdom	January 3, 2000	CD	Epic	
