= Nice Place to Visit =

Studio album by Frōzen Ghōst
- Released: 1988
- Studio: Arnyard, Toronto
- Genre: Rock
- Length: 44:43
- Label: WEA Canada; Atlantic (USA)
- Producer: Arnold Lanni

Frōzen Ghōst chronology
Frōzen Ghōst (1987)	Nice Place to Visit (1988)	Shake Your Spirit (1992)

Nice Place to Visit is the second album by the Canadian band Frōzen Ghōst, released in 1988. It had sold more than 50,000 copies before the end of the year.

The album was recorded in a studio set up by the band in a Toronto warehouse. Arnold Lanni used the album to experiment with electronic instrumentation and sampling.

== Critical reception ==
Professional ratings
Review scores
Source	Rating
AllMusic	3/5 stars
Kerrang!	3/5 stars

The Globe and Mail wrote that "the band sounds as if it has been mastered by the AOR sound as much as it has mastered it." The Vancouver Sun called the album "prog-rock pop, with dumb lyrics." The Ottawa Citizen deemed it "a sleepy wash of overdubs channeled into soft-sell protest music." The Kingston Whig-Standard concluded that, "in going for a commercial sound, sometimes you end up sacrificing the soul of your music, and that seems to be what's happened here."

== Track listing ==
All songs written by Arnold Lanni.

1. "Better to Try" - 4:42
2. "Pauper in Paradise" - 4:45
3. "Selling Salvation" - 4:57
4. "Step by Step" - 3:50
5. "Mother Nature" - 3:48
6. "Echo a Miracle" - 4:30
7. "Round and Round" - 4:22
8. "Dream Come True" - 4:19
9. "Perfect World" - 4:25
10. "Suspended Humanation" - 5:05

== Album credits ==
Personnel

- Arnold Lanni – lead vocals, acoustic and electric guitars, keyboards, programming
- Wolf Hassel – bass and vocals

with:

- Phil X – additional guitar
- John Gargano – additional guitar
- Phil Poppa, Tony Carlucci, Mike Massaro, Doug Gibson, Serge Molella, Tony Moretta – additional background vocals

Production

- Arnold Lanni – producer
- Michael Sarracini – engineer
- Mixed at the Farmyard Studios, Bucks, England, by Stephen W. Tayler
- Mastering – George Marino at Sterling Sound, NYC
