= Happiness... Is Not a Fish That You Can Catch =

Studio album by Our Lady Peace
- Released: September 21, 1999
- Recorded: January–June 1999
- Studio: Arnyard (Toronto)
- Genre: Alternative rock; art rock; post-grunge
- Length: 43:23
- Label: Columbia
- Producer: Arnold Lanni

Our Lady Peace chronology
Clumsy (1997)	Happiness... Is Not a Fish That You Can Catch (1999)	Spiritual Machines (2000)

Singles from Happiness...Is Not a Fish That You Can Catch
- 1. "One Man Army" Released: July 30, 1999; 2. "Is Anybody Home?" Released: January 10, 2000; 3. "Thief" Released: March 21, 2000

Happiness... Is Not a Fish That You Can Catch (written as simply Happiness... on the cover) is the third studio album by Canadian alternative rock band Our Lady Peace. It was released on September 21, 1999, by Columbia Records. The album was very successful in Canada, debuting at #1 on the Canadian Albums Chart. The album was certified 3× Platinum in July 2001. Hit singles from the album include "One Man Army", "Is Anybody Home?", and "Thief". The final track on the CD, "Stealing Babies", features Elvin Jones, a prominent post-bop jazz drummer. The photo shoot for this album took place around Staten Island in New York State.

== Background ==
In early 1998, while touring behind their sophomore album Clumsy, the members of Our Lady Peace were already eager to get back into the studio. "We're all starting to get that itch," bass player Duncan Coutts said in a March 1998 interview. "We're all writing collectively and individually. Everyone's hovered over their four-track machines, if we're not trying to work things out in sound checks."

Mike Turner and Raine Maida said in interviews at the time that they wanted to make an album that didn't sound derivative, an accusation that had stung them in the past. Smashing Pumpkins leader Billy Corgan infamously accused them of ripping off his band's sound. They would try to counter the criticisms with their next album. "We've toured so much for the last five years throughout the U.S. and Canada and with all the bands we've played with . . . music became so diluted and so disposable we said: 'If we're going to make a record, let's put out something that maybe challenges people.'"

According to Raine Maida, the overall idea of the album is human obsession, "A lot of this record came from obsessions: Definitely seeing those obsessions in the States, the guns, the Gap ads and how the media determines who you are these days.... During the recording of this record, we talked a lot about death, for whatever reason. There's definitely an obsession with death and a huge fear. But in knowing that, it makes you hate these other things more, because it's not what life's about. Buying Tommy Hilfinger (sic) because it's cool has nothing to do with any kind of emotional value or content, and music for me does. So when they hit each other, I get pretty emotional about it."

== Recording ==
For their third studio album, Our Lady Peace chose again to work with producer Arnold Lanni in Toronto. The band began writing, jamming and recording demos for Happiness... in late November soon after their appearance at the 1998 Summersault festival. Raine brought in many of the songs he had written in demo form already recorded and the rest of the band expanded upon those. Unlike the previous two albums, Mike Turner took little part in the writing process. Recording began in mid-January 1999. The band isolated themselves in the studio with little outside contact. They spent one and a half months recording the bed tracks of vocals and guitar and a week and a half each for drum and bass parts. The album took four months to record in all. For the first time, this album was recorded entirely on digital equipment using ProTools to edit. "It's the best thing for us because you don't have to wait between takes like if I'm doing a vocal take or Jeremy's doing drum stuff, if you want to do it again, you can do it instantaneously." Other new effects the band used included filtering percussion through a distortion box and recording guitar parts through antique microphones, including one used by Stevie Wonder.

Former drummer for John Coltrane, Elvin Jones makes a guest appearance on the final track of the album "Stealing Babies". Jeremy Taggart was a big fan of Jones' and was able to meet him through his drum technician while at a show in Seattle. He invited Jones' into the Toronto studio early into the recording sessions to record drums for the song, which were recorded in one take.

Halfway through recording, the band realized that the music they were recording would be very hard to recreate live, especially for Mike Turner. They decided to hire Boston area multi-instrumentalist Jamie Edwards, who had formerly played with Blue Man Group and that Jeremy knew through a mutual friend, to augment their live shows. "The turning point was when we decided to take off the table our usual constraint, which is that if we can't pull it off as a three-piece instrumental then we shouldn't be doing it," said Mike Turner. "Now we're like, we'll get another guy, we'll do whatever we have to, let's just make a great record. So we indulged ourselves with a lot of textures, a lot of other sounds." Jamie provided extra guitar as well as Keyboards and other special effects and ended up recording for the album. The band was looking to make a sonic leap forward from their previous albums. "We took the things we thought were original from 'Clumsy' and 'Naveed' and tried to overdo them." said Raine Maida, "As well, our songwriting really improved."

Raine Maida has stated that the album is so tight and so well executed because the band only recorded 12 songs during the Happiness sessions, instead of recording 20 or more like they did with their previous two albums. They strove to achieve a much simpler method of songwriting than on the previous albums which included tightening up songs and forming more cohesive tracks. This allowed each song to have the utmost attention given to it while being written and it sometimes took one week or more to record one song. "Annie" for example, took over two weeks of jam sessions to become a fully realized song.

This was the first album of theirs to not be mixed by their producer Arnold Lanni. It was instead sent to Kevin Shirley at Avatar Studios in New York City. The mixing of the album was completed by late June 1999 when they played many of the songs for the first time for a large audience at Woodstock 1999.

== Release and reception ==
Professional ratings
Review scores
Source	Rating
AllMusic	3/5 stars
Entertainment Weekly	C+
Richmond Times-Dispatch	B−
San Antonio Express-News	2.5/5 stars
Sputnikmusic	5/5 stars

To promote the upcoming release of their album in September, Our Lady Peace performed a live in-studio concert and Q&A which was aired to 12 Canadian radio stations simultaneously utilizing satellite and ISDN technology. Listeners to any of the stations could call in and ask the band members questions. On September 13, 1999, a special listening party was held on a newly redesigned ourladypeace.com where fans could listen to the entire album via streamlink. The band also held an online chat with fans for a Q & A session.

Happiness... was released in Canada on September 21, 1999. The album was very successful in its first week, selling 40,090 copies and debuting at #1 on the Canadian Albums Chart.

Upon its release, Happiness... was panned by many critics who cited it as being over-ambitious and too dour in subject manner. In the band's hometown, Ben Rayner, the reviewer of The Toronto Star said, "...there's something curiously unmoving and dispassionate about it - it's canned angst ordered from some overstocked and increasingly disused alt-rock warehouse outside of Seattle, too studious and sterile to ever really hit you the way rock 'n' roll is supposed to." Leigh Buckley Fountain of the Richmond Times-Dispatch gave the album a B− and positively noted that, "The same catchy melodies, same distracted off-kilter rhythms dominate this album that dominated 1998's Clumsy. but went on to criticize Maida's vocal performance as being "too experimental". He also had to say about the lyrical content, "One problem with the album is its typically vague, tangential lyrics. Critics have called Maida a "philosopher," but I'm not so sure I'd go all that far. I like what he does, but snippets out of the blue like "Nazis breast feeding" don't do much for me."

David Gerard of the Boston Globe praised the guitar playing from the album, especially on the song "Blister" and also noted how the band had expanded its musical turf. Melissa Maino of The Buffalo News also reviewed the album positively, citing "Thief" as a stand-out track and saying that, "Our Lady Peace's music may be a little predictable, but if it's not broke, don't fix it." In a 2.5 star review, the San Antonio Express-News praised the album for its high energy and subtle textures but criticized the vocals, saying "Raine Maida's overexposed falsetto is grating enough to send borderline psychotics over the edge."

== Music and lyrics ==
The songs on Happiness... focus on a lighter melody, often following vocalist Raine Maida's extreme range of octaves sung in a falsetto-like manner. He could travel from one octave to another with ease and very smoothly. This created a very surreal effect to the songs, best shown on songs like "Happiness & the Fish", "Blister" and "Lying Awake", much like "Big Dumb Rocket" from Clumsy. The overall sound was quite a departure from their first album, Naveed, featuring very toned-down guitars and the addition of synthesizers and other instruments, typical in most alternative rock albums.

Raine explained the album's overall concept in an early 2000 interview with Vue Weekly:

There was definitely a lot of talk around the studio about death and mortality and spirituality and trying to figure out what happens after this. That’s the one question we can’t answer, and it’s interesting. It’s obvious that it’s something that haunts me on a personal level, as I try to fall asleep in some hotel room alone somewhere. I’d rather try to figure it out now than do the typical ‘Turn 65 and try to find God because I’m afraid of dying’ business. I don’t think life should be like that. There has to be some attention to detail and substance throughout your life. The whole Happiness... thing stems from that. It’s about trying to find something in a superficial world that isn’t superficial.

The lyrics on the album are mostly written in the first-person. The lyrics are usually about unusual themes—laziness, isolation, loneliness and happiness, most explained in a metaphorical manner. The track "Lying Awake" was said to be about Benny Hinn, and how Raine Maida viewed him as a con-artist, trying to scam people into religion. "Annie" is said to be about a girl who is made an outcast, and ends up killing everybody in the end, similar to Pearl Jam's song "Jeremy" on their debut album Ten.

=== Stealing Babies ===
In an online chat in March 2001, Mike Turner revealed the inspiration for this song. "The song was inspired by a PBS documentary about a little girl named Eve that was diagnosed with AIDS when she was 6 years old. She went around the world and visited other kids with AIDS. Raine was so inspired. The song features John Coltrane’s drummer, Elvin Jones, who played on the album A Love Supreme.

== Tour ==
Before their show at Woodstock in June, Our Lady Peace played a set of secret gigs in Muskoka and Toronto under the pseudonym Belly Flop Communist, at Jamie Edwards' suggestion. T-shirts were even made up and sold at the shows. While the shows were secret, the band divulged their true identity over the radio causing the shows to soon sell out. Here, the band played many of the songs from Happiness for the very first time live. They played at Woodstock on July 25, 1999, where they played a 12 song set including six songs from the new album.

Soon after the release of Happiness... in September 1999 the band set off on a tour across the United States opening with Oleander for Creed. They did a short tour in Europe opening for The Stereophonics in December as well as in February 2000 back in Canada. The cross-America tour continued into January 2000 before the band began their cross-Canadian headline tour dubbed "The World's a Blister Tour". They returned to the United States in the Spring to participate in multiple music festivals such as Pointfest in St. Louis, Missouri, and SpringFest in Pensacola, Florida.

During August 2000, the members of OLP organized the second Summersault tour, where them and other Canadian and American bands including The Smashing Pumpkins and Foo Fighters toured together across Canada. Touring effectively ended after Summersault as the band had announced work for a brand new studio album, Spiritual Machines which they had been working on since before the festival and which would be completed and released in Canada before the end of the year.

== Track listing ==
All tracks are written by Raine Maida, Arnold Lanni, Jeremy Taggart, Mike Turner, Duncan Coutts.

No.	Title	Notes	Length
1.	"One Man Army"		3:22
2.	"Happiness & The Fish"		3:34
3.	"Potato Girl"		4:27
4.	"Blister"		3:57
5.	"Is Anybody Home?"		3:37
6.	"Waited"		3:32
7.	"Thief"		4:01
8.	"Lying Awake"		4:02
9.	"Annie"		4:02
10.	"Consequence of Laughing"		3:16
11.	"Stealing Babies"	featuring Elvin Jones	5:30
Total length:			43:23

=== Japan Bonus tracks ===
No.	Title	Notes	Length
12.	"The Needle and the Damage Done"	1994 Neil Young cover	3:44
13.	"Clumsy"		4:29

== Personnel ==
=== Our Lady Peace ===
- Raine Maida - vocals; acoustic guitar, piano
- Mike Turner - electric guitar
- Duncan Coutts - bass guitar
- Jeremy Taggart - drums, percussion

=== Other personnel ===
- Jamie Edwards - keyboards, electric guitar
- Elvin Jones - drums on "Stealing Babies"

== Year-end charts ==
Chart (2000)	Position
Canadian Albums (Nielsen SoundScan)	56

Chart (2002)	Position
Canadian Alternative Albums (Nielsen SoundScan)	171

== Studio Outtakes ==
1. "Trapeze" - song taken from Clumsy sessions; live version available on internet
2. "Ordinary/Ordinary Day" - Abandoned track from recording sessions for Happiness. The PPU Christmas 1998 video included clips of the band rehearsing this song; never released
3. "Sleeping In" - Abandoned track from recording sessions for Clumsy. The lyrics were published in the PPU Christmas 1998 newsletter; never released. A poor quality recording is available on YouTube.

== Release history ==
Region	Date	Label	Format	Catalog
Canada	September 21, 1999	Columbia	CD/CS	CK/T 63707
United States	September 28, 1999	Columbia	CD/CS	CK/T 63707
United States	September 28, 1999	Columbia	2CD	CK 63899
United Kingdom	November 15, 1999	Epic	CD	EPC 496098 2
Europe	March 8, 2000	Epic	CD	EPC 496098 2
Japan	March 8, 2000	Epic	CD	ESCA 8108
Canada	February 14, 2020	Columbia	LP	88985445601
