= Annie (song) =

Song by Our Lady Peace

from the album Happiness... Is Not a Fish That You Can Catch
- Released: 21 September 1999
- Recorded: 1999
- Genre: Alternative rock, post-grunge
- Length: 4:03
- Label: Sony BMG Music Entertainment
- Songwriter(s): Raine Maida and Jeremy Taggart,
- Producer(s): Arnold Lanni

"Annie" is a song by Canadian rock band Our Lady Peace from the album Happiness... Is Not a Fish That You Can Catch.

== Plot ==
The song revolves around a character, Annie, who seems to be unpopular, weird, and perhaps insane. Raine Maida has stated that this song is about a girl contemplating murdering students at her school, similar to the 1999 Columbine High School Massacre, which occurred three weeks after this song was written.

== Writing ==
"I don't talk about my lyrics much (to the band)," Maida says, "But the day I heard the news, I said: 'Guys, the song Annie is written exactly about this.' I felt the need to tell them because I didn't want them to think that morning I had been reading the paper, writing lyrics."

== Origin ==
While many of the songs on Happiness... were developed from ideas brought into the studio that remained unchanged throughout recording, "Annie" developed mainly from jam sessions over a long period of time. "It [Annie] took a long time," said Maida, "We had the verse for the longest time and it took weeks in the rehearsal hall just playing it as a band and finally the chorus happened. And it's all out, now it's a song. Jeremy started the beat to 'Annie' with Duncan doing the bass groove and you know what? right away you know this is something to work on."
