= Frozen Ghost (album) =

Studio album by Frozen Ghost
- Released: 1987
- Studios: Arnyard Studios, Toronto
- Genre: Rock
- Labels: WEA Canada; Atlantic (USA)
- Producer: Arnold Lanni

Frozen Ghost chronology
Frozen Ghost (1987)	Nice Place to Visit (1988)

Professional ratings
Review scores
Source	Rating
Allmusic	3.5/5 stars

Frozen Ghost is the debut album of the band Frozen Ghost, released in 1987. Its first single, "Should I See" (a song about censorship) reached #69 on the Billboard Hot 100.

The run-out groove of side two on the LP contains unintelligible speech. When played backwards, a voice (presumably Arnold Lanni's) says, "You are ruining your needle!"

The cover picture was taken in Scarborough, Ontario (a suburb of Toronto) at the foot of the Scarborough Bluffs.

== Track listing ==
All songs written by Arnold Lanni.

1. "Should I See" - 3:48
2. "Promises" - 3:50
3. "Beware the Masque" - 4:00
4. "Yum Bai Ya" - 3:55
5. "Love Like a Fire" - 4:07
6. "End of the Line" - 3:32
7. "Time is the Answer" - 4:01
8. "Love Without Lies" - 4:11
9. "Soldiers Cry" - 3:36
10. "Truth in Lies" - 4:20

== Singles ==
The following singles were released from the album, with the highest charting positions listed.

#	Title	Release date	CAN	Hot 100
1.	"Should I See"	April 1987	27	69
2.	"Promises"	1987		-

- The b-side of the "Should I See" single was the song "Suspended Humanation". It would later appear on their second album Nice Place to Visit.

== Album credits ==
=== Personnel ===
- Arnold Lanni - lead vocals, guitars, keyboards, programming
- Wolf Hassel - bass, background vocals .Johnnie Gargano- Lead Guitar

with:

- Derry Grehan - additional guitar
- Tony Moretta - additional guitar
- Lenny Mizzoni - saxophone, background vocals
- Manu Silvani - female vocal on "Promises"
- The Chianti Square singers - Gabe Piersanti, Lenny Mizzoni, Bryan Gagnon, Wolf Hassel, Eric Lawrence, Reeb, Sam

=== Production ===
- Arnold Lanni - producer
- Joe Primeau - engineer
- Mixed at the Farmyard Studios, Bucks, England by Stephen W. Tayler
- Mastering - George Marino at Sterling Sound, NYC
