= Never Say Never (Alias album) =

Studio album by Alias
- Released: March 3, 2009
- Recorded: 1992 at the House of Music, West Orange, New Jersey, Platinum Sound, Mississauga, Ontario, Soundcastle and Studio 56, Los Angeles, California
- Genre: Hard rock
- Length: 75:25
- Label: EMI Canada, Angelmilk
- Producer: Freddy Curci, Steve DeMarchi, John Jansen, Rick Neigher, & Randy Nicklaus

Alias chronology
Alias (1990)	Never Say Never (2009)

Professional ratings
Review scores
Source	Rating
Rockeyez	4/5 stars

Never Say Never, released in 2009, is the second album from the 1990s hard rock band Alias.

In early January 2009, Alias announced the release of their long-awaited second album. This album, appropriately titled Never Say Never, sat unreleased for nearly 18 years. It was recorded in 1992 and was planned to follow the self-titled debut album Alias. However, due to the rapidly evolving music scene of that time where the grunge movement was growing in popularity and metal was fading, it was not released. A few of the songs from this album were re-recorded and appeared on lead vocalist Freddy Curci's solo album Dreamer's Road, but many tracks remained unreleased.

House of Lords vocalist James Christian recorded 3 of the Never Say Never songs, "Pleasure and Pain", "The Warden", and "Woman Enough", for his 1994 debut solo album, Rude Awakening, although "Woman Enough" only appears as a bonus track on the Japanese edition and the expanded 1999 Frontiers re-issue.

== Track listing ==
1. "Woman Enough" (Curci, DeMarchi, Baker, Dei Cicchi) (4:31)
2. "XTCOI" (Curci, DeMarchi, Baker, Dei Cicchi) (3:42)
3. "How Much Longer Is Forever" (Curci, DeMarchi, Ribler) (4:10)
4. "Give Me a Reason to Stay" (Diamond, Lorber) (4:36)
5. "Wild Wild One" (Curci, DeMarchi, Meissner) (4:47)
6. "Pleasure and Pain" (Baker, Dei Cicchi) (4:47)
7. "The Warden" (Curci, DeMarchi, Baker, Dei Cicchi) (5:12)
8. "Bare Necessity" (Curci, DeMarchi, Schwartz) (4:04)
9. "All I Want Is You" (Harms) (5:03)
10. "Call of the Wild" (Curci, DeMarchi, Burgess) (5:36)
11. "Diamonds" (Curci, DeMarchi, Stewart, DeMarchi) (4:13)
12. "Play Me a Song" (Curci, DeMarchi) (2:00)
13. "We Want It All" (Curci, DeMarchi, Baker, Dei Cicchi) (5:23)

Bonus tracks:

1. "Perfect World" (Krikorian, Burtnick) (4:33)
2. "Into the Fire" (Curci, DeMarchi) (4:37)
3. "Who Do You Think You Are" (Curci, DeMarchi) (4:07)
4. "When I'm with You" (Lanni) (live acoustic version) (3:46)

== Musicians ==
- Freddy Curci - Lead vocals, background vocals, additional keyboards (tracks 3 & 13)
- Steve DeMarchi - Guitar, background vocals, bass guitar (track 16)
- Denny DeMarchi - Keyboards, background vocals
- Marco Mendoza – Bass
- Larry Aberman - Drums
- Robert O'Hearn - Keyboards

=== Additional musicians ===
- Eric Troyer - background vocals
- James Christian - background vocals
- Rick Neigher - background vocals
- Ross Stewart - additional guitar (track 11)
- Mike Baird - drums (track 15)
- CJ Vanston - additional keyboards (track 16)
