= Thief (Our Lady Peace song) =

Single by Our Lady Peace

from the album Happiness... Is Not a Fish That You Can Catch
- Released: March 21, 2000
- Recorded: 1999
- Genre: Alternative rock, post-grunge
- Length: 4:01
- Label: Columbia(CDNK 1493)
- Songwriters: Raine Maida and Jeremy Taggart,
- Producer: Arnold Lanni

Our Lady Peace singles chronology
"Is Anybody Home?" (1999)	"Thief" (2000)	"In Repair" (2000)

Music video
- "Thief" on YouTube

"Thief" is a song by Canadian alternative rock group Our Lady Peace. It was released in March 2000 as the third and final single from their third album Happiness... Is Not a Fish That You Can Catch.

== Content ==
Vocalist Raine Maida has stated that the song was written about a young girl from Kitchener, Ontario that he knew named Mina Kim who had an incurable brain tumor. The "thief" mentioned in the song refers to the tumor. The short clip at the end of the song consisting of a young girl singing a Sunday school song is a real audio clip of Mina Kim singing "Little By Little" with Maida's wife Chantal Kreviazuk and drummer Jeremy Taggart.

== Music video ==
Micha Dahan directed the music video. It was filmed on a rooftop in the St. James Town neighbourhood, downtown Toronto. It premiered on Muchmusic on May 23. It was shot entirely under a rainy setting on an otherwise sunny day, to impose the mood given by the song. Band members do not play instruments and are shown in slow motion film stock in the rain. The video starts off with the band name and song title and then a statement reading “Each year, terminal illness steals the lives of thousands of children. Mina Kim was one”.

== Chart performance ==
Chart (2000)	Peak position
Canada Alternative Top 30 (RPM)	5
