= Freddy Curci =

Canadian rock singer

- Genre: Rock
- Occupations: Singer, songwriter
- Years active: 1970s–present
- Labels: EMI, Frontiers

Federico "Freddy" Curci is a Canadian singer and songwriter. He was lead vocalist for the rock band Sheriff, and is the founder, frontman, and lead singer for the band Alias.

Curci provided lead vocals on the Sheriff song "When I'm with You", which reached the number one spot in 1989, and the Alias power ballad "More Than Words Can Say", which reached the number two spot in 1990 on the Billboard charts.

BMI presented Curci with the Million-airs award for "More Than Words Can Say". According to BMI's website, only 1,500 songs have achieved Million-air status (one million air plays) among the 4.5 million songs by 300,000 BMI represented artists. One million performances is the equivalent of approximately 50,000 broadcast hours, or more than 5.7 years of continuous airplay.

In January 2009, Alias announced the release of their long delayed second album, Never Say Never, which was recorded in 1992 but not released due to the rapidly evolving music scene of that time where grunge was the new rage and metal was out. A few of the songs from this "lost" album were re-recorded and appeared on Curci's solo album Dreamer's Road, but the rest remained unreleased.

== Early influences ==
Curci is of Italian descent. At an early age, Curci listened mostly to classical opera music. He started listening to Black Sabbath and other rock music in his teenage years. Aside from opera music, some of Curci's musical influences were Lou Gramm of Foreigner and Tom Johnston of The Doobie Brothers.

Before Sheriff, Curci performed in Italian wedding bands in Toronto.

== Songwriting career ==
As a Billboard top 10 hit songwriter, Curci and his Sheriff and Alias bandmate Steve DeMarchi co-wrote the number 2 hit song "More Than Words Can Say", and the Hot Mainstream Rock Tracks number 18 hit song "Haunted Heart". He also co-wrote most of the songs on the Alias album, his solo album Dreamer's Road, and the Zion album.

Curci is also a songwriter for the motion picture industry. In 2007, Curci's songs were featured in several episodes of Lifetime's "Army Wives". Curci was the primary composer for the sitcom Two Guys and a Girl (2000–2001), and also wrote the title theme.

In addition to DeMarchi, Curci has collaborated with Brett Walker, Jeff Paris, Romina Arena, Jason Hook, his wife, Lara Cody, F. Grossi, Donny Hackett, and Douglas Vallance.

== Discography ==
With Sheriff

- Sheriff (1982), Capitol
- Sheriff Live (1983), Capitol (Promo Only)

With Alias

- Alias (1990), EMI
- Haunted Heart (1990, EP), EMI
- Waiting for Love (1991, EP), EMI
- Perfect World (1992, EP), EMI
- Never Say Never (2009), EMI

Solo albums

- Dreamer's Road (1994), EMI
- Then & Now (2000), EMI, Frontiers (Italy)

Solo singles

- Brown Eyed Girl (1994), #31 CAN
- Dreamer's Road (1994), #26 CAN
- Give Me A Reason To Stay (1995), #57 CAN

Compilation inclusions

- The Boys of Summer (1994), EMI

With Zion

- Zion (2006), Frontiers

With Who's Your Daddy!

- Who's Your Daddy! (2010), WYD Records
- Paternity Suit (2012), WYD Records
- Anti-Social Security (2015), WYD Records

Singles with Alias

Year	Song	US Hot 100	US MSR	US A.C.	UK Singles	Album
1990	"More Than Words Can Say"	2	-	2	-	Alias
1990	"Haunted Heart"	-	18	-	-	Alias
1991	"Waiting for Love"	13	-	17	87	Alias
1991	"Perfect World"	90	-	-	-	Don't Tell Mom the Babysitter's Dead Soundtrack

== Filmography ==
- 1991 Don't Tell Mom the Babysitter's Dead Soundtrack: Performer / Producer "Perfect World"
- 1999 Two Guys and a Girl and a Pizza Place : Au Revoir Pizza Place (#3.2) Primary Composer
- 1999 Two Guys and a Girl and a Pizza Place (#3.4) Primary Composer
- 2006 Metal Mania: Stripped Across America Live
- 2007 Army Wives: After Birth (#1.2) TV Episode [Soundtrack] Songwriter / Performer: "Whatcha Tryin' To Do" and "Echoes in the Darkness"
- 2007 Army Wives: Independence Day (#1.5) TV Episode [Soundtrack] Songwriter / Performer: "Home"
- 2007 Army Wives: Only The Lonely (#1.8) TV Episode [Soundtrack] Songwriter / Performer "Crazy Day" and "Carrie"

== Footnotes ==
=== References ===
- Freddy Curci interview, Strutter Magazine
- "Billboard". Billboard Hot 100 airplay and sales charts. Retrieved 2006-06-11
- Feldman, Christopher (2000). The Billboard Book of Number Two Hits. ISBN 0-8230-7695-4
- BMI Website
- Sheriff Album review, written by Robert Lunte, author of Four Pillars of Singing, Amazon.com
- A Freddy Curci Telephone Interview, www.melodicrock.com
