= Frozen Ghost =

Canadian rock band (1985–1993)

Frōzen Ghōst
- Frōzen Ghōst in 1992

Background information
- Origin: Toronto, Ontario, Canada
- Genre: AOR
- Years active: 1985–1993
- Labels: WEA Canada; Atlantic (USA)
- Past members: Arnold Lanni; Wolf Hassel; Marshall B Beer; John Bouvette; Phil X; Sammy D. Bartel; Johnnie Gargano

Frozen Ghost, stylized as Frōzen Ghōst, was a Canadian rock band formed in 1985 in Toronto by Arnold Lanni and Wolf Hassel, who were previously with the band Sheriff. The band received a Juno Award for "Most Promising Group of the Year" in 1987.

The group placed five songs in the Canadian top 40 between 1987 and 1992, including "Should I See" and "Head Over Heels". "Should I See", an anti-censorship song, also became a minor hit in the United States, reaching number 69 on Billboard's Hot 100 singles in 1987. The video for that song was nominated at the 1987 Juno Awards for "Best Video of the Year".

== History ==
=== Career ===
The group formed after Sheriff disbanded following a moderately successful run, during which they had reached the top 10 on the Canadian music charts with "When I'm With You". Sheriff rhythm guitarist/keyboardist Arnold Lanni and bassist Wolf Hassel decided to form a new group.

On their first two albums, Frōzen Ghōst and Nice Place to Visit, the band was a studio duo, with Lanni singing lead vocals and playing all the guitar keyboard parts, in addition to being credited as the sole songwriter, while Hassel played bass and sang backing vocals. These first two albums featured guest musicians, such as Derry Grehan, lead guitarist of Honeymoon Suite. On their final album Shake Your Spirit, there were three official additions to the band: John Bouvette, who was on drums and percussion, Marshall Beer on keyboards and Phil X who played the guitar and did some vocals. Phil X was also credited on the album Nice Place to Visit for being a guitarist, but was not considered an official band member until the final album was released.

=== Post break up ===
Frōzen Ghōst disbanded in 1993, following their final album Shake Your Spirit. During the time Frozen Ghost was an active band, Sheriff's 1983 hit "When I'm With You" (written by Lanni) was re-issued, and in 1989 the track became a #1 hit in the US. Though there were offers to reunite Sheriff, Lanni and Hassel declined. Other members of Sheriff instead went on to form the group Alias, which experienced chart success in the 1990s.

Arnold Lanni would go on to become a successful producer for acts such as Our Lady Peace, Finger Eleven and Thousand Foot Krutch. Hassel would resurface in 1996 with the band Erin Cody and the Drum and later appeared on a 2003 album by Toronto-based blues musician Brian Gladstone.

Hassel rejoined his former Sheriff bandmates, Freddy Curci and Steve DeMarchi on 30 December 2011, for an onstage performance by Curci and DeMarchi's post-Sheriff band, Alias, which led to his joining Alias as a permanent member in 2014.

In 2005, Warner Music Canada released the remastered compilation CD Frozen Ghost - The Essentials.

== Discography ==
=== Albums ===
- Frōzen Ghōst - 1987
- Nice Place to Visit - 1988
- Shake Your Spirit - 1991
- The Essentials - 2005 (compilation album)

=== Singles ===
Year	Song	CAN	US	US Rock	Album
1987	"Should I See"	27	69	4	Frozen Ghost
1987	"Promises"	-	-	-	Frozen Ghost
1988	"Yum Bai Ya"	92	-	-	Frozen Ghost
1988	"Round and Round"	19	-	44	Nice Place to Visit
1988	"Pauper in Paradise"	24	-	-	Nice Place to Visit
1989	"Dream Come True"	34	-	-	Nice Place to Visit
1992	"Head Over Heels"	16	-	-	Shake Your Spirit
1992	"Cry (If You Want To)"	36	-	-	Shake Your Spirit
1992	"Shine on Me"	69	-	-	Shake Your Spirit

== See also ==
- Canadian rock
- Metal umlaut
