= Shake Your Spirit =

Studio album by Frōzen Ghōst
- Released: 1992
- Studio: Arnyard, Toronto
- Genre: Rock
- Label: WEA Canada; Atlantic (USA)
- Producer: Arnold Lanni

Frōzen Ghōst chronology
Nice Place to Visit (1988)	Shake Your Spirit (1992)	The Essentials (2005)

Shake Your Spirit is the third album by the Canadian band Frōzen Ghōst, released in 1992. It was recorded in early 1991. It was the band's final album.

The album cover is a photograph of a birdcage that belonged to Geddy Lee.

== Production ==
The album was produced by frontman Arnold Lanni. The rhythm tracks were recorded live, often in one take.

== Critical reception ==
Professional ratings
Review scores
Source	Rating
AllMusic	2/5 stars
Calgary Herald	D
Chicago Tribune	1.5/4 stars

The Calgary Herald noted the "vocal stylings that combined the best of Boston and worst of Foreigner." The Toronto Star determined that "there's hooks a-plenty, but the riffs all have a vague 'I've heard this before' feel about them." The Gazette deemed the album "stereotypical of a true Canadian top 40s rock band." The Ottawa Citizen wrote that it "has the reeling onslaught of a revival meeting with its funky beat, soul-shouters on backup vocals and fire-and-brimstone lyrics."

The Globe and Mail opined: "Calculated and commercial it may be, but Shake Your Spirit is a deft package of hard-hitting songs that compares favourably with some of the best AOR packages released in the past decade."

== Track listing ==
All songs written by Arnold Lanni.

1. "Come Alive (Intro)" - 0:25
2. "Shake Your Spirit" - 4:11
3. "So Strange" - 3:55
4. "Cry (If You Want To)" - 4:09
5. "Shine on Me" - 4:09
6. "Another Time and Place" - 4:40
7. "Something to Say" - 4:50
8. "Revival (Intro)" - 0:30
9. "Stuck in a Groove" - 4:28
10. "Head over Heels" - 4:33
11. "Swing to the Rhythm" - 4:06
12. "Doing That Thing" - 4:47
13. "The Whistling Custodian" - 0:34
14. "Gotta Get a Day Job" - 1:48

== Personnel ==
Arnold Lanni – lead vocals, keyboards, guitars
John Bouvette – drums, percussion
Phil X – guitars, vocals
Wolf Hassel – bass, vocals
