= Is Anybody Home? =

2000 single by Our Lady Peace

Single by Our Lady Peace

from the album Happiness... Is Not a Fish That You Can Catch
- Released: January 11, 2000
- Length: 3:38
- Label: Columbia
- Songwriters: Raine Maida; Arnold Lanni
- Producer: Arnold Lanni

Our Lady Peace singles chronology
"One Man Army" (1999)	"Is Anybody Home?" (2000)	"Thief" (2000)

Music video
- "Is Anybody Home?" on YouTube

"Is Anybody Home?" is a song by Canadian alternative rock band Our Lady Peace. It was released in January 2000 as the second single from their third album, Happiness...Is Not a Fish That You Can Catch.

== Content ==
In an interview with Billboard, Raine Maida stated that 'Is Anybody Home' is about trying to console that person desperate for human attention." Maida explained, "It deals a lot with isolation in a kind of twisted way. Feeling isolated in your home but being barraged by media, television, and the Internet. It is conceivable now that you can just stay home and surf the Internet. It leaves us with a lot of nonhuman contact."

== Music video ==
The music video premiered on MTV on March 6, 2000. Scenes of the band playing were filmed in the basement of the Eastminster United Church on Danforth Ave. east of Broadview Ave. in the Riverdale neighborhood of Toronto. It was directed by Giuseppe Capotondi. It stars Katherine Moennig of The L Word fame. It opens with the beginning of the song playing on the radio that wakes her up. Throughout the video, it cuts to the band playing in a crowded room. Walking around her house, she realizes nobody else is home but the tea kettle is whistling. She gets in her car and drives into a city, but the streets are empty and filled with abandoned vehicles. It shows scenes of her eating food in an empty cafe and sleeping on a couch in a furniture store. At the end of the video, she notices a man running around the corner of a building, supposedly it's Raine. She goes to follow him and the video ends as she looks around the corner.

== Charts ==
=== Weekly charts ===
Chart (2000)	Peak position
Canada Rock/Alternative (RPM)	2
US Alternative Airplay (Billboard)	20
US Mainstream Rock (Billboard)	27

=== Year-end charts ===
Chart (2000)	Position
US Modern Rock Tracks (Billboard)	67
