= More Than Words Can Say =

1990 single by Alias

Single by Alias

from the album Alias
- Released: August 1990
- Genre: Hair metal
- Length: 3:54
- Label: EMI
- Songwriters: Freddy Curci, Steve DeMarchi
- Producer: Rick Neigher

Alias singles chronology
"Haunted Heart" (1990)	"More Than Words Can Say" (1990)	"Waiting for Love" (1991)

"More Than Words Can Say" (also known as "(I Need You Now) More Than Words Can Say" for promotional purposes) is a song by Canadian rock band Alias. It was released in 1990 as the second single from their debut eponymous album. The power ballad became a No. 2 hit in the United States and reached No. 1 in Canada for four weeks.

BMI presented Alias lead vocalist and songwriter Freddy Curci with the "Million-airs award" for "More Than Words Can Say". According to BMI's web site, only 1,500 songs have achieved Million-air status (one million air plays) among the 4.5 million songs by 300,000 BMI represented artists. One million performances is the equivalent of approximately 50,000 broadcast hours, or more than 5.7 years of continuous airplay.

== Composition and inspiration ==
"More Than Words Can Say" was written, arranged, and co-produced by former Sheriff vocalist Freddy Curci and guitarist Steve DeMarchi. DeMarchi's younger brother Denny played the keyboard and sang the backing vocals. Curci recorded the vocals in Denny DeMarchi's bedroom at DeMarchi's family home.

At the time, their dissolved band had hit number one with "When I'm with You" the previous year, and the other band members had refused to reunite. Sensing the need to follow up the hit, Curci and DeMarchi joined ex-Heart members guitarist Roger Fisher, bassist Steve Fossen, and drummer Mike Derosier to form Alias. This tune, bearing striking similarities to "When I'm with You" (including a sustained last note), was the result.

== Chart performance ==
"More Than Words Can Say" was released as the second single of Alias' self-titled debut album. It entered the Billboard Hot 100 at No. 84 and reached the top 40 four weeks later. On November 24, 1990, it peaked at No. 2. It also peaked at No. 2 on the Adult Contemporary chart. In the band's native Canada, the song reached No. 1 on November 24 and stayed there for four weeks, ending 1990 as the country's second-highest-selling single. It also topped Canada's Adult Contemporary chart for a week. Outside North America, "More Than Words Can Say" only managed to chart in Australia and New Zealand, peaking at No. 30 and No. 37 respectively.

== Charts ==
=== Weekly charts ===
Chart (1990–1991)	Peak position
Australia (ARIA)	30
Canada Top Singles (RPM)	1
Canada Adult Contemporary (RPM)	1
New Zealand (Recorded Music NZ)	37
US Billboard Hot 100	2
US Adult Contemporary (Billboard)	2
US Cash Box Top 100	2

=== Year-end charts ===
Chart (1990)	Position
Canada Top Singles (RPM)	2
Canada Adult Contemporary (RPM)	68

Chart (1991)	Position
Canada Adult Contemporary (RPM)	74
US Adult Contemporary (Billboard)	28

== Release history ==
Region	Date	Format(s)	Label(s)	Ref.
United States	August 1990	Cassette	EMI	
United Kingdom	November 12, 1990	7-inch vinyl; 12-inch vinyl; CD; cassette	Capitol	
Australia	November 26, 1990	Cassette	EMI	
Australia	April 29, 1991	7-inch vinyl	EMI	
