= Alias (band) =

Canadian rock band

- Origin: Toronto, Ontario, Canada
- Genres: Hard rock, AOR
- Years active: 1988–present
- Labels: EMI, Angelmilk, Capitol
- Members: Freddy Curci; Steve DeMarchi; Roscoe Stewart; Wolf Hassel; Chris Sutherland
- Past members: Denny DeMarchi; Roger Fisher; Steve Fossen; Mike Derosier; Marco Mendoza; Larry Aberman; Robert O'Hearn
- Website: Official Myspace

Alias was a Canadian rock supergroup, formed in 1988 in Toronto by songwriter/lead vocalist Freddy Curci and songwriter/lead guitarist Steve DeMarchi of the Canadian arena rock band Sheriff, along with Heart founding members Roger Fisher, Steve Fossen, and Mike Derosier.

== History ==
=== Alias 1988–1992 ===
Curci and DeMarchi were members of the Canadian rock band Sheriff from 1979 to 1985. Sheriff's popularity in the club circuit garnered the attention of Capitol Records, which led to their self-titled album Sheriff. Sheriff's singles, particularly "When I'm with You", received a large amount of airplay and reached No. 1 in Canada. Although promotion and distribution problems stalled the record's initial American momentum, the song reached No. 61 on the Billboard charts. Reports of fans not being able to buy the record in stores plagued Sheriff's American tour. Rigorous touring, frustration and disappointments caused tensions that split the band; Sheriff disbanded in 1985.

With the financial backing of friends and family, and with the help of DeMarchi's brother Denny (who later played keyboard and sang backing vocals on the Alias album), Curci and DeMarchi built a recording studio in the DeMarchi family home basement. They worked as couriers during the day, while writing and recording at night. Most of these songs would end up on Alias' self-titled debut album.

In 1988, their song "When I'm With You" re-entered and climbed the US Billboard chart for a second time. In January 1989, Capitol Records re-released the Sheriff album in the US. "When I'm With You" hit No. 1 on the Billboard chart in February 1989. Curci and DeMarchi tried to get Sheriff back together, but the other members of Sheriff, rhythm guitarist/keyboardist Arnold Lanni and bassist Wolf Hassel (who had formed the band Frozen Ghost in 1985), were not interested. Curci and DeMarchi joined forces with ex-Heart members Roger Fisher, Steve Fossen and Mike Derosier, to form Alias.

The band released their debut album, Alias, in 1990; it went gold in the US and platinum in Canada, scoring hits with the power ballads "More Than Words Can Say" (No. 1 Canada, No. 2 U.S.), "Waiting for Love" (No. 13) and "Haunted Heart" (No. 18 on Mainstream Rock Charts). "More Than Words Can Say" was the band's biggest hit, climbing to No. 2 on the Billboard Hot AC chart and on the Billboard Hot 100. A North American tour followed through 1990 (including a stint as the opening act for REO Speedwagon) but, while touring, the trio of former Heart musicians left the band due to musical differences.

In an interview with Strutter magazine, Curci said that Alias never formally disbanded: "Alias never split. Music changed. We couldn't get our music out there. No one wanted to hear it anymore. Grunge was in and, you know what, that's OK, 'cause music needs to do that. It needs to change all the time. That's how it stays fresh. Alias is still Steve and I. Alias will always be Steve and I. Steve and I will do a record tomorrow if the fans need one!"

The band performed twice on The Tonight Show, with Jay Leno on January 8, 1991, and with Johnny Carson on March 8, 1991. They also recorded the Tonio K song "Perfect World" for the 1991 Christina Applegate film, Don't Tell Mom the Babysitter's Dead.

BMI presented Freddy Curci and Steve DeMarchi with the "Million-Air Award" for "More Than Words Can Say". According to BMI's website, only 1,500 songs, including "When I'm With You", achieved Million-air status (one million air plays) among the 4.5 million songs by 300,000 BMI-represented artists. One million performances is the equivalent of approximately 50,000 broadcast hours, or more than 5.7 years of continuous airplay.

=== Never Say Never 2005–2010 ===
In 1992, Alias recorded their second album, but grunge was on the rise and metal was fading. EMI Canada sat on the record and encouraged Curci to record a solo album, Dreamer’s Road, which was released in 1994.

DeMarchi became a support and touring player for The Cranberries, then recorded and toured in support of Are You Listening?, the 2007 solo album by The Cranberries lead singer Dolores O'Riordan. While on tour, he found that people were asking him to autograph copies of the second Alias album, which had not been released. Some of the songs from that album had appeared on Dreamer's Road and been illegally recorded and printed. As a result, in January 2009, EMI announced the release of Alias' second album, Never Say Never.

In early 2005, an acoustic version of "More Than Words Can Say" was released on a VH1 compilation disc, Classic Metal Mania: Stripped. That same year, "More Than Words Can Say" was featured in a Subway commercial aired during the Super Bowl.

Alias played New York's CMJ Music Marathon in 2005, and the 2006 Dour Festival in Belgium.

In 2010, Alias headlined, with an acoustic set, at the opening party of Chicago's Melodic Rock Fest 2. On 21 August 2014, Alias played at The Sturgis Canada Motorcycle Rally and Music Festival in Merritt, British Columbia, which was the first full live show for the band in many years. The reunion band members included Curci, Hassel, Steve DeMarchi, Denny DeMarchi, guitarist Roscoe Stewart, and drummer Chris Sutherland.

In 2013, Fossen, Fisher and Derosier were inducted into the Rock and Roll Hall of Fame as members of Heart. Fisher has continued to record, most recently with The Human Tribe. On May 15, 2020, Denny DeMarchi died of cancer, at age 57. Marco Mendoza and Michael Marquart continue to record; Mendoza as late as 2018, Marquart as recently as 2021.

== Members ==
- Freddy Curci – lead vocals, keyboards, piano, guitars (1988–1991, 2009–present)
- Steve DeMarchi – guitar, backing vocals (1988–1991, 2009–present)
- Roscoe Stewart – guitars (2014–present)
- Wolf Hassel – bass (guest in 2011, 2014–present)
- Chris Sutherland – drums (2014–present)
- Roger Fisher – guitar, backing vocals (1988–1991)
- Steve Fossen – bass, backing vocals (1988–1991)
- Mike Derosier – drums (1988–1991)
- Michael Marquart – drums (1990)
- Denny DeMarchi (1962-2020) – keyboards (1990–1991 touring), 2009–2020; also performed session keyboards and backing vocals on Alias' debut album)
- Marco Mendoza – bass (2009–2014)
- Larry Aberman – drums (2009–2014)
- Robert O'Hearn – keyboards (2009–2014)

== Discography ==
Studio albums

Title	Details	Peak chart positions		
Title	Details	AUS	DEN	US
Alias	Release date: 18 June 1990; Label: Capitol/EMI Canada; Formats: CD, LP, cassette	121	31	114
Never Say Never	Release date: 3 March 2009; Label: EMI Canada, Angelmilk Records; Formats: CD, music download	—	—	—
"—" denotes releases that did not chart

Singles

Year	Single	Peak chart positions								Album
Year	Single	AUS	CAN	CAN AC	NZ	UK	US	US AC	US Main	Album
1990	"Haunted Heart"	—	35	—	—	—	—	—	18	Alias
1990	"More Than Words Can Say"	30	1	1	37	—	2	2	—	Alias
1991	"Waiting for Love"	135	4	—	—	87	13	17	—	Alias
1991	"The Power"	—	32	—	—	—	—	—	—	Alias
1991	"Perfect World"	—	51	33	—	—	90	—	—	Don't Tell Mom the Babysitter's Dead (soundtrack)
"—" denotes releases that did not chart

Album appearances

Year	Song	Album
1991	"Into the Fire"	Nintendo: White Knuckle Scorin'

== See also ==
- List of glam metal bands and artists

== Bibliography ==
- Feldman, Christopher (2000). The Billboard Book of Number Two Hits. ISBN 0-8230-7695-4.
