= Sheriff (band) =

Canadian rock band (1979–1985)

- Origin: Toronto, Ontario, Canada
- Genres: Pop rock, arena rock
- Years active: 1979–1985
- Labels: EMI/Capitol Canada (Canada, 1982-1983)
- Past members: Freddy Curci; Steve DeMarchi; Arnold Lanni; Wolf Hassel; Rob Elliott

Sheriff was a Canadian rock band in the early and mid 1980s, best known for their 1982 song "When I'm with You" which became a Billboard No. 1 hit upon re-release in early 1989.

== Biography ==
The band was formed in 1979 in Toronto, Ontario, Canada, and consisted of vocalist Freddy Curci, guitarist Steve DeMarchi, keyboardist/rhythm guitarist Arnold Lanni, bassist Wolf Hassel, and drummer Ric Dowhan, later replaced by Rob Elliott. The band's only full-length release was a self-titled 1982 album, that featured a Canadian Top 40 hit, "You Remind Me" as well as their most famous song, "When I'm with You", which reached No. 8 in Canada and No. 61 in the United States in 1983. Five years later it was re-released and hit No. 1 on the Billboard Hot 100 chart in the U.S. The band split up in 1985, citing internal tensions. Lanni and Hassel went on to form Frozen Ghost and racked up several hits in Canada, the biggest of which was "Should I See," which reached No. 69 in the U.S.

Six years after "When I'm with You" had been a chart hit in Canada, Las Vegas DJ Jay Taylor began playing the song. KRXY DJ Gabe Baptiste also started playing "When I'm With You," and listener response was positive. As a result, Capitol Records re-released the song. It subsequently became No. 1 in the United States in February 1989. While Curci and DeMarchi made efforts to re-form Sheriff, a reunion was not to be. The lack of interest from other Sheriff band members eventually led Curci and DeMarchi to team up with several former members of Heart to form Alias, who in the early 1990s had two popular singles, with "Waiting for Love" and their No. 2 success, "More Than Words Can Say."

Meanwhile, Lanni, and Hassel continued to work with Frozen Ghost until they split up in 1993.

== Later years ==
Curci and DeMarchi resurrected the Alias name in 2009 with new members, and they released their second album (which had been shelved 17 years prior). They continue to tour with Alias.

Lanni has become a producer, having worked with Our Lady Peace, Finger Eleven, and Simple Plan, among others.

At an Alias concert on December 30, 2011, at Cosmo Music in Ontario, original Sheriff bassist Wolf Hassel joined Curci and DeMarchi on stage for the first time in 26 years for a full set, which included a performance of "When I'm with You." This performance led to Hassel joining Alias on a permanent basis in 2014.

== Discography ==
=== Studio albums ===
- Sheriff (1982)
- Sheriff Live (Promo Only) (1983)

=== Singles ===
Year	Single	Peak chart positions		Album
Year	Single	CAN	US	Album
1982	"You Remind Me"	28	—	Sheriff
1983	"When I'm with You"	8	61	Sheriff
1988	"When I'm with You" (re-release)	29	1	Single only
"—" denotes releases that did not chart.
