= Alias (album) =

Studio album by Alias
- Released: June 18, 1990
- Recorded: 1989–1990
- Studios: Capitol Studio B & C (Hollywood); Summa Music Group (Los Angeles); The Enterprise (Los Angeles); Platinum Sound (Toronto)
- Genres: AOR, hard rock
- Length: 48:42
- Label: Capitol (EMI Canada)
- Producers: Freddy Curci; Steve DeMarchi; Rick Neigher

Alias chronology
Alias (1990)	Never Say Never (2009)

Singles from Alias
- 1. "More Than Words Can Say" Released: September 8, 1990; 2. "Waiting for Love" Released: 1991

Professional ratings
Review scores
Source	Rating
AllMusic	3/5 stars

Alias is the debut album from the Canadian rock band Alias, released in 1990 by Capitol Records.

The single "More Than Words Can Say" reached No. 1 in Canada and No. 2 in the United States. A third single, "Waiting for Love", was released in early 1991 and peaked at No. 13 on the U.S. Billboard Hot 100.

== Track listing ==
1. "Say What I Wanna Say" (F. Curci, S. DeMarchi) - 4:45
2. "Haunted Heart" (F. Curci, S. DeMarchi, S. Diamond) - 3:52
3. "Waiting for Love" (B. Walker, J. Paris) - 4:38
4. "The Power" (F. Curci, S. DeMarchi) - 4:26
5. "Heroes" (F. Curci, S. DeMarchi) - 5:22
6. "What to Do" (F. Curci, S. DeMarchi) - 4:18
7. "After All the Love Is Gone" (F. Curci, S. DeMarchi, R. Neigher, J. Paris) - 4:17
8. "More Than Words Can Say" (F. Curci, S. DeMarchi) - 3:54
9. "One More Chance" (R. Neigher, Fee Waybill, J. Dexter) - 3:37
10. "True Emotion" (F. Curci, S. DeMarchi) - 4:59
11. "Standing in the Darkness" (F. Curci, S. DeMarchi, D. DeMarchi) - 4:34

== Personnel ==
Alias

- Freddy Curci – lead vocals
- Steve DeMarchi – guitars
- Roger Fisher – guitars
- Steve Fossen – bass
- Mike Derosier – drums

Additional musicians

- Denny DeMarchi – keyboards, backing vocals

== Production ==
- Jody Mitchell – A&R direction
- Randy Nicklaus – A&R direction
- Tim Trombley – A&R direction
- Rick Neigher – producer
- Freddy Curci – arrangements (1), producer (5, 6, 8, 10, 11)
- Steve DeMarchi – arrangements (1), producer (5, 6, 8, 10, 11)
- Denny DeMarchi – additional production (5, 6, 8, 10, 11)
- Dave Runstedler – additional production (5, 6, 8, 10, 11)
- Mark Sullivan – production coordinator (Emerald Productions)
- Deborah Critten – production coordinator (Capitol Canada)
- Sharon Gaudet – production coordinator (Capitol Canada)
- Hugh Syme – art direction, design
- Randall Cooper – sculpture
- John Scarpati – photography
- R. Alfonso – art direction
- Allen Kovac and Jeff Sydney for Left Bank Management – management

Technical credits

- Greg Calbi – mastering at Sterling Sound (New York City, New York)
- George Tutko – engineer (1–4, 6, 7, 9), mixing (1–4, 6, 7, 9)
- Dave Runstedler – engineer (5, 6, 8, 10, 11)
- Eddie De Lena – mixing (5, 6, 8, 10, 11), additional engineer (5, 6, 8, 10, 11)
- Peter Doell – additional engineer (1–4, 6, 7, 9)
- Freddy Curci – additional engineer (5, 6, 8, 10, 11)
- Denny DeMarchi – additional engineer (5, 6, 8, 10, 11)
- Steve DeMarchi – additional engineer (5, 6, 8, 10, 11)
- Kyle Bess – assistant engineer (1–4, 6, 7, 9)
- Fred Kelly, Jr. – mix assistant (5, 6, 8, 10, 11)
- Charlie Paakkari – mix assistant (5, 6, 8, 10, 11)

== Charts ==
Chart (1990)	Peak position
Australian Albums (ARIA)	121
Canada Top Albums/CDs (RPM)	32
US Billboard 200	114

== Certifications ==
Region	Certification	Certified units/sales
Canada (Music Canada)	Platinum	100,000^{^}
^{^} Shipments figures based on certification alone.
