= Jeff Paris (musician) =

American vocalist, keyboardist and guitarist

Jeff Paris (born Geoffrey Brillhart Leib) is an American vocalist, keyboardist and guitarist who has primarily performed in the hard rock/heavy metal genre.

Still performing under the name Geoffrey Leib, Paris began his career as a session musician in the 1970s, appearing on albums by such acts as Jay Gruska (Gruska on Gruska) and Bill Withers (Naked & Warm, 'Bout Love). His initial band was the jazz/soul/disco quartet, Pieces, who released an album in 1979, following which he had a stint with the disco band L.A.X., who released two albums in 1979 and 1980. Meanwhile, he continued writing songs and performing on sessions for other high-profile artists such as Jeffrey Osborne (self-titled debut, Stay with Me Tonight, and Don't Stop) and Leon Ware (self-titled album), the latter a famed Motown songwriter in his own right, throughout the early/mid-1980s.

Beginning in 1984, Paris/Leib branched off in a more hard rock direction as a songwriter and musician, contributing to albums that year by Lita Ford and Y&T. His credits included "Gotta Let Go" (Ford) and "Lipstick & Leather" (Y&T). He went on to work as session musician on Cinderella's 1986 debut album, playing keyboards. Around the same time, he signed with PolyGram, releasing two solo albums Race to Paradise in 1986, and Wired Up in 1987, but both failed to make commercial impact. In the 1990s, Paris released three more solo albums: Lucky This Time (1993), Smack (1997) and Freak Flag (1998) and also continued working as a session musician and songwriter.

In this session player/songwriter role, Paris worked with different bands and artists such as, in addition to the abovementioned Lita Ford and Y&T, the female rock band Vixen, Michael Sembello, XYZ, Stevie Salas, Mr. Big, and many others, primarily as keyboardist and backing vocalist. As a songwriter, he co-wrote many hits around late 1980s and early 1990s such as the song "Waiting for Love," which became a successful single for the band Alias in the early 1990s. Also, the songs "One Night Alone", "Charmed Life" and "Cryin" from Vixen's self-titled debut album were all covers of Paris songs, that had originally appeared on his Wired Up album (a fourth Paris composition, "Give It Away," which he had first featured on Race to Paradise, was also included as a bonus track on the same Vixen album). "Cryin'" became one of the Vixen album's two big hits (following up their first hit single, "Edge of a Broken Heart"). He also penned the song "Let It Out" for Y&T's Ten album and "Road To Ruin," recorded by Mr. Big, who also recorded his song "CDFF-Lucky This Time" for their album Lean Into It; two years later, Paris re-recorded the latter song for his 1993 album.

== Discography ==
=== Studio albums ===
- Race to Paradise (1986)
- Wired Up (1987)
- Lucky This Time (1993)
- Smack (1997)
- Freak Flag (1998)
- Broken Chain (2011)

=== Singles ===
- "My Girl" (1986)
- "Back on My Knees" (1986)
- "Mystery Girl" (1986)
- "Saturday Nite" (1987)
- "I Can't Let Go" (1987)
- "Life of My Broken Heart" (1997)
