= Fame Games Radio =

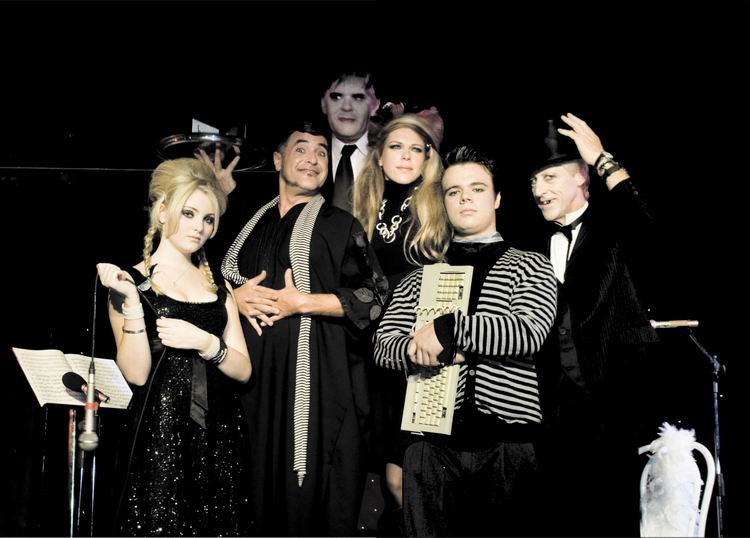
- The Fame Games Crew. Spooky! (From left: Lexy Badger-Ward, Sid Olivera, Paul Sedkowski, Laura Krier, Jake Waby, Graham Keeling)
- Genre: Music and Talk show
- Running time: Weekdays 2x5 mins Saturdays 1 hour Sunday 2 hours
- Country of origin: United States; Spain; United Kingdom
- Home station: Syndicated
- Syndicates: Envision Radio Networks; DialGlobal Radio Networks
- Hosted by: Laura Krier; Paul Sedkowski; Graham Keeling; Sid Olivera; Lexy Badger-Ward; Jake Waby; Tony Cowell
- Created by: Paul Sedkowski and Laura Krier
- Written by: Laura Krier
- Produced by: Paul Sedkowski
- Original release: 2004 – present
- Opening theme: The Fame Games Theme
- Website: www.famegamesradio.com

Fame Games Radio is a music discovery radio program produced by Meer Music International (MMI) for Envision Radio Network in association with Dial Global Radio Network, since February 2010. (The program was previously syndicated through Citadel Media (formerly ABC Radio Networks, through Citadel Broadcasting) since June 2008.)

"Fame Games" is a worldwide competition that has been online since 2006 and on terrestrial radio in Southern Spain since 2004. It is the first music performance competition show on network radio which aims to discover the best new, "unsigned" music from around the world. The show is designed to help promote and break independent artists or "Indies" for short. When unsigned artists submit their songs through MMI's FameGamesRadio website, each song is evaluated through a complex review process before ultimately reaching the broadcast stage. By gaining fan support and positive reviews, a song then advances through several voting stages required to reach the Quarter-Final show (webcast with some terrestrial support). From there the best songs move on to the daily on-air Semi-Final shows and ultimately on the weekend Final shows. Winners are determined by the highest vote totals and review scores based on MMI's proprietary "unanimity formula," with weekly finalists from qualifying events competing for "Track Of The Week", "Track of the Month" and "Track of the Season" honors.

Weekly episodes of "Fame Games" air Monday-Friday through terrestrial as well as online radio affiliates. The program is hosted by the established panel of six judges, which includes singer/songwriter Laura Krier, songwriter/producer Paul Sedkowski and session guitarist Graham Keeling - all independent musicians themselves; as well as Sid Olivera, a former BBC Radio and BFBS Radio personality. The group is rounded out by Jake Waby and Lexy Badger-Ward, two teenage artists-in-training who provide the teen perspective to the group’s discussion and on-air reviews.

"The Global Breakthru Chart" was created in 2009 as a Top-40 format program for independent music, but the show is currently suspended.

The Fame Games weekend Final also includes an exclusive weekly pop music analysis feature called "The Cowell Factor", hosted by author, journalist, head of CowellMedia and brother of Simon Cowell, Tony Cowell.

Concept History

1992-2000: MMI was specialized in artist development and production. Founded by Paul Sedkowski (songwriter/producer, Barcelona Olympics promos, Prince Scandal, Kimera), John Coletta (manager Deep Purple, Whitesnake), Derek Lawrence (producer Hot Chocolate, Deep Purple, Wishbone Ash), Rob Davis (songwriter Mud, Fragma, Spillers Groovejet, Kylie Minogue, N'Sync, Julio Iglesias), Andy Tumi (songwriter Fishbowl, Sugababes, Supafly), Peter van der Meer (businessman).

2001: MMI's first independent-music-based TV formats (never aired) were formulated and circulated in the industry. Re-constituted by Paul Sedkowski, Mary Jane Trokel (TV director/producer The Tonight Show, Solid Gold, Entertainment Tonight), Laura Krier (singer/songwriter)

2004: MMI launches "Fame Games" as a music discovery show, on the Onda Cero radio network in Spain, focused only on local talent as well as own productions.

2006: Fame Games is launched on the web and international independent artists are invited to air on the show.

end-2006: Over 500,000 visits to the MMI site from artists and webcast listeners confirms that the concept is highly appealing.

2007: The annual "Effigy Awards" show is launched to highlight the best artists on the show to date.

2008: Fame Games is syndicated by ABC Radio Networks and begins airing across the USA on selected affiliates. Re-constituted by Paul Sedkowski, Laura Krier, Ignacio Infante (lawyer) and Valerie Bonehill.

2009: "The Global Breakthru Chart" show is launched. "The Cowell Factor" with Tony Cowell is also launched. By the end of 2009, the Fame Games website has seen over 5,000,000 visits and the show is airing on nearly 100 webcasts, podcasts and terrestrial affiliates around the world. Augmented by Don Wasley (marketing expert Kiss, Cher, Skechers, LA Gear).

2010: Fame Games drops the ABC/Citadel syndication and signs with Envision Radio Networks in association with Triton/DialGlobal Radio Networks.
