= Steve DeMarchi =

Canadian musician

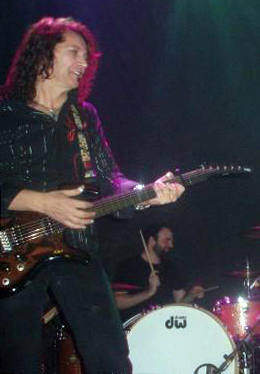
- DeMarchi performing in 2007

Background information
- Born: Toronto, Ontario, Canada
- Genres: Rock; Hard rock Soft rock Arena rock Alternative rock
- Occupations: Guitarist, Songwriter
- Instruments: Guitar, Backing Vocals
- Years active: 1979–present
- Labels: EMI, Sanctuary
- Website: Steve DeMarchi Myspace profile

Steven DeMarchi is a Canadian guitarist, backing vocalist and songwriter. He is best known as the co-founder and lead guitarist of the bands Sheriff (1979–1985) and Alias (1988–1991). DeMarchi also played guitar for The Cranberries (1996–2003) and was the main guitarist for Dolores O'Riordan (2005–2008).

As a Billboard hit songwriter, DeMarchi is known for co-writing the hit songs "More Than Words Can Say", a 1990 Number 1 hit on the BillBoard Hot AC chart and Number 2 on the Billboard Hot 100 and "Haunted Heart", a 1990 Number 18 hit on the US Mainstream Rock chart.

BMI presented DeMarchi with the "Million-air award" for the song "More Than Words Can Say". According to BMI's web site, only 1,500 songs including "When I'm with You" by Sheriff have achieved Million-air status (one million air plays) among the 4.5 million songs by 300,000 BMI represented artists. One million performances is equal to approximately 50,000 broadcast hours, or more than 5.7 years of continuous airplay.

In 1982, DeMarchi performed live with Sheriff in Los Angeles on a nationwide television show An Evening at the Improv. In 1990, he performed live with Alias on several national television shows, including two performances on The Tonight Show - once with Johnny Carson and once with Jay Leno.

DeMarchi was the guitarist for the band The Cranberries between 1996 and 2003. Between 2005 and 2007, Dolores O'Riordan, the voice of The Cranberries and DeMarchi recorded O'Riordan's first solo record titled "Are You Listening". DeMarchi appeared with O'Riordan on many televised and radio live performances in 2007 in support of that record, and travelled to over 22 countries in Europe, North America, and South America on the 2007 O'Riordan world tour.

In May 2007, DeMarchi along with other band members, were featured with O’Riordan in live performances on the Carson Daly Show, The Tonight Show with Jay Leno, True Music on HDnet cable network television, and on Heaven and Earth BBC Manchester.

In January 2009, Alias (primarily DeMarchi and Curci) announced the release of their second album, appropriately titled Never Say Never. Live performances are expected during 2009 in support of this new album release.

== Songwriting career ==
DeMarchi has collaborated with other successful songwriters like Steve Diamond, Jim Vallance, Freddy Curci, Arnold Lanni, Rick Neigher, Albert Hammond, and Jeff Paris, just to name a few.

On the 1982 Sheriff album Sheriff, DeMarchi co-wrote with Arnold Lanni the songs:

- Track 5-Kept Me Coming
- Track 7-Crazy Without You

DeMarchi wrote most of the songs on the 1990 Alias album Alias with Freddy Curci, (the lead vocalist of Sheriff and Alias):

- Track 1-Say What I Wanna Say
- Track 2-Haunted Heart
- Track 4-The Power
- Track 5-Heroes
- Track 6-What To Do
- Track 7-After All The Love Is Gone
- Track 8-More Than Words Can Say
- Track 10-True Emotion
- Track 11-Standing In The Darkness

On Curci's 1994 solo album Dreamer's Road, DeMarchi collaborated in writing the songs:

- Track 2-Dreamer's Road
- Track 4-Just To Be Close
- Track 8-Real Love
- Track 9-Into the Fire
- Track 10-Diamonds
- Track 11-Life Goes On

On the 2006 Zion album, DeMarchi collaborated with Curci for the songs:

- Track 2-How Much Longer Is Forever
- Track 4-Dangerous
- Track 7-No Surprise
- Track 10-Who Do You Think You Are
- Track 11-Crash The Mirror

== Discography ==
=== Sheriff ===
- 1982 Sheriff (self-titled album), Capitol Records

=== Alias ===
- 1990 Alias (self-titled album), EMI
- 1990 Haunted Heart EP, EMI
- 1991 Waiting For Love EP, EMI
- 1992 Perfect World EP, EMI
- 2009 Never Say Never

=== Freddy Curci ===
- 1994 solo album, Dreamer's Road, EMI Music Canada
- 2000 compilation album, Then and Now, Frontiers (Italy)

=== Zion ===
- 2006 Zion, Frontiers Records

=== Dolores O'Riordan ===
- 2007 Are You Listening?
- 2009 No Baggage in the song "Stupid"

=== Singles ===
Year	Song	US Hot 100	US MSR	US A.C.	UK Singles	Album
1990	"More Than Words Can Say"	2	-	5	-	Alias
1990	"Haunted Heart"	-	18	-	-	Alias
1991	"Waiting for Love"	13	-	17	87	Alias
1991	"Perfect World"	90	-	-	-	Don't Tell Mom the Babysitter's Dead Soundtrack

== Filmography ==
1991 - Don't Tell Mom the Babysitter's Dead
Soundtrack: Performer / Producer “Perfect World”
