= Waiting for Love (Alias song) =

Single by Alias

from the album Alias
- Released: 1991
- Recorded: 1990
- Genre: Hard rock
- Length: 4:02 (Single Version) 4:38 (Album Version)
- Label: EMI
- Songwriters: Brett Walker and Jeff Paris
- Producer: Rick Neigher

Alias singles chronology
"More Than Words Can Say" (1990)	"Waiting for Love" (1991)

"Waiting for Love" is a song by Canadian hard rock supergroup Alias, released in 1991 as the third single from their self-titled debut album (1990). Written by Brett Walker and Jeff Paris, the song peaked at number 4 in Canada, and number 13 on the US Billboard Hot 100.

== Charts ==
=== Weekly charts ===
Chart (1991–1992)	Peak position
Canada Top Singles (RPM)	4
UK Singles (Official Charts)	87
US Billboard Hot 100	13
US Adult Contemporary (Billboard)	17
US Cash Box Top 100	10

=== Year-end charts ===
Chart (1991)	Peak position
Canada Top Singles (RPM)	33
