= When I'm with You (Sheriff song) =

1983 single by Sheriff

Single by Sheriff

from the album Sheriff
- B-side: "Crazy Without You" (1983); "Give Me Rock 'N' Roll" (1988)
- Released: January 1983 (Canada); May 14, 1983, November 16, 1988 (U.S.)
- Recorded: 1982
- Genre: Soft rock
- Length: 3:58
- Label: Capitol
- Songwriter: Arnold Lanni
- Producer: Stacy Heydon

Sheriff singles chronology
"You Remind Me" (1983)	"When I'm with You" (1983)	"When I'm with You" (1988)

Alternative cover

"When I'm with You" is a power ballad by Canadian arena rock band Sheriff. The song was released in January 1983 in Canada as the second single from their self-titled debut album. A top-ten hit in Canada in 1983 (and a minor US hit at the same time), the song later reached number one in the United States in 1989, four years after the band separated in 1985, making it a sleeper hit. Guinness World Records lists “When I’m With You” as having the “Longest-held vocal note in a US hit single” which “features a note timed at 19.3 seconds” by “lead singer Federico ‘Freddy’ Curci [who] performed the soaring vocal – starting at 3 minutes 26 seconds – on the recording.” It is also one of the few number-one hits not to have a promotional music video during the MTV era.

== Composition and inspiration ==
Sheriff's keyboardist Arnold Lanni wrote the song after meeting Valeri Brown and falling in love with her. 'I sat down, put my coffee on the piano, tinkled some ivories, and four minutes later 80 percent of the song was written. On Valentine's Day I played the song for Valerie and said, "I don't have anything, this is all I can give you right now. It's yours." Valeri loved the song; two years later she married me.'

Lanni also played the song to his bandmates in Sheriff. "The band really liked it, so we started playing it live. That was one of the last songs we recorded when we did the record. The producer said, 'Is there anything else?' I said, 'There's this song we play, it's kind of a wimpy song.' So we played it for him and he said 'Yeah, that's kind of nice.'"

=== Versions ===
The version featured on the original Canadian release of the Sheriff album differs slightly from the version on later releases that went on to become a hit. In particular, the original version features an entirely different vocal take from Curci, and the drums begin approximately a measure earlier in the song (right as Curci begins singing "lost in love...", as opposed to right after he sings "...is what I feel" on the hit version). While the remaining instrumental backing appears to be the same, the mix is different on the original version, with the guitar or keyboards being more prominent at various points in the song. In addition, it is unclear if Curci holds the final note for the same record-breaking duration as he does on the hit version, since the final vocals are faded out significantly earlier in the original.

== Chart performance ==
"When I'm with You" was originally released as the third single off Sheriff's debut album. The song reached number eight on the RPM chart in the band's native Canada, where it was their biggest hit. In the US, it entered the Billboard Hot 100 on 14 May 1983 and peaked at number 61 four weeks later. Sometime thereafter, disappointed and frustrated by their continued lack of international success, the band broke up.

In November 1988, Brian Philips, Program Director at KDWB in Minneapolis–Saint Paul, and WKTI in Milwaukee began playing the song to hugely positive responses from listeners, and eventually other radio stations across the country followed suit. While the management at Capitol Records complained about having to give attention to a long-forgotten song from a defunct band because "there's no future there", they recognized the song had become very popular in the U.S. and re-released it as a single; the song re-entered the Billboard Hot 100 on 26 November 1988. On 4 February 1989, the song reached number one in the United States, making Sheriff the first Canadian band to do so since Bachman-Turner Overdrive reached number one in November 1974 with "You Ain't Seen Nothing Yet". The song only managed to hit number 112 for two weeks in February 1989 in the UK.

By that time, former Sheriff members Lanni and bassist Wolf Hassell had formed a duo named Frozen Ghost, and declined to re-form the group. Sheriff's lead vocalist Freddy Curci and guitarist Steve DeMarchi, who had both been working as couriers in the interim, subsequently formed the band Alias and charted the following year with the number-two hit "More Than Words Can Say".

== Track listings ==
7-inch single (1983)

A. "When I'm with You" – 3:51
B. "Crazy Without You" – 3:52

Cassette (1988) and 7-inch single (1989)

A. "When I'm with You" – 3:54
B. "Give Me Rock 'N' Roll" – 3:41

== Charts ==
=== Weekly charts ===
Chart (1983)	Peak position
Canada Top Singles (RPM)	8
US Billboard Hot 100	61

Chart (1988–1989)	Peak position
US Billboard Hot 100	1
US Adult Contemporary (Billboard)	1

=== Year-end charts ===
Chart (1983)	Position
Canada Top Singles (RPM)	67

Chart (1989)	Position
US Billboard Hot 100	37
US Adult Contemporary (Billboard)	28

== Certifications ==
Region	Certification	Certified units/sales
Canada (Music Canada)	Gold	50,000^{^}
United States (RIAA)	Gold	500,000^{^}
^{^} Shipments figures based on certification alone.
