= Arnold Lanni =

Canadian musician (born 1956)

- Born: Arnold David Lanni; May 4, 1956 (age 70); Toronto, Ontario, Canada
- Genres: Rock, pop
- Occupations: Musician, record producer
- Instruments: guitar, keyboards, vocals
- Formerly of: Sheriff; Frozen Ghost

Arnold David Lanni (born May 4, 1956) is a Canadian record producer and former member of Frōzen Ghōst and Sheriff. He wrote Sheriff's most successful song, "When I'm with You."

== History ==
Lanni was a founding member of Canadian rock band Sheriff in 1979. The band only released one album (their 1982 self-titled effort, which included "When I'm with You" and another minor hit, "You Remind Me") before breaking up in 1985. Sheriff members Lanni and Wolf Hassel then formed Frozen Ghost, which existed from 1985 to 1993. Lanni was a guitarist, keyboardist, and vocalist for this project.

In 2000, Lanni was nominated as producer of the year at the Juno Awards.

Lanni has produced Canadian rock groups Finger Eleven, Simple Plan, the first four Our Lady Peace albums (including the diamond-certified Clumsy), Hello Operator, Thousand Foot Krutch, Echo Jet, The Waking Eyes, and Rev. He has also produced American groups The Gufs and King's X (Ear Candy).

Preceded by Original	Our Lady Peace producer 1992–2001	Succeeded by Bob Rock
