= Alter Bridge discography =

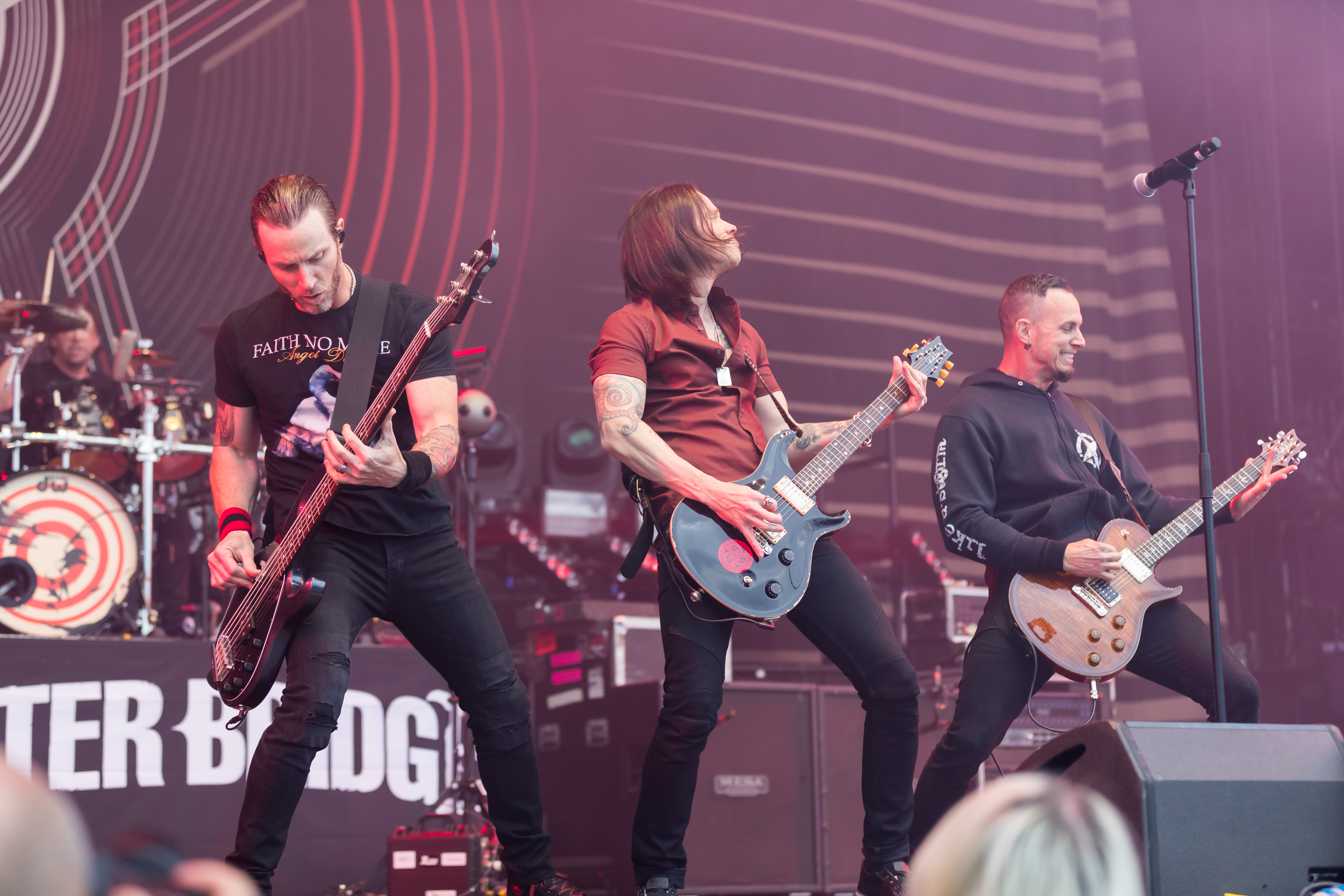
- Alter Bridge in 2017
- Studio albums: 8
- Extended plays: 2
- Live albums: 4
- Singles: 42
- Video albums: 3
- Music videos: 19
- Box sets: 1

The discography of Alter Bridge, an American rock band, includes eight studio albums, four live albums, one box set, two extended plays (EP), 42 singles, three video albums and 19 music videos. Formed in Orlando, Florida, in 2004, Alter Bridge consists of Myles Kennedy and former Creed members Mark Tremonti, Brian Marshall and Scott Phillips. The band released its debut album One Day Remains in 2004, which reached number 5 on the US Billboard 200 and was certified gold by the RIAA. Two of the three singles from the album – "Open Your Eyes" and "Find the Real" – reached the top ten of the Billboard Mainstream Rock chart.

After signing with Universal Republic Records, the group released Blackbird in 2007, which peaked at number 13 on the US Billboard 200. Lead single "Rise Today" reached number 2 on the Mainstream Rock chart, while "Ties That Bind" reached number 2 on the UK Rock & Metal Singles Chart. Alter Bridge's first video Live from Amsterdam reached number 6 on the Billboard Music Video Sales chart in 2009. The band's third album AB III, in 2010, reached number 17 on the Billboard 200 and the top ten of the UK Albums Chart. "Isolation" topped the US Billboard Mainstream Rock chart.

The band released its fourth studio album, Fortress, in 2013, which charted at number 12 on the Billboard 200 and number 6 on the UK Albums Chart. Their fifth studio album The Last Hero followed on Napalm Records in 2016, debuting at number 8 on the Billboard 200 (the band's first top ten on the chart since One Day Remains) and a career peak of number 3 in the UK. Alter Bridge's third and fourth live albums, Live at the O2 Arena + Rarities and Live at the Royal Albert Hall, were released in 2017 and 2018, both of which reached number 2 on the UK Rock & Metal Albums Chart. 2019's Walk the Sky reached number 16 in the US.

== Albums ==
=== Studio albums ===
List of studio albums, with selected chart positions and certifications
Title	Album details	Peak chart positions										Certifications
Title	Album details	US	AUS	AUT	GER	IRL	ITA	NED	SWE	SWI	UK	Certifications
One Day Remains	Released: August 10, 2004; Label: Wind-up; Format: CD	5	37	—	61	—	—	56	—	54	102	RIAA: Gold; BPI: Gold
Blackbird	Released: October 9, 2007; Label: Universal Republic; Formats: CD, CD+DVD	13	—	64	55	—	—	55	56	83	37	BPI: Gold
AB III	Released: November 9, 2010; Label: Alter Bridge, EMI, Capitol; Formats: CD, LP, DL	17	35	15	18	66	83	20	45	15	9	BPI: Silver
Fortress	Released: October 8, 2013; Label: Alter Bridge, Warner Music, Capitol; Formats: CD, LP, DL	12	13	4	7	16	9	10	17	14	6	BPI: Silver
The Last Hero	Released: October 7, 2016; Label: Caroline, Napalm; Formats: CD, LP, DL	8	6	6	5	30	8	10	33	5	3	
Walk the Sky	Released: October 18, 2019; Label: Napalm; Formats: CD, LP, DL	16	7	3	5	68	18	16	59	1	4	
Pawns & Kings	Released: October 14, 2022; Label: Napalm; Formats: CD, LP, DL	35	9	5	7	—	50	15	—	2	6	
Alter Bridge	Released: January 9, 2026; Label: Napalm; Formats: CD, LP, DL	—	50	1	4	—	—	29	—	4	20	
"—" denotes a release that did not chart or was not issued in that region.

=== Live albums ===
List of live albums, with selected chart positions
Title	Album details	Peak chart positions					
Title	Album details	US	AUT	GER	NED	UK	UK Rock
Live from Amsterdam	Released: September 12, 2009; Label: DC3; Format: CD+DVD	—	60	87	—	94	7
Live at Wembley: European Tour 2011	Released: March 26, 2012; Label: DC3; Formats: CD+2DVD, CD+BD	—	—	78	66	31	3
Live at the O2 Arena + Rarities	Released: September 8, 2017; Label: Napalm; Formats: 3CD, 4LP, CD+DVD, DL	162	30	26	—	36	2
Live at the Royal Albert Hall	Released: September 7, 2018; Label: Napalm; Formats: 2CD, 3LP, 2CD+2DVD, DL	—	14	17	—	18	2
"—" denotes a release that did not chart or was not issued in that region.

=== Box sets ===
List of box sets
Title	Album details
Alter Bridge X	Released: August 25, 2014; Label: DC3; Format: 7CD+4LP+13DVD+3BD

== Extended plays ==
List of extended plays
Title	EP details
Fan EP	Released: 2005; Label: Wind-up; Format: CD
Walk the Sky 2.0	Released: November 6, 2020; Label: Napalm; Format: CD, DL

== Singles ==
List of singles, with selected chart positions, showing year released and album name
Title	Year	Peak chart positions										Album
Title	Year	US Main.	US Alt.	US Rock	US Acti.	US Bubb.	US Heri.	US Rock Air.	AUS	UK	UK Rock	Album
"Open Your Eyes"	2004	2	24	×	4	23	2	—	49	—	—	One Day Remains
"Find the Real"	2005	7	—	×	6	—	11	—	—	—	—	One Day Remains
"Broken Wings"	2005	29	—	×	29	—	28	—	—	—	—	One Day Remains
"Rise Today"	2007	3	32	×	3	—	3	—	—	— (Note: "Rise Today" did not enter the UK Singles Chart, but peaked at number 61 on the UK Physical Singles Chart.)	3	Blackbird
"Watch Over You"	2008	19	—	×	18	—	23	—	—	—	—	Blackbird
"Ties That Bind"	2008	—	—	×	—	—	—	—	—	— (Note: "Ties That Bind" did not enter the UK Singles Chart, but peaked at number 34 on the UK Physical Singles Chart.)	3	Blackbird
"Before Tomorrow Comes"	2008	29	—	×	28	—	26	—	—	—	—	Blackbird
"Isolation"	2010	1	20	5	1	—	1	5	—	—	9	AB III
"Ghost of Days Gone By"	2011	4	36	11	5	—	3	11	—	—	—	AB III
"Addicted to Pain"	2013	4	—	—	12	—	14	20	—	150	—	Fortress
"Cry of Achilles"	2014	27	—	—	×	—	×	—	—	—	—	Fortress
"Show Me a Leader"	2016	16	—	—	×	—	×	—	—	—	—	The Last Hero
"My Champion"	2016	18	—	—	×	—	×	—	—	—	—	The Last Hero
"Wouldn't You Rather"	2019	18	—	—	×	—	×	—	—	—	—	Walk the Sky
"Godspeed"	2019	24	—	—	×	—	×	—	—	—	—	Walk the Sky
"Native Son"	2020	32	—	—	×	—	×	—	—	—	—	Walk the Sky
"Silver Tongue"	2022	27	—	—	×	—	×	—	—	—	—	Pawns & Kings
"Holiday"	2023	22	—	—	×	—	×	—	—	—	—	Pawns & Kings
"Silent Divide"	2025	12	—	—	14	—	—	23	—	—	—	Alter Bridge
"—" denotes a release that did not chart or was not issued in that region. "×" denotes periods where charts did not exist or were not archived.

== Promotional singles ==
List of songs, with selected chart positions, showing year released and album name
Title	Year	Peak chart positions	Certifications	Album
Title	Year	UK Rock	Certifications	Album
"Metalingus"	2004	13	BPI: Silver	One Day Remains
"Blackbird"	2007	—		Blackbird
"I Know It Hurts"	2011	—		AB III
"Wonderful Life"	2011	—		AB III
"Life Must Go On"	2011	—		AB III
"Words Darker Than Their Wings"	2011	—		AB III
"Cry a River"	2013	—		Fortress
"Calm the Fire"	2013	—		Fortress
"Waters Rising"	2014	—		Fortress
"Poison in Your Veins"	2016	—		The Last Hero
"The Other Side"	2016	—		The Last Hero
"Cradle to the Grave"	2017	—		The Last Hero
"Pay No Mind"	2019	—		Walk the Sky
"Take the Crown"	2019	—		Walk the Sky
"In the Deep"	2019	—		Walk the Sky
"Dying Light"	2019	—		Walk the Sky
"Last Rites"	2020	—		Walk the Sky 2.0
"Pawns & Kings"	2022	—		Pawns & Kings
"Sin After Sin"	2022	—		Pawns & Kings
"This Is War"	2022	—		Pawns & Kings
"What Lies Within"	2025	—		Alter Bridge
"Playing Aces"	2025	—		Alter Bridge
"Scales Are Falling"	2026	—		Alter Bridge
"Tested and Able"	2026			Alter Bridge

== Videos ==
=== Video albums ===
List of video albums, with selected chart positions
Title	Album details	Peak
Title	Album details	US
Live from Amsterdam	Released: September 12, 2009; Label: DC3; Format: CD+DVD, BD	6
Live at Wembley: European Tour 2011	Released: March 26, 2012; Label: DC3; Formats: CD+2DVD, CD+BD	5
Live at the Royal Albert Hall	Released: September 7, 2018; Label: Napalm; Formats: 2CD+2BD	—
"—" denotes a release that did not chart or was not issued in that region.

=== Music videos ===
List of music videos, showing year released, album and director(s)
Title	Year	Album	Director(s)	Ref.
"Open Your Eyes"	2004	One Day Remains	Dean Karr	
"Broken Wings"	2005	One Day Remains	Dean Karr	
"Rise Today"	2007	Blackbird	Dale Resteghini	
"Ties That Bind"	2007	Blackbird	Michael Alperowitz	
"Watch Over You"	2008	Blackbird	John Cummings	
"Isolation"	2010	AB III	Daniel Catullo	
"Addicted to Pain"	2013	Fortress	Daniel Catullo	
"Lover"	2014	Fortress	Bosco Shane	
"Cry of Achilles"	2014	Fortress	SiLee Films	
"Show Me a Leader"	2016	The Last Hero	Zev Deans	
"Cradle to the Grave"	2017	The Last Hero	unknown	
"Wouldn't You Rather"	2019	Walk the Sky	Dan Sturgess	
"Dying Light"	2019	Walk the Sky	Dan Sturgess	
"Native Son"	2020	Walk the Sky	Stefano Bertelli	
"Silver Tongue"	2022	Pawns & Kings	Ollie Jones	
"Holiday"	2023	Pawns & Kings	Dan Sturgess	
"Silent Divide"	2025	Alter Bridge	J.T. Ibanez	
"What Lies Within"	2025	Alter Bridge	Unknown	
"Playing Aces"	2025	Alter Bridge	J.T. Ibanez	
"Tested and Able"	2026	Alter Bridge	Unknown	
