= Live at the O2 Arena + Rarities =

Live album by Alter Bridge
- Released: September 8, 2017
- Recorded: November 24, 2016 at The O2 Arena, London, England; November 23, 2016 at Manchester Arena, Manchester, England (CD 2 tracks 7, 8 only) various studios during 2004-2016 (Rarities CD only)
- Genre: Hard rock; heavy metal; post-grunge; alternative metal
- Length: 102:47 (concert) + 48:11 (rarities)
- Label: Napalm
- Producer: Alter Bridge; Brian Sperber; Ben Grosse; Michael "Elvis" Baskette

Alter Bridge chronology
The Last Hero (2016)	Live at the O2 Arena + Rarities (2017)	Live at the Royal Albert Hall (2018)

Live at the O2 Arena + Rarities is the third live album by American rock band Alter Bridge. Recorded on November 24, 2016, at The O2 Arena in London, England, during the tour for 2016's The Last Hero, the album also features a disc of tracks initially released as bonus tracks on special editions of previous studio albums, as well as two previously unreleased songs that were recorded in 2004. It was released by Napalm Records on September 8, 2017.

== Background ==
The live portion of Live at the O2 Arena + Rarities was recorded during the promotional tour for Alter Bridge's fifth studio album The Last Hero on November 24, 2016, at The O2 Arena in London, England. The show was described by Blabbermouth.net as "One of the biggest moments of the band's career", and by Chad Childers of Loudwire as "one of their biggest shows in [the band's] history". The live portion is on the album's first and second discs. The Rarities portion includes nine songs that were previously featured as bonus tracks on special editions or regional releases of the band's studio albums, plus two previously unreleased tracks from the One Day Remains sessions: "Cruel Sun" and "Solace". The deluxe edition of the album also features a documentary including interviews with the band members, their crew, and their families, as well as behind-the-scenes footage of the show.

== Track listing ==
Disc one
No.	Title	Length
1.	"The Writing on the Wall"	5:03
2.	"Come to Life"	3:40
3.	"Addicted to Pain"	4:23
4.	"Ghost of Days Gone By"	5:10
5.	"Cry of Achilles"	6:40
6.	"The Other Side"	5:29
7.	"Farther Than the Sun"	4:20
8.	"Ties That Bind"	3:41
9.	"Waters Rising"	5:59
10.	"Crows on a Wire"	4:40
11.	"Watch Over You" (acoustic version)	5:59

Disc two
No.	Title	Length
1.	"Isolation"	4:53
2.	"Blackbird"	8:59
3.	"Metalingus"	5:18
4.	"Open Your Eyes"	6:46
5.	"Show Me a Leader"	5:00
6.	"Rise Today"	6:42
7.	"Poison in Your Veins^{[a]}"	4:57
8.	"My Champion^{[a]}"	4:58

Disc three: Rarities
No.	Title	Length
1.	"Breathe"	4:17
2.	"Cruel Sun"	4:20
3.	"Solace"	4:42
4.	"New Way to Live"	5:41
5.	"The Damage Done"	3:46
6.	"We Don't Care at All"	3:47
7.	"Zero"	4:39
8.	"Home"	3:29
9.	"Never Born to Follow"	4:07
10.	"Never Say Die (Outright)^{[b]}"	3:44
11.	"Symphony of Agony (Last of Our Kind)^{[c]}"	5:34

== Personnel ==
- Myles Kennedy – lead vocals, rhythm and lead guitar
- Mark Tremonti – lead and rhythm guitar, backing and lead vocals
- Brian Marshall – bass
- Scott Phillips – drums

== Charts ==
Chart (2017)	Peak position
Austrian Albums (Ö3 Austria)	30
Belgian Albums (Ultratop Flanders)	141
Belgian Albums (Ultratop Wallonia)	89
German Albums (Offizielle Top 100)	26
Hungarian Albums (MAHASZ)	35
Scottish Albums (OCC)	16
Swiss Albums (Schweizer Hitparade)	48
UK Albums (OCC)	36
US Billboard 200	162

== Notes ==
^{[a]} Bonus tracks "Poison In Your Veins" and "My Champion" were recorded on November 23, 2016, at Manchester Arena.

^{[b]} "Never Say Die" was incorrectly listed as "Outright" on early pressings of Fortress. On Live at the O2 Arena + Rarities it is listed as "Never Say Die (Outright)". It is not a cover of the Black Sabbath piece of the same name.

^{[c]} Similarly, "Symphony of Agony" was incorrectly listed as "Last of Our Kind" on The Last Hero, and is likewise here listed as "Symphony of Agony (Last of Our Kind)".
