= Live at the Royal Albert Hall (featuring The Parallax Orchestra) =

Live album by Alter Bridge and The Parallax Orchestra
- Released: September 7, 2018
- Recorded: October 2 and 3, 2017
- Venue: Royal Albert Hall (London, England)
- Genre: Hard rock; heavy metal; post-grunge; progressive metal; alternative metal; symphonic metal
- Length: 120:35 (2CD); 147:45 (DVD)
- Label: Napalm
- Producer: Tim Tournier; Brian Sperber; Sturge Media

Alter Bridge and The Parallax Orchestra chronology
Live at the O2 Arena + Rarities (2017)	Live at the Royal Albert Hall (featuring The Parallax Orchestra) (2018)	Walk the Sky (2019)

Live at the Royal Albert Hall (featuring The Parallax Orchestra) is the fourth live album by American rock band Alter Bridge. Recorded on October 2 and 3, 2017, at Royal Albert Hall in London, England, the band played two sold-out shows with the 52-piece Parallax Orchestra, conducted by Simon Dobson. For the occasion, the band performed songs that are rarely played, such as "The End Is Here" and "Words Darker Than Their Wings", the latter receiving its live debut.

== Background ==
The original idea of a doing a full concert with an orchestra was the brainchild of Tim Tournier, Alter Bridge's Manager. Tournier offered the idea after the band's promotional O2 Arena gig; the band members saw the idea as a "no-brainer" and began planning. Myles Kennedy explained, "I think out of all the years of doing this [music], this experience is the top two or three highlights without a doubt.". Three songs, Addicted To Pain, Words Darker Than Their Wings and The End Is Here, were released prior to the album.

== Track listing ==
All tracks are written by Alter Bridge.

Disc one
No.	Title	Original album	Length
1.	"Slip to the Void"	AB III	5:18
2.	"Addicted to Pain"	Fortress	4:24
3.	"Before Tomorrow Comes"	Blackbird	4:06
4.	"The Writing on the Wall"	The Last Hero	4:44
5.	"Cry of Achilles"	Fortress	6:56
6.	"In Loving Memory"	One Day Remains	5:30
7.	"Fortress"	Fortress	7:44
8.	"Ties That Bind"	Blackbird	3:53
9.	"The Other Side"	The Last Hero	5:34
10.	"Brand New Start"	Blackbird	4:50
11.	"Ghost of Days Gone By"	AB III	4:28

Disc two
No.	Title	Original album	Length
1.	"The Last Hero"	The Last Hero	6:55
2.	"The End Is Here"	One Day Remains	4:26
3.	"Words Darker Than Their Wings"	AB III	5:23
4.	"Waters Rising"	Fortress	5:51
5.	"Lover"	Fortress	5:19
6.	"Wonderful Life/Watch Over You"	AB III/Blackbird	7:09
7.	"This Side of Fate"	The Last Hero	6:56
8.	"Broken Wings"	One Day Remains	5:15
9.	"Blackbird"	Blackbird	9:16
10.	"Open Your Eyes"	One Day Remains	6:38

DVD/Blu-ray
No.	Title	Length
1.	"Intro"
2.	"Slip to the Void"
3.	"Addicted to Pain"
4.	"Before Tomorrow Comes"
5.	"Show Preparation/Interview"
6.	"The Writing on the Wall"
7.	"Cry of Achilles"
8.	"In Loving Memory"
9.	"Fortress"
10.	"The First Rehearsal/Interview"
11.	"Ties That Bind"
12.	"The Other Side"
13.	"Rehearsal Reactions"
14.	"Brand New Start"
15.	"Ghost of Days Gone By"
16.	"Future Song Foundation/Interview"
17.	"The Last Hero"
18.	"The End Is Here"
19.	"Rehearsal - WDTTW/Interview"
20.	"Words Darker Than Their Wings"
21.	"Waters Rising"
22.	"Lover"
23.	"Family/Interview"
24.	"Wonderful Life/Watch Over You"
25.	"This Side of Fate"
26.	"Fans/Interview"
27.	"Broken Wings"
28.	"Blackbird"
29.	"Open Your Eyes"
30.	"End Titles/Credits"

== Personnel ==
- Personnel adapted from the album liner notes

Alter Bridge

- Myles Kennedy – vocals, guitar
- Mark Tremonti – guitar, vocals
- Brian Marshall – bass
- Scott Phillips – drums

The Parallax Orchestra

- Simon Dobson – Conductor, Music Director & Orchestral arrangements (Except where noted)
- Andrew Skeet – Orchestral arrangements (In Loving Memory, Ghost of Days Gone By, The Last Hero, Words Darker Than Their Wings, Blackbird and Open Your Eyes)
- Nathan Klein – Orchestral arrangements (In Loving Memory, Ghost of Days Gone By, The Last Hero, Words Darker Than Their Wings, Blackbird and Open Your Eyes)
- James Toll – Violin 1.1
- Lucy McKay – Violin 1.2
- Glesni Roberts – Violin 1.3
- Daniella Meagher – Violin 1.4
- Elena Abad – Violin 1.5
- Will Newell – Violin 1.6
- Claire Sledd Violin 2.1
- Will Harvey – Violin 2.2 & Orchestral arrangements (The End Is Here, Waters Rising and Lover)
- Aura Fazio – Violin 2.3
- Olivia Holland – Violin 2.4
- Sophie Belinfante – Violin 2.5
- Katherine Sung – Violin 2.6
- Anisa Arslanagic – Viola 1
- Elitsa Bogdanova – Viola 2
- Jenny Ames – Viola 3
- Sophia Rees – Viola 4
- Raisa Zapryanova – Viola 5
- Zami Jalil – Viola 6
- Maddie Cutter – Cello 1
- Bethan Lloyd – Cello 2
- Fraser Bowles – Cello 3
- David Kadumukasa – Cello 4
- Alex Marshall – Cello 5
- Klara Schumann – Cello 6
- Alex Verster – Double bass 1
- Jess Ryan – Double bass 2
- Sam Kinrade – Trumpet
- Sarah Campbell – Trumpet
- Ross Anderson – Trombone & Bass Trombone
- Jane Salmon – Trombone & Bass Trombone
- Tom Kelly – Tuba
- Tom Bettley – French Horn 1
- Sam Pearce – French Horn 2
- Laurie Truluck – French Horn 3
- Beth Higham-Edwards – Percussion 1/Timpani
- Molly Lopresti – Percussion 2/Tuned percussion
- Alex Griffiths – Flute & Piccolo
- Eleanor Tinlin – Oboe
- Dan Hillman – Clarinet & Baritone saxophone
- Tom Moss – Bassoon & Contrabassoon
- Lewis Reid – Double Bass (27th rehearsal only)
- Eloise MacDonald – Violin 1 (27th rehearsal only)

Production

- Dan Sturgess – Director & Editor
- Sturge Media – Film producer
- Tim Tournier – Executive producer
- Ben Gazey – Associate producer
- Brian Sperber – Music producer
- Tim Roe – Recording engineer
- Brad Blackwood – mastering

== Charts ==
Chart (2018)	Peak position
Austrian Albums (Ö3 Austria)	14
Belgian Albums (Ultratop Flanders)	92
German Albums (Offizielle Top 100)	17
Scottish Albums (Official Charts)	10
Swiss Albums (Schweizer Hitparade)	27
UK Albums (Official Charts)	18
UK Album Downloads (Official Charts)	17
UK Independent Albums (Official Charts)	3
UK Rock & Metal Albums (Official Charts)	2
