= Alter Bridge: Live at Wembley =

Alter Bridge: Live at Wembley – European Tour 2011

Live album by Alter Bridge
- Released: March 26, 2012
- Recorded: November 29, 2011
- Venue: Wembley Arena (London, United Kingdom)
- Genre: Post-grunge; hard rock; alternative metal; heavy metal
- Label: EMI, The Dude Films, 3 Dimensions
- Director: Daniel Catullo; Ted Kenney
- Producer: Daniel Catullo; Lionel Pasamonte

Alter Bridge chronology
| AB III (2010) | Live at Wembley (2012) | Fortress (2013) |

Alter Bridge video chronology
| Live from Amsterdam (2009) | Live at Wembley (2012) | Live at the Royal Albert Hall (featuring The Parallax Orchestra) (2018) |

Professional ratings
Review scores
| Source | Rating |
|---|---|
| AllMusic | 3.5/5 stars |
| Classic Rock | 8/10 stars |

Alter Bridge: Live at Wembley – European Tour 2011 is the second concert film and live album by American rock band Alter Bridge. The DVD was filmed at the band's largest headline show at Wembley Arena on November 29, 2011, and was released worldwide on March 26, 2012. The official trailer for Live at Wembley was released on January 5, 2012. Singer Myles Kennedy dedicated the band's performance to the late Freddie Mercury.

== Track listing ==
=== CD ===
Live at Wembley (CD)
| No. | Title | Writer(s) | Length |
|---|---|---|---|
| 1. | "Slip to the Void" | Myles Kennedy, Brian Marshall, Mark Tremonti, Scott Phillips |
| 2. | "Find the Real" | Kennedy, Tremonti |
| 3. | "Ghost of Days Gone By" | Kennedy, Marshall, Tremonti, Phillips |
| 4. | "Come to Life" | Kennedy, Marshall, Tremonti, Phillips |
| 5. | "All Hope Is Gone" | Kennedy, Marshall, Tremonti, Phillips |
| 6. | "Metalingus" | Kennedy, Tremonti |
| 7. | "I Know It Hurts" | Kennedy, Marshall, Tremonti, Phillips |
| 8. | "Coeur d'Alene" | Kennedy, Marshall, Tremonti, Phillips |
| 9. | "Blackbird (Intro)" (The Beatles cover) / "Blackbird" | John Lennon, Paul McCartney, Kennedy, Marshall, Tremonti, Phillips |
| 10. | "Wonderful Life" (acoustic version) | Kennedy, Marshall, Tremonti, Phillips |
| 11. | "Watch Over You" (acoustic version) | Kennedy, Marshall, Tremonti, Phillips |
| 12. | "Ties That Bind" | Kennedy, Marshall, Tremonti, Phillips |
| 13. | "Jazz Tease" / "Isolation" | Kennedy, Marshall, Tremonti, Phillips |
| 14. | "Dueling Guitar Solos" / "Rise Today" | Kennedy, Marshall, Tremonti, Phillips |

=== DVD ===
Live at Wembley (DVD)
| No. | Title | Writer(s) | Length |
|---|---|---|---|
| 1. | "Slip to the Void" | Kennedy, Marshall, Tremonti, Phillips |
| 2. | "Find the Real" | Kennedy, Tremonti |
| 3. | "Ghost of Days Gone By" | Kennedy, Marshall, Tremonti, Phillips |
| 4. | "Before Tomorrow Comes" | Kennedy, Marshall, Tremonti, Phillips |
| 5. | "Come to Life" | Kennedy, Marshall, Tremonti, Phillips |
| 6. | "All Hope Is Gone" | Kennedy, Marshall, Tremonti, Phillips |
| 7. | "White Knuckles" | Kennedy, Marshall, Tremonti, Phillips |
| 8. | "Brand New Start" | Kennedy, Marshall, Tremonti, Phillips |
| 9. | "Metalingus" | Kennedy, Tremonti |
| 10. | "Broken Wings" | Tremonti |
| 11. | "I Know It Hurts" | Kennedy, Marshall, Tremonti, Phillips |
| 12. | "One Day Remains" | Kennedy, Tremonti |
| 13. | "Coeur d'Alene" | Kennedy, Marshall, Tremonti, Phillips |
| 14. | "Buried Alive" | Kennedy, Marshall, Tremonti, Phillips |
| 15. | "Blackbird (Intro)" (The Beatles cover) / "Blackbird" | John Lennon, Paul McCartney, Kennedy, Marshall, Tremonti, Phillips |
| 16. | "Wonderful Life" (acoustic version) | Kennedy, Marshall, Tremonti, Phillips |
| 17. | "Watch Over You" (acoustic version) | Kennedy, Marshall, Tremonti, Phillips |
| 18. | "Ties That Bind" | Kennedy, Marshall, Tremonti, Phillips |
| 19. | "Jazz Tease" / "Isolation" | Kennedy, Marshall, Tremonti, Phillips |
| 20. | "Open Your Eyes" | Kennedy, Tremonti |
| 21. | "Dueling Guitar Solos" |
| 22. | "Rise Today" | Kennedy, Marshall, Tremonti, Phillips |

== Personnel ==
Band members

- Myles Kennedy — lead vocals, rhythm and lead guitar
- Mark Tremonti — lead and rhythm guitar, backing vocals
- Brian Marshall — bass
- Scott Phillips — drums

Production

- Daniel Catullo — director
- Lionel Pasamonte, Daniel Catullo — production
- Chris Labarbara, Stuart Margolis, Paul Geary, Steve Wood — executive producers
- Brian Sperber — mixing
- Chris Gendrin, Noah Berlow, Brian Katowski — editor
- Ted Kenney — 3D direction
- Rudy Schlacher, Marianna Schlacher, David Chiesa, Carl Schlacher — 3D executive production
