= My Champion =

2016 song by Alter Bridge

Single by Alter Bridge

from the album The Last Hero
- Released: September 8, 2016
- Genre: Alternative metal
- Length: 4:41
- Label: Napalm; Caroline
- Songwriters: Myles Kennedy; Brian Marshall; Mark Tremonti; Scott Phillips
- Producer: Michael "Elvis" Baskette

Alter Bridge singles chronology
| "Show Me a Leader" (2016) | "My Champion" (2016) | "Wouldn't You Rather" (2019) |

Music video
- "My Champion" on YouTube

"My Champion" is a song written and performed by Alter Bridge, released as the second single from the band's fifth album, The Last Hero.

== Personnel ==
Alter Bridge

- Myles Kennedy – lead and backing vocals, rhythm and lead guitar
- Mark Tremonti – lead guitar
- Brian Marshall – bass
- Scott Phillips – drums

Production

- Michael "Elvis" Baskette – production
- Ted Jensen – mastering

== Chart performance ==
| Chart (2016) | Peak position |
|---|---|
| Czech Republic Rock (IFPI) | 4 |
| US Mainstream Rock (Billboard) | 18 |
