= Show Me a Leader =

Single by Alter Bridge

from the album The Last Hero
- Released: July 26, 2016
- Genre: Alternative metal
- Length: 5:05
- Label: Napalm; Caroline
- Songwriters: Myles Kennedy; Brian Marshall; Mark Tremonti; Scott Phillips
- Producer: Michael "Elvis" Baskette

Alter Bridge singles chronology
"Waters Rising" (2014)	"Show Me a Leader" (2016)	"My Champion" (2016)

Music video
- "Show Me a Leader" on YouTube

"Show Me a Leader" is a song by American rock band Alter Bridge, released as the lead single from the band's fifth album, The Last Hero. It was made available as a digital download on July 26, 2016, by Napalm Records, the band's first release on the label, except in the United States, where it was released by Alter Bridge Recordings via Caroline Records. The song's music video was released online on August 31, 2016.

== Background ==
"Show Me a Leader" was first streamed on SiriusXM's Octane on July 25, 2016, followed by a digital release the following day.

== Composition ==
According to singer Myles Kennedy, "Lyrically, [the song] reflects the frustrations that a lot of people are feeling with the current state of the world. The world is looking for trustworthy effective leadership and not this undignified dog and pony show that's really made a mockery of our system." He claims that the song "doesn't push an agenda; it simply expresses a very common sense of disillusionment people seem to be feeling at this point in time." Regarding the song's musical composition, lead guitarist Mark Tremonti said that Kennedy originally came up with the song's intro, and a part he had been working on himself became the chorus. It is also Alter Bridge's first time using seven-string guitars on a record. The song, like the rest of the album, was produced by Michael Baskette, who has worked with Alter Bridge since its 2007 album Blackbird.

== Personnel ==
Musicians

- Myles Kennedy — lead and backing vocals, rhythm and lead guitar
- Mark Tremonti — lead guitar
- Brian Marshall — bass
- Scott Phillips — drums

Production

- Michael "Elvis" Baskette — production
- Ted Jensen — mastering

== Chart performance ==
Chart (2016)	Peak position
German Alternative Singles (Deutsche Alternative Charts)	10
US Mainstream Rock (Billboard)	16
