= Cry of Achilles =

Single by Alter Bridge

from the album Fortress
- Released: April 22, 2014
- Genre: Progressive metal
- Length: 6:30
- Songwriters: Myles Kennedy; Brian Marshall; Mark Tremonti; Scott Phillips
- Producer: Michael "Elvis" Baskette

Alter Bridge singles chronology
"Addicted to Pain" (2013)	"Cry of Achilles" (2014)	"Waters Rising" (2014)

Music video
- "Cry of Achilles" on YouTube

"Cry of Achilles" is a song by American rock band Alter Bridge. It is the second single from the band's fourth studio album Fortress and was released on April 22, 2014.

The song along with "Addicted to Pain" were featured in the 2015 video game Guitar Hero Live.

== Music video ==
The band along with GeneroTV held a project for fans to create their own music video for the song. An animated music video by SiLee Films was chosen as the winner.

(Note that the description below is in chronological order and not in the order shown in the video.)

The King and Queen of a distant, mythical land are taking a romantic stroll in the forest when they come across a magnificent silver tree. Embedded in its trunk lies an exotic jewel. The King is drawn by its intoxicating power and pulls it from its resting place.

Without the jewel at the tree's heart an almighty evil is unleashed. The King, under the jewel's influence, mistakes his Queen for an evil demon and runs his sword through her. Distraught, he blames the demon and the forest for the loss of his beloved wife.

Over the years, the forest sends out demons of increasing size to the King's citadel to retrieve the jewel, but the King constructs his own defense, the Titan, to keep them at bay. The Titan is forged using the magical powers of the jewel and the blood of the King. For many years the Titan fights for the safety of the city and its people under command of the King. The King, knowing that he will not be able to protect his city for much longer, passes the responsibility to his son, the Prince.

However, the Princess has to take control of the Titan after her brother fails to fight off the latest and largest demon. She is given a vision of how the war began when she comes in contact with the demon. The forest needs the jewel to be returned to its rightful place to lock away the evil spirit once more.

The King finally admits the error of his ways and offers the jewel to his daughter so that she may return it to the forest.

== Chart performance ==
Chart (2014)	Peak position
Billboard Hot Mainstream Rock Tracks	27

== Personnel ==
Alter Bridge

- Myles Kennedy – lead vocals, rhythm and lead guitar
- Mark Tremonti – lead and rhythm guitar, backing vocals
- Brian Marshall – bass guitar
- Scott Phillips – drums, percussion

Production

- Michael Baskette – production, mixing, string arrangements
- Jef Moll – engineering, digital editing
- Ted Jensen – mastering
