= DC3 Music Group =

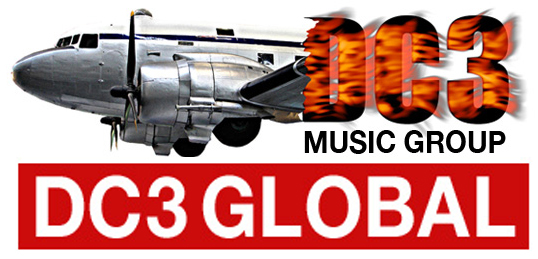
- Website: www.dc3global.com

DC3 Music Group is a multimedia company that films live concerts and behind-the-scenes content. It was founded in 2008 by director and producer Daniel Catullo, Peter Bowers and mobile executive Brian Lisi. DC3 Music Group has produced projects for various artists, including Godsmack, Creed, Chickenfoot, Rage Against the Machine, Staind, Alter Bridge, Slash, Guns N' Roses, Three Days Grace, Stone Temple Pilots, 3 Doors Down, and Daughtry.

The company's distribution network includes EMI in the United States, E-1 in Canada, RSK in the United Kingdom, EMI in parts of Europe, Edel AG in Italy, Roadrunner in Europe, and Soulfood in Germany.

== Early history ==
The company's first project, Live from Amsterdam by Alter Bridge, was filmed in December 2008 at AFAS Live (formerly the Heineken Music Hall) in Amsterdam, directed by Daniel Catullo. It was released in 2009. Since then, the company has produced projects for various artists, including Godsmack, Creed, Chickenfoot, Rage Against the Machine, Staind, Alter Bridge, Slash, Guns N' Roses, Three Days Grace, Stone Temple Pilots, 3 Doors Down, and Daughtry.

== Philanthropy ==
In 2010, DC3 Music Group organized Plane to Haiti, where several artists including Godsmack, David Archuleta, Julianne Hough, New Kids on the Block, Scott Stapp, and Alter Bridge were involved. In collaboration with the Wheelchair Foundation, Medishare, and Partners in Health, the initiative transported over 35 medical professionals to Haiti, established medical clinics and provided treatment to more than 1,000 patients. The group reached Léogâne, near the earthquake’s epicenter, seven days after the disaster.

DC3 Music Group has collaborated with organizations including the Wheelchair Foundation, Creative Visions, and the Global Adolescent Project.

== World Record ==
In 2009, DC3 Music Group produced the concert film Creed Live, broadcast to United States military troops worldwide via the American Forces Network. The production set a Guinness World Record for the most cameras used in a live concert recording, utilizing 249 HD cameras in front of 20,000 audience members. The concert was produced by Peter Bowers and Lionel Pasamonte and directed by Daniel Catullo.

== Partial filmography ==
- 2010: 4 Guinness World Records for Creed Live DVD
- 2009: Gold Award US for Nickelback "Live from Sturgis"
- 2009: Platinum Award Canada for Nickelback "Live from Sturgis"
- 2008: Gold Award US for Smashing Pumpkins "If All Goes Wrong"
- 2008: Gold Award US and Canada for Steve Miller Band - Live From Chicago
- 2008: 7× Platinum Award US for "Rush In Rio"
- 2007 and 2008: 2× Platinum Award US for "Godsmack - Changes"
- 2007: Gold Award US for "Duran Duran Live From London"
- 2006: Classic Rock Mag Award for "Music DVD Of The Year" -Whitesnake Live
- 2006: Platinum Award for "Duran Duran - Live From London" in the U.S.
- 2005: 6× Platinum Award from the RIAA for "Rush In Rio" in the U.S.
- 2005: Gold Award for "Boz Scaggs Greatest Hits Live" in the US
- 2004: Grammy Nomination - "Rush In Rio"
- 2004: Golden Eagle Cine Award - "Gloria Estefan - Live & Unwrapped"
- 2004: JUNO Award - Music DVD Of The Year - "Rush In Rio"
- 2004: Telly Award - "Best TV Or Cable Program/Live Event" Matchbox Twenty
