= Isolation (Alter Bridge song) =

Single by Alter Bridge

from the album AB III
- Released: September 26, 2010
- Genre: Alternative metal
- Length: 3:52 (radio edit); 4:13 (album version)
- Label: Roadrunner; Capitol
- Songwriters: Myles Kennedy; Brian Marshall; Mark Tremonti; Scott Phillips
- Producer: Michael "Elvis" Baskette

Alter Bridge singles chronology
"Before Tomorrow Comes" (2008)	"Isolation" (2010)	"I Know It Hurts" (2011)

Music video
- "Isolation" on YouTube

"Isolation" is a song by American rock band Alter Bridge, released as the first single from its third album, AB III. The song was made available as a digital download on September 26, 2010, in the United Kingdom by Roadrunner Records and October 25, 2010, in the United States by the band's own vanity label. Musically, "Isolation" is heavy and aggressive, featuring the band's style while retaining a melodic chorus and incorporating elements of alternative metal and modern heavy metal. The lyrics explore metaphorically isolating oneself from faith and belief, a common theme throughout the record. A music video for the song was released on December 6, 2010. The song was included in the racing video game Dirt 3 in 2011.

The song impressed music critics, who praised the band members' musical skills displayed in the song, and debuted at No. 34 on Billboard's Hot Mainstream Rock Tracks in October, though the single was originally only released in Britain. Several active rock radio stations in the United States put the song in regular rotation several weeks before its U.S. release. In the U.S., it initially became the most-added song on active rock radio and the 21st most-played active rock radio single, with the fastest increase in rotations out of any rock song at the time. In January 2011, the song reached No. 1 on active rock radio, where it remained for five consecutive weeks, and spent seven weeks at No. 1 on the Hot Mainstream Rock Tracks chart, making it the band's first and to date No. 1 single.

== Background ==
Originally described by singer Myles Kennedy as a "real heavy track," the song was debuted after much anticipation by Roadrunner Records on their website on September 6, 2010, with the announcement that it would be released as the first single from AB III. It was released as a single in the United Kingdom on September 26, 2010, followed by an October 25 release in the United States by the band's own vanity label, Alter Bridge Recordings.

== Composition ==
"Isolation" is four minutes and thirteen seconds long on the album, and was edited down to three minutes and fifty-two seconds for radio airplay. Unlike most Alter Bridge singles, it is very heavy and aggressive, both musically and lyrically, and showcases the band's style, along with elements of speed metal and a strong melody, which has been noted by critics. Guitarist Mark Tremonti described the song as "a more upbeat tune, with some real metal in there – in fact it has a speed metal bridge," while emphasizing, "It has a melodic chorus, though: melody is still the most important thing for us." Myles Kennedy said about the song:

"I remember Mark [Tremonti] playing me the riff and the overall music, and he had some great melodies for it as well. I was just sold, just like, 'That's amazing, it rocks.' So it was pretty early on, I think. When him and I got together and started putting ideas together, that was definitely one of my favorites from the get-go, and I think it was one of his as well just because it's so aggressive and so heavy."

Lyrically, the song is a departure from the uplifting lyrics of most other Alter Bridge singles; it is about "the agony of feeling isolated" and how "the ability to love again can bring you out of it." Kennedy described the song as a continuation of the previous track on the album, "Slip to the Void." He said, "It's the idea that now you're isolated. You're in this new, dark place and [it is about] how you deal with that and the repercussions of that." The rest of the album is a radical aberration from the band's first two albums in terms of subject matter. The song is also unique in that the main guitar solo is performed by Kennedy instead of Tremonti, although Tremonti performs two filler solos.

== Critical reception ==
"Isolation" received positive feedback from several professional reviewers, including Rob Laing from MusicRadar, who praised it for its speed metal influence. He also praised the guitar work and the anthemic approach that the band took towards the dark lyrics. Rick Florino from Artistdirect said that the song "rolls from a thrash breakdown into one of the catchiest refrains that the band has committed to tape." It has received an average of five stars from users on the iTunes Store.

== Music video ==
The music video, directed by Daniel Catullo, premiered on Noisecreep on December 6, 2010. It features video clips of the band's AB III tour as well as cutscenes from their 2009 live DVD Live from Amsterdam. It also shows some rehearsal footage and candid shots of the band interacting with fans. Instead of matching the video with the theme of the song, the band decided to create a "tribute to the fans" for the music video, of which Tremonti said:

"It's a look into the real life of this band and not some put together story. It's a tribute to the fans. It's a look into the tour. We just wanted to show how it is out on tour with us and our interaction with the fans by including them in the video."

== Track listing ==
"Isolation" (album version) – 4:13

== Personnel ==
Musicians

- Myles Kennedy – lead vocals, rhythm guitar
- Mark Tremonti – lead guitar, backing vocals
- Brian Marshall – bass
- Scott Phillips – drums

Production

- Michael "Elvis" Baskette – producer
- Brian Sperber – mixing
- Ted Jensen – mastering

== Charts ==
=== Weekly charts ===
Chart (2010–2011)	Peak position
Canada Rock (Billboard)	18
Czech Republic Rock (IFPI)	2
UK Rock & Metal (Official Charts)	9
US Hot Rock & Alternative Songs (Billboard)	5

=== Year-end charts ===
Chart (2011)	Position
US Hot Rock & Alternative Songs (Billboard)	29
