= The Last Hero (album) =

Studio album by Alter Bridge
- Released: October 7, 2016
- Recorded: January–April 2016
- Studio: Studio Barbarosa, Orlando, Florida; NRG Recording Studios, Los Angeles, California
- Genre: Alternative metal; hard rock; progressive metal
- Length: 66:12
- Label: Caroline; Napalm
- Producer: Michael "Elvis" Baskette; Ben Grosse

Alter Bridge chronology
Fortress (2013)	The Last Hero (2016)	Live at the O2 Arena + Rarities (2017)

Singles from The Last Hero
- 1. "Show Me a Leader" Released: July 26, 2016; 2. "My Champion" Released: September 8, 2016; 3. "Poison in Your Veins" Released: September 23, 2016; 4. "The Other Side" Released: September 30, 2016

The Last Hero is the fifth studio album by American rock band Alter Bridge, released on October 7, 2016, by Napalm Records worldwide except in North America, where it was released on the band's own vanity label. It was produced by longtime collaborator Michael "Elvis" Baskette. The album's first single, "Show Me a Leader", was released digitally and to rock radio on July 26, 2016. On September 8, 2016, "My Champion" was released as the album's second single. Two more songs, "Poison In Your Veins" and "The Other Side", were released on September 23 and September 30, 2016, respectively. Additionally, a music video for "Cradle to the Grave" was released on June 23, 2017. “The Other Side” was used as the entrance music for WWE stable The Judgment Day until the company's deal with the band expired in December 2024.

At a length of 66 minutes and 12 seconds, The Last Hero is Alter Bridge's longest studio album to date.

== Background ==
The Last Hero was written during the winter of 2015, while both singer Myles Kennedy and guitarist Mark Tremonti were on tour with their respective projects (Slash featuring Myles Kennedy and the Conspirators and Tremonti), with the recording process being finished during the spring of 2016. Regarding the sound of the album, Tremonti stated it to be similar to Fortress and Blackbird but they were planning on a darker sound. The album name comes from the subject of being a hero in society and people's feelings of disillusionment with their current leaders. It also marks a departure from the band's previous visual style, with the grungy aesthetic of previous albums replaced with a more streamlined logo.

== Reception ==
Professional ratings
Aggregate scores
Source	Rating
Metacritic	74/100
Review scores
Source	Rating
AllMusic	3.5/5 stars
Classic Rock	4/5 stars
The Guardian	3/5 stars
Rock Sound	7/10

The Last Hero has received generally positive reviews, with critics praising its lyrical themes and the band members' musicianship, though some criticized Michael Baskette's production and the album's long length. It has a score of 74 out of 100 on the review aggregator Metacritic based on 8 reviews, indicating "generally favorable reviews". Dom Lawson from The Guardian gave the album a mixed review with a rating of three out of five stars. He praised the album's heavy sound, but said he felt that nearly "every last second of The Last Hero is purposefully, relentlessly bombastic" and that listening to the album from start to finish is an "exhausting" exercise. He concluded by saying that he felt the band was "trying too hard". Timothy Monger from AllMusic felt that the album stays within the band's "tried and true" sound and does not stray far from what listeners will expect, but overall liked the album, praising Tremonti's guitar playing and Kennedy's vocal performance. He gave it three-and-a-half stars out of five. TeamRock's Grant Moon gave the album four stars out of five and highly praised its lyrical themes, but lambasted Baskette's production, saying he "produces this all to within an inch of its life". He concluded by calling the album "a bold, bombastic rock album that really chimes with our troubled times". In a review of the band's performance with Parallax Orchestra in October 2017, writer Dom Lawson referred to The Last Hero as "stodgy and overproduced".

== Track listing ==
All tracks are written by Alter Bridge.

No.	Title	Length
1.	"Show Me a Leader"	5:05
2.	"The Writing on the Wall"	4:28
3.	"The Other Side"	5:55
4.	"My Champion"	4:41
5.	"Poison in Your Veins"	4:19
6.	"Cradle to the Grave"	5:41
7.	"Losing Patience"	4:10
8.	"This Side of Fate"	6:48
9.	"You Will Be Remembered"	4:42
10.	"Crows on a Wire"	4:27
11.	"Twilight"	4:15
12.	"Island of Fools"	5:01
13.	"The Last Hero"	6:42
Total length:		66:12

Limited edition
No.	Title	Length
14.	"Symphony of Agony" (erroneously listed as "Last of Our Kind")	5:34
Total length:		71:46

Best Buy exclusive edition
No.	Title	Length
14.	"Symphony of Agony" (erroneously listed as "Last of Our Kind")	5:34
15.	"Breathe"	4:17
Total length:		75:55

== Personnel ==
Alter Bridge

- Myles Kennedy – lead vocals, guitar
- Mark Tremonti – guitar, backing vocals
- Brian Marshall – bass
- Scott Phillips – drums

Production

- Michael "Elvis" Baskette – production, mixing, string arrangements, keyboards
- Jef Moll – engineering, digital editing
- Ted Jensen – mastering
- Daniel Tremonti – cover art
- Ben Grosse – production, mixing on "Breathe"
- Tom Baker – mastering on "Breathe"

== Charts ==
Chart (2016)	Peak position
Australian Albums (ARIA)	6
Austrian Albums (Ö3 Austria)	6
Belgian Albums (Ultratop Flanders)	19
Belgian Albums (Ultratop Wallonia)	30
Canadian Albums (Billboard)	15
Dutch Albums (Album Top 100)	10
Finnish Albums (Suomen virallinen lista)	44
French Albums (SNEP)	82
German Albums (Offizielle Top 100)	5
Hungarian Albums (MAHASZ)	24
Irish Albums (IRMA)	30
Italian Albums (FIMI)	8
Japanese Albums Chart	72
New Zealand Heatseekers Albums (RMNZ)	1
Scottish Albums (OCC)	2
Spanish Albums (PROMUSICAE)	93
Swedish Albums (Sverigetopplistan)	33
Swiss Albums (Schweizer Hitparade)	5
UK Albums (OCC)	3
UK Album Downloads (OCC)	2
UK Independent Albums (OCC)	1
UK Rock & Metal Albums (OCC)	2
US Billboard 200	8
US Independent Albums (Billboard)	1
US Top Hard Rock Albums (Billboard)	1
