= Addicted to Pain =

Single by Alter Bridge

from the album Fortress
- Released: August 12, 2013
- Genre: Heavy metal; speed metal
- Length: 4:16
- Label: Roadrunner
- Songwriters: Myles Kennedy; Mark Tremonti
- Producer: Michael "Elvis" Baskette

Alter Bridge singles chronology
"Ghost of Days Gone By" (2011)	"Addicted to Pain" (2013)	"Cry of Achilles" (2014)

Music video
- "Addicted to Pain" on YouTube

"Addicted to Pain" is a song by American rock band Alter Bridge. Written by lead vocalist Myles Kennedy and lead guitarist Mark Tremonti, it was released as the lead single from the band's fourth studio album Fortress on August 12, 2013, in Europe and on August 20, 2013, in the US. The song peaked at number 4 on the US Billboard Mainstream Rock chart and reached the top 20 of several other Billboard charts.

== Background and release ==
"Addicted to Pain" was one of the first songs written during sessions for Fortress, which vocalist Myles Kennedy claimed helped the band to progress with the writing of the rest of the album, as well as encouraging them to be "more experimental". According to lead guitarist Mark Tremonti, Kennedy wrote the lyrics to the track in response to "somebody close to him ... venting about his problems". The song was first made available for online streaming on August 7, 2013, on Alter Bridge's YouTube channel, before it was officially released as the first single from Fortress on August 20. Speaking in a track-by-track feature of the album, Tremonti explained that the band chose the song as the album's lead single due to the success of "Isolation", the first release from 2010's AB III, which he compared to the Fortress track as a "more aggressive song ... that's straight to the point". The song was later featured as a playable track on the 2015 video game Guitar Hero Live.

== Music video ==
The music video for "Addicted to Pain", directed by Daniel Catullo, was released on September 5, 2013. In North America, it was initially exclusive to the website Loudwire. Writing for the website, Mary Oullette described the video as featuring the group performing "on a large stage decked out with three monstrous video screens towering behind [them]", interspersed with footage related to the lyrics of the song including "someone being set on fire in a crowd" and "an antique car [being] left on train tracks only to meet its impending doom".

== Reception ==
=== Commercial ===
"Addicted to Pain" peaked on several Billboard charts in the United States: number 4 on the Mainstream Rock Songs chart, number 8 on the Hard Rock Digital Songs chart, number 12 on the Active Rock chart, number 14 on the Heritage Rock chart, and number 20 on the Rock Airplay chart. Outside of the US, the single reached number 150 on the UK Singles Chart on August 24, 2013. The single spent 30 weeks on the Mainstream Rock chart, more than any other release by the band.

=== Critical ===
Media response to "Addicted to Pain" was generally positive. In a review of Fortress for Loudwire, Mary Oullette described the song as "a straight-forward screaming rocker with blazing guitar riffs and melody driven choruses", praising it as a "perfect radio-ready track". Similarly, Chad Bowar for Loudwire noted that it "features first-class riffage and a blazing solo", describing it as "heavy, but still melodic and accessible enough that radio stations will be more than willing to play it". Upon its release as a single, Rock Sound magazine called it "a hard rockin' banger", while Irish news website Joe described it as a "proper head-banger of a tune". Melodic magazine praised the track as the band's "fastest fist pumping anthem". The song was included on Loudwire's 66 Best Hard Rock Songs of the 21st Century.

== Chart positions ==
Chart (2013)	Peak position
Czech Republic Rock (IFPI)	5
UK Singles (OCC)	150
US Active Rock (Billboard)	12
US Hard Rock Digital Songs (Billboard)	8
US Heritage Rock (Billboard)	14
US Mainstream Rock Songs (Billboard)	4
US Rock Airplay (Billboard)	20
