= Blackbird (Alter Bridge song) =

2007 song by Alter Bridge

Song by Alter Bridge

from the album Blackbird
- Released: October 5, 2007
- Recorded: c. February–May 2007
- Studio: Blackbird (Nashville, Tennessee)
- Genre: Heavy metal; progressive metal; post-grunge
- Length: 7:58
- Label: Universal Republic
- Songwriters: Myles Kennedy; Mark Tremonti; Brian Marshall; Scott Phillips
- Producer: Michael "Elvis" Baskette

"Blackbird" is a song by American rock band Alter Bridge from their album Blackbird, which was released on October 5, 2007, by Universal Republic. At nearly eight minutes long, it was the band's longest song until overtaken by "Fable of the Silent Son" 15 years later. It has received critical acclaim, often cited as the crowning point of both the album and the band's career by critics, fans, and the band members themselves. In March 2011, Guitarist magazine listed the song's guitar solo, which is performed by both Myles Kennedy and Mark Tremonti, as the greatest guitar solo of all time.

== Background ==
"Blackbird" appears as the eighth track on Alter Bridge's 2007 Blackbird. It was composed and arranged by Alter Bridge, and the lyrics were written by lead vocalist and rhythm guitarist Myles Kennedy, who said that the creation of the song was difficult and that it took a long time. "We beat our heads against the wall for months," he told TuneLab, "so when it finally came together it was a good moment." He also said that he feels that "Blackbird" is one of the most gratifying songs that the band has ever written. The song is inspired by Kennedy's friend Mark Morse, who died as the song was being written:

"Blackbird" was inspired lyrically by a friend of mine named Mark Morse. He sold me my first guitar when I was a kid, and we stayed friends for years and years. He actually passed away right as that song was being completed so it was dedicated to him and his memory. It's really about seeing the suffering he was going through and hoping he would find his solace soon and be free from all of that.

Kennedy explained that the idea for the chorus of the song came from an experience in the recording studio:

We were all in a room and Mark [Tremonti] had had that really haunting killer guitar part that starts the song out. And we were trying to find a chorus for it, so we were banging it out for a few hours and weren't having luck, so I went into the other room. And they were still working on something, and there was an urban dance group in the next room, because it's a rehearsal studio. And there was just this cacophony of sound: I heard them, and I heard this over here, and it was just noise. And it was weird—it was like, out of those two noises, even though they were playing something completely different, came this idea for the chorus of "Blackbird."

A live version of the song appears on the band's 2009 concert film Live from Amsterdam. The opening guitar piece of The Beatles' song of the same name is performed by Kennedy as an introduction for the song.

== Reception and recognition ==
Reception towards "Blackbird" has been extremely positive since its release. Vik Bansal from musicOMH referred to "Blackbird" as the album's pièce de résistance and stated, "An eight-minute paean to a lost loved one, it never comes close to sounding mawkish and instead counterpoints an ascendant tune with doomy, emotionally-charged riffs that somehow create a general sense of uplifting." In their review for the album, Ultimate Guitar Archive said that the song "starts out like any other rock ballad you might hear, but by the end you’ve been taken in every which direction." Sharon Mawer of Allmusic said, "It was on the title track with eight minutes of powerful emotions at work that the band really shone, the song alternating between a hard rock guitar riff-heavy number and an acoustic ballad about the loss of a loved one."

In addition to being a fan favorite, the members of the band have also cited the song as their favorite. Kennedy said in an interview with Hardrock Haven that he feels that the song is one of his top five musical achievements. When asked about the song in an interview with Rob Laing from MusicRadar, Kennedy said, "That was a really special song, I'll never forget how it felt when we'd completed that. We tapped into something that doesn't come along on every record, that's for sure. We were really happy that the people who support us really embraced it as well."

In February 2011, Guitarist named the song's two back-to-back guitar solos, which are respectively played by vocalist and guitarist Myles Kennedy and lead guitarist Mark Tremonti, as collectively the greatest guitar solo of all time. In a poll allowing readers to vote, the song won and defeated performances by famous rock guitarists such as Slash, Eddie Van Halen, Jimmy Page, Jimi Hendrix, John Petrucci, Steve Vai, and David Gilmour by a wide margin. Guitarist posted via X that Alter Bridge's victory in the poll was "astonishing."

In 2024, the staff of Consequence included the song in their list of "50 Kick-Butt Post-Grunge Songs We Can Get Behind". In 2026, British radio station Planet Rock announced that listeners had voted "Blackbird" the eighth greatest rock song of all time.

== Credits and personnel ==
Alter Bridge

- Myles Kennedy – lead vocals, lead and rhythm guitar
- Mark Tremonti – lead guitar, backing vocals
- Brian Marshall – bass guitar
- Scott Phillips – drums

Production

- Michael "Elvis" Baskette – production
