= Alter Bridge =

American rock band

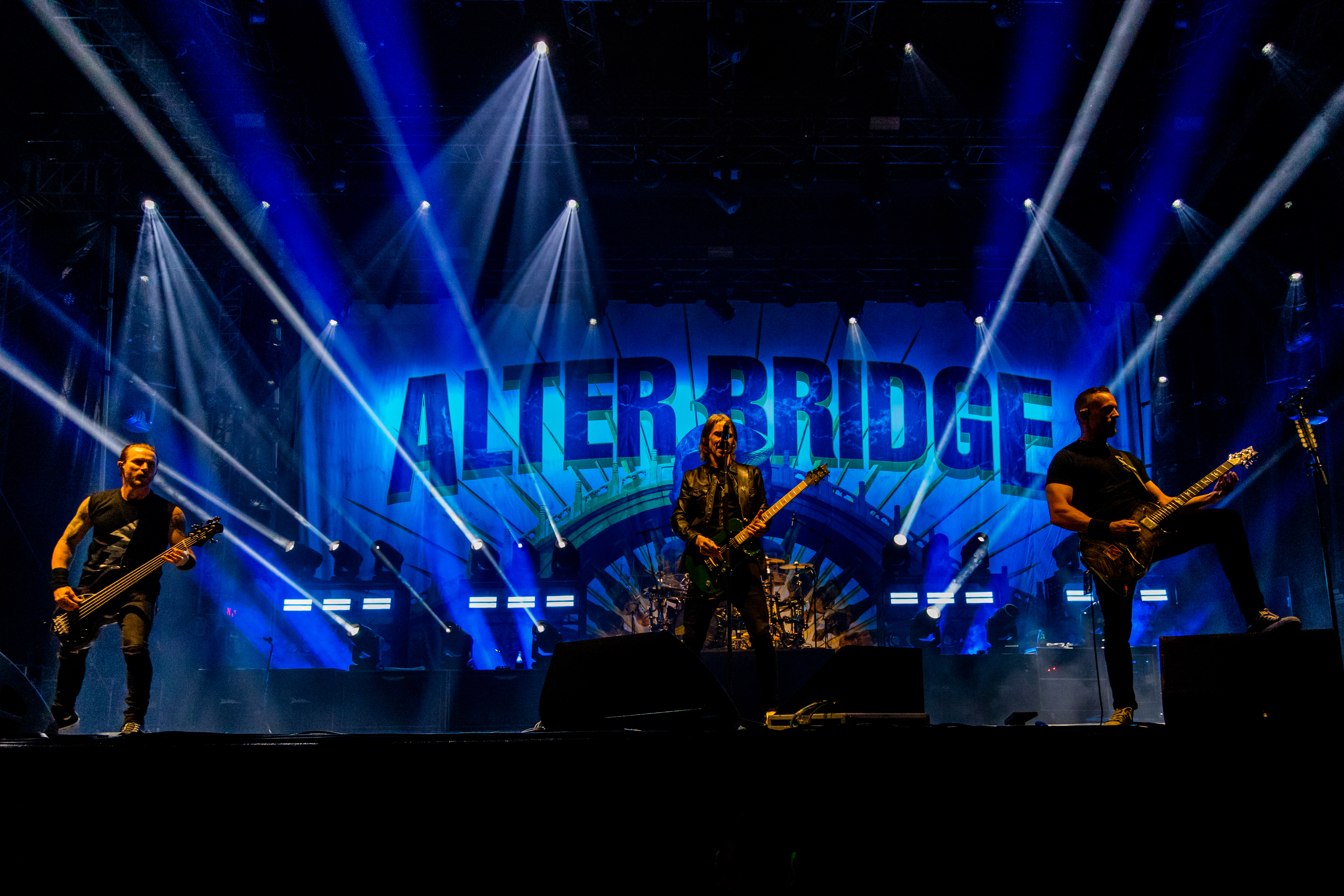
- Alter Bridge performing in 2023

Background information
- Origin: Orlando, Florida, U.S.
- Genres: Hard rock; heavy metal; alternative metal; progressive metal
- Years active: 2004–present
- Labels: Wind-up; Universal Republic; Roadrunner; Napalm
- Spinoff of: Creed
- Members: Myles Kennedy; Mark Tremonti; Brian Marshall; Scott Phillips
- Website: alterbridge.com

Alter Bridge is an American rock band from Orlando, Florida. The band was formed in 2004 by lead vocalist and rhythm guitarist Myles Kennedy, lead guitarist Mark Tremonti, bassist Brian Marshall and drummer Scott Phillips. After their former band Creed became inactive in 2003, Tremonti and Phillips formed a new band with former bandmate Marshall and new member Kennedy; Alter Bridge was formally unveiled in January 2004, months before Creed's official breakup in June.

After signing with Wind-up Records, Alter Bridge released their debut album One Day Remains in August 2004, much of which was written by Tremonti the previous year. The album received mixed reviews but reached No. 5 on the U.S. Billboard 200 and was certified gold by the Recording Industry Association of America in November 2004. The band's second album followed in 2007 with the more positively-reviewed Blackbird, which marked the beginning of a long partnership between the band and producer Michael Baskette. The album reached No. 13 in the U.S. and was certified silver by the British Phonographic Industry.

Following continued activities with the members' other bands and side projects, Alter Bridge released AB III in 2010. It received critical acclaim and commercial success on Roadrunner Records, with its lead single "Isolation" topping the Billboard Mainstream Rock chart. Alter Bridge released Fortress to further acclaim in 2013, as the band's members continued splitting their time between various projects. The Last Hero followed on Napalm Records in 2016, becoming the band's first album since its debut to reach the top ten of the Billboard 200, and its first to reach the top five of the UK Albums Chart. Their sixth studio album, Walk the Sky, was released in 2019, and was followed by Walk the Sky 2.0 in 2020. Alter Bridge's seventh album Pawns & Kings was released on October 14, 2022. The band's eighth studio album Alter Bridge was released on January 9, 2026.

As of 2023, Alter Bridge has sold over 5 million records worldwide.

== History ==
The group's original logo

=== 2004–2005: One Day Remains ===
Before forming Alter Bridge, Tremonti, Marshall, and Phillips were members of the rock band Creed together with lead vocalist Scott Stapp. They achieved mainstream success in the late 1990s and early 2000s, with the albums, My Own Prison (1997) and Human Clay (1999). Marshall left Creed in 2000, which was followed by the release of their third album, Weathered in 2001. The band became inactive in 2003 following the conclusion of a controversial tour. That same year, Tremonti began writing new material with plans of forming a new band with Phillips and Marshall. Being fans of Myles Kennedy's former band, The Mayfield Four, they invited him to join as their new lead vocalist. They named the new band Alter Bridge, after an actual bridge near Tremonti's home on Alter Road in Detroit, and subsequently began recording their debut album.

Citing creative differences and increasing tension between Stapp and the other band members, Creed officially broke up in June 2004. Coincidentally, Alter Bridge released their debut single "Open Your Eyes" on June 11, 2004. The band members felt as if Creed had "run their course" and were determined to focus on their future with their new singer. Alter Bridge's debut album, One Day Remains, was released on August 10, 2004, by Wind-up Records and received mixed reviews. Produced by Ben Grosse (who has also produced albums by artists such as Filter, Fuel, and Sevendust), the album sold 750,000 copies worldwide and achieved gold status. It peaked at No. 5 on the Billboard charts for fourteen weeks. After "Open Your Eyes", two more singles were released from the album in 2005: "Find the Real" and "Broken Wings". As the album was near completion by the time Kennedy joined the band, he does not feature as a guitarist, but did co-write some of the lyrics.

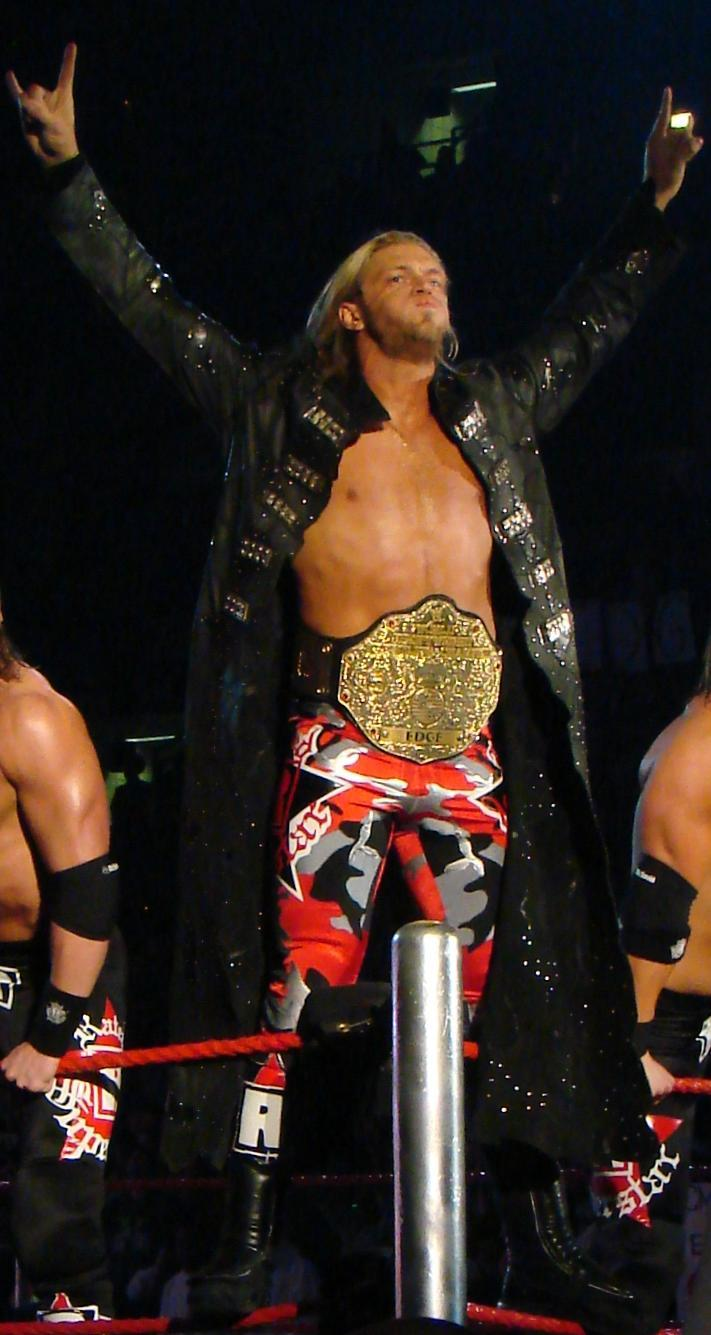
WWE wrestler Edge popularized the band's song "Metalingus" once he made it his entrance theme in 2004

Several songs from One Day Remains established an affiliation with WWE. Most notably, "Metalingus" was adopted by wrestler and Hall of Famer "The Rated R Superstar" Edge as his entrance theme in 2004, along with continuing to use the theme in AEW under the ring name Cope. In 2022, Edge used "The Other Side" for a brief while, and that song was later used for the Judgment Day faction up until 2024 Alter Bridge would later appear with Edge in a backstage segment on an episode of WWE Raw in 2005. An edited version of "Open Your Eyes" was used in the video game Madden NFL 2005. Alter Bridge released a rare instrumental song called "Ahavo Rabo Taco Salad" for Total Guitar magazine in 2005. Originally, it was solely a Mark Tremonti song, but the rest of Alter Bridge soon got involved. A song called "Save Me" was included on the soundtrack for the 2005 Marvel film Elektra. The soundtrack for another 2005 Marvel film, Fantastic Four, also featured an Alter Bridge song, "Shed My Skin". That same year, the band released a four-song EP called Fan EP as a promotional CD in Europe.

Alter Bridge's relationship with Wind-up Records, who did not share the band's vision, began to deteriorate when band members began hearing rumors of the record label deciding not to release singles or promote the album as promised. The band had been asking to be released from the label shortly after the release of One Day Remains, but their request was consistently declined. Sometime before 2006, Alter Bridge & Wind-up Records were "finally able to negotiate terms acceptable to both sides". All recording, publishing, and merchandising agreements were finally terminated. The true nature of the agreement was later described by Mark Tremonti in a LoudWire interview as "being screwed over", where he revealed that Alter Bridge had to “buy out” their agreement for an undisclosed sum, for which they were still paying off. However, Alter Bridge continued to face difficulties, including criticism for disbanding Creed, pressure to reform Creed, and numerous false reports of a Creed reunion, in addition to some critics describing Alter Bridge's music as sounding like "Creed with a different singer." Despite Creed later reforming in early 2009, Tremonti responded to these claims by stating that "Creed will never exist as a band again."

=== 2007–2008: Blackbird ===
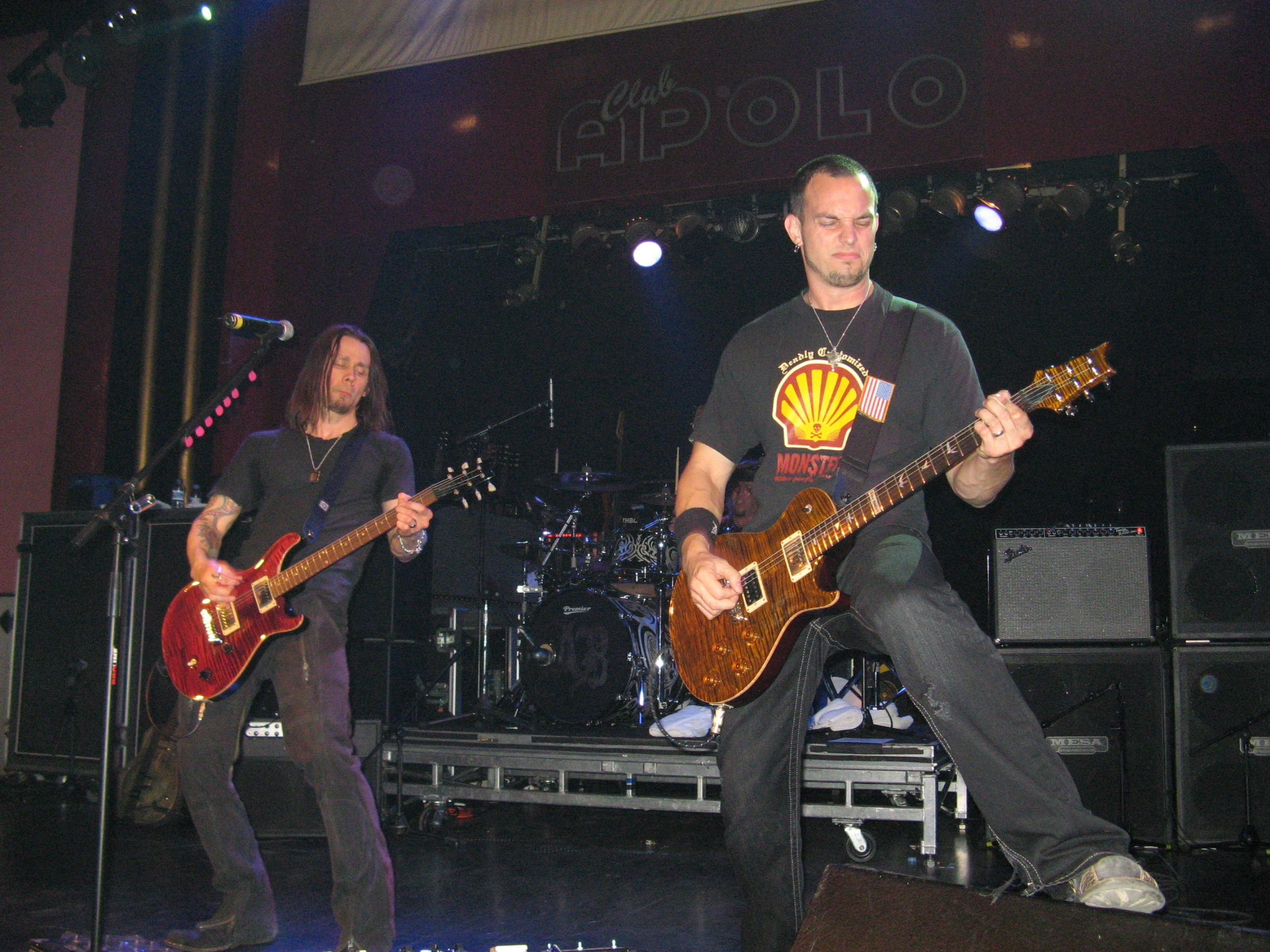
Alter Bridge toured extensively in promotion of 2007's Blackbird.

In 2007, Alter Bridge signed a record deal with Universal Republic Records. Tremonti said of the band's new material, "I think it's the best work we've ever done." Alter Bridge's second album, Blackbird, featuring the successful singles "Rise Today" and "Watch Over You", was released on October 9, 2007. "Watch Over You" was featured in VH1's Celebrity Rehab with Dr. Drew in 2008 and its music video featured clips from the series. Another version of the song featuring Cristina Scabbia of Lacuna Coil is available in the United Kingdom. Blackbird received very positive reviews from critics, and currently holds an average of 9.4 out of 10 on Ultimate Guitar Archive. The album also featured the critically acclaimed title track, the guitar solo of which would later be lauded by Guitarist by reaching No. 1 on their 2011 list of the greatest guitar solos of all time.

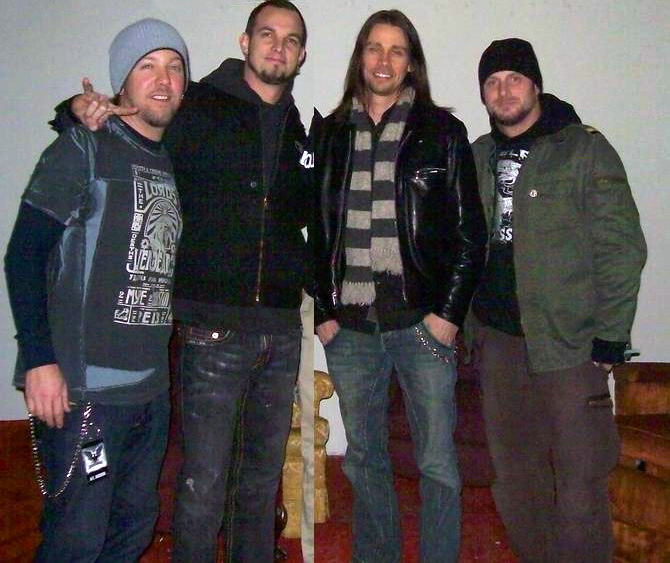
Alter Bridge in 2008

The band embarked on a successful world tour in support of Blackbird, recording their December 7, 2008 show at the Heineken Music Hall in Amsterdam, Netherlands, for a live DVD titled Live from Amsterdam. A single disc version was sold exclusively at venues during the Creed reunion tour in 2009 and on Amazon.com. Released to extremely positive reviews, the DVD sold "thousands and thousands" of copies as opposed to the projected "hundreds" that Amazon expected to sell, reached No. 1 on Amazon's "Bestsellers in Music Videos & Concerts", and remained there for several weeks. A Blu-ray Disc version and a deluxe edition released in stores in North America on January 11, 2011.

Alter Bridge took a break in 2009 following Creed's reunion tour and new album. While Tremonti, Marshall, and Phillips were touring with Scott Stapp as Creed, Kennedy worked on his first solo album and began working extensively with Guns N' Roses and Velvet Revolver lead guitarist Slash, and later touring with Slash throughout 2010 and 2011 as his lead vocalist.

=== 2010–2012: AB III ===
Alter Bridge began the recording process of their third album from February through May 2010. On July 17, 2010, Billboard reported that Alter Bridge had signed with Roadrunner Records and that the band would embark on a spring tour with Godsmack in 2011. While the latter report was later denied by the band, Alter Bridge revealed the title of their new album, AB III, along with the track listing on their official website in early August. Roadrunner Records confirmed that the band had signed with them and gave the release date of their new album as October 8, 2010. The first single "Isolation" was released on Roadrunner's website on September 6, 2010. The song became the band's most successful song, reaching No. 1 on active rock radio and on the Hot Mainstream Rock Tracks chart, a first for Alter Bridge. AB III was released in Australia and Germany on October 8, 2010, and in the United Kingdom on October 11, 2010, by Roadrunner Records and in North America on November 9, 2010, on the band's own vanity label, Alter Bridge Recordings, via EMI. The album debuted at No. 17 on the Billboard 200. The music video for "Isolation" premiered on Noisecreep on December 6, 2010. On January 11, 2011, the band finally released its long-awaited live album and concert film, Live from Amsterdam, in stores. Also, "I Know It Hurts" was later released as the second single, in Australia only, on January 21, 2011. "Ghost of Days Gone By" was released as the next single on April 18, 2011, followed by "Wonderful Life" on June 5, 2011, in the United Kingdom.

The band advertised that AB III would be much "darker" than and a lyrical departure from their previous albums, and the album was confirmed to be constructed as a loose concept album. AB III was met with "overwhelming critical acclaim" from professional reviewers upon its release, with MusicRadar calling it "one of the guitar albums of the year." Artistdirect gave AB III a perfect score and called it a "masterpiece". Also, a tribute album to Alter Bridge titled String Tribute to Alter Bridge, which features instrumental classical arrangements of various Alter Bridge songs, was made available on March 8, 2011. On October 25, 2011, Alter Bridge released a special edition of AB III titled AB III.5, which includes three bonus tracks and an hour-long documentary titled One by One.

The band started touring in support of AB III in the fall of 2010 in the United Kingdom with Slaves to Gravity appearing, followed by a tour of the United States with Taddy Porter and Like a Storm. In the spring of 2011, Alter Bridge toured the United States again, this time with Black Stone Cherry and Like a Storm. Alter Bridge performed at several European festivals in the summer of 2011, including the Rock am Ring and Rock im Park festivals, the Nova Rock Festival, the 2011 Download Festival, the 2011 Hellfest Summer Open Air, and several others. Alter Bridge performed a free concert on Jimmy Kimmel Live! on the ABC television network on April 25, 2011. The band also co-headlined the second annual Carnival of Madness Tour in summer 2011 with Theory of a Deadman, with supporting acts Black Stone Cherry, Adelitas Way, and Emphatic. The tour was extended until January 2012, when the band played select dates in Australia, including the Soundwave Festival. The band released a series of webisodes produced by DC3 Music Group detailing their tour. In addition, a second concert film titled Live at Wembley was recorded on November 29, 2011, at Wembley Arena, the band's largest headline show up to that point. It was released worldwide on March 26, 2012, and it will later be released in 3D.

=== 2013–2014: Fortress ===
In 2012, the instrumental members of Alter Bridge turned their attention to their other band, Creed, embarking on a tour. Tremonti emphasized that he is always writing music for both Creed and Alter Bridge. Myles Kennedy turned his attention to his project with Slash, releasing Apocalyptic Love (2012), while Mark Tremonti released a solo album All I Was (2012). Phillips joined a new band called Projected with Sevendust members John Connolly and Vinnie Hornsby, and former Submersed guitarist Eric Friedman, releasing an album called Human.

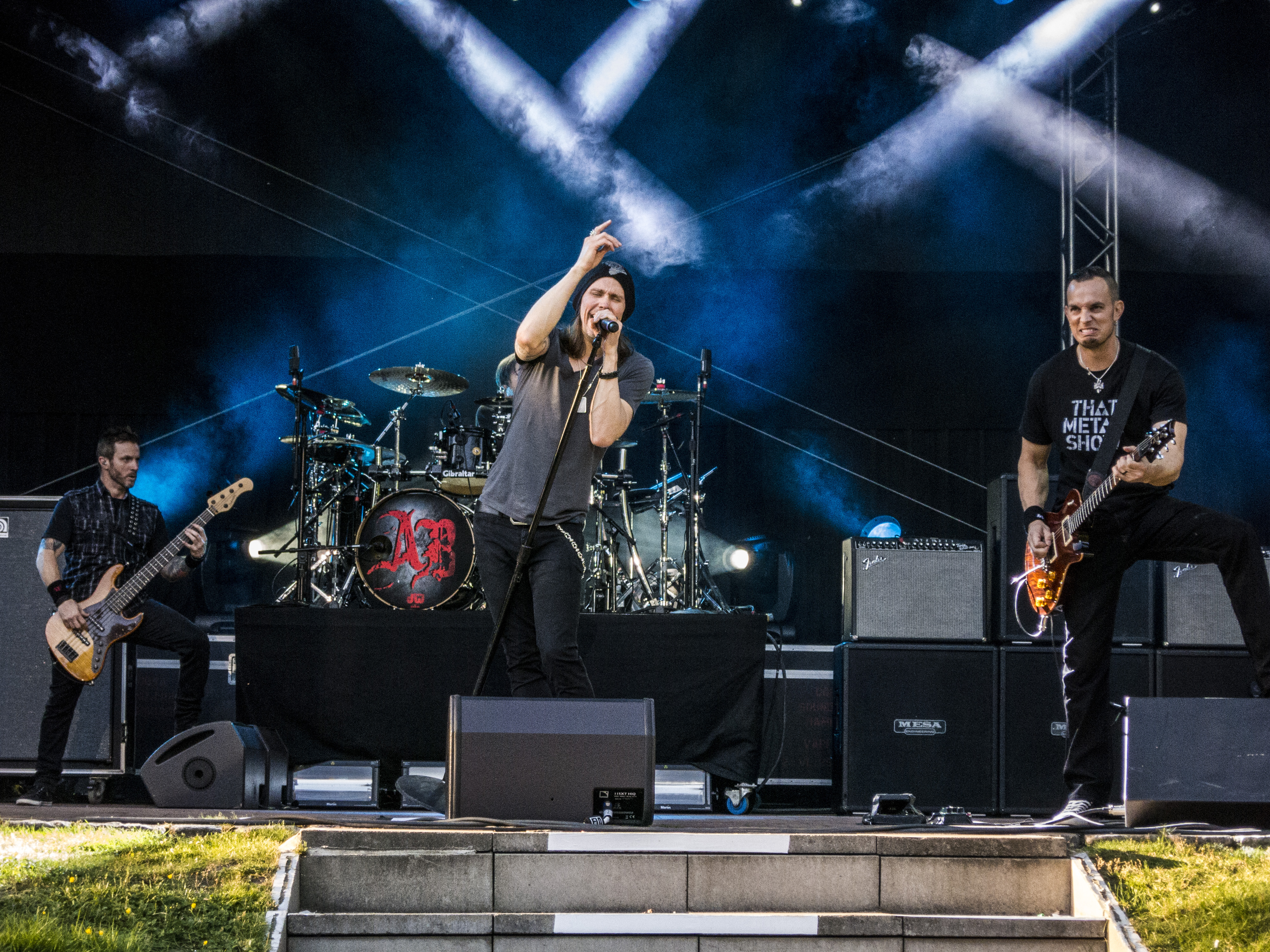
The band returned with Fortress in 2013, which was followed by a European tour and festival dates.

Members of Alter Bridge met in December 2012 to discuss the next album and the band's future tour. They entered the studio in January 2013 to begin recording the new album while touring intermittently with their respective side projects. Recording continued in late April 2013 and lasted till July 2013 with their producer Michael "Elvis" Baskette. The album was confirmed to be called Fortress. On July 31, 2013, Alter Bridge revealed album cover and track listing for Fortress, and the first single, "Addicted to Pain", was officially released on August 12, 2013. Mark Tremonti said that the band tried to "challenge ourselves to get the most out of the arrangements" and that the album is a "high energy record". The band streamed the album in its entirety on the Metal Hammer website as a UK exclusive on September 23. Fortress was released everywhere by September 30, 2013, except in the US, where it was released on October 8. The album received critical acclaim, with Allmusic saying "Fortress is a driving album that not only doesn't feel tired or stale, but is a monster of an album that makes a pretty solid case for being some of Alter Bridge's strongest and most dynamic work to date." Their second and third singles "Cry of Achilles" and "Waters Rising" performed relatively well at the charts, achieving 27 and 15 place at US Hot Mainstream Rock Tracks.

A headline tour of the UK and Europe in support of Fortress with Halestorm and Shinedown commenced on October 16 in Nottingham. Two weeks prior to this the band played a single show in the US, at the House of Blues in Orlando. Alter Bridge played at the Australian music festival, Soundwave in 2014 as an Australian leg of the tour, and also headlined several concerts in fall 2014, including Louder Than Life Festival in Louisville, and continued through the end of the month. They selected California Breed to open dates for them on their October run.

In January 2014, Alter Bridge had planned to release a box set titled Alter Bridge X to commemorate the band's 10th anniversary. The 27-disc collection included all four albums, both concert films, exclusive uncut interviews, every music video, previously unreleased songs and live footage, an autographed poster, and a coffee table book about the history of the band. Only 3,000 copies were made; however, the project experienced significant delays and was not released until September 2014.

In March 2014, a Live in Milan CD and DVD package, similar to that of Live in Amsterdam and Live at Wembley documenting a live show from their recent Fortress Tour, was set for release in June 2014 but later scrapped due to sound issues.

=== 2016–2017: The Last Hero ===
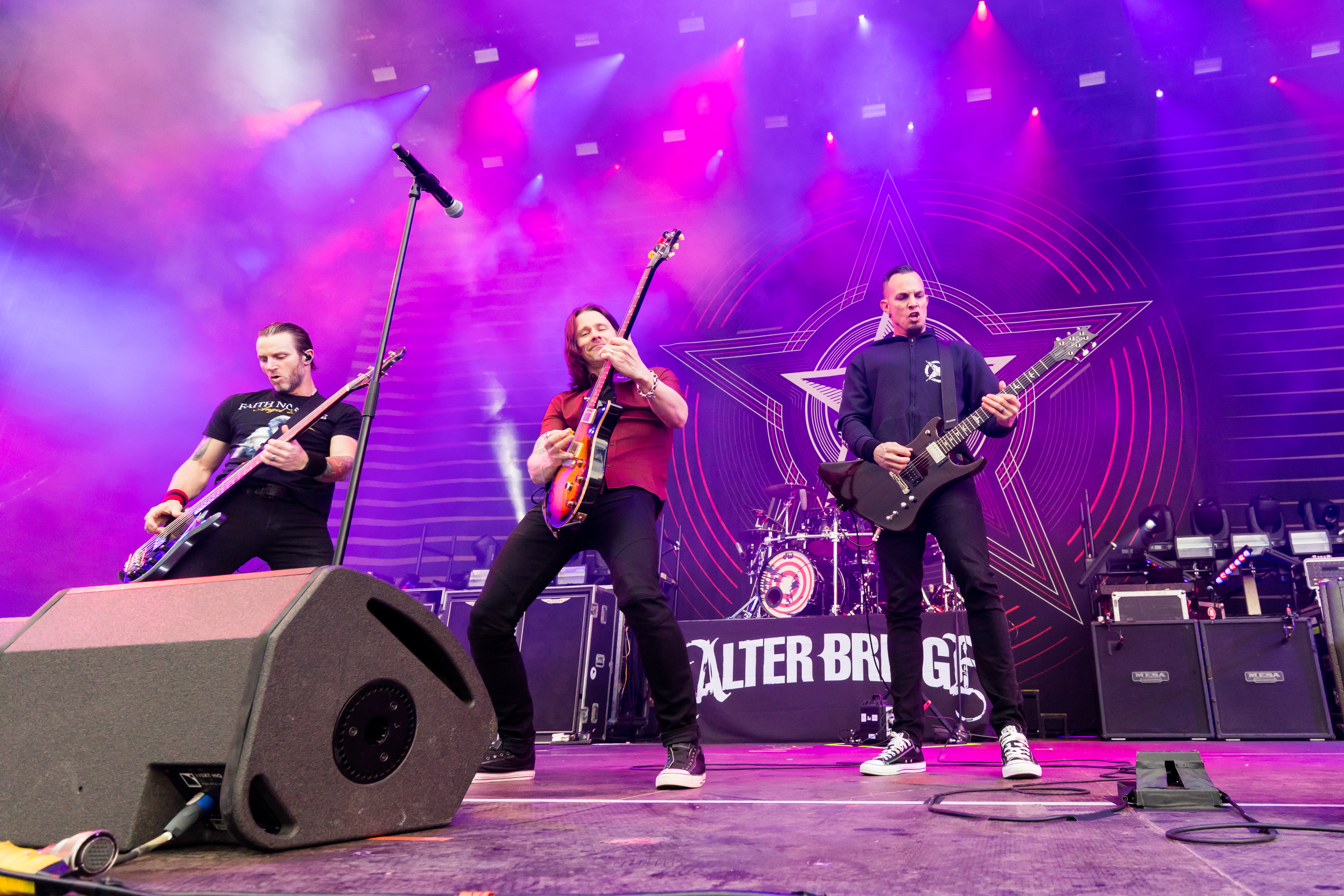
Alter Bridge released their fifth album The Last Hero in October 2016.

In January 2015, the band stated that they would not tour that year but release a new album in 2016. In January 2016, after members of the band had finished working on other projects throughout 2015, Alter Bridge officially began recording their fifth studio album. The record would again be produced by Michael "Elvis" Baskette. The band started selling memorabilia items and goods such as lyrics sheets, used guitar straps, postcards, drumsticks and guitars used for recording the album through Fret 12, a company associated with Tremonti. The band joined Disturbed and Breaking Benjamin on a U.S. tour in the summer of 2016. Tremonti said in May that the band was aiming for a September 2016 release for the new album. Regarding the sound of the album, Tremonti said, "I think it's a good mixture between Fortress and Blackbird; it covers all bases." In June 2016, Alter Bridge signed with Napalm Records for the international release of the album, and later announced they would headline a 2016 United Kingdom tour with Volbeat, Gojira, and Like a Storm. On July 6, 2016, the band revealed the new album's title as The Last Hero; it was released on October 7, 2016. They embarked on a US and Canada Tour in January and February 2017. After that the band toured Australia and New Zealand in early April and returned for three shows in May. In June they embarked on a European Tour, headlining Rock am Ring and Rock im Park, Download Festival and Hellfest. The band played in Ireland for the first time ever in June 2017 and Argentina for the first time in September.

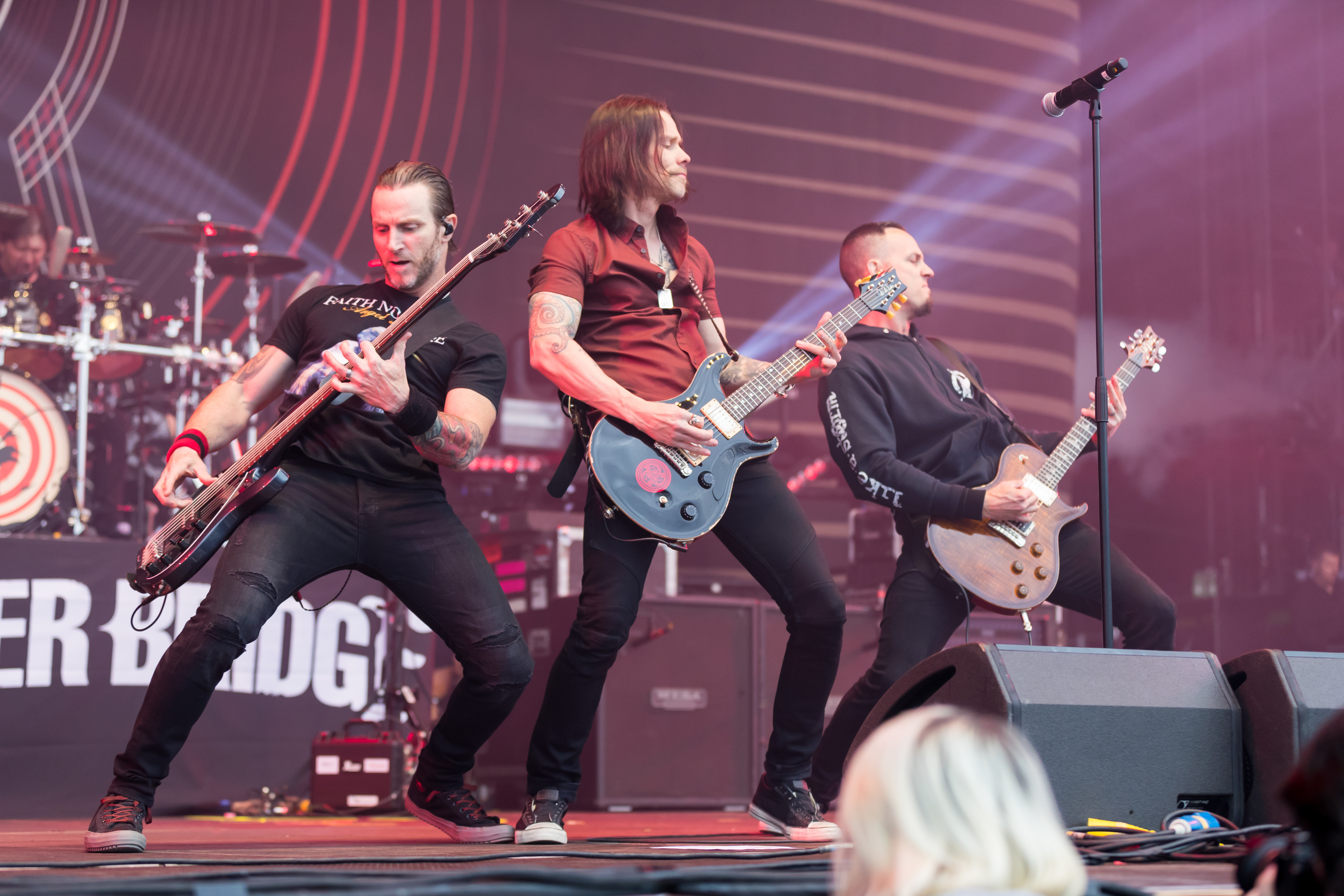
Alter Bridge performing at Rock am Ring in Germany, c. 2017

Alter Bridge released their third live album, Live at the O2 Arena + Rarities, on September 8, 2017, which includes a compilation of bonus tracks from previous albums, including two previously unreleased songs that were recorded in 2004. The band played two shows at the Royal Albert Hall on October 2–3, 2017, alongside the 52-piece Parallax Orchestra as part of another European Tour, with the shows recorded and released on CD/Vinyl/DVD/Blu-Ray release on 7 September 2018. They played 14 dates in the US throughout November and December with support from All That Remains as part of the final installment of the tour supporting The Last Hero.

=== 2019–2021: Walk the Sky ===
In June 2019, Alter Bridge announced a UK arena tour with Shinedown, Sevendust and The Raven Age beginning in December 2019, and that its sixth studio album, Walk the Sky, would be released on October 18, 2019. The album marked one of the most stylistically experimental periods in the band’s career, incorporating loop‑based writing and synth‑wave textures that distinguished it from their earlier, more progressive releases. "It's kinda like a John Carpenter movie — this old-school synth-wave kind of vibe", Mark Tremonti explained in a 2019 interview with Kerrang!, discussing Walk the Sky. "Somebody might hear the record and have no idea that was intended, but for a batch of songs, I tapped into some old loops that I either created or found randomly online, and worked with them in the background to inspire me to go in a different direction. I loved working like that. We challenge ourselves to not repeat ourselves and find new inspiration to add a different layer to what we do. It's particularly challenging when you've had so many records, but when I showed Myles what I was thinking, he absolutely loved it and was on board right away." Much of the material was written individually by Tremonti and Kennedy before being brought together in the studio, resulting in a more streamlined, song‑focused structure compared to the sprawling arrangements of Fortress or The Last Hero. Lyrically, the album explored themes of personal reinvention, mindfulness, and resilience, with tracks such as “Godspeed” serving as tributes to lost friends.

The supporting arena tour was one of the band’s most ambitious, though it was cut short by the global COVID‑19 pandemic in early 2020. Walk The Sky 2.0 (Deluxe) was released November 6, 2020, which included additional bonus live tracks and a new studio track "Last Rites". Written during lockdown, “Last Rites” reflected the darker, uncertain atmosphere of the period and served as a transitional piece between album cycles.

=== 2022–2024: Pawns & Kings ===
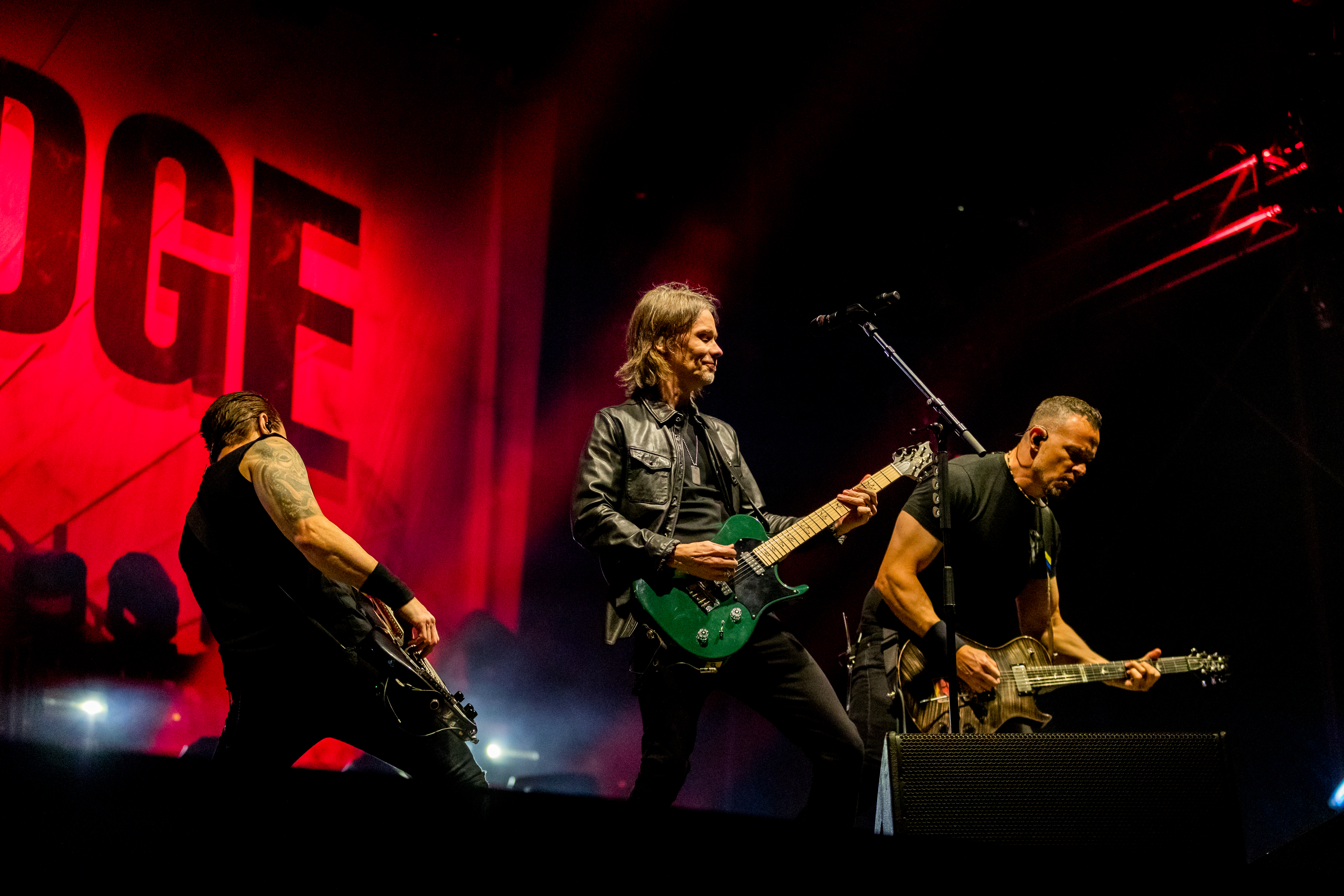
Alter Bridge in 2023

In an interview with the 97.7 QLZ radio station, Mark Tremonti revealed that Alter Bridge's seventh studio album would be called, Pawns & Kings. It was released on October 14, 2022. The album marked a return to the band’s more progressive and heavy tendencies, featuring long‑form compositions and intricate arrangements reminiscent of Fortress. In an interview with Ian Danter of Planet Rocks, Tremonti spoke about the seventh album. "We are very proud of it", He said, "Our producer is absolutely in love with the record. I think if you're a fan of Alter Bridge, you will dig this record. We are very happy with it." Tremonti was then asked about if there will be heavy riffs in the new album with him responding, "There are some heavy riffs on there. And it's funny because the heaviest riffs on the record are from Myles Kennedy." Thematically, the album explored ideas of self‑determination, personal struggle, and the tension between fate and agency, reflected in its chess‑inspired title. Tracks such as “This Is War” and the eight‑minute title track showcased the band’s renewed interest in epic, narrative‑driven songwriting.

On July 18, 2022, the lead single, "Pawns & Kings", was released with the follow-up single, "Silver Tongue", released on August 1, 2022. The album’s supporting world tour became one of Alter Bridge’s most successful post‑pandemic runs, featuring expanded setlists, deeper cuts from earlier albums, and a renewed emphasis on the band’s heavier material.

=== 2025–present: Self-titled album ===
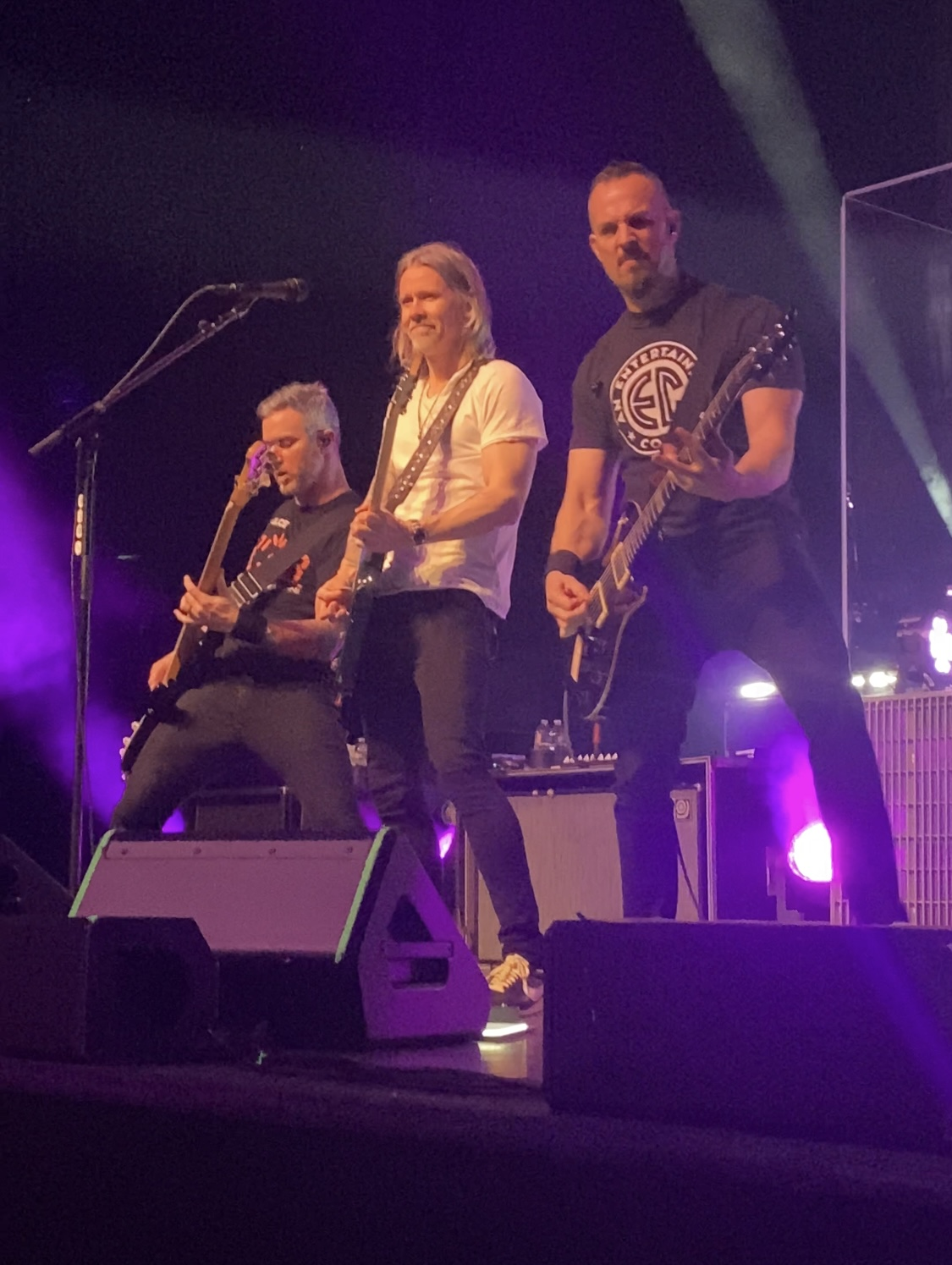
Alter Bridge in 2026 at the Wellmont Theater

On July 15, 2025, the band announced their self-titled eighth studio album, which was released on January 9, 2026. Four singles were released leading up to the album: "Silent Divide" on September 3, 2025, "What Lies Within" on October 8, 2025, "Playing Aces" on December 3, 2025, and "Scales Are Falling" on January 7, 2026. The decision to release a self‑titled album more than two decades into their career was widely interpreted as a statement of artistic identity, signaling a consolidation of the band’s core sound and themes. Early commentary from the band suggested the record blended the anthemic melodicism of Blackbird, the progressive weight of Fortress, and the modern textures introduced on Walk the Sky. According to an article from Blabbermouth.net, the album features songs that would fit well with the classic songs from their catalog. "Trust in Me" featured Mark Tremonti taking the lead during the chorus and also in "Tested and Able" and vice versa. "Hang by a Thread" also hinted at some of Alter Bridge's previous songs, and "Slave to Master" is an epic track that Alter Bridge has come to be known for. "Slave to Master" also overtakes "Fable of the Silent Son" from their previous album as the longest studio track to date in the Alter Bridge catalog with the length being nine minutes and three seconds long. In support of the album, the band embarked on a headlining tour in January 2026, featuring Sevendust and Daughtry as opening acts. Filter and Tim Montana were featured on the U.S. leg of the tour in the spring of 2026.

On June 27, 2026, the band headlined the inaugural Blackbird Festival, which they also curated, at Cardiff Castle in Cardiff, Wales, with Skindred, Mammoth, Florence Black and Cardinal Black all supporting.

== Musical style ==
Alter Bridge's music has been listed under several genres including hard rock, heavy metal, alternative metal, progressive metal, alternative rock, and post-grunge, with elements of progressive rock, thrash metal, and classic rock.

The band's music is co-written by Kennedy and Tremonti and arranged by the band; the lyrics are written primarily by Kennedy, although Tremonti wrote most of the lyrics and all of the music on One Day Remains. The lyrics on the first two Alter Bridge albums mainly touch on hope and overcoming regret, sadness, grief, loneliness, pain, and addiction. The subject matter on their third release, AB III, is darker, with lyrical themes mostly based on struggling with faith and a loss of innocence.

Often recognized for their live performances, the band generally does not perform in large venues such as arenas and amphitheaters outside of the US. Instead, they regularly play smaller venues such as House of Blues, as they intended from the start. Kennedy said, "We're definitely a live band. That's what it's all about for us. We make records so we can go out and play for people." The band has been joined on stage by several guest musicians, including Slash, Paul Reed Smith, Wolfgang Van Halen, and Eric Friedman.

== Activism ==
In early 2010, Alter Bridge joined the Wheelchair Foundation, DC3 Music Group, and other artists including Scott Stapp (vocalist of Creed), Godsmack, David Archuleta, and New Kids on the Block to assist in the "Plane to Haiti" project, a relief effort to help the victims of the 2010 Haiti earthquake. The band also joined the fight against cancer in 2011 by helping the "Play for Life" organization raise funds for City of Hope Medical Center, a leading research center for cancer.

== Awards and accolades ==
In October 2010, the band's song "Ties That Bind" from Blackbird was listed by Total Guitar as the 41st greatest guitar song of the decade, with Ultimate Guitar Archive naming AB III the seventh best album of 2010 that December. In March 2011, the dual guitar solo in the critically acclaimed song "Blackbird" was named the greatest guitar solo of all time by Guitarist, ahead of tracks by artists such as Led Zeppelin, Guns N' Roses, Van Halen, Pink Floyd, and others. Myles Kennedy responded by saying that he was "a little uncomfortable with the idea that it was voted the 'best,'" but he and Mark Tremonti both stated that they were honored. Later, in May 2011, the band defeated Avenged Sevenfold, Linkin Park, Three Days Grace, and other artists in Fuse TV's "Battle of the Fans" poll. The tournament peaked at 7.2 million votes.

Alter Bridge's first album, One Day Remains, received mixed reviews upon its initial release, with many criticizing its sound as being too similar to that of Tremonti, Marshall, and Phillips' former band, Creed. Despite this, it was certified gold by the RIAA on November 8, 2004, and remains the band's only RIAA-certified album. Since then, the band's subsequent albums have received general acclaim. The band's 2009 live album and concert film, Live from Amsterdam was also well received; it was originally released via Amazon.com, where on October 22, 2009, it rose 15,000 spots on Amazon's "Bestsellers in Music Videos & Concerts" chart in just eight hours, rising ahead of artists such as Michael Jackson and Bon Jovi to No. 1 where it remained for several weeks. This was done with no official promotion or record label support.

=== BDS Spin Awards ===
The Broadcast Data Systems, better known as BDS, is a service that tracks monitored radio, television and internet airplay of songs based on the number of spins and detections. Alter Bridge has received one BDS Spin awards.

Year	Nominee / work	Award	Result
2004	"Open Your Eyes"	50,000 Spins	Won

=== Kerrang! Awards ===
The Kerrang! Awards is an annual awards ceremony established in 1993 by Kerrang! Magazine. This ceremony celebrates the best in hard rock and heavy metal music.

Year	Nominee / work	Award	Result
2013	Alter Bridge	Best International Band	Won

=== Loudwire Music Awards ===
The Loudwire Music Awards is an annual awards ceremony presented by Loudwire Magazine. This ceremony celebrates the best in hard rock and heavy metal music. Alter Bridge has received eight awards.

Year	Nominee / work	Award	Result
2012	Myles Kennedy	Best Vocalist	Won
2013	Myles Kennedy	Best Vocalist	Won
2013	Fortress	Rock Album of the Year	Nominated
2013	Addicted to Pain	Rock Song of the Year	Nominated
2013	Mark Tremonti	Guitarist of the Year	Nominated
2013	Alter Bridge	Rock Band of the Year	Nominated
2014	Myles Kennedy	Best Vocalist	Won
2015	Myles Kennedy	Best Vocalist	Won
2015	Mark Tremonti	Best Guitarist	Won
2017	Alter Bridge	Rock Band of the Year	Won
2017	The Last Hero	Best Rock Album	Won
2017	Show Me a Leader	Best Rock Song	Won

=== Metal Storm Awards ===
Alter Bridge has received one award from three nominations.

Year	Nominee / work	Award	Result
2010	AB III	Best Hard Rock Album	Nominated
2013	Fortress	Best Hard Rock Album	Won
2016	The Last Hero	Best Hard Rock Album	Nominated

=== Revolver Golden Gods Awards ===
The Revolver Golden Gods Awards is an annual awards ceremony established in 2009 by Revolver Magazine. This ceremony celebrates the best in hard rock and heavy metal music. Alter Bridge has received one award.

Year	Nominee / work	Award	Result
2014	Mark Tremonti	Riff Lord	Won

== Band members ==
Alter Bridge performing at Rock am Ring in 2017

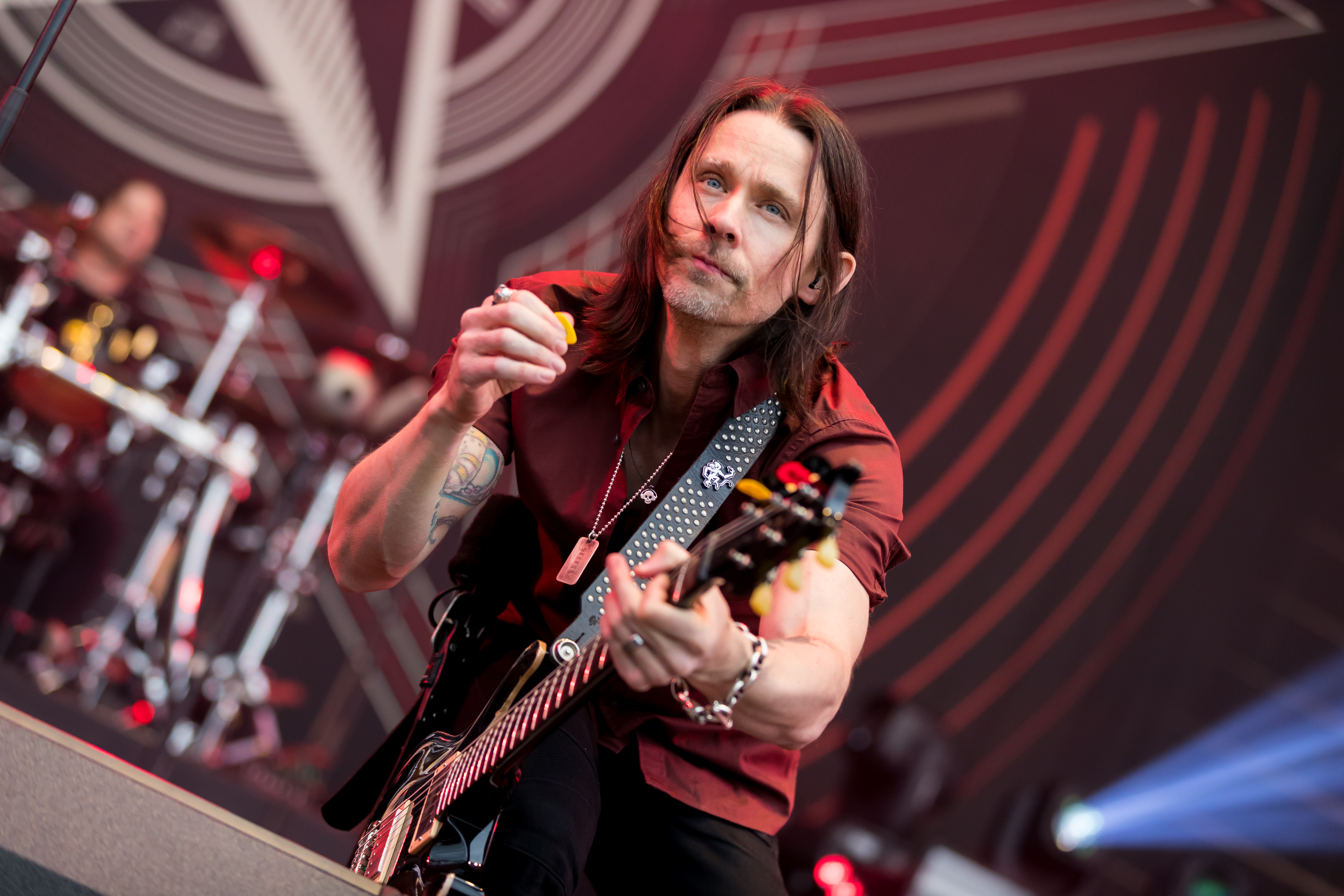
Myles Kennedy

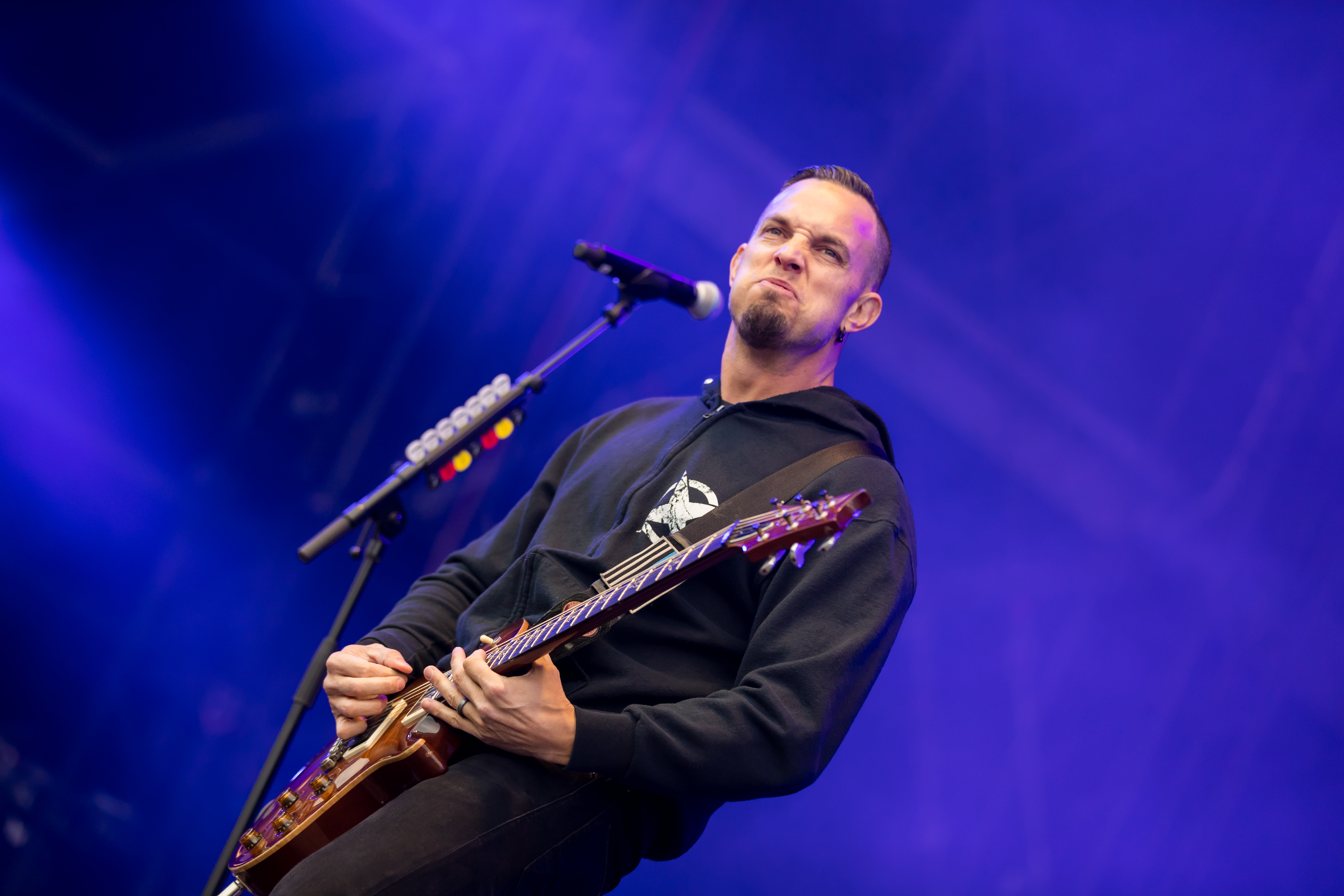
Mark Tremonti

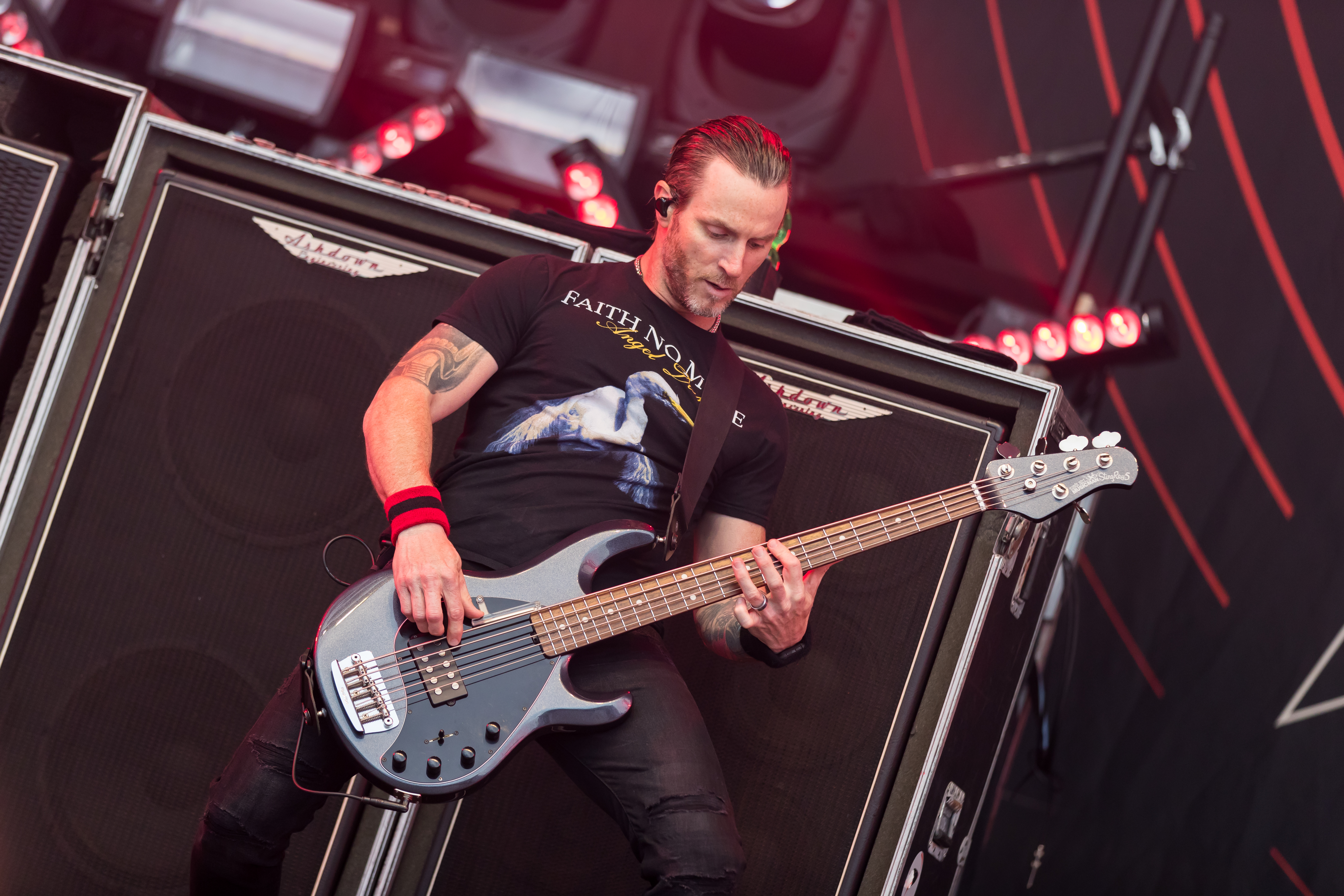
Brian Marshall

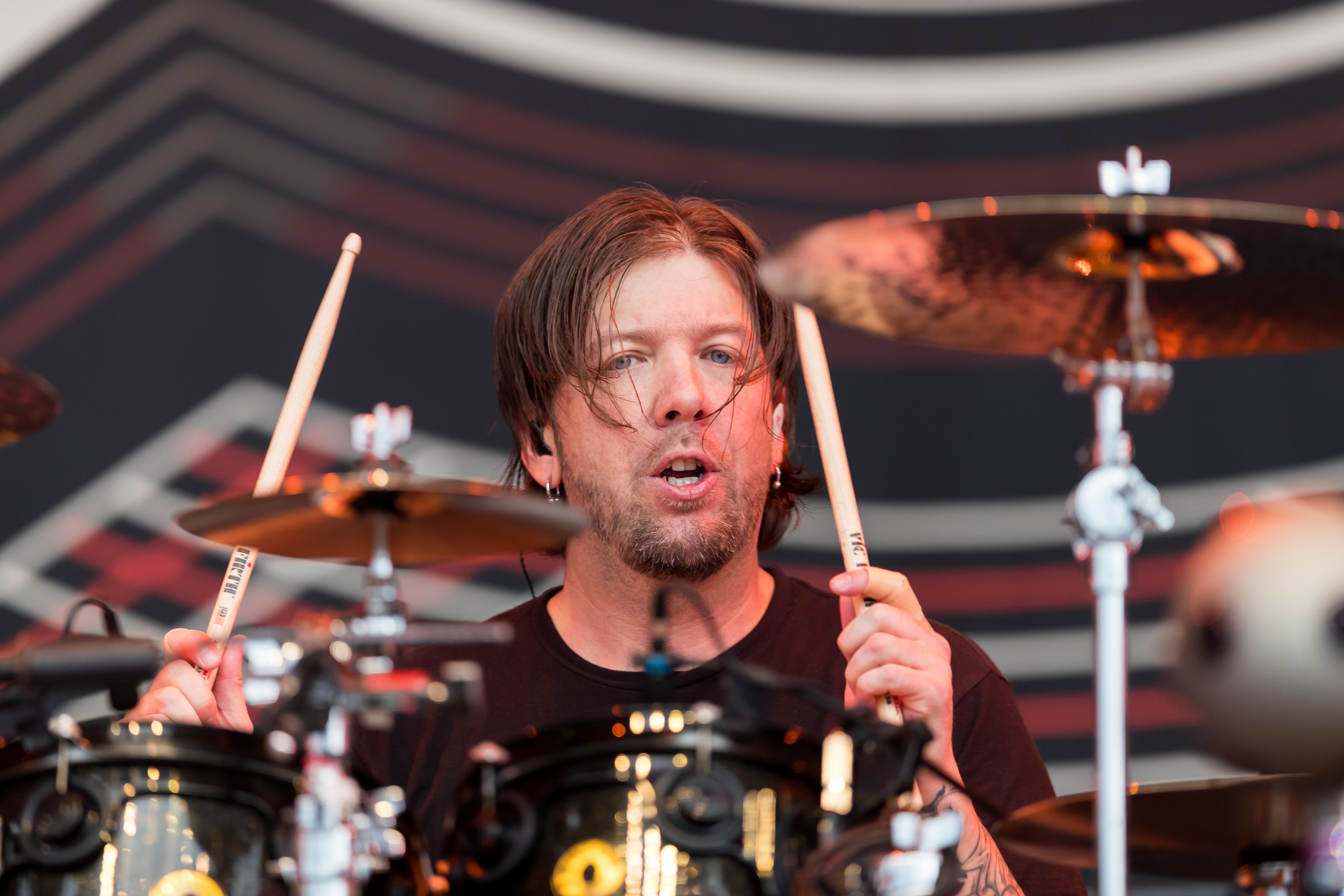
Scott Phillips
- Myles Kennedy – lead vocals, guitar
- Mark Tremonti – guitar, backing and occasional lead vocals
- Brian Marshall – bass guitar
- Scott Phillips – drums, keyboards

== Discography ==
Studio albums

- One Day Remains (2004)
- Blackbird (2007)
- AB III (2010)
- Fortress (2013)
- The Last Hero (2016)
- Walk the Sky (2019)
- Pawns & Kings (2022)
- Alter Bridge (2026)
