= Scott Phillips (musician) =

American drummer

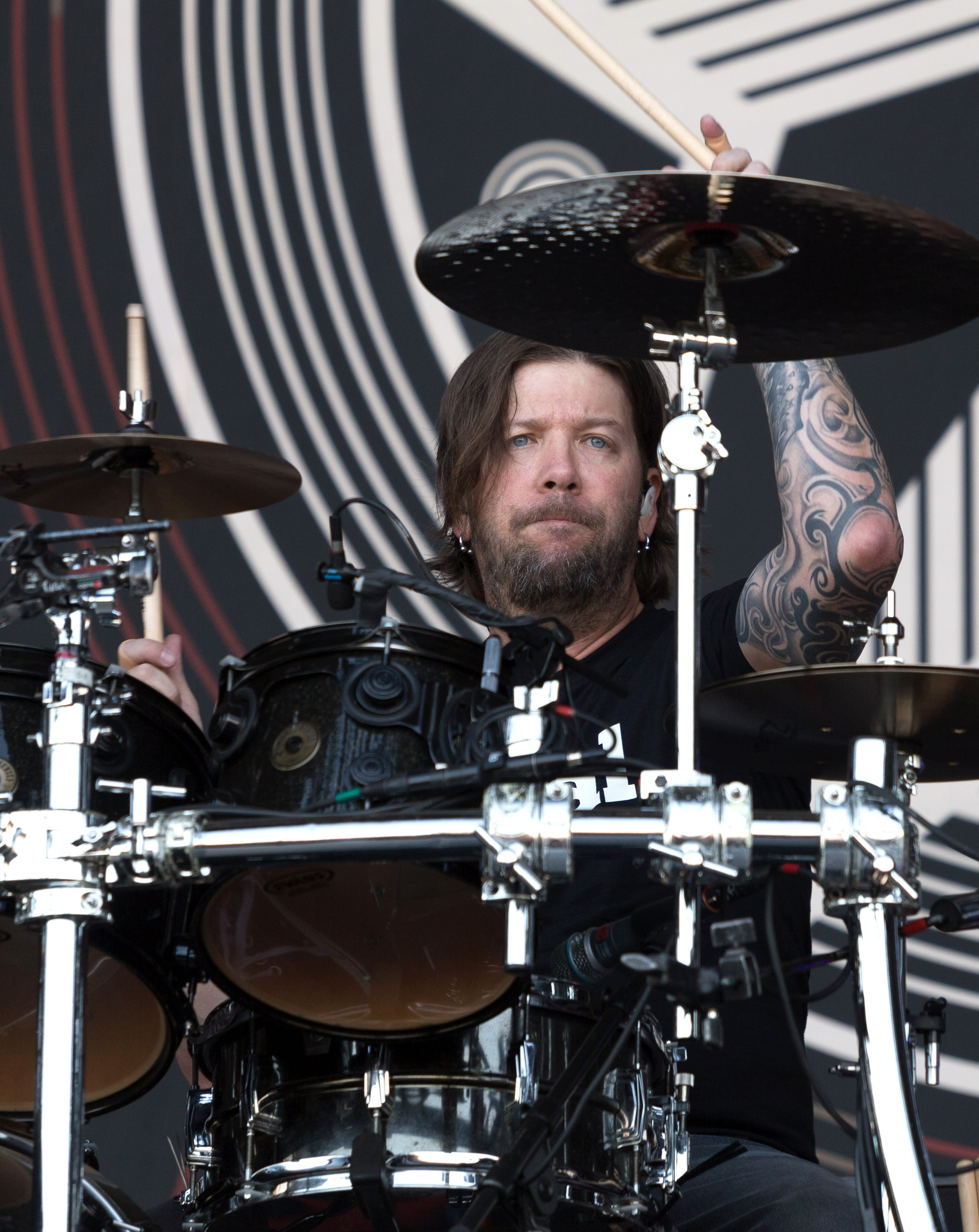
- Phillips performing with Alter Bridge in 2017

Background information
- Also known as: Flip, The Deuce
- Born: Thomas Scott Phillips; February 22, 1973 (age 53); Atlanta, Georgia, U.S.
- Genres: Post-grunge; hard rock; alternative metal; alternative rock
- Occupation: Musician
- Instruments: Drums; percussion; keyboards
- Years active: 1990–present
- Member of: Creed; Alter Bridge; Projected; Submersed

Thomas Scott "Flip" Phillips (born February 22, 1973) is an American musician. He is the drummer, percussionist, keyboardist and co-founder of the rock bands Creed, Alter Bridge, and Projected.

== Life and career ==
Phillips grew up in Madison, Florida. He started out playing in a band called Crosscut at 18. He was a founding member of the band Creed. After Creed dissolved, he joined Alter Bridge in 2004 with fellow then-former Creed members bassist Brian Marshall and lead guitarist Mark Tremonti. He is a self-taught drummer, starting at age 18, and has also played piano and saxophone. Phillips is credited with playing drums and keyboards on Creed's 2001 album Weathered, along with 1997's My Own Prison and 1999's Human Clay. In early 2012, Phillips joined the supergroup Projected with musicians from Sevendust and Submersed.

== Influences ==
Phillips cites the following drummers as his influences: Will Calhoun (Living Colour), Matt Cameron (Soundgarden/Pearl Jam), Lars Ulrich (Metallica), John Bonham (Led Zeppelin), Mike Portnoy (Dream Theater), Morgan Rose (Sevendust), and Neil Peart (Rush). His favorite bands are Living Colour, Tool, Pink Floyd, Led Zeppelin and Rush. His favorite albums are Time's Up (Living Colour), The Dark Side of the Moon and The Wall (Pink Floyd), Led Zeppelin IV (Led Zeppelin), Master of Puppets (Metallica) and Superunknown (Soundgarden).

== Equipment ==
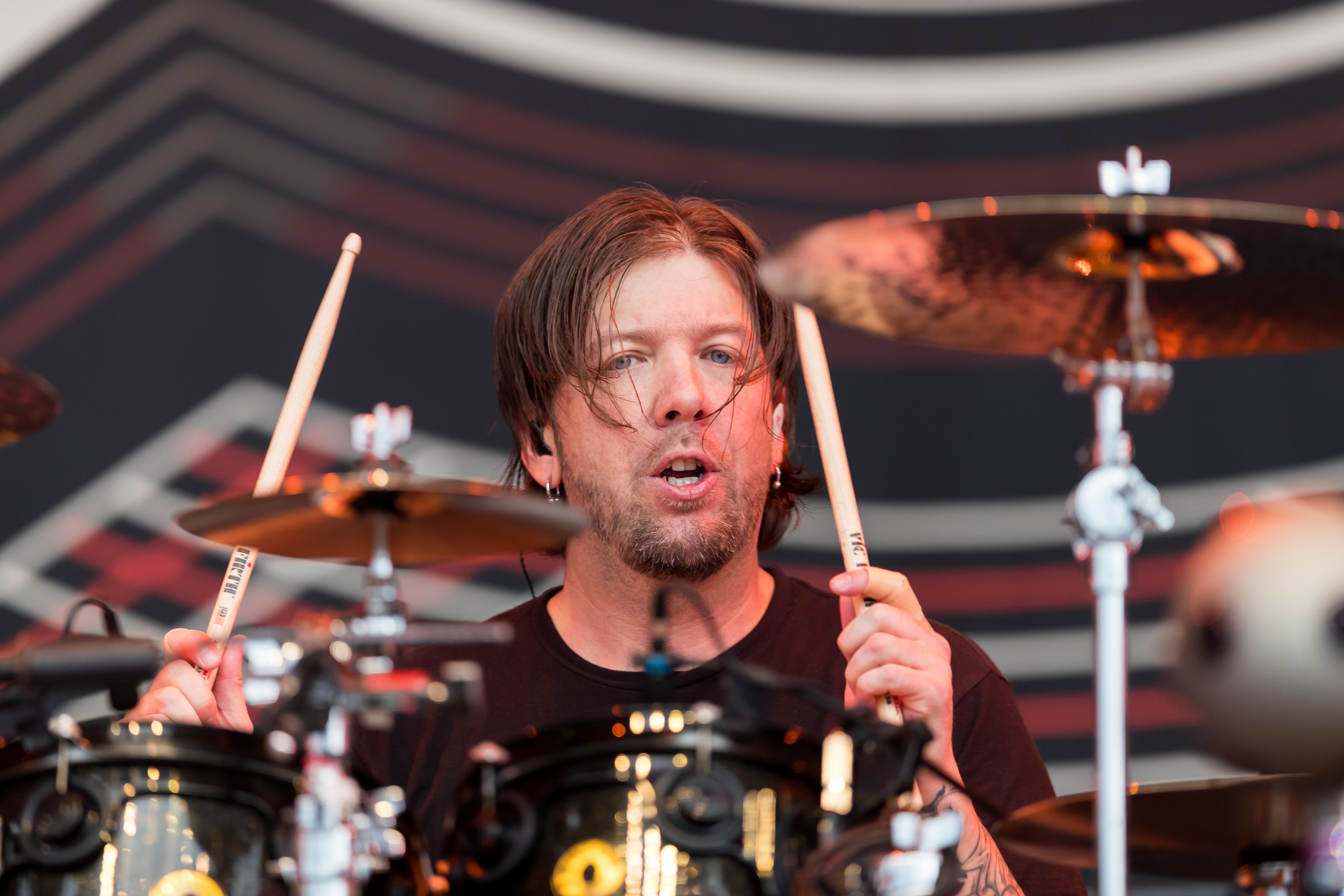
Phillips performing in 2017

Phillips has in the past used Premier Drums, but has recently been seen with DW Drums. Scott also uses Evans Drumheads, Zildjian cymbals, and Vic Firth drumsticks.

Drums: DW Drums Jazz Series

- 22x18" Bass Drum
- 10x8" Rack Tom
- 12x9" Rack Tom
- 16x16" Floor Tom
- 18x16" Floor Tom
- 14x6.5" Ludwig Black Beauty Snare Drum

Cymbals: Zildjian

- 14" A custom top w/ 14" A Quick beat bottom
- 18" Z Custom Medium Crash (x2)
- 19" Z Custom Medium Crash (x2)
- 10" A Splash
- 22" A Custom Ping Ride
- 9.5" Zil-Bel
- 20" Oriental China Trash

Drumheads: Evans

- Snare: Power Center over Hazy 300
- Toms: G2 Clear over G1 Clear
- Bass Drum: EQ3 Clear over EQ3 Black Resonant

Drumsticks:

- Vic Firth 5B - More substantial than a 5A, but not overpowering. Medium taper for a great balance. Diameter: .595" [1.51 cm], Length 16" [40.64 cm], Taper: Medium

== Discography ==
=== Creed ===
- (1997) My Own Prison
- (1999) Human Clay
- (2001) Weathered
- (2009) Full Circle
- (2009) Creed Live

=== Alter Bridge ===
- (2004) One Day Remains
- (2007) Blackbird
- (2009) Live from Amsterdam
- (2010) AB III
- (2012) Live at Wembley
- (2013) Fortress
- (2016) The Last Hero
- (2017) Live at the O2 Arena + Rarities
- (2018) Live at the Royal Albert Hall
- (2019) Walk the Sky
- (2022) Pawns & Kings
- (2026) Alter Bridge

=== Submersed ===
- (2004) In Due Time

=== Projected ===
- (2012) Human
- (2017) Ignite My Insanity
- (2022) Hypoxia
