= Brian Marshall =

American bassist

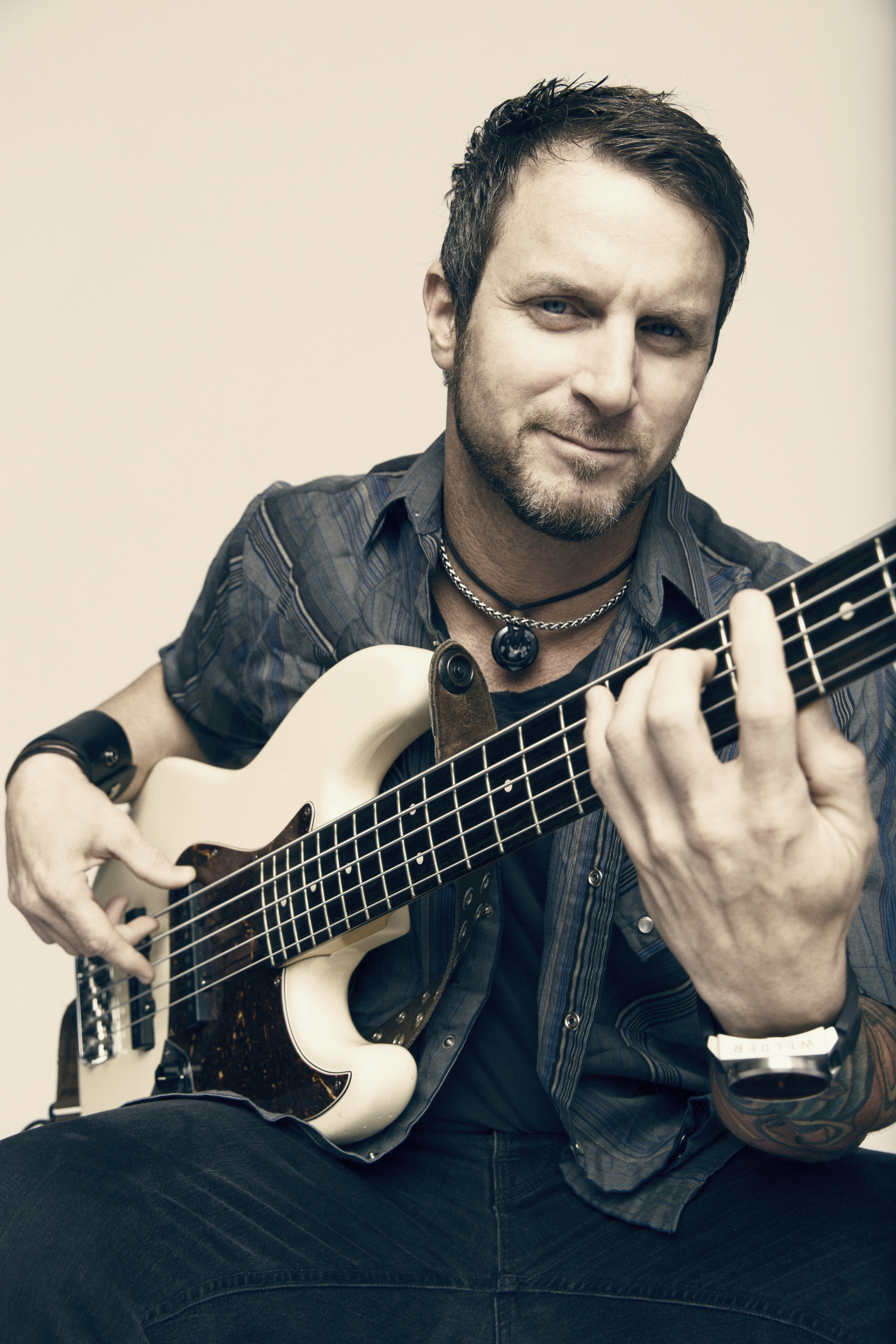
- Marshall in 2013

Background information
- Born: Brian Aubrey Marshall; April 24, 1973 (age 53); Jackson, Mississippi, U.S.
- Origin: Fort Walton Beach, Florida, U.S.
- Genres: Hard rock; post-grunge; alternative rock; alternative metal
- Occupations: Musician; songwriter
- Instrument: Bass guitar
- Years active: 1995–present
- Member of: Creed, Alter Bridge

Brian Aubrey Marshall (born April 24, 1973) is an American musician best known as the bassist and co-founder of the rock bands Creed and Alter Bridge.

== Early life ==
Brian Aubrey Marshall was born April 24, 1973, in Jackson, Mississippi, but has lived in Florida since 1979. He started out his music career by playing his father's drums. He states that after scratching his father's drum set a few times, his father decided it was time to buy him a bass guitar. He cites Steve Harris, John Entwistle, Geddy Lee, John Paul Jones and Doug Pinnick as major influences. Brian truly began his music career in the early 1990s at Florida State University in Tallahassee, Florida, where he was a member of an original band, Mattox Creed and later, a cover band called Baby Fish Mouth through which he would eventually meet his future Creed bandmates.

== Career ==
=== Creed ===
After being recruited into the band as a full-fledged member by Scott Stapp and Mark Tremonti, Marshall came up with the name Creed after a band he was in earlier called Mattox Creed which had since disbanded. He was in Creed until late 2000, when personal issues with vocalist Stapp led him to depart the band, though some sources state that Marshall was fired. Marshall, however, remains silent about this issue and does not state the reasoning behind his departure.

Brett Hestla from the band Virgos Merlot, replaced Marshall for the tour. For Creed's third album, Weathered, guitarist Mark Tremonti played bass and Brett Hestla played bass during live performances.

After months of speculation, Creed announced in April 2009 that they had reformed, and also announced that Marshall was back in the band. He appeared on Full Circle, the Creed album released in October 2009, making it the first album since Creed's sophomore release, 1999's Human Clay, to feature him on bass. The band toured in support of Full Circle throughout the United States, Canada, Europe, Australia, and South America during the summers of 2009 and 2010.

=== Alter Bridge ===
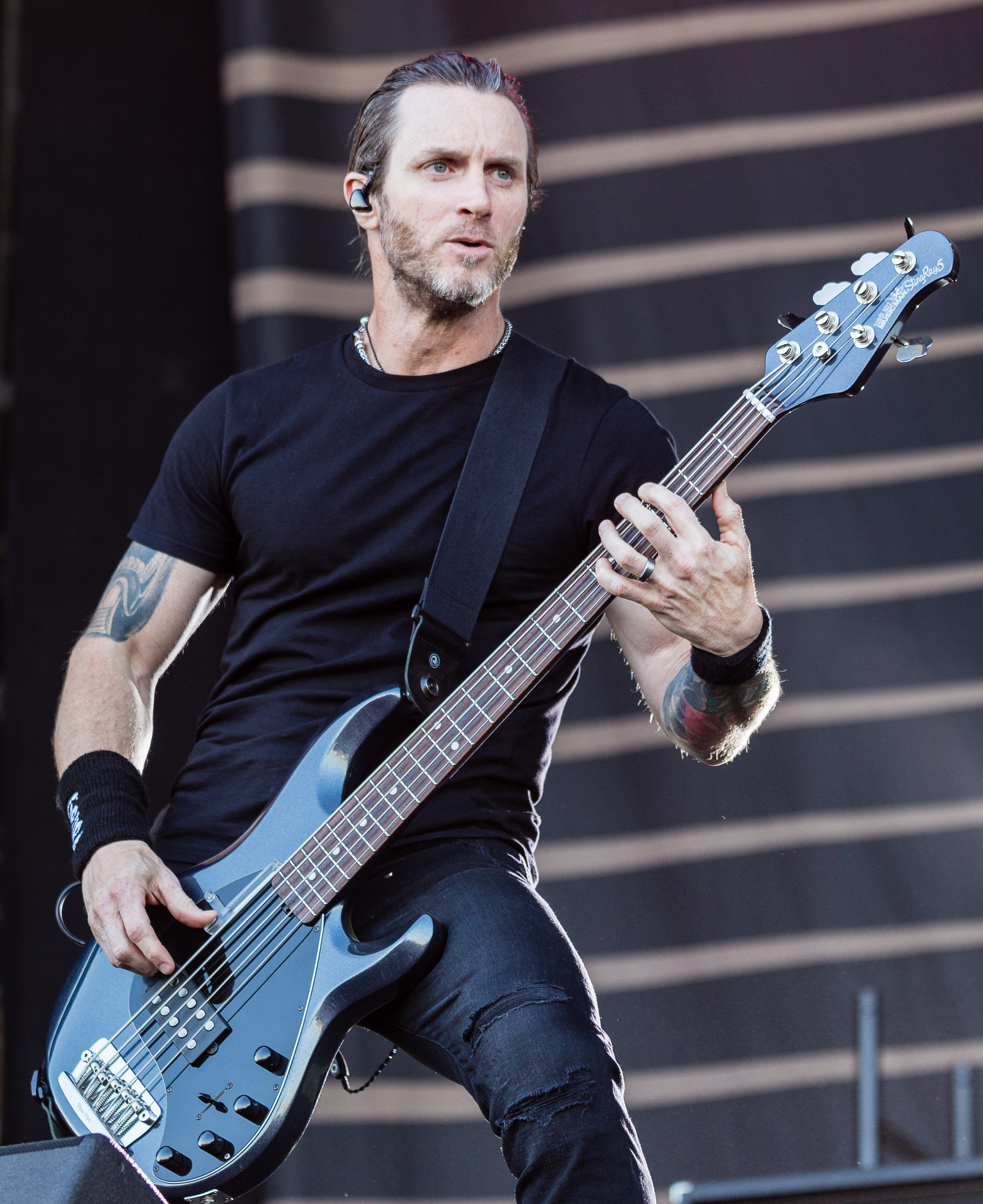
Marshall with Alter Bridge at Nova Rock 2017

When Alter Bridge started getting off the ground in late 2003, Marshall was asked by Tremonti and former Creed drummer Scott Phillips to join the band since they enjoyed his playing and company.

=== Other projects ===
After leaving Creed in 2000, Marshall stated that he had taken some time off before he later got back into music. In 2001, he began writing and recording music with a band he formed called Grand Luxx, featuring his former Mattox Creed bandmates, guitarist Dan Bartley and drummer Hardy Mattox. Singer Matt Knabe, who had previously performed in a band called Project Simon, later joined and the newly formed quartet began recording songs. Marshall stated, "I'd say our music is rock, but it's very eclectic, and I think it can reach a wide audience. We have a little bit of alternative and some hard-rocking guitar riffs too. And Matt brings in some pop flair because his influences were bands in that genre." He also stated that with Grand Luxx, he had "kind of moved to a different role" and did more work on the production side. By July 2001, the band, having played a few shows, had six songs written with initial plans to record an album that fall. Some of Grand Luxx's original songs include "Stagnant" and "Insomniac's Dream." Also during this time, Marshall was in a band called Head Heavy with vocalist Maceo Morris, Dan Bartley and James Thatcher. The band completed a full-length recording at Marshall's home studio, but it was never formally released to the public.

==== Tremonti (band) ====
In 2012, Marshall joined Mark Tremonti's solo band Tremonti, but for personal reasons, he left the project and was replaced by Wolfgang Van Halen in September 2012.

== Personal life ==
Marshall attended Choctawhatchee Senior High School (1988–1991), Tallahassee Community College (1991–1993), and Florida State University (1993–1995), where he graduated with a bachelor's degree in interior design. Aside from his musical career, he also owns and operates the Mango Moon bed and breakfast in Costa Rica.

== Discography ==
Creed

- My Own Prison (1997)
- Human Clay (1999)
- Greatest Hits (2004)
- Full Circle (2009)
- Creed Live (2009)
- With Arms Wide Open: A Retrospective (2015)
- The Best of Creed (2025)

Alter Bridge

- One Day Remains (2004)
- Blackbird (2007)
- Live from Amsterdam (2009)
- AB III (2010)
- Live at Wembley (2012)
- Fortress (2013)
- The Last Hero (2016)
- Live at the O2 Arena + Rarities (2017)
- Live at the Royal Albert Hall (2018)
- Walk the Sky (2019)
- Pawns & Kings (2022)
- Alter Bridge (2026)

Soundtracks

- Dead Man on Campus (1998)
- The Faculty (1998)
- End of Days (1999)
- Scream 3 (2000)
- The Scorpion King (2002)
