= Mark Tremonti discography =

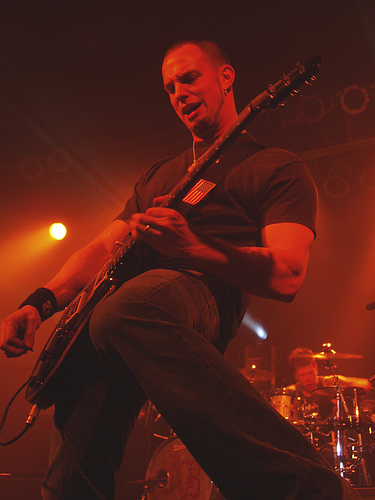
- Tremonti performing with Alter Bridge in 2007
- Studio albums: 6
- Extended plays: 1
- Compilation albums: 1
- Singles: 25
- Video albums: 3

The full discography of American rock musician Mark Tremonti consists of six studio albums, three concert films, one extended play, one compilation album, and 30 singles in total, in addition to seven studio tracks on which he has appeared as a featured artist. Born in Detroit, Michigan, on April 18, 1974, Tremonti is currently the lead guitarist of the rock bands Creed and Alter Bridge, and is also the lead vocalist and lead guitar player for his own band, Tremonti, with six albums, All I Was, Cauterize, Dust, A Dying Machine, Marching in Time, and The End Will Show Us How.

== Studio albums ==
Year	Album details	Peak chart positions							Certifications (sales thresholds)
Year	Album details	US	US Indie	US Hard Rock	AUS	GER	NZ	UK	Certifications (sales thresholds)
2012	All I Was: Released: July 17, 2012; Label: FRET12	29	7	5	—	48	—	—	
2015	Cauterize: Released: June 4, 2015; Label: FRET12	20	6	3	37	34	34	23	US: 13,075
2016	Dust: Released: April 29, 2016; Label: FRET12	34	—	—	58	31	—	16	
2018	A Dying Machine: Released: June 8, 2018; Label: Napalm	57	3	4	71	18	—	19	
2021	Marching in Time: Released: September 24, 2021; Label: Napalm	184	32	8	—	10	—	45	
2025	The End Will Show Us How: Released: January 10, 2025; Label: Napalm	—	—	—	—	21	—	—	

== Singles ==
List of singles, with selected chart positions, showing year released and album name
Year	Title	Peak chart positions	Album
Year	Title	US Main Rock	Album
2012	"You Waste Your Time"	28	All I Was
2012	"So You're Afraid"	—	All I Was
2013	"Wish You Well"	38	All I Was
2013	"All I Was"	—	All I Was
2013	"New Way Out"	—	All I Was
2014	"All That I Got"	—	Non-album single
2014	"Gone"	—	Non-album single
2015	"Another Heart"	40	Cauterize
2015	"Flying Monkeys"	—	Cauterize
2015	"Radical Change"	—	Cauterize
2015	"Providence"	—	Cauterize
2015	"Sympathy"	—	Cauterize
2016	"Dust"	40	Dust
2016	"My Last Mistake"	—	Dust
2016	"Catching Fire"	—	Dust
2016	"The Cage"	—	Dust
2016	"Unable to See"	—	Dust
2018	"A Dying Machine"	—	A Dying Machine
2018	"Take You with Me"	32	A Dying Machine
2018	"Bringer of War	—	A Dying Machine
2018	"As the Silence Becomes Me"	—	A Dying Machine
2018	"Trust"	—	A Dying Machine
2019	"Throw Them to the Lions"	—	A Dying Machine
2021	"If Not For You"	39	Marching in Time
2021	"Marching in Time"	—	Marching in Time
2021	"A World Away"	—	Marching in Time
2021	"Now and Forever"	—	Marching in Time
2022	"Bleak"	—	Marching in Time
2024	"Just Too Much"	26	The End Will Show Us How
2024	"The Mother, The Earth and I"	—	The End Will Show Us How
2024	"One More Time"	—	The End Will Show Us How
2024	"The End Will Show Us How"	—	The End Will Show Us How

== Music videos ==
List of music videos, showing year released and directors
Title	Year	Director(s)
"You Waste Your Time"	2012	Unknown
"So You're Afraid"	2012	Unknown
"Wish You Well"	2013	Chuck Brueckmann
"Take You With Me"	2018	John Deeb
"Throw Them to the Lions"	2019	Unknown
"If Not For You"	2021	Unknown
"Marching in Time"	2021	Unknown
"Just Too Much"	2024	J.T. Ibanez
"The Mother, The Earth and I"	2024	J.T. Ibanez and Kavan the Kid
"The End Will Show Us How"	2024	Unknown

== Compilation albums ==
Year	Artist	Album
2004	Creed	Greatest Hits

== Extended plays ==
Year	Artist	Album
2005	Alter Bridge	Fan EP

== Concert films ==
Year	Artist	Album
2009	Alter Bridge	Live from Amsterdam
2009	Creed	Creed Live
2012	Alter Bridge	Live at Wembley
2018	Alter Bridge featuring The Parallax Orchestra	Live at the Royal Albert Hall

== As featured artist ==
Year	Artist	Album	Track(s)
2001	Larry the Cable Guy	Lord, I Apologize	"Lord, I Apologize"
2004	Submersed	In Due Time^{[a]}	"Flicker"
2004	Michael Angelo Batio	Hands Without Shadows	"Burn"
2005	Fozzy	All That Remains	"The Way I Am"
2008	Bury Your Dead	Bury Your Dead	"Year One"
2008	Sevendust	Chapter VII: Hope & Sorrow	"Hope"
2009	Michael Angelo Batio	Hands Without Shadows 2 – Voices	"Metallica Rules"

a. Tremonti also serves as a co-producer on tracks 4–7 and 10–11 from this album.

== See also ==
- Creed discography
- Alter Bridge discography
