= FACT =

FACT or FACTS may refer to:

== Organizations ==
- FACTNet, Fight Against Coercive Tactics Network
- Falsely Accused Carers and Teachers, a British support group
- Federation Against Copyright Theft, UK
- Federation of American Consumers and Travelers, consumer group in Illinois
- Fertilisers and Chemicals Travancore, a fertilizer and chemical manufacturing company in India
- First Aid Care Team, a former emergency medical unit in the US
- Foundation for Accountability and Civic Trust
- Foundation for Advancement in Cancer Therapy
- Foundation for Art and Creative Technology, a multimedia complex in Liverpool, England
- First Atheist Church of True Science, founded by Michael Newdow
- Civic Action Front of Chad (in French: Front d'action civique du Tchad), a short-lived political coalition in Chad in the 1952 territorial election
- Front for Change and Concord in Chad, a military organisation in Chad
- Fantasy Anime Comics Toys Space (FACTS), a speculative fiction convention in Belgium
- FACT Liverpool, a new media arts center in Liverpool, England

== Science and technology ==
- FACT (biology) (facilitates chromatin transcription), a protein factor affecting eukaryotic cells
- FACT (computer language) (Fully Automated Compiling Technique), programming language that influenced COBOL
- FACT (First G-APD Cherenkov Telescope), a telescope at the Roque de los Muchachos Observatory
- Focus on Alternative and Complementary Therapies, a medical review journal

== Other uses ==
- FACT Act, Fair and Accurate Credit Transactions Act
- Fact (UK magazine), British music and culture magazine
- FACTS (magazine), a weekly magazine from Switzerland
- FACT Stadium, a multi purpose stadium in Eloor, Kerala
- Fast-Attack Craft Target, a U.S. Navy powered seaborne target
- Flexible AC transmission system, for the AC transmission of electrical energy
- Frolikha Adventure Coastline Track, long-distance trail at the northern part of Lake Baikal in Siberia
- Cape Town International Airport (ICAO airport code)
- FACT was a Japanese post-hardcore band

== See also ==
- Fact (disambiguation)
