= Fact (disambiguation) =

A fact is an occurrence in the real world.

Fact or Facts may also refer to:

== Basic uses ==
- Fact (law), a statement which is found to be true after hearing evidence
- Fact (data warehouse), a value or measurement, which represents a fact about the managed entity or system
- Fact, a verifiable and objective observation in science
- Fact, a true proposition or something that makes a proposition true in philosophy; see truthmaker

== Literature ==
- Fact (UK magazine), an online music magazine
- Fact (US magazine), a former American publication that commented on controversial topics
- Fact, a left-wing British magazine edited by Raymond Postgate
- "Facts", a poem by Lewis Carroll

== Music ==
- Fact (band), a Japanese post-hardcore band
- Fact (album), the self-titled album of Japanese post-hardcore band Fact
- "Facts" (Kanye West song)
- "Facts" (Tom MacDonald and Ben Shapiro song)
- "Facts", a song by H.E.R. from the album H.E.R.
- "Facts", a song by Lecrae from the album All Things Work Together

== See also ==
- FACT (disambiguation) (including FACTS)
