= Fortress (Alter Bridge album) =

Studio album by Alter Bridge
- Released: September 25, 2013
- Recorded: April 26 – July 2, 2013
- Studio: Studio Barbarosa (Orlando, Florida)
- Genres: Alternative metal; progressive metal; hard rock
- Length: 62:52
- Labels: Roadrunner; Warner Music
- Producer: Michael Baskette

Alter Bridge chronology
Live at Wembley (2012)	Fortress (2013)	The Last Hero (2016)

Myles Kennedy chronology
Apocalyptic Love (2012)	Fortress (2013)	World on Fire (2014)

Singles from Fortress
- 1. "Addicted to Pain" Released: August 12, 2013; 2. "Cry of Achilles" Released: April 22, 2014; 3. "Waters Rising" Released: June 2, 2014

Fortress is the fourth studio album by American rock band Alter Bridge, released by Roadrunner Records on September 25, 2013. Michael Baskette, who produced Alter Bridge's previous two albums, Blackbird (2007) and AB III (2010), returned as the producer. It was their only album since their debut, One Day Remains, not to be released in October, until their self-titled eighth album came out in January 2026. The lead single, "Addicted to Pain", was released on August 12, 2013. The album was widely acclaimed, with several critics calling it the band's best album to date and giving praise to each of the band members' musical skills displayed on the record.

== Background ==
Fortress was recorded between April 26 and July 2, 2013, at Studio Barbarosa in Orlando, Florida. The album was written over the three previous years while the band toured, as well as during Alter Bridge's hiatus due to singer Myles Kennedy touring with Slash, guitarist Mark Tremonti releasing his debut solo album All I Was, and drummer Scott Phillips recording with his band Projected. Later in the month, Tremonti announced the band had approved the cover art and had mastered the new album.

In July, in an interview with MusicRadar.com Tremonti revealed that he would sing lead vocals on one track called "The Waters Rise", which appears on the album as "Waters Rising". The official track listing and cover art for Fortress was revealed on July 31, 2013, along with the track listing, consisting of twelve songs. The artwork was designed by Dan Tremonti.

On August 4, 2013, the cover art for the lead single "Addicted to Pain" was revealed, and a day later the band confirmed that the lead single "Addicted to Pain" would be released on August 12, 2013 in Europe, and on August 20, 2013 in the US. The single was made available for streaming a few days before release. On September 5, the official video for "Addicted to Pain" was released. The official video was shot by award-winning director Dan Catullo. On September 23, the band streamed the album in its entirety for a limited time on the Metal Hammer website as a UK exclusive.

During an interview with Bravewords on October 24, Myles Kennedy stated that the Best Buy B-side track, "Outright", had been incorrectly titled. During production, the working title of the song was "Outright Two" because it featured parts of an unreleased song previously recorded by the band called "Outright" during the Blackbird recording sessions. When it went into the mastering stage, the title of the new song was never changed and was incorrectly listed on the album as "Outright". The song is actually titled "Never Say Die" and was listed with the correct title on later printings.

== Critical reception ==
Professional ratings
Aggregate scores
Source	Rating
Metacritic	81/100
Review scores
Source	Rating
AllMusic	4/5 stars
Classic Rock	8/10 stars
The Guardian	4/5 stars
International Business Times	4/5 stars
Kerrang!	5/5 stars
Loudwire	4.5/5 stars
Melodic	4/5 stars
Revolver	2.5/5 stars
Total Guitar	5/5 stars
RTÉ	4.5/5 stars

Fortress received critical acclaim upon its release. It currently holds a score of 81 out of 100 on the review aggregator Metacritic, indicating "universal acclaim". AllMusic gave the album 4 out of 5 stars, saying, "Fortress is a driving album that not only doesn't feel tired or stale, but is a monster of an album that makes a pretty solid case for being some of Alter Bridge's strongest and most dynamic work to date." In their review, International Business Times proclaimed the album "a delight to the ears". Melodic said, "[Alter Bridge's] ability is undeniable at this point, and Fortress proves they are one of the best rock/metal acts of today's generation and only moving forward." Rock Sins stated that "Alter Bridge are the hard rock band the world needs and with Fortress they have their invitation to the top table of rock music" and gave the album a 9/10 score. Kerrang! gave the album a perfect 5/5 score, saying that "on Fortress, with Myles [Kennedy] and Mark [Tremonti] both operating at the peak of their powers, there may be no limit to where Alter Bridge can go from here." Classic Rock also praised the album, ending their review with "Myles Kennedy says he never wants to be the guy who says each record is the best thing they've ever done. But in this case he should probably make an exception. Because it really is." Loudwire said of the band and album that "the substance and technicality that they have immersed into their music have elevated them to a whole new level. Fortress proves to be the next impressive chapter in an epic adventure that shows no sign of ending any time soon."

However, Revolver were not as impressed by the album, feeling that although it showed off the band's skills, the album became "predictable and monotonous".

== Commercial performance ==
The album entered at number 6 in the UK album chart, making it the band's highest-charting album in the UK to date. It entered at number 1 in the rock chart.

The album also opened at number 1 in the US, Canada, and Sweden in sales on iTunes. Fortress debuted at number 12 on the Billboard 200 and sold 30,000 copies in its first week of release. The album has sold 101,000 copies in the US as of August 2016.

== Track listing ==
All tracks are written by Alter Bridge.

No.	Title	Length
1.	"Cry of Achilles"	6:30
2.	"Addicted to Pain"	4:16
3.	"Bleed It Dry"	4:44
4.	"Lover"	5:17
5.	"The Uninvited"	4:47
6.	"Peace Is Broken"	4:40
7.	"Calm the Fire"	6:04
8.	"Waters Rising"	5:39
9.	"Farther Than the Sun"	4:07
10.	"Cry a River"	4:00
11.	"All Ends Well"	5:12
12.	"Fortress"	7:36
Total length:		62:52

Best Buy exclusive
No.	Title	Length
13.	"Never Say Die" (erroneously titled "Outright" in early pressings)	3:44
Total length:		66:36

Japanese edition
No.	Title	Length
13.	"Zero"	4:39
14.	"Home"	3:29
Total length:		74:50

== Personnel ==
Alter Bridge

- Myles Kennedy – lead vocals, guitar
- Mark Tremonti – guitar, backing vocals, lead vocals on "Waters Rising"
- Brian Marshall – bass
- Scott Phillips – drums

Production

- Michael Baskette – production, mixing, string arrangements
- Jef Moll – engineering, digital editing
- Ted Jensen – mastering
- Dan Tremonti – cover art

== Charts ==
Chart (2013)	Peak Position
Australian Albums Chart	13
Dutch Albums Chart	10
French Albums Chart	75
German Albums Chart	7
Hungarian Albums Chart	18
Irish Albums Chart	16
Italian Albums Chart	9
Japanese Albums Chart	163
NZ Albums Chart	24
Spanish Albums Chart	60
Swedish Albums Chart	17
Swedish Hard Rock Albums (Sverigetopplistan)	1
UK Albums Chart	6
UK Rock Chart	1
US Billboard 200	12

== Release history ==
Region	Release date	Label
Japan	September 25, 2013	Roadrunner
Ireland	September 27, 2013	Roadrunner
Australia	September 27, 2013	Roadrunner
Netherlands	September 27, 2013	Roadrunner
Europe	September 30, 2013	Roadrunner
United Kingdom	September 30, 2013	Roadrunner
United States	October 8, 2013	Alter Bridge/Warner Music/Capitol
Canada	October 15, 2013	Roadrunner

== Appearances ==
- The songs "Addicted to Pain" and "Cry of Achilles" were featured in the 2015 video game Guitar Hero Live.
