= Still Remains (disambiguation) =

Still Remains is a metalcore band from Grand Rapids, Michigan.

Still Remains may also refer to:

- "Still Remains", song from Stone Temple Pilots album Purple
- "Still Remains", song from Alter Bridge album AB III
