= Projected =

American rock supergroup

- Genres: Hard rock; alternative metal; post-grunge
- Years active: 2012–present
- Labels: 1119; Rat Pak
- Spinoff of: Creed; Alter Bridge; Sevendust; Submersed; Tremonti
- Members: John Connolly; Eric Friedman; Vinnie Hornsby; Scott Phillips

Projected is an American rock supergroup consisting of Sevendust members John Connolly and Vinnie Hornsby, Alter Bridge and Creed drummer Scott Phillips, and former Submersed and current Tremonti guitarist Eric Friedman. The band released their album, Human, in June 2012, before falling into inactivity as members returned to their respective bands in late 2012. The band released their second studio album, the double album, Ignite My Insanity, in July 2017. They reconvened in early 2020 and finished recording their third album in July 2020.

== History ==
The band recorded as a four-piece, with each of the members coming from different bands. John Connolly and Vinnie Hornsby had both played together for many years in the alternative metal band Sevendust, as the guitarist and bassist respectively. Eric Friedman had previously been the guitarist for the now-defunct band Submersed, currently playing with Tremonti (formed with Mark Tremonti and Garrett Whitlock), and Scott Phillips was the drummer for Creed and currently is a member in Alter Bridge. Members had other past connections as well. Creed had toured with Sevendust in the past, such as for Woodstock 99. Friedman had worked with members of Creed in the past; Phillips played drums for half the tracks on Submersed's first album, In Due Time, while Creed guitarist Mark Tremonti produced the album and played on one track. Additionally, Friedman later contributed to Tremonti's 2012 solo project, and respective album, All I Was. Projected completed work on their debut album, Human, in early June 2012, and was released on September 18, 2012. Connolly has mentioned that while he does intend to have the band play live shows and tour, he's not sure when, due to all of the member's different obligations to different bands. The band ended up returning to their respective bands and projects before any touring arose.

In April 2017, the band announced they were planning on releasing a second studio album in July 2017, later revealed to be titled Ignite My Insanity. According to Connolly, drums and main guitars recorded at Architekt Music in Butler, New Jersey with Mike Ferretti. The band spent about 10 days in the studio tracking all the main parts, then moved to Connolly's home studio 1119 in Orlando, Florida to track vocals, solos and overdubs. Also they tracked all bass while out on tour with Sevendust in Canada and the Midwest. Ignite My Insanity is a double album featuring 21 songs. The album features two songs co-written with guitarist Mark Tremonti, and one song co-written by drummer Morgan Rose. The first single, "Reload" was released on June 11, and on July 14, a second single, "Ignite", was released.

The band announced they had completed the recording of a third studio album in July 2020.

== Musical style and influences ==
Connolly has described the band's sound to something similar to the Foo Fighters and A Perfect Circle.

== Band members ==
- John Connolly – lead vocals, guitar
- Eric Friedman – guitar, backing vocals
- Vinnie Hornsby – bass guitar
- Scott Phillips – drums

== Discography ==
Studio albums

- Human (2012)
- Ignite My Insanity (2017)
- Hypoxia (2022)

Singles

Title	Year	Album
"Watch It Burn"	2012	Human
"Alive"	2012	Human
"HELLo"	2013	Human
"Bring You Back"	2014	Human
"Reload"	2017	Ignite My Insanity
"Ignite"	2017	Ignite My Insanity
"Six Feet Below"	2018	Ignite My Insanity
"Battlestations"	2018	Ignite My Insanity
"Hypoxia"	2022	Hypoxia
"Stain"	2022	Hypoxia
"The Thing That's Real"	2022	Hypoxia
"At Your Window"	2023	Hypoxia

Music videos

Title	Year
"Reload"	2017
"Ignite"	2017
"Hypoxia"	2022
"Stain"	2022
