= Michael Baskette =

American music producer

- Born: Michael Elvis Baskette
- Genres: Heavy metal; nu metal; metalcore; post-grunge; hard rock; alternative rock
- Occupations: Record producer; engineer; mixer; songwriter
- Years active: 1998–present

Michael Elvis Baskette is an American music producer who has worked with artists such as Sevendust, Alter Bridge, Projected, Tremonti, Chevelle, Limp Bizkit, Falling in Reverse, Coldrain, The Classic Crime, Temple Agents, Clint Lowery and Slash.

== Selected discography ==
Year	Artist	Album	Credit(s)
1998	Fourplay	4	assistant engineer
1999	Lit	A Place in the Sun	assistant engineer
1999	Static-X	Wisconsin Death Trip	assistant engineer
1999	Papa Vegas	Hello Vertigo	assistant engineer
1999	Stone Temple Pilots	No. 4	assistant engineer
1999	Incubus	Make Yourself	engineer
2000	The Deadlights	The Deadlights	assistant engineer
2000	Apartment 26	Hallucinating	assistant engineer
2000	Ultraspank	Progress	engineer
2000	The Union Underground	...An Education in Rebellion	second engineer
2000	Eve 6	Horrorscope	assistant programming
2001	The Mayfield Four	Second Skin	engineer
2001	40 Below Summer	Invitation to the Dance	engineer
2002	Downthesun	Downthesun	mixing
2002	Chevelle	Wonder What's Next	engineer
2002	Saliva	Back into Your System	engineer
2003	Three Days Grace	Three Days Grace	engineer
2003	Limp Bizkit	Results May Vary	engineer
2003	Puddle of Mudd	Life on Display	producer, engineer
2004	Chevelle	This Type of Thinking (Could Do Us In)	producer, engineer
2005	A Change of Pace	An Offer You Can't Refuse	producer
2005	Cold	A Different Kind of Pain	producer, keyboards, string arrangements
2005	Falling Up	Dawn Escapes	producer, mixing
2006	The Classic Crime	Albatross	producer, mixing
2006	Escape the Fate	There's No Sympathy for the Dead (EP)	producer, mixing
2006	A Change of Pace	Prepare the Masses	producer, mixing
2006	Escape the Fate	Dying Is Your Latest Fashion	producer, mixing
2006	I Am Ghost	Lovers' Requiem	producer, mixing
2007	Chevelle	Vena Sera	producer, mixing
2007	Army of Me	Citizen	producer
2007	Alter Bridge	Blackbird	producer
2008	Story of the Year	The Black Swan	producer, mixing
2008	The Classic Crime	The Silver Cord	producer, mixing
2009	Fact	Fact	producer
2009	Shadows Fall	Retribution	vocal producer
2009	Blessthefall	Witness	producer, mixing
2010	Fact	In the Blink of an Eye	producer, mixing
2010	Taking Dawn	Time to Burn	producer, mixing
2010	Story of the Year	The Constant	producer, mixing
2010	The Classic Crime	Vagabonds	producer, mixing
2010	Ratt	Infestation	producer, mixing, string arrangements
2010	Alter Bridge	AB III	producer, string arrangements
2011	There for Tomorrow	The Verge	producer
2011	Falling in Reverse	The Drug in Me Is You	producer, mixing, keyboards, programming, strings, gang vocals
2011	Blessthefall	Awakening	producer
2012	Fact	Burundanga	producer, mixing
2012	The Silver Lining	Runaway (EP)	producer
2012	Tremonti	All I Was	producer, mixing
2012	The Classic Crime	Phoenix	mixing
2012	The Amity Affliction	Chasing Ghosts	producer
2012	Projected	Human	co-producer, mixing, string arrangements
2013	Falling in Reverse	Fashionably Late	co-producer
2013	Saliva	In It to Win It	mixing
2013	Alter Bridge	Fortress	producer, mixing, strings, keyboards, programming
2014	Saliva	Rise Up	mixing
2014	Temple Agents	Find The Place	producer, mixing
2014	Slash featuring Myles Kennedy and the Conspirators	World on Fire	producer, engineer, mixing
2015	Falling in Reverse	Just Like You	producer, mixing, additional guitar, additional vocals, additional programming
2015	Tremonti	Cauterize	producer, mixing
2015	Trivium	Silence in the Snow	producer
2016	Tremonti	Dust	producer, mixing, arrangements
2016	Alter Bridge	The Last Hero	producer, mixing, strings, keyboards, programming
2017	Falling in Reverse	Coming Home	producer, mixing, additional guitars and bass
2017	The Classic Crime	How to Be Human	producer, mixing
2017	Coldrain	Fateless	producer, mixing, arrangements
2018	Temple Agents	Rise	producer, mixing
2018	Myles Kennedy	Year of the Tiger	producer, mixing, keyboards
2018	Sevendust	All I See Is War	producer, mixing
2018	Tremonti	A Dying Machine	producer, mixing, arrangements, strings, keyboards, programming
2018	Slash featuring Myles Kennedy and the Conspirators	Living the Dream	producer, mixing
2019	Shallow Side	Saints & Sinners	producer
2019	Coldrain	The Side Effects	producer, mixing
2019	Kobra and the Lotus	Evolution	producer, mixing
2019	Alter Bridge	Walk the Sky	producer, mixing, strings, keyboards, programming
2020	Clint Lowery	God Bless the Renegades	producer, mixing, programming
2020	Sevendust	Blood & Stone	producer, mixing
2021	Myles Kennedy	The Ides of March	producer, mixing, keyboards
2021	Mammoth WVH	Mammoth WVH	producer, mixing
2021	Tremonti	Marching in Time	producer, mixing, strings, programming
2022	Projected	Hypoxia	producer, mixing, programming
2022	Coldrain	Nonnegative	producer
2022	Alter Bridge	Pawns & Kings	producer, mixing, strings, keyboards, programming
2023	Sevendust	Truth Killer	producer, mixing
2023	Mammoth WVH	Mammoth II	producer, engineer, mixing
2024	Sebastian Bach	Child Within the Man	producer, mixing
2024	Myles Kennedy	The Art of Letting Go	producer, mixing
2025	Tremonti	The End Will Show Us How	producer, mixing
2025	Mammoth	The End	producer, engineer, mixing
2026	Alter Bridge	Alter Bridge	producer, engineer, mixing
