= Ignite My Insanity =

Studio album by Projected
- Released: July 21, 2017
- Recorded: 2016–2017
- Studio: Architekt Music in Butler, New Jersey, 1119 in Orlando, Florida
- Genre: Alternative metal, hard rock
- Length: 85:53
- Label: Rat Pak Records
- Producer: John Connolly; Mike Ferretti

Projected chronology
Human (2012)	Ignite My Insanity (2017)	Hypoxia (2022)

Singles from Ignite My Insanity
- 1. "Reload" Released: June 11, 2017; 2. "Ignite" Released: July 16, 2017

Professional ratings
Review scores
Source	Rating
AllThatShreds	8/10 stars
AmpsAndGreenScreens	9/10 stars
Cryptic Rock	4/5 stars
Hard Rock Hub	8/10 stars
Overdrive-Mag	8.5/10 stars

Ignite My Insanity is the second studio album by American hard rock band Projected. The album is the band's first release in five years, since the band's 2012 debut album, Human. It is a double album, featuring 21 tracks, and was released on July 21, 2017.

== Writing and recording ==
According to Connolly, drums and main guitars recorded at Architekt Music in Butler, New Jersey, with Mike Ferretti. The band spent about 10 days in the studio tracking all the main parts, then moved to Connolly's home studio 1119 in Orlando, Florida to track vocals, solos and overdubs. Also they tracked all bass while out on tour with Sevendust in Canada and the Midwest.

Ignite My Insanity is a double album featuring 21 songs. The album features two songs co-written with guitarist Mark Tremonti, and one song co-written by drummer Morgan Rose.

== Release and promotion ==
The album was officially announced in May 2017, with a prospective release window of July, later narrowed down to July 21, 2017. The first single from the album, "Reload", was released on June 11, 2017. A music video was released on the same day, primarily focused on the band performing in front of a white and red backdrop. A second single, "Ignite", was released on July 16, 2017, alongside its own respective music video, featuring the band performing interspersed with clips of Connolly attempting to reach out to a woman.

== Track listing ==
All tracks are written by Projected, expect where noted.

Disc 1
No.	Title	Writer(s)	Length
1.	"Strike"	Projected; Tom Costanza	2:54
2.	"Reload"		3:54
3.	"Six Feet Below"		4:30
4.	"Vain"		3:33
5.	"Rectify"	Projected; Mark Tremonti	3:42
6.	"Faith"		5:26
7.	"Gomorrah"		3:46
8.	"Heaven Above"		4:59
9.	"10 Years Gone"		4:27
10.	"Only"		4:33

Disc 2
No.	Title	Writer(s)	Length
1.	"Fire"		2:43
2.	"Ignite"		3:36
3.	"Call Me the Devil"	Projected; Mark Tremonti	5:06
4.	"Concede"	Projected; Morgan Rose	3:54
5.	"Inhuman"		3:54
6.	"Better"		3:46
7.	"Hate You Back"		4:37
8.	"Upside Down"		4:06
9.	"Seconds"		3:56
10.	"Inside the Sun"		4:04
11.	"Battlestations"		4:06

== Personnel ==
Band

- John Connolly – lead vocals, guitar, co-producer
- Eric Friedman – guitar, backing vocals
- Vinnie Hornsby – bass guitar
- Scott Phillips – drums

Production and design

- Mike Ferretti – recording engineer, mixing, editing, co-producer
- Shane Stanton – assistant engineer
- Andy VanDette – mastering
- Jean Michel – design
- William Burkle – photography
- Paul Mashburn – photography

== Charts ==
Chart (2017)	Peak position
US Billboard 200	181
