= You Waste Your Time =

Single by Tremonti

from the album All I Was
- Released: May 7, 2012
- Length: 3:48
- Label: FRET12
- Songwriter: Mark Tremonti
- Producer: Michael "Elvis" Baskette

Tremonti singles chronology
| "You Waste Your Time" (2012) | "So You're Afraid" (2012) |

"You Waste Your Time" is a song by Tremonti that was released by FRET12 Records as the debut single from his debut solo album All I Was on May 7, 2012. It is also the first song to be released by Creed and Alter Bridge guitarist Mark Tremonti as a solo singer-songwriter. The song received positive reviews and its live music video premiered on May 17, 2012.

== Background ==
Tremonti first announced that he would be releasing a solo album in 2010, and later announced the title of the album to be All I Was. Billboard later reported that "You Waste Your Time" would be the first single from the album, a song which had previously been released by Tremonti as a 90-second clip on Loudwire.com. FMQB reported that the song would be released to active rock radio stations in May 2012. It was released on May 7, 2012, one day after Tremonti and FRET12 Records made it available for listening on Loudwire, after which it entered the iTunes Rock Songs Chart at number 10 one day later. Tremonti and his band — consisting of rhythm guitarist Eric Friedman, bassist Brian Marshall, and drummer Garrett Whitlock — debuted their live music video of the single later that month.

== Composition ==
"You Waste Your Time" is three minutes and forty-seven seconds long, and was written by Tremonti with Eric Friedman and Garrett Whitlock. It features a speed metal influence, of which Tremonti had spoken since the beginning stages of his solo album.

== Critical reception ==
"You Waste Your Time" was well received by music critics. It received its first professional review from Mary Ouellette of Loudwire, who gave it 4 out of 5 stars and praised the song's speed metal style and melodic chorus, as well as Tremonti's vocals and guitar work. Rick Florino from Artistdirect also gave the song a positive review and a rating of 4.5 stars out of 5. He wrote: "If 'You Waste Your Time' doesn't solidify Mark Tremonti as one of heavy metal and hard rock's greatest guitarists, then the complete solo album All I Was will when it drops July 10. Otherwise, there's something horribly wrong with the world." The song has received an average of 5 out of 5 stars on the iTunes Store.

== Chart performance ==
| Chart (2012) | Peak position |
|---|---|
| US Mainstream Rock | 28 |

== Music video ==
An unofficial music video for "You Waste Your Time" was released on Noisecreep on May 17, 2012, and features Tremonti and his band performing the song live in a studio. The video uses the actual live audio from the performance.

== Track listing ==
1. "You Waste Your Time" – 3:47

== Personnel ==
Musicians

- Mark Tremonti – lead vocals, lead and rhythm guitar
- Eric Friedman – rhythm guitar, bass (studio), backing vocals
- Garrett Whitlock – drums
- Brian Marshall – bass (only on music video)

Production

- Michael "Elvis" Baskette – producer
