= Time to Burn =

Time to Burn may refer to:

- Time to Burn (Giant album), 1992
- Time to Burn (Taking Dawn album), 2010
- "Time to Burn" (The Rasmus song), a song by the Rasmus from the album Dead Letters
- "Time to Burn" (Storm song), a song by Storm, 2000
- "Time to Burn", a song by Peter Hammill from the album In a Foreign Town
- "Time to Burn", a song by Dio from the album Intermission
