= Ghost of Days Gone By =

Single by Alter Bridge

from the album AB III
- Released: April 18, 2011
- Genre: Hard rock
- Length: 4:25 (album version); 3:58 (radio edit)
- Label: Capitol
- Songwriters: Myles Kennedy; Brian Marshall; Mark Tremonti; Scott Phillips
- Producer: Michael "Elvis" Baskette

Alter Bridge singles chronology
"Wonderful Life" (2010)	"Ghost of Days Gone By" (2011)	"Addicted to Pain" (2013)

"Ghost of Days Gone By" is a song by American rock band Alter Bridge, released in the United States as the third single from their third album, AB III, on April 18, 2011. In the United States, the song was self-released via EMI, like the album. Musically, the song features a somewhat lighter tone than other songs on the album except for the much heavier and darker bridge. The song's lyrics are about mortality, reminiscing past memories, and "coming to terms with the fact that time will go on."

== Background ==
The band hinted via Facebook that "Ghost of Days Gone By" would be released as the second single in North America and the third single overall, after "Isolation" and "I Know It Hurts," the latter of which was released worldwide except for the United States. On March 7, 2011 the band wrote on Facebook "The Ghost Of Days Gone By... haunting North America this spring... It's coming!!!" It was later shown on FMQB that the song would be self-released via EMI to rock radio on April 18, 2011. The official artwork for the single was designed by guitarist Mark Tremonti's brother Dan Tremonti, who has designed all of the artwork for the band. It was revealed via Facebook on March 17, 2011. It was released to rock radio on March 28, 2011.

== Song meaning ==
Lead vocalist Myles Kennedy said that the song is "a bit of a departure from the theme of the rest of the record." He explained:

It's really about longing for the past and coming to terms with the fact that time will go on. It's kind of, at the same time, a reminder of your mortality with that, that the clock's ticking, and there's really nothing you can do to change it or stop it.

== In other media ==
- In You Think You Know Me: The Story of Edge, the song appears at the end of the documentary where it was played during a montage commemorating the career of WWE Hall of Famer Edge, who is best known for using the band's song "Metalingus" as his theme song.

== Credits and personnel ==
Alter Bridge

- Myles Kennedy – lead vocals, rhythm guitar
- Mark Tremonti – lead guitar, backing vocals
- Brian Marshall – bass
- Scott Phillips – drums

== Charts ==
=== Weekly charts ===
Chart (2011)	Peak position
Canada Rock (Billboard)	47
US Hot Rock & Alternative Songs (Billboard)	11

=== Year-end charts ===
Chart (2011)	Position
US Hot Rock & Alternative Songs (Billboard)	49
