= In the Blink of an Eye (album) =

Fact

Studio album by FACT
- Released: (Japan) January 13, 2010 (United Kingdom) May 3, 2010
- Recorded: 2009, Michael "Elvis" Baskette's Recording Studio, Bavon, Virginia
- Genres: Post-hardcore; easycore; punk rock; melodic hardcore
- Length: 33:52
- Labels: maximum10 (Japan); Hassle Records (UK)
- Producer: Michael "Elvis" Baskette

FACT chronology
Fact (2009)	Fact (2010)	burundanga (2012)

Professional ratings
Review scores
Source	Rating
AbsolutePunk	79)
Sputnikmusic	4/5 stars

In the Blink of an Eye is the second major album, their third full-length overall, by Japanese post-hardcore band FACT. The first single, "Slip of the Lip", was released on December 16, 2009, and a music video was released prior to that.

== Track listing ==
1. "In the Blink of an Eye" - 2:21
2. "This Is the End" - 2:04
3. "Slip of the Lip" - 3:03
4. "Silent Night" - 2:36
5. "Dec 2" - 3:19
6. "Part of It All" - 2:17
7. "1-3" - 1:42
8. "Behind a Smile" - 3:48
9. "Fade" - 4:12
10. "Risk of Disorder" - 2:20
11. "Goodbye to Good Morning" - 3:17
12. "Sunset" - 2:55

UK edition bonus tracks

13. "Letter to... (Ayashige/Wrench remix)"
14. "Hate Induces Hate (Dexpistols remix)"

== Personnel ==
- Hiro – Lead vocals
- Kazuki – Backing vocals and Rhythm guitars
- Eiji – Drums, percussion
- Tomohiro – Bass, Backing vocals
- Takahiro – Lead guitar, Backing vocals

== Sources ==
FACT Myspace
FACT Official Website
