= Marching in Time =

Studio album by Tremonti
- Released: September 24, 2021
- Recorded: 2020
- Studio: Studio Barbarosa, Orlando, Florida
- Genre: Alternative metal; hard rock; thrash metal
- Length: 58:46
- Label: Napalm
- Producer: Michael "Elvis" Baskette

Tremonti chronology
A Dying Machine (2018)	Marching in Time (2021)	The End Will Show Us How (2025)

Singles from Marching in Time
- 1. "If Not for You" Released: July 22, 2021; 2. "Marching in Time" Released: August 3, 2021; 3. "A World Away" Released: August 31, 2021; 4. "Now and Forever" Released: September 21, 2021

Professional ratings
Review scores
Source	Rating
Kerrang!	3/5 stars
KNAC.com	4.5/5 stars
Sonic Perspectives	(9/10)
Metal Wani	(8/10)
Classic Rock	3.5/5 stars

Marching in Time is the fifth studio album by American heavy metal band Tremonti. It was released on September 24, 2021, via Napalm Records. The record was produced by Michael "Elvis" Baskette, who produced Tremonti's previous four albums. This was also the first Tremonti album to feature Tanner Keegan on bass and Ryan Bennett on drums. The title track was released on August 3, 2021. The riff of "Now and Forever" was voted by Guitar World's readers as the best of 2021.

== Track listing ==
All tracks are written by Mark Tremonti.

No.	Title	Length
1.	"A World Away"	5:15
2.	"Now and Forever"	4:20
3.	"If Not for You"	4:10
4.	"Thrown Further"	4:47
5.	"Let That Be Us"	4:28
6.	"The Last One of Us"	4:40
7.	"In One Piece"	4:36
8.	"Under the Sun"	4:32
9.	"Not Afraid to Lose"	5:44
10.	"Bleak"	4:37
11.	"Would You Kill"	4:04
12.	"Marching in Time"	7:33
Total length:		58:46

Deluxe edition bonus tracks (vinyl only)
No.	Title	Length
13.	"Forgive Myself"	4:43
14.	"Walking Beside Me"	5:44
Total length:		68:33

== Personnel ==
Tremonti

- Mark Tremonti – lead guitar, lead vocals, arrangement
- Eric Friedman – rhythm guitar, backing vocals, arrangement, strings, keyboards, programming
- Ryan Bennett – drums
- Tanner Keegan – bass, backing vocals

Production

- Michael "Elvis" Baskette – production, mixing, strings, programming
- Josh Saldate – assistant engineering
- Jef Moll – engineer, digital editing
- Jeremy Frost – guitar technician
- Daniel Tremonti – creative direction
- Brad Blackwood – mastering

== Charts ==
Chart performance for Marching in Time
Chart (2021)	Peak position
Austrian Albums (Ö3 Austria)	21
Belgian Albums (Ultratop Wallonia)	92
German Albums (Offizielle Top 100)	10
Scottish Albums (OCC)	8
Swiss Albums (Schweizer Hitparade)	13
UK Albums (OCC)	45
UK Independent Albums (OCC)	6
UK Rock & Metal Albums (OCC)	1
US Billboard 200	184
