= The End Will Show Us How =

Studio album by Tremonti
- Released: January 10, 2025
- Recorded: 2024
- Genres: Alternative metal; hard rock
- Length: 56:30
- Label: Napalm
- Producer: Michael "Elvis" Baskette

Tremonti chronology
Marching in Time (2021)	The End Will Show Us How (2025)

Singles from The End Will Show Us How
- 1. "Just Too Much" Released: August 6, 2024; 2. "The Mother, the Earth and I" Released: September 17, 2024; 3. "One More Time" Released: October 28, 2024; 4. "The End Will Show Us How" Released: December 4, 2024

The End Will Show Us How is the sixth studio album by American heavy metal band Tremonti. It was released on January 10, 2025 through Napalm Records. The record was produced by Michael "Elvis" Baskette, who Mark Tremonti had worked with since 2007. This is the first album to be released after Mark Tremonti reunited with his previous band Creed in 2023.

== Track listing ==
All tracks are written by Mark Tremonti.

No.	Title	Length
1.	"The Mother, the Earth and I"	5:08
2.	"One More Time"	4:28
3.	"Just Too Much"	3:48
4.	"Nails"	3:55
5.	"It's Not Over"	4:54
6.	"The End Will Show Us How"	5:47
7.	"Tomorrow We Will Fail"	4:48
8.	"I'll Take My Chances"	4:00
9.	"The Bottom"	4:10
10.	"Live in Fear"	4:10
11.	"Now That I've Made It"	5:36
12.	"All the Wicked Things"	6:04
Total length:		56:30

== Personnel ==
Credits adapted from the album's liner notes and Tidal.

=== Tremonti ===
- Mark Tremonti – guitars, lead vocals
- Eric Friedman – bass, backing vocals
- Ryan Bennett – drums
- Tanner Keegan (Note: Keegan is credited as a member of the band during recording, but is not attributed to any contributions.)

=== Additional contributors ===
- Michael "Elvis" Baskette – production, mixing
- Jef Moll – engineering, digital editing
- Josh Saldate – engineering assistance
- Brad Blackwood – mastering
- Daniel Tremonti – cover art
- Alan Ashcraft – design, layout
- Chuck Brueckmann – photography

== Charts ==
Chart performance for The End Will Show Us How
Chart (2025)	Peak position
Austrian Albums (Ö3 Austria)	9
German Albums (Offizielle Top 100)	21
Scottish Albums (Official Charts)	6
Swiss Albums (Schweizer Hitparade)	9
UK Album Downloads (Official Charts)	5
UK Independent Albums (Official Charts)	4
UK Rock & Metal Albums (Official Charts)	2
