= Cauterize (album) =

Studio album by Tremonti
- Released: June 4, 2015
- Recorded: 2014–2015
- Genres: Alternative metal; thrash metal; hard rock
- Length: 44:07
- Label: FRET12
- Producer: Michael "Elvis" Baskette

Tremonti chronology
All I Was (2012)	Cauterize (2015)	Dust (2016)

Singles from Cauterize
- 1. "Another Heart" Released: March 24, 2015; 2. "Flying Monkeys" Released: May 15, 2015; 3. "Radical Change" Released: 2015; 4. "Providence" Released: November 21, 2015; 5. "Sympathy" Released: 2016

Cauterize is the second studio album by Tremonti, a band fronted by Creed and Alter Bridge guitarist Mark Tremonti. In addition to Tremonti, who provides both lead vocals and guitar, the album features rhythm guitarist and backing vocalist Eric Friedman and drummer Garrett Whitlock. It is the first Tremonti album to feature Wolfgang Van Halen, with Freidman stepping back as the band's bassist after the release of the band's first album, All I Was, in 2012, until the release of their 2018 album A Dying Machine. Cauterize was released on June 9, 2015 in the United States. The album was set to release in Australia on June 5 but saw an earlier release by a day, thus being released on June 4, 2015.

== Reception ==
Professional ratings
Review scores
Source	Rating
About.com	4/5 stars
Allmusic	(favorable)
CrypticRock	5/5 stars
HitTheFloor	4.5/5 stars
PlanetMosh	4/5 stars
Revolver	3.5/5 stars
Ultimate Guitar	8.3 stars on a 10 point scale

Cauterize was released to critical acclaim. Allmusic's James Christopher Monger did not award a star rating to the album (as with All I Was), but he was nonetheless positive in his appraisal, stating "The ten-track set is bolstered by a pair of strong singles in "Another Heart" and "Flying Monkeys," as well as some deft work from new bass player Wolfgang Van Halen." Revolver gave it 3.5 out of 5, saying of the album, "Like 2012's All I Was, Cauterize is another successful fusion of thrash metal, soaring solos and Tremonti 's powerful post-grunge vocals". About.com stated, "Tremonti is in control as a frontman, slinging out devilish riffs and passionate vocals. Cauterize is not just for fans of the guitarist or his other projects, but those that love music that is both aggressive and infectious" and gave the album 4 out of 5 stars. Ultimate Guitar gave the album 8.3/10 and said they felt like the album had a lot more sonic variety than expected, and they found themselves impressed with things they weren't even expecting from Mark Tremonti, including "the deep and introspective nature of the lyrics, some of the softer and slower passages, and the awesome vocal performance." However, they thought Wolfgang Van Halen's playing was a weak point on the album.

CrypticRock gave Cauterize a perfect 5 out of 5 score, saying "Tremonti colors his music with a message of hope and wraps it inside those hard-hitting, skin-pounding beats that take the listener from tumultuous storms to calm seas, but these contradictions in mood are intentional, crafted in a calculated and meticulous manner" and that "Tremonti strives for perfection, to make the next creative endeavor better than the previous, and each one proves to be just that."

Cauterize sold approximately 13,000 copies in its first week, debuting at #40 on the US Billboard Top 200 albums chart.

== Track listing ==
All tracks are written by Mark Tremonti.

No.	Title	Length
1.	"Radical Change"	4:24
2.	"Flying Monkeys"	4:44
3.	"Cauterize"	4:11
4.	"Arm Yourself"	3:37
5.	"Dark Trip"	4:53
6.	"Another Heart"	3:56
7.	"Fall Again"	4:47
8.	"Tie the Noose"	3:31
9.	"Sympathy"	4:19
10.	"Providence"	5:45
Total length:		44:07

== Personnel ==
Tremonti

- Mark Tremonti – lead guitar, lead vocals
- Eric Friedman – rhythm guitar, backing vocals
- Wolfgang Van Halen – bass, backing vocals
- Garrett Whitlock – drums

Production

- Michael "Elvis" Baskette – production, mixing, arrangements
- Tremonti – arrangements
- Jef Moll – engineering
- Kevin Thomas – assistant mixing
- Ted Jensen – mastering
- Stephanie Geny – assistant mastering

== Charts ==
Chart (2015)	Peak position
Australian Albums (ARIA)	34
New Zealand Albums (Recorded Music NZ)	34
UK Albums (Official Charts)	23
