= Fact (album) =

Studio album by Fact
- Released: April 14, 2009
- Recorded: 2009, Michael "Elvis" Baskette's Recording Studio Bavon, VA
- Genre: Post-hardcore; easycore; alternative metal; electronicore; metalcore; progressive rock; screamo; emo
- Length: 45:03
- Label: maximum10 (Japan); Vagrant (US); Hassle (UK)
- Producer: Michael "Elvis" Baskette

Fact chronology
Never Turn Out the Light, to Keep Myself (2009)	Fact (2009)	In the Blink of an Eye (2010)

Professional ratings
Review scores
Source	Rating
AbsolutePunk	83%
Alternative Press	1.5/5 stars
AltSounds	76%
Contactmusic.com	8/10 stars
Review Rinse Repeat	4.5/5 stars
Neo	4/5 stars

Fact is the second album by Japanese post-hardcore band FACT, and their first on a major label. It is also their first worldwide release. The only single from the album was "A Fact of Life", for which a music video was made. On the Japanese version of the album, the track "A Fact of Life (Boom Boom Satellites Remix)" does not appear.

== Track listing ==
1. "Paradox" - 2:44
2. "Los Angeles" - 2:38
3. "A Fact of Life" - 3:04
4. "Chain" - 0:24
5. "Reborn" - 3:27
6. "Purple Eyes" - 2:06
7. "Lights of Vein" - 3:14
8. "Merry Christmas, Mr. Lawrence" - 3:19
9. "CO3" - 2:03
10. "Snow" - 2:51
11. "Stretch My Arms" - 3:59
12. "45 Days" - 4:21
13. "Why..." - 3:23
14. "1-2" - 1:57
15. "Rise" - 3:33
16. "A Fact of Life (Boom Boom Satellites Remix)" - 7:09

== Personnel ==
- Hiro – Lead vocals
- Kazuki – Backing vocals and Rhythm guitar
- Eiji – Drums, percussion
- Tomohiro – Bass, Backing vocals
- Takahiro – Lead guitar, Backing vocals
