= Taking Dawn =

American heavy metal band

Taking Dawn / Devils Run
- Origin: Las Vegas, Nevada, U.S.
- Genres: Heavy metal; hard rock; power metal
- Years active: 2007–2013, 2017–present
- Label: Roadrunner Records
- Members: Chris Babbitt; Andrew Cushing; Steven Anderson; Duniel Puente
- Past members: Alan Doucette; Carlo Mazzone; Mikey Cross; Tim D'onofrio

Taking Dawn (earlier Devils Run) is an American heavy metal band from Las Vegas, Nevada.

== History ==
The band was originally named 7th Son in tribute to the iconic Iron Maiden album Seventh Son of a Seventh Son before calling themselves Taking Dawn.

The band signed to major American record label Roadrunner Records in 2009. Taking Dawn toured throughout 2010 and performed alongside Airbourne, Kiss, Slash, Trivium, All That Remains, Halestorm, DragonForce and Theory of a Deadman among others. Taking Dawn also performed at many festivals including Download in Europe and Soundwave in Australia.

In late 2010, drummer Alan Doucette left the band due to trouble on the road and was replaced by Carlo Mazzone. In 2013, guitarist Mikey Cross announced on his personal Facebook account that the band was finished and its members were all pursuing different musical ventures, however this was not acknowledged nor corroborated by the rest of the band.

Taking Dawn has since re-branded themselves under the new moniker Devils Run, and released a number of new songs including "Burn the Night Out" and "Secrets".

In 2017, the band returned to its former name Taking Dawn and released a new single "I Love Las Vegas".

== Members ==
Current members

- Chris Babbitt – lead vocals, lead guitar (2007–present)
- Andrew Cushing – bass guitar, backing vocals (2007–present)
- Steven Anderson - lead guitar, backing vocals
- Duniel Puente - drums

Former members

- Alan Doucette – drums (2007–2010)
- Carlo Mazzone - drums (2010-2011)
- Tim D'Onofrio – drums (2012–2012)
- Mikey Cross – guitar, backing vocals (2007–2013)

== Discography ==
=== Albums ===
- 2010 - Time to Burn
- 2020 - Dawn of the Demos

=== EPs ===
- 2009 - Taking Dawn Digital EP
- 2014 - ...in the Details (as Devils Run)
- 2016 - ...In the Pale Moon Light (as Devils Run)

=== Compilations ===
- 2010 - God of War: Blood & Metal - "This is Madness"

=== Singles ===
- 2017 - "The Devil Dared Me To" (as Devils Run)
- 2017 - "I Love Las Vegas"
- 2018 - "Just a Taste"
- 2019 - "The Way You Bleed"
- 2022 - "Full Throttle"

== Music videos ==
- 2009 - "Time to Burn"
- 2010 - "The Chain"
- 2021 - "Free"
