= Creed Live =

Video by Creed
- Released: December 8, 2009
- Recorded: September 25, 2009
- Venue: Cynthia Woods Mitchell Pavilion (Woodlands, Texas)
- Genre: Post-grunge; hard rock; alternative metal; alternative rock
- Length: 105 minutes
- Label: Wind-up; DC3 Music Group
- Director: Daniel E. Catullo III
- Producer: Daniel E. Catullo III; Max Pasamonte; Peter James Bowers

Creed chronology
Full Circle (2009)	Creed Live (2009)

Professional ratings
Review scores
Source	Rating
Classic Rock	4/10 stars

Creed Live is the first concert film by the American rock band Creed, recorded on September 25, 2009, in Houston and released on December 8, 2009. The performance broke the world record for the most cameras (239) used at a live music event and was available for viewing for free on Rockpit and MyContent. All of the band's hits, including the new single "Overcome", were performed. It also features usage of the "bullet time" technology, popularized by the 1999 film The Matrix. The DVD is dedicated to the United States military troops fighting overseas.

The DVD also includes a documentary film about the band's 2009 reunion and a photo gallery. A limited three-disc deluxe edition was said to be available in early 2010, but details have yet to surface, as of 2020.

== Track listing ==
All tracks are written by Mark Tremonti and Scott Stapp.

Creed Live
No.	Title	Length
1.	"Bullets"
2.	"Overcome"
3.	"My Own Prison"
4.	"Say I"
5.	"Never Die"
6.	"Torn"
7.	"A Thousand Faces"
8.	"What If"
9.	"Unforgiven"
10.	"Are You Ready?"
11.	"What's This Life For"
12.	"Faceless Man"
13.	"With Arms Wide Open"
14.	"My Sacrifice"
15.	"One"
16.	"One Last Breath"
17.	"Higher"
18.	"Overcome (Reprise)" (studio version during the credits)

=== Certifications ===
Country	Certification (sales thresholds)
Canada	Gold

== Personnel ==
Creed

- Scott Stapp – lead vocals
- Mark Tremonti – lead guitar, backing vocals
- Brian Marshall – bass
- Scott Phillips – drums

Additional musicians

- Eric Friedman – rhythm guitar, backing vocals, mandolin on "Are You Ready?"
