= Time to Burn (Taking Dawn album) =

Time To Burn

Studio album by Taking Dawn
- Released: 26 January 2010
- Recorded: 2009
- Genre: Heavy metal Hard rock Speed metal
- Length: 39:50
- Label: Roadrunner
- Producer: Michael "Elvis" Baskette

Taking Dawn chronology
Taking Dawn Digital EP (2009)	Time To Burn (2010)

Singles from Time to Burn
- 1. "Time to Burn" Released: 2009; 2. "The Chain" Released: 2010

Professional ratings
Review scores
Source	Rating
Kerrang!	3/5 stars

Time to Burn is the debut studio album by the American hard rock/heavy metal band Taking Dawn.

== Track listing ==
No.	Title	Length
1.	"Time to Burn"	2:54
2.	"Like a Revolution"	3:15
3.	"Take Me Away"	4:02
4.	"So Loud"	3:45
5.	"Save Me"	3:25
6.	"Close Your Eyes"	4:18
7.	"Godless"	3:49
8.	"Fight 'Em With Your Rock"	3:20
9.	"Never Enough"	3:54
10.	"Endlessly"	2:47
11.	"The Chain (Fleetwood Mac cover)"	4:21

Special Edition
No.	Title	Length
12.	"V"	5:10
13.	"Can't Leave You Alone"	3:30
14.	"Black Diamond (KISS cover)"	4:00

== Personnel ==
Band members

- Chris Babbitt - Vocals, Guitar
- Mikey Cross - Guitar, Backing Vocals
- Andrew Cushing - Bass, Backing Vocals
- Alan Doucette- Drums

Session musicians

- Corey Beaulieu (Trivium) - backing vocals
