= Foundation for Advancement in Cancer Therapy =

Not-for-profit organization

Foundation for Advancement in Cancer Therapy (FACT) is a non-profit 501(c)(3) educational organization.

Established in 1971, FACT supports non-toxic, biologically sound alternative cancer therapies. FACT's goal is to educate physicians and patients about a different concept of cancer and chronic degenerative conditions in the hope that the public will gain an understanding of all viable medical options.

== Brief history ==
Foundation for Advancement in Cancer Therapy was established in 1971. They are a federally approved 501(c)(3) non-profit educational organization.

Ruth Sackman, featured in the film, was co-founder and president of FACT until her death in December 2008 at age 93. She organized the foundation after watching helplessly as her daughter, Arlene, diagnosed with acute leukemia in 1970, suffered through chemotherapy, becoming progressively weaker until succumbing to the disease. Sackman felt there had to be a better way and traveled the world to find it. For the next 37 years she helped hundreds of cancer patients in the U.S. and worldwide return to healthy lives, as well as educate many more about prevention and treatment of chronic disease. Sackman's yardstick for success was always long-term recovery, i.e., at least 10 years cancer-free.

FACT's goal is to educate physicians and patients about a different concept of cancer and chronic degenerative conditions: whether dealing with breast cancer, lymphoma, Lyme disease — it is a systemic disease. Tumors or abnormal cells are symptoms of a biochemical imbalance in the body, and that imbalance can be corrected with a well-designed, individualized metabolic program. A non-toxic, biologically sound program, focusing on the whole body and not just the tumor, can provide all the materials and conditions necessary to produce healthy cells and restore well being.

The primary tools for a comprehensive, metabolic approach are 1) a balanced diet of whole, unprocessed, preferably organic foods and 2) detoxification, to efficiently relieve the body of toxins released into the bloodstream as the immune system becomes energized to do its work. Attention must also be paid to optimum function of all the body organs and glands, as well as skeletal integrity, hormonal balance, stress management.

=== Book and documentary film ===
Rethinking Cancer

The book, authored by founder Ruth Sackman, was published in 2003. The book shifts the focus of the cancer discussion from the treatment of the symptoms to correcting the cause of the health breakdown in the body as a whole. The goal is not neoplasm (tumor) reduction, as in conventional protocols such as chemotherapy and radiation. Rather, the success in the long-term recovery of the patient, i.e., returning the body to as normal a state of health as possible. Rethinking Cancer covers all the aspects of a comprehensive program that can provide the body with the factors required for restoration and maintenance of optimum health. However, this book is not intended as a self-treatment handbook. Guidance by experienced practitioners is vital, though understanding the logic of a non-toxic treatment approach is the first step.

The film of the same title is an educational documentary produced in 2009 that provides a rare look into the psychological and therapeutic journeys of five men and women who used biological therapies to overcome serious illness. In this documentary, four of the featured subjects had been diagnosed with cancer; two of these patients were considered terminal cases. The fifth patient had a severe case of Lyme disease. All five have outlived their diseases, between 15 and nearly 40 years, thus far.
