= Frolikha Adventure Coastline Track =

Coordinates: 55°21′43.2″N 109°49′8.4″E

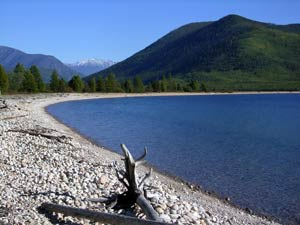
Bay of Frolikha northeast of Lake Baikal

The Frolikha Adventure Coastline Track (F.A.C.T.) is a 100 km Long-distance trail at the Northern part of Lake Baikal in Siberia (Russia). The trail was built by Russians and Germans in 2009 to encourage local tourism. The Trail should be used by experienced hikers only.
