= Mark Tremonti =

American rock musician (born 1974)

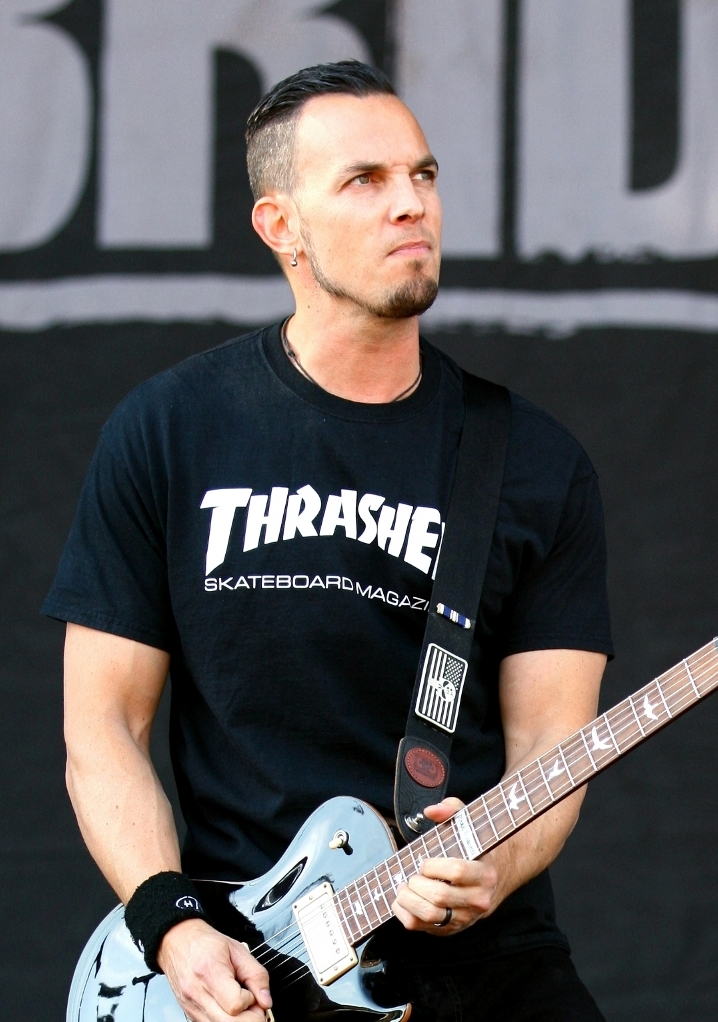
- Tremonti with Alter Bridge at the 2014 Rock im Park

Background information
- Born: Mark Thomas Tremonti; April 18, 1974 (age 52); Detroit, Michigan, U.S.
- Origin: Orlando, Florida, U.S.
- Genres: Alternative metal; post-grunge; hard rock; heavy metal; alternative rock; speed metal; thrash metal; jazz; pop jazz
- Occupations: Musician; songwriter
- Instruments: Guitar; vocals
- Works: Discography
- Years active: 1987–present
- Member of: Alter Bridge; Tremonti; Creed
- Website: marktremonti.com

Mark Thomas Tremonti (born April 18, 1974) is an American guitarist and singer, best known for his tenures with the hard rock bands Creed and Alter Bridge. He is a founding member of both bands, and has also collaborated with many other artists over the course of his career. He formed his own band Tremonti in 2011 and has released six albums with them, including 2018's A Dying Machine, which was adapted by Tremonti and science fiction novelist John Shirley.

Since his early years with Creed, Tremonti has received positive recognition as a guitarist and songwriter and has received a number of accolades, including one Grammy Award for Creed's single "With Arms Wide Open". He was also named "Guitarist of the Year" for three consecutive years by Guitar World, and in 2011 he was listed in Total Guitar magazine as the fourth-greatest heavy metal guitarist of all time.

== Early life ==
Tremonti was born on April 18, 1974, in Detroit, Michigan. He grew up in a Catholic family of Italian descent in Grosse Pointe, just outside Detroit, for most of his childhood before moving to Wilmette, Illinois. He began to become interested with music, and bought his first guitar at the age of eleven. When he was fifteen, his family moved again to Orlando, Florida, where he enrolled in Lake Highland Preparatory School. During this time, his mother was diagnosed with a life threatening illness.

After graduation, he moved to Clemson, South Carolina to attend Clemson University to major in finance. After his freshman year in college, he moved back to Florida to enroll in Florida State University, where he was reunited with his then future Creed bandmate Scott Stapp, whom Tremonti had known since high school.

Before Creed took off, he worked as a cook at Chili's.

== Career ==
=== Creed ===
Tremonti is a founding member of the American hard rock band Creed. He formed the band with lead vocalist Scott Stapp in 1994 with fellow members Brian Marshall and Scott Phillips joining as bassist and drummer, respectively. Creed is recognized by many as one of the major acts of the post-grunge movement of the late 1990s and early 2000s. Tremonti and Stapp have been collectively recognized as one of the most prolific songwriting teams in all of rock music.

The band released their debut album My Own Prison in 1997 to strong mainstream success, selling over six million copies. Four singles were released from the album: "My Own Prison", "Torn", "What's This Life For", and "One". Each song reached No. 1 on Billboard's Hot Mainstream Rock Tracks chart, making Creed the first band to achieve such a feat with a debut album. My Own Prison was followed in 1999 by Human Clay, which was an immediate success and certified diamond and eleven times platinum by the RIAA. The band released four singles from Human Clay: "Higher", "With Arms Wide Open", "What If", and "Are You Ready". "Higher" spent a record-breaking 17 weeks on the top of the rock radio charts.

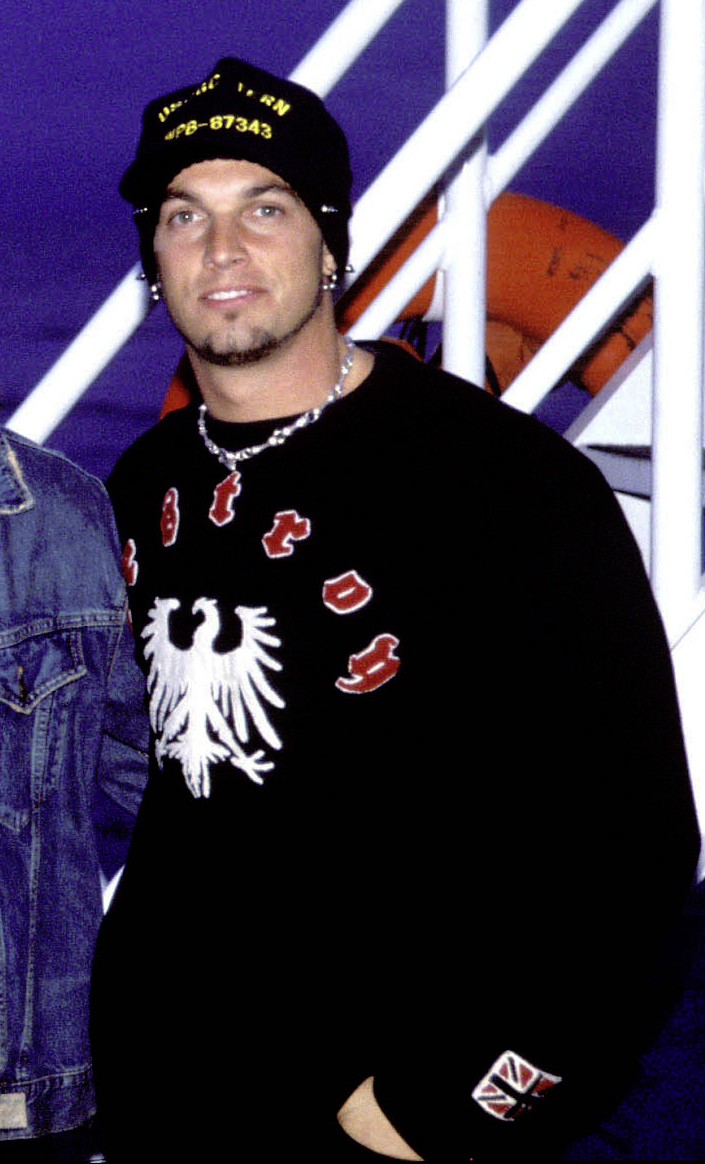
Tremonti in 2002

Marshall left the band in 2000 due to increasing tension with Stapp and to pursue other interests. He was temporarily replaced by touring bassist Brett Hestla.

Creed also won their first, and to date only, Grammy Award for Best Rock Song for "With Arms Wide Open" in 2001. That same year, after a tour, the band released another multi-platinum selling album, Weathered, from which six singles were released: "My Sacrifice", "One Last Breath", "Hide", "Don't Stop Dancing", "Weathered", and "Bullets". It would be the band's only album without Marshall on bass; Tremonti handled the bass parts himself. The tour to support this record was overwhelmingly successful but ended with a considerably controversial concert in Chicago that ultimately led to the band's breakup.

The band announced that they had disbanded in 2004, citing tension between Stapp and the other members, Tremonti in particular. The three instrumental members went on to found Alter Bridge while Stapp opted for a solo career, and Creed released their Greatest Hits in November 2004.

However, after months of speculation, despite early claims from Tremonti that Creed would never return, it was announced that Creed had reunited with plans for a tour and a new album. The record, Full Circle, was released in October 2009, accompanied by three singles, "Overcome", "Rain", and "A Thousand Faces". Though a moderate critical success, it ultimately became the band's only album to not be certified by the RIAA. Creed supported the album by touring throughout North and South America, Europe, and Australia during the summers of 2009 and 2010.

The band released a record-breaking concert film titled Creed Live in December 2009. Tremonti, Marshall, and Phillips, initially planned to alternate tours between Alter Bridge and Creed with the singers of both bands working on their own projects while the other band is active.

A fifth Creed album was expected in late 2011 or early 2012 according to Tremonti, and in early 2012 the band reconvened to tour and start work on a fifth album which never began production.

In June 2015, while promoting his second solo album Cauterize, Mark Tremonti claimed in an interview with Kerrang that he "[hasn't] been a close friend of Scott's in 9 years". He said that Stapp thought that Tremonti, Marshall and Phillips would return to Creed permanently and forget their work with Alter Bridge. The band felt this was unfair and didn't talk any further about Creed's future during the whole South American Tour in 2012. Alter Bridge kept going at the tour's conclusion.

=== Alter Bridge ===
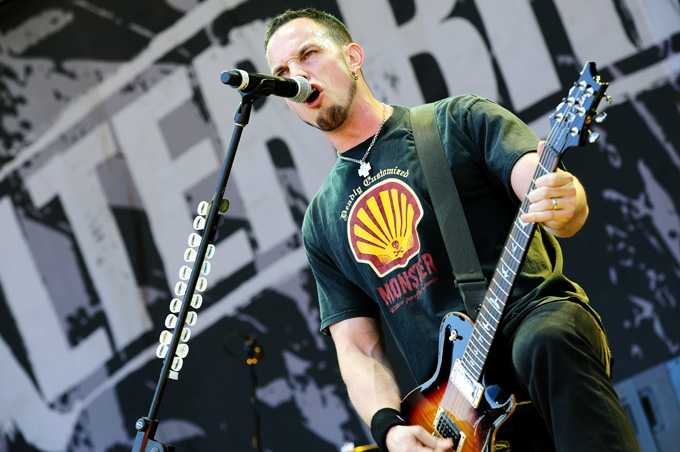
Tremonti performing with Alter Bridge in 2012

Alter Bridge was formed in January 2004 by Tremonti, Marshall, and Phillips after Creed disbanded. They asked Myles Kennedy, formerly of The Mayfield Four and the future vocalist for Slash's solo project, to be their singer.

The newly formed band released their debut album, One Day Remains, in August 2004 on Wind-up Records. It saw mostly mixed reviews, but became Alter Bridge's only RIAA-certified album, going gold. Three singles were released from One Day Remains: "Open Your Eyes", "Find the Real", and "Broken Wings".

After a tour, it was followed by a second album, Blackbird, in October 2007 on Universal Republic. Blackbird was met with largely positive reviews and released four singles: "Rise Today", "Ties That Bind", "Watch Over You", and "Before Tomorrow Comes". Its title track received strong acclaim from reviewers, and its guitar solo, which was performed by both Tremonti and Kennedy, was later named the greatest guitar solo of all time by Guitarist magazine in 2011.

Alter Bridge embarked on a successful world tour in support of Blackbird, recording their December 7, 2008, show at the Heineken Music Hall in Amsterdam for a live DVD titled Live from Amsterdam.

A single-disc version of this DVD was sold exclusively at venues during the Creed reunion tour in 2009 and on Amazon with a Blu-ray version and a deluxe DVD edition scheduled to be released later in stores. However, the distribution in stores was delayed as a result of record label issues multiple times, causing frustration amongst Alter Bridge fans and band members. It was finally released in stores in North America on January 11, 2011, after two years of delays.

Alter Bridge's third album, AB III, was released on October 11, 2010, in Europe and the UK on Roadrunner Records, and on November 9, 2010, in North America on Alter Bridge Recordings via EMI. A loose concept album, AB III has received critical acclaim, with Rick Florino from Artistdirect calling it a "sprawling masterpiece".

Its lead single, "Isolation", reached No. 1 on active rock radio and the Hot Mainstream Rock Tracks, the band's first single to do so. The band toured extensively in support of the record, with Black Stone Cherry and Like a Storm in the spring of 2011, in addition to co-headlining the second annual Carnival of Madness Tour with Theory of a Deadman. The tour continued into January 2012. Four more singles from AB III have since been released: "I Know It Hurts", "Ghost of Days Gone By", "Wonderful Life", and "Life Must Go On". The band also released a second concert film titled Live at Wembley on March 26, 2012.

The band reunited in late 2012 and recorded from April to July 2013 their fourth album, Fortress, released on September 30, 2013. The band reconvened in January 2016 to record their fifth studio album The Last Hero, which was released on October 7, 2016.

=== Tremonti ===
During the time that Creed was at the end of its career in the early 2000s, Tremonti had intentions to form a speed metal side project called Downshifter (with Hatebreed vocalist Jamey Jasta and Slipknot drummer Joey Jordison), but the project never got off the ground. Later, in 2008, Tremonti and his brother formed FRET12, an online musicians' community, production company, and record label, to release his 2008 instructional guitar documentary DVD titled Mark Tremonti: The Sound & the Story, wherein he teaches all of his guitar solos from Alter Bridge's sophomore release, Blackbird. He also teaches warm-ups, alternate tunings, finger picking style, legato techniques, and other advanced exercises.

His DVD, which is the first in The Sound & the Story series of instructional DVDs, also features guest appearances from Myles Kennedy, Michael Angelo Batio, Rusty Cooley, Bill Peck, and Troy Stetina. The aforementioned series also includes DVDs by Leslie West and Troy Stetina.

Tremonti later began expressing interest in releasing a solo album in 2010. "The bands are so different", he said of his two current main projects. "And I write so much. I'm going to do a solo record because there are some songs that I'd hate to think wouldn't see the light of day because they don't work for Creed or Alter Bridge." He plays guitar and singing lead on all of the songs himself, and former Submersed members Eric Friedman and Garrett Whitlock perform on the record as well. Tremonti described the music as "melody driven",

In a May 2011 interview, Tremonti said that it would be a "heavier-sounding" thrash metal album. He later said that the album is "probably heavier than either Creed or Alter Bridge", and that it would have "lots of soloing".

On January 20, 2012, Tremonti launched a website for his solo album where fans can sign up to receive news, previews, live streams, and giveaways. A list of working song titles was also included on the webpage, as well as the album title, All I Was. He later launched a new website for his solo work after the album's release.

It was set for a July 10, 2012 release on FRET12 Records with "You Waste Your Time" being the first single from the album, and according to FMQB, "You Waste Your Time" would be released to active rock radio stations in May 2012.

The entire song was made available for listening on May 6, 2012, one day before its release, on Loudwire.com. One day after its release, the song reached number 10 on the iTunes Rock Songs Chart, and Tremonti's live music video for it premiered on May 17, 2012, on Noisecreep. The album's official release date was announced on Ultimate Guitar Archive as July 17, 2012.

His solo band originally consisted of Friedman and Whitlock alongside Alter Bridge and Creed bassist Brian Marshall playing bass guitar as a touring member. The band performed its first solo concert at The Social in Orlando, Florida, on July 17, 2012, with the performance filmed for a future video release. Wolfgang Van Halen replaced Brian Marshall as a touring bassist in September 2012.

Tremonti recorded their second album with Wolfgang Van Halen playing bass for the 2015 release. On March 3, 2015, Tremonti released a sample of the song "Radical Change" whilst revealing the album title Cauterize and the track listing for the upcoming sophomore effort. On March 17, 2015, Tremonti released another song preview for the track "Flying Monkeys" and also gave a concrete release date of June 9, 2015, for Cauterize. On March 20, 2015, Tremonti unveiled via Twitter that the first single, titled "Another Heart", was released March 24, 2015.

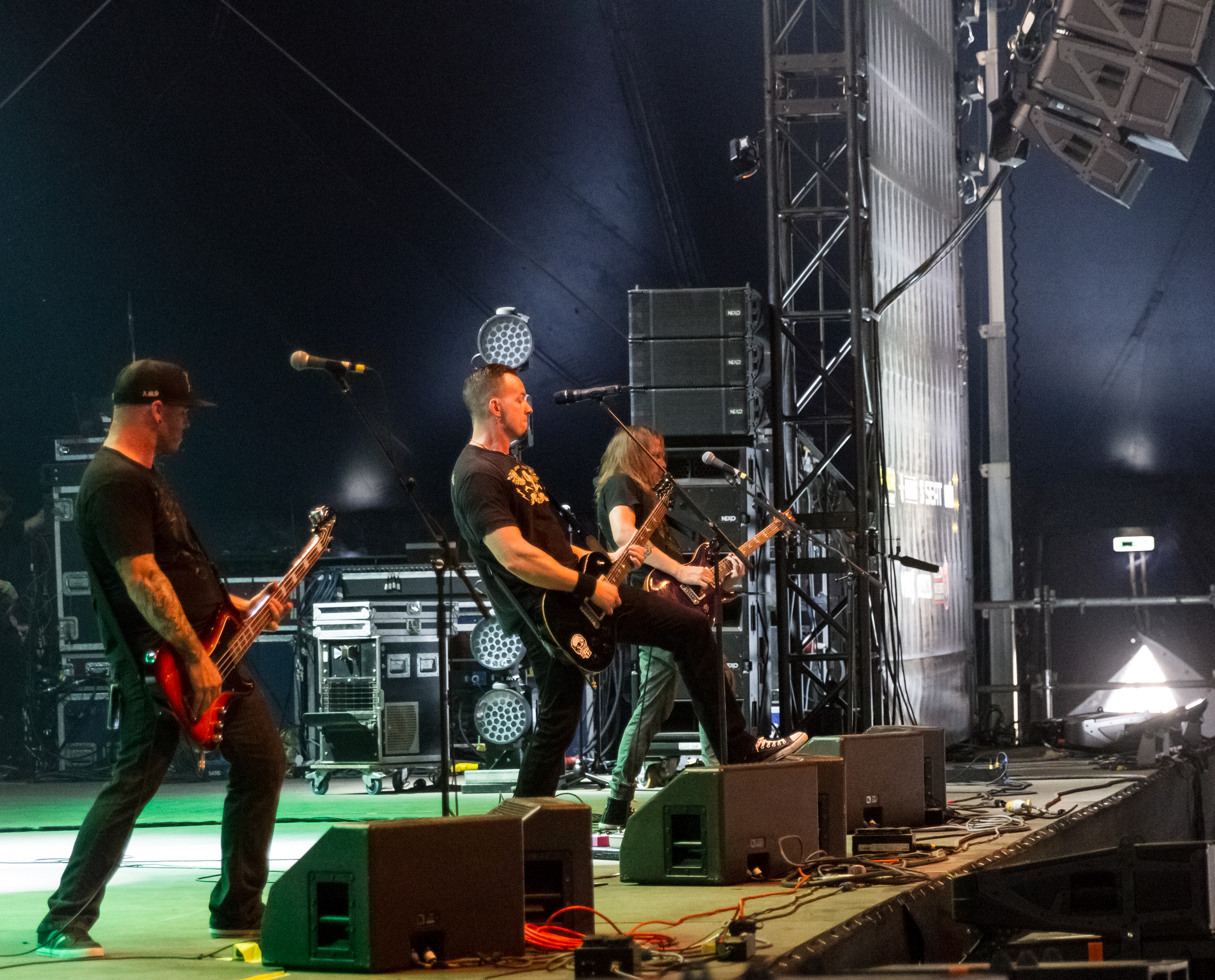
Tremonti with his band at Rock am Ring 2015

On March 23, 2015, the single Another Heart was made available for streaming via fret12. On March 27, 2015, the artwork for Cauterize was revealed and it was revealed that Cauterize was the first of two albums to be released as the two albums were recorded together. "The second album titled Dust will be released in early 2016, "after [they] record the Alter Bridge record and [they] have that three or four month gap, [he]'ll be looking to tour on it to support it." Tremonti said he "wanted to make sure both albums flowed dynamically. If there were two slow moody songs, [he]'d put one on each album, same thing if there were two really heavy aggressive songs, [he] would split them up evenly. There's isn't a specific theme to one or the other. Each record is mixed" and that "it's definitely not the 'b-sides' of this album." Dust was released on April 29, 2016, via FRET12 records, and produced by Michael Baskette who produced Tremonti's past two records and has also produced most of Alter Bridge's records.

Tremonti's fourth solo album, the concept album A Dying Machine, was released on June 8, 2018, via Napalm Records. The record was once again produced by Michael Baskette. The album is accompanied by a full-length novel under the same name written by Mark Tremonti and John Shirley, tying together loose ends of the album's plot. Tremonti supported Iron Maiden on the European leg of their Legacy of the Beast Tour in June 2018.

=== Other works ===
Tremonti has worked with several artists since his beginning years with Creed. In 2001 he collaborated with comedian Larry the Cable Guy on his comedy album Lord, I Apologize, on which Tremonti is credited as a performer and songwriter. Tremonti later recalled, "We had become friends a long time ago, before his career really started to take off. We joked about getting together and doing a song, and he called me up one day to say he actually wanted to do it. So he sang me his idea, and I went to record my guitar lines that day, and the record went gold."

Tremonti later began performing in the neo-classical metal genre with guitarist Michael Angelo Batio, whose 2004 album Hands Without Shadows featured Tremonti as a guest musician on the Deep Purple cover "Burn". He said that he is "really good friends" with Batio, and that working with him was "an honor". Batio later appeared on Tremonti's guitar instructional DVD The Sound & the Story as a guest tutor. In 2009 he appeared on Batio's next album, Hands Without Shadows 2 – Voices, performing a solo on the Metallica medley "Metallica Rules".

In 2004, Tremonti co-produced, with Don Gilmore and Kirk Kelsey, some songs on In Due Time by Submersed, whom Tremonti helped get signed to Wind-up Records. Former Submersed guitarist Eric Friedman recalled his experiences with Tremonti in the studio, saying that watching him "taught us a lot as far as music and songwriting and being able to get across the things we want to get across."

Tremonti said that producing is not "something I'd do any time soon again." He later continued working with other artists on the musical side, in 2005 with Fozzy on their album All That Remains, performing a guitar solo on the song "The Way I Am". His Alter Bridge bandmate Myles Kennedy also appeared on the album.

In 2008 Tremonti made two guest appearances, one with the metalcore band Bury Your Dead on their self-titled album, and another with Sevendust on the song "Hope" from Chapter VII: Hope & Sorrow, which also featured appearances from Myles Kennedy and Chris Daughtry.

In March 2022, Tremonti announced that he would be releasing a covers album of Frank Sinatra songs that were recorded with former members of Sinatra's band. The album, titled Tremonti Sings Sinatra was released on May 27, 2022, with proceeds going to the National Down Syndrome Society. Mark would go on to announce the release of a Christmas album titled Christmas Classics Old & New, which was released on October 27, 2023.

== Work with other artists ==
Tremonti, who gained some playing tips from Troy Stetina, has also collaborated with him. One occasion was the guitar clinic which was held at the Conservatorium van Amsterdam in November 2010. Stetina was a major feature in the third installment of The Sound And The Story dvd by Fret12 Productions which ran for three hours. Besides Tremonti, it featured, Michael Angelo Batio, Eric Friedman and Bill Peck. Tremonti is featured on the track "Burn" from Stetina's band's album Beyond the Infinite. In an October, 2004 article about Tremonti with interview, Tremonti talked about how he would give Stetina producing ideas and in return Stetina would go over classical pieces with him. Sometimes Stetina's going over theory stuff and getting to the third or fourth topic would be overwhelming with Temonti telling him to stop so he could take it all in first. He referred to him as a theory genius. He also said that the last time he was with him, he wrote a couple of the solo's for Stetina's record.

== Equipment ==
At the age of 11, Tremonti received his first guitar, a Gibson Les Paul copy, having been inspired to play by songs like Deep Purple's "Smoke on the Water", the J. Geils Band's "Love Stinks", and Boston's "More Than a Feeling". A double-cutaway Tokai followed as Tremonti became more committed to improving as a player, but Tremonti wanted a real Les Paul and was given one—a Les Paul Studio Lite model—by his father. At this point, Tremonti and his family had moved from suburban Detroit to Orlando, and lacking friends as the new kid in town, he spent most of his free time playing and recording with a 4-track. Tremonti's first amp cost him $50 and sounded "terrible." He replaced it with a Crate G1500 half-stack. Tremonti considers the Hughes & Kettner Attax 100 his first "decent" amp.

When Creed recorded their debut, My Own Prison, Tremonti used a red 1986 Gibson Les Paul with a Kahler bridge. The guitar—along with all of the band's gear—was stolen before a concert in Boston in 1997, but his manager Tim Tournier later recovered the Les Paul and gifted it to Tremonti in 2024 on Tremonti's 50th birthday. In Creed's early years, Tremonti extensively played a 1959 reissue Gibson Les Paul. Amps he has used professionally include the Mesa/Boogie Triple Rectifier, Bogner Uberschall and Shiva, and Diezel Hagan. After playing a Dumble owned by Paul Reed Smith, Tremonti became "beyond obsessed" with them and spent a year trying to find one that suited him. He has since acquired several of them. For live shows, he uses Bludotone amps in place of his Dumbles. Tremonti also has a signature amp from Two-Rock, another brand that makes Dumble-style amps. Tremonti noted that he relies on amps like his Mesa/Boogies and Bogners for heavier rhythm work and boutique amplifiers like his Dumbles for lead playing.

=== Collaborations with PRS ===
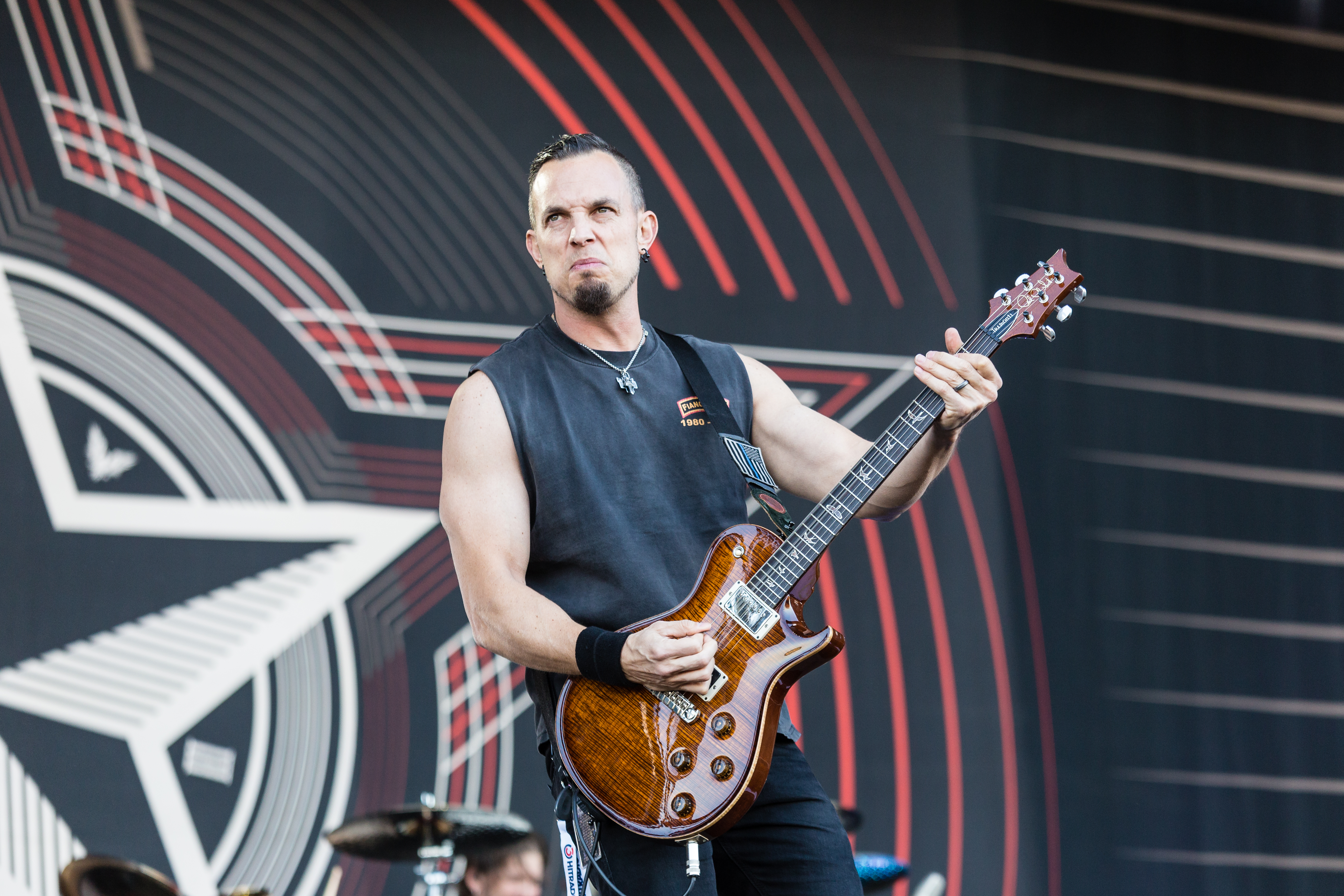
Tremonti with one of his PRS signature guitars.

Tremonti was a long-time admirer of PRS Guitars but could not afford one as a younger player. While touring in support of My Own Prison, PRS contacted him to offer him one of their guitars and received a McCarty model, which he used exclusively for a time. Tremonti however wished for several changes to suit his style and sound, including more aggressive-sounding pickups and a different neck profile. Such alterations led to Tremonti's first signature model with PRS, released in 2001. The brand later released a limited edition 20th anniversary of the model to celebrate what Guitar World called "one of the most successful partnerships in modern electric guitar history." Around 2016, Tremonti co-designed a new model with PRS, this time with a body reminiscent of the Gibson Explorer, but it was not put into production due to its "quirky" design and complex construction.

Tremonti also has a line of signature amplifiers with PRS, the "MT" series. PRS released the compact, two-channel MT15 head and matching 1x12 cabinet in 2018. The 100-watt, three-channel MT100 head followed in 2024. The amps' clean channels are based on the Fender Twin, while the higher-gain lead channels are designed for metal. The overdrive channel added for the MT100 is designed to be Dumble-esque. This voicing was added as a selectable option on the MT15's lead channel in a 2025 update to the amp.

== Personal life ==
On December 14, 2002, Tremonti married Victoria Rodriguez, with whom he has two sons, Austen and Pearson, and a daughter, Stella. They currently reside in Windermere, Florida. Tremonti's daughter Stella has Down syndrome, and he supports Down syndrome charities.

One of Tremonti's brothers, Michael, is Alter Bridge's fan liaison and publicist. Another brother, Dan, has created the artwork for all of the albums by both Alter Bridge and Creed and is the president and creative director of a design/marketing company called Core Twelve. Tremonti's mother died in January 2002 and Alter Bridge's song "In Loving Memory" is a tribute to her.

== Awards and accolades ==
=== RIAA certifications ===
These statistics were compiled from the RIAA certification online database.

Studio albums

- My Own Prison: 6× platinum (August 2002)
- Human Clay: 11× platinum, 1×(+) diamond (January 2004)
- Weathered: 6× platinum (January 2003)
- One Day Remains: gold (November 2004)

Compilations

- Greatest Hits: 2× platinum (November 2008)

=== Grammy Awards and nominations ===
The Grammy Awards are awarded annually by the National Academy of Recording Arts and Sciences. With Creed, Mark Tremonti has been nominated for three Grammy Awards resulting in one win.

- "With Arms Wide Open" – Best Rock Performance by a Duo or Group with Vocal, 2001 (nomination)
- "With Arms Wide Open" – Best Rock Song, 2001 (winner)
- "My Sacrifice" – Best Rock Performance by a Duo or Group with Vocal, 2003 (nomination)

=== Other accolades ===
Loudwire Music Awards

Year	Nominee / work	Award	Result
2013	Mark Tremonti	Best Guitarist	Nominated
2015	Mark Tremonti	Best Guitarist	Won

Metal Hammer Golden Gods Awards

Year	Nominee / work	Award	Result
2008	Mark Tremonti	Best Shredder	Nominated
2014	Mark Tremonti	Riff Lord	Won

Tremonti was also named "Guitarist of the Year" for three consecutive years by Guitar World magazine, and in 2011 he was listed as the fourth greatest heavy metal guitarist of all time by Total Guitar. In addition, and also in 2011, the guitar solo in the Alter Bridge song "Blackbird", which Tremonti performed with Myles Kennedy, was named the greatest guitar solo of all time by Guitarist magazine. In December 2019, he was named Guitarist of the Decade by Guitar World and was featured in its covers along with Tosin Abasi, Gary Clark Jr. and Nita Strauss who captured the next three positions respectively.

== Discography ==
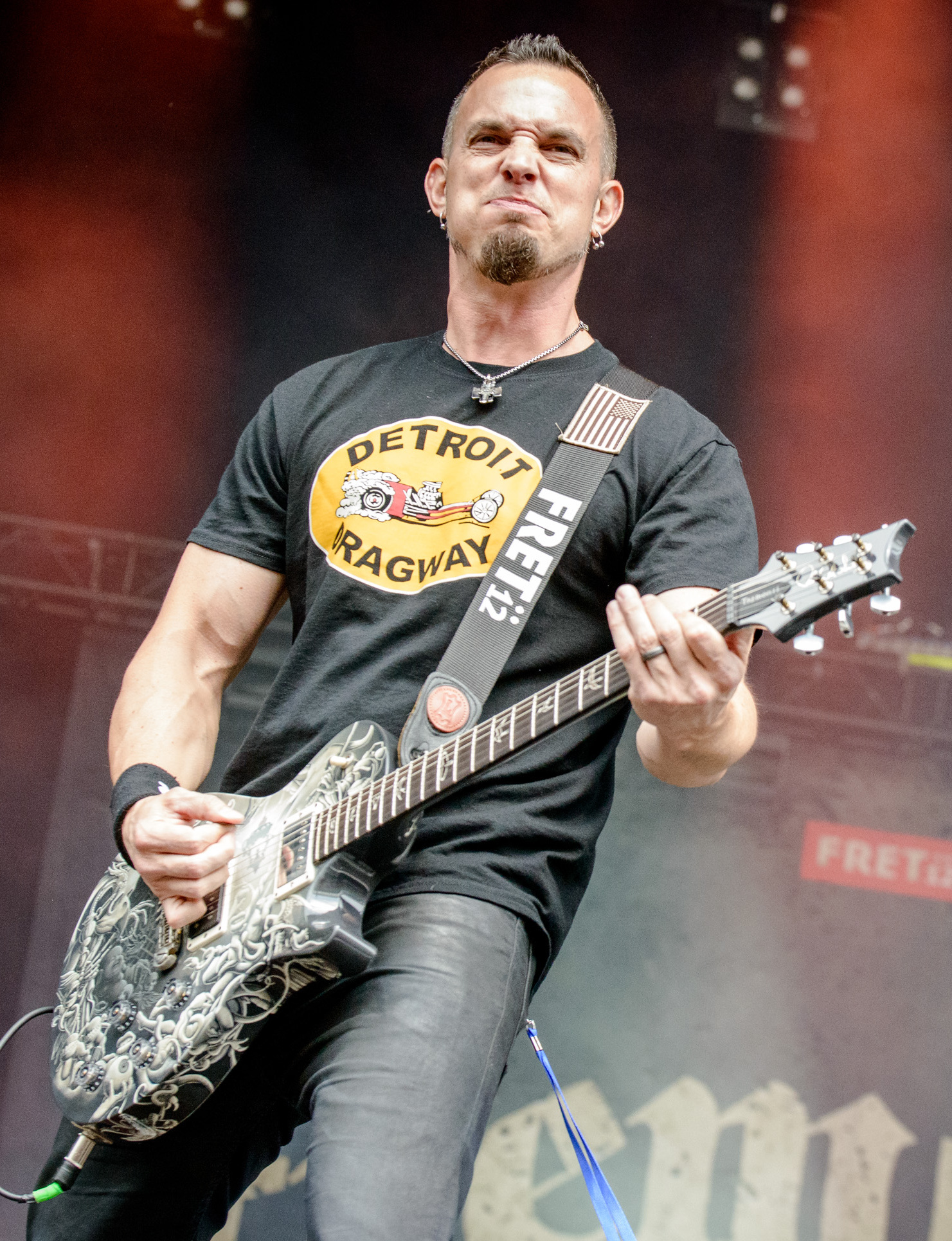
Tremonti in 2016

=== Creed ===
Studio albums

- My Own Prison (1997)
- Human Clay (1999)
- Weathered (2001)
- Full Circle (2009)

=== Alter Bridge ===
Studio albums

- One Day Remains (2004)
- Blackbird (2007)
- AB III (2010)
- Fortress (2013)
- The Last Hero (2016)
- Walk the Sky (2019)
- Pawns & Kings (2022)
- Alter Bridge (2026)

=== Tremonti ===
Studio albums

- All I Was (2012)
- Cauterize (2015)
- Dust (2016)
- A Dying Machine (2018)
- Marching in Time (2021)
- The End Will Show Us How (2025)

=== Solo ===
Studio albums

- Mark Tremonti Sings Frank Sinatra (2022)

Holiday albums

- Mark Tremonti Christmas Classics New & Old (2023)

== Filmography ==
- Behind the Music: Creed (2000)
- Mark Tremonti: The Sound & the Story (2008)
- Alter Bridge: Fortress: The Sound & the Story (2014)
- OSW Review: Episode 84 - Survivor Series 93 (2019)
