= Dust (Tremonti album) =

Studio album by Tremonti
- Released: April 29, 2016
- Recorded: 2014–2015
- Studios: Studio Barbarosa, Orlando, Florida
- Genres: Alternative metal; hard rock; thrash metal
- Length: 43:24
- Label: FRET12
- Producer: Michael "Elvis" Baskette

Tremonti chronology
Cauterize (2015)	Dust (2016)	A Dying Machine (2018)

Singles from Dust
- 1. "Dust" Released: April 18, 2016

Dust is the third studio album by heavy metal band Tremonti. It was released on April 29, 2016, via FRET12 Records. Dust was recorded during the same time that Cauterize was being recorded. The record was produced by Michael "Elvis" Baskette, who produced Tremonti's past two records and also produced Alter Bridge's records.

== Track listing ==
All tracks are written by Mark Tremonti.

No.	Title	Length
1.	"My Last Mistake"	4:30
2.	"The Cage"	3:35
3.	"Once Dead"	3:06
4.	"Dust"	5:22
5.	"Betray Me"	4:05
6.	"Tore My Heart Out"	5:08
7.	"Catching Fire"	4:41
8.	"Never Wrong"	4:42
9.	"Rising Storm"	3:18
10.	"Unable to See"	4:57
Total length:		43:24

Professional ratings
Review scores
Source	Rating
AntiHero Magazine	4/5 stars
Cryptic Rock	4.5/5 stars
Ultimate Guitar	9/10 stars

== Personnel ==
Tremonti

- Mark Tremonti – lead vocals, lead guitar
- Eric Friedman – rhythm guitar, backing vocals
- Wolfgang Van Halen – bass, backing vocals
- Garrett Whitlock – drums

Production

- Michael "Elvis" Baskette – production, mixing, arrangements
- Tremonti – arrangements
- Jef Moll – engineering
- Kevin Thomas – assistant mixing
- Ted Jensen – mastering
- Stephanie Geny – assistant mastering

== Charts ==
Chart (2016)	Peak position
Australian Albums (ARIA)	58
Austrian Albums (Ö3 Austria)	33
Belgian Albums (Ultratop Flanders)	51
Belgian Albums (Ultratop Wallonia)	109
Dutch Albums (Album Top 100)	27
Italian Albums (FIMI)	62
Scottish Albums (Official Charts)	6
Swiss Albums (Schweizer Hitparade)	28
UK Albums (Official Charts)	16
UK Album Downloads (Official Charts)	13
UK Independent Albums (Official Charts)	2
UK Rock & Metal Albums (Official Charts)	2
US Billboard 200	34
