= A Dying Machine =

Studio album by Tremonti
- Released: June 8, 2018
- Recorded: 2017–2018
- Studios: Studio Barbarosa, Orlando, Florida
- Genres: Alternative metal; hard rock; thrash metal
- Length: 61:28
- Label: Napalm
- Producer: Michael "Elvis" Baskette

Tremonti chronology
Dust (2016)	A Dying Machine (2018)	Marching in Time (2021)

Singles from A Dying Machine
- 1. "A Dying Machine" Released: April 6, 2018; 2. "Take You with Me" Released: April 16, 2018; 3. "Bringer of War" Released: May 11, 2018; 4. "As the Silence Becomes Me" Released: June 1, 2018; 5. "Trust" Released: September 28, 2018

A Dying Machine is the fourth studio album and first concept album by American heavy metal band Tremonti. It was released on June 8, 2018, via Napalm Records. The record was produced by Michael "Elvis" Baskette, who produced Tremonti's past three records and also produced Alter Bridge's records. The album also features Eric Friedman playing bass once again since Wolfgang Van Halen departed the band. The album is accompanied by a full-length novel under the same name written by Mark Tremonti and John Shirley, tying together loose ends of the album's plot. Frontman Mark Tremonti stated that the album is the most dynamic and diverse in his entire catalog. The album's first radio single, "Take You with Me", was released April 16, 2018. The single peaked at number 32 on the US Billboard Mainstream Rock Songs chart in June 2018.

== Track listing ==
All tracks are written by Tremonti.

No.	Title	Length
1.	"Bringer of War"	4:53
2.	"From the Sky"	3:42
3.	"A Dying Machine"	6:19
4.	"Trust"	4:39
5.	"Throw Them to the Lions"	3:20
6.	"Make It Hurt"	4:12
7.	"Traipse"	4:23
8.	"The First the Last"	4:41
9.	"A Lot Like Sin"	4:32
10.	"The Day When Legions Burned"	3:09
11.	"As the Silence Becomes Me"	5:17
12.	"Take You with Me"	4:20
13.	"Desolation"	4:29
14.	"Found" (instrumental)	3:57
Total length:		61:28

Deluxe edition bonus tracks
No.	Title	Length
15.	"Now or Never"	3:47
16.	"Desolation" (acoustic)	4:25
Total length:		70:06

Professional ratings
Review scores
Source	Rating
Cryptic Rock	4.5/5 stars
Loudwire	Positive

== Personnel ==
Tremonti

- Mark Tremonti – lead guitar, lead vocals
- Eric Friedman – rhythm guitar, bass, backing vocals, keyboards, programming
- Garrett Whitlock – drums

Additional musicians

- Michael "Elvis" Baskette – keyboards, programming
- Jef Moll – keyboards, programming

Production

- Michael "Elvis" Baskette – production, mixing, arrangements, strings
- Mark Tremonti – arrangements
- Josh Saldate – assistant engineering
- Jef Moll – engineering, digital editing, arrangements, strings
- Jeremy Frost – guitar technician
- Daniel Tremonti – creative direction
- Ted Jensen – mastering
- Adam Grover – assistant mastering

== Charts ==
Chart (2018)	Peak position
Australian Albums (ARIA)	71
Austrian Albums (Ö3 Austria)	14
Belgian Albums (Ultratop Flanders)	51
Belgian Albums (Ultratop Wallonia)	103
Dutch Albums (Album Top 100)	50
German Albums (Offizielle Top 100)	18
Hungarian Albums (MAHASZ)	31
New Zealand Heatseeker Albums (RMNZ)	6
Scottish Albums (Official Charts)	9
Swiss Albums (Schweizer Hitparade)	3
UK Albums (Official Charts)	19
UK Independent Albums (Official Charts)	4
UK Rock & Metal Albums (Official Charts)	1
US Billboard 200	57
US Independent Albums (Billboard)	3
US Top Hard Rock Albums (Billboard)	4
US Top Rock Albums (Billboard)	7
