= AB III =

Studio album by Alter Bridge
- Released: October 8, 2010
- Recorded: December 2009 – April 2010
- Studios: The Hit Factory/Criteria Studios (Miami, Florida); Paint It Black Studio (Orlando, Florida); Studio Barbarosa (Bavon, Virginia)
- Genres: Alternative metal; progressive metal; hard rock
- Length: 65:39
- Labels: Roadrunner; EMI
- Producer: Michael Baskette

Alter Bridge chronology
Blackbird (2007)	AB III (2010)	Live at Wembley (2012)

Myles Kennedy chronology
Live in Manchester (2010)	AB III (2010)	Made in Stoke 24/7/11 (2011)

Singles from AB III
- 1. "Isolation" Released: September 26, 2010; 2. "I Know It Hurts" Released: January 21, 2011 (AU); 3. "Ghost of Days Gone By" Released: April 18, 2011 (US); 4. "Wonderful Life" Released: June 5, 2011 (UK); 5. "Life Must Go On" Released: November 28, 2011

Special edition cover
- AB III.5

AB III is the third studio album by American rock band Alter Bridge, released on October 8, 2010. Produced by Michael Baskette, the album is a departure from the band's first two albums; lyrically, it is a loose concept album dealing with darker lyrical themes of struggling with faith, while musically, the album's sound is more dynamic and progressive than previous recordings. AB III is also the first Alter Bridge album to be released on Roadrunner Records, making it the band's third consecutive album to be released on a different label. The album was released on Roadrunner Records worldwide except North America, where it was self-released on Alter Bridge Recordings via Capitol Records.

The first single off the album, "Isolation", is the band's most successful single to date and was released on September 26, 2010, in the United Kingdom and November 9, 2010, in the United States. AB III received acclaim from music critics; for example, Artistdirect called it a "masterpiece". The album was certified Silver by the British Phonographic Industry, the same certification as Alter Bridge's 2007 album Blackbird.

== Background ==
AB III was written throughout 2008 and 2009, but the songs were arranged generally quickly. Regarding the arrangement and recording process of the album, lead singer Myles Kennedy said that the creation of AB III was different from that of the band's previous album, Blackbird, because the band had about six weeks to put the music together before they started to work with their producer, Michael Baskette. Kennedy said, "I think it actually worked out well, because it's a very spontaneous record."

On June 21, 2010, the band announced that the recording, mixing, and mastering of the album was finished and all that was left was to decide on was the official title, song titles, track listing, and album art. On August 9, 2010, the band announced that the working title of the album, AB III, would actually be the official title after all, stating they think it is "simple yet effective". On the same blog post, they announced each song on the record one by one throughout the day. Later that month it was confirmed that AB III would be released worldwide (excluding North America) on Roadrunner Records, making AB III Alter Bridge's third consecutive album to be released through a different record label. The same press release confirmed a European release date of October 11, 2010 for the new album. On October 6, the band announced that the album is scheduled for a North American release on November 9, 2010, on their own label, Alter Bridge Recordings, a subsidiary of Capitol Records. AB III was first released in Australia three years to the day after their previous album on October 8, 2010.

"Zero" and "Home" were included on the United States version of the album as bonus tracks. The Japanese version contains a bonus track called "Never Born to Follow". Guitarist Mark Tremonti said that AB III could be the band's final studio album and that future Alter Bridge releases may be released digitally or in the form of EPs.

On October 25, 2011, the band released a special edition of the album titled AB III.5, which included the three bonus tracks plus an hour-long documentary titled One by One.

== Composition and lyrical content ==
AB III, initially described by the band as being very dark, heavy, and dynamic, is lyrically a very dark record and a radical departure from the band's first two albums, One Day Remains (2004) and Blackbird (2007), in terms of subject matter. It is a loose concept album, a first for Alter Bridge, about a character "desperately struggling to find their place in a world steeped in doubt and emptiness", whereas the other two Alter Bridge records primarily focus on themes of "hope and perseverance in the face of adversity". Kennedy has said that the album "touches on the thoughts and emotions of someone who has come to question everything that was once regarded as an absolute truth" and that it is about "the realization that everything you once believed in might not exist". However, on AB III, there are songs that touch on other emotions as well such as "Wonderful Life", a song that Kennedy claims was "an extremely emotional song to put together, it took a long time". He then adds, "The lyric was inspired by the idea that there will come a day when we all must say goodbye to the ones we love and hold dear in our hearts. Basically, I asked myself what would I want to say in that final moment, that last goodbye?".

The record is also much more intricate, progressive, and dynamic than their first two albums. It has even been described as progressive metal in some reviews.

Kennedy plays more lead guitar on this album than he does on Blackbird. He said that "[he's] definitely doing things [he hasn't] done in a long time as a guitar player." Tremonti's vocals are also more prominent compared to the band's previous releases, singing co-lead vocals with Kennedy on "Words Darker Than Their Wings", the title of which is derived from a phrase in George R. R. Martin's novel A Game of Thrones.

== Reception and chart performance ==
Professional ratings
Review scores
Source	Rating
411Mania	8.0/10
Allmusic	3.5/5 stars
Artistdirect	5/5 stars
Hard Rock Hideout	8/10 stars
Kerrang!	3/5 stars
Reflections of Darkness	9/10
Rock Sound	7/10
Total Guitar	[#207, p.27]
Type 3 Media	6/10 stars

AB III has received acclaim. Rob Laing from MusicRadar highly praised it and called it "one of the guitar albums of the year". Claudia Falzone from Outune.net, an Italian music website, also praised AB III and said that it "reveals another unpredictable side" to Alter Bridge, but that because of that, "the earliest fan could not welcome this record immediately" and that the record "will require more than one or two listenings to be appreciated and understood at your best." Petra Whiteley from Reflections of Darkness called AB III "impressive" and a "must-get", and stated that "the musicianship of this album is altogether honed to excellence." She also praised the band by saying that "they are more interested in making music and that authenticity of their art and integrity are more important to them than the commercial side of it." She later went on to say that Alter Bridge "will go far and shouldn't be missed out on." Rick Florino from Artistdirect gave the record an extremely positive review and a perfect 5 out of 5 score. He said that it is "one of the best rock records of 2010" and called it a "sprawling masterpiece that illuminates just how brilliant this band truly is" and "a juggernaut of an album that places the band firmly in the rock 'n' roll pantheon forever." He expanded on this in an interview with Myles Kennedy by calling the album "everything 21st century rock music should be" and saying that it will "establish this band among the most important in the genre." Entertainment Focus also reviewed the album positively, saying, "Overall this is a great album from the band that sees them all stepping up a notch." However, the reviewer noted that AB III will "test some listeners" and that "[f]ans of the previous two albums may find this one a bit more difficult to digest." The Contrapuntist called AB III "a grand achievement and possibly the best hard rock album of the year." Ultimate Guitar named AB III one of the best ten albums of the year 2010. However, not all reviews have been entirely positive. A reviewer from Type 3 Media said, "Overall AB III is a good effort, but it may not hold up to Alter Bridge's previous releases."

So far, AB III has performed better on the charts than any of the band's previous albums. On its first day, AB III reached the No. 1 rock album and No. 4 overall on the iTunes Store in Germany. In Australia, it reached the No. 2 rock album. On October 17, 2010, AB III reached No. 9 in the United Kingdom album charts and No. 1 in the rock album charts. AB III reached the No. 1 rock album, and No. 2 overall, on iTunes in the United States. For the week of November 27, 2010, the album reached No. 17 on the Billboard 200.

== Singles ==
"Isolation" was released as the first single in September 2010. It generally received very positive reviews from the critics. It became the band's first ever song to top the Hot Mainstream Rock Tracks, for 7 weeks. It also topped the active rock charts. It peaked No. 5 position in the Billboard Rock Songs, No. 20 in the Billboard Alternative Songs. "I Know It Hurts" was released as the second single from the album for radio airplay worldwide except the U.S. "Ghost of Days Gone By" was the second in U.S. and third overall single, which was released in April 2011.

== Track listing ==
All tracks are written by Alter Bridge.

No.	Title	Length
1.	"Slip to the Void"	4:52
2.	"Isolation"	4:13
3.	"Ghost of Days Gone By"	4:25
4.	"All Hope Is Gone"	4:48
5.	"Still Remains"	4:45
6.	"Make It Right"	4:15
7.	"Wonderful Life"	5:19
8.	"I Know It Hurts"	3:55
9.	"Show Me a Sign"	5:57
10.	"Fallout"	4:21
11.	"Breathe Again"	4:22
12.	"Coeur d'Alene"	4:31
13.	"Life Must Go On"	4:32
14.	"Words Darker Than Their Wings"	5:24
Total length:		65:39

US edition
No.	Title	Length
15.	"Zero"	4:39
16.	"Home"	3:29
Total length:		73:48

Japanese edition
No.	Title	Length
15.	"Never Born to Follow"	4:06
Total length:		70:13

AB III.5 (special edition)
No.	Title	Length
15.	"Zero"	4:39
16.	"Home"	3:29
17.	"Never Born to Follow"	4:06
Total length:		78:22

== Personnel ==
Alter Bridge

- Myles Kennedy – vocals, guitar
- Mark Tremonti – guitar, backing vocals, co-lead vocals on "Words Darker Than Their Wings"
- Brian Marshall – bass
- Scott Phillips – drums

Additional musicians

- String arrangements by Michael Baskette and Dave Holdredge

Production

- Michael Baskette – producer
- Dave Holdredge – engineer
- Brian Sperber – mixing
- Ted Jensen – mastering
- Daniel Tremonti – cover art
- Jef Moll – digital editing
- Tony Adams – drum technician

== Release history ==
Region	Release date	Label
Australia, Germany, Ireland	October 8, 2010	Roadrunner
United Kingdom	October 11, 2010	Roadrunner
United States	November 9, 2010	Alter Bridge/EMI/Capitol
Japan	November 24, 2010	Roadrunner
Brazil	March 22, 2011	Roadrunner

=== Certifications ===
Country	Sales	Certification
United Kingdom	80,000+	Silver
Worldwide	----	

== Appearances ==
- The song "Isolation" was featured in the video game Dirt 3 in 2011.
