= Tremonti (band) =

American heavy metal band

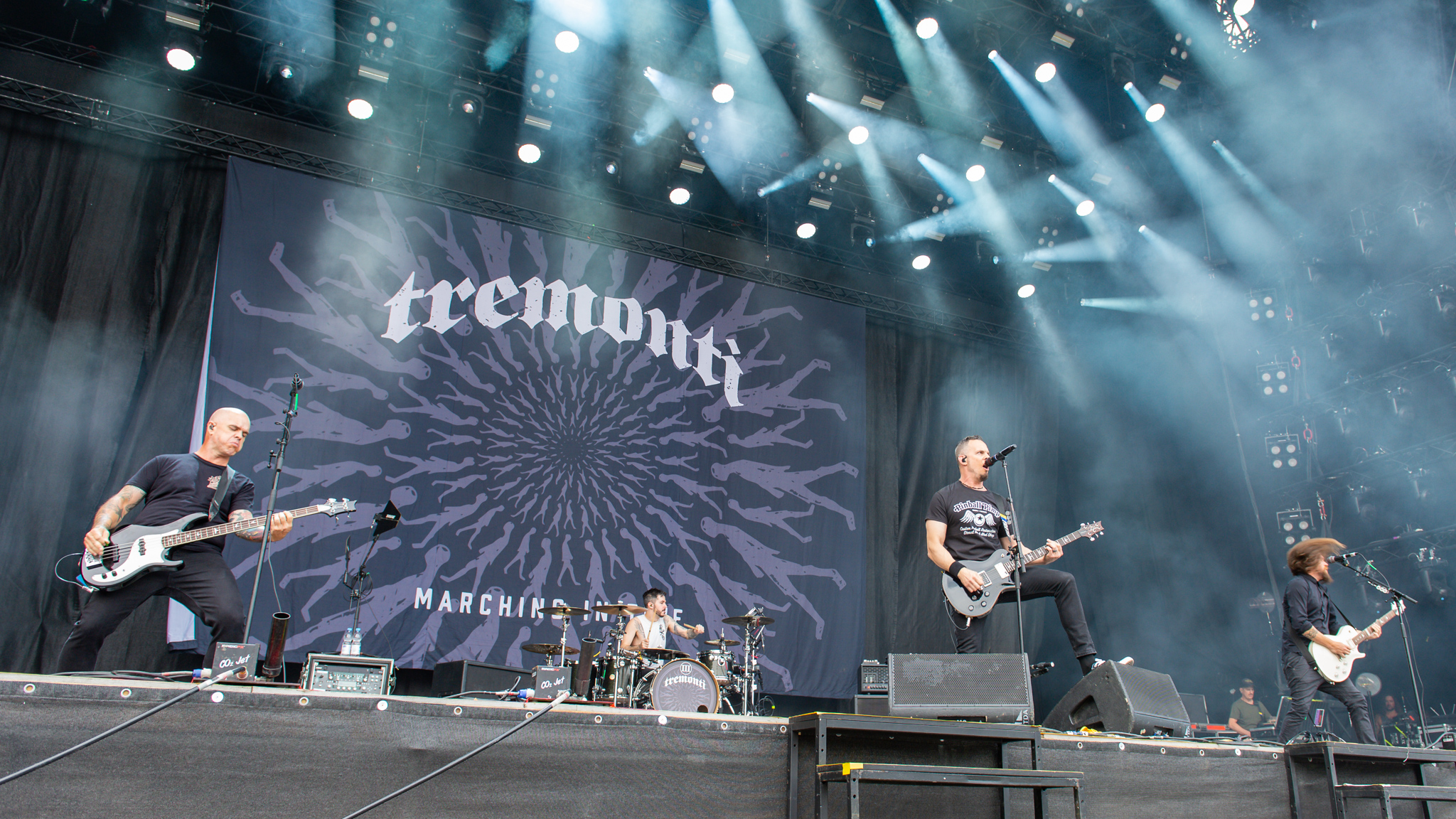
- Tremonti performing at Rock im Park in 2022

Background information
- Origin: Orlando, Florida, U.S.
- Genres: Alternative metal; hard rock; thrash metal
- Years active: 2011–present
- Labels: FRET12; Napalm
- Members: Mark Tremonti; Eric Friedman; Ryan Bennett; Tanner Keegan
- Past members: Wolfgang Van Halen; Garrett Whitlock
- Website: marktremonti.com

Tremonti is an American heavy metal band founded and fronted by lead vocalist and guitarist Mark Tremonti, best known as the lead guitarist of the rock bands Creed and Alter Bridge. The band also consists of rhythm guitarist Eric Friedman, bassist Tanner Keegan and drummer Ryan Bennett. Bassist Wolfgang Van Halen and drummer Garrett Whitlock are former members of the band. Mark Tremonti's Creed and Alter Bridge bandmate Brian Marshall was also a member in 2012.

What originally started as a Mark Tremonti solo project evolved into a fully fledged band that has released six studio albums: All I Was in 2012, Cauterize in 2015, Dust in 2016, A Dying Machine in 2018, Marching in Time in 2021, and The End Will Show Us How in 2025. The band's music is a departure from Mark Tremonti's main bands, featuring more of a thrash metal influence with melodic vocals.

== History ==
Mark Tremonti began expressing interest in releasing a solo album in 2010. "The bands [Creed and Alter Bridge] are so different," he said of his two current main projects. "And I write so much. I'm going to do a solo record because there are some songs that I'd hate to think wouldn't see the light of day because they don't work for Creed or Alter Bridge."

He plays guitar and sings lead on all of the songs himself, and former Submersed members Eric Friedman and Garrett Whitlock perform on the record as well. Tremonti described the music as "melody driven", and in a May 2011 interview said that it would be a "heavier-sounding" thrash metal album. He later said that the album was "probably heavier than either Creed or Alter Bridge", and that it would have "lots of soloing".

Tremonti's first album, All I Was, was released on July 17, 2012, under the label FRET12 Records. "You Waste Your Time" was released as the first single. One day after its release, the song reached number 10 on the iTunes Rock Songs Chart, and Tremonti's live music video for it premiered on May 17, 2012, on Noisecreep.

The band originally consisted of Friedman and Whitlock alongside Alter Bridge and Creed bassist Brian Marshall playing bass guitar as a touring musician. The band performed its first solo concert at The Social in Orlando, Florida, on July 17, 2012, with the performance filmed for a future video release. Wolfgang Van Halen replaced Brian Marshall as a touring bassist in September 2012.

In 2013 Mark Tremonti regrouped with Alter Bridge to record the album Fortress. After a tour, in 2014, Tremonti began recording their second album with Wolfgang Van Halen playing bass. On March 3, 2015, Tremonti released a sample of the song "Radical Change" whilst revealing the album title Cauterize and the track listing for their second album. On Tuesday, March 17, 2015, Tremonti released another song preview for the track "Flying Monkeys" and also gave a concrete release date of June 9, 2015, for Cauterize. On March 20, 2015, Tremonti unveiled via Twitter that the first single, titled "Another Heart", would be released Tuesday, March 24, 2015. On March 23, 2015, the single Another Heart was made available for streaming via FRET12. On March 27, 2015, the artwork for Cauterize was revealed, and it was revealed that it will be the first of two albums to be released as the two albums were recorded together. The second single off the new album, titled "Flying Monkeys", was released in the US on May 15, 2015.

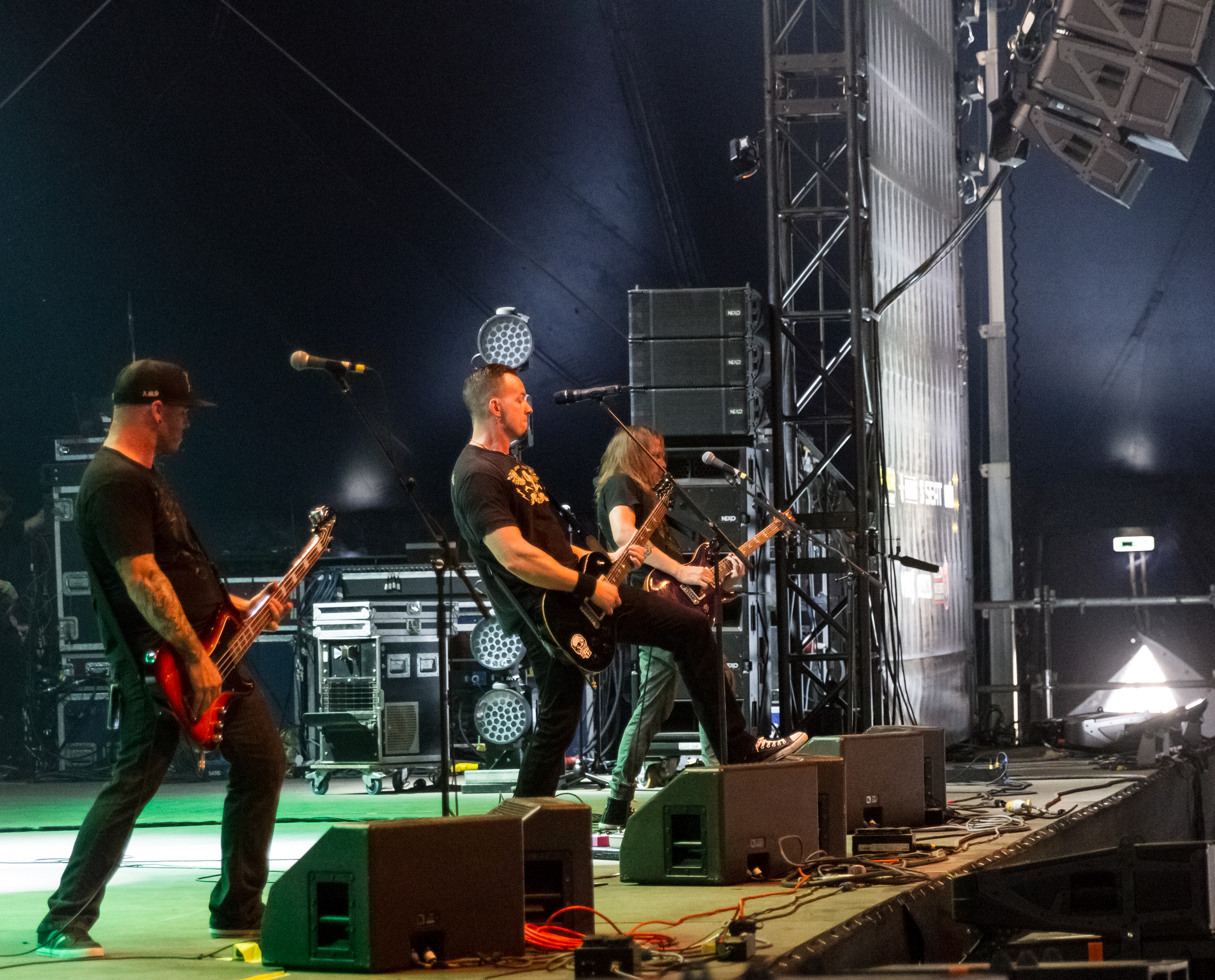
Tremonti at Rock am Ring 2015

The band's third album titled Dust was released on April 29, 2016. The album was recorded at the same time as their previous album, and Tremonti said he "wanted to make sure both albums flowed dynamically. If there were two slow moody songs, [he]'d put one on each album, same thing if there were two really heavy aggressive songs, [he] would split them up evenly. There's isn't a specific theme to one or the other. Each record is mixed" and that "it's definitely not the 'b-sides' of this album".

Mark Tremonti, in February, announced the band's fourth studio album A Dying Machine to be released on June 8, 2018, through Napalm Records. The album is produced by Michael Baskette, who produced all the band's previous albums and the last four Alter Bridge records as well. The listening party and performance event for A Dying Machine were both held on May 12. Tremonti supported Iron Maiden on their European tour in June 2018. In late 2018, drummer Garrett Whitlock did not tour with the band due to a necessary leave of absence for undisclosed personal reasons. Ryan Bennett, a longtime friend of guitarist Eric Friedman, filled in on drums when the tour kicked off in Philadelphia on September 15. It was later confirmed that Bennett would be a permanent replacement for Whitlock. After the band's tour with Sevendust in April, Tremonti said he will go back recording new Alter Bridge record set for October 2019, while interminently tour with his band: "We're gonna go into studio in March and April. And then after that, I go back on tour with Tremonti and then go back on tour with Alter Bridge this winter."

On July 8, 2021, Mark Tremonti announced that the band would be releasing their fifth studio album, Marching in Time, on September 24, 2021. On July 22, they released the first single from the album, "If Not for You".

Tremonti released a new single, "Just Too Much", on August 6, 2024. It is the first single from the band's sixth album The End Will Show Us How, which was released on January 10, 2025.

== Musical style ==
Tremonti's music is very different from Mark Tremonti's other bands Alter Bridge and Creed. He told the German Metal Hammer that the material for his solo band was "much more metal-heavy in terms of songwriting than Alter Bridge". Metal is "still his favorite music", and he cited Metallica as a major influence. Much of the music used for his band was rejected as "too metal" by his bandmates in Alter Bridge and Creed. AllMusic's John D. Buchanan described the band's debut All I Was as "heavy, fast thrash metal", but with a "strongly melodic core with hints of the post-grunge sound that made his other bands so popular". Joe Daly of online magazine The Nervous Breakdown noted that each song is centered around strong, melodic textures that "add depth" to the music.

== Band members ==
Current members

- Mark Tremonti – lead vocals, lead guitar (2011–present)
- Eric Friedman – rhythm guitar, backing vocals, keyboards (2011–present); studio bass (2011–2012; 2016–2021)
- Ryan Bennett – drums (2018–present)
- Tanner Keegan – bass, backing vocals (2021–present; touring 2015–2019)

Former members

- Wolfgang Van Halen – bass, backing vocals (2012–2016)
- Garrett Whitlock – drums (2011–2018)

Touring musicians

- Brian Marshall – bass (2012)

Timeline

== Discography ==
Studio albums

- All I Was (2012)
- Cauterize (2015)
- Dust (2016)
- A Dying Machine (2018)
- Marching in Time (2021)
- The End Will Show Us How (2025)
