= Eric Friedman =

American guitarist (born 1984)

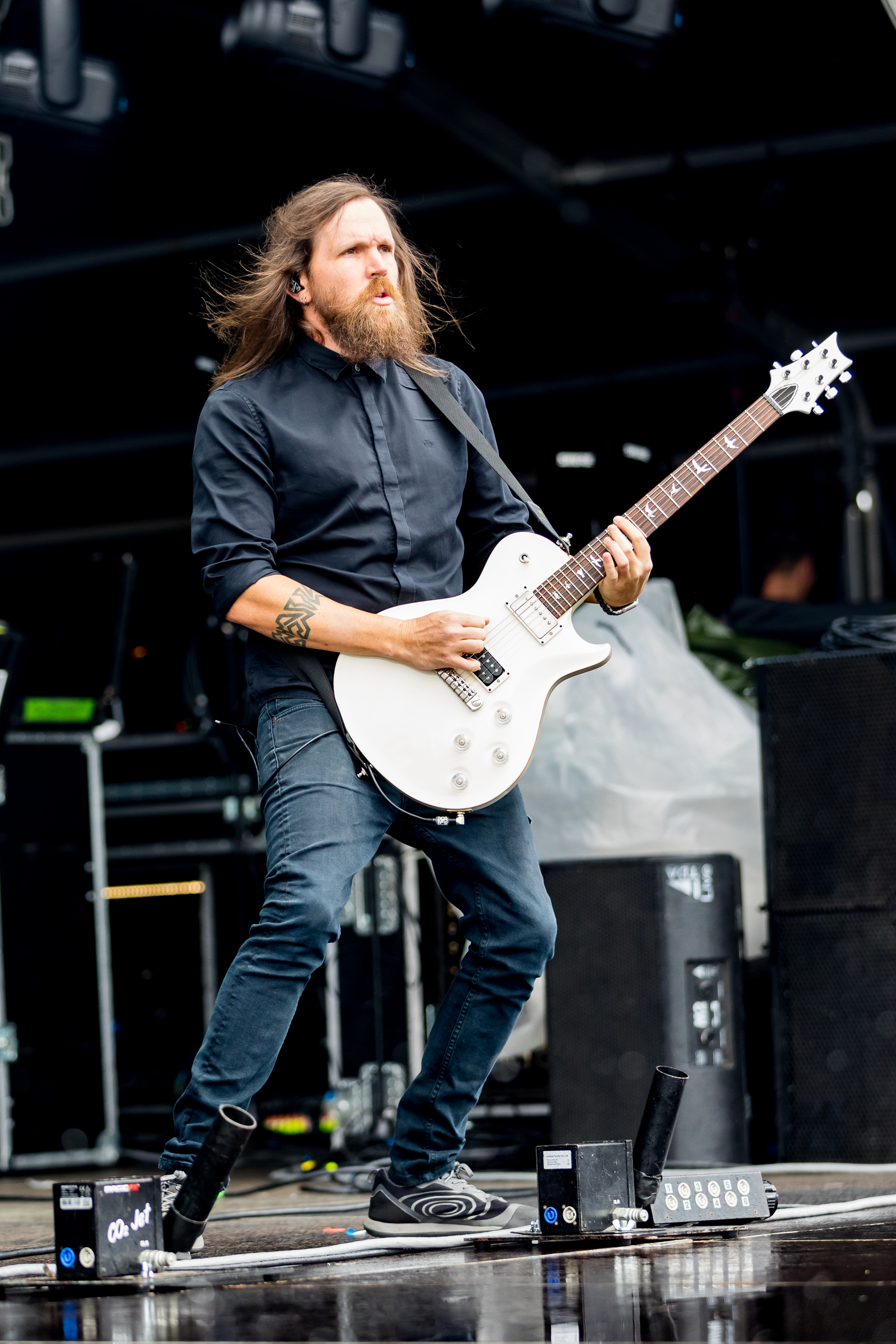
- Friedman with Tremonti in 2022

Background information
- Born: Eric Charles Friedman; June 28, 1984 (age 41); Yorba Linda, California, U.S.
- Origin: Anaheim, California, U.S.
- Genres: Alternative metal; hard rock; post-grunge; thrash metal; heavy metal
- Occupation: Musician
- Instruments: Guitar; vocals; bass
- Years active: 1996–present

Eric Charles "Erock" Friedman (born June 28, 1984) is an American musician, best known as the current guitarist and backing vocalist for the rock band Tremonti and touring guitarist and backing vocalist for Creed. He is the former lead guitarist for the band Submersed and also the current lead guitarist for Daughters of Mara. Submersed disbanded in 2008.

== Background ==
He was born Eric Charles Friedman in Yorba Linda, California. In 1996 while in his teens, he was in the Galaxy Theatre in Santa Ana, California. He got pulled onto stage by Kenny Wayne Shepherd for a jam session during Shepherd's set. Sometime later he formed his own band, The Eric Friedman Band. He also has the distinction of being the youngest guitarist endorsed by Fender at age 13.

== Career ==
=== Early years ===
Friedman opened up for acts such as Buddy Guy, Jimmie Vaughan, and Jonny Lang. He had a developmental record deal with Steve Vai's label Favored Nations at 15.

=== Submersed ===
In 2000, Eric formed a rock band called Blacksun. The group had demos produced by Brett Hestla (Virgos, Dark New Day). Also that year, he became the lead guitarist for the band Submersed, playing on their debut album, In Due Time. Friedman quit the group before the second album, Immortal Verses, released later that year. The band broke up in 2008. During that period, he was the guitarist for Daughters of Mara. This group also broke up that year. He then went on to play with former TNA Impact Wrestling star Christy Hemme, and with Garrett Whitlock, formerly of Submersed.

=== Creed ===
In addition to Kenny Wayne Shepherd, Friedman is influenced by Mark Tremonti of Creed and Alter Bridge and has since formed a close friendship with Tremonti, who requested for Friedman to perform as Creed's rhythm guitarist on tour. Friedman states that he grew up listening to Creed's music, particularly their debut album My Own Prison. While on tour with Creed, he provides rhythm guitar and backing vocals. He also performs a guitar solo with Tremonti on "What If." He appeared as a touring member on Creed's record-breaking live DVD, Creed Live.

=== Tremonti ===
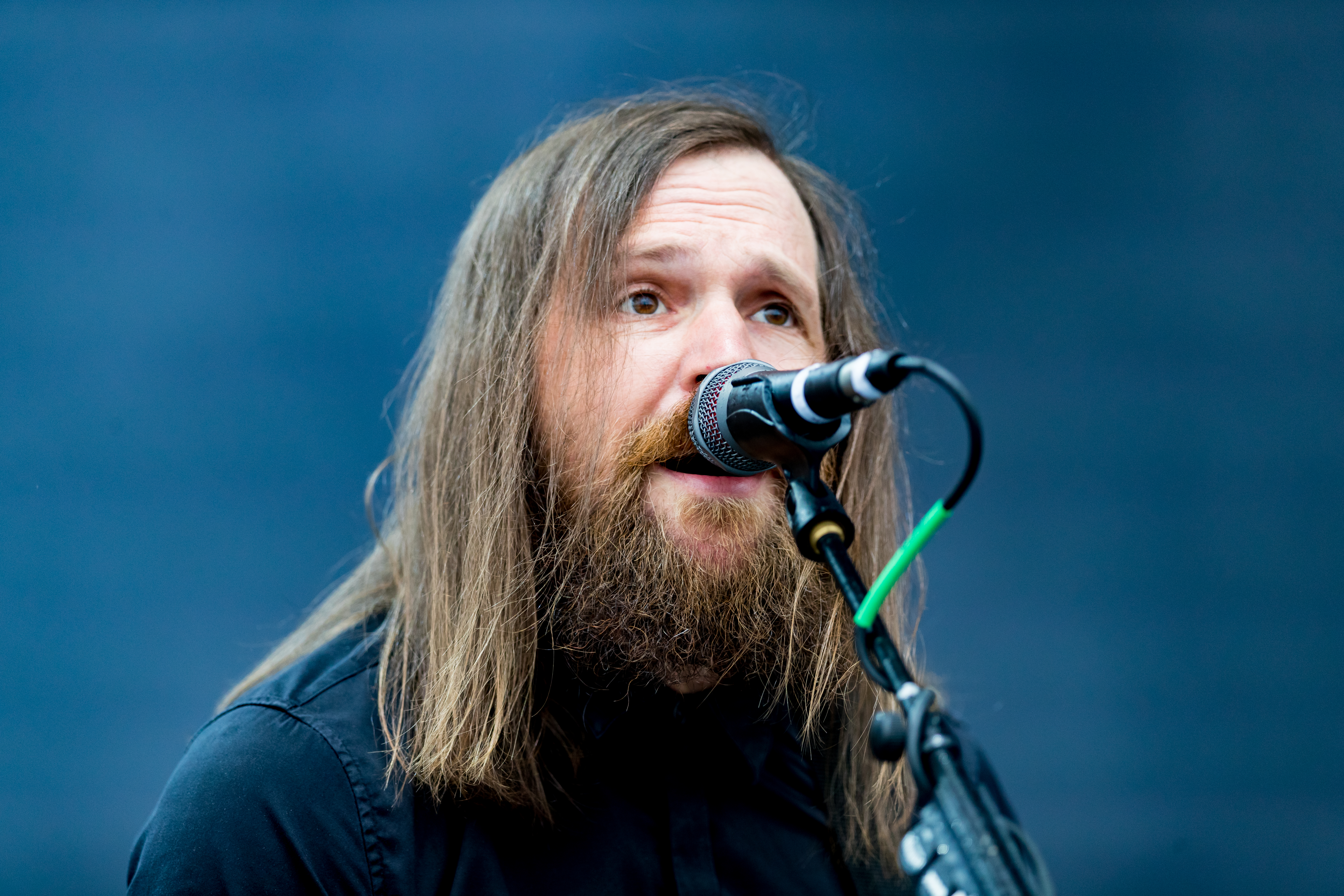
Friedman with Tremonti in 2022

Friedman was featured on Mark Tremonti's debut solo album, All I Was, playing guitar, bass and singing background vocals. He is featured in the music video of "You Waste Your Time". He was then part of the album Cauterize, released in June 2015, and part of Dust, which was released in April 2016.

=== Projected ===
In 2012, Friedman joined the supergroup Projected, alongside Sevendust's John Connolly, Vinnie Hornsby and Creed/Alter Bridge drummer Scott Phillips. Their debut album Human was released on September 18, 2012. Their recent work was Ignite My Insanity which was released under Rat Pak Records on July 21, 2017.

=== Further activities ===
Friedman was nominated "Guitarist of the Week" by The Rock Riff in January, 2013.

In 2015, Friedman was interviewed by The Moshville Times about what it was like playing in a band with Mark Tremonti as well as touring with him.

Friedman was interviewed by Claudia Mancino of RAMzine which was published on December 6, 2018.

== Appearances ==
Eric Friedman appeared on The Sound And The Story which was the third in an instructional-documentary guitar DVD series released in 2011. It starred Troy Stetina and also featured Mark Tremonti, Michael Angelo Batio and Bill Peck.
