= All I Was =

Studio album by Tremonti
- Released: July 17, 2012
- Genres: Hard rock; alternative metal
- Length: 49:25
- Label: FRET12
- Producer: Michael "Elvis" Baskette

Tremonti chronology
All I Was (2012)	Cauterize (2015)

Singles from All I Was
- 1. "You Waste Your Time" Released: May 7, 2012; 2. "So You're Afraid" Released: October 8, 2012; 3. "Wish You Well" Released: January 4, 2013; 4. "All I Was" Released: February 20, 2013; 5. "New Way Out" Released: June 10, 2013

All I Was is the debut studio album by Tremonti, a band formed by the lead guitarist for the American rock bands Creed and Alter Bridge, Mark Tremonti. Produced by Michael "Elvis" Baskette, the hard rock and alternative metal album reached number 5 on the Billboard Hard Rock chart. It showcases the debut of Tremonti as a lead vocalist and features guitarist, bassist, and backing vocalist Eric Friedman and drummer Garrett Whitlock, both former members of Submersed. The album was released to critical acclaim on July 17, 2012, by FRET12 Records.

== Background ==
Tremonti has expressed interest in releasing a solo album since 2010. He said of his two main projects in an interview with the Nottingham Post, "The bands are so different. And I write so much. I'm going to do a solo record because there are some songs that I'd hate to think wouldn't see the light of day because they don't work for Creed or Alter Bridge." He decided to do the album during "a three-month window when [Alter Bridge singer] Myles Kennedy was out with Slash and [Creed singer] Scott Stapp was doing some touring." He described the album as "melody-driven," and as "a heavier-sounding album," with elements of thrash and speed metal. In an interview with Artistdirect, he said that the album is "probably heavier than either Creed or Alter Bridge," and that it will have "lots of soloing." He again emphasized, however, that it will maintain a strong core melody.

Via Facebook, Alter Bridge announced on April 6, 2011, that the tracking for the album had begun, with an accompanying photo of the recording process. On January 20, 2012, Tremonti and FRET12 launched "The Tremonti Project," a website for his solo album where fans can sign up to receive news, previews, live streams, and giveaways. A list of working song titles, the musician lineup (consisting of Tremonti, rhythm guitarist and bassist Eric Friedman, and drummer Garrett Whitlock), and the album title were officially announced on the webpage. On March 20, the album artwork was revealed. According to Tremonti, the album will be released in July 2012 and will be distributed by EMI. He also said he hopes to release the first single from the album soon. In addition, Creed and Alter Bridge bassist Brian Marshall said on Twitter that he will be the bassist for Tremonti's solo project, and he was later confirmed to be a member of Tremonti's touring band for the first leg of the tour. In late April 2012, Tremonti revealed previews for three songs from his album.

According to Billboard, All I Was was set for a July 10, 2012, release on FRET12 Records; "You Waste Your Time" was also announced to be the first single from the album. FMQB reported that "You Waste Your Time" will be released to active rock radio stations in May 2012, and the song was made available for listening on May 6, 2012, on Loudwire.com, a day before its release. The song later reached number 10 on the iTunes Rock Songs Chart. A live music video for the song was released on May 17, 2012. The album's final release date was announced as July 17, 2012, on Ultimate Guitar Archive.

In September 2012 it was announced that Wolfgang Van Halen would replace Marshall as the band's touring bassist. Van Halen was subsequently named an official member of the band in March 2013.

A previously unreleased B-side, "All That I Got", was released as a single on April 16, 2013. Another B-side called "Gone" was released as a single on September 16, 2014.

== Reception ==
Professional ratings
Review scores
Source	Rating
About.com	4/5 stars
AllMusic	(favorable)
Artistdirect	5/5 stars
Revolver	4/5 stars
Ultimate Guitar	9/10 stars

All I Was has received critical acclaim. While declining to give a star rating, AllMusic's James Christopher Monger stated that the album "blend[s] the stadium-sized choruses of Tremonti's previous band with the ferocious attack of classic speed metal, resulting in a voluminous hybrid of brooding post-grunge and breakdown-laden hardcore." In his review of the album, Rick Florino of Artistdirect gave it a positive review and a rating of 5 stars out of 5, commenting, "All I Was stands out as perfect from top to bottom." Paige Camisasca of Revolver magazine wrote, "All I Was reveals the remarkable depth of talent behind one of hard rock's core guitarists."

== Track listing ==
All tracks are written by Mark Tremonti.

No.	Title	Length
1.	"Leave It Alone"	4:39
2.	"So You're Afraid"	3:56
3.	"Wish You Well"	3:00
4.	"Brains"	4:31
5.	"The Things I've Seen"	4:37
6.	"You Waste Your Time"	3:47
7.	"New Way Out"	4:19
8.	"Giving Up"	4:45
9.	"Proof"	4:41
10.	"All I Was"	3:39
11.	"Doesn't Matter"	3:39
12.	"Decay"	3:57
Total length:		49:25

== Personnel ==
Musicians

- Mark Tremonti – lead guitar, lead vocals
- Eric Friedman – rhythm guitar, bass, backing vocals
- Garrett Whitlock – drums

Production

- Michael "Elvis" Baskette – production, mixing
- Jef Moll – engineering
- Kevin Thomas – assistant mixing
- Ted Jensen – mastering
- Stephanie Geny – assistant mastering

== Charts ==
Chart (2012)	Peak position
Austrian Albums Chat	43
Dutch Albums Chart	64
U.S. Billboard 200	29
Billboard Top Rock Albums	7
Top Independent Albums	7
Billboard Top Hard Rock Albums	5
