= Fact (band) =

Japanese post-hardcore band

- Origin: Ibaraki Prefecture, Japan
- Genres: Post-hardcore; easycore; melodic hardcore; metalcore
- Years active: 1999–2015, 2024–present
- Labels: Maximum10; Bullion Records; Hassle Records; Vagrant Records
- Members: Hiro Onose; Kazuki Sakurai; Takahiro Onose; Adam Graham; Tomohiro Takayasu; Eiji Matsumoto
- Past members: Takahiro Nakinashi
- Website: factjapan.com

Fact (stylized in all caps) is a Japanese post-hardcore band, formed in December 1999 in Ibaraki Prefecture.

The members have hidden their faces during every video since 2009 wearing traditional Japanese Noh masks during the time they supported their second album, Fact (2009), but abandoned the imagery in videos the next year in favor of either partially or fully concealing their faces.

They were signed to Maximum10, an indie-rock imprint of the Avex Group until they disbanded in 2015. The band reformed in October 2024.

== History ==
The band was formed from members of other bands in the Tokyo area. They then began to tour the local music scene in and around Chiba, Mito and Tokyo. Originally, Tomohiro played bass and sang with support from Kazuki and Takahiro but, in 2002, main vocal duties as well as a third guitar were added when Hironobu joined. Hironobu had been a member of the band Second Base along with Kazuki before either of them joined Fact.

Continuing onward as a group, the band traveled to the United States, specifically California for a short tour in 2003.

In 2006, they released their first full-length album Never Turn Out the Light to Keep Myself on Japan's Bullion Records (a sublabel of Wave Master).

The band later signed a record deal sometime between 2008 and 2009 with Vagrant Records to release Fact, their worldwide début album. A single from the album, "A Fact of Life", was released with an accompanying video in early 2009. In support of the album, the band toured the U.S. accompanying American bands, including A Skylit Drive, Greeley Estates, Iwrestledabearonce, Memphis May Fire and Senses Fail. Their tour was abruptly cut short after a car collision early on, injuring drummer Eiji, but another U.S. tour was rescheduled soon after.

Their third full-length album, In the Blink of an Eye, was released on 13 January 2010, and its first single, "Slip of the Lip" was released online with an accompanying music video. The album débuted at number six on the Japanese Oricon weekly charts, becoming their first album to reach the top ten.

The band returned to the UK in support of In The Blink of an Eye for a second tour of the country between 24 May and 4 June 2010, with a headlining show at London's O2 Academy Islington and then playing as the support act for the American electronic-rock duo Breathe Carolina during the rest of the dates.

Their single "A Fact of Life" was featured in Konami's rhythm music game Jubeat.

In 2011, they released the singles "Attack Me If You Dare", "Error" and "The Shadow of Envy", all of which were later featured in their extended-play album Eat Your Words.

On 11 January 2012, the band released their fourth album, Burundanga, which features their newest member, Adam (from the United Kingdom), on guitar.

On 27 January 2014 the band released a new single titled Disclosure. The song is the first single off fifth record titled, Witness, available in Japan on 5 March 2014 and worldwide shortly after. Over a year later, Fact released their sixth and final album, KTHEAT, in 2015, before announcing their disbandment just two months later. They held their farewell set at ROCK-O-RAMA 2015 in Shibuya, featuring performances from 18 bands, including Crossfaith, Crystal Lake, HEY-SMITH, Ken Yokoyama, LITE, and MAN WITH A MISSION.

Following the disbandment, members Hironobu Onose, Kazuki Sakurai, and Takahiro Onose formed a new melodic hardcore band called SHADOWS, while Adam Graham, Eiji Matsumoto, and Tomohiro Takayasu, along with former The Amity Affliction guitarist Imran Siddiqi, established Joy Opposites.

In 2024, Bring Me the Horizon used Fact’s sound as a reference on their track "Top 10 staTues tHat CriEd bloOd" from the album POST HUMAN: NeX GEn. Paledusk guitarist DAIDAI, who co-wrote the track, introduced BMTH frontman Oli Sykes to Fact’s 2009 album during the songwriting process.

In October 2024, Fact announced a reunion performance at ‘REDLINE ALL THE FINAL’ in Chiba. Suzuki Kentaro, the event’s organiser, shared on social media that securing Fact’s participation required two years of discussions with the band members.

== Members ==
All band members are credited by either their first name or stage name.

- Hironobu "Hiro" Onose (小野瀬 広宣, Onose Hironobu) – lead vocals (since 2002)
- Kazuki Sakurai (櫻井 一樹, Sakurai Kazuki) – rhythm guitar, backing vocals (since 1999)
- Eiji Matsumoto (松本 英二, Matsumoto Eiji) – drums, percussion, backing vocals (since 1999)
- Tomohiro Takayasu (高安 朝浩, Takayasu Tomohiro) – bass, backing vocals (since 1999); lead vocals (1999–2002)
- Takahiro Onose (小野瀬 孝弘, Onose Takahiro) – lead guitar, backing vocals (since 1999)
- Adam Graham – guitar, backing vocals (since 2012)

=== Past members ===
- Takahiro Nakinashi (中西 高広, Nakinashi Takahiro) – drums

== Musical style ==
Fact has typically been described as post-hardcore. However, with the release of their second album, their style seemed to follow elements of melodic hardcore much more than the precursor. They often incorporate elements of metalcore and mathcore, with latter especially appearing after the release of their third album In the Blink of an Eye. Their fourth record saw an incorporation of much more electronic elements. On their fifth and sixth records, Witness and KTHEAT, they approached their sound from a more traditional hardcore punk perspective. Most of their compositions consist of melodic lead vocals accompanied by gang vocals, rhythmically complex guitar riffs, technical drumming with emphasis on double bass, changing time signatures, and fast upbeat tempos ranging from 180 to 220 bpm.

== Discography ==
=== Albums ===
Year	Album details	Peak chart positions
Year	Album details	JPN
2006	Never Turn Out the Light to Keep Myself: Label: Bullion Records	—
2009	Fact: Label: Maximum10 (Japan), Hassle Records (United Kingdom), and Vagrant Records (USA)	18
2010	In the Blink of an Eye: Label: Maximum10 (Japan) and Hassle Records (United Kingdom)	6
2012	Burundanga: Label: Maximum10 (Japan)	6
2014	Witness: Label: Maximum10 (Japan)	7
2015	KTHEAT: Label: Maximum10 (Japan)	10
"—" denotes a title that did not chart or was not released.

=== Remixes ===
Title	Year	Label
"Nivan Runder Soundrugs"		
"Co3"		

=== Extended plays ===
Title	Year	Label
The Fine Day Never Last	2004	independent release
This Day, This Means (with Nature Living)	2005	independent release
Eat Your Words	2011	Maximum10

=== Singles ===
Year	Title	Album
2006	"Resident in My Room"	Never Turn Out the Light, to Keep Myself
2009	"A Fact of Life"	Fact
2009	"Slip of the Lip"	In the Blink of an Eye
2010	"Behind a Smile"	In the Blink of an Eye
2011	"Error"	Eat Your Words
2012	"Foss"	Burundanga
2012	"Pink Rolex"	Burundanga
2013	"Polyrhythm Winter"	Burundanga
2014	"Disclosure"	Witness
2014	"Miles Away"	Witness
2015	"Wait"	KTHEAT
2015	"The Way Down"	KTHEAT

=== Videography ===
Title	Year	Album	Notes
Deviation		This Day, This Means	
Start from Here		This Fine Day Never Last	
Reborn		This Fine Day Never Last	
Resident in My Room	2006	Never Turn Out the Light, to Keep Myself	
A Fact of Life		Fact	
A Fact of Life		Fact (United States edition)	remix by Boom Boom Satellites
Chain		Fact	
Letter to...			
Slip of the Lip		In the Blink of an Eye	
Rise			remix by Steve Aoki
Behind a Smile		In the Blink of an Eye	
The Shadow of Envy	2013	Eat Your Words	
Error		Eat Your Words	
Attack Me If You Dare		Eat Your Words	
Foss		Burundanga	
Pink Rolex		Burundanga	
Polyrythm Winter		Burundanga	
Disclosure		Witness	
Miles Away		Witness	
Ape		Witness	Lyric Video
Wait		KTHEAT	
The Way Down		KTHEAT	

== See also ==
- List of artists under the Avex Group
- List of post-hardcore bands
- List of Universal Records artists
