= Broken Wings (Alter Bridge song) =

Single by Alter Bridge

from the album One Day Remains
- Released: June 27, 2005
- Genre: Alternative rock; post-grunge
- Length: 5:06 (album version); 4:27 (music video)
- Label: Wind-up
- Songwriter: Mark Tremonti
- Producer: Ben Grosse

Alter Bridge singles chronology
"Find the Real" (2005)	"Broken Wings" (2005)	"Rise Today" (2007)

Music video
- "Broken Wings" on YouTube

"Broken Wings" is a song by American rock band Alter Bridge. The song was the third and final single from the band's debut studio album, One Day Remains. It was not as successful as the previous two singles ("Open Your Eyes" and "Find the Real"). Actor Paul Guilfoyle, known for his role in the hit show CSI: Crime Scene Investigation, appears in the song's music video. The song peaked at number 29 on the Billboard Hot Mainstream Rock Tracks chart.

== Chart performance ==
Chart (2005)	Peak position
US Hot Mainstream Rock Tracks (Billboard)	29
