= Find the Real =

Single by Alter Bridge

from the album One Day Remains
- Released: 2005
- Genre: Post-grunge; alternative metal
- Length: 4:43
- Label: Wind-up
- Songwriters: Mark Tremonti; Myles Kennedy
- Producer: Ben Grosse

Alter Bridge singles chronology
"Open Your Eyes" (2004)	"Find the Real" (2005)	"Broken Wings" (2005)

"Find the Real" is a song by American rock band Alter Bridge. The song was the second of three singles released off of the band's debut studio album, One Day Remains. It became their second top-ten hit, peaking at number seven on the Billboard Mainstream Rock Tracks chart.

== Track listing ==
US radio promo single

1. "Find the Real" (radio edit)
2. "Find the Real" (album version)

== Other media ==
- "Find the Real" was used as the official theme to 2005 WWE Royal Rumble. That year, the band performed an acoustic version of this song on an episode of WWE Raw during a backstage segment with Edge until they were interrupted by Todd Grisham who was about to interview Edge.

== Charts ==
=== Weekly charts ===
Weekly chart performance for "Find the Real"
Chart (2005)	Peak position
US Mainstream Rock (Billboard)	7

=== Year-end charts ===
Year-end chart performance for "Find the Real"
Chart (2005)	Position
US Mainstream Rock Tracks (Billboard)	36
