= One Day Remains =

Studio album by Alter Bridge
- Released: August 10, 2004
- Genres: Post-grunge; hard rock; alternative metal
- Length: 55:23
- Label: Wind-up
- Producers: Ben Grosse; Alter Bridge (co.)

Alter Bridge chronology
One Day Remains (2004)	Blackbird (2007)

Myles Kennedy chronology
Second Skin (2001)	One Day Remains (2004)	Blackbird (2007)

Singles from One Day Remains
- 1. "Open Your Eyes" Released: June 11, 2004; 2. "Find the Real" Released: February 10, 2005; 3. "Broken Wings" Released: June 27, 2005

One Day Remains is the debut album by American rock band Alter Bridge, released on August 10, 2004, on Wind-up Records. The album was produced by Ben Grosse, making it the band's only album to not be produced by Michael "Elvis" Baskette. It has been certified Gold in the United States as of November 2004, with worldwide sales reaching 750,000.

Professional ratings
Review scores
Source	Rating
AllMusic	2/5 stars
Blender	2/5 stars
KNAC	4/5 stars
Slant Magazine	2/5 stars

== Track listing ==
All music is composed by Mark Tremonti.

Original release
No.	Title	Melodies/Lyrics	Length
1.	"Find the Real"	Tremonti; Myles Kennedy	4:43
2.	"One Day Remains"	Tremonti; Kennedy	4:05
3.	"Open Your Eyes"	Tremonti; Kennedy	4:58
4.	"Burn It Down"	Tremonti	6:11
5.	"Metalingus"	Tremonti; Kennedy	4:19
6.	"Broken Wings"	Tremonti	5:06
7.	"In Loving Memory"	Tremonti	5:40
8.	"Down to My Last"	Tremonti	4:46
9.	"Watch Your Words"	Tremonti	5:25
10.	"Shed My Skin"	Tremonti	5:08
11.	"The End Is Here"	Tremonti; Kennedy	4:57
Total length:			55:23

20th anniversary edition lp and digital bonus tracks
No.	Title	Melodies/Lyrics	Length
12.	"Save Me"	Tremonti	3:28
13.	"One Day Remains" (Live at Phase One Studios, Toronto, CA / March 28, 2005)	Tremonti; Kennedy	3:58
14.	"Burn it Down" (Live at Phase One Studios, Toronto, CA / March 28, 2005)	Tremonti	5:51
15.	"Open Your Eyes" (Live at Phase One Studios, Toronto, CA / March 28, 2005)	Tremonti; Kennedy	6:02
16.	"Broken Wings" (Live at Phase One Studios, Toronto, CA / March 28, 2005)	Tremonti	5:08
17.	"Metalingus" (Live at Phase One Studios, Toronto, CA / March 28, 2005)	Tremonti; Kennedy	4:15

== Track information ==
=== "Metalingus" ===
Although never released as a single, "Metalingus" is one of Alter Bridge's most popular songs and is a live staple. The song has been used by professional wrestler and WWE Hall of Famer Adam "Edge" Copeland as his entrance theme in WWE from 2004 onward. From March to June 2022, he changed his entrance theme to another Alter Bridge song, "The Other Side", which would later be the entrance music for The Judgment Day stable after Edge was removed from the group. He continued to use "Metalingus" once more after returning at SummerSlam 2022 and after joining All Elite Wrestling (AEW) in October 2023.

=== "In Loving Memory" ===
Like "Metalingus", "In Loving Memory" was never released as a single, though it is one of the band's most popular songs among fans. On November 5, 2008 in Glasgow, an electric version of the song was performed for the first time, and has since become a regular feature in their live shows.

Mark Tremonti wrote the song about the death of his mother, Mary Elizabeth Tremonti, who died in 2002. In an interview he said: "There are a lot of themes on this record that are very personal, for example 'In Loving Memory' is about my mother who recently passed away. In terms of purely personal significance, you cannot get any deeper than that. It is definitely a sad song."

== Personnel ==
Alter Bridge

- Myles Kennedy – lead vocals
- Mark Tremonti – guitars, backing vocals
- Brian Marshall – bass
- Scott Phillips – drums

Additional personnel

- Ben Grosse – production, recording, mixing
- Alter Bridge – co-production, arrangements
- Blumpy – digital engineering and editing, keyboards and programming
- Jamie Muhoberac – keyboards and programming
- Adam Barber – digital engineering and editing
- Shilpa Patel – additional editing and tech support
- Jack Odom and Shaun Evans – recording assistants
- Paul Pavao and Chuck Bailey – mixing and additional recording assistants
- David Campbell – string arrangements on "In Loving Memory" and "The End Is Here"
- Tony Adams – drum tech
- Ernie Hudson – guitar tech
- Tom Baker – mastering at Precision Mastering, Hollywood, CA

Management

- Diana Meltzer – A&R
- Gregg Wattenberg – A&R-Wind-up production supervision
- Chipper – A&R administration
- Jeff Hanson, Jeff Cameron and Randy Dease (JHMP/Bombtrax Management) – management
- Ken Fermaglich and Neil Warnock (The Agency Group – New York & London) – booking agents
- Garry Whitfield and Dave Johnson (Whitfield and Johnson/Temp CFO, Inc.) – business management
- Jim Zumwalt and Orville Almon (Zumwalt, Almon & Hayes) and Mark Passler (Akerman Senterfitt) – legal representation
- Lisa C. Socransky and Brian McClain – additional legal representation
- Andrew Weiss (Lighthouse Touring) – management
- Thom Trumbo (Moir/Marie Entertainment) – producer management and coordination

Artwork

- Daniel Tremonti (Core 12) – art direction and design, photography
- Pat Costa – photography
- Pamela Littky – band photography

== Charts ==
Chart (2004)	Peak position
Australian Albums (ARIA)	37
Dutch Albums (Album Top 100)	56
German Albums (Offizielle Top 100)	61
New Zealand Albums (RMNZ)	25
Scottish Albums (OCC)	90
Swiss Albums (Schweizer Hitparade)	54
UK Albums (OCC)	102
Uk Rock & Metal Albums (OCC)	7
US Billboard 200	5

== Certifications ==
Region	Certification	Certified units/sales
United Kingdom (BPI)	Gold	100,000^{‡}
United States (RIAA)	Gold	500,000^{^}
^{^} Shipments figures based on certification alone.^{‡} Sales+streaming figures based on certification alone.
