= Blackbird (Alter Bridge album) =

2007 studio album by Alter Bridge

Studio album by Alter Bridge
- Released: October 5, 2007
- Recorded: February 2007 – May 2007
- Studios: Blackbird Studio (Nashville, Tennessee); Studio Barbarosa (Orlando, Florida)
- Genres: Alternative metal; hard rock; post-grunge
- Length: 59:17
- Label: Universal Republic
- Producer: Michael Baskette

Alter Bridge chronology
One Day Remains (2004)	Blackbird (2007)	AB III (2010)

Myles Kennedy chronology
One Day Remains (2004)	Blackbird (2007)	Live from Amsterdam (2009)

Singles from Blackbird
- 1. "Rise Today" Released: July 30, 2007; 2. "Watch Over You" Released: January 14, 2008; 3. "Ties That Bind" Released: January 21, 2008 (UK); 4. "Before Tomorrow Comes" Released: April 22, 2008

Blackbird is the second studio album by American rock band Alter Bridge, released on October 5, 2007. The first single, "Rise Today", was released on July 30, 2007. The album peaked at number 13 on the Billboard 200, selling 47,000 copies in its first week on the charts. As of December 2008, Blackbird has sold 227,000 copies. Despite receiving poor marketing and generally low mainstream success, initial critical reception towards the album was mostly positive, with music critics praising the songwriting and musicianship. The album was certified Gold by the British Phonographic Industry.

== Background ==
The band stated in early 2006 that the song writing process was two thirds complete. On February 8, 2007, the band announced that all of the album's songwriting was finished and that they would be entering the studio to begin the recording process for the new record. It was then announced on May 11, 2007 (by guitarist Mark Tremonti on www.thealterbridgenation.com), that the recording of the album was complete, the mixing had been finished, and only a few small minor things were still to be done.

On July 23, 2007, there was another official press release containing the official release date for the first single from the album, the track listing for the album, and news that tour dates would be released at a later time. Three days later, Alter Bridge uploaded two new songs to their official MySpace page for fans to listen to as a taste of the new album. The songs were "Ties That Bind" and the album's single "Rise Today".

A UK version of the album was released on October 8 with a special UK bonus track titled "We Don't Care at All", a track also found on the iTunes version of the album. There is also a version of the album sold exclusively through Best Buy that contains the two bonus tracks "The Damage Done" and "New Way to Live", and a Walmart version with a bonus DVD containing exclusive interviews and an in-depth look at the making of the album.

Also, prior to the album's official release, Universal Republic Records put up a page of e-cards on their main home page on August 24, 2007, which contained the then-unreleased "Before Tomorrow Comes", "Watch Over You", "Buried Alive", and "Come to Life". They were then removed on Saturday, August 25, as their discovery resulted in many fans accessing them in a short period of time. Their online availability appears to have been a mistake on Universal's part, but it could also have been a unique marketing strategy.

On March 19, 2009, the band released a tablature book for the album, containing the tablature sheet music for every song on the album.

While a large majority of the songs on One Day Remains were written before Myles Kennedy came on board, this time around it was a collaborative effort with Tremonti and Kennedy sharing the songwriting duties, while all four band members worked on the arrangements. All four members have songwriting credits on the album.

In "Wayward One", the melody of the chorus is based on the theme of the Bourrée in E minor (Suite BWV996) of J. S. Bach.

=== Label changes ===
Alter Bridge left Wind-Up Records in 2006 due to Wind-Up pressing for a Creed reunion, which, in fact, actually later happened (all of Alter Bridge's members excluding Kennedy are also members of Creed), and subsequently signed to Universal Republic Records. The band's second label change occurred in 2010; Blackbird's follow-up, AB III, was released on Roadrunner Records worldwide, with the exception of North America where it was self-released via Capitol Records. The band dropped their contract with Universal Republic likely due to the way the label handled the release of Alter Bridge's 2009 live album/DVD Live from Amsterdam.

== Singles ==
"Rise Today" was the first single from the album. It was officially released on July 30, 2007. The music video of "Rise Today" was released on Yahoo! on October 4, 2007. It was also made available for download on iTunes on July 31, 2007.

The single received a release date in the UK set for October 15, on both CD and 7" Picturedisc.

At their concert on October 30, 2007 in Dallas, Texas, the group recorded a live music video for a future single, "Ties That Bind". It was later announced that "Ties That Bind" would be released as a single in the UK and Europe and that the video would be used to promote that single. On January 2, 2008, it was announced that "Watch Over You" would be the second single from Blackbird. There is also currently a duet version of "Watch Over You" featuring Cristina Scabbia of Lacuna Coil found on the band's MySpace. "Watch Over You" was featured in promos and during the season finale of Celebrity Rehab with Dr. Drew. The second version of the music video aired on VH1 containing clips from the show. "Before Tomorrow Comes" was released as the fourth and final single off the album in April 2008, and the third to be released in the United States.

== Reception ==
Professional ratings
Review scores
Source	Rating
411Mania	9.0/10
AllMusic	3.5/5 stars
Bullz-Eye	4.5/5 stars
Hard Rock Hideout	9/10 stars
The Metal Forge	9/10 stars
TuneLab	9.5/10

Blackbird was met with critical acclaim upon its release. It debuted at number 37 on the UK Albums Chart, and at number 2 on the UK Rock Album Chart. In the US, it debuted at number 13 on the Billboard 200 chart and number 4 on the Billboard Rock Albums chart, selling about 47,000 copies in its first week and 227,000 copies by 2008.

== Track listing ==
All tracks are written by Alter Bridge.

No.	Title	Length
1.	"Ties That Bind"	3:19
2.	"Come to Life"	3:51
3.	"Brand New Start"	4:54
4.	"Buried Alive"	4:35
5.	"Coming Home"	4:19
6.	"Before Tomorrow Comes"	4:06
7.	"Rise Today"	4:21
8.	"Blackbird"	7:58
9.	"One by One"	4:20
10.	"Watch Over You"	4:19
11.	"Break Me Down"	3:56
12.	"White Knuckles"	4:24
13.	"Wayward One"	4:47
Total length:		59:17

iTunes/UK version
No.	Title	Length
14.	"We Don't Care at All"	3:42
Total length:		62:59

Best Buy version
No.	Title	Length
14.	"The Damage Done"	3:45
15.	"New Way to Live"	5:40
Total length:		68:42

== Personnel ==
Alter Bridge

- Myles Kennedy – lead vocals, guitar
- Mark Tremonti – guitar, backing vocals
- Brian Marshall – bass
- Scott Phillips – drums

Production

- Michael "Elvis" Baskette – production
- Dave Holdredge – recording (assisted by John Netti)
- Jeff Moll – digital engineering
- Brian Sperber – mixing at Electric Lady Studio, New York, NY (assisted by Noah Goldstein)
- Tony Adams – drum tech
- Ernie Hudson – guitar tech
- Brian "Big Bass" Gardner – mastering at Bernie Grundman Studios, Los Angeles, CA

Management

- Michael Tremonti – press/fan liaison
- Tom Mackay – A&R
- Paul Geary and Steve Wood (Azoff Music Management) – management
- Ken Fermaglich and Neil Warnock (The Agency Group – New York & London) – booking agents
- Scott Adair (London & Co.) – business management
- Orville Almon and Jim Zumwalt (Zumwalt, Almon, and Hayes) and Mark Passler (Akerman Senterfitt) – legal representation
- Lisa C. Socransky-Austin and Brian McClain – additional legal representation
- Keith Hagan (PFA Entertainment) – PR
- Heather Hawkins (AAM) – product management

Artwork

- Daniel Tremonti (Core 12) – art direction and design
- Chapman Baehler – band photography

== Charts ==
=== Album ===
Chart (2007)	Peak position
Austrian Albums Chart	64
Dutch Albums Chart	55
German Albums Chart	55
Scottish Album Chart	38
Swiss Albums Chart	83
Swedish Albums Chart	56
US Billboard 200	13
US Top Rock Albums	4
UK Album Chart	37
UK Rock Album Chart	2

=== Singles ===
Year	Title	US Main	US Alt	UK Rock
2007	"Rise Today"	3	32	3
2008	"Ties That Bind"^{[a]}	—	—	3
2008	"Watch Over You"	19	—	—
2008	"Before Tomorrow Comes"	29	—	—
"—" denotes the single failed to chart, was not released, or was not certified.

a "Ties That Bind" was only released as a single in the United Kingdom.

== Certifications ==
Region	Certification	Certified units/sales
United Kingdom (BPI)	Gold	100,000^{‡}
^{‡} Sales+streaming figures based on certification alone.

== Release history ==
Region	Release date	Label
Ireland	October 5, 2007	Universal Republic
United Kingdom	October 8, 2007	Universal Republic
United States	October 9, 2007	Universal Republic
Australia	October 20, 2007	Universal Republic
Japan	December 4, 2007	Universal Republic

== Appearances ==
- The song "Come to Life" was featured in the video game Guitar Hero: Van Halen in 2009.
- The song "Ties That Bind" was featured in the video game Guitar Hero: Warriors of Rock in 2010.
