= Rise Today =

Single by Alter Bridge

from the album Blackbird
- Released: July 31, 2007
- Genre: Alternative metal
- Length: 4:21 (album version); 4:14 (single version); 3:39 (radio edit)
- Label: Universal Republic
- Songwriters: Mark Tremonti; Myles Kennedy; Brian Marshall; Scott Phillips
- Producer: Michael "Elvis" Baskette

Alter Bridge singles chronology
"Broken Wings" (2005)	"Rise Today" (2007)	"Watch Over You" (2008)

Music video
- "Rise Today" on YouTube

"Rise Today" is a song by American rock band Alter Bridge. Written by lead guitarist Mark Tremonti and lead vocalist Myles Kennedy, it was produced by Michael "Elvis" Baskette and appeared on the band's 2007 second studio album Blackbird. The track was released as the lead single from the album on July 31, 2007, peaking at number 3 on the Billboard Mainstream Rock chart.

== Composition and lyrics ==
According to Alter Bridge lead guitarist Mark Tremonti, "Rise Today" is a song written "about asking yourself what you can do to change the world for the better [...] what [you] can do to make the world a better place [... and] how you can be a better person". Speaking after the song's release, Tremonti explained that fans had initially misconstrued the meaning of the song somewhat. In an interview with The Pulse of Radio, the guitarist commented that "it's already getting kind of looked at the wrong way, where people think it's an anti-war song or whatnot, [but] it's more of a, you know, let's check ourselves and see if we can do something better for any given situation".

== Promotion and release ==
"Rise Today" was released as the first single from Blackbird on July 31, 2007. The song was also used in a number of television commercials, including promotional spots for CSI: Miami and Terminator: The Sarah Connor Chronicles and was used as the main theme song of the WWE pay-per-view Unforgiven in September 2007. Tremonti described the partnership by noting that "It's kind of an uplifting, energetic song that seems to fit well". "Rise Today" has been performed consistently during live shows since its release; according to set list aggregation website Setlist.fm, it is the band's second most-frequently performed song, after "Metalingus". It is often played as the final song of the set.

== Music video ==
The music video for "Rise Today" was filmed in a rehearsal space in the band's hometown of Orlando, Florida with director Dale "Rage" Resteghini and released on October 5, 2007. Speaking about the production process, Resteghini commented that "I feel [this] is going to be one of my biggest rock videos ever. The song is amazing and the way we shot it, on anamorphic and spherical lenses on 16mm using all kinds of film stocks including reversal film, true black-and-white as well as cross processing some of the neg, allowed me to really get creative with this video".

== Reception ==
=== Commercial ===
"Rise Today" entered the US Billboard Mainstream Rock Songs chart at number 32 for the week of August 18, 2007. It peaked at number 3 on the chart three months later, spending a total of 26 weeks on the chart. On the Alternative Songs (then known as Hot Modern Rock Songs) chart, the song entered at number 38 and peaked at number 32, spending 12 weeks in the top 40. Outside of the US, "Rise Today" reached number 3 on the UK Rock & Metal Singles Chart in October 2007.

=== Critical ===
In his review of Blackbird, Vik Bansal of musicOMH praised "Rise Today" as one of the highlights of the album, alongside "Before Tomorrow Comes", noting that the two singles "have obvious but oh so pleasurable hooks" and claiming that all three represent the record's "peak creative powers". In a 2016 feature for TeamRock, Henry Yates ranked "Rise Today" as the second best song by the band (after "Blackbird"), praising its "emotional resonance" and "force-ten execution".

== Track listings ==
All tracks are written by Mark Tremonti and Myles Kennedy.

CD single, 7" picture disc and digital download
No.	Title	Length
1.	"Rise Today" (single version)	4:14
2.	"New Way to Live"	5:40
Total length:		9:54

Promotional CD single
No.	Title	Length
1.	"Rise Today" (radio edit)	3:39
2.	"Rise Today" (single version)	4:14
Total length:		7:53

== Charts ==
=== Weekly charts ===
Weekly chart performance for "Rise Today"
Chart (2007)	Peak position
UK Physical Singles (Official Charts)	61
UK Rock & Metal (Official Charts)	3
US Alternative Airplay (Billboard)	32
US Mainstream Rock (Billboard)	3

=== Year-end charts ===
2007 year-end chart performance for "Rise Today"
Chart (2007)	Position
US Mainstream Rock Songs (Billboard)	34

2008 year-end chart performance for "Rise Today"
Chart (2008)	Position
US Mainstream Rock Songs (Billboard)	39
