= Before Tomorrow Comes =

Single by Alter Bridge

from the album Blackbird
- Released: April 22, 2008
- Genre: Hard rock; alternative metal
- Length: 4:06
- Label: Universal Republic
- Songwriters: Myles Kennedy; Brian Marshall; Mark Tremonti; Scott Phillips
- Producer: Michael "Elvis" Baskette

Alter Bridge singles chronology
"Watch Over You" (2008)	"Before Tomorrow Comes" (2008)	"Isolation" (2010)

"Before Tomorrow Comes" is a song by American rock band Alter Bridge and the third international, fourth overall, and final single from the band's second album Blackbird. On April 3, 2008, the song was announced to be the fourth single in the United Kingdom and the third single released worldwide. It debuted at No. 36 on Billboard Mainstream Rock Tracks and peaked at No. 29.
