= Open Your Eyes (Alter Bridge song) =

Single by Alter Bridge

from the album One Day Remains
- Released: June 11, 2004
- Length: 4:31 (radio edit); 4:58 (album version)
- Label: Wind-up
- Songwriters: Mark Tremonti; Myles Kennedy
- Producer: Ben Grosse

Alter Bridge singles chronology
"Open Your Eyes" (2004)	"Find the Real" (2005)

Music video
- "Open Your Eyes" on YouTube

"Open Your Eyes" is a song by American rock band Alter Bridge. The song, which is one of the band's biggest hits, was released as the first single off their 2004 debut album One Day Remains. It peaked at No. 2 on the US Mainstream Rock Tracks chart in 2004, the band's highest-charting single on that chart until "Isolation" reached No. 1 in 2011. The song "Save Me", which appears on the soundtrack for Elektra, is also on the "Open Your Eyes" single as a b-side. Like many songs on the album, "Open Your Eyes" is about regrets and is one of the six songs on the record co-written by singer Myles Kennedy. The chorus seems to be encouraging peace. Lead guitarist Mark Tremonti originally wanted "Down to My Last" to be the first single, but the record company rejected it, saying it sounded too much like Creed, the then-former band of Tremonti, bassist Brian Marshall, and drummer Scott Phillips. "Open Your Eyes" was chosen instead.

During live performances, the band usually plays "Open Your Eyes" either as the last song before the encore or as part of the encore as the penultimate song before closer "Rise Today." The midsection of the song is often extended in concert and typically involves the crowd joining Kennedy in singing.

== Track listing ==
1. "Open Your Eyes" (radio edit) – 4:31 (Mark Tremonti, Myles Kennedy)
2. "Open Your Eyes" (album version) – 4:58 (Tremonti, Kennedy)
3. "Save Me" – 3:27 (Mark Tremonti)
4. "Open Your Eyes" (music video)

== Charts ==
=== Weekly charts ===
Weekly chart performance for "Open Your Eyes"
Chart (2004)	Peak position
Australia (ARIA)	49
Canada Radio (Nielsen BDS)	38
Canada Rock Top 30 (Radio & Records)	3
US Bubbling Under Hot 100 (Billboard)	23
US Alternative Airplay (Billboard)	24
US Mainstream Rock (Billboard)	2

=== Year-end charts ===
Year-end chart performance for "Open Your Eyes"
Chart (2004)	Position
US Mainstream Rock Tracks (Billboard)	19
US Modern Rock Tracks (Billboard)	84

== Other media ==
- An edited version of the song was featured in the 2004 video game Madden NFL 2005.
- After the Boston Red Sox won the 2004 World Series, a live video of Alter Bridge performing "Open Your Eyes" with then-Red Sox players Johnny Damon, Kevin Millar, and Bronson Arroyo surfaced on the internet and was later posted temporarily on the band's website after they left Wind-Up Records.
- The band performed the song with Damon and Mike Piazza onstage at the 2005 Major League Baseball Home Run Derby in Detroit that was held on the eve of the All-Star Game.
- "Open Your Eyes" was one of the official theme songs for the 2004 WWE Raw Diva Search competition where it was mainly used as the elimination song.
