= Edge (wrestler) =

Canadian professional wrestler and actor (born 1973)

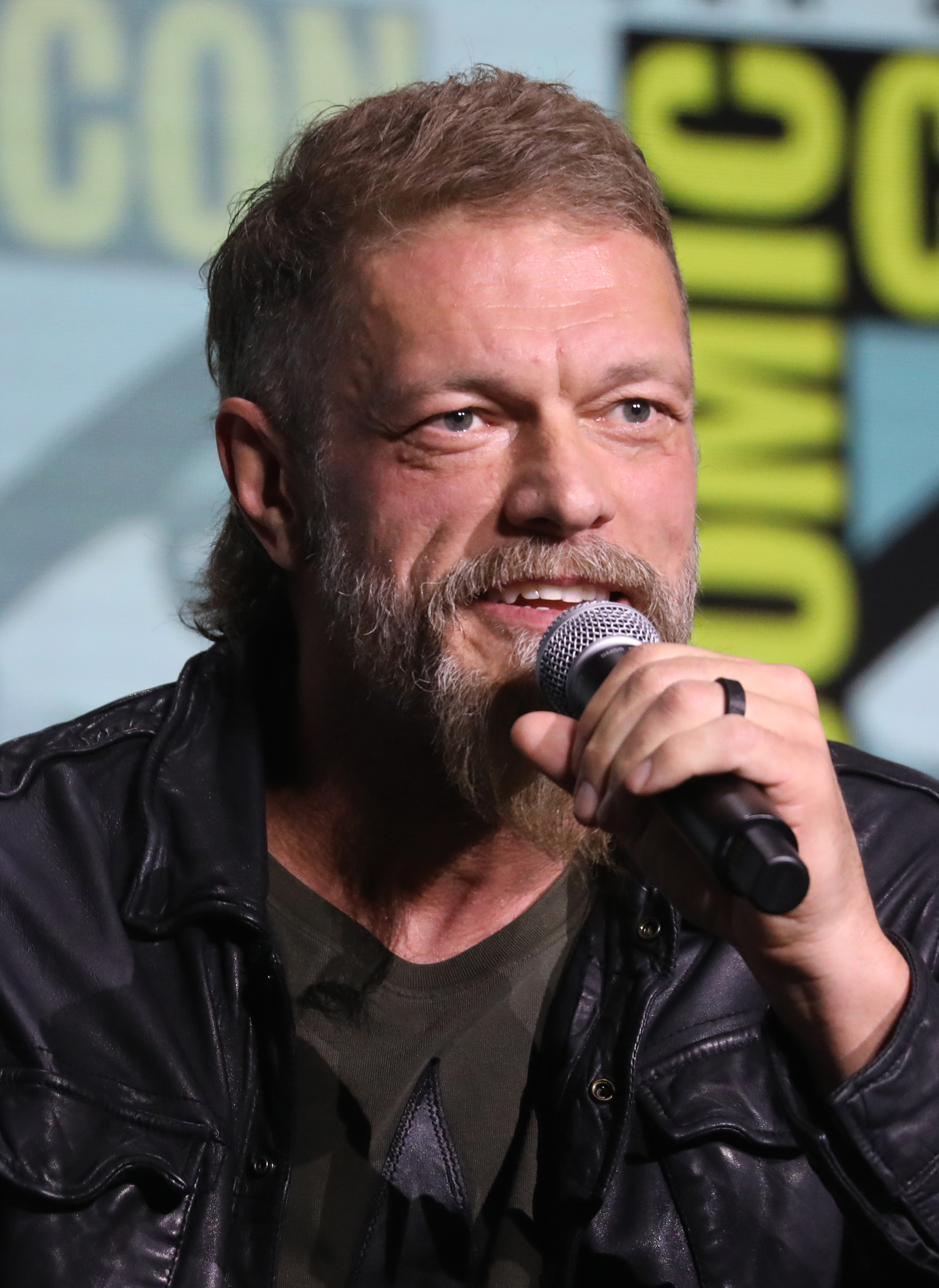
- Copeland in 2024
- Born: Adam Joseph Copeland; October 30, 1973 (age 53); Orangeville, Ontario, Canada
- Occupations: Professional wrestler; actor
- Years active: 1992–2011, 2020–present (wrestler) 2011–present (actor)
- Spouses: Alannah Morley (m. 2001; div. 2004); Lisa Ortiz (m. 2004; div. 2005); Beth Phoenix (m. 2016)
- Children: 2
- Professional wrestling career
- Ring name(s): Adam Copeland; Adam Impact; Cope; Conquistador Uno; Damon Striker; Edge; Sexton Hardcastle
- Billed height: 6 ft 5 in (196 cm)
- Billed weight: 241 lb (109 kg)
- Billed from: Toronto, Ontario, Canada
- Trained by: Bret Hart; Dory Funk Jr. Leo Burke; Ron Hutchison; Sweet Daddy Siki
- Debut: July 1, 1992

Adam Joseph Copeland (born October 30, 1973) is a Canadian professional wrestler and actor. He is signed to All Elite Wrestling (AEW), where he performs under his real name and is one-half of Cage & Cope with Christian Cage. He is best known for his tenures in World Wrestling Federation/Entertainment (WWF/WWE), where he performed from 1998 to 2011 and again from 2020 to 2023 under the ring name Edge.

Copeland made his professional wrestling debut in 1992, wrestling in many independent promotions and competing in singles and tag team competition, the latter with long-time friend Christian Cage. In 1997, he signed a developmental deal with the World Wrestling Federation (WWF, renamed WWE in 2002) and made his televised debut in 1998 under the ring name Edge. After winning the Intercontinental Championship in 1999, he formed a tag team with Christian, and the two won the World Tag Team Championship seven times. During this time, they gained notoriety due to their participation in Tables, Ladders, and Chairs matches. They are considered one of the major teams that revived tag team wrestling during the Attitude Era. The team split in 2001 and Edge embarked on a successful solo career. He won a total of 31 championships in WWE, holding the World Heavyweight Championship (2002–2013 version) a record seven times, the WWE Championship four times, the Intercontinental Championship five times, the United States Championship once, the World Tag Team Championship a record 12 times, and the WWE Tag Team Championship twice. He is WWE's 14th Triple Crown Champion and 7th Grand Slam Champion. He won the 2001 King of the Ring tournament, the first Money in the Bank ladder match at WrestleMania 21 in 2005, and the 2010 Royal Rumble match, making him the first wrestler to achieve all three.

Edge first retired in 2011 due to several neck injuries and was inducted into the WWE Hall of Fame the next year. Nine years after retiring, he returned to wrestling as a surprise entrant in the 2020 Royal Rumble match and won the next year's Royal Rumble, becoming the eighth man to win the Royal Rumble twice, the third to win it as the first entrant, and the first to win it after being inducted into the WWE Hall of Fame. He headlined multiple pay-per-view (PPV) events for WWE, including WrestleMania 24 and WrestleMania 37 - Night 2, being one of the company's most prolific PPV performers. After his WWE contract expired in September 2023, he joined AEW the next month and debuted at WrestleDream, going on to win the AEW TNT Championship twice and the AEW World Tag Team Championship once with Christian Cage.

Adam Copeland has acted in the films Highlander: Endgame (2000), Bending the Rules (2012) and Money Plane (2020). He has made guest appearances on TV shows such as Weakest Link, Mind of Mencia, Deal or No Deal, MADtv, and The Flash. He played Dwight Hendrickson on the Syfy series Haven (2011–2015), Ketill Flatnose in Vikings (2017–2020), and Ares in the Disney+ series Percy Jackson and the Olympians (2023–present), the latter of which earned him an Emmy Award nomination for Outstanding Supporting Performer in a Preschool, Children's or Young Teen Program.

== Early life ==
Adam Joseph Copeland was born in Orangeville, Ontario, on October 30, 1973, the son of Judy Lynn Copeland (1953–2018), a single mother who worked two jobs to support him. He has claimed to have never met, or even seen a photograph of, his father. Copeland developed an interest in professional wrestling at a young age. (Note: Copeland's favorite wrestlers included Bret Hart, Hulk Hogan, Shawn Michaels, Mr. Perfect, Randy Savage, and Ricky Steamboat.) At the age of 16, Copeland attended WrestleMania VI at the Toronto SkyDome in 1990, sitting in the 11th row at ringside and cheered for Hulk Hogan who was defending the WWF Championship against Ultimate Warrior in the main event. Copeland has credited that match as the moment he realized he wanted to become a wrestler. He met his friend and fellow future wrestler William Jason "Jay" Reso, known by his ring name Christian Cage, in Orangeville when he was 10 years old. The two would often make trips to Maple Leaf Gardens in Toronto to watch their favourite wrestlers. When Copeland was 17, he won an essay writing contest hosted by his local gym, the prize for which was free wrestling training with Sweet Daddy Siki and Ron Hutchison in Toronto. However, he put his wrestling aspirations aside to help his mother pay the bills, taking numerous jobs and then receiving a diploma in radio broadcasting from Humber College before resuming his wrestling training.

== Professional wrestling career ==
=== Early career (1992–1996) ===
Copeland made his professional wrestling debut on Canada Day 1992, in an event at Monarch Park Stadium in Toronto. Throughout the 1990s, he wrestled on the independent circuit in Ontario and the Great Lakes region of the United States under the ring name Sexton Hardcastle. He became a part of the tag team Sex and Violence with Joe E. Legend. In the mid-1990s, he wrestled as Adam Impact for Tony Condello's Winnipeg promotion. In 1997, Sex and Violence became part of a larger stable called Thug Life, joining Christian Cage, Zakk Wyld, Bill Skullion, and Rhino Richards. During his independent career, he won the MWCW Tag Team Championship twice with Legend and the ICW Street Fight Tag Team Championship twice.

The duo of Hardcastle and Cage were known as Hard Impact before changing their name to the Suicide Blondes. They also worked in Japan under the name The Canadian Rockers. Copeland also wrestled as Damon Striker against Meng on an episode of WCW Pro in February 1996. (Copeland stated in 2021 the name was intended to be "Damien Striker", but the on-screen caption of the name was incorrectly written.) In the summer of 1995, he worked a show in Ajax, Ontario, where Bret Hart's business manager, Carl De Marco, was watching. Impressed, he suggested Copeland send an audition tape to the World Wrestling Federation (WWF).

=== World Wrestling Federation/World Wrestling Entertainment/WWE (1996–2023) ===
==== Early years (1996–1998) ====
On May 10, 1996, Copeland replaced Bob Holly's opponent on short notice in the opening match of a WWF house show as Sexton Hardcastle in Hamilton, Ontario.

In 1996, Copeland initially made $210 per week while working for the WWF without an official contract. The company also paid for his outstanding college debt, which was around $40,000. After a Grand Prix Wrestling tour in the summer of 1997, De Marco urged Copeland to go to Calgary, where Hart was informally training wrestlers while recovering from knee surgery. He spent his tour earnings on a plane ticket and landed with no money or place to stay. He called Johnny Smith, whom he met twice, and Smith agreed to give him food and shelter. Smith also drove Copeland to and from the gym and Hart's house, where he trained alongside Ken Shamrock, Test, Mark Henry and Kurrgan. Copeland returned to the Maritimes for another Grand Prix tour before going back to Hart's house, bringing Christian with him. After this camp, Hart was impressed enough to put in a good word for both men at the WWF.

Copeland received a developmental contract with the WWF in 1997. His first match was on November 10, 1997, in Ottawa, Ontario losing to CFL football star Glen Kulka. The next day in Cornwall, Ontario, he faced and defeated Christian Cage at Shotgun taping in a dark match, this match is included on WWE Home Video's 2008 retrospective, Edge: A Decade of Decadence. From March to June 1998, Copeland appeared in many house shows and dark matches. Upon completing his training, Copeland made his WWF television debut on the June 22, 1998, episode of Raw as Edge. Copeland took the name Edge from an Albany radio station.

Edge's first televised match was on June 16 (aired June 22) against Jose Estrada Jr., which ended prematurely by countout when Edge performed a somersault senton from the ring to the outside, legitimately injuring Estrada's neck. In his first pay-per-view match at SummerSlam on August 30, he served as Sable's mystery tag team partner defeating Jacqueline and Marc Mero, and slammed Sable onto Mero in a pinning position to pick up the win. At Breakdown: In Your House on September 27, Edge faced Owen Hart in a losing effort making it his first loss on WWF TV. On the October 11 edition of Sunday Night Heat, Edge defeated Vader in Vader's final televised WWF match and at WWF Capital Carnage on December 6, Edge faced Tiger Ali Singh in a losing effort.

==== Teaming with Christian (1998–2001) ====
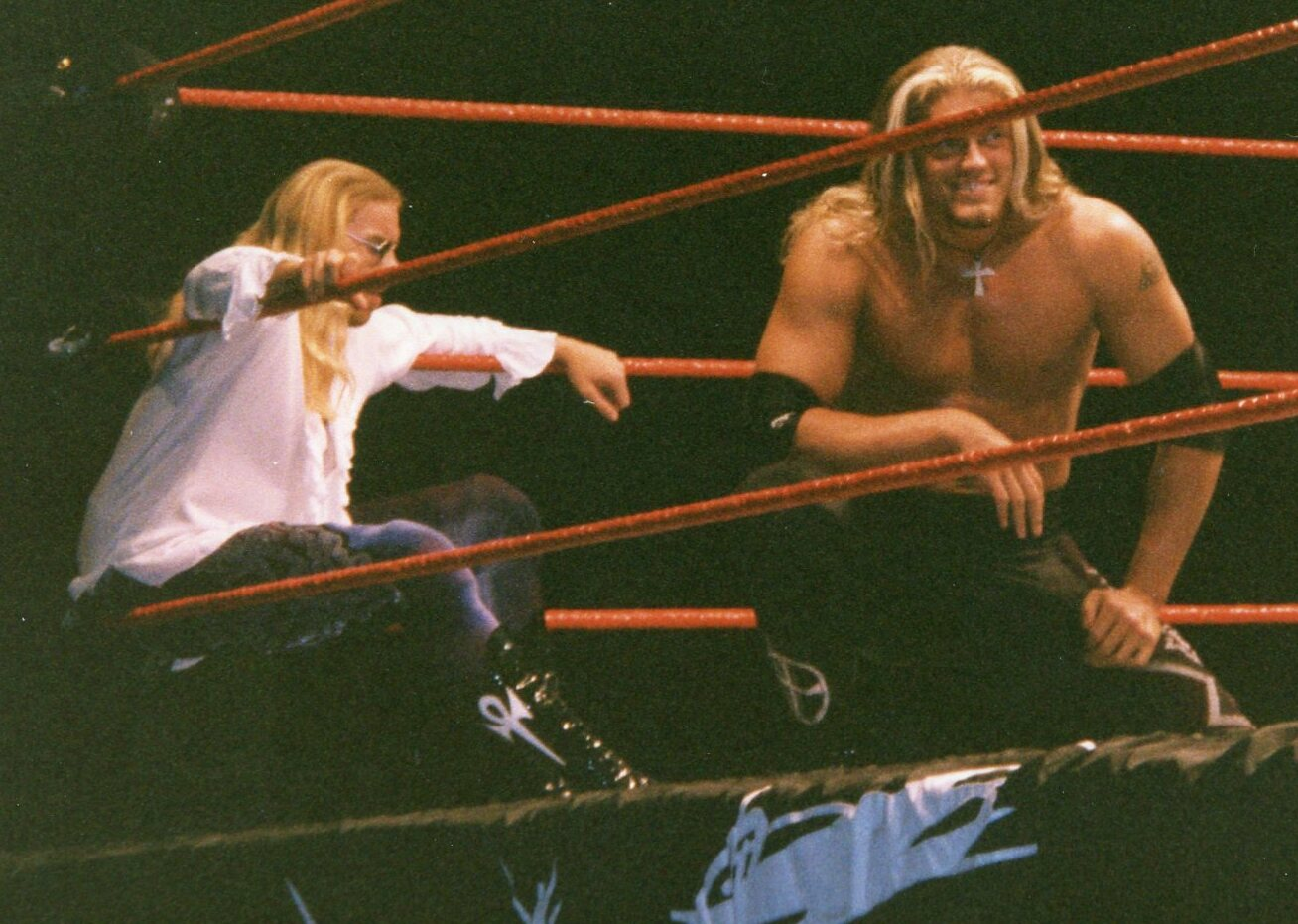
Edge (right) with Christian in their Brood attire, which they used along with gothic symbols, in April 1999

In September, Edge began a feud against the vampire wrestler Gangrel. During the feud, Gangrel introduced Christian, Edge's storyline brother, as his ally. Eventually, Gangrel and Christian convinced Edge to join them, and the three of them formed a stable known as The Brood.

At Rock Bottom: In Your House on December 13, The Brood defeated The J.O.B. Squad in a six-man tag team match. At the Royal Rumble on January 24, 1999, Edge competed in the 30-man Royal Rumble match, being eliminated by Road Dogg. The Brood was later abducted and converted into The Undertaker's Ministry of Darkness. In May, the Brood broke away from the Ministry after Christian was attacked by Ken Shamrock and forced to reveal the location of the captive Stephanie McMahon. The Undertaker chose to have Christian punished for his trespass, but Edge and Gangrel stood by him and betrayed The Undertaker, leading to a brief feud with the Ministry. At Backlash on April 25, the Brood faced Ministry members Bradshaw, Faarooq, and Mideon in a losing effort. At King of the Ring on June 27, The Hardy Boyz defeated Edge and Christian in a match to determine the number one contender to the WWF Tag Team Championship, after their first match on Sunday Night Heat ended in a no-contest.

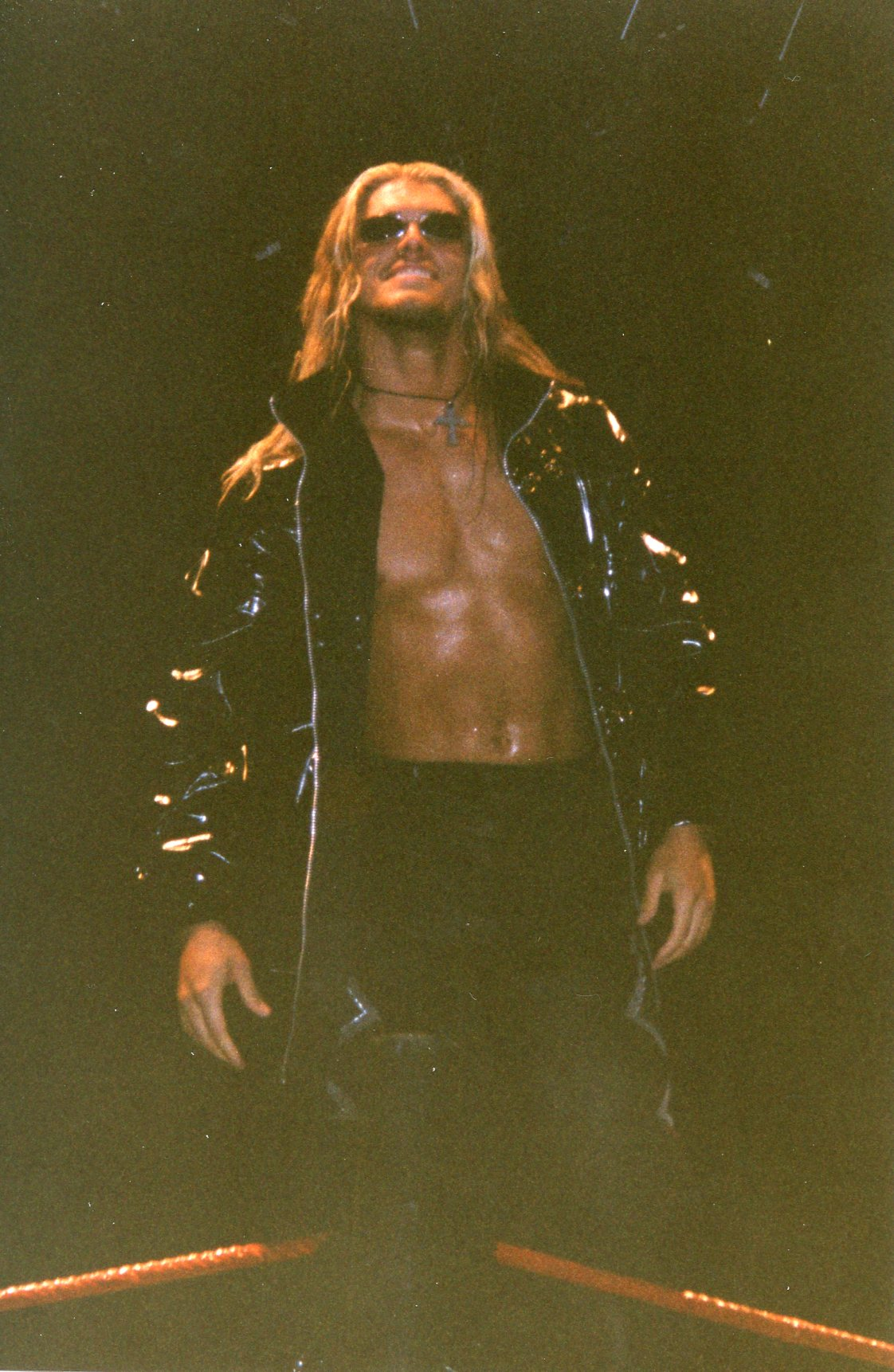
Edge in April 1999

Edge captured his first singles championship, the WWF Intercontinental Championship, on July 24, defeating Jeff Jarrett at a house show in Toronto, Ontario. Interestingly, the match wasn't booked this way. Edge explained in an interview in 2021 with Loudwire: "During the match we did this thing where I pinned [Jeff Jarrett] and the crowd thought I won and then they were gonna reverse it, but then Jack Lanza, who was the road agent at the time, walked out and said, 'Go get your belt.' I went, 'Whaaaa?' We're calling an audible here!" Edge lost the title the next night to Jarrett at Fully Loaded on July 25. At SummerSlam on August 22, Edge and Christian competed in a Tag team turmoil match where they eliminated three teams: The Hardy Boyz, Mideon and Viscera, and Droz and Prince Albert before getting eliminated from the match by The Acolytes. At Unforgiven on September 26, Edge and Christian faced The New Age Outlaws for the WWF Tag Team Championship but failed to win the titles.

Later in the year, Edge was placed in a storyline angle with the Hardy Boyz. Gangrel soon betrayed both Edge and Christian and formed The New Brood with their enemies, The Hardy Boyz. They feuded with the Hardy Boyz, as they went on to compete in a ladder match at No Mercy on October 17 for the "managerial services" of Terri Runnels and $100,000, which the Hardy Boyz won. The match was widely praised and described as the match of the year by various reviewers. At Survivor Series on November 14, Edge and Christian and The Hardy Boyz faced Too Cool and The Hollys in a four-on-four Survivor Series elimination match where they lost. At Armageddon on December 12, Edge and Christian competed in an 8-team battle royal which was won by The Acolytes. At the Royal Rumble on January 23, 2000, Edge competed in the Royal Rumble match where he was eliminated by Al Snow and Val Venis. Edge and Christian began a Heel turn At No Way Out on February 27, Edge and Christian defeated The Hardy Boyz in a tag team match to determine the number one contenders to the WWF Tag Team Championship. At WrestleMania 2000 on April 2, Edge and Christian defeated the Hardy Boyz and the Dudley Boyz to win the WWF Tag Team Championship in a Triangle Ladder match, which ultimately led to the creation of the Tables, Ladders, and Chairs match.

Edge performing a "five-second pose" at King of the Ring in June 2000

At Backlash on April 30, Edge and Christian defeated D-Generation X to retain the titles. At Judgment Day on May 21, Edge, Christian and Kurt Angle lost a six-man tag team match to Rikishi and Too Cool. Soon after, they lost the tag titles to Too Cool but won them back in a Four corners elimination match at King of the Ring on June 25. At Fully Loaded on July 23, they defended the titles against The Acolytes Protection Agency where they got disqualified but retained the titles. After retaining the titles at SummerSlam on August 27, at Unforgiven on September 24, Edge and Christian defended the titles against The Hardy Boyz in a steel cage match where they lost the titles and were not allowed another title shot. At No Mercy on October 22, Edge and Christian, masked as Los Conquistadores, defeated The Hardys for the titles. The next night on Raw, the Hardy Boyz dressed as the Los Conquistadores and defeated Edge in a handicap match after Christian was taken out backstage to regain the WWF Tag Team Championship.

At Survivor Series on November 19, Edge and Christian teamed with Right to Censor's Bull Buchanan and The Goodfather in a four-on-four Survivor Series elimination match, where they lost to The Dudley Boyz and The Hardy Boyz, They regained the tag titles at Armageddon on December 10 in a fatal four-way match, but lost them eight days later to The Rock and The Undertaker. They won them back three days later on SmackDown! thanks to special guest referee Kurt Angle. During Edge and Christian's run as a tag team, they also competed as a team in the first three TLC matches, winning the first two over The Dudley Boyz and The Hardy Boyz, at SummerSlam in 2000 and then again at WrestleMania X-Seven. At the Royal Rumble on January 21, 2001, Edge and Christian were defeated by the Dudley Boyz and lost the tag team titles. They unsuccessfully attempted to regain the tag team title at No Way Out on February 25 against the Dudley Boyz and The Brothers of Destruction, but they succeeded at WrestleMania X-Seven on April 1 against the Dudley Boyz and The Hardyz in the second TLC match. At Judgment Day on May 20, Edge and Christian competed in a Tag Team Turmoil match which was won by Chris Jericho and Chris Benoit. Days later on the May 24 SmackDown!, Edge and Christian competed in a Fatal 4-Way Tag Team TLC Match for the WWF Tag Team Championship where Benoit and Jericho retained the titles.

==== Championship reigns and various feuds (2001–2003) ====
Edge solidified himself as an emerging singles competitor by winning the 2001 King of the Ring tournament and slowly becoming a fan favourite by siding with the WWF during the Invasion storyline. Christian betrayed Edge shortly afterward, and the two feuded over Edge's Intercontinental Championship (which he won at SummerSlam on August 19) that he later lost to Christian at Unforgiven on September 23, though Edge later captured the title in a ladder match at No Mercy on October 21.

Edge lost the Intercontinental Championship to Test on the November 5 episode of Raw and shortly afterwards won the WCW United States Championship from Kurt Angle on the November 12 episode of Raw. Edge defeated Test at Survivor Series on November 18 to regain the Intercontinental Championship which he unified with the United States Championship. From there, Edge was placed in a feud with William Regal for the Intercontinental Championship. Edge first defeated Regal at Vengeance on December 9 to retain the championship: however, he lost the title to Regal at the Royal Rumble on January 20, 2002, and then his rematch against Regal at No Way Out on February 17 in a Brass Knuckles on a Pole match. At WrestleMania X8 on March 17, Edge defeated Booker T in a match that was the result of Edge beating out Booker T for a fictitious Japanese shampoo endorsement. Shortly after defeating Booker T at WrestleMania, Edge was drafted to the SmackDown! brand in the first WWF Draft Lottery. During this time, Edge also gained Never Gonna Stop (The Red Red Kroovy) by Rob Zombie as his new entrance theme.

Upon arriving there, he began a feud with Kurt Angle. At Backlash on April 21, Angle defeated Edge which later culminated in Edge shaving Angle's head following a hair vs. hair match at Judgment Day on May 19. On the May 30 episode of SmackDown!, Edge defeated Angle in a steel cage match to end the feud. During the match, Edge speared Angle from the top rope, injuring his own arm and forcing himself out of action for a month. Two months later, he won the WWE Tag Team Championship alongside Hollywood Hulk Hogan on the July 4 episode of SmackDown! by defeating Billy and Chuck. Edge and Hogan lost the titles at Vengeance on July 21 to The Un-Americans (Lance Storm and Christian), and at SummerSlam on August 25, Edge defeated Eddie Guerrero then lost to Guerrero at Unforgiven on September 22. They met one final time days later on SmackDown! in a No Disqualification match where Edge won, ending the feud. He then formed a tag team with Rey Mysterio, and the two participated in a tournament for the newly created and SmackDown! exclusive WWE Tag Team Championship. They lost to Kurt Angle and Chris Benoit in the finals of the tournament at No Mercy on October 20; the match was voted Match of the Year by the Wrestling Observer Newsletter. After they failed in winning the titles, Mysterio and Edge defeated Los Guerreros in a number one contender's match on the October 24 episode of SmackDown! to earn a title shot. At the Rebellion pay-per-view on October 26, Edge faced Brock Lesnar and Paul Heyman in a Handicap match for the WWE Championship where Lesnar retained the title after Lesnar pinned Edge. On the November 7 episode of SmackDown!, Edge and Mysterio defeated Angle and Benoit in a two out-of-three falls match to win the WWE Tag Team Championship. They soon lost the tag titles to Los Guerreros in a triple threat elimination match that also involved former champions Angle and Benoit at Survivor Series on November 17.

After losing the title, Edge and Mysterio went their separate ways to focus on their singles careers. At the Royal Rumble, Edge competed in the 30-man Royal Rumble match on January 19, 2003, where he had three eliminations before getting eliminated by Chris Jericho. Edge then teamed up with Chris Benoit, facing Team Angle in a series of singles and tag team matches. Prior to No Way Out, Edge suffered a legitimate neck injury, rendering him unable to compete in his scheduled match. The injury stemmed from a bump he took on a closed ladder on the September 26, 2002, edition of SmackDown! while wrestling Eddie Guerrero, who then frog-splashed him while he was still laying on the ladder. His arms would then numb more and more in the following months before deciding to have the surgery, as he was gradually in more pain and did not want to risk dropping an opponent dangerously because of his numb arms. At No Way Out on February 23, Edge was written off television through a backstage attack. He then underwent surgery with Dr. Lloyd Youngblood and was sidelined for over a year.

==== World championship pursuits (2004–2005) ====
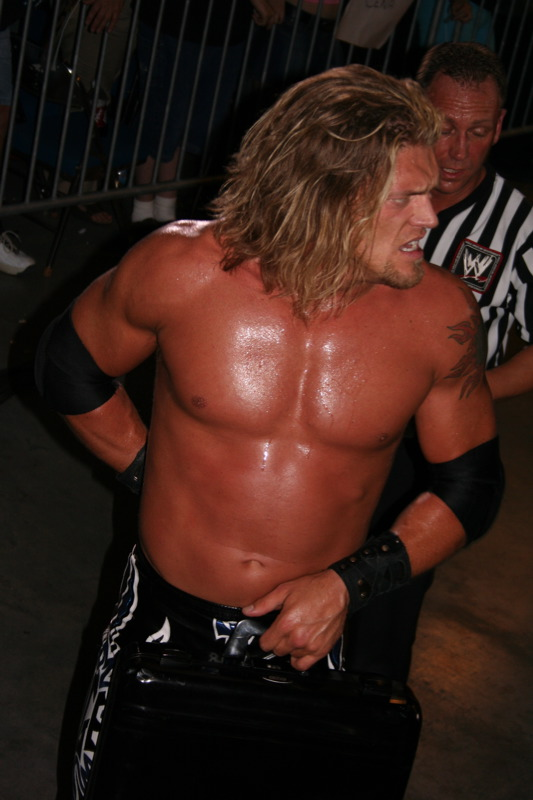
Edge in 2005 with the Money In The Bank briefcase

Edge was drafted to the Raw brand in the 2004 WWE draft lottery on the March 22, 2004, episode of Raw, where he speared Eric Bischoff and returned to in-ring action shortly after the event. At Backlash on April 18, Edge defeated Kane, and on the April 19 episode of Raw, he and World Heavyweight Champion Chris Benoit won the World Tag Team Championship from Batista and Ric Flair. They continued a close partnership even after losing the title; at Bad Blood on June 13, Edge and Benoit defeated La Résistance (who defeated them for the titles on the May 31 episode of Raw) in a match for the World Tag Team Championship by disqualification but did not win the titles. The team disbanded when Edge won the Intercontinental Championship at Vengeance on July 11 defeating Randy Orton, thus becoming a five time Intercontinental Champion. At SummerSlam on August 15, Edge defeated Chris Jericho and Batista in a triple threat match to retain the Intercontinental Championship, while controversially getting booed in his own hometown of Toronto despite being a face. Following a legitimate groin injury in a non-televised match, Raw General Manager Eric Bischoff stripped Edge of the Intercontinental title on the September 6 episode of Raw.

Upon his return, Edge began to pursue the World Heavyweight Championship. Edge, Chris Benoit, and Shawn Michaels received a title shot for Triple H's World Heavyweight Championship at Taboo Tuesday on October 19. Michaels won the audience vote to receive the title shot, giving Edge and Benoit a tag team title shot against La Résistance. They regained the titles. During the match, an angry Edge abandoned Benoit and instead interfered in the World Heavyweight Championship match, costing Michaels the championship. On the November 1 episode of Raw, Edge and Benoit lost the World Tag Team Championship back to La Résistance with Edge abandoning Benoit again and sitting in a chair and watching the match. After the conclusion of the match, Edge attacked Benoit, turning heel for the first time since 2001. Edge also gained a new entrance theme, Metalingus, performed by the then-newly established band, Alter Bridge. At Survivor Series on November 14, Edge was part of Team Triple H along with Triple H, Batista, and Gene Snitsky. They were defeated by Team Orton (Randy Orton, Chris Benoit, Chris Jericho, and Maven). During the match, Edge eliminated both Benoit and Jericho before getting eliminated by Orton.

On the November 29 episode of Raw, both Edge and Benoit competed in a number one contender's battle royal, but they eliminated each other simultaneously at the conclusion of the match, resulting in a draw. As a result, Triple H was forced to defend the title in a triple threat match. In the match, Benoit locked the Crippler Crossface on Edge, who shifted his weight putting Benoit's shoulders on the mat for a pin. This match also ended in a draw for Benoit and Edge, as Benoit made Edge submit at the same time the referee counted a pinfall for Edge. As a result, the World Heavyweight title was vacated the following week on Raw. On January 9, 2005, Edge competed in his first Elimination Chamber match at New Year's Revolution for the vacant World Heavyweight Championship. Special guest referee Shawn Michaels performed a superkick on Edge, in retaliation for an accidental spear by Edge, causing Edge to be the first eliminated. This led to a match at the Royal Rumble on January 30, in which Edge defeated Michaels. Edge also competed in the Royal Rumble match later that night, where he lasted until the final three but was eliminated by eventual winner Batista and John Cena.

==== Alliance with Lita and WWE Champion (2005–2006) ====
At WrestleMania 21 on April 3, Edge won the first ever Money in the Bank ladder match, gaining a contract that gave him a shot at the World Heavyweight Championship within one year. According to a podcast interview with Chris Jericho, Copeland said that he did not initially like the idea of the ladder match and even told WWE management not to include him on the WrestleMania 21 card altogether. However, he was talked into competing by the other participants like Jericho and Kane who said the match had the potential to be a big success. At Backlash on May 1, Edge defeated Chris Benoit in a Last Man Standing match to end the feud. Several weeks after, Edge was then paired with Lita, his real-life girlfriend at the time, in an angle in which she betrayed her storyline husband Kane, by costing him the Gold Rush tournament finals match to determine the number-one contender for the World Heavyweight Championship on the May 16 episode of Raw. The next week, Edge received his World Heavyweight Championship match against Batista, which he lost. Edge started a feud with Kane leading to several matches between them including one at Vengeance on June 26, when Edge lost to Kane. After trading several victories on Raw, the feud ended in a stretcher match on the July 25 episode of Raw that Edge won, but shortly after, Kane performed a tombstone piledriver on Lita and later abducted her in an ambulance.

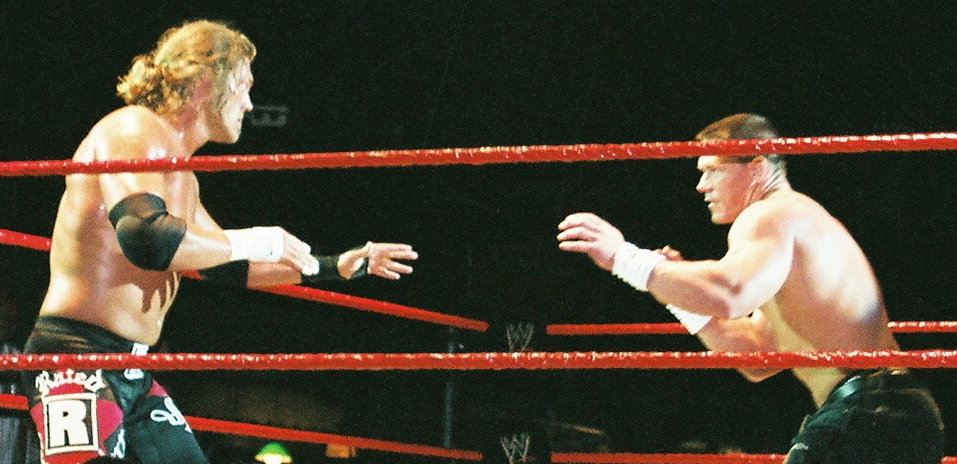
Edge facing off against John Cena during a WWE house show in 2006

On the July 11 episode of Raw, Edge's match with Kane was interrupted when Matt Hardy made a surprise appearance. Hardy referred to Edge by his real name and issued a threat to Lita as well. When Hardy was officially brought back to Raw, he and Edge continued their feud, including a match at SummerSlam on August 21 where Edge defeated Hardy by referee stoppage, after causing Hardy to have excessive blood loss. The next night on Raw, after a match Hardy had with Rob Conway, Edge then appeared and overpowered Hardy. He then wedged Hardy's head between the steel steps and the ringpost, and then kicked the steel steps into Hardy's head. On the August 29 episode of Raw, Edge and Hardy fought in a Street Fight, which resulted in a no contest when Hardy performed a side effect on Edge off the entrance ramp into the sound speakers and other electrical equipment. They also fought in a Steel cage match at Unforgiven on September 18 in which Hardy defeated Edge. The feud culminated in a Loser Leaves Raw ladder match on Raw Homecoming on October 3, which Edge won. After the match, Hardy left the Raw brand to go to the SmackDown! brand, while Edge suffered a legit torn pectoralis major muscle that kept him shelved for a couple of months. During his time off, he starred in his own talk show segment on Raw entitled The Cutting Edge, dubbing himself the "Rated-R Superstar". Edge used his talk show to start a feud with Ric Flair following Flair's well-publicized arrest in connection with a road rage incident. Edge eventually began using The Cutting Edge as a soapbox to run down Flair until, after weeks of public mockery, Flair eventually showed up and attacked Edge. Edge and Flair formally met at the New Year's Revolution event on January 8, 2006, in a match for Flair's Intercontinental Championship, which resulted in Flair retaining after Edge was disqualified.

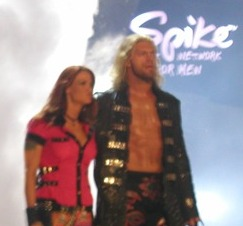
Edge and Lita in July 2005

Although Edge had lost his scheduled match at New Year's Revolution, that would not be his only match that evening as the main event saw John Cena, the reigning WWE Champion, defend his title in an Elimination Chamber match. After a bloody Cena won the match, WWE chairman Vince McMahon revealed that Edge was cashing in his Money in the Bank contract to face Cena for the championship immediately. After two spears, Edge quickly defeated Cena to win the WWE Championship, marking his first world title win.

The following night on Raw, Edge decided to celebrate his victory by having "hot, unbridled sex" in the middle of the ring. He and Lita engaged in foreplay until they were interrupted by Flair, who called Edge a disgrace and "that he was horrible in the sack". Flair, however, ended up on the receiving end of a con-chair-to on the announcers' table until Cena came out to Flair's aid and performed an FU on Lita. The "Live Sex Celebration" segment earned Raw a 5.2 rating, the highest Raw rating in over a year, leading Edge to call himself the "most watched champion ever". On the January 16 episode of Raw, Edge defeated Ric Flair in a TLC match to retain the WWE Championship. At the Royal Rumble on January 29, Edge lost the WWE Championship back to Cena.

Edge then lost a rematch on the February 16 episode of Raw and blamed special guest referee Mick Foley for his loss. They feuded until WrestleMania 22 on April 2, where Edge defeated Foley in a hardcore match by Spearing him through a flaming table but suffered second degree burns, thanks to anti-flame material not being applied to the table, at both wrestlers' request. According to Copeland, the match with Foley proved him as a main eventer. After losing a triple threat match at Backlash for the WWE Championship, Edge teamed with Foley, pointing as Hardcore Champions. At ECW One Night Stand on June 11, Edge, Foley and Lita defeated Dreamer, Terry Funk and Beulah McGillicutty in an Extreme Rules tag team match. Later in the event, Edge interfered in the WWE Championship match between John Cena and challenger Rob Van Dam, helping Van Dam win the title after he speared Cena through a table.

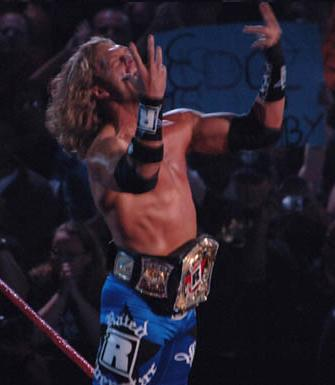
Edge, pictured with his custom "Rated-R" Spinner belt, at Unforgiven during his second WWE Championship reign

While Edge lost a match for the WWE title at Vengeance on June 25, he won the championship on the July 3 episode of Raw during a triple threat match. This angle re-ignited Edge's feud with Cena, retaining the title against him at SummerSlam on August 20. The night after SummerSlam, Lita disposed of Cena's customized "spinner" belt into the Long Island Sound and he unveiled the new "Rated-R" version of the belt. Edge lost the title to Cena in a TLC match at Unforgiven on September 17, a PPV that took place in Edge's hometown of Toronto.

==== Rated-RKO (2006–2007) ====
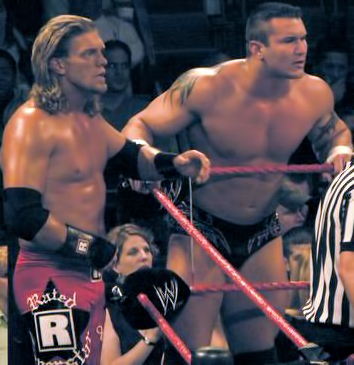
Edge tagging with Randy Orton as Rated-RKO in 2006

On the October 2 episode of Raw, interference from the newly reformed D-Generation X (DX) (Triple H and Shawn Michaels) cost Edge his "final chance" at John Cena's WWE Championship in a Steel cage match, though their interference was a response to the interference of Lance Cade and Trevor Murdoch. It led to Edge approaching Randy Orton and asking him to join forces to defeat DX, which Orton accepted and joined an alliance with Edge. The two formed the tag team Rated-RKO. At Cyber Sunday on November 5, Rated-RKO defeated DX with Eric Bischoff as the special guest referee. On the November 13 episode of Raw, Rated-RKO defeated Ric Flair and Roddy Piper to win the World Tag Team Championship, making Edge a record eleven-time tag team champion. At Survivor Series on November 26, Rated-RKO teamed with Johnny Nitro, Mike Knox and Gregory Helms to face Team DX (Triple H, Shawn Michaels, CM Punk, Matt Hardy and Jeff Hardy) in a Survivor Series match, but lost when all members of Team Rated-RKO were eliminated in a clean sweep. Also that month, Lita retired, and her on-screen relationship with Edge abruptly ended, with no explanation.

As part of the storyline angle, Rated-RKO attacked Ric Flair with steel chairs to enrage DX on the November 27 episode of Raw. At New Year's Revolution on January 7, 2007, Rated-RKO defended the World Tag Team Championship against DX, but the match was declared a no-contest when Triple H suffered a legitimate injury during the match. At the Royal Rumble on January 28, Edge competed in the 30-man Royal Rumble match where he lasted the longest in the match with a time of 44 minutes, eliminating 5 men and making it to the final 4 in the match before getting eliminated by Shawn Michaels. With Triple H out of action, the team continued their on-screen rivalry with remaining DX member Shawn Michaels. Michaels teamed with John Cena to defeat Rated-RKO for the World Tag Team Championship on January 29, 2007. Edge and Orton suffered a series of losses to Cena and Michaels in the following months. Edge competed in the Money in the Bank ladder match at WrestleMania 23 on April 1 in a losing effort. During the match, Matt Hardy threw him onto a ladder and encouraged Jeff Hardy, who was close to the winning briefcase, to finish him off. Hardy then leaped off the 20-foot-high (6.1 m) ladder, and drove him through the ladder with a leg drop, seemingly injuring both Edge and himself. The two were unable to continue the match and were removed from ringside on stretchers. After this Edge and Orton also became rivals in their goals of achieving the WWE Championship. Neither Edge nor Orton won the championship, and they lost their claims as number one contenders after a failed match with Cena at Backlash on April 29.

==== La Familia (2007–2009) ====
After WrestleMania, it was revealed that the winner of the 2007 Money in the Bank contract, Mr. Kennedy, suffered an injury, so WWE booked Edge to defeat him for the briefcase on the May 7 episode of Raw. Edge thus became the first person to gain the Money in the Bank contract twice and the first not to do so in the ladder match. He cashed the briefcase four days later on SmackDown! against the World Heavyweight Champion The Undertaker after he retained the title against Batista in a steel cage match and was attacked by Mark Henry. As a result, Edge became a member of the SmackDown! roster. Edge then retained the title against Batista at Judgment Day on May 20, One Night Stand on June 3 in a steel cage match, and Vengeance on June 24 in a last chance match, though he did lose to Batista in a non-title match on the June 29, 2007, episode of SmackDown!, to end the feud. Edge then began a feud with Kane after SmackDown! General Manager Theodore Long announced Kane as the new number one contender for the World Heavyweight Championship at The Great American Bash on July 22. Edge was forced to relinquish the World Heavyweight Championship due to a legitimately torn left pectoral muscle on the July 20 episode of SmackDown!.

Edge alongside Curt Hawkins and Zack Ryder, three principal members of La Familia

On November 18, at Survivor Series, Edge made his return, interfering in a World Heavyweight Championship Hell in a Cell match between Batista and The Undertaker, helping Batista win the match. The following SmackDown! show saw Edge and General Manager Vickie Guerrero make their relationship public, making his official in-ring return in a World Heavyweight Championship match against Batista on the November 30 episode of SmackDown!, a match that ended after The Undertaker interfered. At Armageddon on December 16, Edge won his second World Heavyweight Championship, after giving The Undertaker two chair shots and pinning the defending champion Batista (who had been Tombstoned by The Undertaker prior) in a Triple Threat match. During the match, the Major Brothers, who looked similar to Edge, distracted Batista and Undertaker.

As a champion, a stable was created, which included The Major Brothers, repackaged as Curt Hawkins and Zack Ryder, Chavo Guerrero, Vickie Guerrero and Bam Neely, being known as La Familia (Spanish for "The Family"). Edge then successfully defended the World Heavyweight Championship over Rey Mysterio at the Royal Rumble on January 27, 2008 and again at No Way Out on February 17.

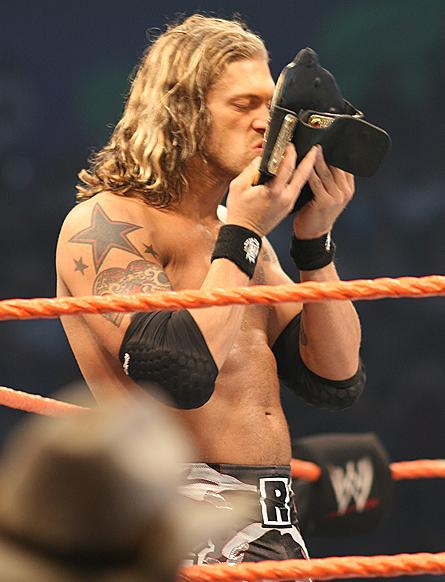
Edge before facing Undertaker at WrestleMania XXIV in 2008

At WrestleMania XXIV on March 30, Edge lost the World Heavyweight Championship to The Undertaker when he tapped out to the Hell's Gate. The match was booked for Edge to retain and break the Undertaker's streak, but Edge refused to win the match. In a WrestleMania rematch, The Undertaker defeated Edge once again at Backlash on April 27 to retain the World Heavyweight Championship. Following Backlash, The Undertaker was stripped of the World Heavyweight Championship by Vickie Guerrero for using the Hell's Gate, which she previously banned. After winning a tournament to determine who would face The Undertaker for the vacant championship, the two met at Judgment Day on May 18, which ended in Edge losing via countout. However, since championships cannot change hands via countout, no champion was crowned. A rematch was scheduled for One Night Stand on June 1, in a TLC match. On the May 23 episode of SmackDown, Vickie Guerrero added a stipulation that stated if The Undertaker were to lose, he would be kayfabe banished from the WWE. At One Night Stand, Edge defeated The Undertaker, winning the World Heavyweight Championship for the third time.

On June 29, Edge retained his championship against Batista at Night of Champions, after interference from La Familia. The next night on Raw, Edge appeared to gloat that two of the top championships were on SmackDown, as WWE Champion Triple H was drafted to SmackDown in the WWE draft earlier that week. A vengeful Batista then appeared and incapacitated Edge with the Batista Bomb. Just as Batista was leaving, CM Punk ran to the ring carrying his Money in the Bank briefcase, with referee in tow, who then cashed in the briefcase. Edge, who was still knocked down from the attack by Batista, was easily pinned by Punk after a Go To Sleep, losing the World Heavyweight Championship. Due to this win, the championship became exclusive to the Raw brand.

On the July 4 episode of SmackDown, Edge took his frustrations out on Vickie because he lost the title and told her the wedding was off. The following week, however, after Guerrero saved Edge from a con-chair-to by The Big Show, Edge re-proposed, and the wedding was back on. On the July 18 episode of SmackDown, at the wedding reception, Triple H came out and showed a video of Edge cheating on Guerrero the day before with the wedding planner, Alicia Fox. At The Great American Bash on July 20, Edge faced Triple H for the WWE Championship in a losing effort. Edge attempted to apologize to Guerrero, but she revealed to him that she had rehired The Undertaker and that Edge would face him in a Hell in a Cell match at SummerSlam on August 17. Edge then turned on La Familia during the August 8 episode of SmackDown, performing a one-man con-chair-to on Chavo Guerrero in the ring, and tossed Vickie out of her wheelchair, effectively disbanding the faction. At SummerSlam, The Undertaker defeated Edge, and after the match, The Undertaker chokeslammed Edge off the top of a ladder and through the ring canvas, with flames rising from the hole.

Edge celebrating after winning his fourth WWE Championship in January 2009

On November 23, at Survivor Series, Edge returned to WWE after an introduction by SmackDown General Manager and his on-screen wife Vickie Guerrero, replacing Jeff Hardy in the Triple Threat match for the WWE Championship involving champion Triple H and Vladimir Kozlov. He pinned Triple H to become the WWE Champion for the third time in his career. Edge lost the title to Hardy at Armageddon on December 14 in a triple threat match, which also featured Triple H. At the Royal Rumble on January 25, 2009, however, Edge regained the title in a no disqualification match, following Matt Hardy's interference. At No Way Out on February 15, Edge lost the WWE Championship in an Elimination Chamber match after being pinned by Jeff Hardy, being the first to be eliminated, with the title eventually being won by Triple H. Later that night, Edge inserted himself into the World Heavyweight Championship Elimination Chamber match after attacking Kofi Kingston and barricading himself inside one of the chamber's pods, proceeding to win his fourth World Heavyweight Championship, last eliminating Rey Mysterio and taking the title over to SmackDown. At WrestleMania 25 on April 5, Edge lost the championship to John Cena in a Triple Threat match, which also included Big Show (causing the title to go back to Raw), but regained the championship for a fifth time at Backlash on April 26, when he defeated Cena in a Last Man Standing match, after interference by Big Show, bringing the title back to SmackDown. After a successful defense against Jeff Hardy at Judgment Day on May 17, he lost the title to Hardy at Extreme Rules on June 7 in a ladder match. While Hardy was celebrating, CM Punk cashed in his Money in the Bank and defeated Hardy to win the World Heavyweight Championship. The following night on Raw, Guerrero resigned as the Raw General Manager due to being humiliated, and Edge came out to apologize. Instead, however, he confessed he married Guerrero only because she had authoritative powers as the General Manager, and sought a divorce. On the June 15 episode of Raw, Edge received his rematch for the World Heavyweight Championship in a triple threat match against both Hardy and Punk, but was pinned by Punk.

Edge won the Unified WWE Tag Team Championship (the unified version of the World Tag Team Championship from the Raw brand and the WWE Tag Team Championship from the SmackDown brand) with Chris Jericho at The Bash on June 28 after he and Jericho were inserted into what was originally a match between reigning champions The Colóns and Legacy. The win made Edge a record-setting 12 time World Tag Team Champion. On July 3, Edge suffered a torn Achilles tendon while competing at a live event in San Diego in a match against Jeff Hardy, and later underwent surgery. It was reported that he could be out of action for up to a year. During Edge's absence, Jericho replaced him with Big Show (forming Jeri-Show) and Jericho began to speak badly of Edge, mocking him for his injury.

==== Record-breaking World Heavyweight Champion (2010–2011) ====
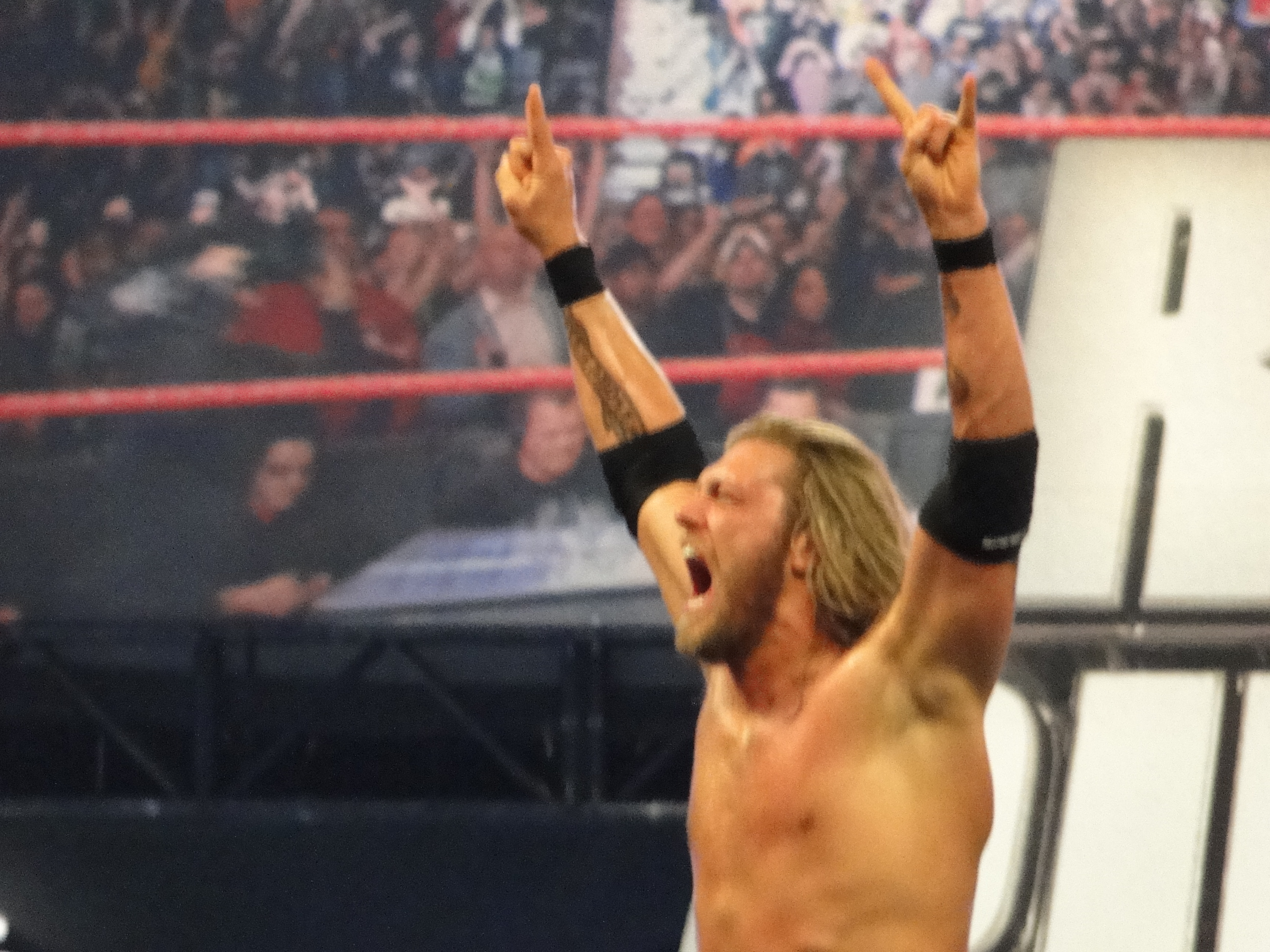
Edge after winning the Royal Rumble in January 2010

At the Royal Rumble pay-per-view event on January 31, 2010, Edge returned from injury by entering the Royal Rumble match as the twenty-ninth surprise entrant, where he won the Royal Rumble match for the first time in his career, after last eliminating John Cena. At Elimination Chamber on February 21, after Chris Jericho won the World Heavyweight Championship, Edge challenged Jericho for the World Heavyweight Championship at WrestleMania XXVI after a surprise attack on Jericho, turning face for the first time since 2004. At WrestleMania on March 28, Edge failed to win the title. Edge defeated Jericho in a steel cage match at Extreme Rules on April 25, ending their feud.

On April 26, as part of the 2010 WWE draft, Edge was drafted to the Raw brand, where he turned heel and began a feud with Randy Orton. Edge and Orton met in a match at the Over the Limit pay-per-view on May 23, with the match resulting in a double countout. At Fatal 4-Way on June 20, Edge participated in a fatal four-way match that also included Orton, John Cena, and Sheamus for the WWE Championship, though Edge failed to win the title. Edge then participated in the Raw Money in the Bank ladder match at the Money in the Bank pay-per-view on July 18, but failed to win the briefcase, as it was won by The Miz. Edge then went on to participate in the main event of SummerSlam on August 15 in a seven-on-seven elimination tag team match against The Nexus. Although he was eliminated by Heath Slater, his team was victorious. At Night of Champions on September 19, Edge participated in a six-pack elimination challenge for the WWE Championship, but once again failed to win the title.

On October 4, he was traded back to SmackDown for CM Punk, turning face once again. On the October 15 episode of SmackDown, he defeated Dolph Ziggler to become part of Team SmackDown at Bragging Rights. At Bragging Rights on October 24, Edge won the match for Team SmackDown alongside Rey Mysterio, eliminating R-Truth, John Morrison and The Miz. He also won his sixth World Heavyweight Championship at TLC: Tables, Ladders & Chairs on December 19 in a four-way Tables, Ladders, and Chairs match.

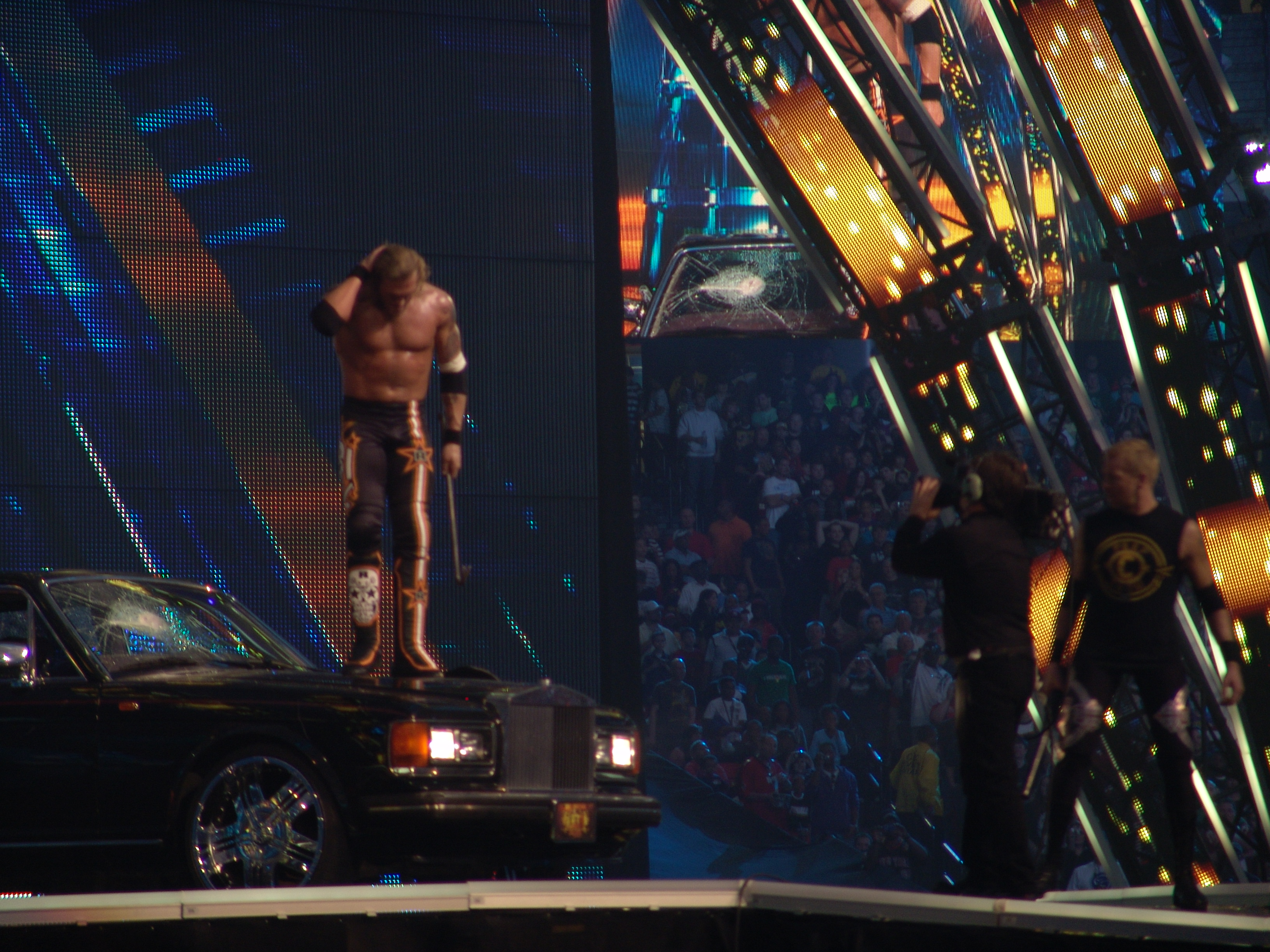
Edge destroying Alberto Del Rio's car after their match at WrestleMania XXVII

At the Royal Rumble on January 30, Edge successfully defended his World Heavyweight Championship against Dolph Ziggler. On the 600th episode of SmackDown on February 18, Edge was stripped from the title by General Manager Vickie Guerrero, but regained it from Dolph Ziggler the same night. At the Elimination Chamber pay-per-view on February 20, Edge successfully defended his World Heavyweight Championship in an Elimination Chamber match by finally pinning Rey Mysterio. After he won the match, he was attacked by Royal Rumble winner Alberto Del Rio, but was saved by the returning Christian. Edge and Christian briefly reunited to defeat Del Rio and his bodyguard Brodus Clay on the March 11 episode of SmackDown. At WrestleMania XXVII on April 3, Edge successfully defended the World Heavyweight Championship against Del Rio.

==== First retirement and WWE Hall of Famer (2011–2019) ====
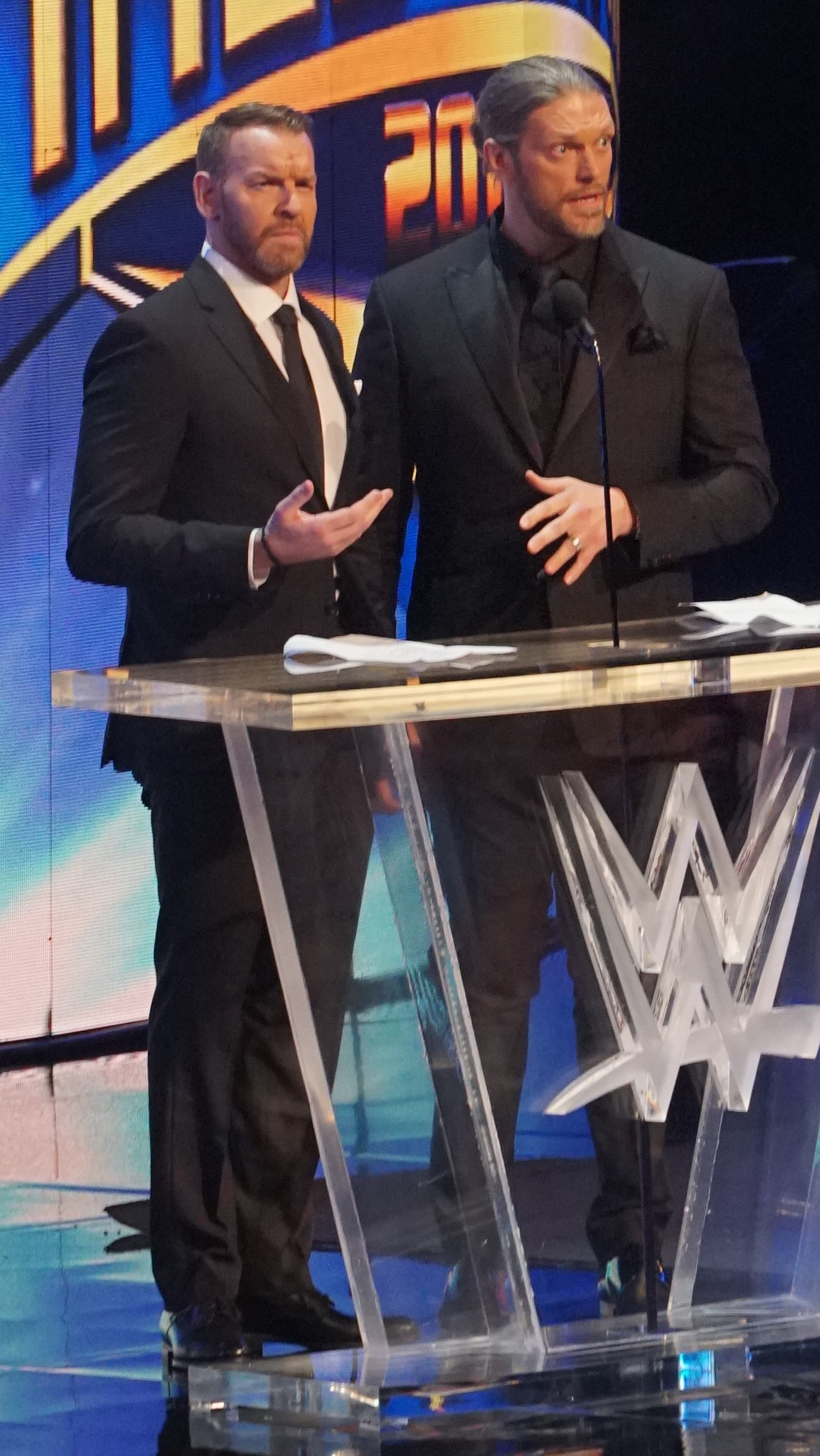
Edge and Christian inducting The Dudley Boyz to the Hall Of Fame 2018

On the April 11 episode of Raw, Edge announced his retirement since he was diagnosed as cervical spinal stenosis, and doctors would not clear him to compete, for risk of neck-down paralysis or even death should he take a hard enough fall. Later that same week, on the April 15 episode of SmackDown, Edge officially relinquished the World Heavyweight Championship. Edge appeared during Christian's matches for the World Heavyweight Championship at Extreme Rules and SummerSlam.

Between 2011 and 2019, Edge made appearances on Raw and SmackDown, sometimes hosting his interview segment The Cutting Edge.

Edge also participated in the WWE Hall of Fame ceremonies: he was inducteed in the 2012 ceremony and inducteed with Christian the Dudley Boyz in the 2018 ceremony. At the SummerSlam pay-per-view event on August 11, 2019, Edge interrupted Elias' performance and performed a spear on him, engaging in physical wrestling for the first time since his retirement.

==== In-ring return and Universal Championship pursuits (2020–2022) ====
Edge made his in-ring return at the 2020 Royal Rumble on January 26, entering the Men's Royal Rumble match, but was eliminated by Roman Reigns. He started a feud with Randy Orton, defeating him in a Last Man Standing match at WrestleMania 36 but being defeated at Backlash on June 14. During the match, Edge suffered a torn triceps and it was reported that the injury would sideline him for four to eight months. After a seven-month hiatus, Edge returned and won the 2021 Royal Rumble match, after entering first, by last eliminating Orton. With this victory, Edge became the eighth man to win the Royal Rumble match twice, the third to win it from the number one position, and the first to win it after being inducted into the WWE Hall of Fame. The following night on Raw, Edge, with the help of Alexa Bliss, defeated Orton to end their feud.

Edge participated in a triple threat match at WrestleMania 37 which include the WWE Universal Champion Roman Reigns and Daniel Bryan, where Reigns retained the title. Edge faced Reigns for the title again at Money in the Bank, but was defeated again due to interference from Seth Rollins. This led to a match between Edge and Rollins at SummerSlam, which Edge won. As part of the 2021 Draft, Edge was drafted to the Raw brand. Edge defeated Rollins again in a Hell in a Cell match at Crown Jewel, ending their feud. Edge returned on the November 29 episode of Raw, where he was confronted by The Miz. The following week on Raw, after another heated verbal exchange between the two during a Miz TV segment, Miz challenged Edge to a match at Day 1, with Edge accepting. At Day 1 on January 1, 2022, Edge defeated Miz with help from his wife, Beth Phoenix. At Royal Rumble on January 29, Edge and his wife Beth Phoenix defeated The Miz and Maryse in a mixed tag team match.

==== The Judgment Day, final feuds and departure (2022–2023) ====
On the February 21 episode of Raw, Edge reflected on all the WrestleMania moments in his career and then he issued an open challenge for WrestleMania 38. The following week on Raw, his challenge was accepted by AJ Styles, but Edge viciously attacked him, turning heel for the first time since 2010. In the buildup to WrestleMania, Edge debuted a new gimmick and a new entrance theme, "The Other Side" by Alter Bridge. On the second night of WrestleMania 38 on April 3, Edge defeated Styles following a distraction by Damian Priest. Edge formed a faction with Priest named The Judgment Day. At WrestleMania Backlash on May 8, Edge defeated Styles with the help of Rhea Ripley, who became the newest member of The Judgment Day. At Hell in a Cell on June 5, The Judgment Day defeated Styles, Finn Bálor and Liv Morgan in a six-person mixed tag team match. The next night on Raw, Edge introduced Bálor as the newest member of The Judgment Day. Almost immediately, Bálor, Priest and Ripley suddenly turned on their leader, attacking Edge with his own signature con-chair-to move and kicking him out of the group.

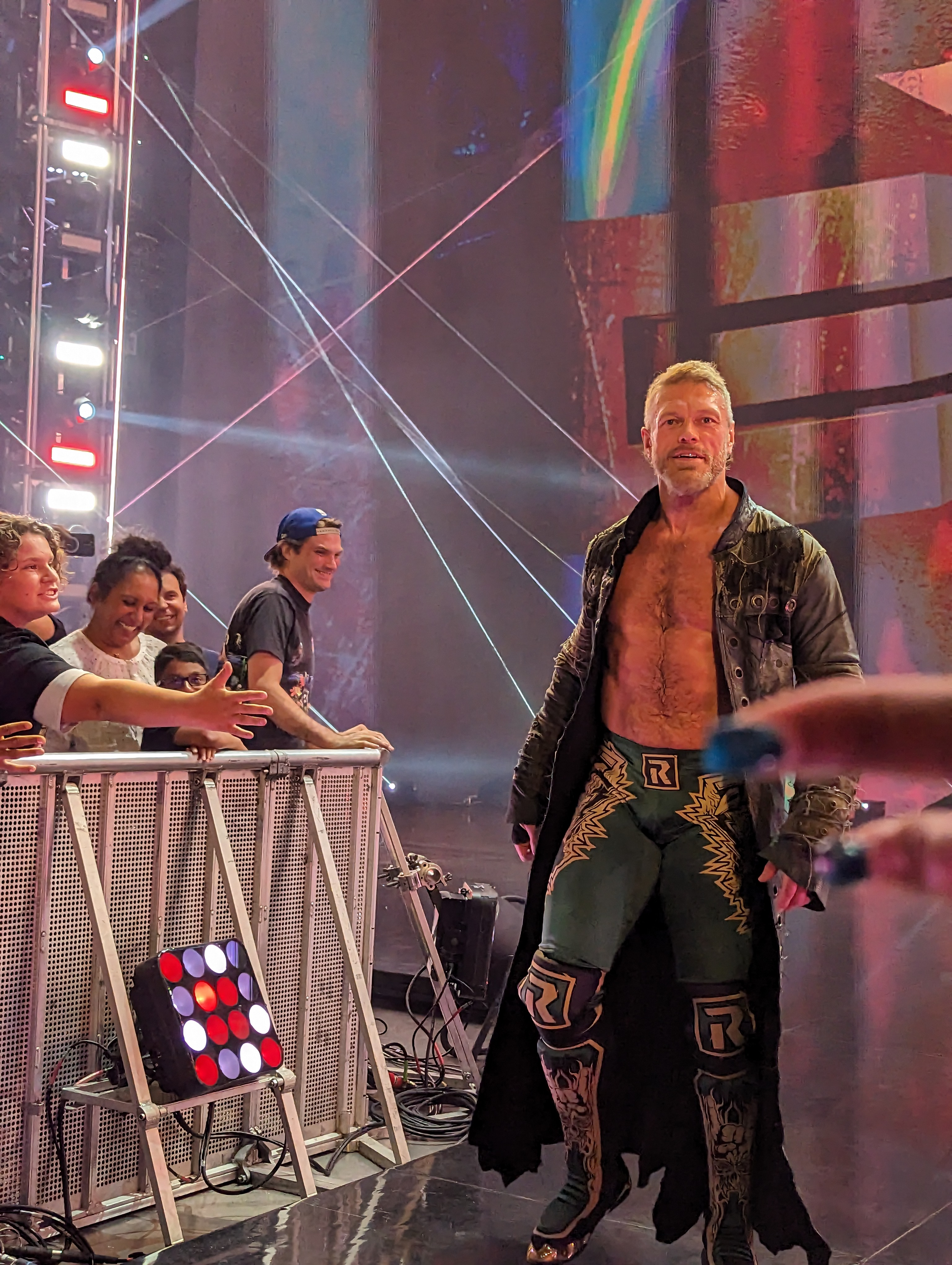
Edge making his entrance in July 2023

At SummerSlam on July 30, Edge returned as a face to help The Mysterios (composed of Rey and Dominik Mysterio) win their No Disqualification match vs. The Judgment Day. He also returned with his previous theme song Metalingus by Alter Bridge on the next show of Raw. At Clash at the Castle on September 3, Edge teamed up with Rey Mysterio to defeat The Judgment Day. After the match however, Dominik attacked Edge with a low blow and clotheslined his father Rey. At Extreme Rules on October 8, Edge was defeated by Bálor in an "I Quit" match after interference from Dominik, Priest and Ripley. After he said "I Quit", Ripley attacked his wife, Beth Phoenix (who also interfered during the match on his behalf), with a violent con-chair-to, causing her an injury (kayfabe). After a 3-month hiatus, Edge returned at the Royal Rumble on January 28, 2023, at #24 eliminating Bálor and Priest before being eliminated by them after interference from Dominik. At Elimination Chamber on February 18, Edge and Phoenix defeated Bálor and Ripley in a mixed tag team match despite interference from Dominik. In a press conference after the event, Edge answered Austin Theory's open challenge for the United States Championship. On the next Raw show, Edge failed to win the title after an interference from Finn Bálor. On Night 2 of WrestleMania 39, Edge defeated Bálor in a Hell in a Cell match, ending his rivalry with The Judgment Day.

In the 2023 WWE Draft, Edge was drafted to the SmackDown brand. Following being drafted to SmackDown, Edge would enter the tournament to crown the inaugural World Heavyweight Champion. On the May 12 episode of SmackDown, Edge faced AJ Styles and Rey Mysterio in the first round of the tournament, but lost after being pinned by Styles. On the July 7 episode of SmackDown, Edge was interviewed by Grayson Waller on The Grayson Waller Effect, where Edge shot down rumors of his retirement. Later that night, Edge defeated Waller and praised him, following the match. On the August 18 episode of SmackDown, which celebrated his 25 years with WWE, Edge defeated Sheamus in his hometown of Toronto in what would be his last appearance and match for WWE. Edge's contract with WWE expired on September 30.

=== All Elite Wrestling (2023–present) ===
==== TNT Champion (2023–2024) ====
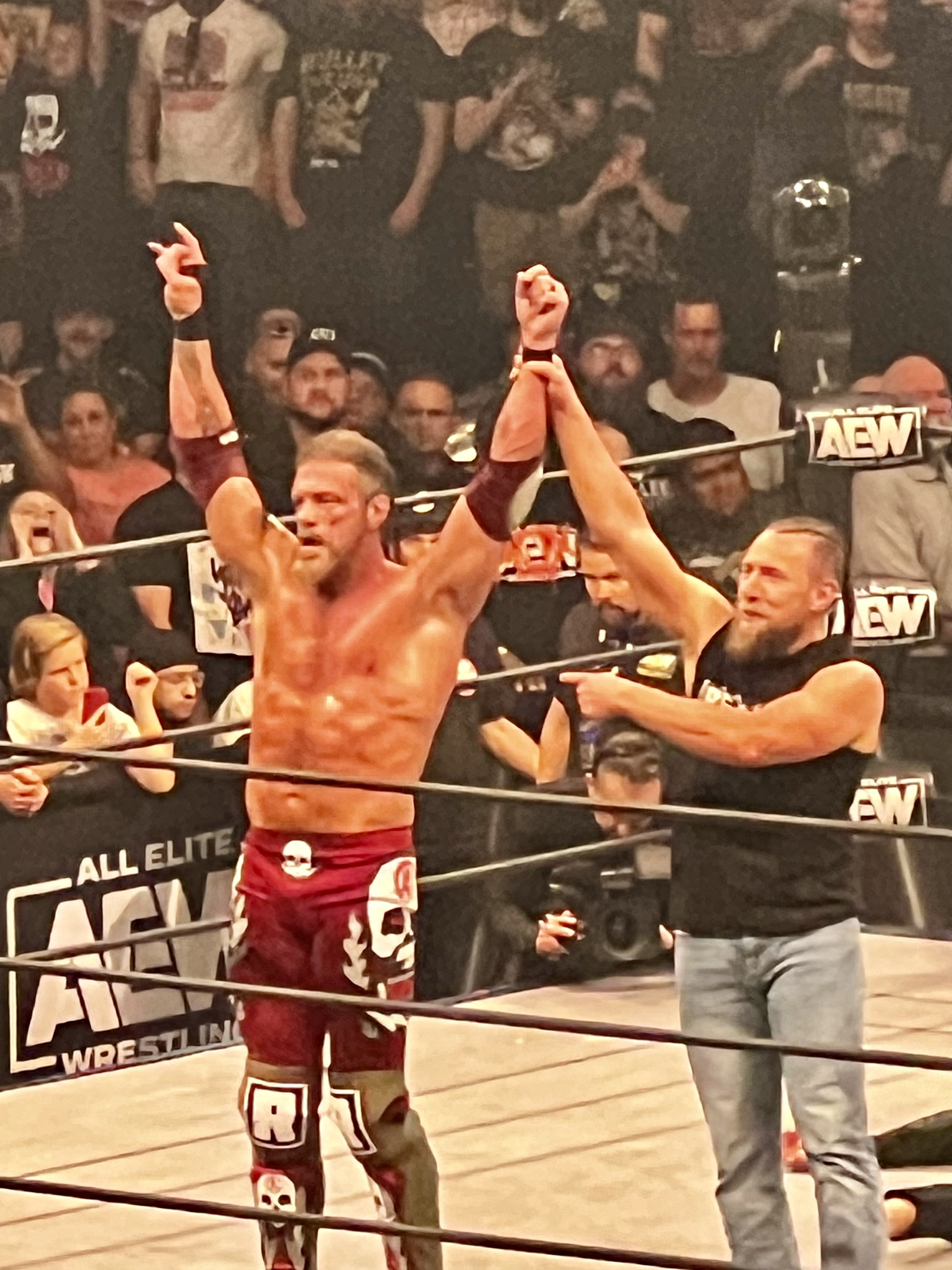
Copeland and Bryan Danielson in October 2023

On October 1, 2023, Copeland debuted in All Elite Wrestling (AEW) at the end of AEW's WrestleDream PPV event under his real name and the "Rated R Superstar" monicker, saving Sting and Darby Allin from an attack by Christian Cage, Luchasaurus, and Nick Wayne. During the post-event media scrum, it was revealed that Copeland signed a full-time multi-year contract with AEW. Copeland made his AEW in-ring debut on the October 10 episode of Dynamite, defeating Luchasaurus. Copeland began a feud with Cage, facing him and his stable, The Patriarchy, teaming with Allin & Sting to defeat them in a six-man tag team match at Full Gear on November 18. Copeland went on to defeat Cage for the TNT Championship at Worlds End on December 30, but lost it back to Cage when Cage invoked the title shot earned by his Patriarchy member Killswitch (formerly Luchasaurus) earlier that night to get an immediate rematch, ending Copeland's reign in approximately three minutes. Copeland regained the title in an "I quit" match on March 20, 2024, which started as the main event of Dynamite and concluded on a special live Rampage airing immediately after, ending their six-month feud.

Copeland defended the TNT Championship on Dynamite and Collision in a series of open challenges, he dubbed "The Cope Open", successfully defending the title against the likes of Matt Cardona, Penta El Zero Miedo, Buddy Matthews, Brody King and Kyle O'Reilly. In March, Copeland began a feud with the House of Black (Malakai Black, Brody King and Buddy Matthews). At the Dynasty event on April 21, Copeland teamed with Mark Briscoe and Eddie Kingston to face the House of Black in a six-man tag team match, but lost. On May 26 at Double or Nothing, Copeland successfully defended the TNT Championship vs. Malakai Black in a barbed wire steel cage match. However, during the match, Copeland suffered a legitimate fractured tibia after leaping from the top of the cage, and was stripped of the title in kayfabe by AEW executive vice presidents The Young Bucks (Matthew Jackson and Nicholas Jackson) on the May 29 episode of Dynamite, ending his second reign at 70 days.

==== Rated FTR (2024–2025) ====
At Worlds End on December 28, Copeland returned from injury and aligned himself with FTR (Cash Wheeler and Dax Harwood) against the Death Riders (Jon Moxley, Claudio Castagnoli, Pac, and Wheeler Yuta). The trio of Copeland and FTR would go by the name "Rated FTR". In January 2025, Copeland adopted the shortened ring name Cope, a real-life nickname. He then feuded with the AEW World Champion Jon Moxley and challenged him for the title twice, but was unsuccessful both times: first at Revolution on March 9 (which became a three-way match after Christian Cage invoked a title shot contract during the match), and then on the March 19 episode of Dynamite in a street fight. On April 6 at Dynasty, Rated FTR unsuccessfully challenged the Death Riders (Claudio Castagnoli, Pac, and Wheeler Yuta) for the AEW World Trios Championship. After the match, Cope was attacked by FTR, ending their alliance.

==== Cage & Cope (2025–2026) ====
On July 12 at All In, Cope returned after a three-month absence, saving Christian Cage from an attack by FTR and The Patriarchy. After returning, Copeland quietly reverted to performing under his real name. On the August 13 episode of Dynamite, Cage came to the aid of Copeland from an attack by FTR, Nick Wayne, and Kip Sabian. Copeland then embraced Cage and a tag match was announced between the duo and Wayne (later replaced by Killswitch) and Sabian on August 24 at Forbidden Door, where Copeland and Cage were victorious. At All Out on September 20, the team defeated FTR. After the match, FTR attacked Copeland, Cage, and then Copeland's wife Beth Copeland, while he was handcuffed. On the following episode of Dynamite, Copeland explained to Cage that he would be leaving for a while to take care of his family and was unsure if he would return; this was done to allow Copeland to go on hiatus to film the third season of Percy Jackson and the Olympians.

After a six-month absence, both Copeland and Cage returned at Revolution on March 15, 2026, where they attacked FTR (who had just retained their AEW World Tag Team Championship) and stared down The Young Bucks (Matt Jackson and Nick Jackson). After returning, the duo of Cage and Copeland began to be referred to as "Cage & Cope". On April 12 at Dynasty, Cage and Cope unsuccessfully challenged FTR for the tag titles, but defeated them at Double or Nothing on May 24 in an "I Quit" match to win the tag titles, thus ending their feud. The duo would go on to successfully defend their titles at Forbidden Door on June 28 against The Dogs (David Finlay and Clark Connors), at Redemption on July 26 against the Death Riders (Claudio Castagnoli and Pac), and at All In on August 30 against The Young Bucks only to lose them to the Young Bucks in a three-way ladder match also involving FTR at All Out ending their reign at 125 days.

==== Retirement tour (2026–present) ====
After All Out, it was revealed that Cage had suffered three broken ribs and a collapsed lung in the ladder match, leaving Copeland as a singles wrestler. On the October 14 episode of Dynamite, Copeland defeated Josh Alexander to qualify for the Clockwork Carnage match for the AEW World Championship at WrestleDream. Following the match, Copeland announced that he would be retiring from in-ring action in 2027. At WrestleDream on October 17, Copeland failed to win the title. On November 4, Copeland competed in a six-on-six Blood and Guts match at the namesake event, where his team was defeated after Copeland surrendered to save Will Ospreay. At Full Gear on November 14, Copeland unsuccessfully challenged Kazuchika Okada for the AEW International Championship.

=== Maple Leaf Pro Wrestling (2026) ===
Copeland made his Maple Leaf Pro Wrestling (MLP) debut at Northern Rising on October 3, 2026, in the Maple Leaf Gardens, where he defeated Steve Maclin in a Street Fight.

== Professional wrestling style and persona ==
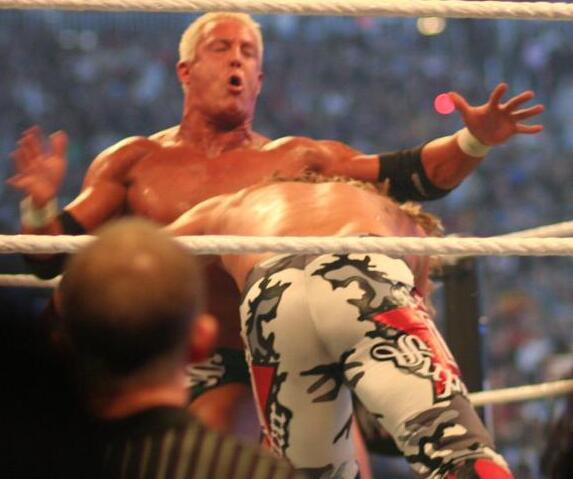
Edge hitting his finishing move, the spear, on Mr. Kennedy at WrestleMania 23

Edge utilizes the spear as his finisher; Michael Cole praised the psychology Edge included in the move, since "he knew that the longer he made the audience wait, the better it was going to be". He has also performed other finishers including a lifting DDT called the Edgecution in WWE or the Impaler in AEW, and an inverted sharpshooter submission hold called the Edgecator.

=== 1998–2002 ===
Weeks before his WWE debut in 1998, vignettes aired portraying Edge as a loner and, as Jim Ross described on his debut, "some sort of a tortured soul", mysteriously roaming across various locations in a city while displaying uncontrolled rage and assaulting innocent pedestrians. (Note: Edge's vignettes were filmed at multiple locations throughout New York City, including inside subway trains and stations such as Spring Street.) The vignettes also featured a female voice describing Edge's persona and characteristics—the same voice later used to deliver the line "You think you know me?" at the beginning of his entrance themes throughout his WWE career. Upon debuting, Edge entered the arena through the crowd for his matches, then slid into the ring while performing a humping motion on the mat, a practice that lasted until he became part of a tag team with Christian. In a 2019 interview, Copeland described how "as much as it [the gimmick] didn't make sense, I still knew that they [WWE] were trying to set me up as much as they could."

Later that year, upon teaming with Christian and Gangrel, the trio adopted a vampire clan gimmick, though commentators often characterized them as living a "gothic lifestyle". The group made dramatic entrances by emerging through a ring of fire onto the elevated stage, with Gangrel carrying a chalice of "blood", from which he would drink, sometimes sharing it with Edge or Christian, before spitting it towards the crowd. One of the group's signature tactics was delivering a "blood bath" to their opponents either before or after matches, in which the arena lights would go out, followed by Gangrel's red flashing entrance lights, before the lights returned to reveal the victim covered in "blood". All three members had long blond hair; Gangrel and Christian dressed in white shirts and dark pants, while Edge retained the long leather coat from his earlier persona prior to joining The Brood. Copeland later stated that he felt insecure about his previous character and welcomed the opportunity to join The Brood, believing it gave him the confidence he needed at the time. The Hardy Boyz also applied this gimmick during their feud with Edge and Christian in 1999.

Following their victory at WrestleMania 2000, Edge and Christian reinvented themselves as a villainous duo characterized by comedic arrogance and surfer-styled teen idol personas. They abandoned their crowd entrances in favor of in-ring antics, frequently mocking their opponents and the host city. The pair popularized catchphrases such as "reek of awesomeness" and deliberately wore outrageous costumes. One of their signature routines was the "five-second pose", in which they struck exaggerated poses in the ring for fans to photograph, often using the moment to ridicule their opponents or local icons to provoke the audience. Notable examples included mocking Elvis Presley in Memphis, Tennessee, a Kentucky "Jug Band", and imitating Bill Buckner's 1986 World Series error at the 2000 King of the Ring event in Boston, Massachusetts.

=== 2002–2011 ===
Upon being drafted to SmackDown! in 2002, Edge evolved as a determined singles competitor, in which he would have seen significant popularity and stronger rivalries. Once Edge returned and turned heel in 2004, he adopted a cocky and brash persona, becoming more ruthless and aggressive than ever in his pursuit of the World Heavyweight Championship.

After his affair with Lita was brought to television as an on-screen relationship in 2005, Edge began to adopt the persona of a villain who reveled in controversy, nicknamed "The Rated-R Superstar". This moniker was solidified when Edge and Lita performed a "live sex celebration" segment after he won his first WWE Championship in 2006. He has also been nicknamed "The Master Manipulator" and "The Ultimate Opportunist" due to how he used the Money in the Bank briefcase, along with other underhanded opportunities, to win numerous world championships. When asked about the persona, Copeland described Edge's "Rated-R Superstar" character as akin to a sleazy rockstar, comparing it to an "'Appetite for Destruction'-era Guns N' Roses, or 'Too Fast for Love'-era Mötley Crüe; like this sleazy, slimy, pretty horrible person that you could picture crawling under the gutter to try and steal your girlfriend. He was that guy, and that, I always said, when I walked through the curtain, that's when I became 'Edge'. And as soon as I walked back through that curtain, I'm going to grab a coffee and I'm right back to being Adam." In 2012, WWE voted him as both the third-best World Heavyweight Champion and 20th-best wrestling villain in WWE history.

=== 2020–present ===
Since 2020, Edge's wrestling persona has been defined by his return from retirement and his portrayal as a determined veteran, which WWE and AEW incorporated into his storylines. During his heel persona with The Judgment Day in 2022, Edge drew on dark themes of judgment, retribution, and moral superiority, portraying as someone who believed he was enacting justice against WWE's "weakness" or "frauds".

=== Entrance themes ===
From his debut in 1998 until 2001, Edge used "You Think You Know Me", composed by long-time WWE composer Jim Johnston, as his entrance theme. When he transitioned to singles competition, he adopted Rob Zombie's "Never Gonna Stop (The Red Red Kroovy)" as his entrance music, which he used until his 2004 return, when he reverted to his original theme for a short period of time as the copyright ran out on "Never Gonna Stop". In a 2021 interview with Revolver, after receiving an advanced copy of The Sinister Urge, he was given the choice between four tracks. He gravitated toward "Never Gonna Stop", embracing the song's message as a personal mindset centered on perseverance.

Following his heel turn later that year, Edge began using "Metalingus" by Alter Bridge from their album One Day Remains. In a 2013 interview, Copeland explained how the song became his entrance music: "When I was out with my neck injury, I met Mark Tremonti. I met him at a Metallica show, actually. And I went back to his place after and he played me what would end up being the first Alter Bridge album. I heard Metalingus and I was like, 'Dude, can I use that when I come back?' And he said, 'Yeah! Of course!' So that ended up being the genesis of it and when I heard it, it was actually Mark singing. It hadn’t been Myles yet. So it was in its infancy, but I had heard that song. I was like, 'Okay, that’s gonna be what I come to the ring to.' And that’s how that all started." A remix of "Metalingus" and "Burn in My Light" by Mercy Drive was also briefly used as his entrance music alongside Randy Orton during their time as part of Rated-RKO. In 2022, ahead of his buildup match with AJ Styles at WrestleMania 38 and reflecting his heel persona with The Judgment Day, Edge adopted "The Other Side", also by Alter Bridge from their album The Last Hero, as his entrance theme. "Metalingus" has been consistently ranked as one of the greatest entrance themes in WWE history.

== Acting career ==
In 2000, Copeland had a cameo appearance as a road bandit in the fantasy movie Highlander: Endgame. In March 2002, he appeared with other wrestlers on the quiz show Weakest Link. He was voted out in the first round, and the eventual winner was Kane. On the August 6, 2006, episode of Mind of Mencia, he appeared as Edge as a commentator for "The Royal Religious Rumble". He punched out an actor playing L. Ron Hubbard to stop Scientology from ruling the world and then speared another actor playing Tom Cruise. In March 2007, Copeland appeared alongside Randy Orton, John Cena, and Bobby Lashley on Deal or No Deal. Weeks later, he appeared on the sketch comedy show MADtv. He appeared in a Slim Jim commercial, in which his "spicy side" caused chaos in a DMV, a restaurant, and a hotel. Edge: a Decade of Decadence, a DVD documentary of Copeland's life, was released in December 2008. The DVD illustrates his wrestling career dating from when he entered the WWF to 2008.

In June 2011, Copeland appeared as Thelo, an Abnormal, in the Sanctuary episode "Into the Black". In September 2011, he held an "Edgucational" Essay Scholarship Contest, as an echo back to how he himself got a start in the wrestling business. The scholarship went to one of the students at Squared Circle Wrestling in Toronto, Alysha Verhoven, who has since gone on to work as Leah von Dutch. Copeland appeared regularly in the Syfy series Haven, which started in July 2011, as Dwight Hendrickson, a troubled man whose affliction is revealed to be attracting bullets and who works as a cleaner, cleaning up after the troubles. He is later appointed the chief of police. He was part of the cast until the show's series finale in December 2015. WWE Studios released Bending the Rules, in which Copeland starred, in 2012. WWE released the official trailer of the film on the February 28, 2012, episode of Raw. The 2012 documentary, You Think You Know Me – The Story of Edge, includes a look at Copeland's life and career in pro wrestling.

On September 4, 2013, Copeland hosted a special episode of the Syfy series Ghost Mine. In December 2014, Copeland made a cameo appearance in the music video for the In-Flight Safety song "Destroy" as his Dwight Hendrickson character. In July 2015, Copeland was nominated for a Golden Maple Award for Best Actor in a TV series which was broadcast in the United States for his role in Haven as Dwight Hendrickson. On July 16, 2015, it was announced that Copeland would portray Atom-Smasher in the second season of The Flash. On February 21, 2016, Copeland and Christian began starring on The Edge and Christian Show That Totally Reeks of Awesomeness, a series on the WWE Network. On July 14, 2016, Copeland starred in the Canadian television series Private Eyes where he played Ben Fisk. On July 26, 2016, it was announced that Copeland would play Kjetill Flatnose on Season 5 and 6 of the Vikings in a recurring role. The series ended December 30, 2020.

On October 13, 2022, it was announced that Copeland would play Ares in the Percy Jackson and the Olympians television series adaptation of the original book series, streaming on Disney+.

== Other media ==
His autobiography, Adam Copeland on Edge, was released on November 2, 2004. Unlike most wrestlers who used ghostwriters to write their biographies, Copeland wrote the entire book himself, in longhand. Mick Foley, who also wrote his wrestling autobiography himself in longhand, wrote the foreword to his book.

In March 2016, Copeland appeared on CBC's Canada Reads competition where he championed the book Minister Without Portfolio by the English-born Canadian writer and author Michael Winter.

From March 2017 to September 2019, Copeland co-hosted the E&C's Pod of Awesomeness podcast with Christian. He has since left the podcast.

On August 21, 2022, Edge was the subject of an episode of the documentary series Biography: WWE Legends.

== Video games ==
Year	Title	Notes
1999	WWF Attitude	Video game debut
1999	WWF WrestleMania 2000	
2000	WWF SmackDown!	
2000	WWF Royal Rumble	
2000	WWF No Mercy	Cover athlete
2000	WWF SmackDown! 2: Know Your Role	
2001	WWF With Authority!	
2001	WWF Road to WrestleMania	
2001	WWF SmackDown! Just Bring It	
2002	WWF Raw	
2002	WWE WrestleMania X8	
2002	WWE Road to WrestleMania X8	
2002	WWE SmackDown! Shut Your Mouth	
2003	WWE Crush Hour	
2003	WWE WrestleMania XIX	
2003	WWE Raw 2	
2003	WWE SmackDown! Here Comes the Pain	
2004	WWE Day of Reckoning	
2004	WWE Survivor Series	
2004	WWE SmackDown! vs. Raw	
2005	WWE WrestleMania 21	
2005	WWE Aftershock	Cover athlete
2005	WWE Day of Reckoning 2	
2005	WWE SmackDown! vs. Raw 2006	
2006	WWE SmackDown vs. Raw 2007	
2007	WWE SmackDown vs. Raw 2008	
2008	WWE SmackDown vs. Raw 2009	
2009	WWE Legends of WrestleMania	It requires WWE SmackDown vs. Raw 2009 for exporting its roster on this game.
2009	WWE SmackDown vs. Raw 2010	Cover athlete
2010	WWE SmackDown vs. Raw 2011	
2011	WWE All Stars	
2011	WWE '12	
2012	WWE WrestleFest	
2012	WWE '13	
2013	WWE 2K14	
2014	WWE SuperCard	
2014	WWE 2K15	Downloadable content (not available for Old Gen consoles)
2015	WWE 2K16	
2016	WWE 2K17	
2017	WWE Champions	
2017	WWE 2K18	
2018	WWE 2K19	
2019	WWE 2K20	
2020	WWE 2K Battlegrounds	Downloadable content
2022	WWE 2K22	
2023	WWE 2K23	
2023	AEW Fight Forever	Downloadable content

== Personal life ==
Copeland lives in Asheville, North Carolina. He began a relationship with Alannah Morley, the sister of wrestler Val Venis, in 1998; they married on November 8, 2001, and divorced on March 10, 2004. He married Lisa Ortiz on October 21, 2004. Soon after marrying her, he began an affair with wrestler Amy Dumas, otherwise known as Lita, who was dating his friend Matt Hardy. The affair became public knowledge in February 2005, resulting in Copeland and Ortiz divorcing on November 17, 2005; Copeland and Dumas would break up in late 2006. Copeland and Elizabeth Kociański, who wrestles as Beth Phoenix in WWE, began a relationship together in 2011. They have two daughters, born in 2013 and 2016. They were married on October 30, 2016 (his 43rd birthday).

Copeland is a lifelong close friend of wrestler Christian Cage. He is a fan of the Toronto Maple Leafs and New Jersey Devils ice hockey teams, and used to play ice hockey with retired NHL player Aaron Downey. He has said that he smoked one cigarette when he was 16, hated it, and has not smoked since. He has several tattoos including a red and black sun on his left upper biceps which covers a former tattoo of a muscular shark, a star on his right upper biceps with several smaller stars and two skulls wearing bandanas adorned with flowers and hearts, a cross on his left forearm, and a scroll adorned with the words "Rise Above". All of his tattoos represent a stage in his career.

In March 2007, Sports Illustrated investigated a steroid and human growth hormone (hGH) ring used by a number of professional athletes in several sports. An article mentioned several current and former WWE wrestlers, including Copeland, who was alleged to have obtained hGH. Copeland previously admitted to using steroids in April 2004 as an experiment after neck surgery, but said he felt like they slowed him down so he quickly stopped using them. According to Copeland, he took hGH after returning from a spinal fusion neck surgery because doctors told him that it would help the bones grow back around the screws and plate that were inserted into his neck. A Sports Illustrated article in August 2007 named Copeland as one of 10 wrestlers who were found to have purchased steroids and other drugs from an online pharmacy in violation of WWE's Talent Wellness program. He was said to have received the growth hormones somatropin and genotropin, as well as the steroid stanozolol, between September 2004 and February 2007.

== Filmography ==
=== Film ===
Key
†	Denotes films that have not yet been released

Year	Title	Role	Notes
1999	Beyond the Mat	Himself	Uncredited
2000	Highlander: Endgame	Lachlan	
2012	Bending the Rules	Nick Blades	
2015	Dumb Luck	Cameron	Short film
2016	Interrogation	Lucas Nolan	
2020	Money Plane	Jack Reese	
2027	The Beekeeper 2 †	TBA	Post-production

=== Television ===
Year	Title	Role	Notes
2002	Weakest Link	Edge	1 episode
2004	Ministry of Mayhem	Edge	1 episode
2006	Mind of Mencia	Edge	Season 2, episode 13: "Royal Religious Rumble"
2007	Deal or No Deal	Edge	1 episode
2007	MADtv	Cornell Overstreet / Edge	1 episode
2011	Sanctuary	Thelo	2 episodes
2011–2015	Haven	Dwight Hendrickson	Recurring role, 42 episodes
2013	Ghost Mine	Himself	Host - 1 episode
2015	The Flash	Al Rothstein / Atom Smasher	Season 2, episode 1: "The Man Who Saved Central City"
2016	Canada Reads	Himself	4 episodes
2016	Private Eyes	Ben Fisk	Season 1, episode 8: "I Do, I Do"
2016	Bookaboo	Himself	2 episodes
2017–2020	Vikings	Kjetill Flatnose	Recurring role, 25 episodes
2020	Trailer Park Boys: The Animated Series	Sledge (voice)	Season 2, episode 5: "Clint Eatswood"
2024–present	Percy Jackson and the Olympians	Ares	4 episodes

=== Music video ===
Year	Title	Role	Notes
2014	"Destroy"	In-Flight Safety	Dwight Hendrickson

== Awards and nominations ==
Year	Award	Category	Work	Result
2015	Golden Maple Awards	Best Actor in a TV series broadcast in the U.S	Haven	Nominated
2024	Children's and Family Emmy Awards	Outstanding Supporting Performer	Percy Jackson and the Olympians	Nominated

== Championships and accomplishments ==
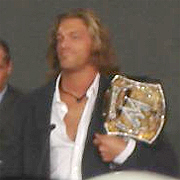
Edge is a four-time WWE Champion...

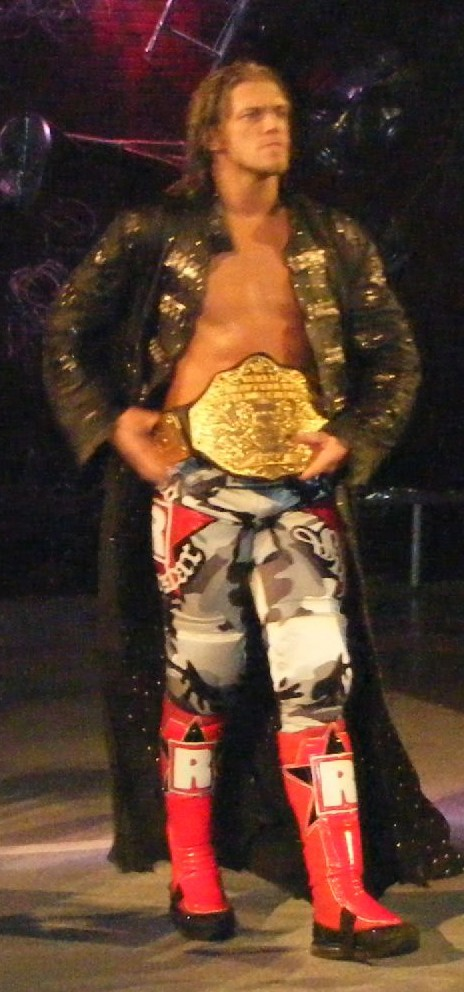
a record seven-time World Heavyweight Champion...

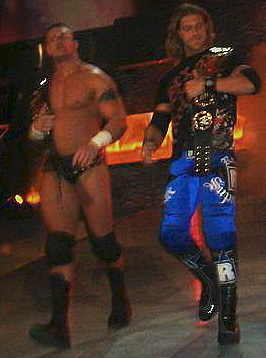
a 12-time WWF/World Tag Team Champion...

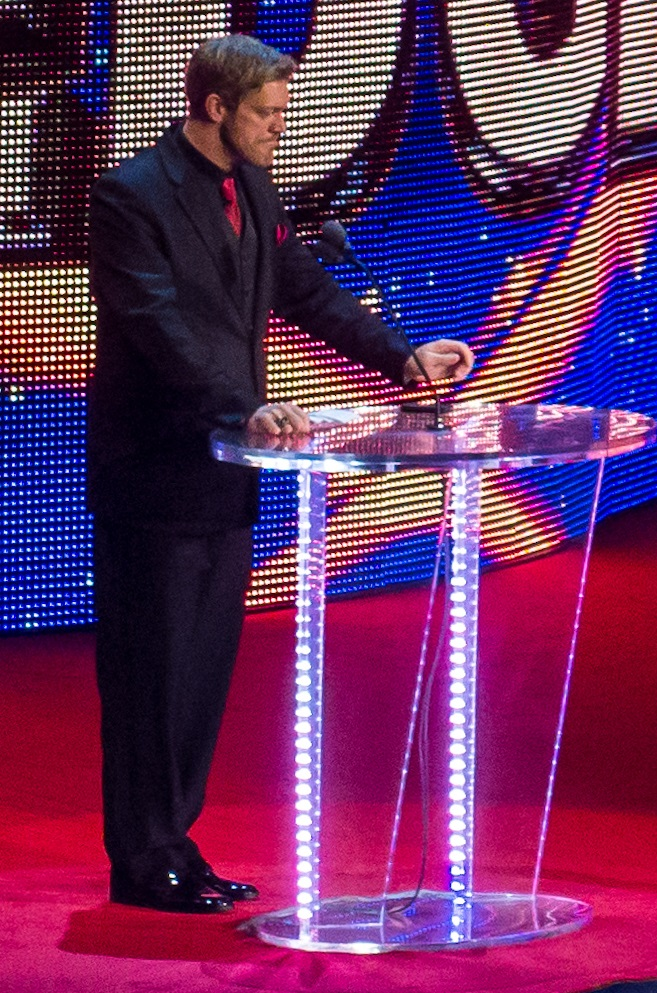
and was inducted into the WWE Hall of Fame in 2012.

- All Elite Wrestling
  - AEW TNT Championship (2 times)
  - AEW World Tag Team Championship (1 time) – with Christian Cage
- The Baltimore Sun
  - Best Feud of the Decade (2000s) vs. John Cena
- Canadian Pro-Wrestling Hall of Fame
  - Class of 2021 – with Christian
  - Class of 2024 – individually
- Canadian Wrestling Association
  - CWA North American Championship (1 time)
- Cauliflower Alley Club
  - Men's Wrestling Award (2013)
- CBS Sports
  - Best Moment of the Year (2020) returning to WWE at the Royal Rumble
  - Promo of the Year (2020) putting Randy Orton on notice on WWE Raw
- Insane Championship Wrestling
  - ICW Street Fight Tag Team Championship (2 times) – with Christian Cage (1) and Joe E. Legend (1)
  - MWCW Tag Team Championship (1 time) – with Joe E. Legend
- Outlaw Championship Wrestling
  - OCW Tag Team Championship (1 time) – with Joe E. Legend
- George Tragos/Lou Thesz Professional Wrestling Hall of Fame
  - Lou Thesz Award (2013)
- Pro Wrestling Illustrated
  - Comeback of the Year (2004)
  - Feud of the Year (2005) with Lita vs. Matt Hardy
  - Feud of the Year (2006) vs. John Cena
  - Match of the Year (2000) with Christian vs. The Dudley Boyz vs. The Hardy Boyz in a Triangle Ladder match at WrestleMania 2000
  - Match of the Year (2001) with Christian vs. The Dudley Boyz vs. The Hardy Boyz in a Tables, Ladders, and Chairs match at WrestleMania X-Seven
  - Most Hated Wrestler of the Year (2006)
  - Most Improved Wrestler of the Year (2001)
  - Inspirational Wrestler of the Year (2021)
  - Ranked No. 2 of the top 500 singles wrestlers in the PWI 500 in 2007
- Sports Illustrated
  - Ranked No. 14 of the 20 Greatest WWE Wrestlers Of All Time
- Tokyo Pro Wrestling
  - CCW Tag Team Championship (1 time) – with Ken Johnson
  - CCW Tag Team Championship Tournament (1998) – with Ken Johnson
- Wrestling Observer Newsletter
  - Match of the Year (2002) with Rey Mysterio vs. Kurt Angle and Chris Benoit at No Mercy
  - Tag Team of the Year (2000) with Christian
  - Worst Feud of the Year (2010) vs. Kane
  - Worst Worked Match of the Year (2008) vs. Vladimir Kozlov and Triple H at Survivor Series
- World Wrestling Federation / Entertainment / WWE
  - WWE Championship (4 times)
  - World Heavyweight Championship (7 times)
  - WWE Intercontinental Championship (5 times)
  - WCW United States Championship (1 time)
  - World Tag Team Championship (12 times) – with Christian (7), Hollywood Hulk Hogan (1), Chris Benoit (2), Randy Orton (1) and Chris Jericho (1)
  - WWE Tag Team Championship (2 times) – with Rey Mysterio (1) and Chris Jericho (1)
  - King of the Ring (2001)
  - Money in the Bank (2005, inaugural)
  - Royal Rumble (2010, 2021)
  - 14th Triple Crown Champion
  - Third Grand Slam Champion (under the current format, 13th overall)
  - Bragging Rights Trophy (2010) – with Team SmackDown (Big Show, Rey Mysterio, Jack Swagger, Alberto Del Rio, Kofi Kingston and Tyler Reks)
  - Championship Chase Tournament (2008)
  - Gold Rush Tournament (2005)
  - Slammy Award (4 times)
    - Couple of the Year (2008) – with Vickie Guerrero
    - "Oh Snap" Meltdown of the Year (2010) – Destroying the Anonymous Raw General Manager's computer
    - Return of the Year (2020)
    - Rivalry of the Year (2020) – with Randy Orton
  - WWE Hall of Fame (Class of 2012)

=== Luchas de Apuestas record ===
Winner (wager)	Loser (wager)	Location	Event	Date	Notes
Edge (hair)	Kurt Angle (hair)	Nashville, Tennessee	Judgment Day	May 19, 2002	
