= Watch Over You =

- Cover of single featuring Cristina Scabbia

Single by Alter Bridge

from the album Blackbird
- Released: January 14, 2008
- Genre: Post-grunge; hard rock
- Length: 4:19 (album version); 4:22 (duet version)
- Label: Universal Republic
- Songwriters: Mark Tremonti; Myles Kennedy; Brian Marshall; Scott Phillips
- Producer: Michael "Elvis" Baskette

Alter Bridge singles chronology
"Rise Today" (2007)	"Watch Over You" (2008)	"Ties That Bind" (2008)

Music video
- "Watch Over You" on Vimeo

"Watch Over You" is a song by American rock band Alter Bridge. Written by lead guitarist Mark Tremonti and lead vocalist Myles Kennedy, it was produced by Michael "Elvis" Baskette and featured on the band's 2007 second studio album Blackbird. The track was released as the second single from the album on January 14, 2008, peaking at number 19 on the US Billboard Mainstream Rock Songs chart. An alternate version of the track featuring additional vocals by Lacuna Coil singer Cristina Scabbia was also later made available as a digital download.

== Promotion and release ==
"Watch Over You" was released as the second single from Blackbird on January 14, 2008. The song was also featured in a number of episodes of Celebrity Rehab with Dr. Drew, which led to it becoming known as an "unofficial anthem" for the show. It is usually played in a "stripped down" acoustic format, often by lead vocalist and rhythm guitarist Myles Kennedy alone.

In April 2008, an alternate version of "Watch Over You" featuring additional vocals by Lacuna Coil singer Cristina Scabbia was released as a single. Speaking about the collaboration, Scabbia claimed that she was "honoured and grateful for the awesome experience".

== Music video ==
The music video for "Watch Over You" was directed by John Cummings. The video contains footage from the second season of Celebrity Rehab with Dr. Drew, including scenes in which former Guns N' Roses drummer Steven Adler is featured. It shows Myles singing inside the warehouse. At the end of the video, he is seen outside of the warehouse.

== Reception ==
=== Commercial ===
"Watch Over You" entered the US Billboard Mainstream Rock Songs chart at number 30 for the week of February 2, 2008. It peaked at number 19 four weeks later, spending a total of 13 weeks on the chart. It was also the first single by the band to register on the Adult Pop Songs chart, on which it spent three weeks at number 40 in early 2009.

=== Critical ===
Tom Shackleford of AXS named "Watch Over You" as one of Kennedy's six best vocal performances, claiming that "The song's cooler, autumn-like feel really showcases Kennedy's singing with a beautiful, held-out chorus line before picking up and turning things up a notch as the song reaches its climax".

== Track listings ==
All tracks are written by Mark Tremonti and Myles Kennedy.

One-track digital download
No.	Title	Length
1.	"Watch Over You" (featuring Cristina Scabbia)	4:22
Total length:		4:22

Two-track digital download
No.	Title	Length
1.	"Watch Over You" (featuring Cristina Scabbia)	4:22
2.	"Watch Over You"	4:19
Total length:		8:41

== Chart positions ==
Chart (2008–2009)	Peak position
US Adult Top 40 (Billboard)	40
US Mainstream Rock (Billboard)	19
