= Matchless Amplifiers =

American guitar amplifier company

- Type: Private
- Industry: Amplification
- Founded: 1989; 37 years ago
- Founders: Mark Sampson, Rick Perrotta
- Headquarters: Los Angeles, California, United States
- Key people: Steve Goodale, Phil Jamison
- Products: Amplifiers
- Website: matchlessamplifiers.com

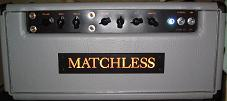
Matchless HC-30 model with the trademark backlit nameplate featured on all Matchless amplifiers

Matchless Amplifiers is an American company that produces amplifiers for electric guitar. Founders Mark Sampson and Rick Perrotta launched Matchless in 1989 with the goal of producing amps that combined rugged, hand-wired construction with Vox AC30-style tones and modern features. The success of early models like the flagship DC-30, Chieftain, and Lightning positioned Matchless as one of the most prominent companies in the boutique amplifier boom of the late 1980s and 1990s. Matchless went bankrupt and subsequently closed in 1999, but returned under new ownership in 2000 and continues to produce hand-wired amplifiers in Los Angeles, California.

== History ==
=== Early years ===
Mark Sampson, who would go on to co-found Matchless, spent ten years on the professional drag racing circuit, building and racing custom cars while playing in rock bands at night. On tour, Sampson constantly dealt with faulty equipment and turned to repairing it himself using the electronics knowledge his TV repairman father had passed on to him. Sampson preferred Vox amplifiers but they were difficult to acquire in his native Iowa and even when he could source them, they were often in a state of disrepair since British-made amps typically had reliability issues compared to their American counterparts. For several years, Sampson maintained a business importing British amps and repairing them for sale. This lasted until the mid-1980s when the vintage instrument market became popular and drove up prices even for broken amps. Sampson began accepting jobs repairing old Vox amps for professional musicians and studios in Los Angeles, where he and his wife ultimately moved.

In 1989, Sampson was introduced to Rick Perrotta, who had sold his stake in a recording studio and was looking for a new business opportunity. The two decided to make an amp inspired by the Vox AC30 that would focus on improving reliability rather than on hot-rodding vintage circuits like other West Coast builders like Randall Smith of Mesa/Boogie were doing. Sampson and Perrotta would use the highest standards of construction and components for what would be expensive amps intended for professionals. They settled on the brand name "Matchless" to highlight the quality of their work.

=== First era ===
Early on, Matchless was a part-time hobby for the company's two founders, with each completing portions of an amp build at their respective houses and then getting together to finalize construction. These initial models consisted of the C-30 series, a range of 30-watt amplifiers that included what would become the brand's flagship, the 2x12 combo DC-30. What little profit the company made from their first sales was entirely devoted to purchasing more parts. In need of funds, Sampson and Perrotta allowed Steve Goodale to become a partner in exchange for a $20,000 investment. Goodale took over marketing, while Perrotta handled the business side and Sampson concentrated on design. An early an early marketing ploy they come up with was backlighting the Matchless logo on their amps, which would make them stand out on a dark stage. The company however continued "limping along" without a breakthrough.

In 1991, Matchless submitted a DC-30 for an amp "shoot-out" Guitar Player was conducting. Their amp was declared the winner with the article set to be published the following year. In the meantime, Sampson and Perrotta combined their money to show their amps at the 1992 NAMM Show but failed to make even a single sale. Matchless' fortunes turned for the better when Guitar Player's shoot-out results were published: within 90 days they had acquired 65 new dealers with 50% deposits on all orders. The DC-30 was subsequently adopted by a number of prominent guitarists like Bruce Springsteen, Brian May, Joe Perry, Billy Duffy, and Neil Young. Prior to 1992, Matchless was producing a single amp per week; by 1993, sales were increasing on a weekly basis and the brand responded by continually introducing new models, such as the Chieftain, Lightning, Clubman, Spitfire, Tornado, and Super Chief. Sampson later said, "Everything turned around fast. In fact it happened too fast."

With its newfound success, Matchless struggled to meet demand without an established business model and given the labor-intensive circuits: Matchless was making reliable amps by taking uncommon steps like insulating all capacitor leads and shock-mounting the tube sockets, which can be done when hand-wiring point-to-point but not when using the PCBs favored by larger manufacturers like Marshall to keep costs down. As a result, Matchless amps were the most expensive on the market not made by Dumble.

Matchless soon found itself struggling financially. The company had overexpanded and a confluence of factors like a recession in Japan hurt the business. Matchless began laying off employees in 1997 and filed for bankruptcy in 1998, the same year Sampson and Perrotta left to co-found the amplifier brand Bad Cat. Matchless closed in 1999, its collapse causing the brand's amps to drastically increase in value on the used market. These are often referred to as "Sampson era" amplifiers, as Sampson had been the company's chief designer.

=== New ownership ===
In August 2000, Matchless relaunched under new ownership, with Phil Jamison as chief operating officer. Jamison had previously worked for the company, building prototypes, training line workers, and performing quality control. Matchless continues to build models designed during the previous era using the same point-to-point construction, but has introduced new models as well, including the three-channel Independence, EL34-equipped Phoenix, Avalon, and Laurel Canyon. As of 2010, Matchless produced around 150 amps a year and maintained a profit margin of only one or two percent, despite a model like the DC-30 retailing for $3,999 at the time. As a result, the brand has never given away gear to professional players.

== Legacy ==
In the 1990s, the boutique amplifier scene experienced a "revival" following its initial wave of popularity behind one-man builders like Dumble. Many small amp makers launched successful brands during the 1980s and 1990s but it was Matchless that became the most prominent of them. Vintage Guitar described Matchless as the first "production boutique" company, as Matchless was the first to sell hand-wired amps in large numbers at a time when the wider industry had already shifted to using printed circuit boards. Guitar.com described the company as representing the "epitome" of amplifier construction quality and durability. Matchless amps are noted for their high retail prices and the high volumes players feel is needed for the amps to sound their best. COO Phil Jamison has in turn said the brand's amps are not meant for bedroom players and that part of the "magic" with Matchless amps is how they sound and respond when the volume is turned up.
