= Rivera Amplification =

American Guitar Amplifier Manufacturer

Rivera Amplifiers
- Type: Private
- Industry: Amplification
- Founded: Los Angeles, California, United States (1985; 41 years ago)
- Founder: Paul Rivera
- Headquarters: Los Angeles, California, United States
- Products: Amplifiers
- Website: www.rivera.com

Rivera Amplification is an American manufacturer of guitar amplifiers. Founded by Paul Rivera in 1985 in Southern California, Rivera helped popularize the boutique amplifier market, alongside fellow amp-modifiers turned builders Mike Soldano and Reinhold Bogner.

== History ==
Rivera first began modifying amplifiers in New York City in the late 1960s, having studied electronics in school and apprenticed at a recording studio. In 1975, Rivera relocated to North Hollywood, where his mods attracted session musicians in the L.A. music scene, and from there became popular among professional guitarists in New York City and Nashville, the latter in large part thanks to a mod Rivera did for Chet Atkins. Fender recruited Rivera in 1980, where he integrated many of his modifications into new amps for the brand, while learning much about marketing, manufacturing, and distribution. These amps, such as the Super Champ and Concert, combined Fender's classic clean tones with modern high gain and were the last to be made by Fender before its owners, CBS, sold the company to its then management. However, Rivera disliked working in a corporate environment and left to start his own company in 1985 and capture a piece of the market for hot-rodded multi-channel amplifiers dominated at the time by Mesa/Boogie.

In addition to work for individuals, Rivera also consulted with major manufacturers on groundbreaking amplifiers, such as the Yamaha G100-212 II, a solid-state, two-channel amp. Many players at the time called at a solid-state twin reverb. The parametric equalizer in the output stage was novel and drawn from Yamaha's research into home audio.

With his own shop, Rivera began performing modifications for many notable guitarists, such as on Marshall amps belonging to Eddie Van Halen, Eric Johnson, and Steve Lukather. Modifications he became known for included "fat" switches to extend lower frequencies and tailoring the EQ between gain stages to smooth out the top end and tighten the lows. Many of Rivera's original amplifier designs adhere to a dual-voice ethos, offering both American-voiced and British-voiced channels. Popular models include the R Series, the Fandango, and the Chubster, which all use EL34s, while the Quiana and Venus series use 6L6s. Other designs include the Sedona 55 for both electric and acoustic-electric guitar and the MIDI-controlled KR7 head made for Slipknot guitarist Mick Thomson.
