= Trainwreck Circuits =

American guitar amplifier company

- Type: Private
- Industry: Guitar amplification
- Founded: 1985; 41 years ago
- Founders: Ken Fischer
- Headquarters: Colonia, New Jersey, United States
- Products: Guitar amplifiers
- Website: www.trainwreck.com

Trainwreck Circuits is an American company that manufactures boutique guitar amplifiers. The company was founded by Ken Fischer (May 12, 1945 – December 23, 2006) in 1985. Trainwreck amplifiers are made in Colonia, New Jersey.

== History ==
Ken Fischer began working on electronics in the US Navy, and after he was no longer in military service, worked repairing televisions and radios,. He later was employed by Ampeg, where he built amplifiers, and eventually became senior engineer. Disillusioned, he left in 1967 when the company was being sold to Magnavox.

When Fischer set out on his own, he started building boutique amplifiers, and later, he added custom wood cabinets. He employed new old stock (NOS) components, and custom-built transformers in his designs. His early clients included Mark Knopfler and Eddie Van Halen. He made the first Trainwreck amp in his shop in New Jersey, in late 1982/early 1983. With inspiration from Atlantic Records Caspar McCloud the amp was named 'Ginger' after Caspar's wife. His first amps (later named "Liverpool 30") were based on the 4 × EL84 configuration of the Vox AC30. "In beautiful wood cabinetry that matched their legendary sound," They were made to order in limited numbers, and are "ultra-rare and highly collectible". Lacking serial numbers, they are individually designated with women's names; the one owned by guitarist and producer Matte Henderson is called "Nancy". The last one he built ("Kaylene"), while suffering from chronic fatigue immune dysfunction, was an Express made from an old leftover chassis. In 1998, with his health declining, Fischer partnered with Komet Amps in Louisiana to further develop his circuitry. This culminated in several acclaimed designs, including what would become Komet's flagship amplifier: the Komet 60.

In his final years, Ken Fischer collaborated with Dr. Z Amplification on the, "Z-Wreck." The Z-Wreck is a Vox AC30-style amp that was originally made for country guitar player, Brad Paisley. Fischer's final design, the Songwriter 30, was licensed under Komet Amps. It features four cathode-biased EL84/6BQ5 output tubes and two 12AX7 preamp tubes. The amp's name is derived from its distinct clean sound, which Fischer felt was well-suited for singer-songwriters. Both amplifiers are still in production by their respective manufacturers.

Ken Fischer died from complications due to chronic illness in 2006. John Mark, who was Ken's longtime friend and co-builder, decided to continue building amps under the Trainwreck name. Production of Trainwreck Amps resumed in 2009 with permission from Fischer's family. They are still made in Ken's workshop using his exact specifications. Original Fischer-built Trainwreck amplifiers are known to fetch $25,000 and up. The amps are praised for the simplicity of their design and their touch sensitivity: "The sound's so immediate from the pick to coming out of the amp, [which] opens up a whole new kind of playing", according to Charles Daughtry (Kaylene's owner, who sold all his Dumbles to build a collection of six Trainwrecks).

== Design ==
Ken Fischer designed and built his amps solely as amp heads, not combos. This was done to prolong the service life of the vacuum tubes. Trainwreck amplifiers are housed in their signature polished wood cabinets. By customer request, a custom engraving can be added to the control panel. The amps notably lack a carrying handle; an aesthetic choice made by Ken. They also lack normal serial numbers, instead being engraved with a female name.

Trainwreck amplifiers are renowned for their dynamic overdrive sound and response. They can deliver a wide range of clean signals and high-gain overdrive solely with the manipulation of the guitar's volume knob. Most Trainwreck amps have five control knobs (volume, treble, mid, bass, presence).

== Models ==
Fischer made three different models:

- Express; two EL34 or two 6V6 output tubes. Two 12AX7 preamp tubes and one 12AX7 phase inverter. (Highest-gain amplifier in the lineup. Tonally reminiscent of the Marshall Plexi)
- Liverpool; four EL84 output tubes. Two 12AX7 preamp tubes and one 12AX7 phase inverter.
- Rocket; four EL84 output tubes and a 5AR4 rectifier tube. Two 12AX7 preamp tubes and one 12AX7 phase inverter (Based on the Top-Boost channel of the Vox AC30)

Trainwreck also offers half-power versions of each amp model.

== Notable players ==
- Brad Paisley
- Mark Knopfler
- Matt O'Ree
- Billy Gibbons
- Trey Anastasio
