= Randall Amplifiers =

Electronic amplifier brand for guitars

- Type: Private
- Industry: Musical instruments
- Founded: 1970
- Founder: Don Randall
- Headquarters: 1000 Corporate Grove Dr., Buffalo Grove, IL 60089,
- Area served: Global
- Products: Guitar amplifiers
- Parent: U.S. Music Corp.
- Website: http://www.randallamplifiers.com

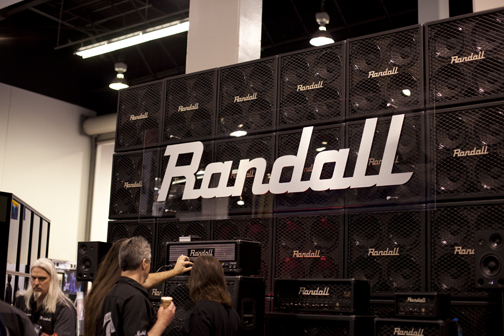
Wall of Randall amps and cabs at the 2014 NAMM Show.

Randall Amplifiers is a manufacturer of solid-state and tube guitar amplifiers. Randall Amplifiers is currently a brand of U.S. Music Corp., a subsidiary of Canadian corporate group Exertis | JAM.

== History ==
After graduating from community college in Santa Ana, California, Don Randall worked as a salesman for a radio supply shop, where he met Leo Fender, who was operating a nearby radio repair shop.

Randall went on to serve in the Army Corps of Engineers, the Signal Corps, and Army Air Forces during World War II. After the war, he took a job as general manager of Radio & Television Equipment Co., a wholesale distributor of electronic components and discovered in 1946 that Fender had begun making a few lap steel guitars and small amplifiers. In 1946, Randall suggested that Radio & Television Equipment distribute Fender's guitars and amplifiers.

Finding commercial success, the Fender Sales Corporation and Fender Electric Instrument Company were established in February 1953, with Randall in charge of sales and distribution. Randall subsequently became vice president and general manager of the Fender Musical Instrument and Fender Sales divisions of CBS.

In 1969, Randall left to found the Randall Amplifier Company in Irvine, California.

Randall sold the company in 1987. In the mid-1990s, it was purchased by U.S. Music Corporation.

== MTS Series ==
In the early 2000s, the company worked with Bruce Egnater of Egnater Amplification to create the MTS (Modular Tube System) series of guitar amplifiers. These involve a single amp head consisting of the power amp and part of a preamp, and slots in the head (one for the RM20 head and combo, two for the RM50 head and combo and RM22 head, and 3 for the RM100 head and RM100C combo, and 12 for the RM1250H) in which you can insert their various preamp modules. These modules are tube preamps in themselves that model various amps, from Vox and Fender style cleans, to Marshall crunch, to all out Mesa Boogie style distortion.

This series also has a rack-mount preamp unit called the RM4 that can hold up to four preamp modules at once.

George Lynch, Kirk Hammett, and Scott Ian have their own signature modules and RM100 heads. The heads both have unique cosmetic differences, and some tonal difference. The only tonal difference in the three modular heads is that George Lynch's Lynch Box RM100LB comes loaded with JJ E34L power tubes, Scott Ian's RM100SI comes loaded with JJ EL34 power tubes, and Kirk Hammet's RM100KH has added depth in the power section for more bottom end than the standard RM100 head.

It was hinted and confirmed during Winter NAMM 2012 that the MTS line of amplifiers would be discontinued and that Egnater would take over the line.

In April 2012, Randall confirmed that the MTS amplifiers were discontinued and would be replaced by a new, high-end line of amplifiers.

== Partnership with Fortin Amps (2011 - 2015) ==
In December 2011, it was announced by the head of Fortin Amplification, Inc. that they would be teaming up with Randall amplifiers to design a new tube amp line based on the Fortin Meathead amplifier. Endorsee Kirk Hammett currently has four of the prototypes, one which he used for the Big 4 show at Yankee Stadium and concerts in India. It was also announced that they will be addressing their current amplifier line, both solid state and tube.

In April 2012, Randall Amplification Brand Director, Joe Delaney (a.k.a. Joetown) introduced Mike Fortin as an exclusive design engineer for Randall Amplification. As the founder of Fortin Amplification, Inc. he has become well-known worldwide for his high gain amplifier designs. His first priority was to design a new multi-channel, 150 watt Kirk Hammett Signature Model Head, and a range of high gain, all tube amplifiers to be manufactured in North America. The new Fortin designed series of Randall amplifiers replaced the discontinued MTS Series.

The collaboration produced a series high gain tube amplifiers such as the 667 and the Thrasher and several signature models. In addition to the Kirk Hammett signature models, Randall released the Ultimate Nullifier EN 120, a signature amp for Anthrax guitarist Scott Ian in 2014. Randall and Fortin also collaborated with The Haunted guitarist Ola Englund and designed a signature amp based on Englund's Fortin "Natas" amplifier called "Satan."

On January 1, 2016, Fortin announced his partnership with Randall had ended the previous day, and he would not be renewing his contract.

== 2014 ==
The Fortin-designed flagship six-channel model 667 head was announced. Additionally, Randall entered the pedal market with the RG13 1 Watt, 3 channel amp/pedal, the Facepunch overdrive, MOR boost pedal, RGOD preamp pedal and RF8 8 button midi pedal.
