= Komet Amps =

Komet Amplification Group is an American manufacturer of boutique guitar amplifiers, based in Baton Rouge, Louisiana. According to Guitar Player magazine, many consider them to be "torchbearer for the late Ken Fischer of Trainwreck Circuits", since the company got its start producing the Fischer-designed Komet K60. Since then the company has begun producing models they developed themselves. The Komet Constellation (long out of production but reissued in 2024-2025) is a unique, 4xEL84 based amp with two independent preamp channels (clean and overdriven) that could be blended seamlessly. The Komet K19 is a 2xEL84 based amplifier with just Volume, Saturation and Tone controls. The K29 is a higher powered, 4xEL84 based version of the same circuit. The Komet Concorde model is a higher gain, more Rock oriented variation of the K60 circuit with solid state rectification. The Komet Aero 33, a single-channel 33-watt amplifier head was a Guitar Player Editors' Pick. Trainwrecks never had their electric components hidden in epoxy however, Komet's Aero 33's resistors and capacitors "are individually concealed in black shrink wrap". In 2009, Premier Guitar reviewed the Komet 19, giving it a 5 out of 5 rating, praising the sound and the "astonishing workmanship".

In early 2017 Komet Amplification introduced their AmbiKab, an innovative, active wet/dry/wet speaker system that allows the user to add effects ("wet signal") to the guitar amp independently of the direct ("dry"). In this system, the amplifier tone remains pure and unmodified, while effects are added through an active, Class D powered stereo loop inside the AmbiKab. This enables the user to place time based effects such as reverb, delay, etc. after the main amplifier, so that they remain unaffected by the amp's distortion. Komet Amplification Group has been granted a US Patent for the AmbiKab.

== Notable players ==
- Trey Anastasio
