= Two-Rock Amplifiers =

American manufacturer of amplifiers

- Company type: Private
- Industry: Musical instruments
- Founded: Rohnert Park, California, United States (1999; 27 years ago)
- Founder: Bill Krinard, Joe Mloganoski
- Headquarters: Rohnert Park, California, United States
- Key people: Eli Lester, Mac Skinner
- Products: Guitar amplifiers
- Website: two-rock.com

Two-Rock Amplifiers is a Rohnert Park, California-based manufacturer of guitar amplifiers co-founded by amp designer Bill Krinard and his partner Joe Mloganoski in 1999. A prominent brand in the boutique amplifier market, Two-Rock's early models were based on Dumble amps like the Overdrive Special, but added such features as spring reverb and effects loops.

Two-Rock has since developed a range of its own designs, generally focusing on clean, high-wattage amps similar to Fender's amps in the 1950s and 1960s. The company's amps are mostly aimed at—and priced for—the top of the pro market.

In 2010, Two-Rock was sold to Premier Builders Guild, which purchased multiple amplifier companies, but Premier struggled and closed in 2016. Long-time Two-Rock enthusiast Eli Lester purchased the brand with Mac Skinner, who had been running its operations as general manager since 2004. The two discarded all the existing inventory and brought back co-founder Krinard to help design new models. Lester's goal was to "make the biggest, most three-dimensional, clean amplifier you can." Most of Two-Rock's models are 100 watts, including their Classic Reverb Signature and Bloomfield Drive models.

With only 25 employees (as of 2025), Two-Rock has declined offers from large retailers to carry their products, with Lester and Skinner preferring to keep the company small. The same team also produces amplifiers for the brand Divided by 13, which Lester and Skinner purchased from the company's founder, Fred Taccone, in 2024.

Notable Two-Rock players include Carlos Santana, Joe Bonamassa, John Mayer, Matt Schofield, Joey Landreth, Ariel Posen, and Eric Johnson.
