= Friedman Amplification =

Guitar amplifier manufacturer

- Company type: Private
- Industry: Guitar amplification
- Founded: 2008, Los Angeles, California, United States
- Founder: Dave Friedman
- Headquarters: Los Angeles, California, United States
- Products: Guitar amplifiers, speaker cabinets, electric guitars, effects pedals
- Website: friedmanamplification.com

Friedman Amplification is an American company that produces guitar amplifiers, electric guitars, and related accessories. Founded in 2008 by Dave Friedman, the company has become a popular boutique amp maker.

== History ==
At the age of 18, Dave Friedman moved from his native Detroit, Michigan, to Los Angeles, where he worked at a store renting high-end instruments to studio musicians. While there, a customer brought in a Soldano SLO-100 modified by Bruce Egnater of Egnater Amplification; an impressed Friedman contacted Egnater about creating a new preamp, which became popular with local studio musicians, and Egnater became Friedman's mentor. By 1993, Friedman had briefly worked for Budda Amplification while on his own he modified amps on request—often by modifying Marshalls with technology he developed at Egnater—and then began creating custom builds. In the process, Friedman gained fans in guitarists like Eddie Van Halen, Steve Stevens, and George Pajon. One custom build, for Billy Howerdel of A Perfect Circle, became the prototype for a line of amps released as Naked Amplifiers. The line proved popular, leading Friedman to start his own company in 2008. Initially named Marsha Amps, he changed it to Friedman Amplification after receiving a cease-and-desist from Marshall. The company quickly found success, as Friedman's time building rigs in Los Angeles helped him establish connections with prominent guitarists like Jerry Cantrell of Alice in Chains, who began using his gear.

In 2014, Friedman signed a deal with Boutique Amps Distribution to build and distribute Friedman's products, with Dave Friedman himself continuing to sign off on all completed amplifiers.

== Products ==
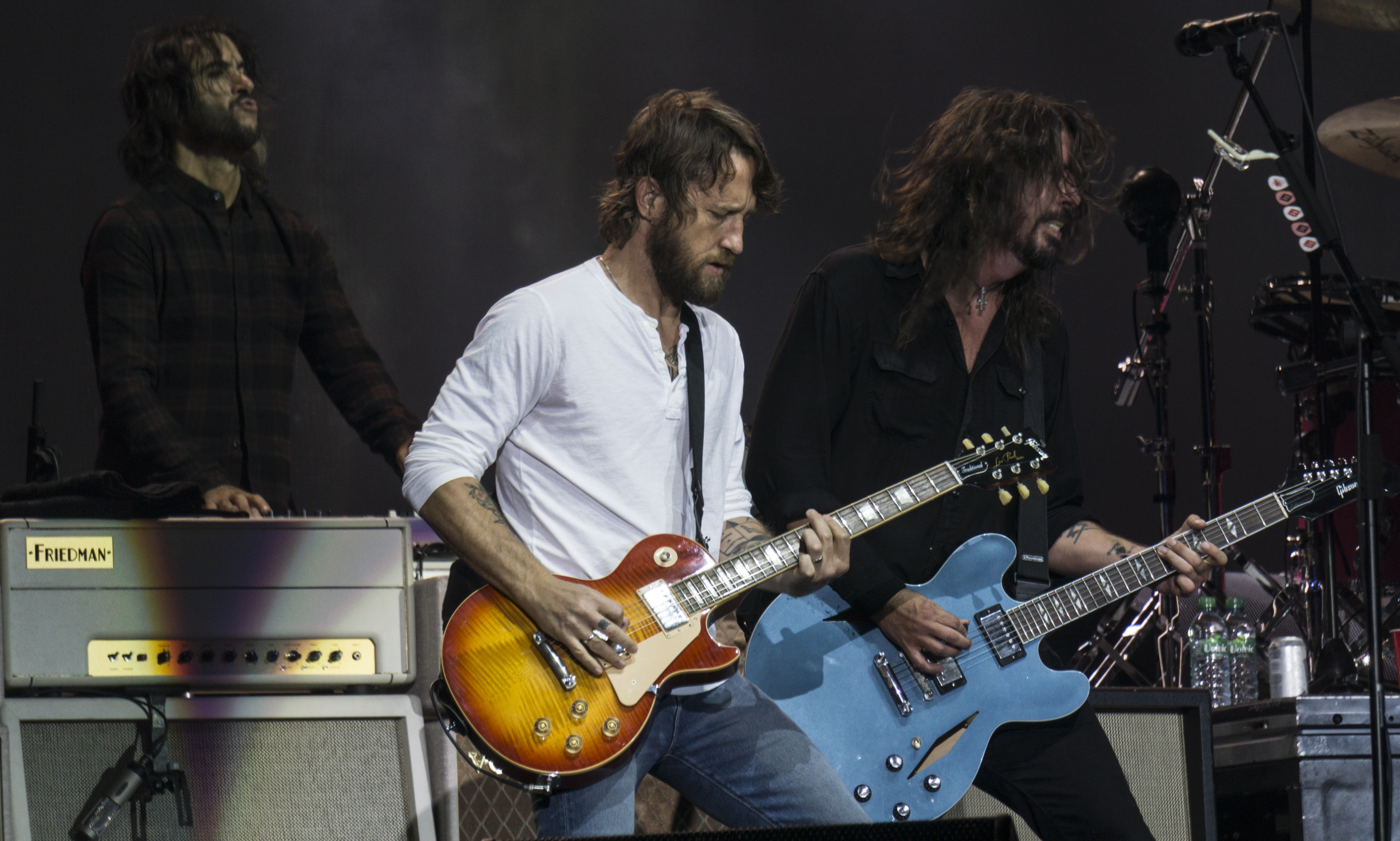
Chris Shiflett playing a BE-100 with Foo Fighters at Lollapalooza 2017

Of his design philosophy, Friedman stated, "Guitar players generally don’t want to hear completely new sounds. They want to hear tones based on a set of sounds from the past but with some variation, like more gain or some other added features." The company's core tone has been described as "supercharged vintage Marshall-inspired."

The company's flagship amp is the BE-100, which was designed to clone the sound of a 1968 50-watt Marshall "Plexi" Super Lead circuit with a "Variac," which was inspired by the tone of Eddie Van Halen. The Dirty Shirley/Twin Sister is the company's take on the tone of 1960s and '70s British classic rock. Friedman produces smaller wattage versions of each amp—the Pink Taco and Little Sister, respectively. In 2021, Friedman released the BE-Mini, a solid state, low-wattage amp based on the BE-100.
