= Soldano Custom Amplification =

Maker of guitar amplifiers

- Company type: Private
- Industry: Amplification
- Founded: Los Angeles, California, United States (1986; 40 years ago)
- Founder: Michael Soldano
- Headquarters: Seattle, Washington, United States
- Key people: Michael Soldano
- Products: Amplifiers
- Website: www.soldano.com

Soldano Custom Amplification is a guitar amplifier manufacturing company, founded in 1986 by Michael Soldano in Los Angeles, California and later relocated to Seattle, Washington. It is mostly known for high-gain amps such as its flagship model, the SLO-100.

== History ==
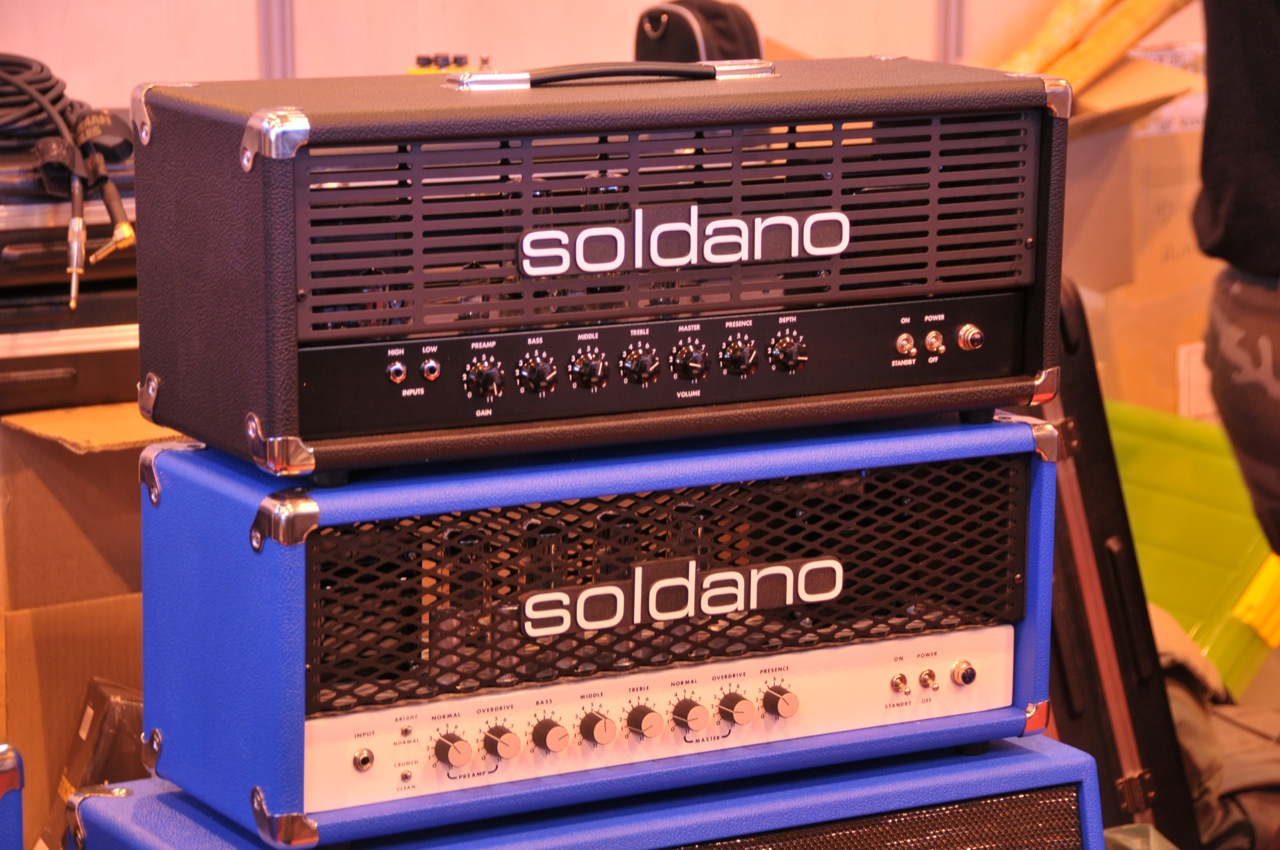
Two Soldano heads: a Avenger Hot Rod (top) and an SLO in custom blue tolex.

Michael Soldano originally worked with technician Bill Sundt at Stars Guitars of San Francisco, modifying amps brought into the shop. Soldano built his first amp, a Fender Bassman clone, with the aid of books discarded by a library. He worked on modifying his version of the Bassman for several years before turning his attention to modifying Mesa/Boogie Mark IIs, which served as the inspiration for what became the Super Lead Overdrive (SLO) 100. Soldano gave a prototype to Howard Leese of Heart while working as a roadie to avoid bankruptcy and soon after received orders from Lou Reed, Michael Landau, and Vivian Campbell. Soldano officially released the SLO 100 in 1987 and sold amps to Eric Clapton and Mark Knopfler, as well as Tommy Kessler of Blondie, Joe Satriani, Steve Vai, George Lynch, and Gary Moore. Guitar Player described the amp as having "a thickness that filled out the high-gain sizzle, and a juicy, touchy-feely playing sensitivity" that especially appealed to lead players.

In 1991, Eddie Van Halen used an SLO 100 (which replaced his Marshall 1959 due to technical issues) for the album For Unlawful Carnal Knowledge and modeled his signature amp, the Peavey 5150, after it.

The Experience Music Project in Seattle contains an area where visitors can play instruments, such as the electric guitar. These rooms contain Soldano amplifiers, along with various Squier guitars (including Stratocaster and Telecaster guitars).

Soldano produced the Supercharger G.T.O. which is a high-voltage valve driven preamp in a floor pedal. The name "G.T.O." derives from the three control knob names—Gain, Tone, Output.

Michael Soldano announced his retirement building amps in 2018, but in 2019 announced he would sell the company to Boutique Amps Distribution and would remain with the company as a designer. In 2020, Soldano released a revamped SLO-100 with added depth control, and a lower-wattage SLO-30 version.

== See also ==
- Bogner Amplification
- Rivera Amplification
