= Boutique amplifier =

Instrument amplifier built with the intention of being better than mass-produced items

Boutique amplifier is a catch-all descriptor for any type of instrument amplifier that is typically hand built with the intention of being much better than the mass-produced variety offered by large companies. In the majority of cases, this is reflected in the price. Sometimes they are clones of older designs, often with minor improvements or alterations in layout or circuit design; sometimes they are new designs altogether.

The boutique term are also used among effect pedals, such as the manufacturer Analog Man.

== History ==
California company Mesa Boogie can lay claim to being perhaps the earliest boutique amp company: their late 1960s Mark series, based on the ubiquitous Fender Princeton "study" amp but "hot-rodded", quickly established a reputation for tone and volume, and was used by, among others, Carlos Santana.

Since the advent of the boutique amp age, larger companies have released reissues of their classic designs, touting their faithfulness to the original sound and the labor-intensive building process.

== Common elements ==
Some common features of boutique amplifiers include point-to-point or turret board construction, heavy-duty chassis, NOS vacuum tubes, and high-end electronic parts and speakers.

== Notable manufacturers ==
- 65amps
- Bogner Amplification
- Carr Amplifiers
- Dr. Z Amplification
- Dumble Amplifiers
- Friedman Amplification
- Fryette Amplification
- Matchless Amplifiers
- Rivera Amplification
- Soldano Custom Amplification
- Trainwreck Circuits
- Two-Rock Amplifiers

== See also ==
- Tube sound
