= Dr. Z Amplification =

Manufacturer of guitar amplifiers

- Founded: 1988; 38 years ago
- Founder: Mike Zaite
- Website: drzamps.com

Dr. Z Amplification is an American manufacturer of boutique guitar amplifiers.

== History ==
The company was founded in 1988 by Mike Zaite, a.k.a. Dr. Z. Zaite grew up the child of a television repairman and learned about vacuum tubes at an early age. He played the drums, and started producing tube amplifiers in his Cleveland, Ohio, shop while maintaining his day job as a medical electronic technician at G.E. As the son of a TV repair shop owner, Zaite learned the ropes at the age of thirteen when he began tinkering with amps and PAs.

His first amplifier was built on a reverb amplifier for a Hammond organ. He sold a few hundred of those, and then re-engineered them so he could build them from scratch. His first commercially made amplifier was the Carmen Ghia, an 18-watt amplifier with nothing but a volume and a tone control, 12AX7 and 5751 pre-amp tubes, and two EL84 output tubes.

In 1990, Zaite provided Joe Walsh with a SRZ-65 model amplifier. In 1994 Zaite received a call to build several more amps for Joe to use on the 1994 Eagles World Tour. Subsequently, he quit his job to focus on amps full-time. The following year, a Guitar Player review of the SRZ-65 boosted the company's public profile in the boutique amplifier market.

Dr. Z collaborated with Ken Fischer of Trainwreck Circuits to build amps for Brad Paisley, who has been using them since 2006, but they were never taken into production, Ken Fischer having died that same year. After the 2010 Tennessee floods, which destroyed huge numbers of musical instruments owned by players of the Nashville music scene, Dr. Z replaced Paisley's destroyed amps, and added the Z Wreck model (whose heart is a Fischer-designed output transformer) to its regular line-up; in 2014, Guitar Player magazine listed it as one of their Editors' Picks.
