= Egnater =

Guitar amplifier manufacturer

Egnater Amplification
- Company type: Private
- Industry: Amplification
- Founded: 1975; 51 years ago, in Detroit, Michigan, United States
- Founder: Bruce Egnater
- Headquarters: Detroit, Michigan, United States
- Key people: Bruce Egnater
- Products: Amplifiers
- Website: www.egnateramps.com/start.html

Egnater is an American company that manufactures boutique guitar amplifiers.

== History ==
The company was founded by Bruce Egnater in Detroit, Michigan. After attending the University of Detroit Engineering School, he opened a guitar and amplifier repair shop in 1975. Bruce's shop (The Amp Lounge) still operates in the Detroit (Berkley) area.

== Amplifier models ==
=== Modular series ===
Egnater produces a series of modular amplifiers (the MOD50/MOD100 and preamplifier M4) which employ a modular architecture, with 2 to 4 vacuum tubes in a footswitchable configuration.

Egnater collaborated with Randall Amplifiers for the Randall MTS series of guitar amplifiers and preamplifiers, which follow the same modular design but use less expensive parts than Egnater's own amplifiers.

=== Tweaker series ===
The Tweaker series are so called for a series of mini-switches that allow for different voicing options, including a choice between British, American, and Vox AC30 tone colors. The series has combo and head models, including a 40-watt combo with a 12-inch speaker.
