= Dumble Amplifiers =

Guitar amplifier manufacturer in Los Angeles, California

- Type: Private
- Industry: Musical instruments, guitar amplification
- Founded: Santa Cruz, California (1969; 57 years ago)
- Founder: Howard "Alexander" Dumble
- Owner: Howard "Alexander" Dumble (1969–2022); Dumble Preservation Society (2022–present)
- Website: dumble.com

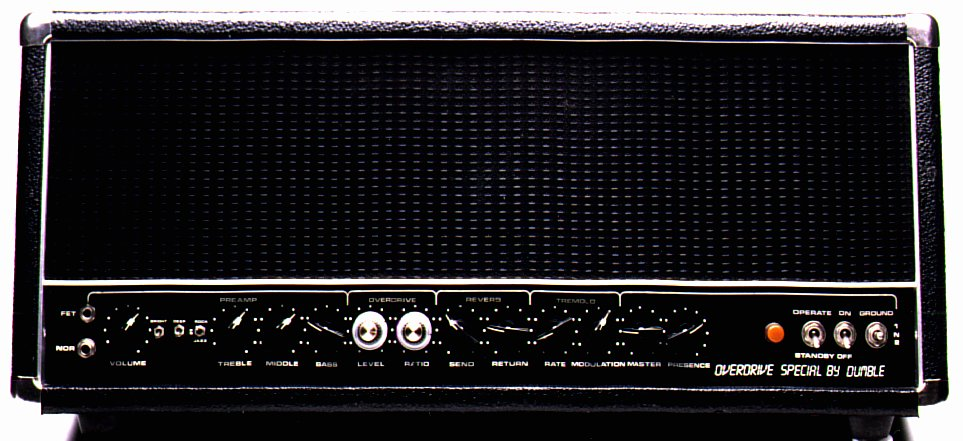
A Dumble Overdrive Special

Dumble Amplifiers was a guitar amplifier manufacturer founded in Santa Cruz, California in the late 1960s. In a one-man operation, Howard "Alexander" Dumble (June 1, 1944 – January 16, 2022) made each amp personally, often tailoring its design to suit the buyer's preferred tone and playing style. Dumble produced only a handful of amps per year—and just 300 in total—primarily for a clientele of well-known musicians, including Robben Ford, Carlos Santana, Larry Carlton, and Stevie Ray Vaughan. Dumble's amplifiers are among the rarest and most expensive boutique amplifiers on the used market, with the brand's flagship Overdrive Special fetching tens of thousands of dollars. Other models have sold for more. Joe Bonamassa put Dumble alongside Fender, Marshall, and Vox as one of the industry's "four quintessential guitar-amp tonalities".

== History ==
=== Early career ===
Howard Alexander Dumble of Bakersfield, California was 12 years old when he began building and selling transistor radios to classmates. From there, he started tinkering with Fender and Gibson amps before building a 200-watt PA system for a local youth baseball team. His own amp based on a Fender Dual Showman followed. Dumble found work after graduating high school in 1962 as a studio and touring musician, but he continued to experiment with amp builds. In 1965 he built an unsolicited amp for his favorite band, The Ventures, and it ended up in the hands of Semie Moseley of Bakersfield-based guitar manufacturer Mosrite, which The Ventures endorsed. Moseley was impressed and hired Dumble to build the company ten amplifiers in a partnership that would only pay him for a month. The Ventures liked the new amps but felt they were "a little too much rock" and declined to use them. Dumble turned down a further partnership and spent the late 1960s as a touring bassist for Buffy Sainte-Marie, who helped him open his first workshop in Santa Cruz, California. In 1969, Dumble produced his first amp model, the "Explosion", based on a modified Fender circuit and began earning a reputation for modding and repairing amplifiers.

Dumble continued to work on his original amp design, with a significant moment of inspiration coming from a show of Robben Ford's in which Ford played a "piggyback" Fender Bassman into a 2x12 speaker cabinet. Dumble's attempt to capture that tone saw his Explosion amplifier morph into the "Overdrive Special" in 1972. At the time, Dumble was staying in Los Angeles with his friend Jackson Browne, and Browne's band was soon playing Dumble's new Ford-inspired amps. As word of his work spread, Dumble built many custom amplifiers for prominent session guitarists and studios, as well as modifying other brand's amps. Common mods included adding a master volume and his "Hot Rubber Monkey" circuit, which was an internally adjustable tone stack placed after the preamp's clipping section to help sculpt the amp's distorted sounds.

By the late 1970s, Dumble was modifying and building higher-gain amps using "cascading" gain stages in a similar way to what Randall Smith of Mesa/Boogie was also doing. Dumble, however, was not interested in selling amplifiers in large numbers, but instead focused solely on getting the best possible sound.

=== Wider recognition ===
By the 1980s, Dumble had become known as a tube electronics master, and his growing list of high end clientele and his "off-the-grid" lifestyle had gained him a reputation as a reclusive amplifier builder to the stars. Robben Ford himself bought his first Dumble Overdrive Special (the amp he inspired) in 1983 and go on to become the guitarist most associated with the brand's amps. During this period, Browne would loan out his own Dumble amps, notably letting Stevie Ray Vaughan play his "Dumbleland Special" bass amp for Vaughan's Texas Flood and In Step albums. Meanwhile, session ace Rick Vito used Dumble amps on an array of hit records, like Browne's "Tender Is the Night" and Bob Seger's "Like a Rock". Guitarists such as Larry Carlton, Eric Johnson, and Steve Lukather also adopted Dumble amplifiers. Dumble eventually became guarded about his designs and started taking steps like covering components in dark epoxy to prevent his circuits from being cloned. Doing so had the added benefit of helping with an amp's durability, as the epoxy kept parts from moving.

In the early 1980s, Dumble began introducing new amplifier models, including the Steel String Singer, Dumbleland and Winterland bass amps, the Overdrive Reverb, and the rackmount Phoenix. Dumble later began offering all his amplifiers at three price points based on the wait time for build and delivery: "Standard" (24 to 36 months), "Express – 180" (180 days), and "Express – 60" with a guaranteed two-month completion time. Dumble also offered telephone consultations for $200 for 10 minutes.

=== After Dumble's passing ===
Dumble's work was limited in the final six months of his life due to health complications. At the time of his death from a stroke in 2022 at age 77, he was preparing builds for Slash and Keith Richards. Robben Ford stated afterwards that Dumble wished for his brand to end with his death: "Most people want to leave behind a legacy, but [Dumble] didn't want that." Joe Bonamassa credited Dumble with inspiring a cottage industry of Dumble-style builders.

In his will, Dumble left the "Dumble" brand name to several close colleagues, including vintage gear expert Drew Berlin and author Michael Doyle, who established the "Dumble Preservation Society" and acquired all of Dumble's copyrights, trademarks, and existing schematics. While founded to safeguard the Dumble legacy and carry on servicing existing Dumble amps, maintaining the brand's trademarks required them to produce new products. In late 2024, the Dumble website was relaunched with a message teasing the release of new products and services. The Dumble Preservation Society then debuted two one-off amps at the 2025 NAMM Show: one an entirely new design and the other a completion of the final build Dumble himself worked on. In 2026, Dumble's website began offering reissues of three of the brand's most famous amplifiers: the Overdrive Special, Tweedle Dee, and MegaPLX. The MegaPLX—of which only three were made, including Dumble's final amp—was also released as a plug-in.

== Acquiring a Dumble amplifier ==
Because of his reclusive nature and methodical, one-man approach to building amplifiers, acquiring a Dumble amp was not easily accomplished. Dumble wished to make amps for only the world's best players and this did not always equate to fame in Dumble's eyes, with Dumble occasionally turning down well-known players. To acquire an amp from Dumble, a player first had to receive a recommendation from someone within Dumble's inner circle. If Dumble was interested, an in-person "audition" followed, although sometimes Dumble would instead ask for a CD. If the player "passed"—Dumble did not always "click" with a player's style or personality—then the meetings would typically turn into jam sessions and even guitar lessons, according to Kenny Wayne Shepherd. Dumble would listen to the player during their meetings and determine how best to design their specific amp depending on their sound and technique. This was typically followed by a "long intuitive working process", which sometimes involved borrowing a player's guitars.

Given his "off-the-grid" lifestyle, Dumble also often preferred alternative payment methods: for example, when Christopher Cross bought an Overdrive Special and two other amps, Dumble's price was a Sears washer and dryer. Robben Ford said Dumble liked being paid in gold. Payment issues would prove problematic when Fender attempted a collaboration with Dumble, in which Fender would produce Twins or Deluxe Reverbs with modifications licensed by Dumble. While Fender produced several prototypes, Fender never managed a way to pay Dumble and the project fizzled. Popular "lore", according to Vintage Guitar, also held that Dumble was an "egotistical curmudgeon" who demanded substantial down payments and would cancel orders if a buyer called to ask when their amp would be ready. Vintage Guitar however also noted that people who knew Dumble described him as warm and friendly. "The Alexander I knew and loved was always in my corner," said Sonny Landreth, who nonetheless acknowledged Dumble could be "quirky" and "difficult" at times, "but genius types like him operate on a different level."

Dumble's amps rarely come up for sale on the secondhand market, fetching huge prices when they do. Dumble himself disapproved of selling his amplifiers used, as the buyer was receiving an amplifier that had been specifically voiced for someone else. Ben Harper said there was a "code of honor and ethics" when it came to purchasing a Dumble secondhand: "you had to make sure it was kosher with him". When Harper first reached out to Dumble about quickly purchasing a used amplifier, Dumble himself sought out potential sellers. Harper ultimately acquired a Super Overdrive Special originally made for the Beach Boys and Dumble fine-tuned it for Harper's needs, a service Dumble did for players who purchased their first model secondhand.

== The Dumble sound ==
Because Dumble often tuned his amplifiers like the Overdrive Special to the needs of the intended player, there is no singular "Dumble sound". Instead, the brand's amplifiers are renowned among players for their dynamic responsiveness and flexibility as well as their tonal palette. More broadly, Dumble's amps are often characterized as "different, more powerful, more durable, more efficient versions of a Fender Deluxe." Dumble had praised the small Deluxe combo for its "great harmonic structure at a small acoustic volume", but explained that he used a much different circuit in his amps to achieve a similarly "comfortable and very musical" tone while delivering more power. Dumble amps are often cited for their sustain and distortion. Vintage Guitar stated the ODS in particular was "widely viewed as the ultimate example of tube-generated overdrive—creamy, touch-sensitive, and with fat, harmonically rich tone". The amp's clean channel has in turn been praised for its "transparent, responsive, 'open' sound." Dumble noted that the technology involved was secondary in his process to an amp's "emotional influence". Henry Kaiser summarized Dumble's amplifiers as "very sophisticated machines for producing a wide variety of tones and distortion colorations." Joe Bonamassa put Dumble alongside Fender, Marshall, and Vox as one of the industry's "four quintessential guitar-amp tonalities".

== Amp models ==
=== Overdrive Special ===
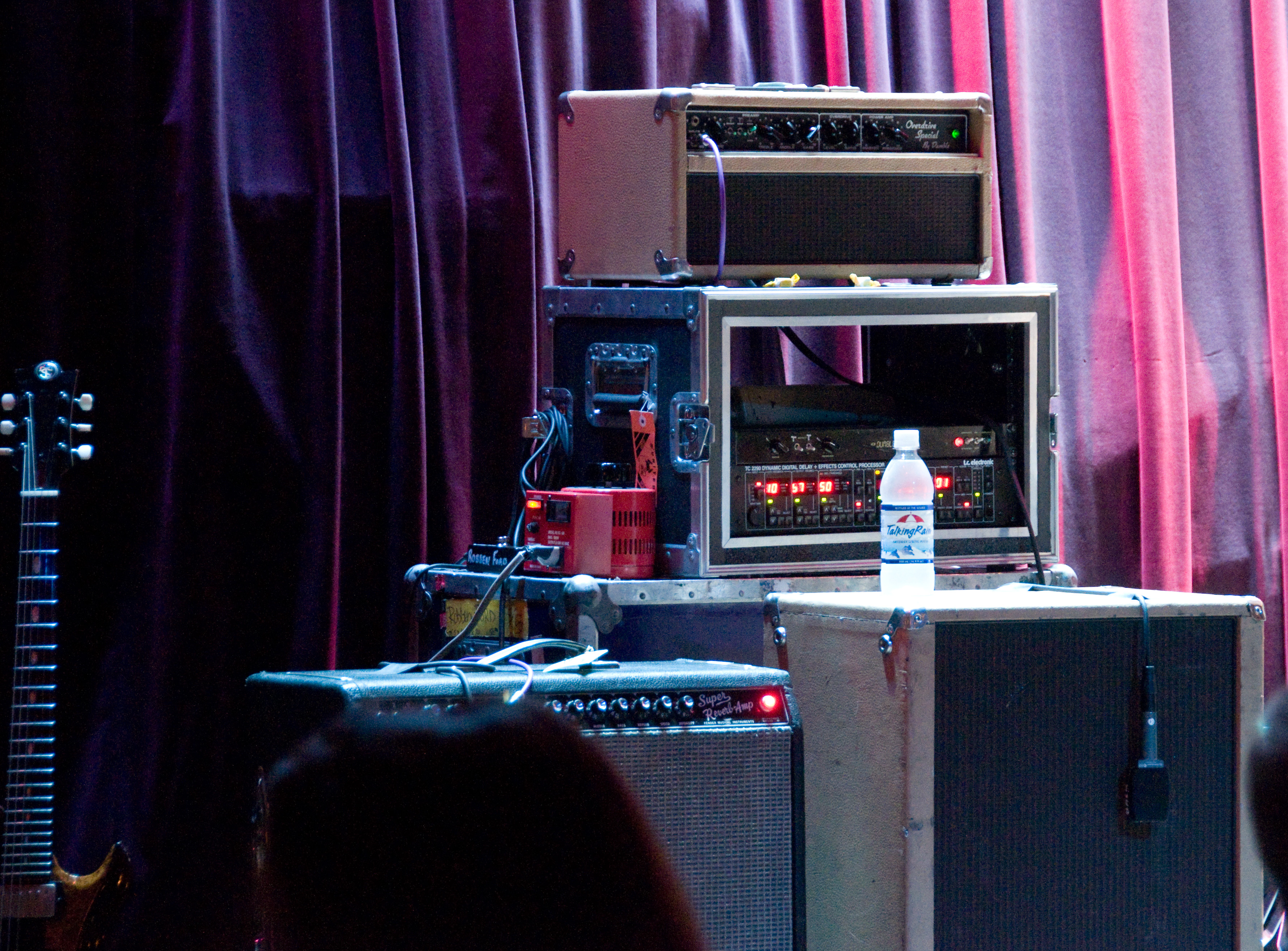
Overdrive Special on guitarist Robben Ford's rig

The Overdrive Special is a two channel amplifier, with a clean channel and a second "overdrive" channel. This overdrive channel "cascades" from the first channel into at least one additional gain stage in the overdrive channel. This means that the clean channel tone stack and gain stages cascade into the gain stage of the overdrive channel, overdriving the overdrive channel. In a sense, the overdrive channel sits "on top" of the clean channel. This is Dumble's most popular model, and consequently is the most frequently seen. That said, the Overdrive Special (ODS) varies from decade to decade, and serial number to serial number. For example, although most ODS amplifiers use 6L6 tubes in the power section (commonly associated with Fender amps), some have EL34 tubes (commonly associated with Marshall amps).

On the other hand, even the many 6L6 versions of the ODS vary considerably. For example, some have a clean channel that stays clean "all the way up to 10" (referencing a gain potentiometer ranging from 1 to 10). Others have a clean channel that starts to "break up" around 3. Some overdrive channels can only reach a minimal amount of breakup, even when dialed up. However, most ODS overdrive channels have a large amount of tube distortion available. Many later versions of the ODS have "HRM" controls on the inside of the amplifier, which is a "hot rubber monkey" tone stack that sits "on top" of the overdrive channel or, in other words, comes after the overdrive channel tube gain stage.

There are commonalities across all ODS amplifiers. For example, the ODS amps are known for their harmonic richness in the overdrive channel breakup, and transparent "open-ness" in the clean channel. Guitarists describe the overdrive channel using terms like sustaining, blooming, and musical—and call the clean channel "fast", "huge", and "responsive". Robben Ford describes the tone of the ODS as having "a perfect sonic curve, the lows are deep and rich but not unclear, it doesn't mush out like some amps will. You have the frequencies there for your use. The mid range [is] punchy and clear and the high end, bright, clear but doesn't hurt your ears. It's loud but it sounds good."

In an interview with Premier Guitar, Ford claims that Dumble told him that the original inspiration for the Overdrive Special came while watching Ford play live in the 1970s at a bar in Santa Cruz. Ford was using an early-60s 6G6-A Fender Bassman, and running an Ibanez Tube Screamer in front of it to overdrive the tubes to breakup. Supposedly, Dumble liked Ford's sound, and while contemplating it had the revelations that led to the original Overdrive Special. Since buying a ODS, Ford has almost exclusively used his original Dumble or an exact clone of it in live performances.

=== Overdrive Reverb ===
An Overdrive Reverb is an Overdrive Special amplifier with an internal Reverb Circuit.

=== Steel String Singer ===
The Steel String Singer is an adjustable single channel "clean" amplifier with reverb.. Fewer than 12 of the original Steel String Singers have been accounted for.

As is typical with Dumble amplifier models, the Steel String Singer (SSS) varies from serial number to serial number. For example, The first SSS (made for Henry Kaiser) has a built-in vibrato circuit. Also, despite its reputation for a clean sound, the earlier SSS (and possibly #7) breaks up when the input gain is turned up or pushed by a strong input signal. Earlier versions also had more complicated phase inversion techniques that had been pioneered in vintage high fidelity amplifiers, and Fender style transformers. Starting with #4, Dumble simplified the phase inversion and gave the amp more negative feedback, which further cleaned up the signal. These updates significantly changed the sound and feel of the circuit, and became standard to the SSS model from #4 and on. The sound the Steel String Singer is most known for is a "clean feedback" effect, in which the amplifier feeds back, even though the signal remains clean. This is most apparent in later SSS models, though a balance of factors contribute to this behavior, and earlier SSS versions and other Dumble models reportedly imitate the effect under certain conditions.

Most common features of every Steel String Singer are control oriented. Every SSS has special high and low cut filters that adjust overall tone late in the circuit. Every SSS has reverb, and every SSS has special coupling techniques and a larger chassis style. Guitarists often characterize its sound as extremely clean and compressed, with dynamic response and a lush reverb circuit. Its EQ is generally considered relatively flat internally, but malleable through the front panel controls and overall responsiveness. There are reportedly "higher highs" and "lower lows" that are not often heard through other amplifiers, and a significant amount of harmonic response to the strength of the input signal.

Notable owners and users of the Steel String Singer include Stevie Ray Vaughan, Eric Johnson, David Lindley, Jackson Browne, John Mayer, Kirk Hammett, and Henry Kaiser.

=== Manzamp ===
A single channel "no frills" combo amplifier, similar in appearance to the tweed Bassman. It was the most expensive amplifier on Dumble's amplifier price sheet in the 90s. Bonnie Raitt is a notable original owner of a Manzamp.

=== Dumbleland ===
One of the earliest Dumble amplifiers, it was also the model which Stevie Ray Vaughan and Double Trouble used for 80% of the guitar tracks on their debut album, Texas Flood, which was recorded at Jackson Browne's studio. Browne was a long time friend of Dumble, and owns some of his earliest amplifiers (including the first Overdrive Specials). Jackson Browne's collection of amplifiers introduced Vaughan to Dumble's amps, and Browne introduced Vaughan to Dumble so that he could buy his first Steel String Singer.

=== Winterland ===
The Winterland was a 300-watt bass amplifier Dumble made in the 1970s.

=== Tonestacks ===
Despite the variability among Dumble tonestack voicing and operation, most Dumble amplifiers have certain controls in common:

1. Bass, Middle, and High frequency potentiometers
2. Two voicings to choose from: Jazz, and Rock
3. Boosts for each frequency–deep, and bright (some have mid boosts)
4. An EQ bypass that bypasses the tonestack entirely (some models have an actual boost rather than a bypass)
5. Overall power amp Presence control, or a Contour tone cut (most have one or the other, but some have neither)

=== Dumbleator ===
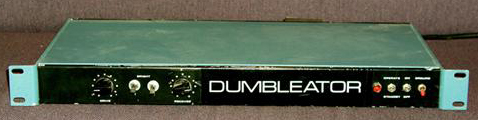
Dumbleator

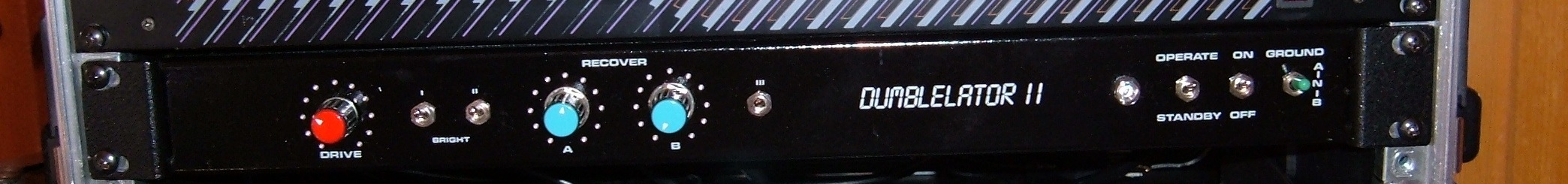
Dumbleator II

Dumble also made a tube-buffered external effects loop called a Dumbleator. A few Dumble amps have a Dumbleator circuit built in, but most have "un-buffered" input jacks that tap directly out of the pre-amp and into the power amp. Dumble likely created this external loop because of the difficulty of fitting effects loop buffering into the amplifier chassis (and the limited use of effects loops for most players). The Dumbleator has separate Send and Receive controls for the effects, and a Bright switch on at least the return. Later models also have a Bright switch on the send control. Dumble also made stereo versions. This effects loop buffering is essentially a cathode follower for the send, into a gain stage for return.

== Notable players ==
- Joe Bonamassa – owns multiple Overdrive Specials, including one formerly owned by Lowell George
- Jackson Browne – original owner of Overdrive Special #1, Dumbleland, and Steel String Singer #2
- Stephen Bruton – owned a low-watt Dumble with 4x10" speakers
- Larry Carlton – Overdrive Special
- Eric Clapton – used various Dumble amps and Dumble modified/refurbished Fenders
- Ry Cooder
- Robben Ford – bought an Overdrive Special in 1983 and had a model custom-built in 1993/4
- Lowell George – used an early custom Dumble head for most of his career
- Kirk Hammett – owned a Steel String Singer
- Ben Harper – owned three Overdrive Specials (50w head + 2×12" Cabinet, 100/50w 1×12" Combo, and a 100/40w Head + matching 1×12" Cabinet;
- Jason Isbell – owned a Dumble-modified Fender Pro and Dumble Overdrive Special
- Eric Johnson – owned a Steel String Singer and Overdrive Special
- Henry Kaiser –owned a 1978 Dumble Overdrive Special; original and current owner of Steel String Singer #1, original owner of SSS #4, and other ODSs
- Sonny Landreth – owned an Overdrive Special
- David Lindley – original owner of Overdrive Special #2 and Steel String Singer #3, and used them in stereo live
- John Mayer owned a Steel String Singer; has a large collection of used Dumble amplifiers
- Carlos Santana – has at least one Overdrive Reverb and a Steel String Singer purchased in the early 2000s, and uses Bludotone clones of his Dumbles live besides his Mesa/Boogie amps
- Kenny Wayne Shepherd – owned a Dumble-modified Tweed Deluxe, nicknamed "Tweedle-Dee"
- Mark Tremonti
- Keith Urban – Overdrive Special
- Stevie Ray Vaughan – owned Steel String Singers #7 and #8, and had an association with #9

== See also ==
- Hermida Audio Zendrive, an overdrive pedal designed to replicate the sound of a Dumble amplifier
- Two-Rock Amplifiers, one of the first companies to clone Dumble amps
