= Kirk Hammett =

American guitarist (born 1962)

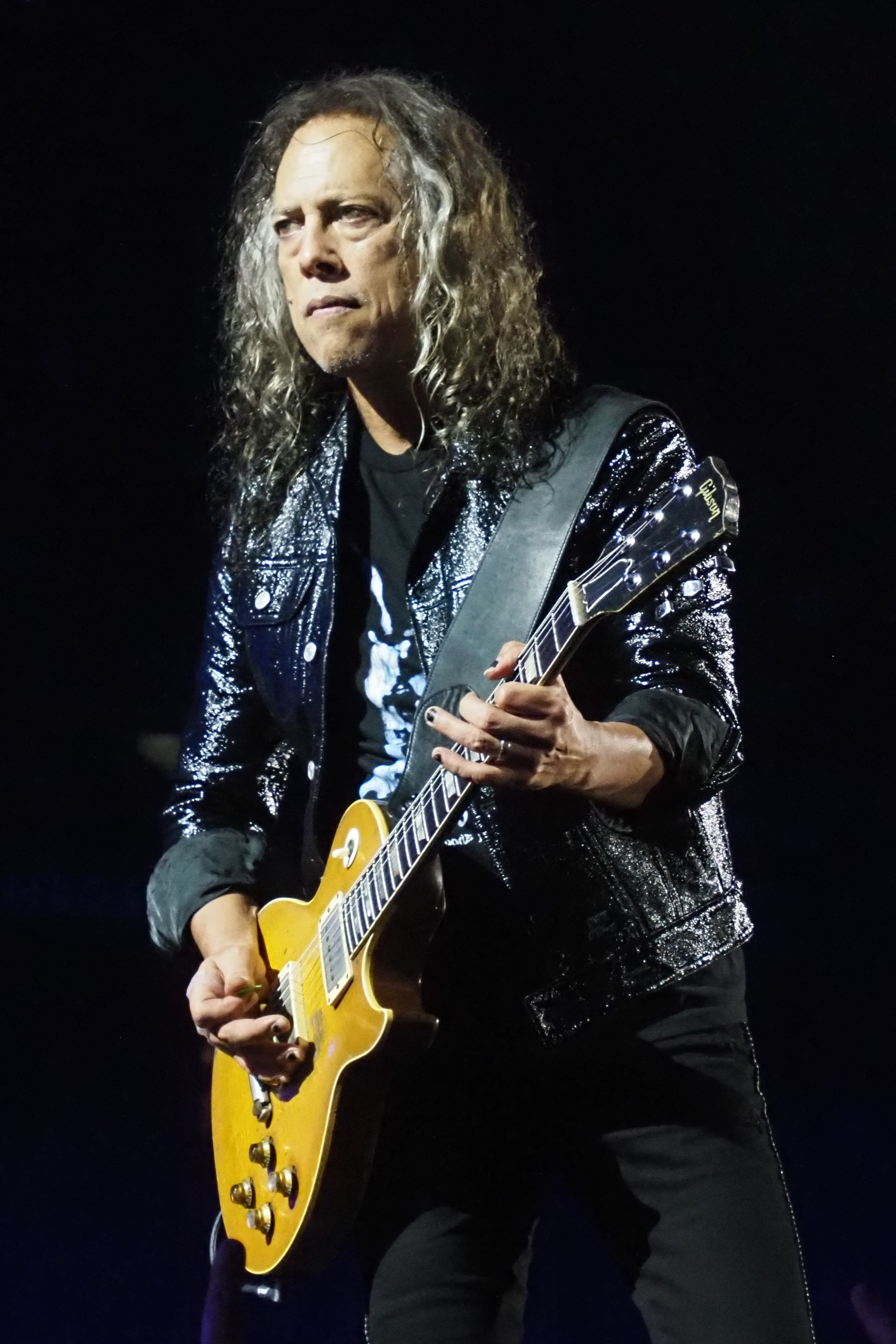
- Hammett performing with Metallica in 2025

Background information
- Born: Kirk Lee Hammett; November 18, 1962 (age 63); San Francisco, California, U.S.
- Genres: Heavy metal; thrash metal
- Occupation: Musician
- Instrument: Guitar
- Years active: 1979–present
- Label: Blackened
- Member of: Metallica
- Formerly of: Exodus; Spastik Children

Kirk Lee Hammett (born November 18, 1962) is an American musician. Hammett has been the lead guitarist of heavy metal band Metallica since 1983; prior to joining Metallica, he co-formed thrash metal band Exodus in 1979. In 2023, Hammett and Metallica bandmate James Hetfield were co-ranked 23rd on Rolling Stone's list of Greatest Guitarists of All Time. In 2009, Hammett was ranked number 15 in Joel McIver's book The 100 Greatest Metal Guitarists.

== Early life ==
Hammett was born on November 18, 1962, in San Francisco, California, and raised in the town of El Sobrante. He is the son of Teofila "Chefela" Hammett (née Oyao) and Dennis L. Hammett (a merchant mariner). His mother is of Filipino, specifically Cebuano, descent and his father was of English, German, Scottish, and Irish ancestry, although he has referred to his father as a "a full-blooded Irishman who liked to drink and liked to scrap. He was always fighting people, even fighting his friends. He would get together with my uncles and it was just one big fucking toxic soup of masculinity, and that’s what I came out of."

He attended De Anza High School in Richmond, California. While attending De Anza High School, he met Les Claypool of Primus, and they remain close friends.

Hammett has a well-known passion for horror movies that stretches back to the late 1960s. After spraining his arm in a fight with his sister at age five, Hammett's parents placed him in front of the television. It was during this time that he first watched The Day of the Triffids. After that, Hammett found himself drawn to his brother's Frankenstein figures and began spending his milk money on horror magazines. For the better part of the next decade, Hammett dove deep into the horror scene.

Hammett began showing an interest in music after listening to his brother Rick's extensive record collection (which included Jimi Hendrix, Led Zeppelin, and UFO). He began selling his horror magazines to buy music records, which led him to properly picking up the guitar at age 15. Hammett's first guitar was (in his own words) a "wholly unglamorous" Montgomery Ward catalog special, which was accompanied by a shoebox (with a four-inch speaker) for an amp. After purchasing a 1978 Fender Stratocaster copy, Hammett attempted to customize his sound with various guitar parts before eventually buying a 1974 Gibson Flying V.

== Career ==
=== Exodus (1979–1983) ===
Hammett's musical interests eventually drew him into the fledgling thrash metal genre. In 1979, he formed the band Exodus at the age of sixteen, along with vocalist Paul Baloff, guitarist Tim Agnello, bassist Geoff Andrews, and drummer Tom Hunting. Hammett named Exodus after the Leon Uris novel of the same name, and played on the band's 1982 Demo and its successor Die By His Hand from 1983. Exodus was an influential band in the Bay Area thrash movement. During the Exodus phase Hammett took lessons from Joe Satriani who was based in Berkeley, California at the time.

=== Metallica (1983–present) ===
In 1983, Metallica traveled to the east coast to record its debut album, Kill 'Em All. Due to lead guitarist Dave Mustaine's substance abuse and violent tendencies, he was fired shortly after their arrival, and would eventually form the band Megadeth. Hammett received a phone call from Metallica on April 1, and flew out to New York for an audition on April 11, the same day Mustaine was let go. Vocalist/guitarist James Hetfield said: "The first song we played was "Seek and Destroy", and Kirk pulled off this solo, and it was like ... things are going to be alright!". Hammett was instantly asked to join the band.

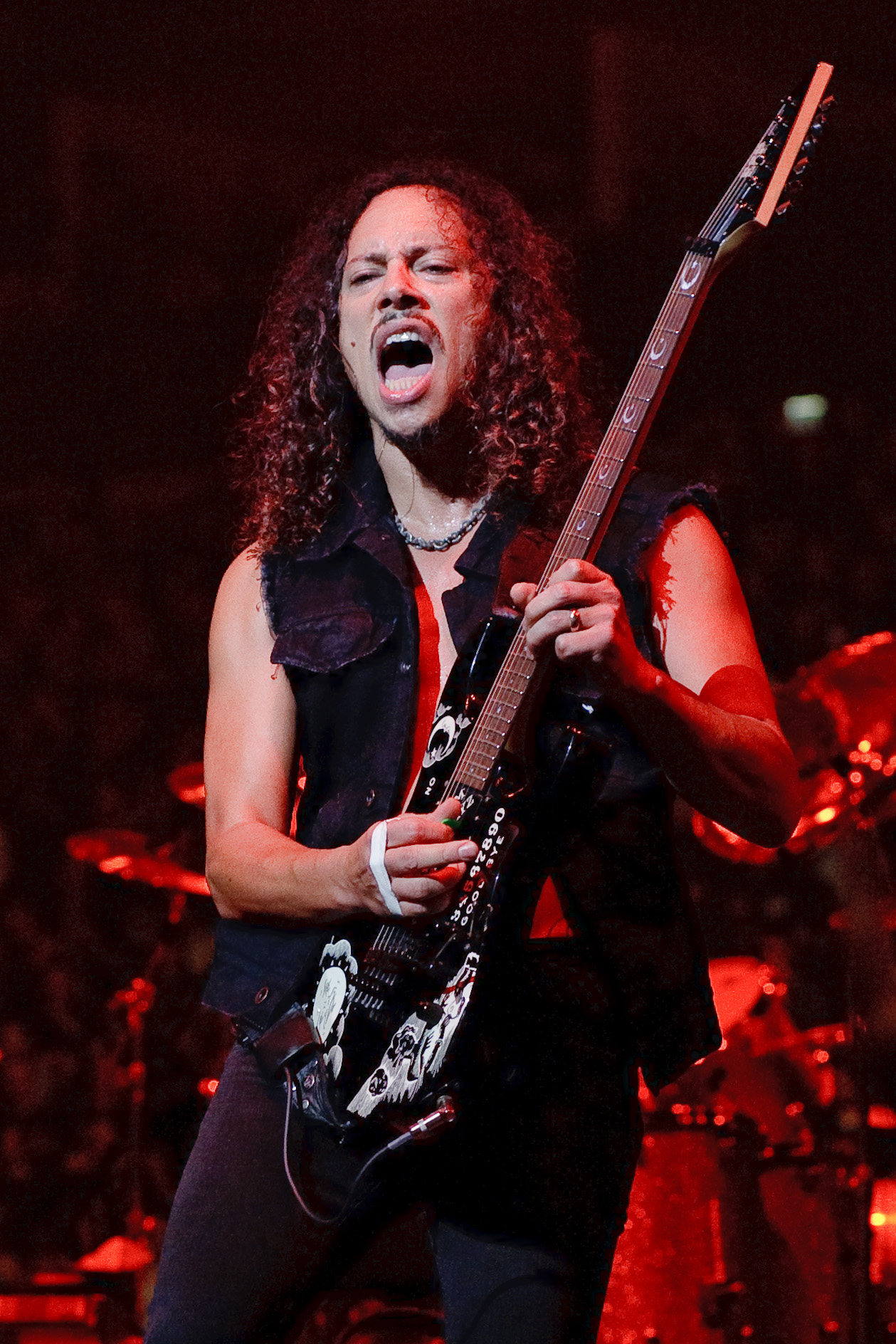
Hammett performing live in London in 2008

Hammett has written a number of riffs for Metallica since Ride the Lightning (the band's second album). One of his riffs was used on "Enter Sandman" - which went on to become one of Metallica's most popular songs. It was the first track and the first single on the band's self-titled album (also known as The Black Album), and was ranked 399th on Rolling Stone's list of The 500 Greatest Songs of All Time. The bridge for "Creeping Death" was originally an Exodus riff that Hammett took with him to Metallica.

In 1986, during the band's European leg of their tour to support Master of Puppets, the group had a dispute over sleeping arrangements on their tour bus. The outcome of the dispute was decided by a card draw, which Cliff Burton won by picking the Ace of Spades. Once the draw was completed, Burton looked at Hammett and said "I want your bunk", to which Hammett complied, saying that he might be able to sleep better in the front of the bus anyway. In the early hours of the following morning, Metallica's tour bus slid off the road and overturned in Sweden. Burton was thrown through the window of the bus, which fell on top of Burton and subsequently killed him. Hammett has stated in an interview that he once thought that it easily could have been him who was killed instead, since Burton was sleeping in what was considered to be Hammett's bunk. In Kirk's own words: "You know to this day I just think, it could have been me or it couldn't have been me but ... it's never left me to this day."

Between the end of touring (and promoting) the Black Album and the start of touring in promotion of Load, he studied at San Francisco State University, focusing on film and Asian arts. Hammett went through a "blues period" around this time - which had some influence on Metallica's Load and Reload albums. He also began listening to a lot of jazz music. Hammett described this period of his life as "great education", because he was able to discover where all of his own rock influences had gotten their own guitar licks. However, even though jazz music had a profound effect on his improvisation skills and solos, Hammett felt that he was delving too deep into the genre. Since Death Magnetic, Hammett has gone back to being "primarily" a metal guitarist, but some of his influences of jazz and blues music still remain.

Hammett wanted to have guitar solos on Metallica's 2003 album, St. Anger, but drummer Lars Ulrich and producer Bob Rock thought that the solos did not sound right in the songs. He later admitted himself, "We tried to put in solos but they sounded like an afterthought so we left them out". Recording for St. Anger was halted in 2001 so that Metallica frontman James Hetfield could enter rehab for alcohol abuse. Due to tensions within the band (which were well-documented in the Metallica documentary Some Kind of Monster) at the time, Hammett expressed interest in working on a solo album. According to Hammett, if he ever worked on a solo album, it would not be "super-duty" heavy metal, and may include some classical guitarists. When he was asked about his experiences of recording St. Anger, Hammett said:

Honestly, I was ready to start working on a solo album. I had a bunch of music I was sitting on. I was going to ask Lars [Metallica's drummer] to play drums on it.

On April 4, 2009, Hammett, along with Metallica bandmates Lars Ulrich, James Hetfield, and Robert Trujillo and former Metallica bandmates Jason Newsted and the deceased Cliff Burton, were inducted into the Rock and Roll Hall of Fame. In 2009, Hammett provided the foreword to British author Joel McIver's book To Live Is to Die: The Life and Death of Metallica's Cliff Burton.

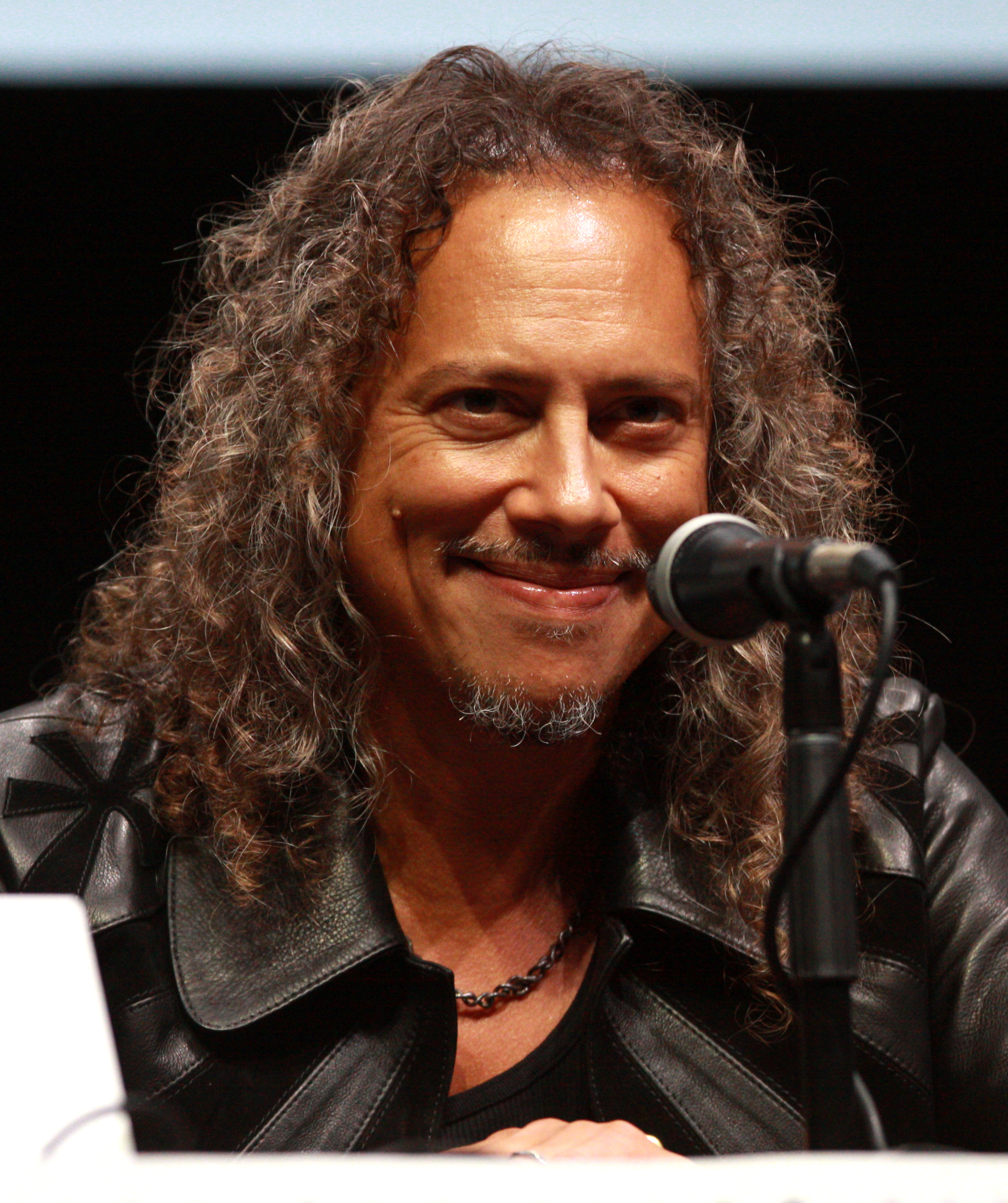
Hammett in 2013

In April 2015, Hammett admitted to losing his phone - which contained 250 new "ideas" for Metallica's upcoming studio release. The incident happened about six months prior to the admission (around November 2014). The phone was not backed up and Hammett can only remember eight out of the 250 "ideas" he had. On the subject, Hammett said:

For me, music comes at all times of the day. When I get a riff, sometimes it's a complete riff and I can just play it and there it is, sometimes it's half a riff and I have to tweak it. Sometimes it's just a rhythm or a note selection. Or sometimes it's just something that I hum in my head. But it can come from anywhere, and I put it on my phone, and I make sure the phone is fucking backed up.

In 2016, Hammett provided the foreword to author Greg Prato's book German Metal Machine: Scorpions in the '70s.

On February 8, 2022, it was announced that Hammett would release an extended play entitled Portals. Said to be inspired by "classical music, soundtracks, horror movies and maybe a little Ennio Morricone", the EP is his solo debut and was released on April 23, 2022.

=== Other appearances ===
He also appeared on the Kichigai EP by punk band Septic Death. He played additional lead guitar on the title track.

Hammett can be seen in the background in Primus' "John the Fisherman" video fishing off of Les Claypool's boat. Hammett has been friends with Primus bassist and lead vocalist Les Claypool since childhood. Claypool even auditioned for Metallica after the tragic death of Cliff Burton.

Hammett played guitar on the track "Satan" with Orbital for the Spawn: The Album soundtrack released in July 1997.

Hammett plays a guitar solo on Pansy Division's song "Headbanger" which appears on the EP For Those About to Suck Cock.

In 2005, Hammett was featured playing the guitar roles on the Carlos Santana track "Trinity" alongside steel-pedal guitarist Robert Randolph. Santana personally asked Hammett to contribute to his then-upcoming album All That I Am. Hammett previously worked with Santana in 2001 at a live show benefit in San Francisco. Metallica had also invited Santana into the studio while recording St. Anger.

In 2006, Hammett voiced himself on The Simpsons ("The Mook, the Chef, the Wife and Her Homer"). He also provided various voices on the Adult Swim show Metalocalypse, including a two fingered fan ("The Curse of Dethklok"), The Queen of Denmark ("Happy Dethday"), and a Finnish barkeep ("Dethtroll").

Hammett also appeared as a guest in an episode of Space Ghost Coast to Coast titled "Jacksonville", alongside fellow Metallica member James Hetfield.

He appeared as a guest guitarist on K'Naan's 2006 song "If Rap Gets Jealous" off of the Troubadour album.

After performing a set with Metallica at Bonnaroo in June 2008, Hammett played one song with My Morning Jacket and a couple songs with the annual Superjam collaboration, which also included Les Claypool and members of Gogol Bordello playing primarily Tom Waits songs.

Hammett is one of the main characters in Guitar Hero: Metallica, along with the rest of the current line-up of Metallica.

In 2011, Hammett appeared in an episode of Jon Benjamin Has a Van as an actor and guitarist.

Hammett collaborated with Cindy Blackman Santana and Vernon Reid from Living Colour on Evolution Revolution, a track from the former's 2020 album Give the Drummer Some.

Hammett has appeared as himself, representing the character Kevin's conscience, in the 2022 American teen comedy-drama Metal Lords.

In May 2023, Hammett performed at the Jeff Beck tribute concerts held at the Royal Albert Hall in London, sharing the stage with Eric Clapton, Rod Stewart, Ronnie Wood, Billy Gibbons and Johnny Depp among others.

Hammett fell off the stage during a concert in Dublin on June 19, 2026. The accident happened while the band was performing "Seek & Destroy". Hammett joked about the incident on social media, calling it "Slip and Destroy".

== Book ==
On October 1, 2012, Abrams Image published Hammett's first book, Too Much Horror Business (a collection of photos detailing Hammett's lifelong love of monster movies and horror memorabilia). Hammett has said that the book is "basically" all of the horror memorabilia he has managed to amass over the last 30 years. In an interview with Guitar World, Hammett said that he has such a huge horror collection and thought it was the right time to share it with everyone. The 228 page hardcover features more than 300 images of Hammett's horror collection. Among these images are the costumes from the Bela Lugosi movies White Zombie and The Black Cat (which also starred Boris Karloff), original movie posters (ranging from Nosferatu to Hellraiser), rare horror-themed toys (including the 'Great Garloo' and 'Frankenstein Tricky Walkers'), movie props (including the 'Dr. Tongue' zombie from George A. Romero's Day of the Dead), original Basil Gogos Famous Monsters art, and fantasy paintings by Frank Frazetta. In addition to the images from Hammett's horror collection, Too Much Horror Business contains three conversations with the guitarist about his childhood, the nature of his horror collection, and the connection between Metallica's music and horror movies. On the book, Hammett has been quoted saying:

This is my gift to all the other horror nerds out there who are just like me. It's (the book) been made with great love for all the many characters and movies which guided me through childhood, into adulthood and which still keep me on track today.

== Kirk Von Hammett's Fear FestEvil ==
Kirk Von Hammett's Fear FestEvil is an annual horror convention created by Kirk Hammett. The first Fear FestEvil took place at the Regency Ballroom in San Francisco - over a three-day period (from February 6–8, 2014). Hammett was inspired to create his own horror convention after experiencing the enjoyment of making his "crypt" at the Orion Music + More festival. The convention features live music, signings, interactive displays, vending, live talks, and guest appearances. At the 2014 event, guests included Sara Karloff (daughter of actor Boris Karloff), Bela G. Lugosi (son of actor Bela Lugosi), make-up artist Gregory Nicotero (who worked on George A. Romero's Day of the Dead), actor Tom Savini (who portrayed Sex Machine in From Dusk till Dawn and worked on many of George A. Romero's movies), Heather Langenkamp (who portrayed Nancy in Wes Craven's A Nightmare on Elm Street), Kane Hodder (who portrayed Jason Voorhees in the Friday the 13th film series), and Haruo Nakajima (of Godzilla fame). Other guests in attendance included Hammett's former band Exodus, Death Angel, Orchid, Metallica band member Robert Trujillo, Richard Christy, Stephen Perkins, Slash, and Scott Ian. Exodus played on-stage with Carcass on the Friday, whilst Death Division and Orchid played before Death Angel on the Saturday. Hammett joined Exodus and Death Angel on-stage for their encores.

The second annual Fear FestEvil took place between April 10–12, 2015, at the Rockbar Theater in San Jose, California. Meshuggah headlined the event, whilst High on Fire, Blues Pills, Agnostic Front, and Asada Messiah also made appearances. Orchid also made a second appearance at the Fear FestEvil. On April 10, VIPs were able to attend the Dinner and Murder Mystery - along with Hammett - at the Winchester Mystery House.

== Personal life ==
Hammett has been married twice. His first marriage to Rebecca lasted three years, having ended in 1990, during the recording of Metallica. His second marriage to Lani lasted from 1998 to 2020, with Hammett filing for divorce back in 2012. They have two sons. He is currently engaged to Monikka De La Zerda. They have a child together. He resides in Sonoma, California, and Hawaii.

In addition to playing guitar and collecting horror memorabilia, Hammett's hobbies include reading comic books and surfing.

=== Substance abuse ===
At one point in his life, Hammett spent a "lot of money" on drugs. Hammett has said that he used drugs because he thought they would be fun. During the Damaged Justice tour, he had a cocaine addiction. Hammett eventually pulled out of the addiction because cocaine made him feel depressed, but he relapsed during the Load era. One of the reasons Hammett said he spent a lot of money on comic books is because he finds them to be a more enjoyable and healthier alternative to drugs. He also smoked heroin a few times but "didn't like it".

=== Politics and environmentalism ===
Although the other members of Metallica do not speak publicly about their politics, Hammett has expressed his disagreement with statements by Donald Trump. In an interview with Billboard magazine in December 2016 (one month after Trump's first election), Hammett said that he was "just waiting to get into a personal Twitter war with (Trump)." In the same interview, Hammett stressed the importance of the fight against global warming, which Trump has claimed is a hoax.

== Equipment and techniques ==
Hammett is known for consistently taping sections of his right (picking) hand in order to protect his skin from abrasions from his use of palm muting and fast picking techniques over lengthy tour cycles.

=== Guitars ===
Hammett's touring guitars over the years have included:

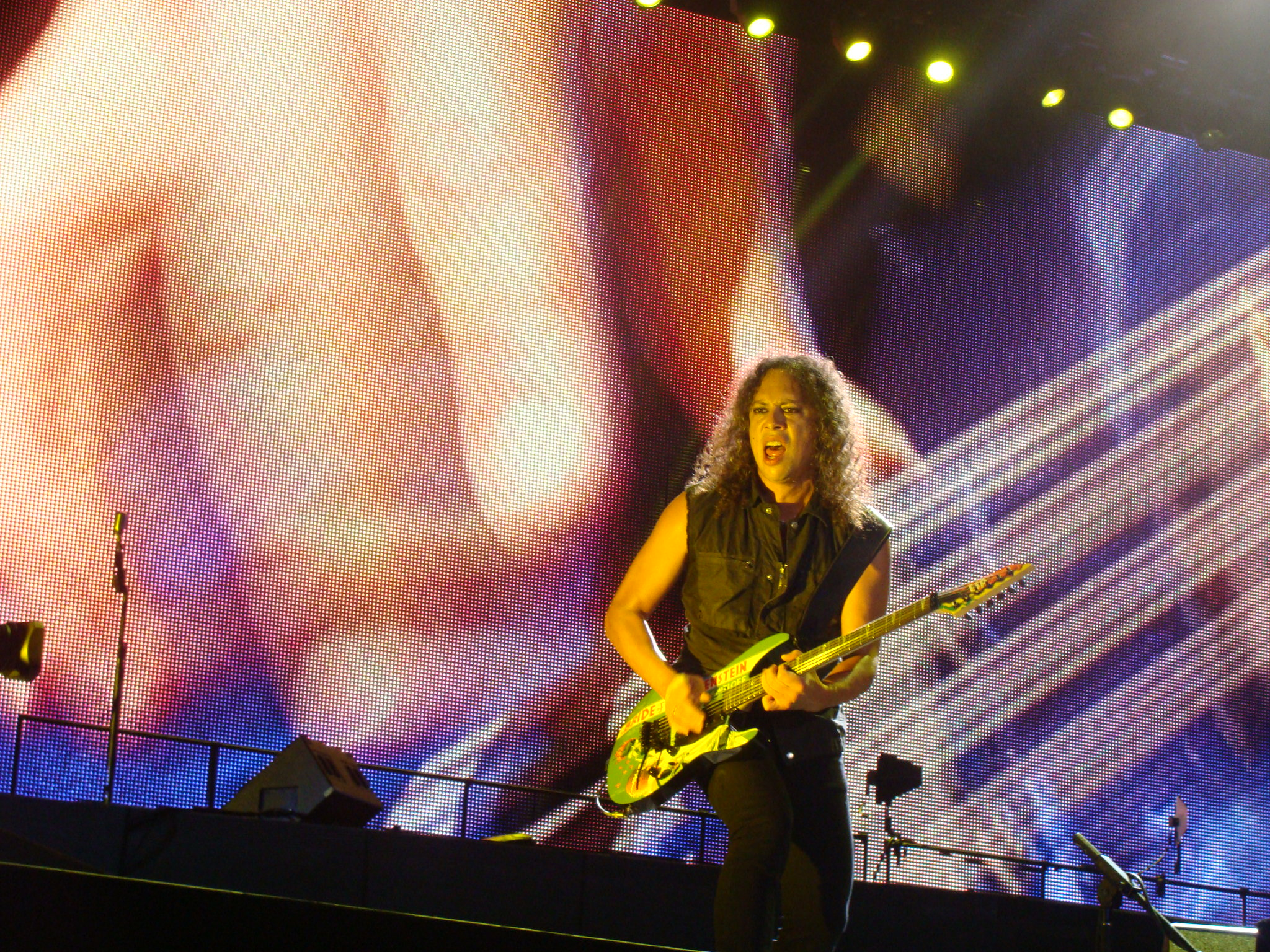
Hammett playing at the Morumbi stadium in São Paulo, 2010

- ESP MM-250/MM-270 "Zorlac" – Hammett's first custom-made instrument by ESP Guitars was the precursor to the whole KH series. Featuring vertical skulls and crossbones as opposed to the horizontal ones featured on today's KHs, and an upside down Jackson Guitars style headstock which is what Hammett originally intended. The threat of potential lawsuits from Jackson Guitars over this model meant it was withdrawn as a custom shop option forever. As a result, the headstock was changed to the typical modern era ESP style, but flipped upside down, the inlays were rotated 90 degrees and those became the modern-day KH series.
- ESP KH-2 MM-290 "Skully" – Hammett's main touring guitar and first modern-era KH model. This signature model is based upon the modifications he made to his original ESP custom model.
- ESP M-II Standard – with EMG and Seymour Duncan pickups. Hammett used this a lot in the studio and live.
- ESP KH-2 "Bride of Frankenstein" – New for 2009.
- ESP KH-4 Chrome – New for 2009. A remake of his former KH-4 guitar, with a chrome pickguard, chrome hardware, and chrome EMG pickups.
- ESP MII-NT – New for 2009. It is custom finished with occult-themed graphics.
- ESP KH-2 M-II "Boris Karloff Mummy" #I – This has been Hammett's favourite guitar for many years. It features a Boris Karloff Mummy I graphic which Hammett owns the rights to. It will not be released by ESP. Hammett has two of these guitars, one with Eye of Horus inlays and the other with hieroglyphics inlays.
- ESP KH-2 M-II "Ouija" – This guitar contains two spelling errors. It sports the words "WILLIAM FUED TALKING BAARD SET" but it in fact should say "WILLIAM FULD TALKING BOARD SET". Hammett also now plays a white version of this guitar on tour.
- ESP KH-2 M-II "Greenburst" A standard KH-2 with a custom green sunburst finish, green inlays, and green logo.
- ESP KH-3 Eclipse – Pushead Spider graphic. It is taken from a classic Les Paul Jr. shape with a Floyd Rose vibrato and EMG pickups.
- ESP Flying V copy – Cherry Red with white pickguard and gold hardware. Hammett uses this live mostly for the song "Seek & Destroy".
- ESP Michael Schenker Flying V
- ESP VIPER Baritone – Used for performances of "The Unnamed Feeling".
- Gibson 1968 Les Paul Custom – Mostly on ballads such as "Fade to Black" and "Welcome Home (Sanitarium)".
- Gibson Les Paul Standard – Used on songs from St. Anger.
- Ibanez RG – Used during the Wherever We May Roam American and European tour. It was used as a stunt guitar and for Deep Purple covers.
- Jackson Randy Rhoads Model RR1T – Custom made specifically for Hammett. It is usually tuned one step down from standard tuning, and used for songs like "Sad but True" and "The Memory Remains".
- TC Customs Death Magnetic Flying V – Used on the World Magnetic Tour.
- Teuffel Birdfish – Designed and produced by German guitar designer/builder, Ulrich Teuffel. The model is limited (500 made) and is made to amplify sound using various pickups. This guitar is used live for "The Judas Kiss".
- Teuffel Tesla

On the 25th anniversary of Metallica's debut album Kill 'Em All, Hammett appears on the cover of Feb. 2008's Guitar World sporting his new custom ESP. This model is the KH20, the 20th anniversary model from ESP.

In 2014, Hammett purchased "Greeny", a 1959 Les Paul formerly used by Gary Moore and Peter Green; using it on tour as of 2015 when playing a cover of Thin Lizzy's version of "Whiskey in the Jar".

=== Amplifiers and cabinets ===
Throughout Metallica's career, Hammett has used a range of different amplifiers. For the first two albums, he used Marshall amplifiers and cabinets, with occasional effects. For the recording of Metallica's third album, Master of Puppets (1986), he and James Hetfield bought a Mesa/Boogie Mark IIC+ amplifier, and used Mesa/Boogie Dual Rectifier heads. Even when he made his move to Randall Amplifiers in 2007, he still used Mesa/Boogie amplifiers in his setup, and still does to this day. He currently uses two rack-mounted Dual Rectifier two-channel heads in tandem with his Randalls.

In September 2007, Randall Amplifiers announced a partnership with Hammett to design a line of signature amplifiers, heads, combos and preamp modules.

In December 2011, it was announced by Fortin Amps that they would team up with Randall to start a new line of tube amplifiers based on the Fortin Meathead amplifier. Hammett is currently using a prototype of the amplifier that he used for the Big 4 show at Yankee Stadium and for all of the shows in India and Asia, and was recently sent a second prototype.

- Mesa/Boogie Rackmounted Dual Rectifier (x2)
- Randall RM100KH Signature Model (modified version of the MTS series RM100) (x1)
- Randall/Fortin Prototype head (x2)
- Randall 4x12 Cabinets (x4)
- Randall/Fortin 4x12 Cabinet

=== Effects ===
To avoid problems with pedals being damaged during live performances, Hammett keeps his effect pedals in a rack along with his amplifiers. His guitar technician controls them through a pedalboard sidestage. The pedal controller allows him to change between different effect pedals and amplifiers.

Although using a wah-wah pedal since Kill ‘Em All, the release of The Black Album, saw prominent usage in Hammett's playing thereafter. In 2008, Jim Dunlop started working in partnership with Hammett to create a signature wah-wah pedal, the KH95. In 2022 on an interview with Rick Beato, he claimed to own "around 200" wah-wah pedals, citing his favorite one to be the Dunlop Dimebag Cry Baby From Hell.

Hammett said that the Ibanez Tube Screamer has been an essential part of his sound since he was a teenager, but it was not versatile enough, which started him searching for a better pedal. In 2012, he co-founded KHDK Electronics with sound designer David Karon, hiring Antonin Salva as chief engineer, based in Prague. The company makes guitar pedals in Paducah, Kentucky. They began developing pedals and trying out prototypes. In September 2015, the company launched its first series of pedals, surprising the industry.

- TC Electronic G-Major 2 effects processor
- Boss NS-2 Noise Suppressor
- Dunlop KH95 Kirk Hammett Signature Crybaby
- Ibanez Tube Screamer (Keeley modified)
- DigiTech Whammy WH-1
- Line 6 DL4 Delay Modeler
- Line 6 MM4 Modulation Modeler
- Shure UR-4D Wireless Receiver
- GCX Audio Switcher
- Voodoo Lab Ground Control Pro floorboard
- DBX 1074 Quad Gate
- MXR Eddie Van Halen Flanger
- MXR Bass Octave Deluxe
- DigiTech Space Station
- ToneBone Hot British Tube Distortion

=== Accessories ===
- Ernie Ball "Power Slinky" strings (.11-.48)
- Jim Dunlop Dunlop Jazz III Kirk Hammett (Green, purple sparkle, black sparkle)
- Levy Custom Straps
- "Kirk Hammett" - branded boutique custom straps
- Peterson Strobe 420 Tuner
- Bridge position: EMG 81
- Neck position: Some Guitars EMG 81 Others EMG 60 (EMG 60 usually used for clean and to match harmony sections with James Hetfield)

== Discography ==
=== Death Angel ===
- Kill as One (demo) (producer)

=== Headbanged ===
- Metal Militia (demo)

=== Exodus ===
- 1982 Demo (1982)
- Die by His Hand (1983, demo)
- Tempo of the Damned (2004, writing credit on "Impaler")
- Blood In, Blood Out (2014, guitar solo on "Salt the Wound")

=== Metallica ===
- Kill 'Em All (1983)
- Ride the Lightning (1984)
- Master of Puppets (1986)
- ...And Justice for All (1988)
- Metallica (1991)
- Load (1996)
- ReLoad (1997)
- St. Anger (2003)
- Death Magnetic (2008)
- Hardwired... to Self-Destruct (2016)
- 72 Seasons (2023)

=== Solo ===
- Portals EP (2022)

== See also ==
- ESP Kirk Hammett

Exodus lead guitarist 1979-1983	Succeeded by Rick Hunolt

Preceded by Dave Mustaine	Metallica lead guitarist 1983–present
