= Dumble Overdrive Special =

Model of guitar amplifier

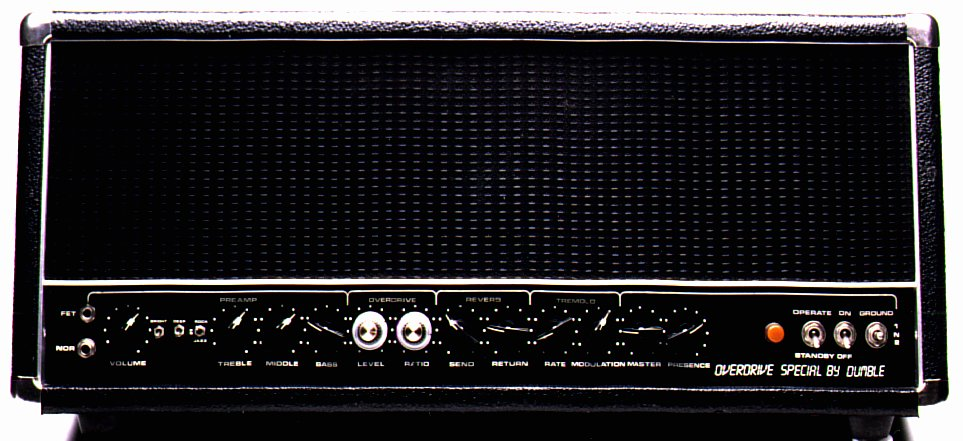
A Dumble Overdrive Special

The Overdrive Special is a guitar amplifier made by Dumble Amplifiers. Founder Howard Alexander Dumble first began producing what would become his flagship amp model in 1972, building them by hand in small numbers and incorporating bespoke changes to suit the amplifier to its buyer's preferred tone and playing style. Dumble was inspired to design the Overdrive Special after hearing Robben Ford perform with a Fender Bassman head, and as a result the amps have been described as having a "highly evolved" Fender-style tone, with a thick overdrive, long sustain, and highly sensitive dynamics. Ford, Carlos Santana, Larry Carlton, Kenny Wayne Shepherd, and John Mayer have all owned examples. Dumble's reputation and the scarcity of his amps have made the Overdrive Special among the most sought after amp models on the secondhand market, with used examples of the Overdrive Special typically selling for tens of thousands of dollars, and sometimes over $100,000.

== History ==
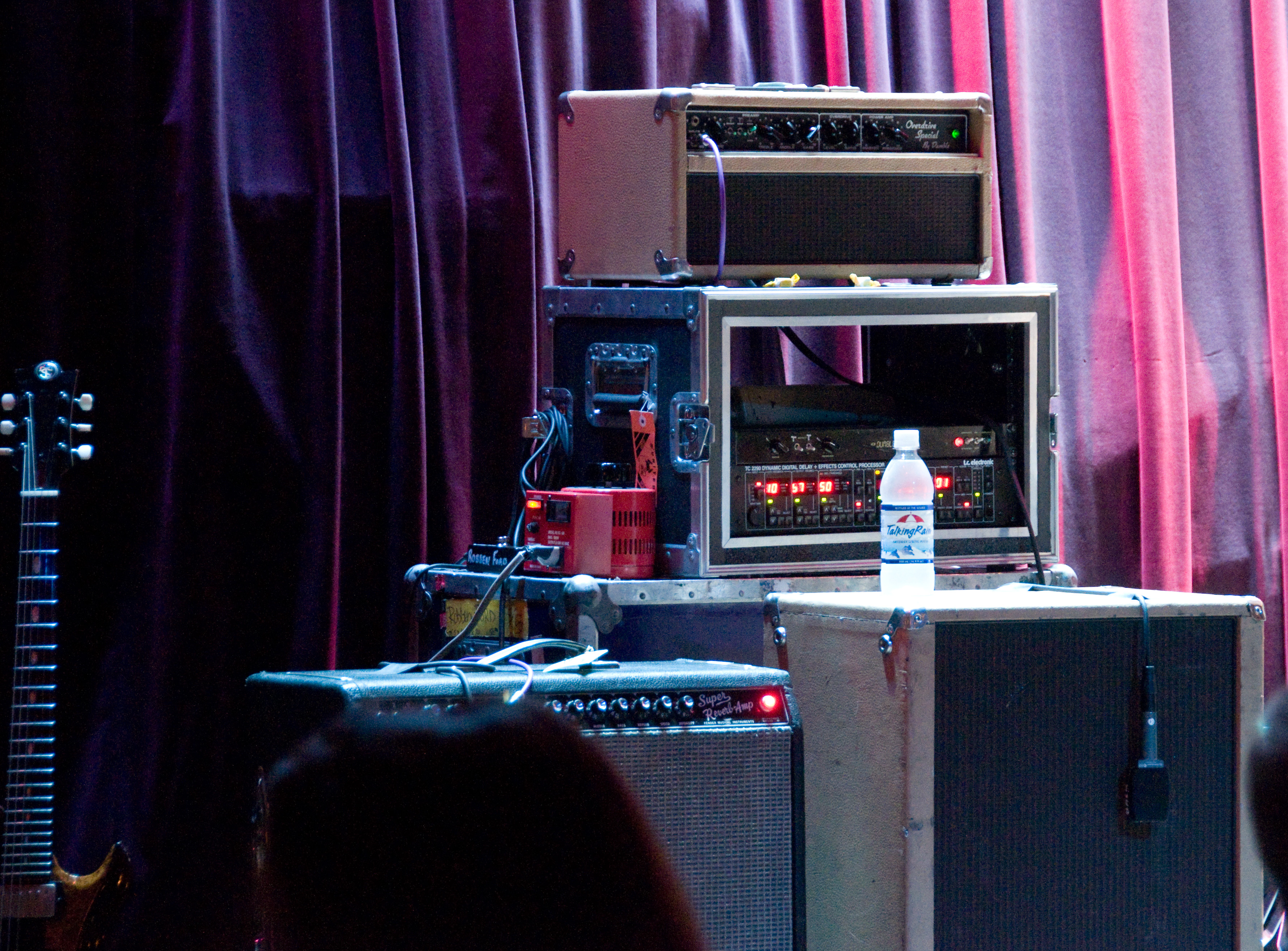
An Overdrive Special in Robben Ford's rig.

In 1969, Dumble produced his first amp model, a modified Fender-style circuit he called the Explosion, and began earning a reputation for modding and repairing amplifiers. Dumble later attended a show of Robben Ford's in which Ford played a Fender Bassman into a 2x12 speaker cabinet. Inspired by what he heard, Dumble revised the Explosion's circuit into what became the prototype Overdrive Special in 1972. At the time, Dumble was staying in Los Angeles with Jackson Browne, whose band started playing Dumble's new amps. Dumble expanded his amp designs as his profile grew, with Browne's Overdrive Specials being used by many local session musicians on hit records of the time. Ford purchased multiple amplifiers from Dumble and become the guitarist most associated with the brand's amps. To acquire an Overdrive Special, or any Dumble amp, one had to receive a recommendation from someone within Dumble's inner circle, followed by an in-person "audition", in which Dumble would listen to the player and determine how best to design their specific amp, assuming Dumble liked the player. Given his "off-the-grid" lifestyle, Dumble sometimes requested alternative payment methods: for example, when Christopher Cross bought an Overdrive Special and two other amps, Dumble's price was a Sears washer and dryer.

Dumble produced the Overdrive Special for over three decades, during which time the basic circuit of the amp evolved. Examples made in the 1970s tended to be more raw-sounding, while those made in the 1980s and 1990s took on a more refined character. Much of this was due to tone circuit changes, with Dumble removing components or adding new ones, like his "Skyliner" tone stack or "HRM" (Hot Rubber Monkey) tone stage.

Dumble disapproved of his amplifiers being sold on the secondhand market since the buyer was receiving an amplifier that had been voiced for someone else. Prices are typically in the tens of thousands of dollars, with some prices exceeding $100,000.

== Design ==
Compared to amplifiers like Dumble's Steel String Singer and its clean tones, the Overdrive Special's attraction is its overdrive. For its Overdrive channel, the Overdrive Special uses an extra preamp tube and two additional triodes of gain following the amp's standard preamp circuit, creating a cascading-gain preamp with four gain stages. Guitar Player described the amp's overdrive as a "thick, creamy, rich, yet clear and articulate lead tone that is also extremely dynamic and tactile." In its own piece, Guitar World noted the Overdrive Special has an "unforgiving character", as the amp's transparentness and touch sensitivity will expose any deficiencies in a player's technique. The piece further noted that the "overdrive of an Overdrive Special is powerful, and when you really get to crank it in a locked soundproof booth, it can be quite overwhelming." Producer Bob Rock stated the Overdrive Special was best-suited to virtuosos like Michael Landau, citing the amp's articulation.

Dumble himself advised, "The best way to approach an Overdrive is real slow. Walk up to it, look at the knobs, have it turned down real low, and then get a feeling for it. Learn what to do with your fingers to make it respond well. If you walk right up to it, it has a tendency to absolutely frighten some people."

=== Controls ===
A typical front panel feature set for an Overdrive Special includes two inputs, NOR (normal) and FET, which adds a transistor preamp stage before the preamp tubes for a brighter tone and more gain when the boost or overdrive modes are on. The clean channel's volume control follows (and stays on when the overdrive is activated), with a three-band EQ. The Overdrive Special's preamp has three mini toggle switches: Bright to add a brightness boost, Deep to change the tone section voicing from a midrange-scoop with extended bass to a mid-push and bass cut, and Rock/Jazz, with Rock having a brighter character and increased picking dynamics and Jazz being mellower with less gain. Level and Ratio knobs control the overdrive mode's output and how much overdrive is fed back into the circuit, respectively. Lastly, the Overdrive Special has Master Volume and Presence controls.

== Notable players ==
- Trey Anastasio
- Joe Bonamassa
- Jackson Browne
- Larry Carlton
- Ry Cooder
- Christopher Cross
- Robben Ford
- Ben Harper
- Jason Isbell
- Eric Johnson
- Henry Kaiser
- Steve Kimock
- Sonny Landreth
- David Lindley
- John Mayer
- Carlos Santana
- Kenny Wayne Shepherd
- Mark Tremonti
- Keith Urban

== See also ==
- Hermida Audio Zendrive, an overdrive pedal designed to replicate the sound of a Dumble Overdrive Special
