= Carr Amplifiers =

American guitar amplifier manufacturer

- Founder: Steve Carr
- Headquarters: Pittsboro, North Carolina, United States
- Products: Guitar amplifiers, guitars
- Website: www.carramps.com

Carr Amplifiers is a Pittsboro, North Carolina, manufacturer of high-end, hand-wired tube guitar amplifiers.

== Critical reception ==
Carr's amplifiers are praised for their workmanship and high-end components; Guitar Player said the Rambler's "layout and wiring are absolutely flawless." Russell Carlson in JazzTimes remarked on the Carr Rambler's "top-notch craftsmanship, hand-wired electronics and thoughtful, well-researched design."

The Carr amplifiers with 6L6 tubes are compared to classic Fender amps; the Slant 6V, which offers 6L6 or 6V6 power tube options also has 12AX7 and 12AT7 tubes, was praised as "an amazingly useful and versatile amp" and was a "Guitar Player Editors' Pick" in 2009. The "exceptional" Vincent was praised for "its rich tone, variable power, and compact size."

Many of Carr's amplifiers have switchable power outputs, adding to their versatility, according to professional reviews.

Carr Amplifiers were praised for having the "retro good looks of the Elvis era" while offering "crystal clear sound" in their selection as a runner up in Garden & Gun magazine's "Made in the South" 2010/2011 competition. Founder Steve Carr said of the company: "We try to figure out the great things about forties, fifties, and sixties amps and throw in some new twists. But our amps don’t have a whole lot of knobs or switches. They’re super-useful but very simple."

== Models ==
Carr Amplifier models include:

- Mercury V (16 watts, 2 x 6V6's, Celestion Creamback M)
- Lincoln (18/6 watts, 2 x EL84's, Celestion Creamback M) discontinued
- Impala (44 watts, 2 x 6L6's, 5751, 12AT7, 2 x 12AX7, 1x12" Eminence Elsinore)
- Sportsman (19 watts, two 6V6's, three 12AX7's, one 12AT7, 1x12" Eminence "Red-White & Blues")
- Raleigh (3.5 watts, one EL-84, two 12AX7's, 1x10" Jensen Jet)
- Viceroy (formerly the Vincent) (7/33 watts, two 6L6, one 12AT7, and three 12AX7 tubes, and a 12" Eminence speaker) discontinued
- Rambler (14/28 watts, two 6L6 tubes.)
- Slant 6V (18/22/40 watts, four 6V6 or 6L6, four 12AX7, and four 12AT7 tubes, and a 12" Eminence speaker) discontinued
- Skylark (12 watts, switchable variable attenuator 1.2 watts down to zero, two 6V6GT, two 12AX7, two 12AT7, 1x12" Celestion A Type)
- Telstar (16 watts, one 12AX7, one 12AT7, one 6SL7, one EL84, one 5881 (6L6GC type) (swappable for 6v6 or EL34), 1x12" Carr Valiant speaker)
