= Bogner Amplification =

Guitar amplifier manufacturing company

- Company type: Private
- Industry: Amplification
- Founded: 1989; 37 years ago, in Los Angeles, California, United States
- Founder: Reinhold Bogner
- Headquarters: Los Angeles, California, United States
- Key people: Reinhold Bogner
- Products: Amplifiers, speaker cabinets, effects pedals
- Website: www.bogneramplification.com

Bogner Amplification is an American guitar amplifier manufacturing company founded by Reinhold Bogner in 1989 in Los Angeles, California. Bogner began by custom-building boutique amplifiers based on classic Fenders and Marshalls, and now offers different models of serially produced amplifiers.

== History ==
Reinhold Bogner began building amps as a teenager in his native Germany. Unable to afford buying one himself, he used spare parts from his father's tube radio building hobby and began trying to recreate the sounds of his guitar idols, like Angus Young and Gary Moore. As Bogner's reputation grew, local players began bringing Bogner their amplifiers to work on at a time when many guitarists were trying to achieve the heavily-distorted tones of Eddie Van Halen's modified Marshall amps. On the advice of Kansas guitarist Rich Williams, Bogner moved to Los Angeles in 1989 with a modded Marshall as a demo and $600 in cash to advance his career as an amp builder.

Bogner was quickly hired to modify amps by Andy Brauer, who ran a business renting out "boutique" gear to a large number of local guitarists. Bogner worked on amplifiers for Billy Idol guitarist Steve Stevens and session musician Michael Landau, while producer Dave Jerden introduced Jerry Cantrell to a Bogner-modified amp for Alice in Chains' debut album Facelift. With the popularity of Cantrell's tone creating interest in his work, Bogner began building preamps, like the Triple Giant and the Fish, the latter of which was purchased by guitarists of Megadeth, Slayer, and Anthrax. However, the popularity of preamps soon waned in favor of getting complete tones from an amp, so Bogner began developing standalone amplifiers.

=== Bogner Amplification ===
The first amps Bogner made were often based on 1960s Fender Showmans, even using the original faceplate and chassis. They were hand-wired "one-off custom amps," which he sold to players such as Van Halen, Steve Stevens, and Allan Holdsworth.

Bogner spent a year developing his namesake company's first production model, the Ecstasy, which was released in 1992. The amp featured three channels with multiple voicing options to appeal to the widest range of players and genres. Initially, Bogner made two models: earlier models were designated Ecstasy 100A and 100B and later models 101A and 101B—the "A" meaning "American", with 6L6 tubes, and the "B" referencing "British", with EL34 tubes, the latter being "very close to the Fender-meets-hotrodded-Marshall template Bogner was aiming at in the first place." The Caveman amplifier was built not long after the Ecstasy and featured two channels completely hand-wired. The production run was 60 units.

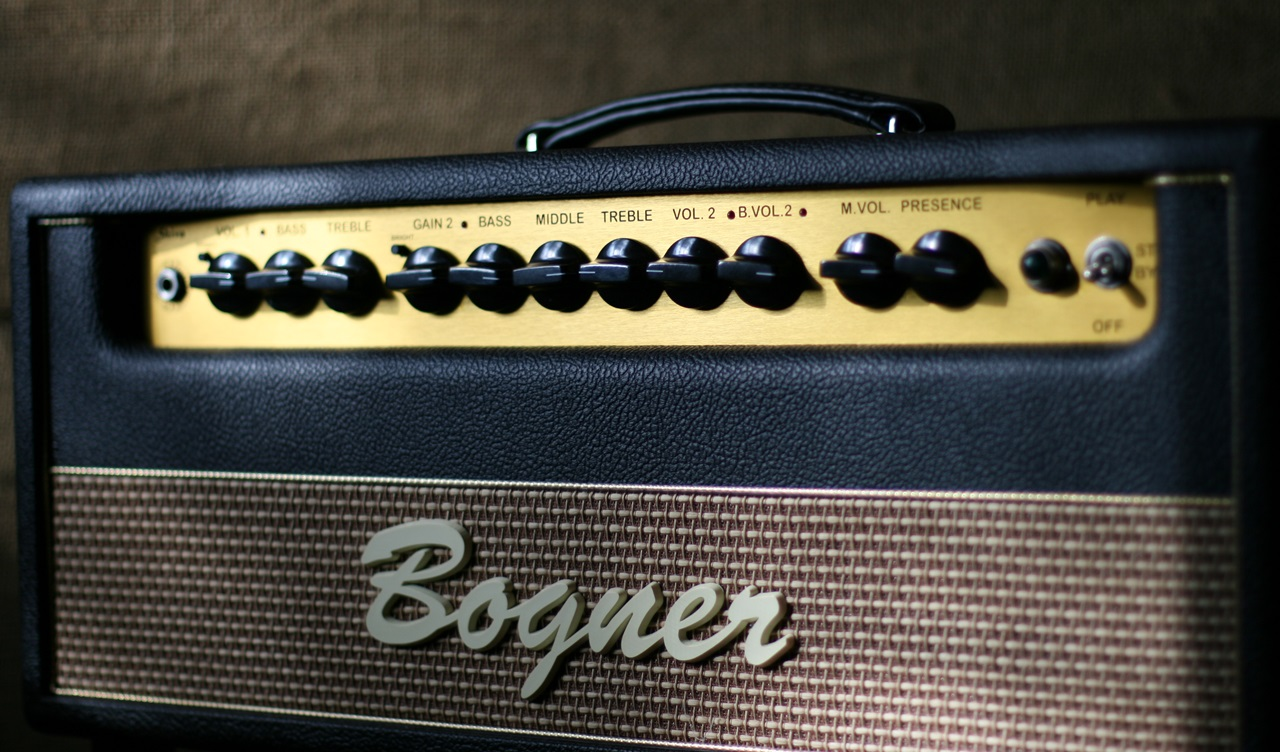
Bogner Shiva head

The company's heaviest amplifier, the Überschall (German for "supersonic"), was inspired by a local guitarist who repeatedly encouraged Bogner to produce an amp with more bass and gain. Initially Bogner resisted, as such an amp sound did not personally appeal to him as a player, but the resulting Überschall became popular among nu metal players favoring drop tunings.

As of 2023, Bogner makes three lines of amplifiers, all with switchable channels and "truly fearsome amounts of gain": the Ecstasy, Überschall, and vintage-inspired Shiva.
