= Mesa/Boogie =

American manufacturer of amplifiers

Mesa/Boogie Ltd.
- Type: Subsidiary (2021–); Private (1969–2021)
- Industry: Musical instruments
- Founded: Petaluma, California, United States (1969; 57 years ago)
- Founder: Randall Smith
- Headquarters: Petaluma, California, United States
- Key people: Randall Smith
- Products: Amplifiers
- Parent: Gibson
- Website: mesaboogie.com

Mesa/Boogie (also known as Mesa Engineering) is an American company in Petaluma, California, that manufactures amplifiers and other accessories for electric guitars and basses.

Mesa/Boogie was started in 1969 by Randall Smith as a small repair shop that modified Fender amplifiers, particularly the diminutive Fender Princeton. Smith's modifications gave the small amps much more input gain, making them much louder as well as creating a more heavily distorted guitar tone. Prominent early customers included Carlos Santana and Keith Richards and Ron Wood of the Rolling Stones. Exposure from these top players helped to establish Mesa/Boogie's position on the market, and it is frequently referred to as the first manufacturer of boutique amplifiers.

Subsequent design revisions to Smith's early amps lead to the Mark Series, which popularized modern, high-gain circuits with the Mark IIC+ model, while the 1990s saw the introduction of the flagship Rectifier amps, the success of which made Mesa/Boogie a staple of modern rock tone. In 2021, the brand was acquired by Gibson.

== Randall Smith ==
Randall Smith was born into a musical family in Berkeley, California in 1946. His mother and sister played piano and his father was the first-chair clarinet with the Oakland Symphony Orchestra, played tenor sax, had a radio show and led a hotel dance band. Smith believes all of his early musical experiences taught him how to hear tone.

As a Boy Scout, Smith became friends with his troop leader's son and they built ham radios together. Smith's father had a friend, Ernie, who built hi-fi turntables and gave him a couple to experiment on until he was 11 or 12.

Smith attended Miramonte High School in Orinda, California, and graduated in 1964. During his freshman year he attended distant University of California, Santa Barbara, as his parents wanted him removed from the counterculture influences of local University of California, Berkeley. However, he would hop freight trains nearly every weekend from Santa Barbara back to the Bay Area to see friends and return to the Beat coffee houses and bookstores of Berkeley. During the next four years he attended UC Berkeley, studying humanities, English Literature and creative writing courses, but never graduated.

Smith wanted to participate in the burgeoning San Francisco music scene, having been taught clarinet and a little sax by his father, but he took up drums, as it was the easiest to learn quickly. He played with a local blues and jam band and co-founded the band Martha's Laundry. While playing a gig, keyboardist Dave Kessner's amp failed, and after Smith successfully repaired it, an impressed Kessner proposed opening a music store together with Smith as the repairman. They opened Prune Music in 1967, inside a building that had been a Chinese grocery store. Smith's clientele included area bands like the Steve Miller Band, the Grateful Dead, and Jefferson Airplane.

Offshoots of Prune Music continue in Berkeley to this day with Subway Guitars, Sam Cohen (aka Fat Dog) and Guitar Resurrection in Austin, TX with former Martha's Laundry guitarist, Jim Lehman (aka Lizard Slim). They were partners until 1975.

== History of Mesa/Boogie ==
=== Princeton Boogie ===
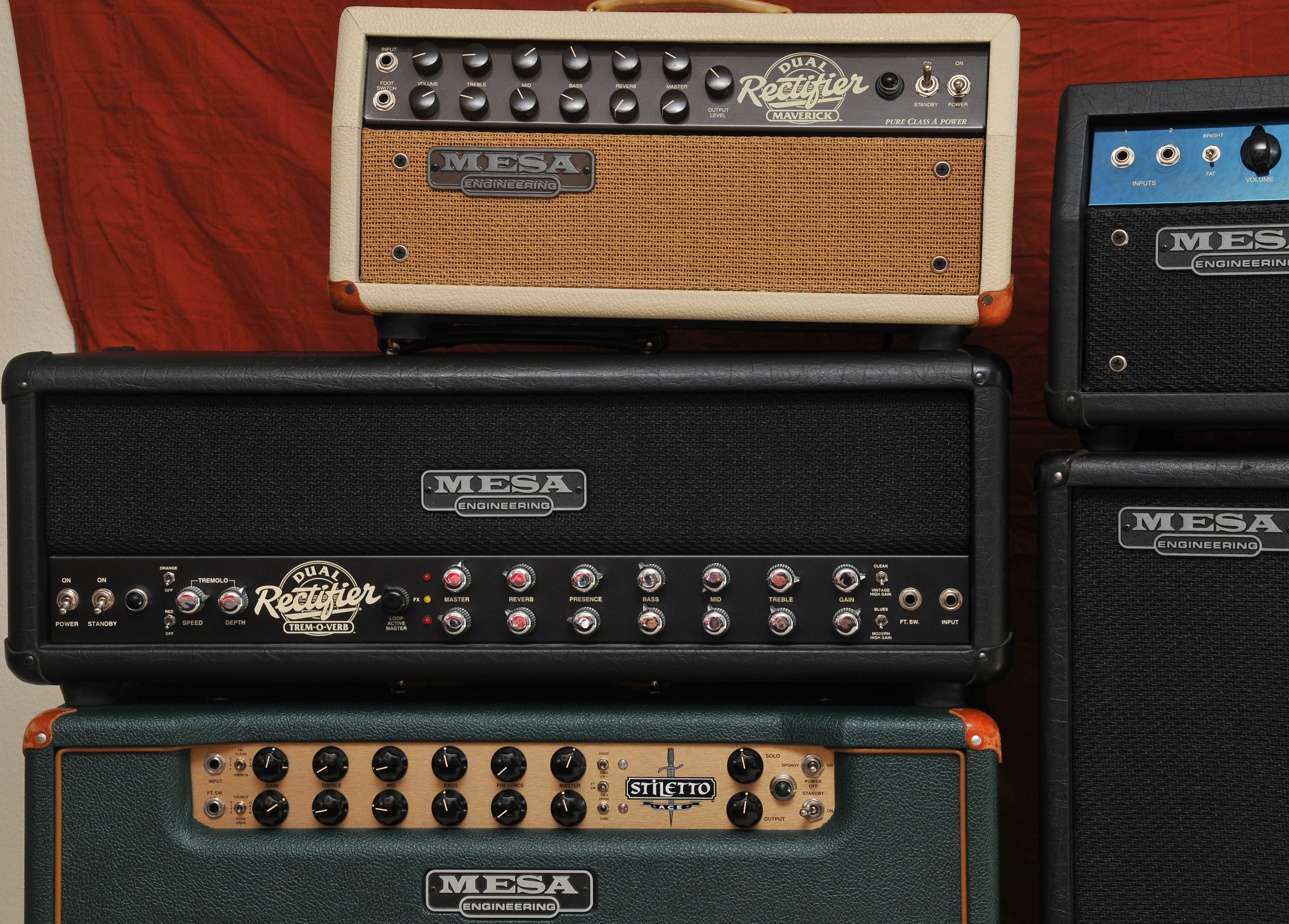
Several Mesa/Boogie amps.

Mesa/Boogie began with a practical joke when Smith was commissioned to secretly convert the 20-watt Fender Princeton of local guitarist Barry Melton of Country Joe & the Fish into a significantly louder 100-watt amp without altering its appearance. He accomplished this by replacing the amplifier section with that of a Fender Bassman and replacing the 10-inch speaker with a 12-inch speaker. To ensure the joke would work, Smith asked Carlos Santana, a customer at Prune Music, to demo the amp. Despite initial skepticism at the sight of the seemingly stock amplifier, Santana played it and exclaimed, "Man, that amp really boogies!" Customers at Prune Music were impressed with what Smith dubbed the "Princeton Boogie" and Smith would ultimately build and sell over 200 of them before the local supply of used Princetons ran out.

At the time, Smith supplemented his amplifier income by building concrete foundations for houses and restoring Mercedes-Benz automobile engines. Smith wanted to purchase amp and engine parts at wholesale prices from European dealers, so he founded Mesa Engineering as an umbrella company with a more serious-sounding name than Boogie. Smith had intended to use the name "Marin Engineering," but it was taken and "Mesa" was chosen off the top of his head.

=== The 1970s and the first Marks ===
In the early 1970s, Smith pioneered what became known as "cascading" gain stages: he was building a custom preamp for Lee Michaels and decided to add an extra tube gain stage along with three variable gain controls at different points in the circuit. The amount of distortion this produced surprised both men, and Smith subsequently combined this innovation with what he had learned modding Fender Princeton combos to create the industry's first high-gain amplifier, dubbed simply the "Boogie." Released in 1972, these Boogies proved a great success during Fender's "CBS-era", during which time Fender's tube amps suffered a perceived decline in quality while multiple lines of new transistor-based amps were poorly received. Carlos Santana, George Harrison, Robben Ford, Eric Clapton, and Crosby, Stills, Nash & Young all used early Boogies. The Rolling Stones ordered seven Boogies for their March 1977 El Mocambo 1977 club shows, and continued to use them and subsequent iterations as their main amps up until 1994.

As demand for his amps grew, Smith decided to move his workshop out of the Prune Music storefront to get away from the distractions of the store having become a busy local hangout. He relocated to what was formerly a plywood dog kennel, then, eventually, to his home.

Smith produced a number of custom variations of the Boogie through the late 1970s, with options including reverb, a five-band graphic EQ, various speakers (most often Altec or Electro-Voice), koa wood jointed cabinets, and wicker grills. Upon the 1978 release of the Boogie's successor—the "Mark II"—the Boogie was renamed the Mark I. Smith ultimately produced over 3,000 amps out of his home workshop in the 1970s.

=== The 1980s and the Mark IIC+ ===
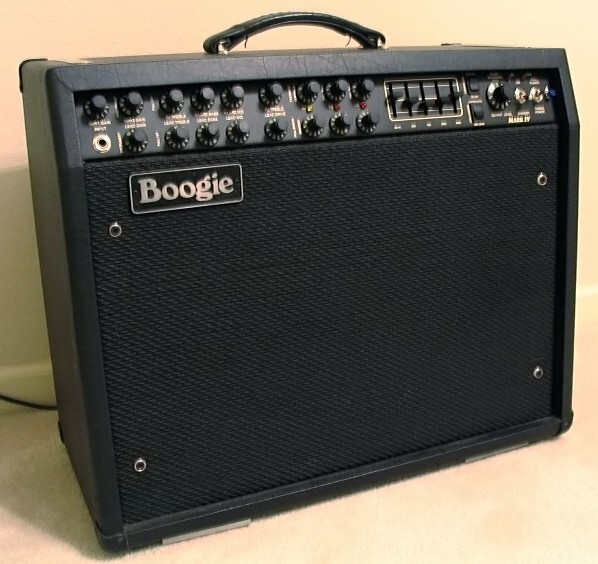
Mesa Boogie Mark IV

As Mesa/Boogie continued to grow, Smith moved the company to Petaluma in 1980 and continued to improve his amp designs to meet players' requests. Revisions to the Mark II resulted in amplifier milestones such as channel switching (Mark IIA) and the first effects loop (Mark IIB). The IIC was introduced in 1983 to fix a noticeable "pop" when switching channels, while subsequent improvements to the effects loop resulted in a handwritten "+" designation on the rear of each amplifier's chassis. Notably, this new IIC+ variant also featured an altered preamp to create a more aggressive sound, with a strong midrange focus and tight low end. Combined with its graphic EQ, the amp excelled at "soaring lead sounds and huge crunch chords." Early adopters included heavy metal guitarists like Metallica's Kirk Hammett and James Hetfield. The amp was also a favorite of top session musicians at the time like Steve Lukather. As the Mark III was already deep in development, fewer than 3,000 IIC+ amps were made during its short production run between January 1984 and March 1985. With the Mark III, Mesa/Boogie added a second rhythm mode—or "crunch" sound—while the Mark IV expanded the amp's format to three fully independent channels with more controls and options than any other amp of the time.

Throughout the decade, Mesa/Boogie continued to expanded its product lineup, with power amplifiers like the M180/190 and Strategy series and preamps such as the Quad and Studio. Other amp models developed in the 1980s include the Son of Boogie and the Studio .22.

=== The 1990s and the Rectifiers ===
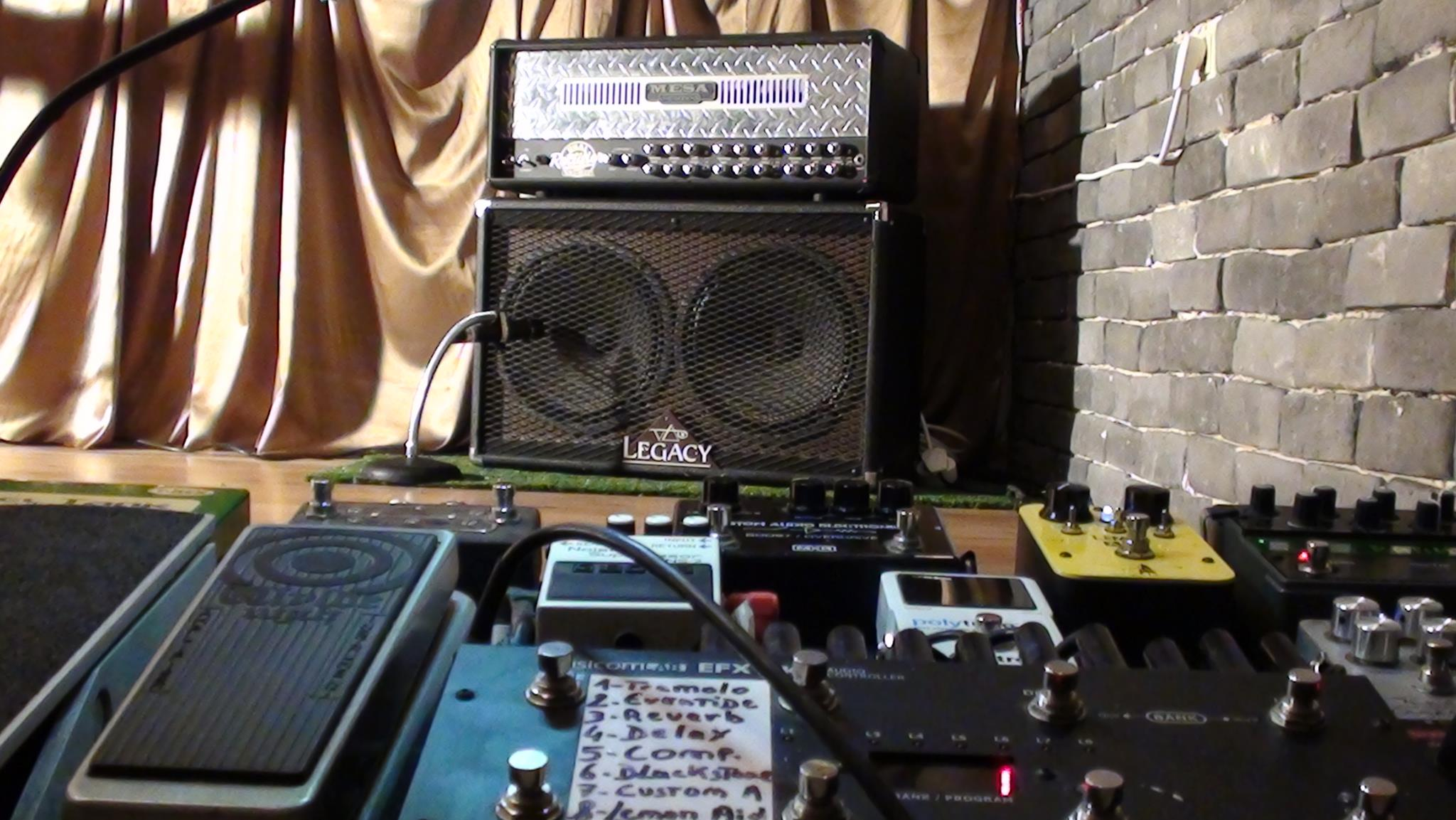
A Dual Rectifier head.

As the 1980s came to a close, the complicated features and boutique styling of the Mark series began losing popularity in favor of simpler designs by Marshall, Bogner, and Soldano. Particularly inspired by the Soldano SLO-100—itself derived from the Mark series circuits—Mesa introduced the Dual Rectifier in 1991. With a "raw, aggressive bass-heavy sound" and sporting a characteristic steel, diamond faceplate, the Rectifier was Mesa's take on a "big, monster-metal head" and intended to look threatening compared to the Mark amps.

The Rectifier became immensely popular among heavier styles of rock music in the wake of grunge, most notably nu metal, as well as hard rock, post-grunge, and punk. While an array of bands have used Rectifiers—including Korn, Tool, Soundgarden, Foo Fighters, and Blink 182—Smith has said the overwhelming success of the amp with its distinctive sound and styling has led many people to associate the entire Mesa brand exclusively with metal, despite the company's roots in the "Fender legacy" and its initial reputation as a "hippie outfit" aimed at blues players.

Mesa/Boogie continued to revise the design of the Rectifiers as the decade went on, with "Revisions" F and G having a darker, looser sound that extended the model's popularity into the 2000s.

Mesa/Boogie followed up the success of the Rectifiers with the short-lived Maverick and Blue Angel models, as well as the Nomads.

=== The 2000s to present day ===
Mesa/Boogie has continued to introduce new models in the 2000s and 2010s, with models such as the Road King II, the Lone Star and Lone Star Special, the Stiletto and Express lines along with lower watt versions of its large amps, such as the mini Rectifier, and the Mark V:25 and Mark V:35.

Mesa Engineering offers the Subway series, a lightweight, high-powered Class D amplifier and ultra-lite bass cabinet line.

On January 6, 2021, it was announced that Gibson had acquired Mesa/Boogie, with then-75-year-old Smith joining Gibson as "Master Designer and Pioneer of Mesa/Boogie and beyond." In this capacity, Smith oversaw the development and release of the Mark VII amplifiers. In mid-2024, Gibson announced that Smith was no longer with the company, having "completed his time" in his prior role.
