= Jonathon Newby =

American singer

- Born: Jonathon Christopher Newby
- Genres: Progressive rock, Experimental rock, Garage rock, Psychedelic rock, Ambient, Dream pop, Soundtracks
- Occupations: Musician, Songwriter, Singer, Designer
- Instruments: Vocals, Drums, Piano, Bass
- Years active: 2000–present
- Labels: Young Tobacco, Previously: Immortal, Fearless Records,
- Website: http://www.youngtobacco.com

Jonathon Newby was the lead singer of the post-hardcore/progressive rock band Brazil from its inception in 2000 until August 2007. Newby and his brother Nic Newby were two of the founding members. On earlier Brazil recordings, Newby played drums but eventually became the lead singer. Newby left the band in 2007, resulting in its break-up.

== Lyrical influence ==
Newby takes inspiration from sources, such as literature, pop culture, and film

== Writing (non-musical) ==
Newby maintained a blog titled 500 Days of Night chronicling every concert Brazil performed from 2000 to 2008.

== Discography ==
=== Brazil ===
| Album | Label | Release date | Format |
|---|---|---|---|
| Brazil (Demo) | Sel-released | 2000 | CD |
| Dasein | Fearless Records | September 17, 2002 | CD |
| The Lost EP | | Never | |
| A Hostage and the Meaning of Life | Fearless Records | April 20, 2004 | CD |
| The Philosophy of Velocity | Immortal Records | October 3, 2006 | CD |

=== As JC Autobody ===
| Album | Label | Release date | Format |
|---|---|---|---|
| Trash (EP) | Young Tobacco | 17-Mar-2015 | Digital |
| Lifetaker (EP) | Young Tobacco | 17-Mar-2015 | Digital |
| Indiana (EP) | Young Tobacco | 17-Mar-2015 | Digital |
| Young Tobacco (LP) | Young Tobacco | 17-Mar-2015 | Digital |
| Witches (LP) | Young Tobacco | 17-Mar-2015 | Digital |
| War Paint (LP) | Young Tobacco | 2017 (TBD; in production) | TBD; unreleased |

=== As City Water ===
| Album | Label | Release date | Format |
|---|---|---|---|
| 1 (EP) | Young Tobacco | 17-Mar-2015 | Digital |
| 2 (EP) | Young Tobacco | 11-Sep-2015 | Digital |
| 3 (EP) | Young Tobacco | TBD; unreleased | TBD; unreleased |

=== As JXMAS ===
| Album | Label | Release date | Format |
|---|---|---|---|
| Dirigibles (LP) | Young Tobacco | TBD | TBD; unreleased |

=== As Poorly Built Men ===
| Album | Label | Release date | Format |
|---|---|---|---|
| Husherville (LP) | Young Tobacco | TBD; unreleased | TBD; unreleased |
