= Gavin Lurssen =

American mastering engineer

- Origin: Hollywood, Los Angeles, California, U.S.
- Occupation: Mastering engineer
- Years active: 1982–present
- Education: Berklee College of Music
- Website: lurssenmastering.com

Gavin Lurssen is an American mastering engineer. He owns Lurssen Mastering in Hollywood, California. Lurssen's Grammy Award–winning work includes Raising Sand, a collaborative album featuring Alison Krauss and Robert Plant, and the soundtrack for the Coen brothers film O Brother, Where Art Thou?. He has also mastered recordings by Tom Waits, Sheryl Crow, Loretta Lynn, Matchbox Twenty, T Bone Burnett, Jennette McCurdy, and many others. Lurssen is an alumnus of the Berklee College of Music.

== Discography ==
This is a partial discography of recordings mastered by Gavin Lurssen.

=== Albums ===
Year	Title	Artist	Notes
1982	Chicago 16	Chicago	
1993	Live	James Taylor	
1993	I'm Alive	Jackson Browne	
1993	Stepping Out	Diana Krall	
1994	I Love Everybody	Lyle Lovett	
1994	Jamie Walters	Jamie Walters	
1995	Leo Kottke Live	Leo Kottke	
1995	Only Trust Your Heart	Diana Krall	
1995	Feels Like Home	Linda Ronstadt	
1995	Evil Stig	Evil Stig	
1996	Looking East	Jackson Browne	
1996	Peace on Earth	Kitarō	
1996	Sell, Sell, Sell	David Gray	
1996	That's Right	George Benson	
1996	Rockin' down the Highway: The Wildlife Concert	The Doobie Brothers	
1996	This Conversation Seems Like a Dream	Kip Winger	
1996	Acoustic Traveller	John McEuen	
1996	En Pleno Vuelo	Marco Antonio Solís	
1997	Vulnerable	Marvin Gaye	
1997	More Best of Leonard Cohen	Leonard Cohen	
1997	When the Bough Breaks	Bill Ward	
1997	Last of the Sharpshooters	Down by Law	
1997	Plastique Valentine	The Humpers	
1998	Live at the Roxy	Social Distortion	
1998	Transcendental Highway	Colin Hay	
1998	Walking in Avalon	Christopher Cross	
1998	The Living End	The Living End	
1998	Happy Pills	Candlebox	
1998	No Substance	Bad Religion	
1998	Guilty 'til Proved Innocent!	The Specials	
1998	Waste of Mind	Zebrahead	
1999	The Fundamental Elements of Southtown	P.O.D.	
1999	Synergy	Dave Weckl	
1999	Fire in the City of Automatons	No Knife	
1999	Edge of Forever	Lynyrd Skynyrd	
1999	Libido	Buck-O-Nine	
1999	Brave New World	Styx	
1999	Meson Ray	The Ernies	
1999	Live at The Woodlands	Crystal Lewis	
2000	The New America	Bad Religion	
2000	U.S. Crush	U.S. Crush	
2000	Christmas Time Again	Lynyrd Skynyrd	
2000	Fearless	Crystal Lewis	
2000	Holiday! A Collection of Christmas Classics	Crystal Lewis	
2000	Playmate of the Year	Zebrahead	
2001	Just Like Gravity	CPR	
2001	Beautiful Midnight	Matthew Good Band	
2001	Fan Dance	Sam Phillips	
2001	Humanistic	Abandoned Pools	
2002	Blood Money	Tom Waits	
2002	Beeline	Peter Case	
2002	Light a Match, For I Deserve to Burn	The Beautiful Mistake	
2002	Santa Claus Lane	Hilary Duff	
2002	Andalucia	Tito & Tarantula	
2003	Diamonds On the Inside	Ben Harper	
2004	Real Gone	Tom Waits	
2006	Peeping Tom	Peeping Tom	
2007	Exile on Mainstream	Matchbox Twenty	
2007	Raising Sand	Allison Krause/Robert Plant	Grammy Award (Album of the Year, Record of the Year)
2008	Approaching Normal	Blue October	
2009	Songs for a Breakup, Vol. 1	Fitz and the Tantrums	
2010	The Union	Elton John/Leon Russell	
2013	Dimensionaut	Sound of Contact	
2013	...Like Clockwork	Queens of the Stone Age	
2014	Oko	Lena Fayre	
2014	Sonic Highways	Foo Fighters	
2015	B	Diamante Eléctrico	Latin Grammy Award (Best Rock Album)
2015	Breathless	Terence Blanchard	
2016	A Sailor's Guide to Earth	Sturgill Simpson	Grammy Award (Best Country Album)
2018	Live	Terence Blanchard	
2023	In Times New Roman...	Queens of the Stone Age	

=== Soundtracks ===
Year	Title	Artist	Notes
2024	Dune: Part Two	Hans Zimmer	
2016	Money Monster	Henry Jackman/Dominic Lewis	
2016	Kung Fu Panda 3	Hans Zimmer	
2015	Creed (soundtrack)	Ludwig Göransson	
2015	Kingsman: The Secret Service (soundtrack)	Henry Jackman/Matthew Margeson	
2013	Inside Llewyn Davis (soundtrack)	Various Artists	
2013	Pacific Rim (soundtrack)	Ramin Djawadi	
2012	The Hunger Games: Songs from District 12 and Beyond	Various Artists	
2011	Cars 2	Michael Giacchino	
2008	Slumdog Millionaire (soundtrack)	A. R. Rahman	Academy Award (Best Song and Best Soundtrack)
2008	A Perfect Place	Mike Patton	
2007	Good Luck Chuck	Various Artists	
2007	Halloween	Various Artists	
2006	Cars (soundtrack)	Various Artists	
2005	Transamerica (soundtrack)	Various Artists	Academy Award (Best Song)
2005	Bratz: Rock Angelz (soundtrack)	Various Artists	
2004	The Ladykillers	Various Artists	
2003	Cold Mountain (soundtrack)	Various Artists	Academy Award Nominee (Best Original Score)
2003	A Mighty Wind	Various Artists	Academy Award Nominee (Best Song)
2002	The Santa Clause 2	Various Artists	
2002	Lizzie McGuire (soundtrack)	Various Artists	
2000	O Brother, Where Art Thou? (soundtrack)	Various Artists	
2000	Coyote Ugly	Various Artists	
1996	James and the Giant Peach	Randy Newman	
1994	Backbeat	Don Was	

=== Reissues ===
Year	Title	Artist	Notes
1993	Bridge over Troubled Water	Simon & Garfunkel	MasterSound Edition
1994	What's Going On	Marvin Gaye	Motown Master Series
1994	Friday Night in San Francisco	Al Di Meola, John McLaughlin, Paco de Lucía	MasterSound Edition
1994	Couldn't Stand the Weather	Stevie Ray Vaughan and Double Trouble	MasterSound Edition
1994	Wish You Were Here	Pink Floyd	MasterSound Edition
1994	In Our Lifetime	Marvin Gaye	Motown Master Series
1994	Blow by Blow	Jeff Beck	MasterSound Edition
1994	Stevie Wonder Presents: Syreeta	Syreeta Wright	
1995	Farmer's Market Barbecue	The Count Basie Big Band	
1995	Basie Jam	Count Basie	
1995	Pickin' the Blues	Doc Watson and Merle Watson	
1995	Silk Degrees	Boz Scaggs	MasterSound Edition
1998	I Want You	Marvin Gaye	
1998	Trouble Man	Marvin Gaye	
1998	Let's Get It On	Marvin Gaye	
2003	Paid in Full	Eric B. & Rakim	Deluxe Edition
2005	Follow the Leader	Eric B. & Rakim	Expanded Edition
2005	Endtroducing.....	DJ Shadow	Deluxe Edition
2005	Hellbilly Deluxe	Rob Zombie	Deluxe Edition
2008	Whoa, Nelly!	Nelly Furtado	Special Edition
2009	Let Love Rule	Lenny Kravitz	20th Anniversary Deluxe Edition
2014	The Apple Years 1968–75	George Harrison	With Paul Hicks & Reuben Cohen
2018	All In 1978-2018	Toto	With Elliot Scheiner & Reuben Cohen
2026	Eternal Melody	Yoshiki	Digital Remaster

=== As assistant ===
Year	Title	Artist
1993	Crimson and Blue	Phil Keaggy
1995	Temptation	Holly Cole
1995	I Just Wasn't Made for These Times	Brian Wilson
1995	Go to the Top	Hitomi
1996	The Road to Ensenada	Lyle Lovett

== Awards ==
=== Grammy Awards ===
- 2002: Album of the Year – O Brother, Where Art Thou? (soundtrack)
- 2004: Best Historical Album – Martin Scorsese Presents the Blues: A Musical Journey
- 2009: Album of the Year – Raising Sand (Robert Plant & Alison Krauss)

=== Latin Grammy Awards ===
- 2010: Best Engineered Album: Distinto (Diego Torres)
- 2015: Best Rock Album: B (Diamante Eléctrico)
