= Phoenix (The Classic Crime album) =

Studio album by the Classic Crime
- Released: August 14, 2012
- Genres: Alternative rock, indie rock, emo pop
- Length: 52:17
- Label: Independent
- Producer: Matt MacDonald

The Classic Crime chronology
Vagabonds (2010)	Phoenix (2012)	What Was Done, Vol. 1: A Decade Revisited (2014)

Professional ratings
Review scores
Source	Rating
Alternative Press	link
Indie Vision Music	link
Sputnikmusic	link
Jesus Freak Hideout	link
Lexington Music Press	link

Phoenix is the fourth album from rock band the Classic Crime. The album was released on August 14, 2012. Phoenix was funded through the website Kickstarter and is the first album released independently by the Classic Crime. Kickstarter backers were able to digitally download the album two weeks prior to its release date. At the completion of its funding, Phoenix was the ninth most funded musical project on Kickstarter.

== Background and funding ==
A Kickstarter project entitled "The Classic Crime's New Album" was created on March 8, 2012 with a funding goal of $30,000 and was met within the first twenty-four hours of the project being posted. By April 12, 2012, the end of the funding period, the project had received $86,278 in pledges from 1,981 backers.

The band announced the title of the album on June 12, 2012 through its Facebook and Twitter page. Lead singer Matt MacDonald described the title, Phoenix, as cliche but symbolic, stating that hope for the future of the band is "back, it's different, you know? It's better than it was but it's back". MacDonald compared the styling of the songs to previous albums saying, "For those of you who prefer Albatross, there are 3 songs you will gravitate to. For those of you who like The Silver Cord, there are probably 5 songs you will gravitate to. For those of you who like when we stretch the boundaries a bit, there are another 4 tracks you'll probably be ecstatic about.".

== Track listing ==
Album release
No.	Title	Writer(s)	Length
1.	"One Man Army" (Intro)	Matt MacDonald, Paul Eriksen, Robbie Negrin	2:57
2.	"You and Me Both"	MacDonald, Eriksen, Negrin	3:56
3.	"Young Again"	MacDonald, Daniel Koch	3:55
4.	"Beautiful Darkside"	MacDonald	4:37
5.	"Heaven and Hell"	MacDonald, Koch	5:04
6.	"The Precipice"	MacDonald	3:38
7.	"Let Me Die"	MacDonald	3:53
8.	"Glass Houses"	MacDonald, Eriksen, Negrin	4:21
9.	"Dead Rose"	MacDonald, Eriksen, Negrin	4:03
10.	"Painted Dreams"	MacDonald, Eriksen, Negrin	4:05
11.	"What I'd Give Up"	MacDonald	3:48
12.	"City of Orphans"	MacDonald	5:01
13.	"I Will Wait" (Outro)	MacDonald, Eriksen, Negrin	2:59
Total length:			52:17

== Credits ==
- Producer - Matt MacDonald
- Engineer - Brandon Metcalf
- Drum editing and sampling - Jef Moll
- Vocal editing - Matt MacDonald
- Programming - Matt MacDonald
- Mixer - Michael “Elvis” Baskette
- Mix Engineer - Jef Moll
- Mix Assister - Kevin Thomas
- Mixed at Studio Barbarosa South (Altamonte Springs, FL)
- Recorded at Destiny Studios (Monroe, WA)
- Mastered by Ted Jensen at Sterling Sound (New York, NY)
- Art Direction and Design - Brad Filip
- Band Photography - Robbie Negrin assisted by Alan Clark

and Jeff Blackburn

== Personnel ==
- Matt MacDonald – vocals, guitars
- Robbie Negrin – guitar, group vocals
- Alan Clark – bass, group vocals
- Paul "Skip" Erickson – drums, group vocals
