= A Santa Cause: It's a Punk Rock Christmas =

2003 compilation album by various artists

Compilation album by Various Artists
- Released: Vol. 1: November 11, 2003; Vol. 2: December 5, 2006; Vol. 1 & 2: December 4, 2007
- Genres: Pop punk, indie rock, post-hardcore, emo, Christmas music
- Length: 1:08:02
- Label: Immortal

Professional ratings
Review scores
| Source | Rating |
|---|---|
| Allmusic | 3/5 stars |

A Santa Cause: It's a Punk Rock Christmas was released November 11, 2003 on the label Immortal Records. A percentage of the proceeds from the album's sale were donated to The Elizabeth Glaser Pediatric AIDS Foundation. A second edition, donating money to Cure Autism Now, was released in 2006.

== Volume 1: track listing ==
The track listing on the back cover of Volume 1 is notable for several errors in the titles of songs and even the names of the bands. For example, "Christmas Night of the Living Dead" by MxPx is listed as "Christmas Night of Zombies", and Acceptance's cover of "Happy Xmas (War Is Over)" is listed as "So This Is Christmas".

| # | Title | Artist | Original Artist(s) | Length |
|---|---|---|---|---|
| 1. | "Christmas in Hollis" | The A.K.A.'s | Run-DMC | 3:40 |
| 2. | "Forget December" | Something Corporate | | 3:13 |
| 3. | "December Is for Cynics" | The Matches | | 3:31 |
| 4. | "I Won't Be Home for Christmas" | Blink-182 | | 3:16 |
| 5. | "Feed The World (Do They Know It's Christmas)" | Far featuring Chino Moreno | Band Aid | 3:46 |
| 6. | "Yule Shoot Your Eye Out" | Fall Out Boy | | 3:41 |
| 7. | "Christmas Night of the Living Dead" | MxPx | | 2:24 |
| 8. | "X12 Days of XXXMASX" | From First To Last | | 3:34 |
| 9. | "I'll Be Home for Christmas" | Matchbook Romance | Bing Crosby | 2:23 |
| 10. | "Ex-Miss" | New Found Glory | | 3:36 |
| 11. | "Happy Xmas (War Is Over)" | Acceptance | John Lennon and Yoko Ono | 4:06 |
| 12. | "Christmas Time Is Here" | Gatsby's American Dream | Vince Guaraldi Trio | 2:21 |
| 13. | "Sleigh Bells and Wine" | Jason Gleason (formerly of Further Seems Forever) | | 3:17 |
| 14. | "The Most Wonderful Time of the Year" | InMemory | Andy Williams | 2:22 |
| 15. | "This Time of Year" | The Mighty Mighty Bosstones | | 2:22 |
| 16. | "I Saw Daddy Kissing Santa Claus" | Standstill | | 2:57 |
| 17. | "A Cradle in Bethelham" | The Beautiful Mistake | | 3:50 |
| 18. | "Icicles" | Punchline | | 3:24 |
| 19. | "Mookie's Last Christmas" | Saosin | | 2:46 |
| 20. | "It Came Upon a Midnight Clear" | The Red West | Edmund Sears | 5:19 |
| 21. | "Santa's Got a Mullet" (Hidden Track) | Nerf Herder | | 2:15 |

== Volume 2: track listing ==
| # | Title | Artist | Original Artist(s) | Length |
|---|---|---|---|---|
| 1. | "All I Want for Christmas" | Dave Melillo | Mariah Carey | 3:51 |
| 2. | "New Year" | Tyler Read | | 2:53 |
| 3. | "Holly Jolly Christmas" | The Format | Burl Ives | 2:49 |
| 4. | "Feliz Navidad" | It Dies Today | José Feliciano | 3:04 |
| 5. | "It's Cold Out There" | Spitalfield | | 3:57 |
| 6. | "Joey Had a Smoke" | Meg & Dia | | 3:20 |
| 7. | "Stay" | A Down To Earth Approach | | 3:06 |
| 8. | "Have Yourself a Merry Little Christmas" | Daphne Loves Derby | Judy Garland | 2:28 |
| 9. | "Happy Xmas (War Is Over)" | Hot Rod Circuit | John Lennon and Yoko Ono | 3:27 |
| 10. | "A Wonderful Christmas Time" | June | Paul McCartney | 3:51 |
| 11. | "Christmas On the Coast" | A Change Of Pace | | 2:26 |
| 12. | "Last Christmas" | The Finals | Wham! | 4:09 |
| 13. | "I'll Be Home for Christmas" | Far-Less | Bing Crosby | 3:22 |
| 14. | "Gary the Green Nosed Reindeer" | MC Lars | | 3:51 |
| 15. | "O' Holy Night" | Umbrellas | Adolphe Adams | 3:59 |
| 16. | "O Come Emmanuel" | Haste The Day | | 4:05 |
| 17. | "Not Giving In" | Rediscover | | 3:07 |
| 18. | "Christmas in Ohio" | Brandtson | | 3:42 |
| 19. | "Father Christmas" | Action Item | The Kinks | 3:07 |
| 20. | "Cities Made of Snow" | Brazil | | 1:46 |
| 21. | "Blue Christmas" | Flee The Seen | Elvis Presley | 3:54 |
| 22. | "Tell Me Is It Christmas" | Gone By Daylight | | 3:48 |
| 23. | "What a Wonderful World" | Scary Kids Scaring Kids | Louis Armstrong | 2:31 |

== A SANTA CAUSES-It's a Pop Rock Christmas ==
Japan also got a separate release titled A SANTA CAUSES-It's a Pop Rock Christmas. This album was only released in Japan or through Japanese online music stores. It was released in Japan on November 14, 2012 through Twilight Records. It is a single CD containing 20 tracks by various Japanese and American rock bands performing various Christmas songs. Unlike the other Santa Cause albums that contained both original songs and covers, this album contains all cover songs redone by other bands and artists.

=== Track listing ===
| # | Title | Artist | Original Artist(s) | Length |
|---|---|---|---|---|
| 1. | "All I Want for Christmas is You" | Quietdrive | Mariah Carey | 3:52 |
| 2. | "Last Christmas" | N E W B R E E D | Wham! | 3:37 |
| 3. | "I Saw Mommy Kissing Santa Claus" | Cash Cash | Jimmy Boyd | 3:49 |
| 4. | "Christmas Eve (English Version)" | LOST | Tatsurō Yamashita | 3:30 |
| 5. | "Rudolph the Red-Nosed Reindeer" | Alex Goot | Gene Autry | 2:16 |
| 6. | "Santa Claus Is Coming to Town" | FIVE NEW OLD | Eddie Cantor | 3:41 |
| 7. | "Happy Xmas (War Is Over)" | Cartel | John Lennon and Yoko Ono | 3:26 |
| 8. | "Winter Song" | SWANKY DANK | Dreams Come True | 3:53 |
| 9. | "Shake Up Christmas" | Larzz | Train | 3:52 |
| 10. | "Wonderful Christmastime" | Holiday Parade | Paul McCartney | 2:30 |
| 11. | "Christmas (Baby Please Come Home)" | Runner Runner | Darlene Love | 2:55 |
| 12. | "Frosty the Snowman" | sfpr | Gene Autry and the Cass County Boys | 3:39 |
| 13. | "Christmas in Hollis" | Saprize | Run-DMC | 3:11 |
| 14. | "Merry Christmas, Happy Holidays" | Stereo Skyline | 'N Sync | 2:53 |
| 15. | "Here Comes Santa Claus" | MY LAST DECEMBER | Gene Autry | 2:11 |
| 16. | "Christmas Time Is Here" | Hawthorne Heights | Vince Guaraldi Trio | 2:43 |
| 17. | "We Wish You A Merry Christmas" | FAT PROP | John Denver | 2:47 |
| 18. | "Winter Wonderland" | The Hype Theory | Richard Himber | 2:23 |
| 19. | "I Heard the Bells on Christmas Day" | DRIVE FAR | Johnny Marks | 4:29 |
| 20. | "Silent Night" | BONAVENTURE | Franz Xaver Gruber | 2:41 |
