= The Classic Crime =

American rock band

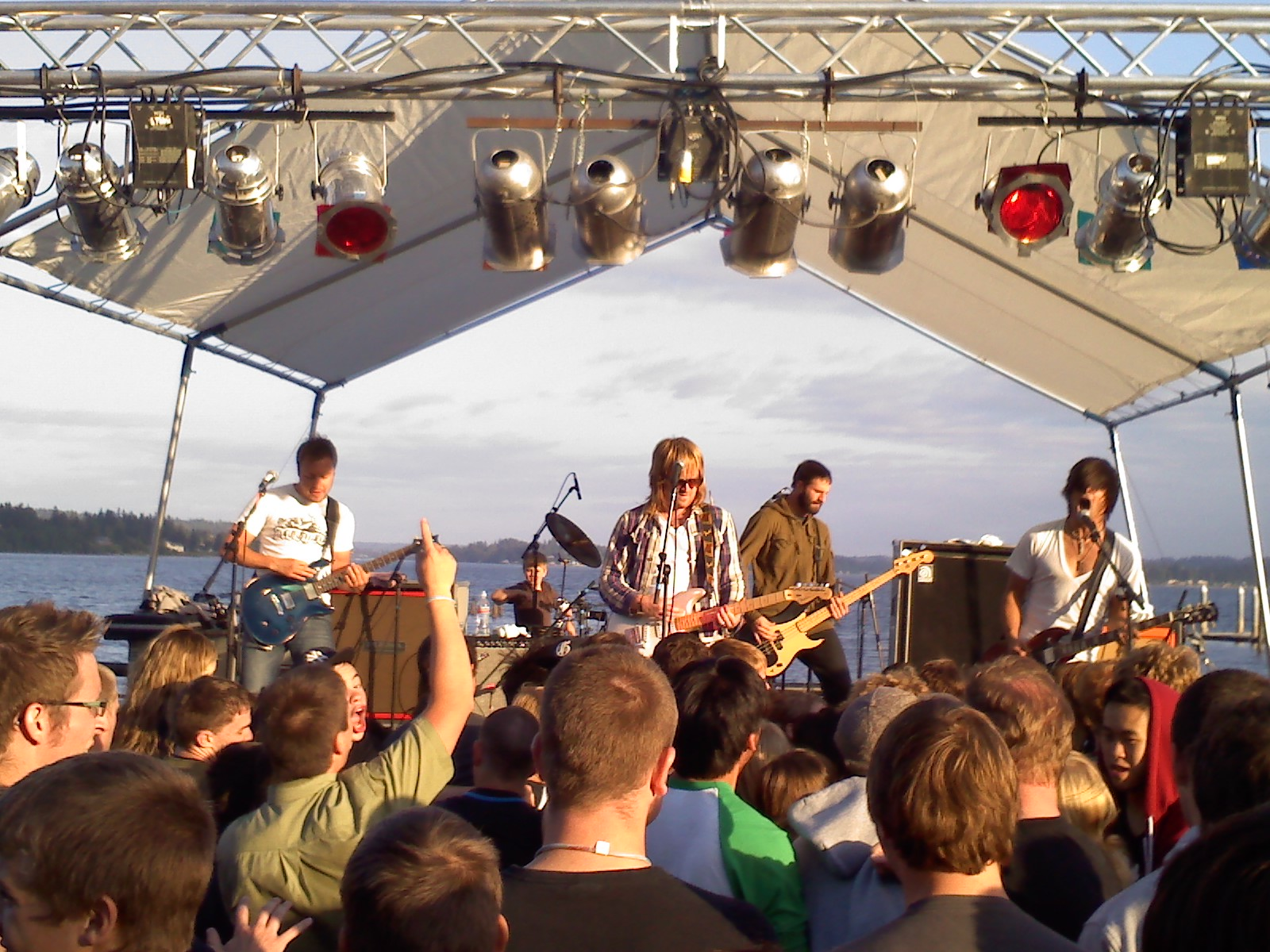
- The Classic Crime playing at the Party At The Pier in Silverdale, Washington.

Background information
- Origin: Seattle, Washington, US
- Genres: Alternative rock, post-grunge, post-hardcore, pop punk
- Years active: 2004–present
- Label: Tooth & Nail
- Members: Matt MacDonald; Paul "Skip" Erickson; Alan Clark; Robert "Cheeze" Negrin
- Past members: Justin DuQue
- Website: www.theclassiccrime.com

The Classic Crime is an American rock band from Seattle, Washington, formed in 2004. The band's current lineup consists of Matt MacDonald (vocals, guitar), Alan Clark (bass), Robert "Cheeze" Negrin (guitar), and Paul "Skip" Erickson (drums, vocals). They have released three albums and an EP on Tooth & Nail Records, two of which, The Silver Cord (2008) and Vagabonds (2010), charted in the Billboard 200. In July 2011, the band left Tooth & Nail to produce a fourth album with the help of fan donations via Kickstarter, called Phoenix (2012). After the success they found in the crowdfunding approach with Phoenix, the band continued using Kickstarter as a means to fund their albums, subsequently releasing What Was Done: Vol. 1 in 2014, How to Be Human in 2017, Patterns in the Static in 2020, and GRIM AGE in 2023.

== Background ==
Their debut album Albatross was released on May 23, 2006. The band accumulated an estimated 10 million plays on Myspace. Albatross had the highest debut sales in the history of Tooth & Nail Records with over 4,000 sales in the first week it was released. The band's second full-length record, The Silver Cord was released July 22, 2008. They also released an EP, Acoustic Seattle Sessions. They finished their third record Vagabonds, which was released April 6, 2010.

The band has toured with A Change of Pace, A Static Lullaby, Quietdrive, I Am Ghost, Relient K, So They Say, Just Surrender, Powerspace, Mest, Allister, Aiden, and Scary Kids Scaring Kids. They have also toured with fellow Tooth & Nail bands Anberlin, Emery, MxPx, Project 86, the Fold, and Run Kid Run. The band was on both the 2006 and 2008 Warped Tour. The Classic Crime also went on a Headlining ATTICUS tour with A Change of Pace, Lower Definition, Tyler Read, Jet Lag Gemini, and Artist vs Poet. They toured in 2009 with Relient K and Owl City.

They were no longer signed to Tooth & Nail Records as of July 2011. With the assistance of a Kickstarter fundraising project, the band released the album Phoenix on August 14, 2012.

On November 8, 2011, Justin DuQue announced that he would be leaving the band following the December 16 concert at the Showbox Sodo in Seattle. He went on to say that he was leaving the band on good terms to pursue a career in health care and to devote more time to being a father.

Matt MacDonald formed a side project with his wife, Kristie, called Vocal Few. They composed an EP to raise money to provide for their daughter, Praise, who was born December 12, 2011.

In December 2012, the Classic Crime became the second band to go public on The New York Rock Exchange.

== Christianity ==
Some fans have assumed that the Classic Crime is a Christian band due to being signed on to Tooth & Nail Records. Also adding to the confusion is that many music stores and online sales list the Classic Crime as a Christian band for the same reason. This is true of iTunes Store. Also, all four of the Classic Crime's full-length albums have charted on Billboard Music's Top Christian Albums music chart. However, the Classic Crime does not label themselves a "Christian" band. As Matt writes on TCC's discussion board, "We believe faith is personal, and can be only held by an individual person. To entitle a group 'Christian' would be to assume that the group has a collective soul, or at least individual souls tied to a solid collective belief. Not everyone in our band is decidedly set in their faith, and we respect that."

== Members ==
- Matt MacDonald – vocals (2004–present), lead guitar (2011–present)
- Alan Clark – bass, backing vocals (2004–present)
- Robert "Cheeze" Negrin – rhythm guitar (2004–present)
- Paul "Skip" Erickson – drums, backing vocals (2004–present)
- Justin DuQue – lead guitar, backing vocals (2004–2011)

Timeline

== Discography ==
=== Studio albums ===
List of studio albums, with selected details and chart positions
Title	Album details	Peak chart positions					
Title	Album details	US	US Heat.	US Christ.	US Hard Rock	US Indie	US Rock
Albatross	Released: May 23, 2006; Label: Tooth & Nail; Formats: CD, digital download	—	12	16	—	—	—
The Silver Cord	Released: July 22, 2008; Label: Tooth & Nail; Formats: CD, digital download	123	—	3	—	—	—
Vagabonds	Released: April 6, 2010; Label: Tooth & Nail; Formats: CD, digital download	105	—	6	6	—	31
Phoenix	Released: August 14, 2012; Label: Independent; Formats: CD, digital download	130	—	4	11	22	44
What Was Done, Vol. 1: A Decade Revisited	Released: October 28, 2014; Formats: CD, digital download	—	—	—	—	—	—
How to Be Human	Released: April 28, 2017; Formats: CD, digital download, LP	95	—	—	—	—	—
Patterns in the Static	Released: February 28, 2020; Formats: CD, digital download, LP	—	—	—	—	—	—
GRIM AGE	Released: March 31, 2023; Formats: CD, digital download	—	—	—	—	—	—

=== EPs ===
List of EPs
Year	Title	Label
2007	Seattle Sessions	Tooth & Nail

=== Music videos ===
List of music videos
Year	Song title	Album	Director
2006	"The Fight"	Albatross	
2006	"The Coldest Heart"	Albatross	
2007	"Seattle"	Seattle Sessions EP	
2008	"Abracadavers"	The Silver Cord	
2010	"Solar Powered Life"	Vagabonds	
2012	"The Precipice"	Phoenix	Dan Dobi
2013	"What I'd Give Up"	Phoenix	Robbie Negrin
2017	"Ghost"	How to Be Human	James Wightman
2018	"Not Done with You Yet"	How to Be Human	Robbie Negrin
2020	"The Outside"	Patterns in the Static	James Wightman
2020	"Highlights"	Patterns in the Static	James Wightman
2023	"Rageboi"	GRIM AGE	James Wightman
2023	"The End of Everything"	GRIM AGE	James Wightman
2023	"Right Now"	GRIM AGE	James Wightman
