= Prepare the Masses =

Studio album by A Change of Pace
- Released: August 15, 2006
- Studios: Bavon, VA @ Studio Barbarosa
- Genres: Pop punk, alternative rock
- Length: 42:19
- Label: Immortal
- Producers: Michael "Elvis" Baskette; David E. Holdredge

A Change of Pace chronology
An Offer You Can't Refuse (2005)	Prepare the Masses (2006)	Just No Better Way (2008)

Professional ratings
Review scores
Source	Rating
AbsolutePunk.net	(31%)
Allmusic	4.5/5 stars
EmotionalPunk	8.0/10.0 stars
Melodic	3.5/5 stars
Sputnikmusic	3.5/5.0 stars

Prepare the Masses is the second album by pop punk band A Change of Pace. It was released on August 15, 2006. The album doesn't contain screaming lyrics (except for "How to Rape a Country") as in the previous album, An Offer You Can't Refuse, and was noted to contain "Arena-riffs" when reviewed by AllMusic and Sputnik. "Shoot from the Hip" and "Weekend Warriors" impacted radio on May 1, 2007.

== Track listing ==
Prepare the Masses track listing
No.	Title	Writer(s)	Composer(s)	Length
1.	"Prepare the Masses"	Torry Jasper	A Change of Pace	3:53
2.	"How to Rape a Country"	Jasper	A Change of Pace	3:21
3.	"I'm Alive"	Jasper	A Change of Pace	3:10
4.	"Shoot from the Hip"	Jasper	A Change of Pace; Michael "Elvis" Baskette	3:37
5.	"Weekend Warriors"	Jasper	A Change of Pace; Jamie Houston	3:03
6.	"White Lines and Lipstick"	Jasper	A Change of Pace	3:47
7.	"A Song the World Can Sing Out Loud"	Jasper	A Change of Pace; David E. Holdredge	3:34
8.	"Take Care"	Jasper	A Change of Pace	3:51
9.	"War in Your Bedroom"	Jasper	A Change of Pace; David E. Holdredg	3:38
10.	"I Wanna Be Your Rock & Roll"	Jasper	A Change of Pace	3:27
11.	"Recipe for Disaster"	Jasper	A Change of Pace	3:07
12.	"Safe and Sound in Phone Lines"	Jasper	A Change of Pace	3:51
Total length:				42:19

== Personnel ==
- Torry Jasper – vocals
- Adam Rodgers – lead guitar
- Dan Parker - guitar, vocals
- Johnny Abdullah - bass
- Jonathan Kelley - drums
- Michael "Elvis" Baskette - producer, mixing
- Dave Holdredge - producer, engineer, mixing
- Jef Moll - digital editing, programming
