= Brainless =

Brainless may refer to:

- "Brainless", a 1995 song by The Urge, from the album Receiving the Gift of Flavor
- "Brainless", a 2013 song by Eminem, from the album The Marshall Mathers LP 2
- "Brainless", an episode of Round the Twist, 2000

== See also ==
- Anencephaly, the absence of a major portion of the brain, skull, and scalp that occurs during embryonic development.
