= HBE =

HBE may refer to:

- Borg El Arab Airport, near Alexandria, Egypt
- Hemoglobin E (HbE)
- His Boy Elroy, an American band
- The Hugh Beaumont Experience, an American band
- Human behavioral ecology
- Hurstbridge railway station, in Victoria, Australia
- Hypnotic Brass Ensemble, an American band
- Hard Boiled Egg, egg that is boiled hard.
