= An Offer You Can't Refuse (album) =

Studio album by A Change of Pace
- Released: March 22, 2005
- Genre: Post-hardcore
- Length: 37:38
- Label: Immortal
- Producer: Michael "Elvis" Baskette

A Change of Pace chronology
Change Is the Only Constant (2003)	An Offer You Can't Refuse (2005)	Prepare the Masses (2006)

Professional ratings
Review scores
Source	Rating
Allmusic	3.5/5 stars
Melodic	3.5/5 stars

An Offer You Can't Refuse is the debut full-length album released by A Change of Pace on March 22, 2005. The album was recorded while the members of the band were still in high school. There was only one single released from this album, "Loose Lips Sink Ships". A few of the tracks that appear on the record are re-recorded versions of songs from the Change Is the Only Constant EP. The title of the album is a lyric taken from the song "Loose Lips Sink Ships" and is also reference to the famous phrase from The Godfather.

Between mid June and mid August, the group went on the 2005 edition of Warped Tour. In late 2005, the group went on the Myspace tour, between October and December, alongside Greeley Estates, My American Heart, Agent Sparks and The Confession.

== Track listing ==
1. "Loose Lips Sink Ships" 3:53
2. "Death Do Us Part" 3:23
3. "Every Second" 3:18
4. "Asleep at the Wheel" 3:10
5. "December" 3:07
6. "Know One Knows" 3:23
7. "Home is Where the Heart Is" 3:42
8. "A Farewell to Friendship" 3:51
9. "Chippie" 3:03
10. "Goodbye for Now" 3:53
11. "Queen of Hearts" 4:08
