= Say Yeah =

Say Yeah may refer to:

- "Say Yeah" (Kiss song), 2009
- "Say Yeah" (The Urge song), 2011
- "Say Yeah" (Wiz Khalifa song), 2008
- "Say Yeah" (Yves Larock song), 2008
- "Say Yeah", a 1984 song by The Limit
- "Say Yeah!: Motto Miracle Night", a song by Morning Musume from the album Best! Morning Musume 1

== See also ==
- "I Say Yeah!", by Neosite artists
- "We Say Yeah", by Cliff Richard & the Shadows
