= Jump Right In (The Urge song) =

Single by The Urge

from the album Master of Styles
- Released: 1998
- Genre: Alternative rock, ska
- Length: 3:43
- Label: Immortal Records
- Songwriters: The Urge, Nick Hexum
- Producer: GGGarth

"Jump Right In" is a song recorded by The Urge and the third track from their 1998 album Master of Styles. It features vocals by 311 vocalist Nick Hexum. It is one of the band's most well-known songs and has been a live staple in every concert.

== In popular culture ==
The song has been used in an episode of Daria entitled "Ill" and The Real World.

== Chart performance ==
The song debuted at No. 38 on April 11, 1998, and peaked at No. 10 on the Billboard Modern Rock Tracks chart on July 4, 1998.

Chart (1998)	Peak position
US Billboard Modern Rock Tracks	10
US Billboard Alternative Airplay	10
