= Scary Kids Scaring Kids =

American post-hardcore band

- Origin: Gilbert, Arizona, U.S.
- Genres: Post-hardcore; emo; screamo; alternative rock
- Years active: 2002–2010, 2019–present
- Labels: Immortal, RCA, Velocity, Equal Vision
- Members: Chad Crawford; Pouyan Afkary; Albert Schweizer; Colton Westerman; Kash Jaeger; Josh Kikta
- Past members: Tyson Stevens; DJ Wilson; Steve Kirby; Justin Salter; James Ethridge; Tanner Wayne; Derek Smith; Peter Costa
- Website: skskband.com

Scary Kids Scaring Kids (abbreviated SKSK) is an American post-hardcore band formed in Gilbert, Arizona in 2002.

The band's name was taken from the Cap'n Jazz song of the same name. They released two studio albums The City Sleeps in Flames (2005) and the self-titled Scary Kids Scaring Kids (2007) with the late member and lead vocalist Tyson Stevens. The band disbanded following a farewell tour in 2010. In 2019, the group reunited and released their third studio album, Out of Light (2022).

== History ==
=== 2002–2005: Early years, After Dark and The City Sleeps In Flames ===
The band – which originally was composed of Tyson Stevens on bass guitar and lead vocals (later to be strictly the vocalist/songwriter), guitarists Chad Crawford, DJ Wilson (later to switch to bass) and Steve Kirby, Pouyan Afkary on keyboards, and drummer Peter Costa – recorded their self-financed debut EP, After Dark, while they were still in Highland High School. The band graduated from Highland in 2003. After Dark was eventually re-released by Immortal Records in 2005. After nearly disbanding, they decided to pursue the band full-time.

The band was then signed to Immortal Records, where they released their first album: The City Sleeps in Flames. The album was recorded during February and March 2005 with producer Brian McTernan, and released on June 28, 2005.

=== 2006–2007: Self titled album ===
Scary Kids Scaring Kids, released on August 28, 2007, and produced by Don Gilmore (who previously worked on Dashboard Confessional, Good Charlotte, Linkin Park, and Trust Company records) in North Hollywood, California, was the result of much consideration and effort by the band, even though they had spent most of the year living on the road. The band specifically wanted the record to be a composed album, rather than a collection of songs thrown together. This is evidenced by transitions between songs, a prelude and an interlude, as well as references throughout the album to previous tracks on the record.

In 2007, Scary Kids Scaring Kids was awarded Best Noise/Screamo Band at the 2007 Arizona Ska Punk Awards Ceremony in Phoenix, Arizona. They took home the Best Noise/Screamo Band Award again in 2010, and won the Best Independent Band Award in 2009.

In January 2008, the band was awarded a Libby Award by PETA for Best Newcomers. Scary Kids Scaring Kids received the award for their work in speaking up against Chicken Express for the PETA's 'I Am Not A Nugget' campaign.^{outdated link}

=== 2008–2019: Label change, break-up, Tyson Stevens death and "Loved Forever" ===
The band left Immortal Records and signed their major label deal with RCA Records. During their fall tour with Anberlin, Straylight Run, and There for Tomorrow, the band announced they would be working on their third studio album at the end of the tour, but decided to part ways before tracking new material.

Lead singer Tyson took some personal time off in the last four days of the 2009 Warped Tour and the band had tour members Craig Mabbitt of Escape the Fate, Brandon Bolmer formerly of Chiodos, Vic Fuentes of Pierce the Veil and Cove Reber, formerly of Saosin, filling in on vocals for the rest of the tour.

On November 30, 2009, Afkary posted an official statement declaring that by mutual agreement the group decided to disband following a farewell tour in 2010.

Derek Smith served as the band's drummer for their farewell tour and opened shows with his new hip hop act, Mod Sun. The album that the band was recording in 2009 was never finished as the band did not record vocals for it.

On October 20, 2014, vocalist Tyson Stevens died at the age of 29. On September 29, 2019, Scary Kids Scaring Kids released a song titled "Loved Forever" to honor what would have been a wish of Stevens's 34th birthday. The song was written and sang by rhythm guitarist Chad Crawford and produced by Hiram Hernandez.

=== 2019–present: Return, rotating touring lineup Out of Light and Maps Written in Water ===
On November 18, 2019, members Crawford, Afkary and Costa announced that Scary Kids Scaring Kids would be reuniting for The City Sleeps in Flames 15-year anniversary tour alongside touring members featuring Saosin and Dead American frontman Cove Reber on vocals, Don Vedda on lead guitar and Jordan Flower on bass. The tour lasted from January 13 to 24, 2020, in partnership with To Write Love On Her Arms. Additional East Coast dates were announced to take place between June 27, and July 12, with support from The Classic Crime, Picturesque, and Eidola, but were postponed due to COVID-19 pandemic.

On February 4, 2021, Scary Kids Scaring Kids announced signing to Velocity Records and teased recording some new material in studio via Instagram.

The rescheduled East Coast dates were played from September 17 to October 1, 2021, with Eidola being switched out with The Villa. During this tour Scary Kids Scaring Kids occasionally performed a new song titled "Knock It All Down" live.

On October 5, 2021, the band announced they would be releasing "The Lost Album Demos" (2010) composed of scratch tracks, demos and raw ideas that were intended to develop into their 4th studio release back in 2010, exclusively via their Discord channel.

On December 18, 2021, Velocity Records Tour 2022 consisting of SKSK, D.R.U.G.S., Dead American and Secrets was announced to take place from February 16 to March 20, 2022. This tour was eventually played with Kurt Travis (Royal Coda, ex-Dance Gavin Dance) filling in on lead vocals.

On December 19 and 23, 2021, the band played two shows with Donovan Melero (of Hail the Sun and Sianvar) on lead vocals.

On February 22, 2022, the band released "Knock It All Down (feat. Lil Lotus)", the first single off the third album titled Out of Light. A second single titled "Nightmare" was released with Spencer Charnas from Ice Nine Kills a month later. Out of Light was released on May 27, 2022, to mixed reviews. Each track on the album features a different guest vocalist.

In January 2023, the band played a mini-tour (including performance at Kill Iconic Records 23) with Craig Mabbitt on vocals. In May-June 2023, SKSK played a tour featuring vocalists Albert Schweizer (ex-Violent New Breed) and Paul Rose (ex-Cover Your Tracks, ex-Curses).

Maps Written in Water, the band's fourth studio album, preceded by singles "Blackout" (feat. Rat Park), "State of Disrepair" (feat. Paul Rose), "Oblivion" (feat. Kat Leon), "Suspended in Air" (feat. Albert Schweizer) is set to be released independently on July 11, 2025. Like Out of Light, it's going to feature a guest lead vocalist on every song, including Tilian, Andy Cizek, Toby Morrell, Lacey Sturm, Craig Mabbitt and Myke Terry among others.

In February 2026, the band was announced as part of the lineup for the Louder Than Life music festival in Louisville, scheduled to take place in September.

In September 2026, Scary Kids Scaring Kids announced that Albert Schweizer had become the band's permanent lead vocalist, following more than three years of performing with the group. The band also announced that Colton "Coba" Westerman had officially joined as a full member on bass and vocals. Both Schweizer and Westerman contributed to the songwriting, arrangements and creative direction of the band's upcoming album RISE. The announcement coincided with the release of "Something in the Water", the first single from RISE and the first release to feature the new lineup.

== Influences ==
They cited influences including Thrice, Poison the Well, At the Drive-In, Glassjaw, Deftones and Rage Against the Machine.

== Band members ==
Current members

- Chad Crawford – lead and rhythm guitar, vocals (2002–2010; 2019–present)
- Pouyan Afkary – keyboards, synthesizers, programming, piano, backing vocals (2002–2010; 2019–present)
- Albert Schweizer – lead vocals (2026–present; touring: 2023–2026)
- Colton Westerman – bass (2026–present, touring; 2023–2026)

Former members

- Tyson Stevens – lead vocals, additional guitar, programming (2002–2010); bass (2002–2004; died 2014)
- DJ Wilson – bass, backing vocals (2004–2010); lead guitar (2002–2004)
- Peter Costa – drums, percussion (2002–2005; 2019–2022)
- Steve Kirby – lead and rhythm guitar, backing vocals (2004–2010)
- Justin Salter – drums, percussion (2005–2007)
- James Ethridge – drums, percussion (2007–2009)
- Tanner Wayne – drums, percussion (2009)
- Derek Smith – drums, percussion (2009–2010)

Session Musicians

- Kash Jaeger – drums, percussion (2026–present, touring; 2023-2026)
- Josh Kikta – guitar (2026–present)

Current touring musicians

- Johnny Natoli – lead and rhythm guitar (2024–present)

Former touring musicians

- Brandon Bolmer – lead vocals (2009)
- Vic Fuentes – lead vocals (2009)
- Craig Mabbitt – lead vocals (2009, 2022–2023)
- Cove Reber – lead vocals (2009, 2019–2021, 2022)
- Don Vedda – guitars, backing vocals (2019–2020)
- Lil Lotus – lead vocals (2021–2022; featured live on "Knock It All Down" only)
- Donovan Melero – lead vocals (2021-2022; occasionally featured live on "Black Hole" only)
- Cody Ash – drums (2022)
- Joe Arrington – drums (2022–2023)
- Kurt Travis – lead vocals (2022, 2023)
- Jordan Flower – bass, backing vocals (2019–2023)
- Paul Rose – lead vocals (2023)
- Jared Gaines – guitar, backing vocals (2019–2024)

Timeline

== Discography ==
Studio albums

- The City Sleeps in Flames (2005)
- Scary Kids Scaring Kids (2007)
- Out of Light (2022)
- Maps Written In Water (2025)

EPs

- After Dark (2004) (reissued in 2005 and 2007 on CD, and in 2017 on vinyl)
- Saltmine Sessions (2024)

== Singles ==
Year	Song	Album
2003	"Bulletproof"	After Dark
2003	"What's Up Now"	After Dark
2005	"The Only Medicine"	The City Sleeps in Flames
2005	"My Darkest Hour"	The City Sleeps in Flames
2007	"Faces"	Scary Kids Scaring Kids
2007	"Snake Devil"	Scary Kids Scaring Kids
2019	"Loved Forever"	Non-album single
2022	"Knock It All Down" (featuring Lil Lotus)	Out of Light
2022	"Nightmare" (featuring Spencer Charnas)	Out of Light
2022	"Escape from My Reality" (featuring Mod Sun)	Out of Light
2024	"Blackout" (featuring Rat Park)	Maps Written in Water
2025	"State of Disrepair" (featuring Paul Rose)	Maps Written in Water
2025	"Oblivion" (featuring Kat Leon)	Maps Written in Water
2025	"Suspended in Air" (featuring Albert Schweizer)	Maps Written in Water

== Other appearances ==
Title	Year	Album
"Losing My Religion" (R.E.M. cover)	2006	Punk Goes 90's
"What a Wonderful World" (Louis Armstrong cover)	2006	A Santa Cause: It's a Punk Rock Christmas Vol. 2
"Notorious Thugs" (The Notorious B.I.G. cover)	2008	Punk Goes Crunk
