= The Silver Cord =

The Silver Cord may refer to:

- The Silver Cord (The Classic Crime album), 2008
- The Silver Cord (King Gizzard & the Lizard Wizard album), 2023, or the title song
- The Silver Cord (film), a 1933 American film directed by John Cromwell
- The Silver Cord, a 1926 play by Sidney Howard, basis for the film
- Silver cord, a concept in metaphysical studies and literature
- Silvercord, a shopping centre and office complex in Hong Kong
- "The Silver Cord", a song by French metal band Gojira
