= Too Much Stereo =

Studio album by The Urge
- Released: July 18, 2000
- Recorded: Royaltone
- Genres: Alternative rock; reggae
- Length: 36:38
- Label: Immortal
- Producer: Clif Magness

The Urge chronology
Master of Styles (1998)	Too Much Stereo (2000)	Galvanized (2013)

Professional ratings
Review scores
Source	Rating
Allmusic	4/5 stars

Too Much Stereo is the sixth studio album by alternative rock band The Urge. It was released in 2000 through Immortal Records in cassette and CD format. The album produced two singles, “Too Much Stereo" and "Four Letters and Two Words", and sold 125,000 copies. An advance copy was released with different cover art. This was their last studio album before their disbandment in 2001, until their reunion in 2011 and their 2013 album, Galvanized.

== Track listing ==
All tracks are written by The Urge, except "Liar Liar" by The Urge and Clif Magness.

No.	Title	Length
1.	"What Is This"	3:09
2.	"Too Much Stereo"	3:27
3.	"What Do They Know"	3:10
4.	"Four Letters And Two Words"	3:38
5.	"Liar Liar"	3:07
6.	"I Go Home"	4:17
7.	"Say A Prayer"	3:14
8.	"Welcome To Gunville"	3:02
9.	"Living On The Surface"	3:21
10.	"Push On Like Flintstone"	3:35
11.	"Warning Warning"	3:18
Total length:		36:38

== Personnel ==
All credits from Allmusic.
The Urge

- Steve Ewing - vocals
- Karl Grable - bass
- Jerry Jost - guitars
- John Pessoni - drums, percussion, background vocals
- Bill Reiter - saxophone, organ
- Matt Kwiatkowski - trombone

Other personnel

- Jason Brennan - assistant engineer
- Chris Fogel, Chris Lord-Alge - mixing
- Steve Griffen - associate producer, drum Loop, editing, engineer, programming
- Steve Kaplan, Howard Kalp, Matt Silva - assistant engineers
- Clif Magness - composer for "Liar, Liar", engineer, producer
- Stephen Marcussen - mastering
- Matt Silva - assistant engineer
- Roger Sommers - engineer, mixing
- Stephen Stickler - concept, photography
- Jai Winding - organ

== Charts ==
Chart (2000)	Peak position
US Billboard Billboard 200	200
US Billboard Top Album Sales	200
US Billboard Top Current Album Sales	200
US Billboard Heatseekers	12
