= Scary Kids Scaring Kids (album) =

Studio album by Scary Kids Scaring Kids
- Released: August 28, 2007
- Genres: Post-hardcore; emo; metalcore
- Length: 51:54
- Label: Immortal
- Producer: Don Gilmore

Scary Kids Scaring Kids chronology
The City Sleeps In Flames (2005)	Scary Kids Scaring Kids (2007)	Out of Light (2022)

Singles from Scary Kids Scaring Kids
- 1. "Faces" Released: July 4, 2007; 2. "The Deep End" Released: August 26, 2008; 3. "Snake Devil" Released: October 26, 2008

Professional ratings
Review scores
Source	Rating
AbsolutePunk	68%
Alternative Press	3/5
Melodic	3.5/5 stars

Scary Kids Scaring Kids is the second studio album by American post-hardcore band Scary Kids Scaring Kids, and the last before their hiatus from 2010 to 2019. It was released on August 28, 2007 on Immortal Records and produced by Don Gilmore (who had previously worked on albums of Dashboard Confessional, Good Charlotte, Linkin Park, and Trust Company). The band specifically wanted the record to be a composed album, rather than a collection of songs thrown together. This is evidenced by transitions between songs, a prelude and an interlude, as well as references throughout the album to previous tracks on the record.

On July 4, 2007, the band posted a picture on their MySpace page saying "it begins...", and there was much speculation as to what that may have meant. On the same day, the band released more information about the album, as well as the first single from it, "Faces", on their Myspace page. "The Deep End" was the second single released from the album on August 26, 2008. The single "Snake Devil" was released as a digital single on iTunes on October 26, 2008, and was an iTunes' "Single of the Week". The single was featured in the games SCORE International Baja 1000 and The Sims 2: Teen Style stuff pack.

The album peaked at #80 on the Billboard 200 in the US. This was the band's last album before their break-up in 2010 and the death of lead singer Tyson Stevens in 2014.

"Faces" was included on Alternative Press's "Top 46 Post-hardcore Songs from the 2000s" list.

== Track listing ==
No.	Title	Length
1.	"Prelude"	0:40
2.	"Degenerates"	3:46
3.	"Holding On"	4:25
4.	"The Deep End"	4:16
5.	"Faces"	3:25
6.	"A Pistol to My Temple"	4:02
7.	"Star Crossed"	3:41
8.	"Derailed"	1:43
9.	"Breathe"	1:19
10.	"Set Sail"	3:25
11.	"Free Again"	3:53
12.	"Snake Devil"	3:30
13.	"Watch Me Bleed"	4:00
14.	"Goes Without Saying"	4:04
15.	"Blood Runs Forever"	3:22
16.	"The Power of Resolution"	2:06
Total length:		51:54

== Personnel ==
Band

- Tyson Stevens - lead vocals, additional guitar, lyrics, programming
- James Ethridge - drums, percussion
- Chad Crawford - guitar, vocals
- DJ Wilson - bass guitar, backing vocals
- Steve Kirby - guitar, backing vocals
- Pouyan Afkary - keyboards, synthesizer, piano, programming, backing vocals

Other musicians

- Justin Salter - drums (additional)
