= Twistable, Turnable Man: A Musical Tribute to the Songs of Shel Silverstein =

Compilation album by Various Artists
- Released: June 2010
- Genre: Country
- Length: 58:06
- Label: Sugar Hill
- Producers: Bobby Bare, Bobby Bare, Jr.

Twistable Turnable Man is a tribute album to Shel Silverstein. It was released in 2010 by Sugar Hill Records.

Most of the tracks feature Chip Young on acoustic guitar.

== Track listing ==
All tracks are written by Shel Silverstein except where noted.

No.	Title	Writer(s)	Performer	Length
1.	"Lullabys, Legends & Lies"		My Morning Jacket	3:24
2.	"The Twistable, Turnable Man Returns"	Andrew Bird, Shel Silverstein	Andrew Bird	3:02
3.	"This Guitar Is For Sale"	Fred Koller, Shel Silverstein	John Prine	4:38
4.	"The Unicorn"		Dr. Dog	4:21
5.	"The Winner"		Kris Kristofferson	4:58
6.	"Queen of the Silver Dollar"		Sarah Jarosz, Black Prairie	5:02
7.	"Daddy What If"		Isabella Bare, Bobby Bare, Jr.	2:58
8.	"The Cover of the Rolling Stone"		Black Francis, Joey Santiago	3:36
9.	"Sylvia's Mother"		The Boxmasters	3:16
10.	"Me & Jimmy Rodgers"		Ray Price	3:53
11.	"A Boy Named Sue"		Todd Snider	4:09
12.	"The Ballad of Lucy Jordan"		Lucinda Williams	5:22
13.	"The Living Legend"		Bobby Bare	3:25
14.	"The Giving Tree"		Nanci Griffith	5:35
15.	"26 Second Song"		My Morning Jacket	0:27
Total length:				58:06
