= Justin Salter =

American drummer (born 1984)

Justin M. Salter
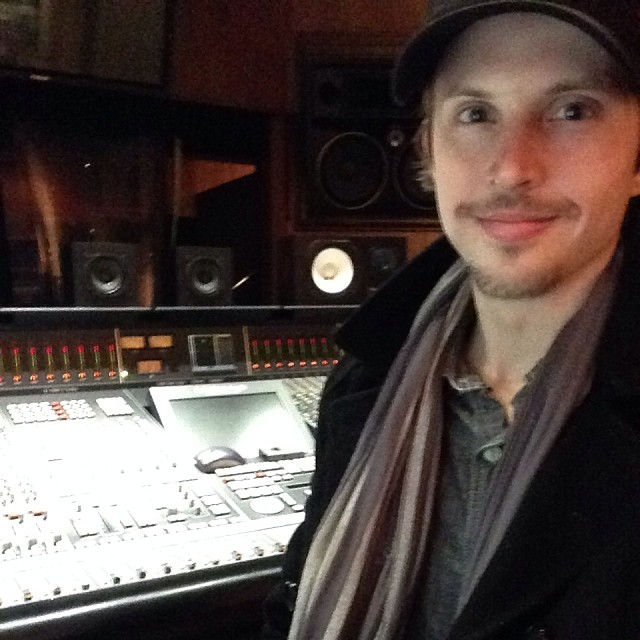

Background information
- Born: August 6, 1984 (age 41); Phoenix, Arizona, United States
- Genres: Alternative rock, hard rock, hip hop, gospel, soul
- Occupations: Musician, composer, record producer
- Instruments: Drums, guitar, piano, vocals
- Years active: 2005–present

Justin Salter (born August 6, 1984) is an American musician, drummer, film composer, and record producer. He is best known as the former drummer from the American rock band Scary Kids Scaring Kids. He went on to engineer and assist for many other artists and producers including Alicia Keys, Aaliyah, Snoop Dogg, Lil' Wayne, Jonas Brothers, Young MC, Talib Kweli, Mark McKenzie, John Fields and Andraé Crouch. He recently composed the original score for the film documentary The Vision of Paolo Soleri: Prophet in the Desert, the soundtrack for the film features music by Thirty Seconds to Mars, Andrea Bocelli and CKY . He also recently produced and wrote music for the America's Got Talent star Anna Graceman.

He lives in Los Angeles, California and is currently writing and producing songs for his new projects American rock band Across The Great Divide & The Constellation Program.
