= The City Sleeps in Flames =

Studio album by Scary Kids Scaring Kids
- Released: June 28, 2005
- Recorded: February–March 2005
- Genre: Post-hardcore; emo; screamo; scene music
- Length: 40:14
- Label: Immortal
- Producer: Brian McTernan

Scary Kids Scaring Kids chronology
After Dark (2003)	The City Sleeps in Flames (2005)	Scary Kids Scaring Kids (2007)

Professional ratings
Review scores
Source	Rating
AllMusic	3.5/5 stars
Punknews	1.5/5 stars

The City Sleeps in Flames is the debut studio album by American post-hardcore band Scary Kids Scaring Kids, released through Immortal Records on June 28, 2005. The album produced three music videos, for the songs "The Only Medicine", "My Darkest Hour" and the title track. The title of the album and the song of the same name refers to the group's loss of structure in their lives, creating a new one on the road. The cover recalls the final scene of the movie Fight Club. The song "The World as We Know It" makes a reference to the movie 28 Days Later ("A virus known as Rage is brutally destroying and spreading all over the place").

Billboard described the album as "a cathartic tour de force of twin guitar leads and bleeding-heart lyricism", singling out "The Only Medicine" and "My Darkest Hour" as classics of the post-hardcore genre. It reached number 50 on the Billboard Top Heatseekers Chart.

== Track listing ==
1. "The City Sleeps in Flames" – 4:01
2. "The Only Medicine" – 2:51
3. "The World As We Know It" – 3:02
4. "What's Said Is Done" – 3:45
5. "Just a Taste" – 3:52
6. "My Darkest Hour" – 3:29
7. "Drowning You in Fear" – 3:12
8. "The Bright Side of Suffering" – 4:02
9. "Empty Glasses" – 2:50
10. "Faith in the Knife" – 3:27
11. "A Breath of Sunshine" – 5:45

== Personnel ==
- Tyson Stevens - lead vocals, bass, guitars
- Pete Costa - drums, percussion
- Chad Crawford - rhythm and lead guitars, vocals
- DJ Wilson - bass, guitars
- Steve Kirby - lead and rhythm guitars
- Pouyan Afkary - keyboards, programming, backing vocals
