= Brainwasher =

Studio album by Bare Jr.
- Released: October 10, 2000
- Recorded: Dark Horse Recording Studios, Franklin, Tennessee
- Genre: Roots rock
- Length: 41:06
- Label: Immortal, Virgin

Bare Jr. chronology
Boo-Tay (1998)	Brainwasher (2000)	Young Criminals' Starvation League (2002)

Brainwasher is the second and final studio album by Bobby Bare Jr.'s band Bare Jr. It was released on October 10, 2000, on Immortal Records and Virgin Records.

== Critical reception ==
Professional ratings
Review scores
Source	Rating
AllMusic	2.5/5 stars
The Austin Chronicle	3/4 stars
Chicago Tribune	unfavorable
CMJ New Music Monthly	mixed
No Depression	favorable
The Village Voice	(choice cut)

In a favorable review of Brainwasher, Mike Warren wrote that the album "...offers plenty of genuine rock and roll moments, and [Bobby] Bare [Jr.]'s an honors graduate from the "walking wounded but still willing to take a pratfall" school of songwriting." In the January 2001 issue of CMJ New Music Monthly, Meredith Ochs wrote that the album's "...string-and-piano overture is so goofy that it does justice to the shenanigans to come." She also praised Tracy Hackney's electric dulcimer parts on the album.

== Track listing ==
1. "Overture (Love Theme from Brainwasher)" – 1:13
2. "Brainwasher" – 3:58
3. "If You Choose Me" – 3:46
4. "Why Do I Need a Job" – 2:43
5. "You Never Knew (I Lied)" – 3:31
6. "Shine" – 3:17
7. "God" – 4:35
8. "Miss You the Most" – 3:07
9. "Kiss Me (Or I Will Cry)" – 2:13
10. "Dog" – 3:36
11. "Limpin'" – 3:17
12. "Devil Doll" – 3:21
13. "Untitled" – 0:26
14. "Gasoline Listerine" – 2:03
