= April's Motel Room =

American rock band

- Origin: Simi Valley, California
- Genres: Alternative rock, post-grunge
- Labels: Immortal, Epic
- Past members: Tom Kelly; Sam Nickell; Mike Hoolihan; John Baffa; Erin Zidenberg

April's Motel Room was an American rock band from Simi Valley, California. The band released one studio album, Black 14, in 1994 through Immortal, an imprint of Epic Records. Despite the album's generally positive reviews, its sales were low. The group's music has been described as a mixture of grunge and the Grateful Dead, with Washington Post writer Geoffrey Himes describing the voice of lead singer Tom Kelly as "a dead ringer for Eddie Vedder."

== Members ==
- Tom Kelly- Vocals
- Sam Nickell- Guitar
- Mike Hoolihan- Bass
- John Baffa- Percussion
- Aaron Zidenberg- Drums

== Discography ==
- Black 14 (1994, Immortal/Epic)
