= Young Criminals' Starvation League =

Studio album by Bobby Bare Jr.
- Released: July 9, 2002
- Genre: Rock; alternative rock; alternative country; psychedelic rock
- Length: 38:51
- Label: Bloodshot
- Producer: Bobby Bare Jr.; Mark Nevers

Bobby Bare Jr. chronology
Brainwasher (2000)	Young Criminals' Starvation League (2002)	From the End of Your Leash (2004)

Young Criminals' Starvation League is the first studio album by American singer-songwriter Bobby Bare Jr. The album was released in July 2002 and has been described as "melancholy, decidedly disheveled, and rootsy". It has elements of alternative rock and alternative country, along with "a fascination with early-1970s classic country".

== Track listing ==
All writing by Bobby Bare Jr. except where noted.

No.	Title	Writer(s)	Length
1.	"I'll Be Around"		4:36
2.	"Flat Chested Girl from Maynardville"		3:49
3.	"Mehan"		3:08
4.	"Bullet Through My Teeth"		2:40
5.	"The Monk at the Disco"		2:52
6.	"Dig Down"		3:50
7.	"What Difference Does It Make"	The Smiths	3:44
8.	"The Ending"		3:21
9.	"Untitled"		0:51
10.	"Stay in Texas"		2:32
11.	"Paintin' Her Fingernails"	Shel Silverstein	7:18
Total length:			38:51

== Personnel ==
- Bobby Bare Jr. – guitar, harmonica, vocals
- Kevin Teel – guitar, bass, steel guitar, mandolin
- Paul Burch – drums
- Lloyd Barry, George Chambers, Waldo Weathers – horns
- Tony Crow – keyboard
- Carey Kotsionis – background vocals
- Paul Niehaus – steel guitar
- Matt Swanson – bass
- Artwork by Thomas Petillo and Markus Greiner
