= Seattle Sessions =

EP by the Classic Crime
- Released: November 6, 2007
- Genre: Acoustic, rock
- Length: 29:12
- Label: Tooth & Nail
- Producer: Matt Bayles

The Classic Crime chronology
| Albatross (2006) | Seattle Sessions (2007) | The Silver Cord (2008) |

Professional ratings
Review scores
| Source | Rating |
|---|---|
| AbsolutePunk.net | 81% |
| AllMusic | 4.5/5 stars |
| Jesus Freak Hideout | 5/5 stars |

Seattle Sessions is an acoustic EP released by The Classic Crime in 2007 through Tooth & Nail Records.

== Track listing ==
1. "Seattle" – 4:31
2. "Blindfolded" – 2:37
3. "The Test" – 3:58
4. "Wake Up (Shipwreck)" – 4:34
5. "The Drink In My Hand" – 5:09
6. "When The Time Comes" – 3:51
7. "Far From Home" – 4:35

== Personnel ==
The Classic Crime

- Matt MacDonald - vocals, guitars, keyboards
- Justin Duque - guitars, piano, background vocals
- Robbie Negrin - guitars, background vocals
- Alan Clark - bass guitar
- Paul "Skip" Erickson - drums, background vocals

Additional personnel

- Kristie Macdonald - vocals
- Ruth Erickson - vocals
- Matt Bayles - piano, percussion
