= Love and a .45 (soundtrack) =

Soundtrack album by Various artists
- Released: 1994
- Length: 45:09
- Label: Immortal Records/ Epic Records

Professional ratings
Review scores
Source	Rating
AllMusic	link

Love and a .45 is the soundtrack album to the 1994 road film of the same name.

== Track listing ==
No.	Title	Writer(s)	Performer	Length
1.	"Turn It On"	The Flaming Lips	The Flaming Lips	4:42
2.	"Animal"	Curt Kirkwood	Meat Puppets	4:31
3.	"Ghost Highway"	David Roback	Mazzy Star	3:26
4.	"Come On"	Jim Reid	The Jesus and Mary Chain	2:15
5.	"Love Hurts"	Boudleaux Bryant	Kim Deal & Robert Pollard	4:12
6.	"The Devil's Chasing Me"	James C. Heath	The Reverend Horton Heat	4:18
7.	"Black"	Tom Kelly	April's Motel Room	4:49
8.	"Unter dem Doppeladler"	Franz Wagner	FSK With David Lowery	3:41
9.	"Who Was In My Room Last Night?"	Butthole Surfers	Butthole Surfers	4:09
10.	"Ring of Fire"	June Carter Cash/Merle Kilgore	Johnny Cash	2:37
11.	"Am I in Love"	Courtney Lee Adams/Pascal Tigar	Courtney & Western	3:07
12.	"King of the Road"	Roger Miller	Roger Miller	2:29
Total length:				45:09
