= Undefeated (Bobby Bare Jr. album) =

Studio album by Bobby Bare Jr.
- Released: April 15, 2014
- Genre: indie rock; bluegrass; Americana; alternative country; pop
- Length: 37:32
- Label: Bloodshot Records
- Producer: Bobby Bare Jr.

Bobby Bare Jr. chronology
A Storm A Tree My Mother's Head (2010)	Undefeated (2014)

Undefeated is the fifth studio album by Nashville-based singer-songwriter Bobby Bare Jr. The album was released in 2014, four years after his previous album, and has elements from multiple genres "alternating between indie rock, dream pop, bluegrass and country".

== Reception ==
Professional ratings
Aggregate scores
Source	Rating
Metacritic	81/100
Review scores
Source	Rating
AbsolutePunk	9/10
AllMusic	4/5 stars
American Songwriter	3/5 stars
Blurt	4/5 stars
Exclaim!	7/10
Mother Jones	favorable

Undefeated was met with highly positive reviews by critics. Multiple sources noted Bare's diverse and unique style on Undefeated and his previous albums, despite his father Bobby Bare having multiple country music hits, with Exclaim! writer Matthew McKean saying that Bare "wasn't content to hitch a ride with his Country Music Hall of Fame father or the Nashville royalty around whom he grew up". Blurt Magazine writer John Moore gave the album 4 stars stating that "it’s simply confounding that Bare and his band aren’t as big as groups like Arcade Fire and My Morning Jacket". Hal Horowitz from American Songwriter stated that "just when you think you have a sense of Bobby Bare Jr.’s style, he up and changes it", though still thought the record was "occasionally too scattershot".

== Track listing ==
All music and lyrics by Bobby Bare Jr. except where noted.

No.	Title	Lyrics	Music	Length
1.	"North of Alabama by Mornin'"		Bare, Matt Rowland	4:07
2.	"If She Cared"			3:14
3.	"The Big Time"			3:43
4.	"Don't Wanna Know"			4:46
5.	"The Elegant Imposter"		Bare, Rowland	2:11
6.	"Undefeated"			4:50
7.	"My Baby Took My Baby Away"	Bare, Hayes Carll	Bare, Hayes Carll	3:12
8.	"Blame Everybody (But Yourself)"			3:15
9.	"As Forever Became Never Again"			3:51
10.	"Don't Stand at the Stove"			4:23
Total length:				37:32

== Personnel ==
- Bobby Bare Jr – vocals, guitar, songwriting
- Matt Rowland – keyboard
- Doni Schroader – drums
- Jordan Caress – bass
- David Vandervelde – guitar, bass
- Richie Kirkpatrick – guitar, bass
- Michael Grimes – bass
- Van Campbell – drums
- Hayes Carll – songwriting
