= Vagabonds (The Classic Crime album) =

Studio album by the Classic Crime
- Released: April 6, 2010
- Genre: Alternative rock, pop punk, indie rock
- Length: 40:05
- Label: Tooth & Nail
- Producer: Michael "Elvis" Baskette

The Classic Crime chronology
The Silver Cord (2008)	Vagabonds (2010)	Phoenix (2012)

Professional ratings
Review scores
Source	Rating
AbsolutePunk.net	77% link
The Album Project	link
Allmusic	link
Alternative Press	link
Christian Music Zine	A link
Indie Vision Music	link
Jesus Freak Hideout	link
Sputnikmusic	4/5 stars

Vagabonds is the third album from rock band the Classic Crime. The album was released on April 6, 2010. The profits from all pre-orders were donated to the earthquake victims of Haiti. "Solar Powered Life", "Cheap Shots", "Four Chords", "The Count" and "Everything And Nothing" can be listened to on the band's MySpace page. "Solar Powered Life" was the first radio single with an adds date to alternative/modern rock radio of March 29, 2010

== Track listing ==
All lyrics are written by Matt MacDonald, except where noted.

Vagabonds track listing
No.	Title	Writer(s)	Length
1.	"A Perfect Voice"		2:50
2.	"Cheap Shots"	MacDonald, Robert Negrin	3:30
3.	"Solar Powered Life"		2:07
4.	"Four Chords"		3:38
5.	"Vagabonds"		3:43
6.	"The Happy Nihilist"		3:28
7.	"My Name"		4:22
8.	"Everything & Nothing"	Justin DuQue, MacDonald	4:02
9.	"The Count"		3:45
10.	"Different Now"		3:59
11.	"Broken Mess"		4:20
Total length:			40:05

Deluxe edition
No.	Title	Length
12.	"Weapon Of Choice - Demo"	3:10
13.	"Walk With Me"	5:05

=== Singles ===
- "Four Chords"
- "Solar Powered Life"
- "A Perfect Voice"

== Credits ==
- Michael "Elvis" Baskette - producer, mixing
- Dave Holdredge - engineer
- Jef Moll - digital editing

== Personnel ==
- Matt Macdonald - Vocals & Guitar
- Justin DuQue - Guitar
- Robert Negrin - Guitar
- Alan Clark - Bass
- Paul Erickson - Drums
