= Master of Styles =

1998 studio album by The Urge

Studio album by The Urge
- Released: April 21, 1998
- Recorded: 1998 at Sierra Sonic Studios
- Genre: Alternative rock; ska; reggae; alternative metal
- Length: 42:40
- Label: Immortal
- Producer: GGGarth

The Urge chronology
Receiving the Gift of Flavor (1995)	Master of Styles (1998)	Too Much Stereo (2000)

Professional ratings
Review scores
Source	Rating
AllMusic	4/5 stars
MusicHound Rock: The Essential Album Guide	3.5/5 stars

Master of Styles is a studio album by alternative rock band The Urge, released in 1998. The album produced three singles (“Jump Right In”, “Straight to Hell”, and “Closer”) and sold 250,000 copies. “Jump Right In” featured guest vocals by Nick Hexum of 311 and hit the #10 position on the Modern Rock list.

== Critical reception ==
The Washington Post wrote that "Urge seems to have a chameleonic talent for adapting to punk, ska, reggae, hip-hop and reggae trends without ever distinguishing itself." MTV wrote that "any group that can throw funk, ska, pop and metal into the old mixmaster (accent on old) without any discernible recipe for making it all work to their commercial benefit is nothing if not adaptable." CMJ New Music Monthly opined that the band "combines sounds from funk to punk to reggae, and it's successful thanks in large part to the one constant: the mellifluous, adaptable voice of Steve Ewing."

== Track listing ==
All tracks are written by Steve Ewing, Karl Grable, Jerry Jost, Todd Painter, and John Pessoni, except where noted.

No.	Title	Writer(s)	Length
1.	"If I Were You"		3:52
2.	"Straight to Hell"		3:15
3.	"Jump Right In" (ft. Nick Hexum)	The Urge, N. Hexum	3:43
4.	"S.L.O.B."	S. Ewing, K. Grable, J. Pessoni	2:48
5.	"Played Out"		3:39
6.	"Closer"	K. Grable, J. Jost, T. Painter, J. Pessoni	3:49
7.	"Gene Machine" (Bad Brains Cover)	P. Hudson, D. Jenifer	3:03
8.	"My Apology"	S. Ewing, K. Grable, J. Jost, M. Kwiatkowski, T. Painter, J. Pessoni	3:24
9.	"Divide and Conquer"	The Urge	4:43
10.	"Identity Crisis"		2:42
11.	"Going Down"		3:24
12.	"Prayer for Rain"	S. Ewing, K. Grable, J. Jost, M. Kwiatkowski, T. Painter, J. Pessoni	4:15
Total length:			42:40

== Personnel ==
The Urge

- Steve Ewing - vocals
- Karl Grable - bass, concept
- Jerry Jost - guitars
- John Pessoni - drums, background vocals
- Bill Reiter - saxophone
- Matt Kwiatkowski - trombone
- Todd Painter - trombone, keyboard

Additional musicians

- Nick Hexum - vocals in "Jump Right In"

Additional personnel

- Mike Dillon - percussion
- Doug Erb - art direction
- GGGarth - engineer, producer
- Mr. Colson - engineer
- Tom Gordon - assistant engineer
- Steve Hupaylo - unknown contributor
- Michael Lavine - photography
- Bob Ludwig - mastering
- Luke Partridge - design
- Joe Gastwirt- Mastering on Jump right in.
- Randy Staub - mixing
- Joe Varkey - assistant engineer
- Gary Winger - mixing assistant

== Charts ==
Chart (1998)	Peak position
US Billboard Heatseekers	1
US Billboard Billboard 200	111
