= The Longest Meow =

Studio album by Bobby Bare Jr.
- Released: September 26, 2006
- Recorded: March 26, 2006 in Nashville, Tennessee
- Genre: Rock; alternative rock; alternative country; psychedelic rock
- Length: 38:51
- Label: Bloodshot
- Producer: Bobby Bare Jr.; Brad Jones

Bobby Bare Jr. chronology
From the End of Your Leash (2004)	The Longest Meow (2006)	A Storm A Tree My Mother's Head (2010)

The Longest Meow is the third studio album by American singer-songwriter Bobby Bare Jr. The album, released on September 26, 2006, came two years after his previous studio album From the End of Your Leash, and continues Bare's eccentric and experimental style. The 11-track album (Note: The full album has 12 tracks, containing a 25-second intro in addition to the main 11 tracks.) was recorded during one 11-hour session in Nashville on March 26, 2006 with musicians from My Morning Jacket, Lambchop, Trail of Dead, and Clem Snide. The album primarily is a mixture of alternative country and indie rock, though also employs elements from other genres. The reception from critics was generally positive, with reviewers admiring Bare for his unconventional approach to music, though still noting that parts of the album seemed rushed as a result of time constraints.

== Track listing ==
All writing by Bobby Bare Jr. except where noted.

No.	Title	Writer(s)	Length
1.	"Bionic Beginning"		0:25
2.	"The Heart Bionic"		3:17
3.	"Gun Show"		3:31
4.	"Back To Blue"		3:51
5.	"Sticky Chemical"		2:54
6.	"Uh Wuh Oh"		1:58
7.	"Demon Valley"		4:11
8.	"Mayonaise Brain"		3:11
9.	"Snuggling World Championships"	Bare, Carl Broemel, Patrick Hallahan	3:11
10.	"Borrow Your Cape"	Bare, Broemel	5:24
11.	"Where Is My Mind" (Pixies cover)	Black Francis	2:27
12.	"Stop Crying"		4:31
Total length:			38:51

== Personnel ==
- Bobby Bare Jr. – guitar, vocals
- Carl Broemel – guitar, keyboard
- Brad Jones – bass guitar, organ, sound engineering
- Patrick Hallahan – drums
- Doni Schroader – keyboard, percussion, vibraphone
- Jim James – harmonica, vocals
- Cory Younts – keyboard, vocals
- Carey Kotsionis – vocals
- Benny Martin – percussion
- Neal Rosengarden – trumpet
- Deanna Varagona – saxophone, vocals
- Jim DeMain & Leslie Richter – sound engineering
