= What Was Done, Vol. 1: A Decade Revisited =

What Was Done, Vol. 1- A Decade Revisited

Studio album by the Classic Crime
- Released: October 28, 2014
- Recorded: November 2013 – July 2014
- Genre: Acoustic rock, indie rock
- Label: BadChristian Music
- Producer: Matt MacDonald

The Classic Crime chronology
Phoenix (2012)	What Was Done, Vol. 1- A Decade Revisited (2014)

Professional ratings
Review scores
Source	Rating
AllMusic	3/5 stars
Jesus Freak Hideout	4.5/5 stars

What Was Done, Vol. 1: A Decade Revisited is an acoustic album by rock band the Classic Crime released on October 28, 2014 via BadChristian Music. Like their previous effort, Phoenix (2012), the album was funded through the website Kickstarter. Kickstarter backers were able to digitally download the album one week prior to its release date.

A Kickstarter project entitled "Help The Classic Crime Make 'What Was Done: Volume One'" was created on October 15, 2013, with a funding goal of $15,000. The goal was met within the first two days of the project being posted. Crowdfunding process successfully finished on November 13, 2013, with $50,457 pledged.

== Track listing ==
No.	Title	Length
1.	"All the Memories" (revisited)	4:03
2.	"You and Me Both" (revisited)	4:04
3.	"Salt in the Snow" (revisited)	5:28
4.	"We All Look Elsewhere" (revisited)	4:27
5.	"Vagabonds" (revisited)	3:44
6.	"The Coldest Heart" (revisited)	3:34
7.	"My Name" (revisited)	3:45
8.	"Who Needs Air" (acoustic version)	4:05
9.	"Beautiful Darkside" (revisited)	4:42
10.	"God and Drugs" (revisited)	4:26
11.	"Headlights" (acoustic version)	4:59
12.	"The Fight" (acoustic version)	4:18
13.	"Selfish" (bonus track, live in studio)	3:40
14.	"Where Did You Go" (bonus track)	3:50
Total length:		59:05

== Personnel ==
- Matt MacDonald – vocals, guitars
- Robbie Negrin – guitar, group vocals
- Alan Clark – bass, group vocals
- Paul "Skip" Erickson – drums, group vocals
