= Bobby Bare Jr. =

American singer-songwriter (born 1966)

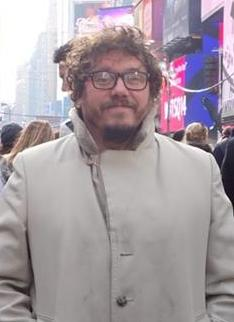
- Bare in NYC (2014)

Background information
- Born: Robert Joseph Bare Jr. June 28, 1966 (age 60); Nashville, Tennessee, United States
- Genres: Americana, alternative country, rock
- Occupation: Musician
- Instruments: Guitar, vocals
- Years active: 1974–present
- Labels: Immortal, Epic, Virgin, Bloodshot, 30 Tigers/Naked Albino
- Website: www.bobbybarejr.com

Robert Joseph Bare Jr. (born June 28, 1966) is an American singer-songwriter and musician.

== Early life ==
Bare was born in Nashville, Tennessee, the son of singer Jeannie Bare (née Sterling) and country musician Bobby Bare, Sr. His parents met in 1963, when his father hired Jeannie, a shopkeeper in Nashville, to join his act as a singer.

Bare has a younger brother, Shannon, and a younger sister, Angela. His older sister Cari Jean (Jeannie's daughter by an earlier marriage) died suddenly at age 15 from complications after surgery.

Bare grew up in Hendersonville, Tennessee, a half an hour northeast of Nashville, where his family lived next door to Tammy Wynette and George Jones.

== Career ==
"[My dad] is three times the singer I am," says Bare Jr. "Once the audience sees him perform, they'll realize I'm only using 10 percent of my genetic potential. I'll be exposed for my slacker attitude."

— Bobby Bare Jr.

In 1974, when Bare was only eight, his father and he were both nominated for a Grammy Award for the song "Daddy What If", written by Shel Silverstein. Bare's daughter Isabella did a version of the song, which was featured on Twistable, Turnable Man, a tribute album to Shel Silverstein, co-produced by Bare and his father. His siblings and he also appeared on the television show Hee Haw when he was a child, to provide the witch scream on Bobby Bare, Sr.'s song "Marie Laveau".

He began playing guitar and songwriting, and started as a professional musician when he was about 30. Bare has said that he is someone who avoided "working a real job at any cost." He worked as a member of the road crew and as a light technician. Once he started writing and performing, he was offered contracts with Immortal Records and Lost Highway.

=== Bare Jr. ===
In the 1990s, he led the roots rock outfit Bare Jr., which was signed to Immortal Records, at that time the home of Korn and Incubus. They released two major label records, 1998's Boo-Tay and 2000's Brainwasher. They had a minor radio hit with "You Blew Me Off," which was featured in the movie Cruel Intentions and its soundtrack. The song was also performed on Late Night with Conan O'Brien on March 3, 1999.

=== Young Criminals Starvation League ===
He has performed with his band, the Young Criminals Starvation League, an ever-changing group of musicians, including members of Lambchop, ...And You Will Know Us by the Trail of Dead, and My Morning Jacket. They have released three studio albums, an EP, and a live album.

=== Solo work ===
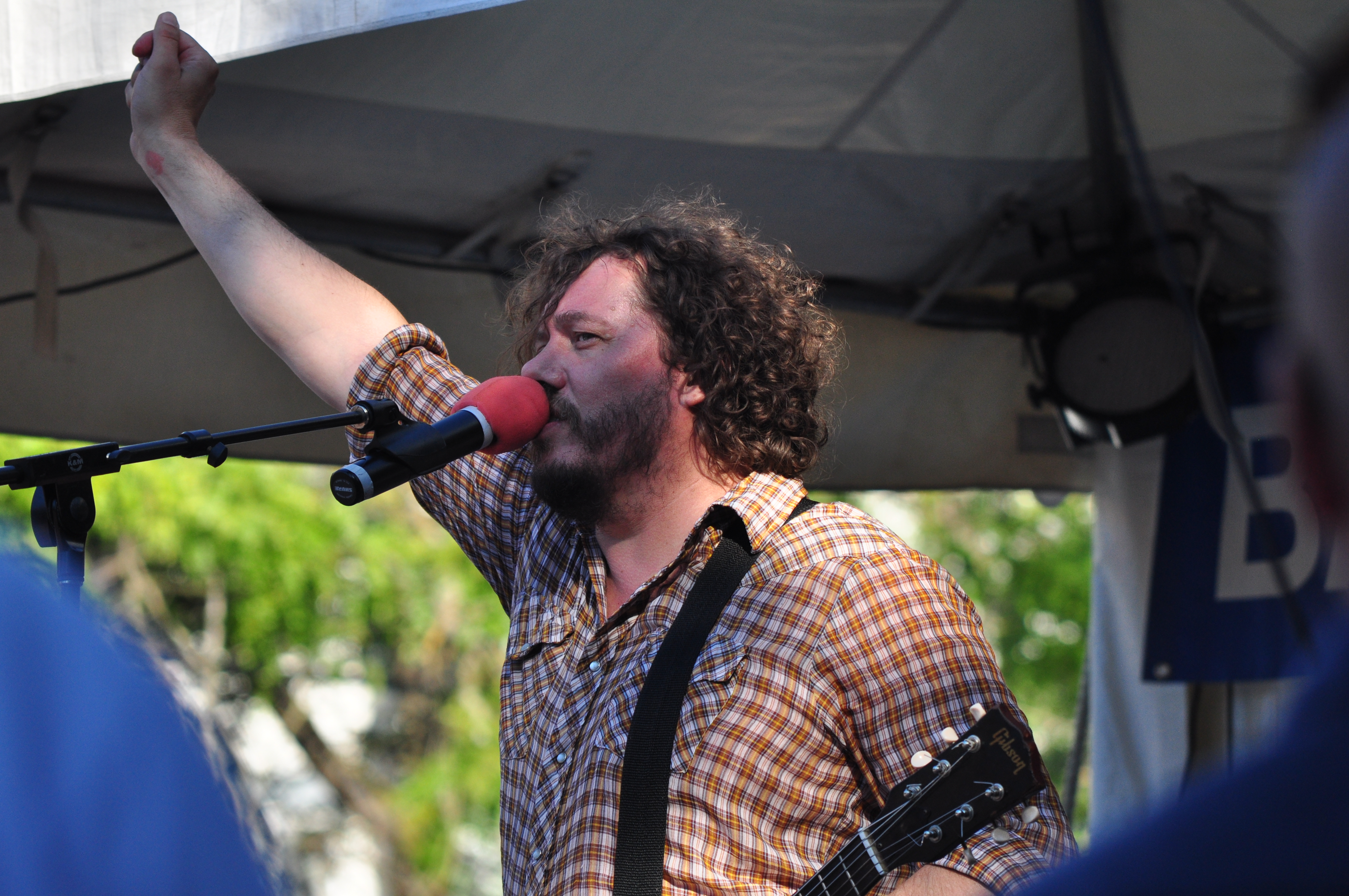
Bobby Bare Jr. Ballard Seafood Fest 2013

His CD, Storm – A Tree – My Mother's Head, was self-released through Bare's licensing company, 30 Tigers/Naked Albino Recordings, in 2010. The title of the record was inspired by a January 2008 storm in Nashville that injured his mother. "Mom was sitting on the couch, the last day of January in 2008, and there was a big, windy storm outside. And a big branch broke off halfway up the tree. It fell on the house, and literally split the house in two and landed exactly on top of her." Another song on the record, "The Sky Is the Ground," is about a bicycle accident his son had when he was two.

Bare regularly performs in house concerts, often accompanied by the vocals of singer Carey Kotsionis.

Shame on Me, a two-song, 7-inch vinyl record was to be released by Big Legal Mess/Fat Possum Records in early 2014.

Spring 2014 had the release of a new record on Bloodshot Records called Undefeated, and was to feature a full band. The first single off the record, "The Big Time," was released as a preview before the official April 15 record launch. Bare recorded the album with Mark Nevers (Lambchop) and Grammy-winning engineer Vance Powell (Jack White, Alicia Keys, the Dixie Chicks, and Buddy Guy).

On the theme of the album, Bare "wrote the album about the end of his relationship with the mother of his youngest child, who is three. The 10 rootsy Americana-style rock songs are at once poignant and shot through with mordant wit, which Bare said is a coping mechanism." Bare opened for Guided By Voices in June 2014.

=== With Guided by Voices ===
In February 2016, Bare joined a new touring lineup of Robert Pollard's band, Guided by Voices, as guitarist along with Doug Gillard also on guitar, bassist Mark Shue, and drummer Kevin March. Bare played guitar on Guided by Voices albums August by Cake (2017), How Do You Spell Heaven (2017), Space Gun (2018), Zeppelin Over China (2019), Warp and Woof (2019), Sweating the Plague (2019), Surrender Your Poppy Fields (2020), Mirrored Aztec (2020), Styles We Paid For (2020), Earth Man Blues (2021), It's Not Them. It Couldn't Be Them. It Is Them! (2021), Crystal Nuns Cathedral (2022), Tremblers And Goggles by Rank (2022), La La Land (2023), and Welshpool Frillies (2023), as well as participating in two releases by a GBV alter-ego, Cub Scout Bowling Pins - Heaven Beats Iowa (2021) and Clang Clang Ho (2021) - as well as several releases by another alter-ego, Cash Rivers and the Sinners - She Laughed I Left (2017), Blue Balls Lincoln (2018), Do Not Try to Adjust Your Set (2018 - featuring a cameo from Bobby Bare, Sr.), Loose Shoes (2019), and Bad Side of the Coin (2020).

== Musical style and influences ==
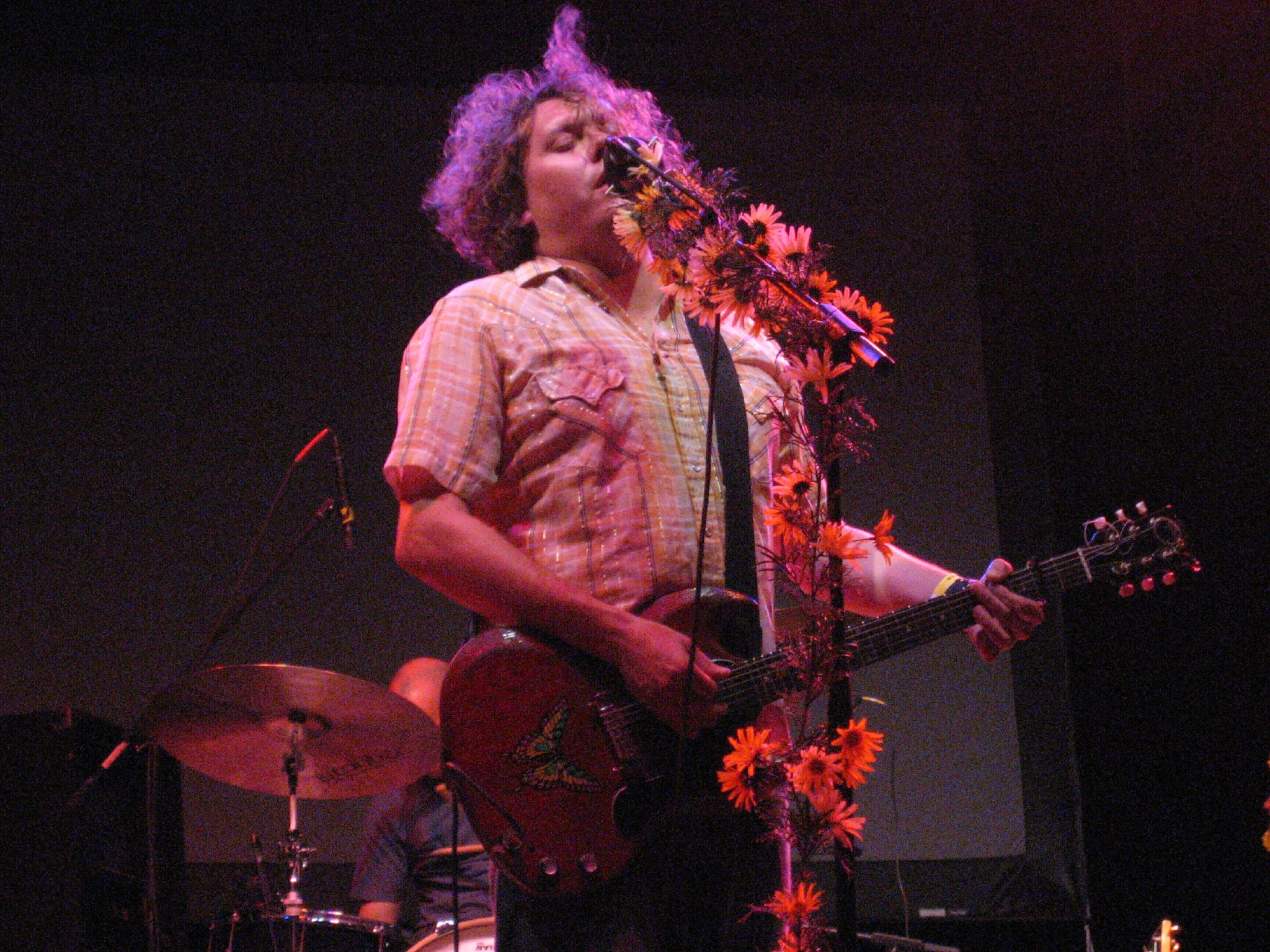
Bobby Bare Jr. Wall of Sound Festival, Ft. Worth, TX September 22, 2007

Many of Bare's songs incorporate humor and references to popular culture. His writing has been characterized as "inventive and melodic". Shel Silverstein was a huge influence in his approach to songwriting. Bare describes it as writing poems and turning them into songs, which was very similar to what Silverstein did.

== Personal life ==
Bare has children Isabella and Beckham from his first wife, and Shelby Booker Bare from his girlfriend.

== Discography ==
=== Studio albums ===
Year	Album
1998	Boo-tay (As Bare Jr.)
2000	Brainwasher (As Bare Jr.)
2002	Young Criminals' Starvation League
2004	From the End of Your Leash
2006	Live: Nick Nacks & Paddy Whacks
2006	The Longest Meow
2010	A Storm, A Tree, My Mother's Head
2014	Undefeated

==== with Guided by Voices ====
2017	August by Cake
2017	How Do You Spell Heaven
2018	Space Gun
2019	Zeppelin Over China
2019	Warp and Woof
2019	Sweating the Plague

=== EPs and singles ===
Year	Album
1974	Daddy, What If With his father Bobby Bare, Sr.
2003	OK – I'm Sorry... (EP)
2009	American Bread (EP)
2010	A Storm, A Tree, My Mother's Head (EP) 5 acoustic demos of the album
2011	UNRELEASED and FREE (EP)
2014	Shame on Me (7" vinyl/digital download) (1,000 limited run)

=== Charted singles ===
Year	Single	Peak chart positions						Album
Year	Single	US Country	US	US Alt.	CAN Country	CAN	CAN AC	Album
1973	"Daddy What If" (with Bobby Bare)	2	41	—	5	53	19	Lullabys, Legends and Lies (Bobby Bare album)
1974	"Where'd I Come From" (with Jeannie Bare)	41	—	—	—	—	—	Singin' in the Kitchen (Bobby Bare album)
1999	"You Blew Me Off"	—	—	40	—	—	—	Boo-tay (Bare Jr. album)

=== Other work ===
- 2000: Down to the Promised Land (compilation) (Bloodshot Records) – "Guitar Playing Woman" by Bare Jr.
- 2004: Sings Greatest Palace Music by Bonnie 'Prince' Billy (Drag City) – vocals on "Riding"
- 2005: Tanglewood Numbers by Silver Jews (Drag City) – vocals on "I'm Getting Back into Getting Back into You"
- 2005: The Moon Was Blue by Bobby Bare (Dualtone) – produced by Bare Jr.
- 2005: For a Decade of Sin: 11 Years of Bloodshot Records (compilation) (Bloodshot Records) – "Ocean Size" by Bobby Bare Jr.
- 2006: Bloodied But Unbowed: The Soundtrack (Bloodshot Records) – "Flat Chested Girl From Maynardville" by Bobby Bare Jr. (live)
- 2006: Bloodied But Unbowed: Bloodshot Records' Life In The Trenches (DVD) (Bloodshot Records) – videos for "Let's Rock and Roll" and "Flat Chested Girl From Maynardville".
- 2010: Twistable, Turnable Man: A Musical Tribute to the Songs of Shel Silverstein (Sugar Hill) – co-produced by Bare Jr. and father, Bare Sr.

== Documentary ==
A documentary that follows Bare's struggles as a touring musician is called Don't Follow Me (I'm Lost): A Film About Bobby Bare, Jr. William Miller, the documentary's director, and Lee Baker, the documentary's producer, joined Bare on the road for four months while touring in support of his 2010 release, A Storm – A Tree – My Mother's Head.

Musicians appearing in the film include My Morning Jacket, Justin Townes Earle, Hayes Carll, David Vandervelde, Blue Giant, Duane Denison, and Bobby Bare, Sr. The documentary was photographed on several formats, including Super 16mm, 16mm, Super 8, and HD and had its East Coast premiere at the CBGB Film Festival in October 2013.
