= From the End of Your Leash =

Studio album by Bobby Bare Jr.
- Released: June 22, 2004
- Genres: Americana; alternative rock; alternative country
- Length: 43:05
- Label: Bloodshot
- Producers: Bobby Bare Jr.; Mark Nevers

Bobby Bare Jr. chronology
Young Criminals' Starvation League (2002)	From the End of Your Leash (2004)	The Longest Meow (2006)

From the End of Your Leash is the second studio album by American singer-songwriter Bobby Bare Jr. The album was released in June 2004, close to 2 years after the release of Bobby Bare Jr.'s previous album, Young Criminals' Starvation League. From the End of Your Leash, like Bare's previous album, was noted for its songwriting and its use of elements from multiple genres, with the Nashville City Paper noting its mix of "traditional country, prototype rock 'n' roll or Americana... plus R&B, punk and even some pop".

Professional ratings
Review scores
Source	Rating
AllMusic	3/5 stars
The Austin Chronicle	3/4 stars
Paste	(favorable)
Uncut	4/5
The Village Voice	A–

== Track listing ==
All writing by Bobby Bare Jr. except where noted.

No.	Title	Writer(s)	Length
1.	"Strange Bird"	Tony Crow, Bobby Bare Jr	2:10
2.	"Valentine"		3:10
3.	"The Terrible Sunrise"		3:07
4.	"Visit Me in Music City"	Bobby Bare Sr, Crow, Bare Jr	4:03
5.	"Your Favourite Hat"	Carey Kotsionis, Bare Jr	3:33
6.	"Don't Follow Me (I'm Lost)"		3:55
7.	"Let's Rock And Roll"		4:06
8.	"Borrow Your Girl"		4:21
9.	"Things I Didn't Say"	Shel Silverstein	2:16
10.	"Your Adorable Beast"		3:20
11.	"Beguiled, Bashful, Burnt"		3:43
12.	"That Mother Fucker" (untitled on CD release)		5:27
Total length:			43:05

== Personnel ==
- Bobby Bare Jr. – guitar, harmonica, vocals, keyboard
- Tony Crow – piano, keyboard
- Doni Schroader – drums, vibraphone
- Matt Swanson & Michael Grimes – bass
- Kami Lyle – trumpet, vocals
- Andrew Bird – violin
- Tracy Hackney – dulcimer
- Paul Niehaus – steel guitar
- Lloyd Barry – trumpet
- Duane Denison, Mark Nevers, & Paul Burch – guitar
- Deanna Varagona, Waldo Weathers, & George Chambers – saxophone
- Amanda Hassell, Mark Nevers, & Jim Demain – sound engineering
