= A Change of Pace =

American pop punk band

- Origin: Peoria, Arizona, U.S.
- Genres: Pop punk, alternative rock, post-hardcore
- Years active: 2001–2011, 2012–2016, 2019–present
- Label: Immortal
- Members: Torry "The Tortoise" Jasper; Jonathan Kelley; Johnny Abdullah; Adam Rodgers; Dan Parker
- Past members: Micah Bentley

A Change of Pace is an American five piece pop punk band from Peoria, Arizona, United States. The band was on both the 2005 and 2006 Warped Tours.

== Biography ==
A Change of Pace formed in 2001 when singer Torry Jasper and drummer Jonathan Kelly began playing together in their freshmen year of high school (while attending Centennial High School). In 2003, after a few years of jamming and playing small local shows, bassist Johnny Abdullah and guitarist Adam Rodgers joined the band. From there they were discovered by manager Jorge Hernandez, and within a few months they were signed to Immortal Records in August 2004, and released their EP Change Is The Only Constant.

In 2005 the band released their first full-length album, An Offer You Can't Refuse, and landed a spot on the Warped Tour. Between October and December 2005, the band embarked on the Myspace Fall Tour across the US. In June 2006, Prepare the Masses was announced, and later released on August 15, 2006. In between this, the band appeared on Warped tour again. The band also added a fifth member to the band, Dan Parker (previously in Don't Let Go). They then went on tour with Roses Are Red. In November 2006, they toured the US with Paulson and InMemory.

In March and April 2007, A Change of Pace went on a tour with Quietdrive, the Classic Crime, Sullivan, and thebleedingalarm. They then supported Paulson on their headlining tour in June 2007. On June 1, 2008 the band announced that they had parted ways with former vocalist Torry Jasper, and announced a new lead singer, Micah Bentley. They also announced the release of their EP, Just No Better Way. With new singer Micah Bentley they have adopted a lighter tone to their music, contrasting drastically with their previous singer Torry Jasper who screamed vocals in their older material.

The band released their third and final album, entitled It Could Be Worse on February 22, 2011.

== Breakup and departure of Micah Bentley ==
On March 13, 2011, drummer Jon Kelley announced via Facebook that after 10 years, A Change of Pace was calling it quits. Their last show, "A Change of Pace Farewell Show", took place on April 22, at The Clubhouse in Tempe. Opening bands included Greeley Estates, Desole, It's Like Love, and In It for Storms.

In April 2011, A Change Of Pace played their final show with singer Micah Bentley as he began to prepare for his solo career.

== Reunion, new album and return of Torry Jasper ==
On Christmas Day 2011, A Change Of Pace was asked to reunite with Torry Jasper and play the ‘South By So What’ festival in Dallas, Texas on March 17 of 2012. After several discussions, the band agreed to perform at the festival with other acts such as The Early November, Motion City Soundtrack, HelloGoodbye and Cartel.

After several meetings, the band decided to work on an album with Torry Jasper. However, this album was never released.

== Prepare The Masses 10th anniversary shows and second breakup ==
In May 2016, the band announced two concerts to celebrate the 10 year anniversary of Prepare The Masses, the first show which took place on July 30, 2016 at The Pressroom in Phoenix, AZ and the second show took place at the Chain Reaction in Anaheim, CA on August 6, 2016. On August 5, the band announced that the show at the Chain Reaction would be their last.

== Second reunion ==
In February 2019, the band posted a cryptic date of June 22 to their social media pages. The band later revealed they would be headlining the first "Pop Punk Nite" at The Van Buren in Phoenix, AZ on June 22.

In April 2025, the band played two shows in Arizona to celebrate the 20th anniversary of An Offer You Can't Refuse. Anarbor opened for both nights and It's like Love joined on the second. In May of the same year, it was announced that An Offer You Can't Refuse and Prepare the Masses would be pressed on vinyl for the first time since their release.

== Post-breakup ==
In 2011, Micah Bentley married Ashley Bentley. Bentley currently lives with his wife in Peoria, Arizona where he continues to write music for his new project. This new project is called "Micah and His Friend".

Jonathan Kelley graduated from medical school at Midwestern University in Glendale, Arizona and is currently completing an emergency medicine residency at Maricopa Medical Center.

Torry Jasper has a new band called "Video Head System".

Dan Parker currently works as a record producer.

Johnny Abdullah married Nicole Castleman in 2017 and has since moved to Wenatcheej, Washington. They welcomed their first son in December 2019.

== Style and influences ==
A Change of Pace's music is drawn from a number of different bands, ranging from pop bands such as the Beatles, to metal bands such Black Sabbath and Led Zeppelin and to the piano pop/rock of artists such as Five for Fighting and Ben Folds. The band however cites their major influence as alternative rock band Third Eye Blind. They have also been noted by AllMusic reviewer Jo-Ann Greene as showing: "the sparkle of U2, the attitude of Green Day, a stinging arena rock-styled lead guitar solo, and a splash of new wave synth, deftly delivered by Dave Holdredge."

AllMusic commented on how all members of the band shared a love for pop punk and Third Eye Blind leading to A Change of Pace's style being described as "explosive, pop-edged alternative rock". Reviews have cited them as showing influence from a variety of rock genres including: pop punk, alternative rock, post-hardcore, screamo, melodic hardcore, pop rock, hard rock, punk rock and indie rock.

== Band members ==
Current

- Torry Jasper – lead vocals (2001–2008, 2012–2016, 2019–present), rhythm guitar (2001-2006)
- Jonathan Kelley – drums (2001–2016, 2019–present)
- Johnny Abdullah – bass, vocals (2001–2016, 2019–present)
- Adam Rodgers – lead guitar (2001–2016, 2019–present)
- Dan Parker – rhythm guitar, vocals (2006–2016, 2019–present)

Former

- Micah Bentley – lead vocals (2008–2011, 2016)

== Discography ==
=== Studio albums ===
- An Offer You Can't Refuse (2005)
- Prepare the Masses (2006) U.S. No. 156
- It Could Be Worse (2011)

=== EPs ===
- Change Is the Only Constant (2003)
- Just No Better Way (2008)
- In This Together (2009)
- The B-Sides (2013)

=== Compilations ===
- Masters of Horror (2005)
- A Santa Cause: It's a Punk Rock Christmas (2006)
- Rockin' Romance (Summer Girls - LFO Cover) (2009)

=== Demos ===
- Connect Set (2000)
