= Galvanized (album) =

Studio album by The Urge
- Released: November 22, 2013
- Genre: Alternative rock; ska
- Length: 53:54
- Label: The Urge, LLC
- Producer: The Urge

The Urge chronology
| Too Much Stereo (2000) | Galvanized (2013) |

Singles from The Urge
- 1. "Say Yeah" Released: August 16, 2011; 2. "Out On the Fringe" Released: October 11, 2013

Galvanized is the seventh studio album by The Urge. It was released on November 22, 2013, through their own label, The Urge, LLC. It is the first studio album since 2000's Too Much Stereo and the first album since their disbandment in December 2001.

== Overview ==
On July 15, 2011, The Urge confirmed that they would be reforming to write new music. Their new single "Say Yeah" debuted immediately following the announcement at Pop's live on the radio. Their first show back together was Pointfest 29. During the live radio interview, the band discussed with Donny Fandango that the new music will be entirely new material, and will not be the abandoned album "Escape From Boys Town" from 2001 (which they currently have no plans of resurrecting).

== Release and promotion ==
To promote the album, the band performed at The Pageant in St. Louis, MO on November 22, 23 and 29, 2013.

== Track listing ==
All tracks are written by The Urge.

| No. | Title | Length |
|---|---|---|
| 1. | "Believe" | 4:03 |
| 2. | "Out On the Fringe" | 3:03 |
| 3. | "Perfect Hazard" | 5:33 |
| 4. | "Hollywood Ending" | 4:15 |
| 5. | "Chupacabra" | 2:53 |
| 6. | "Soul Compromise" | 3:30 |
| 7. | "So We Move" | 4:35 |
| 8. | "Say Yeah" | 3:23 |
| 9. | "Can't Find a Reason" | 3:39 |
| 10. | "It Just So Happens" | 5:45 |
| 11. | "Standing in Line" | 5:43 |
| 12. | "The Breath of the Dragon" | 5:05 |
| 13. | "Galvanized" | 2:08 |
| Total length: | | 53:54 |

== Personnel ==
The Urge

- Steve Ewing - vocals
- Karl Grable - bass
- Jerry Jost - guitars
- John Pessoni - drums
- Bill Reiter - saxophone, keyboards
- Matt Kwiatkowski - trombone

== Charts ==
| Chart (2013) | Peak position |
|---|---|
| US Billboard Top Heatseekers | 49 |
