= Receiving the Gift of Flavor =

Receiving The Gift of Flavor

Studio album by The Urge
- Released: August 15, 1995 (Neat Guy release); August 20, 1996 (Immortal release)
- Recorded: The Studio
- Genre: Alternative rock; ska; reggae; alternative metal; funk metal
- Length: 32:32 (1995 release); 36:10 (1996 release)
- Label: Neat Guy; Immortal
- Producer: The Urge, Michael Vail Blum

The Urge chronology
Fat Babies in the Mix (1993)	Receiving The Gift of Flavor (1995)	Master of Styles (1998)

Professional ratings
Review scores
Source	Rating
AllMusic	2.5/5 stars

Receiving The Gift of Flavor is the fourth studio album by The Urge. It was originally released in 1995 in cassette and CD format under the band's own label Neat Guy Recordings. After the band was signed to Immortal Records, the album was re-released switching out the song "Killing is Easy" for "Take Away" in 1996. The album produced three singles ("Brainless", "All Washed Up" and "It's Gettin' Hectic", a Brand New Heavies cover) and sold 150,000 copies.

To celebrate the 20th anniversary of the album, the band re-recorded the album live before a studio audience at the Ozark Theater in Webster Groves, MO on August 15, 2015. The live re-recording was released on November 20, 2015, and includes similar cover art with a blue background.

== Track listing ==
No.	Title	Writer(s)	Length
1.	"Brainless"	S. Ewing, K. Grable, M. Kwiatkowski, T. Painter, J. Pessoni	2:36
2.	"All Washed Up"	K. Grable, M. Kwiatkowski, T. Painter	3:22
3.	"Where Do We Go"	T. Painter, J.Pessoni	4:10
4.	"Drunk Asshole"		1:54
5.	"Don't Ask Why"	T. Painter	3:02
6.	"Open All Night"	T. Painter	2:37
7.	"Killing is Easy "	The Urge	3:07
8.	"Frying Pan"	S. Ewing, K. Grable, M. Kwiatkowski, T. Painter	2:31
9.	"I Remember"	K. Grable, T. Painter, J. Pessoni	3:03
10.	"Damn That Shit Is Good"	T. Painter	1:45
11.	"It's Gettin' Hectic"	Bartholomew, Elam, Kincaid, Levy	2:38
12.	"Violent Opposition"	T. Painter	4:20
13.	"Dirty Rat"	The Urge	2:09
14.	"Brainless" (Remix, hidden track)		3:09
Total length:			32:32 / 36:10

== Notes ==
1. "Killing Is Easy" was replaced by "Take Away" in the 1996 Immortal Records release.

== Personnel ==
The Urge

- Steve Ewing - vocals
- Karl Grable - bass, art direction, design
- Jerry Jost - guitars
- John Pessoni - drums
- Bill Reiter - saxophone
- Matt Kwiatkowski - trombone
- Todd Painter - trombone, keyboards

Other personnel

- Simon Bartholomew, Keith Elam, Jan Kincaid, Andrew Levy - composers for "It's Gettin' Hectic"
- Jeff Finazzo - design, photography
- Brad Kopplan - engineer, mixing
- Eng Kopplan - mixing
- Ken Paulakovich - engineer, mixing
- Eddy Schreyer - mastering
- Michael Vail Blum - engineer, mixing, producer, remixing
- Lou Whitney - assistant engineer, studio assistant
