= His Boy Elroy =

American alternative rock band

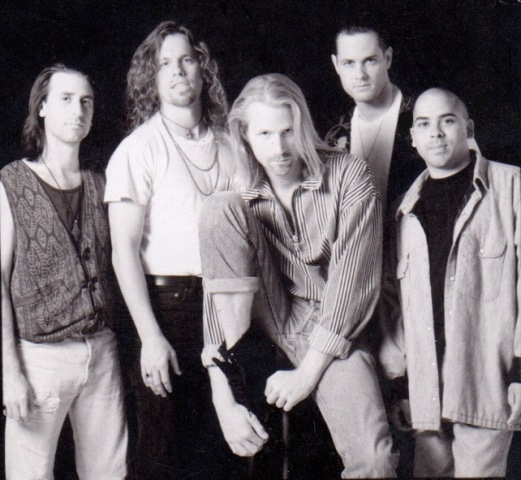
- The original His Boy Elroy band in 1993. Left to right: Mario Rossi, Charlie Longhi, Johnny Fly, Scott Doyle, Forrest Breese

Background information
- Origin: Seattle, Washington
- Genres: Alternative rock, alternative dance, house
- Label: Immortal/Epic
- Website: www.hbemusic.com

His Boy Elroy (HBE) was an American alternative rock band from Seattle, Washington. The band's name is taken from the lyrics to the theme song of the American cartoon The Jetsons, referring to George Jetson's son, Elroy Jetson.

== History ==
The band was founded in January 1992 in Seattle by Johnny Fly (alias of Johnny Stevens). The group's 1993 self-titled Epic Records album was constructed mainly in the studio. Most of the album was recorded at Scotland Yard Studios and produced by Karl Stephenson. Clark Stiles recorded and produced the tracks, "Fade to Black" and "Don't Leave Me". Stiles and Stephenson co-produced the track "Closer to You". Also, with production remix work from Phil Harding and Ian Curnow on the "Chains" remix. Duncan Sheik made an appearance on the record, playing guitar on the song, "Closer to You". The record was similar in sound to groups such as Jesus Jones, EMF, and the Soup Dragons. The lead single from the record, "Chains", was a dance hit, reaching No. 7 on the Billboard Dance Club Play charts and No. 25 on the Maxi Singles charts. The song was also used during a party scene in the film Beethoven's 2nd. The song "Fly" appears almost in full length in the opening scene showing windsurfers on the TV series Baywatch in Episode S04E06, Tentacles.

Johnny Fly moved to Los Angeles and a band was assembled to tour behind the record, which included Forrest Breese on bass, Mario Rossi on drums, Scott Doyle on keyboards and percussion. The band went through four guitarists in that same year. Starting with "a guy named Dave" who did not last long, then with Charlie Longhi on guitar, then another guitarist who only lasted for a radio interview, and then finally Matt Waldrum on guitar. The group first toured the United States in the summer of 1993. All band members are still active musicians and still perform independently. Fly, Breese, Waldrum and another drummer, Adrian Musolf have also written songs as Pumping Ethyl, the alter ego punk band of His Boy Elroy.

== Band members ==
- Johnny Fly (Johnny Stevens) - lead vocals, guitar
- Matt Waldrum - guitar
- Forrest Breese - bass, vocals
- Scott Doyle - keyboards, percussion, vocals
- Mario Rossi - drums

=== Previous members ===
- Charlie Longhi - guitar
- "Dave" - guitar
- "Some Other Guy" - guitar

== Discography ==
=== Albums ===
- His Boy Elroy, CD Album, EK53210 (Immortal/Epic, 1993)

Track listing:

1. "I'm in Love"
2. "Chains"
3. "Fade to Black"
4. "Down That Road"
5. "She's My Spy"
6. "Don't Leave Me"
7. "Closer to You"
8. "Fly"
9. "Free"
10. "Wastin' Time"
11. "Receiving Me"
12. "Chains (Remix)"

=== Singles ===
- "Chains" maxi-single: LP Version and Harding & Curnow Remix Version (Epic, 1993)
- "Fade to Black" maxi-single: Remix Version, Acoustic Version plus "Don't Leave Me": Radio Mix, Radio Remix Instrumental and Alternative Club Mix (Epic, 1993)
