= A Hostage and the Meaning of Life =

Studio album by Brazil
- Released: September 26, 2004
- Recorded: Grandma's Warehouse, Los Angeles, CA
- Genre: Progressive rock, post-hardcore
- Label: Fearless
- Producer: Alex Newport

Brazil chronology
Dasein (2002)	A Hostage and the Meaning of Life (2004)	The Philosophy of Velocity (2006)

Professional ratings
Review scores
Source	Rating
Allmusic	2.5/5 stars

A Hostage and the Meaning of Life is an album by the rock band Brazil.

== Track listing ==
1. "A Hostage" – 2:56
2. "The Novemberist" – 4:47
3. "Io" – 3:34
4. "Escape" – 3:14
5. "We" – 3:03
6. "The Iconoclast" – 5:19
7. "Zentropa" – 3:04
8. "Fall Into" – 4:15
9. "Metropol" – 6:41
10. "Aventine" – 3:45
11. "Form and Function" – 2:12
12. "Fatale and Futique" – 5:14

== Credits ==
Jonathon Newby – Vocals, MOOG, vocoder
Nic Newby – keyboards
Aaron Smith – electric guitar
Eric Johnson – electric guitar
James Sefchek – drums
Benjamin Hunt – bass

With

Alex Newport – producer, engineer, mastering
Matt Miller and J.R. Cary– pre-production
Album Photography – Lisa K. Fett
Sleeve Art – Colin May
