= Brazil (band) =

American rock band

- Origin: Indiana, USA
- Genres: Post-hardcore, alternative rock, progressive rock
- Years active: 2001–2007, 2019, 2025
- Labels: Fearless Records, Immortal Records
- Members: Jonathon Newby; Nic Newby; Aaron Smith; Eric Johnson; James Sefchek; Philip Williams

Brazil is a post-hardcore and progressive rock band from Indiana, USA.

== Band history ==
The band was formed in 2000 by the brothers Jonathon and Nicholas Newby in Muncie, Indiana. In early 2001 the band renamed themselves Brazil, taken from the Terry Gilliam film Brazil. In 2002 the band signed a small contract with Fearless Records who released the Dasein EP. In 2004 they released their debut album A Hostage and the Meaning of Life, also released by Fearless Records. The band later signed with Immortal Records to release The Philosophy of Velocity in 2006. In August 2007, Jonathon Newby left the band, resulting in the band breaking up. Their final show was performed on August 18, 2007.

== Members ==
Final lineup

- Jonathon Newby – Vocals (2001–2007)
- Nic Newby – Keyboards (2001–2007)
- Aaron Smith – Guitars (2002–2007), Bass (2001)
- Eric Johnson – Guitars (2002–2007)
- James Sefchek – Drums (2003–2007)
- Philip Williams – Bass (2004–2007)

Previous members

- Jonny Richardson – Guitars, vocals (2001)
- Jonathan May – Guitars (2001)
- Benjamin Hunt – Bass (2001–2004)
- Matt Miller – Guitars (2002)
- Andrew Gaub – Drums (2001)
- Scott Freeman – Drums (2002)

Touring

- Alex Bond – Live drums (2002)
- Tim Hardy – Live drums (2002)
- Jason Bradley – Live drums (2003)
- James Cole – Live drums (2003)
- Nater Kane – Live drums (2003)
- Brandon Beaver – Live drums (2003)
- Christopher Swinney – Live bass (2004)

== Discography ==
- Brazil (Demo, Self-released, 2000)
- Dasein (EP, Fearless Records, 2002)
- A Hostage and the Meaning of Life (LP, Fearless Records, 2004)
- The Philosophy of Velocity (LP, Immortal Records, 2006)

Compilation appearances

- Wrapped Around Your Finger (The Police Cover) – Punk Goes 80s Compilation (Fearless Records, 2005)
- Cities Made of Snow – Santa Cause Benefit Compilation (Fearless Records, 2006)
