= Cover Your Tracks (band) =

American metalcore band

- Origin: Georgia, Atlanta, United States
- Genres: Metalcore, alternative metal, alternative rock, post-hardcore
- Years active: 2014–2017
- Label: Epitaph
- Past members: Paul Rose; Omar Magana; Cory Ferris; Brent Guitswite; Ian Marchionda
- Website: http://site.coveryourtracks.com/

Cover Your Tracks was an American metalcore band from Atlanta, Georgia.

== Band members ==
- Paul Rose - lead vocals
- Omar Magana - guitar
- Cory Ferris - bass
- Brent Guitswite - drums
- Ian Marchionda - guitar / backing vocals

== Albums ==
- Fever Dream (2016)

== Singles ==
List of singles, with selected chart positions, showing year released and album name
Title	Year	Peak chart positions	Album
Title	Year	US Main. Rock	Album
"Striking Matches"	2016	36	Fever Dream
"Good Enough"	2017	—	Fever Dream

=== Music videos ===
Year	Song	Director
"Cages"	2016	
"Striking Matches" (Version 1)	2016	
"Striking Matches" (Version 2)	2017	
