= U.S. Crush (album) =

Studio album by U.S. Crush
- Released: April 11, 2000
- Recorded: December 1998, August–December 1999 at Sound City Studios, Van Nuys, California, except track 1, recorded at Conway Studios, Los Angeles, California in April 1999
- Genre: Punk rock
- Length: 48:35
- Label: Immortal Records/Virgin Records

Professional ratings
Review scores
Source	Rating
Allmusic	4/5 stars

U.S. Crush is the sole album by the American punk rock band, U.S. Crush. It was released April 11, 2000, on Immortal Records/Virgin Records.

== Track listing ==
1. "Bleed" (2:43)
2. "Jimmie Crack Rock" (2:56)
3. "Debutante" (2:28)
4. "Loser" (3:12)
5. "Stand Up" (3:24)
6. "Underground" (3:14)
7. "Same Old Story (She's So Pretty)" (2:58)
8. "You Wanna Be a Star" (2:32)
9. "Collision Course" (3:15)
10. "First Time" (3:51)
11. "Everything" (3:01)
12. "Destroy" (2:23)
13. "Out of Control" (3:13)
14. "So I Thought" (9:30)

== Personnel ==
- Denny Lake - vocals
- Hodgie Haynes - guitar
- David Hanson - guitar
- Ky Lambert - bass
- Dennis Wolfe - drums
