= U.S. Crush =

- Origin: Newport Beach, California, United States
- Genres: Punk rock
- Years active: 1997–2003
- Labels: Immortal Records/Virgin Records
- Members: Denny Lake; Hodgie Haynes; Dave Hanson; Ky Lambert; Dennis Wolfe

U.S. Crush was an American California punk band, formed in 1997 after frontman Denny Lake's former project Atomic Boy split up. The band also featured Hodgie Haynes, David Hanson (both on guitar), Ky Lambert (bass) and Dennis Wolfe (drums).

The Hollywood Reporter described them as "a more catchy and melodic brand of punk, blending neo-Sex Pistols riffs with touches of power pop, British Invasion and good old rock 'n' roll".

== Biography ==
It would not be until three years after forming that U.S. Crush saw its first piece of moderate success in its major label debut album, U.S. Crush, which was released in 2000, featuring their radio hit single "Same Old Story (She's So Pretty)", which had received heavy rotation on KROQ. The album was described as "erupting with swelling pop melodies, hot-lava guitar textures and urgent punk attitude", and a "well crafted first effort". To date, this is U.S. Crush's only released album. About a year after its release, the group parted ways with Immortal/Virgin.

After a break in 2001, U.S. Crush headed back into the studio in 2002 for their second album, and recorded several songs including "White Trash Girlfriend", "Enemy" and "Girls With Guitars", and shopped them around to labels but nobody was interested. However, some demos of the songs for the second album can be heard on the now-rare EP 2002 Rock.

U.S. Crush played a few surprise shows in late 2002/early 2003 to attempt again to catch a label's interest but they were unsuccessful. Around 2003, the group announced their official breakup, and afterward, Lake and Haynes resurfaced in a new project called Kickball.

== Band members ==
- Denny Lake - vocals
- Hodgie Haynes - guitar
- David Hanson - guitar
- Ky Lambert - bass
- Dennis Wolfe - drums

== Discography ==
=== Singles ===
- "Same Old Story" (1999)

=== Albums ===
- U.S. Crush (2000) Virgin/Immortal

=== EPs ===
- 2002 Rock (2002) Self-Released
