= The Philosophy of Velocity =

Studio album by Brazil
- Released: October 3, 2006
- Recorded: Tarbox Road Studio, Cassadaga, NY
- Label: Immortal
- Producers: Dave Fridmann and Brazil

The Philosophy of Velocity is a 2006 concept album by the rock band Brazil. Many of the songs on the album are lyrical short stories and vignettes, focusing on themes of isolation, paranoia, anxiety, and the supernatural with an emphasis on absurdity, dark humor, and camp.

== Reception ==
Professional ratings
Review scores
Source	Rating
Allmusic	4.5/5 stars
MammothPress.com	8.5/10

The Philosophy of Velocity has been met with critical acclaim from many national print and online publications. Allmusic called it “a natural extension of all that has come before, yet a giant step forward for the band.” Alternative Press says “even name-dropping…their peers can’t contain or adequately describe what they have crafted for their follow-up to 2004’s A Hostage and the Meaning of Life.”

== Track listing ==
1. "On Safe-Cracking and Rubella" - 1:16
2. "Crime (and the Antique Solution)" - 3:15
3. "You Never Know" - 3:49
4. "The Vapours" - 2:50
5. "Cameo" - 3:21
6. "Candles (Cast Long Shadows)" - 5:09
7. "Au, Revoir, Mr. Mercury" - 6:20
8. "Captain Mainwaring" - 5:50
9. "A Year In Heaven" - 5:12
10. "The Remarkable Cholmondley Chute System" - 0:49
11. "Breathe" - 3:47
12. "Strange Days" - 6:29

== Credits ==
- Jonathon Newby – vocals, keyboards, timpani, chimes, glockenspiel, tambourine
- Nic Newby – keyboards
- Aaron Smith – electric guitar, engineering
- Eric Johnson – electric guitar, acoustic guitar, classical guitar, 12-string guitar
- James Sefchek – drums, timpani, chimes
- Philip Williams – bass

With:

- Dave Fridmann – co-producer, engineer
- Greg Calbi – mastering
- Matt Miller – pre-production
- Brand Smith – pre-production
