= The Urge =

American alternative rock band

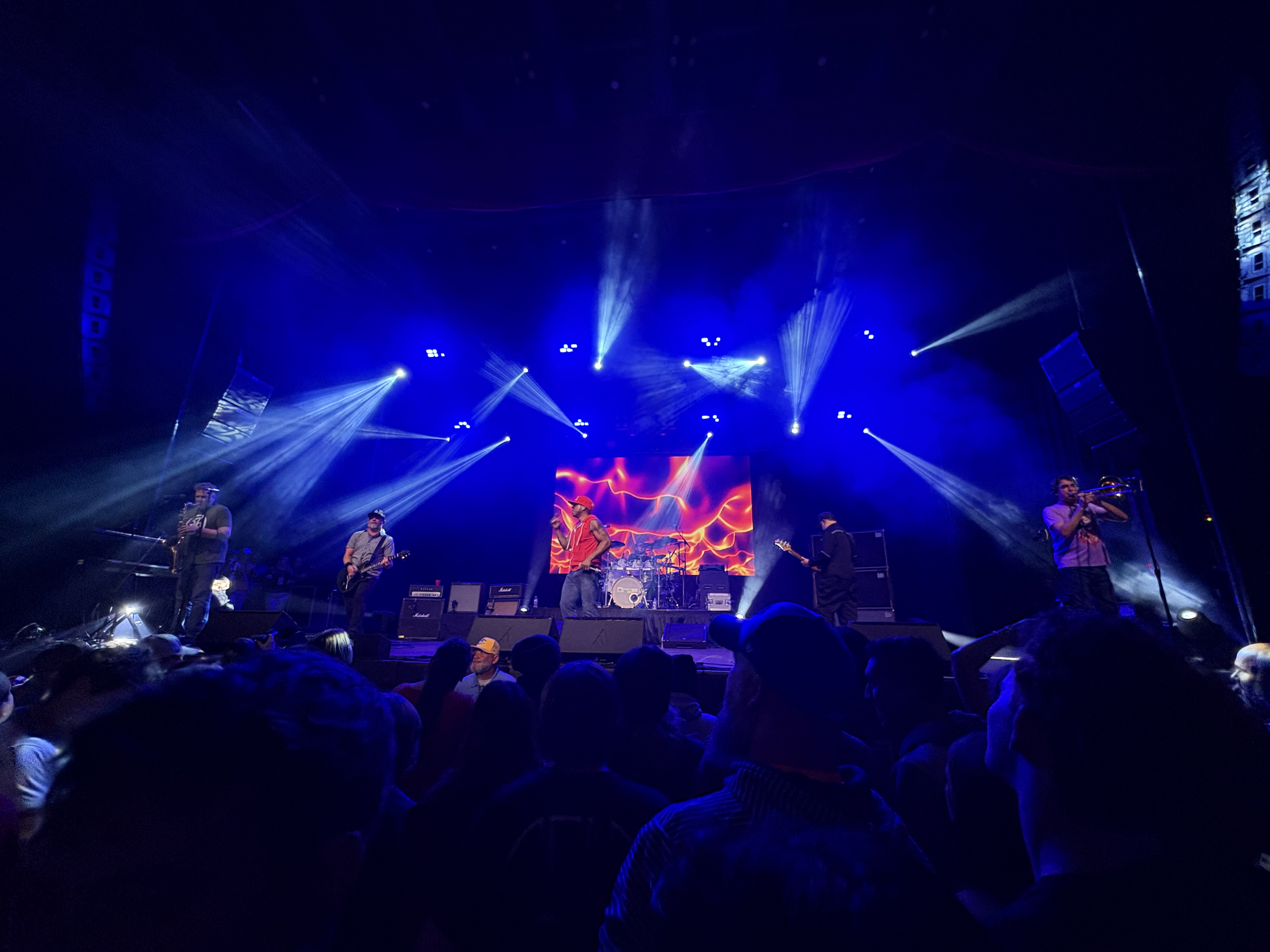
- The Urge in 2025

Background information
- Origin: St. Louis, Missouri, U.S.
- Genres: Alternative rock; reggae; alternative metal; ska; rap rock; funk rock; hardcore punk
- Years active: 1987–2001, 2003–2005, 2011–present
- Label: Epic/Immortal
- Members: Steve Ewing; Karl Grable; Jerry Jost; Matt Kwiatkowski; John Pessoni; Bill Reiter
- Past members: Jeff Herschel; Pat Malecek; Jordan Chalden; Todd Painter; Tony Albano
- Website: theurge.net

The Urge is an alternative rock band based in St. Louis, Missouri. Their music combines several genres, including hardcore punk, heavy metal, ska, reggae, funk, rock, and rhythm and blues. Consistent touring throughout the 1990s earned the band a reputation for high-energy live performances.

== History ==
=== Early career (1987–1994) ===
The Urge was originally formed in 1987 by Webster Groves High School classmates Jeff Herschel (drums) and Karl Grable (bass), and Pat Malecek (guitar) of Saint Louis University High School. The band went through two singers before recruiting Steve Ewing for vocal duties in late 1987. Their first album was released on August 12, 1989, the cassette-only Bust Me Dat Forty, followed a year later by the LP Puttin' the Backbone Back on August 9, which featured the addition of saxophonist Jordan Chalden who joined the band at the end of 1989.

After trombonist Matt Kwiatkowski was recruited in 1992, the group released Magically Delicious, which also featured contributions from trumpeter Tony Albano. Chalden left the band shortly after to deal with substance abuse problems. Later that year, the group added saxophonist/keyboardist Bill Reiter and trombonist/keyboardist Todd Painter. In early 1993, the band released the LP Fat Babies in the Mix, a live concert album recorded at Mississippi Nights in St. Louis.

After Herschel left the band in May 1994 and Malecek left a few months later to pursue other career paths, guitarist Jerry Jost and drummer John Pessoni, both from Christian Brothers College High School, who had previously played together in other bands including Life Without Wayne and The Stand, joined the lineup. Frequent touring with 311 increased the band's fan base.

=== Success and first breakup (1995–2002) ===
In 1995, the band independently released Receiving The Gift of Flavor. Regional radio play of songs "Brainless", "All Washed Up", and "Violent Opposition", as well as successful album sales, brought the band to the attention of Epic's Immortal imprint, which reissued the LP in 1996. The band's music video for "All Washed Up" was used as part of a hidden content for the first issue's second disk of PlayStation Underground in 1997.

After constant touring with the likes of labelmates Korn and Incubus, Master of Styles was released in 1998, containing the hit "Jump Right In" (featuring singer Nick Hexum of 311), as well as the singles "Closer" and "Straight to Hell". "Jump Right In" can be heard in an episode of MTV's Daria and MTV's The Real World, and "Straight to Hell" was featured in the 1998 film Tekken: The Motion Picture. Following the release of Too Much Stereo in mid-2000 and contributing their song "It's My Turn to Fly" to the 2000 animated film Titan A.E., the band toured for nearly a year before calling it quits. In late December 2001, the band went their separate ways due to musical differences.

During their first hiatus, frontman Steve Ewing released several solo records under the name Stevie E. Guitarist Jerry Jost was almost chosen as the replacement guitarist for Limp Bizkit after Wes Borland left the band in 2002. The other members still reside in St. Louis and are involved in several musical projects.

=== Reunions (2003–present) ===
On October 21, 2003, the band announced their reunion with their shows at The Pageant on December 23 and 25. The Urge later on played several reunion shows before they disbanded again in 2005.

On July 15, 2011, The Urge confirmed that they would be reforming to write new music. Their new single "Say Yeah" debuted immediately following the announcement at Pop's live on the radio. Their first show back together was Pointfest 29. During the live radio interview, the band discussed with Donny Fandango that the new music will be entirely new material, and will not be the abandoned album "Escape From Boys Town" from 2001 (which they currently have no plans of resurrecting). The band released their seventh studio album, Galvanized on November 22, 2013. The band performed at The Pageant on November 22, 23, and 29 to promote their album. In July 2015, the band teamed up with PledgeMusic in a fundraising campaign for the 20th anniversary of their album Receiving The Gift of Flavor. To commemorate the album's anniversary, the band re-recorded the songs live at Webster Groves, MO on August 15, 2015. The album was later released on iTunes on November 21, 2015. On September 8, 2017, the band released a brand new single titled "How Does It Feel".

On October 1, 2018, Chris Pinkert reported that the St. Louis Blues had partnered with The Urge to create a new goal song for the team. The song, eventually titled "The Blues Have the Urge", was implemented for the start of the 2018–19 NHL season and was played following each Blues goal at home, immediately after organist Jeremy Boyer played the traditional organ rendition of "When The Blues Go Marching In". For home wins, the song is also played immediately following the final horn (replacing Blur's "Song 2"), followed by an instrumental version as the NHL Three Stars are announced.

Steve Ewing continues to record his own music under the names The Steve Ewing Band, The Steve Ewing Duo, and Master Blaster. Ewing also owns the restaurant Steve's Hot Dogs in the Delmar Loop neighborhood of St. Louis.

== Band members ==
Current members

- Karl Grable - bass (1987–2001, 2003–05, 2011–present)
- Steve Ewing - lead vocals (1987–2001, 2003–05, 2011–present)
- Matt Kwiatkowski - trombone (1992–2001, 2003–05, 2011–present)
- Bill Reiter - saxophone, keyboards, vocals (1992–2001, 2003–05, 2011–present)
- Jerry Jost - guitar (1994–2001, 2003–05, 2011–present)
- John Pessoni - drums, vocals (1994–2001, 2003–05, 2011–present)

Former members

- Jeff Herschel - drums (1987–1994)
- Pat Malecek - guitar (1987–1994)
- Jordan Chalden - saxophone (1989-1992)
- Todd Painter - trombone, keyboards (1992–1999)
- Tony Albano - trumpet (1991-1992)

== Discography ==
=== Studio albums ===
Year	Title	Label	Info	Units Sold	Singles
1989	Bust Me Dat Forty	Neat Guy	-	-	No Official Singles
1990	Puttin' the Backbone Back	Neat Guy	-	-	No Official Singles
1992	Magically Delicious	Neat Guy	-	-	No Official Singles
1995	Receiving the Gift of Flavor	Immortal Records	-	150,000 copies sold	"All Washed Up," "Brainless," "It's Gettin' Hectic"
1998	Master of Styles	Immortal Records	#111 US	250,000 copies sold	"Straight to Hell," "Jump Right In" (#10 US Modern Rock), "Closer"
2000	Too Much Stereo	Immortal Records	#200 US	125,000 copies sold	"Too Much Stereo" (#20 US Modern Rock), "Four Letters and Two Words"
2013	Galvanized	The Urge LLC	#49 Heatseekers	-	"Say Yeah", "Out On The Fringe"

=== Other albums ===
Year	Title	Label	Info	Singles
1993	Fat Babies in the Mix	Neat Guy	Live album - DNC	No Official Singles
2000	Live and Unreleased E.P.	Immortal Records	Live EP - DNC	No Official Singles
2000	Rare and Out of Print	Vintage Vinyl	Compilation - DNC	No Official Singles
2011	"Say Yeah" single	Neat Guy	Single - DNC	"Say Yeah"
2012	All The Way Live	The Urge LLC	Live CD Recorded November 2011 at The Pageant - DNC	No Official Singles
2012	Live and Direct [DVD]	The Urge LLC	Live DVD Recorded November 2011 at The Pageant - DNC	No Official Singles
2015	Receiving The Gift of Flavor - 20th Anniversary	The Urge LLC	Re-Recorded Live Before A Studio Audience	No Official Singles
2017	"How Does It Feel" Single	The Urge LLC	Single - DNC	"How Does It Feel"
2018	The Blues Have the Urge Goal Song (Let's Go Blues)	Not On Label	Official Goal Song of the St. Louis Blues (beginning 2018–19 season)	No Official Singles
