= Albatross (The Classic Crime album) =

Studio album by The Classic Crime
- Released: May 23, 2006
- Recorded: 2006
- Studio: Studio Barbarosa, Bavon, Virginia
- Genre: Indie rock, Christian alternative rock
- Length: 45:19
- Label: Tooth & Nail
- Producer: Michael "Elvis" Baskette

The Classic Crime chronology
We All Look Elsewhere EP (2004)	Albatross (2006)	Seattle Sessions (2007)

Professional ratings
Review scores
Source	Rating
Allmusic	3.5/5 stars
Emotional Punk	7/10 stars
Jesus Freak Hideout	2.5/5 stars

Albatross is the debut studio album by the American rock band The Classic Crime. released in 2006 on Tooth & Nail Records. To date, it has sold over 40,000 copies, and reached No. 12 on the Top Heatseekers.

== Track listing ==
All lyrics are written by The Classic Crime, except where noted.

No.	Title	Length
1.	"The Fight"	3:18
2.	"Flight of Kings"	3:31
3.	"Who Needs Air" (Matt MacDonald)	3:44
4.	"Blisters and Coffee" (MacDonald)	3:21
5.	"The Coldest Heart" (MacDonald)	3:40
6.	"All the Memories"	3:50
7.	"Say the Word"	4:26
8.	"I Know the Feeling"	2:49
9.	"Warrior Poet"	2:54
10.	"The Bitter Uprising"	4:15
11.	"We All Look Elsewhere" (MacDonald)	4:28
12.	"Headlights" (MacDonald)	4:58
Total length:		46:05

== Personnel ==
The Classic Crime

- Matt MacDonald – lead vocals
- Justin DuQue – lead guitar
- Robert Negrin – rhythm guitar
- Alan Clark – bass guitar
- Paul Erickson – Drums

Additional musicians

- Dave Holdredge – Cello

Artwork

- Asterik Studio – Art direction and design
- Jerad Knudsen – band photography

Management

- Jorge Hernandez and Jason Markey – exclusive personal management for Search+Rescue
- Chad Johnson – A&R

Production

- Michael Baskette – producer, mixing
- Dave Holdredge – engineer, mixing
- Tom Lord-Alge – mixing on "The Coldest Heart"
- Jef Moll – Digital editing and programming
- Bernie Grundman – mastering
- Brandon Ebel – executive producer

== Charts ==
Chart (2006)	Peak position
US Top Heatseekers (Billboard)	12
