= The Silver Cord (The Classic Crime album) =

Studio album by the Classic Crime
- Released: July 22, 2008
- Genre: Alternative rock, post-hardcore
- Length: 54:04
- Label: Tooth & Nail
- Producer: Michael "Elvis" Baskette

The Classic Crime chronology
Seattle Sessions (2007)	The Silver Cord (2008)	Vagabonds (2010)

Professional ratings
Review scores
Source	Rating
AbsolutePunk.net	75%/87% link
The Album Project	Link
AllMusic	Link
Alt Press	3/5 stars
Highbeam Review	9/10 stars
Indie Vision Music	10/10 link
Jesus Freak Hideout	link
Melodic.net	3.5/5 stars
StarPulse	3/5 stars
TheBridgeLive.net	Link

The Silver Cord is the Classic Crime's second full-length studio album. It was released on July 22, 2008, on Tooth & Nail Records.

== Background ==
The Classic Crime describes their second album The Silver Cord as their "heaviest, darkest album yet". "Abracadavers", the first single from the album, was released on their MySpace page and on the iTunes Store on June 3, 2008. The single, along with "5805" and "Gravedigging", had previously been performed live. "Gravedigging" can be found on the 2008 Warped Tour CD, and streamed at the band's MySpace page. The full album "The Silver Cord" was eventually posted in the band's MySpace Player.

== Significance of 5805 ==
According to a blog entry posted on the Classic Crime's MySpace page, "5805" is a notably meaningful number for the band. In addition to being the title of the fifth track on the record, it is the address where the Classic Crime first formed and practiced. Multiple members of the band have tattoos of this number, and extraordinarily, The Silver Cord sold exactly 5,805 copies in its first week. This amazed the band enough for them to dedicate a full explanation of the symbolism of this number in a blog entry. "The number is of crazy significance," Matt MacDonald said in the blog. "And I can't tell you how BLOWN AWAY we all were to get our sound scan report today!"

== Track listing ==
All lyrics are written by Matt MacDonald, except where noted.

The Silver Cord track listing
No.	Title	Writer(s)	Length
1.	"The End"		1:47
2.	"Just a Man"		2:56
3.	"Gravedigging"	Robbie Negrin, Paul Erickson, MacDonald	3:45
4.	"The Way That You Are"		3:33
5.	"5805"	Justin DuQue, MacDonald	3:39
6.	"Salt in the Snow"	DuQue, MacDonald	5:34
7.	"Abracadavers"	DuQue, Erickson, MacDonald, Negrin	3:46
8.	"R & R"		3:48
9.	"God & Drugs"		4:15
10.	"Medisin"	DuQue, Erickson, MacDonald	3:55
11.	"The Ascent"	Alan Clark, DuQue, Erickson, MacDonald	1:54
12.	"Sing"		3:00
13.	"Everything"	MacDonald, Negrin	3:34
14.	"Closer Than We Think"		4:07
15.	"The Beginning (A Simple Seed)"		5:02
Total length:			54:04

== Personnel ==
The Classic Crime

- Alan Clark – bass guitar
- Justin DuQue – guitar
- Paul Erickson – drums
- Matt MacDonald – vocals
- Robbie Negrin – guitar

Additional personnel

- Michael "Elvis" Baskette – production, mixing
- Dave Holdredge – engineering
- Jef Moll – digital editing

== Charts ==
Chart performance for The Silver Cord
Chart (2008)	Peak position
US Billboard 200	123
US Christian Albums (Billboard)	3
