= Tyler Read (band) =

- Origin: Shreveport, Louisiana
- Genres: Southern rock, indie rock
- Years active: 2003–2010
- Labels: Immortal Records
- Members: Josh Johnson; Jordan Johnson; Brandon "Nacho" Johnson; Chris Rimmer; Brent Skinner
- Past members: Chris McPeters; Jeb Whitley
- Website: www.Tylerread.com

Tyler Read is a Southern rock band from Shreveport, Louisiana. They were signed to Immortal Records. They have opened shows and tours for Fall Out Boy, Chevelle, Shinedown, Lit, Rev Theory, Saving Abel, Showbread, Pillar, Puddle of Mudd, The Academy Is..., Gym Class Heroes, and The Working Title, as well as Since October and The Butterfly Effect.

Band members cited The Rolling Stones as a significant influence.

The band started with cousins Brandon Johnson and Josh Johnson jamming together in a small shed in their grandmother's yard as teenagers. With Josh on vocals/lead guitar, his baby brother Jordan on drums, and Brandon on bass, the beginning of a wonderful thing started. The band would be named after Brandon, Josh, and Jordan's other baby cousin (not in the band), Tyler Reed. Trying to find websites, amongst other things, the boys realized the name "Tyler Reed" with two ee's was already taken, hence why they now spell it READ. Soon after the band was formed, they were joined by friend Jeb Whitley, who would provide vocals for a year or more at shows and on some songs never officially released to the public, and on their first professionally produced CD, Angel and Demons.

Tyler Read had two of their songs featured on the soundtrack for the independent horror film The School in the Woods (2010). The film's theme songs was written and performed by Tyler Read's Chris Rimmer.

== Discography ==
- Angels And Devils 2003
- Ghosts By Comparison 2004
- The Light, The Glass, The Transparency 2005
- Only Rock And Roll Can Save Us Now 2007
- Hallelujiaville 2009
