= Immortal Records =

American record label

- Founded: 1990
- Founder: Happy Walters; Amanda Scheer Demme
- Defunct: 2007
- Status: Defunct
- Distributors: Epic (1991–1999); Virgin (1999–2002); RED (2003–2007)
- Genre: Punk rock; alternative rock; alternative metal; hip hop
- Country of origin: United States
- Location: Los Angeles, California

Immortal Records was an American independent record label/imprint label based in Los Angeles, California. The company helped launch the careers of such influential acts as Korn, Thirty Seconds To Mars, and Incubus over the years. The label had also released soundtracks, including Judgment Night, Spawn, Blade II and Masters of Horror. It was distributed by various labels, including Epic, Virgin and RED Distribution.

== History ==
Immortal Records was founded in 1991 by Amanda Scheer Demme and Happy Walters. Shortly after its inception, the label signed a three-year deal with Epic Records. The label also renewed its contract with the label in 1994 for two years further.

In 1997, following the expiration of their two-year renewal Epic re-signed a new five-year deal with the label worth $35 million. The deal granted the label more creative freedoms, and around this time the label grew its staff from 15 to 20 employees. However, in 1998 the head of Epic, Richard Griffiths, was fired from his position, and relations between Epic and Immortal began to sour. They eventually agreed to separate, with Epic retaining the rights to Korn and Incubus.

In September 1999, Immortal signed a five-year deal with Virgin Records. Virgin's deal with the label was intended to help the label gain new rock acts. The first signing under the new deal was punk rock band U.S. Crush. The deal was severed in late 2002 after the exits of the executives who signed the label's 1999 distribution deal. Virgin kept Thirty Seconds To Mars on the label.

In August 2003, Immortal signed a deal with RED Distribution.

The company ceased operations in November 2007. Despite this, its name was still used on albums by Incubus and Thirty Seconds To Mars after the label's closure. The Escape Frame's self-titled album, which was intended to be released on Immortal prior to it going defunct, was released through End Sounds in September 2008.

== Discography ==
Distributor	Year	Release date	Artist / Band	Album	Billboard 200 position	RIAA certifications
Epic	1993	May 4, 1993	Funkdoobiest	Which Doobie U B?	#56	
Epic	1993	September 14, 1993	Various Artists	Judgment Night soundtrack	#17	US: Gold
Epic	1993	July 13, 1993	His Boy Elroy	His Boy Elroy	—	
Epic	1994	July 12, 1994	April's Motel Room	Black 14	—	
RCA	1994	April 26, 1994	Volume 10	Hip-Hopera	—	
Epic	1994	October 4, 1994	Various Artists	Love and a .45 soundtrack	—	
Epic	1994	October 11, 1994	Korn	Korn	#72	US: 2× Platinum
Epic	1994	November 15, 1994	Various Artists	B-Ball's Best Kept Secret	—	
Epic	1995	July 4, 1995	Funkdoobiest	Brothas Doobie	#115	
Epic	1995	October 31, 1995	Various Artists	The Next Chapter: Strictly Underground	—	
Epic	1996	April 3, 1996	Far	Tin Cans With Strings To You	—	
Epic	1996	August 20, 1996	The Urge	Receiving The Gift of Flavour	—	
Epic	1996	October 15, 1996	Korn	Life Is Peachy	#3	US: 2× Platinum
Epic	1997	January 7, 1997	Incubus	Enjoy Incubus (EP)	—	
Epic	1997	July 29, 1997	Various Artists	Spawn: The Album	#7	US: Gold
Epic	1997	September 9, 1997	Incubus	S.C.I.E.N.C.E.	—	US: Gold
Epic	1998	March 10, 1998	Far	Water & Solutions	—	
Epic	1998	April 21, 1998	The Urge	Master of Styles	#111	
Epic	1998	August 18, 1998	Korn	Follow The Leader	#1	US: 5× Platinum
Epic	1998	September 8, 1998	Bare Jr.	Boo-Tay	—	
Epic	1998	October 13, 1998	Various Artists	Slam: The Soundtrack	#84	
Epic	1998	October 13, 1998	Goodness	Anthem	—	
Epic	1999	March 30, 1999	Various Artists	Family Values Tour '98	#7	US: Gold
Epic	1999	October 26, 1999	Incubus	Make Yourself	#47	US: 2× Platinum
Epic	1999	November 16, 1999	Korn	Issues	#1	US: 3× Platinum
Virgin	2000	July 18, 2000	The Urge	Too Much Stereo	#200	
Virgin	2000	October 10, 2000	Bare Jr.	Brainwasher	—	
Virgin	2000	November 7, 2000	Snot	Strait Up	#56	
Virgin	2001	April 11, 2001	U.S. Crush	U.S. Crush	—	
Virgin	2001	July 3, 2001	Various Artists	Kiss of the Dragon soundtrack	—	
Virgin	2001	August 14, 2001	No One	No One	—	
Epic	2001	October 23, 2001	Incubus	Morning View	#2	US: 2× Platinum
Virgin	2001	November 9, 2001	Transmatic	Transmatic	—	
Virgin	2002	February 26, 2002	Switched	Subject To Change	—	
Virgin	2002	March 19, 2002	Various Artists	Blade II soundtrack	#26	
Epic	2002	June 11, 2002	Korn	Untouchables	#2	US: Platinum
Virgin	2002	August 27, 2002	Thirty Seconds to Mars	30 Seconds to Mars	#107	
RED	2003	May 20, 2003	7th Standard	Fire From the Sky	—	
RED	2003	November 11, 2003	Various Artists	A Santa Cause: It's a Punk; Rock Christmas	—	
Epic	2003	November 21, 2003	Korn	Take A Look In The Mirror	#9	US: Platinum
Epic	2004	February 3, 2004	Incubus	A Crow Left of the Murder...	#2	US: Platinum
Epic	2004	October 5, 2004	Korn	Greatest Hits Vol. 1	#4	US: Platinum
RED	2004	October 19, 2004	Mix Master Mike	Bangzilla	—	
RED	2005	February 8, 2005	Scary Kids Scaring Kids	After Dark (EP)	—	
RED	2005	March 22, 2005	A Change of Pace	An Offer You Can't Refuse	—	
RED	2005	June 28, 2005	Scary Kids Scaring Kids	The City Sleeps in Flames	—	
Virgin	2005	August 30, 2005	Thirty Seconds to Mars	A Beautiful Lie	#36	US: Platinum
RED	2005	October 18, 2005	Various Artists	Masters of Horror soundtrack	—	
Epic	2006	May 9, 2006	Korn	Live & Rare	—	
RED	2006	June 13, 2006	Waking Ashland	Telescopes (EP)	—	
RED	2006	June 13, 2006	thebleedingalarm	Beauty In Destruction	—	
RED	2006	June 20, 2006	Agent Sparks	Red Rover	—	
RED	2006	July 11, 2006	The Finals	Plan Your Getaway	—	
RED	2006	August 15, 2006	A Change Of Pace	Prepare The Masses	#155	
RED	2006	August 22, 2006	Deadsy	Phantasmagore	#176	
RED	2006	October 3, 2006	Brazil	The Philosophy of Velocity	—	
Epic	2006	November 24, 2006	Incubus	Light Grenades	#1	US: Gold
RED	2006	December 5, 2006	Various Artists	A Santa Cause: It's a Punk; Rock Christmas Volume 2	—	
RED	2007	March 20, 2007	Hot Rod Circuit	The Underground Is a Dying Breed	—	
RED	2007	April 3, 2007	Tyler Read	Only Rock and Roll Can Save Us Now	—	
RED	2007	April 17, 2007	Waking Ashland	The Well	—	
RED	2007	August 21, 2007	Adema	Kill the Headlights	—	
RED/RCA	2007	August 28, 2007	Scary Kids Scaring Kids	Scary Kids Scaring Kids	#80	
Epic	2009	June 16, 2009	Incubus	Monuments and Melodies	#5	US: Gold
Virgin	2009	December 8, 2009	Thirty Seconds To Mars	This Is War	#19	US: Gold
Epic	2011	July 12, 2011	Incubus	If Not Now, When?	#2	
Virgin	2013	May 17, 2013	Thirty Seconds To Mars	Love, Lust, Faith and Dreams	#6	
"—" denotes a recording that did not chart or was not released in that territory.

== See also ==
- List of record labels: I–Q
- Immortal Records albums
