= Incubus discography =

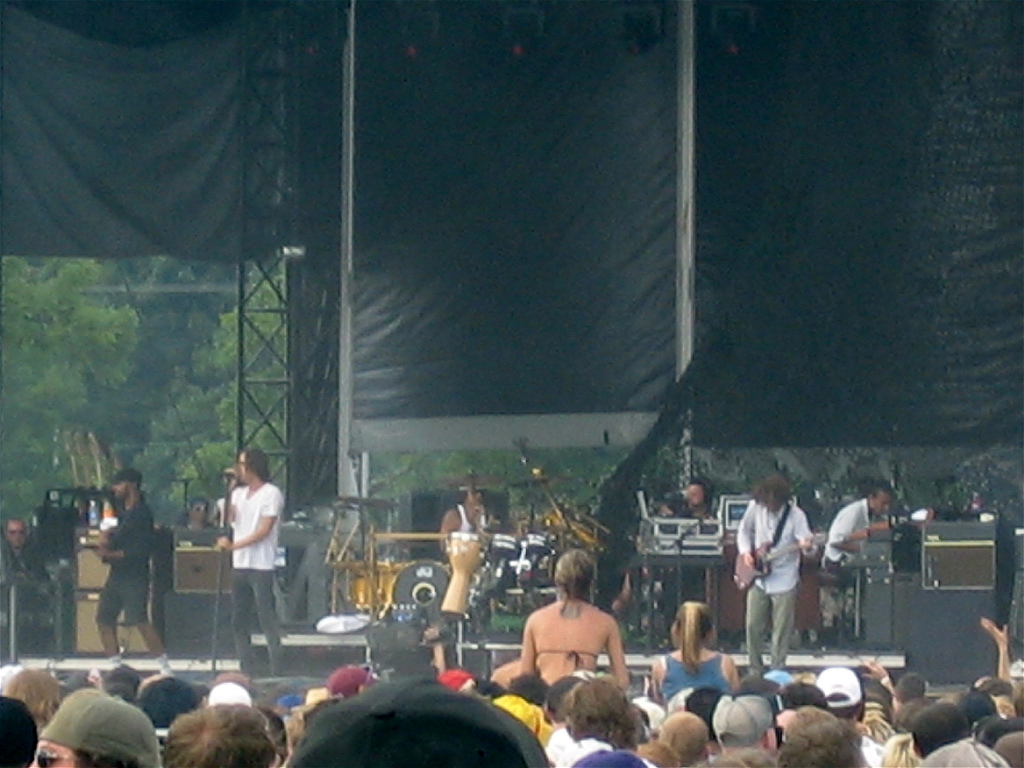
- Incubus in Baltimore in 2007.
- Studio albums: 8
- Extended plays: 5
- Live albums: 4
- Compilation albums: 2
- Singles: 26
- Video albums: 4
- Music videos: 26

This is a comprehensive discography of official recordings by Incubus, an American rock band from Calabasas, California. As of October 2022, Incubus has generated 12.4 million U.S. album consumption units and sold over 23 million records worldwide.

In 2023, the band reworked and re-recorded their 2001 album Morning View, the result titled Morning View XXIII. This was the first release to include new bassist Nicole Row.

== Albums ==
=== Studio albums ===
Title	Album details	Peak chart positions										Certifications
Title	Album details	US	AUS	AUT	CAN	GER	IRL	NLD	NZ	SWI	UK	Certifications
Fungus Amongus	Released: November 1, 1995; Label: Stopuglynailfungus Music on Chillum; Formats: CD, CS	116	—	—	—	—	—	—	—	—	—	
S.C.I.E.N.C.E.	Released: September 9, 1997; Label: Epic/Immortal; Formats: CD, CS, DL, LP	—	—	—	—	—	—	—	—	—	103	RIAA: Gold; BPI: Gold
Make Yourself	Released: October 26, 1999; Label: Epic/Immortal; Formats: CD, CS, DL, LP	47	24	30	—	56	—	—	8	45	83	RIAA: 2× Platinum; ARIA: Gold; BPI: Gold; MC: Platinum; RMNZ: Platinum
Morning View	Released: October 23, 2001; Label: Epic/Immortal; Formats: CD, CS, LP, DL	2	3	38	3	27	56	57	8	59	15	RIAA: 2× Platinum; ARIA: Platinum; BPI: Gold; RMNZ: 2× Platinum
A Crow Left of the Murder...	Released: February 3, 2004; Label: Epic/Immortal; Formats: CD, LP, DL	2	2	8	1	2	14	14	1	10	6	RIAA: Platinum; BPI: Gold; RMNZ: Platinum
Light Grenades	Released: November 28, 2006; Label: Epic/Immortal; Formats: CD, DI, DL, LP	1	15	16	17	19	79	82	6	23	52	RIAA: Gold; BPI: Silver; MC: Gold; RMNZ: Gold
If Not Now, When?	Released: July 12, 2011; Label: Epic/Immortal; Formats: CD, LP, DL	2	10	9	11	5	84	51	5	9	20	
8	Released: April 21, 2017; Label: Island; Formats: CD, LP, DL	4	20	13	15	20	—	97	— (Note: 8 did not enter the NZ Top 40 Albums Chart, but peaked at number three on the NZ Heatseeker Albums Chart.)	20	35	
"—" denotes a release that did not chart.

=== Compilation albums ===
Title	Album details	Peak chart positions										Certifications
Title	Album details	US	AUS	AUT	CAN	GER	IRL	ITA	NZ	SWI	UK	Certifications
Monuments and Melodies	Released: June 16, 2009; Label: Epic/Immortal; Formats: CD, LP, DL	5	20	24	20	35	96	76	3	22	104	BPI: Silver
The Essential Incubus	Released: October 30, 2012; Label: Epic/Legacy; Formats: CD, DL	—	—	—	—	—	—	—	—	—	—	BPI: Silver
"—" denotes a release that did not chart.

=== Live albums ===
Title	Album details	Peak chart positions				
Title	Album details	US	US Current Sales	BEL (FL)	GER	UK Rock
Live at Lollapalooza 2003	Released: October 7, 2003; Formats: CD	—		—	—	—
Live in Japan 2004	Released: June 1, 2004; Formats: CD	—		—	—	—
Live in Sweden 2004	Released: July 13, 2004; Formats: CD	—		—	—	—
Live in Malaysia 2004	Released: August 10, 2004; Formats: CD	—		—	—	—
HQ Live	Released: July 2012; Formats: CD, LP, DL	100	84	199	100	24
"—" denotes a release that did not chart.

=== Video albums ===
Title	Album details	Peak chart positions			Certifications
Title	Album details	US Music Video	UK Blu-Ray	UK Music Video	Certifications
When Incubus Attacks Volume 2	Released: December 11, 2001; Formats: DVD	4	—	4	RIAA: Gold
The Morning View Sessions	Released: May 28, 2002; Format: DVD	1	—	8	RIAA: Platinum
A Crow Left of the Murder...	Released: 2004; Format: DVD	—	—	—	ARIA: Gold
Alive at Red Rocks	Released: November 23, 2004; Format: DVD	7	48	25	RIAA: Platinum; ARIA: Platinum
Look Alive	Released: November 27, 2007; Format: DVD	9	—	—	
"—" denotes a release that did not chart.

== EPs ==
Title	EP details	Peak chart positions					
Title	EP details	US	US Sales	US Alt.	US Rock	UK Phys.	UK Rock
Let Me Tell Ya 'Bout Root Beer	Released: 1995; Label: Baked Goods/Yummy Treats; Formats: Vinyl EP	—		—	—	—	—
Enjoy Incubus	Released: January 7, 1997; Label: Epic/Immortal; Formats: CD, DL	—		—	—	—	—
When Incubus Attacks Volume 1	Released: August 22, 2000; Label: Epic/Immortal; Formats: CD, DL	41		—	—	—	—
Friends and Lovers	Released: February 14, 2012; Label: Epic/Immortal; Formats: DL	—		—	—	—	—
Trust Fall (Side A)	Released: May 12, 2015; Label: Island; Formats: CD, DL	6	3	2	2	—	—
Trust Fall (Side B)	Released: April 17, 2020; Label: Island; Formats: DL	—	11	16	37	3	33
"—" denotes a release that did not chart.

== Singles ==
Title	Year	Peak chart positions										Certifications	Album
Title	Year	US	US Alt.	AUS	AUT	CAN	GER	ITA	NLD	NZ	UK	Certifications	Album
"Familiar" (with DJ Greyboy)	1997	—	—	—	—	—	—	—	—	—	—		Spawn soundtrack
"A Certain Shade of Green"	1997	—	—	—	—	—	—	—	—	—	—		S.C.I.E.N.C.E.
"New Skin"	1998	—	—	—	—	—	—	—	—	—	—		S.C.I.E.N.C.E.
"Pardon Me"	1999	— (Note: "Pardon Me" did not enter the Billboard Hot 100, but peaked at number 2 on the Bubbling Under Hot 100 Singles chart, which acts as a 25-song extension to the Hot 100.)	3	—	—	—	—	—	—	—	61	RMNZ: Platinum	Make Yourself
"Stellar"	2000	— (Note: "Stellar" did not enter the Billboard Hot 100, but peaked at number 7 on the Bubbling Under Hot 100 Singles chart, which acts as a 25-song extension to the Hot 100.)	2	—	—	—	—	—	—	—	—		Make Yourself
"Drive"	2000	9	1	34	—	5	80	—	—	13	40	ARIA: Gold; BPI: Gold; RMNZ: 5× Platinum	Make Yourself
"Wish You Were Here"	2001	60	2	39	—	33	—	34	—	45	27	BPI: Silver; RMNZ: Platinum	Morning View
"Nice to Know You"	2002	— (Note: "Nice to Know You" did not enter the Billboard Hot 100, but peaked at number 5 on the Bubbling Under Hot 100 Singles chart, which acts as a 25-song extension to the Hot 100.)	9	59	—	—	—	—	—	—	—		Morning View
"Warning"	2002	— (Note: "Warning" did not enter the Billboard Hot 100, but peaked at number 4 on the Bubbling Under Hot 100 Singles chart, which acts as a 25-song extension to the Hot 100.)	3	—	—	—	—	—	—	—	—		Morning View
"Are You In?"	2002	—	—	38	—	—	72	37	86	5	34	RMNZ: Gold	Morning View
"Megalomaniac"	2003	55	1	36	—	36	70	21	98	30	23		A Crow Left of the Murder...
"Talk Shows on Mute"	2004	— (Note: "Talk Shows on Mute" did not enter the Billboard Hot 100, but peaked at number 16 on the Bubbling Under Hot 100 Singles chart, which acts as a 25-song extension to the Hot 100.)	3	—	—	—	—	—	42	24	43		A Crow Left of the Murder...
"Make a Move"	2005	—	17	—	—	—	—	—	—	—	—		Stealth soundtrack
"Anna Molly"	2006	66	1	—	—	94	—	—	—	—	109		Light Grenades
"Dig"	2007	94	4	—	55	72	71	—	—	—	—	RMNZ: Gold	Light Grenades
"Oil and Water"	2007	—	8	—	—	—	—	—	—	—	—		Light Grenades
"Love Hurts"	2008	— (Note: "Love Hurts" did not enter the Billboard Hot 100, but peaked at number 13 on the Bubbling Under Hot 100 Singles chart, which acts as a 25-song extension to the Hot 100.)	1	—	12	—	29	—	— (Note: "Love Hurts" did not enter the Netherlands Singles Chart but peaked on the Dutch Tipparade Chart at number 10.)	—	—		Light Grenades
"Black Heart Inertia"	2009	—	7	—	—	—	—	—	—	—	—		Monuments and Melodies
"Let's Go Crazy"	2009	—	—	—	—	—	—	—	—	—	—		Monuments and Melodies
"Adolescents"	2011	— (Note: "Adolescents" did not enter the Billboard Hot 100, but peaked at number 1 on the Bubbling Under Hot 100 Singles chart, which acts as a 25-song extension to the Hot 100.)	3	—	—	—	—	—	—	—	—		If Not Now, When?
"Promises, Promises"	2011	—	13	—	48	—	—	—	—	—	—		If Not Now, When?
"Absolution Calling"	2015	—	20	—	—	—	—	—	—	—	—		Trust Fall (Side A)
"Nimble Bastard"	2017	—	22	—	—	—	—	—	—	—	—		8
"Loneliest"	2017	—	—	—	—	—	—	—	—	—	—		8
"Into the Summer"	2019	—	—	—	—	—	—	—	—	—	—		Trust Fall (Side B)
"Our Love"	2020	—	38	—	—	—	—	—	—	—	—		Trust Fall (Side B)
"—" denotes a release that did not chart.

== Promotional singles ==
Title	Year	Peak chart positions				Album
Title	Year	US Act. Rock	US Herit. Rock	US Main. Rock	CZ Rock	Album
"Redefine"	1997	—	—	—	—	S.C.I.E.N.C.E.
"Privilege"	2000	—	—	—	—	Make Yourself
"Circles"	2002	26	37	31	—	Morning View
"Agoraphobia"	2005	—	—	—	—	A Crow Left of the Murder...
"Sick Sad Little World"	2005	—	—	—	—	A Crow Left of the Murder...
"Here in My Room"	2005	—	—	—	—	A Crow Left of the Murder...
"Neither of Us Can See"	2005	—	—	—	—	Stealth Soundtrack
"Thieves"	2011	—	—	—	—	If Not Now, When?
"Glitterbomb"	2017	—	—	—	13	8
"State of the Art"	2017	—	—	—	—	8
"Undefeated"	2017	—	—	—	—	8
"No Fun"	2018	—	—	—	—	8
"—" denotes a release that did not chart.

== Music videos ==
Title	Year	Director(s)
"Take Me to Your Leader"	1996	Kenny Morrison
"A Certain Shade of Green"	1997	Kenny Morrison
"Summer Romance"	1998	Brett Spivey
"Pardon Me"	1999	Steven Murashige
"I Miss You"	1999	Brett Spivey
"Privilege"	2000	Brian Smith
"Out from Under"	2000	Brett Spivey
"Stellar"	2000	Phil Harder
"Drive"	2001	Phil Harder
"Wish You Were Here"	2001	Phil Harder
"Wish You Were Here" (MTV version)	2001	Brandon Boyd, Phil Harder, Brett Spivey
"Nice to Know You"	2001	Jeb Brien
"Circles"	2001	Jeb Brien
"Warning"	2001	Francis Lawrence
"Are You In?"	2002	Dewey Nicks
"Megalomaniac"	2004	Floria Sigismondi
"Talk Shows on Mute"	2004	Floria Sigismondi
"Make a Move"	2005	Marc Webb
"Anna-Molly"	2006	Jamie Thraves
"Dig"	2006	Carlos "Kaamuz" Oliveira
"Love Hurts"	2007	
"Black Heart Inertia"	2009	Petro Papahadjopoulos
"Adolescents"	2011	Brantley Gutierrez
"Promises, Promises"	2011	Price James
"Absolution Calling"	2015	Brantley Gutierrez
"Nimble Bastard"	2017	James Larese
"Loneliest"	2018	Julian Schratter
"No Fun"	2018	Julian Schratter
"State of the Art"	2018	Brandon Boyd, Julian Schratter
"Into the Summer"	2019	Frank Borin
"Our Love"	2020	Meiert Avis

== Cover songs ==
Incubus has covered the following songs:

Song covered	Original artist
"ABC"	Jackson 5
"Alison"	Elvis Costello
"Another One Bites the Dust"	Queen
"...Baby One More Time"	Britney Spears
"Billie Jean"	Michael Jackson
"Black Hole Sun"	Soundgarden
"Bump n' Grind"	R. Kelly
"Careless Whisper"	George Michael
"Theme from Close Encounters of the Third Kind"	John Williams
"Come On Be My Baby Tonight"	David Broom, of The Real World: New Orleans
"Come Together"	The Beatles
"De Do Do Do, De Da Da Da"	The Police
"Earth Angel"	The Penguins
"Elastic Heart"	Sia
"Every Little Step"	Bobby Brown
"Eye of the Tiger"	Survivor
"Explosivo"	Tenacious D
"Grease is the Word" (theme song from Grease)	Frankie Valli
"Hello"	Lionel Richie
"Hungry Like the Wolf"	Duran Duran
"I Can See for Miles"	The Who
"I Can't Explain"	The Who
"I Want You Back"	Jackson 5
"If You Don't Know Me by Now"	Simply Red
"Immigrant Song"	Led Zeppelin
"It Ain't Over 'til It's Over"	Lenny Kravitz
"Joanna"	Kool & the Gang
"John the Fisherman"	Primus
"The Joker"	Steve Miller Band
"Let's Go Crazy"	Prince
"Like a Virgin"	Madonna
"Man Eater"	Hall & Oates
"Message in a Bottle"	The Police
"Misirlou" (Pulp Fiction Theme)	Dick Dale
"Milkshake"	Kelis
"My Girl"	The Temptations
"Need You Tonight"	INXS
"Night and Day"	Frank Sinatra
"No Scrubs"	TLC
"Paint It Black"	The Rolling Stones
"Pony"	Ginuwine
"Powerslave"	Iron Maiden
"Protection"	Massive Attack
"(Anesthesia) Pulling Teeth"	Metallica
"Que Pasara"	Café Tacuba
"Riders on the Storm"	The Doors
"Rockit"	Herbie Hancock
"Roxanne"	The Police
"Singin' in the Rain"	Gene Kelly
"Sleep Walk"	Santo & Johnny
"Stand by Me"	Ben E. King
"Still Not a Player"	Big Pun
SpongeBob SquarePants Theme Song	Painty the Pirate (Patrick Pinney)
"Suffragette City"	David Bowie
"Teardrop"	Massive Attack
"The End"	The Doors
"The Road"	Tenacious D
"The Siamese Cat Song"	Lady and the Tramp
"The Thong Song"	Sisqo
"Trenchtown Rock"	Bob Marley
"Walking on the Moon"	The Police
"Waltzing Matilda"	Banjo Paterson
"When Doves Cry"	Prince
"Whole Lotta Love"	Led Zeppelin
"Wicked Game"	Chris Isaak
"Wish You Were Here"	Pink Floyd
"X-French Tee Shirt"	Shudder to Think
"Would?"	Alice in Chains
"Tom Sawyer"	Rush

== Soundtrack appearances ==
- Spawn: The Original Soundtrack (1997)
  - "Familiar" (with featuring. DJ Greyboy)
- Urban Legend (1998)
  - "Redefine" (previously appeared on S.C.I.E.N.C.E.)
- Scream 3 (2000)
  - "Crowded Elevator"
- Little Nicky (2000)
  - "Pardon Me" (previously appeared on Make Yourself)
- Dragon Ball Z: Bardock - The Father of Goku (2000)
  - "Nowhere Fast" (previously appeared on Make Yourself)
- Final Destination 2 (2003)
  - "Vitamin" (previously appeared on S.C.I.E.N.C.E.)
- Halo 2: The Original Soundtrack (2004)
  - "The Odyssey" (a four movement epic that totals 27 minutes long)
- Stealth: The Original Soundtrack (2005)
  - "Make a Move"
  - "Admiration"
  - "Neither of Us Can See" (duet with Chrissie Hynde)
  - "Aqueous Transmission" (previously appeared on Morning View)
- Surf's Up (2007)
  - "Drive" (previously appeared on Make Yourself)
- Hancock (2008)
  - "Beware! Criminal" (previously appeared on A Crow Left of the Murder...)

== Other appearances ==
- Family Values Tour 1998 (1998)
  - "New Skin (Live)"
- Strait Up (2000)
  - "Divided (An Argument for the Soul)"
- X-Fest (2000)
  - "Pardon Me" (Live)
- Live in the X Lounge (2000 and 2004)
  - "Pardon Me" (Live) • Live in the X Lounge III
  - "Talk Shows On Mute" (Live) • Live in the X Lounge VII
- Loud Rocks (2000)
  - "Still Not a Player" (with Big Pun)
- End Sessions, Vol. 2: The End 107.7 (2000)
  - "Pardon Me" (Live)
- Y100 Sonic Sessions (2000 and 2001)
  - "Pardon Me" (Live) • Y100 Sonic Sessions 4
  - "Drive" (Live) • Y100 Sonic Sessions 5
- WIIL Rock 95.1 Live CD (2001)
  - "Pardon Me" (Live)
- Live X (2001 and 2004)
  - "Drive" (Live) • Live X 7 – Black and White World
  - "Message in a Bottle" (Live) (The Police cover) • Live X 9: Joyride
- Swallow My Eggnog (2001)
  - "Get Your Dreidel On" (as Pudie Tadow)
- Visions: All Areas Vol. 129 (2011)
  - "Surface to Air"
