= Monuments and Melodies =

Greatest hits album by Incubus
- Released: June 16, 2009
- Venue: Live X, 99X, Atlanta (A Certain Shade of Green)
- Studio: 4th Street Recording, Santa Monica, California; NRG Studios, North Hollywood; Morning View Studio, Malibu, California; Southern Tracks Recording, Atlanta; Henson Recording Studio, Hollywood
- Genre: Alternative rock; alternative metal
- Length: 61:10 (disc 1); 47:22 (disc 2) (Total: 108:32)
- Label: Epic/Immortal
- Producer: Brendan O'Brien, Scott Litt

Incubus chronology
Light Grenades (2006)	Monuments and Melodies (2009)	If Not Now, When? (2011)

Monuments and Melodies is the first greatest hits compilation album by American rock band Incubus released on June 16, 2009, through Epic Records. It was released as a double-disc set, the first disc featuring 13 previously released singles from the albums Make Yourself, Morning View, A Crow Left of the Murder..., and Light Grenades, along with two new Brendan O'Brien–produced tracks, "Black Heart Inertia" and "Midnight Swim".

The second disc is a collection of rarities including B-sides, soundtrack cuts, alternate versions, three previously unreleased songs, and a cover of Prince's "Let's Go Crazy". The album takes its title from a song that was originally released as the B-side to "Megalomaniac" and as a bonus track on international releases of A Crow Left of the Murder...; it is also included on Disc 2 of this album.

== Reception ==
Professional ratings
Review scores
Source	Rating
AllMusic	4/5 stars
Rock Sound	9/10 stars

Stephen Thomas Erlewine of AllMusic gave the compilation four out of five stars, commenting that the first disc "does its job efficiently, running through all but two of Incubus' Billboard hits", and that the second disc "[provides] a nice service of rounding up the tunes that got away." Conrad Hughes of Contactmusic.com wrote in his June 2009 review that "the band's work reminds me a little bit of what the Chili Peppers may have done were Mike Patton their lead singer instead of Kiedis. And hopefully they'll follow up their Greatest Hits with a better album than the Chili's Stadium Arcadium." Craig Hlavaty of the Houston Press reflected in August 2009 that "It's been a long and varied career for the band, who started in 1991 as little more than teenagers armed with a Red Hot Chili Peppers tab book and unfinished algebra homework", adding that "Make Yourself turned the band away from the monotony of punk-funk into more soulful, organic territory. Overnight, Incubus seemingly took a turn from mookish modern rock into straight-up makeout-core."

Aly Comingore of the Santa Barbara Independent stated in her July 2009 review that "the five musicians have crafted some of the most forward-thinking and experimental radio-friendly rock of their time, proving all the while that alt-metal can prosper within the mainstream-and attract the attention of millions."

== Track listing ==
=== Disc 1 (Monuments) ===
Monuments track listing
No.	Title	Album	Length
1.	"Black Heart Inertia"	Monuments and Melodies	4:53
2.	"Drive"	Make Yourself	3:52
3.	"Megalomaniac"	A Crow Left of the Murder...	4:54
4.	"Anna Molly"	Light Grenades	3:46
5.	"Love Hurts"	Light Grenades	3:57
6.	"Wish You Were Here"	Morning View	3:36
7.	"Warning"	Morning View	4:42
8.	"Stellar"	Make Yourself	3:20
9.	"Talk Shows on Mute"	A Crow Left of the Murder...	3:52
10.	"Pardon Me"	Make Yourself	3:44
11.	"Dig"	Light Grenades	4:17
12.	"Oil and Water"	Light Grenades	3:49
13.	"Are You In?"	Morning View	4:24
14.	"Nice to Know You"	Morning View	4:43
15.	"Midnight Swim"	Monuments and Melodies	3:15
Total length:			61:10

Japanese disc 1 bonus tracks
No.	Title	Album	Length
16.	"Make a Move"	Stealth (Soundtrack)	3:14
17.	"New Skin"	Let Me Tell Ya 'Bout Root Beer / S.C.I.E.N.C.E.	3:51
Total length:			68:15

=== Disc 2 (Melodies) ===
Melodies track listing
No.	Title	Album	Length
1.	"Neither of Us Can See"	Stealth (Soundtrack)	4:04
2.	"Look Alive"	Light Grenades (Japanese edition)	4:21
3.	"While All the Vultures Feed"	Monuments and Melodies	3:53
4.	"Pantomime" (Altered version)	Monuments and Melodies	4:39
5.	"Anything"	Morning View Previously unreleased track	3:32
6.	"Punch Drunk"	Light Grenades (Japanese edition)	5:14
7.	"Admiration"	Stealth (Soundtrack)	4:13
8.	"Martini"	Monuments and Melodies	4:09
9.	"A Certain Shade of Green" (Live acoustic version)	S.C.I.E.N.C.E. / Monuments and Melodies	3:36
10.	"Monuments and Melodies"	"Megalomaniac"	5:06
11.	"Let's Go Crazy" (Prince cover)	Purple Rain / Monuments and Melodies	4:29
Total length:			47:22

Japanese disc 2 bonus tracks
No.	Title	Album	Length
12.	"Follow" (Vocal Version)	Halo 2 (Original Soundtrack Volume One) / Alive at Red Rocks	3:35
13.	"Make Yourself" (Acoustic Version)	Make Yourself / When Incubus Attacks Volume 1	3:23
14.	"Crowded Elevator"	Pardon Me	4:44
Total length:			59:04

iTunes bonus track
No.	Title	Album	Length
15.	"Pardon Me" (Live)	Make Yourself / Monuments and Melodies	4:16
Total length:			63:20

iTunes pre-order bonus tracks
No.	Title	Album	Length
16.	"Mexico" (Live at Hammerstein Ballroom, New York, NY - September 2001)	Morning View / Monuments and Melodies	4:40
17.	"Drive" (Orchestral Live Version)	Make Yourself / Monuments and Melodies	4:04
Total length:			72:04

== Personnel ==
- Brandon Boyd – lead vocals; djembe (on "New Skin"), album cover
- Mike Einziger – guitar, backing vocals, occasional keyboards
- Alex Katunich – bass (on all tracks of S.C.I.E.N.C.E., Make Yourself, & Morning View)
- José Pasillas – drums
- DJ Lyfe – turntables (on "New Skin")
- Chris Kilmore – turntables, keyboards, synthesizers, piano, theremin on all tracks except "New Skin".
- Ben Kenney – bass, backing vocals (on all tracks of A Crow Left of the Murder..., Megalomaniac, Halo 2 Original Soundtrack, Stealth soundtrack, Light Grenades, & Monuments and Melodies)

== Charts ==
Chart (2009)	Peak position
Australian Albums (ARIA)	20
Austrian Albums (Ö3 Austria)	24
Canadian Albums (Billboard)	20
German Albums (Offizielle Top 100)	35
Irish Albums (IRMA)	96
Italian Albums (FIMI)	76
New Zealand Albums (RMNZ)	3
Swiss Albums (Schweizer Hitparade)	22
UK Albums (OCC)	104
UK Album Downloads (OCC)	96
UK Rock & Metal Albums (OCC)	5
US Billboard 200	5
US Top Alternative Albums (Billboard)	2

== Certifications ==
Region	Certification	Certified units/sales
United Kingdom (BPI)	Silver	60,000^{‡}
^{‡} Sales+streaming figures based on certification alone.
