= Look Alive =

Look Alive may refer to:

- Look Alive (Guster album) or the title song, 2019
- Look Alive, an EP by We Are the Ocean, or the title song, 2009
- Look Alive, a video by Incubus, 2007
- "Look Alive" (BlocBoy JB song), 2018
- "Look Alive" (Rae Sremmurd song), 2016
- "Mimic- EP", 2023
