= Live in Sweden =

Live in Sweden may refer to:

- Live in Sweden, album by Theatre of Hate 2006
- Live In Sweden, by Albert King 1980 DVD
- Live In Sweden, album by Vixen (band) 2013
- Live In Sweden, album by Mott The Hoople 1971
- Live in Sweden (Stiff Little Fingers bootleg album)
- Live in Sweden (Incubus album) 2004
