= Light Grenades =

Studio album by Incubus
- Released: November 28, 2006
- Recorded: January–July 2006
- Studios: Henson Recording Studio, Hollywood, California; Southern Tracks Recording, Atlanta, Georgia
- Genre: Alternative rock
- Length: 47:36
- Labels: Epic; Immortal
- Producer: Brendan O'Brien

Incubus chronology
Live in Malaysia 2004 (2004)	Light Grenades (2006)	Monuments and Melodies (2009)

Singles from Light Grenades
- 1. "Anna Molly" Released: September 20, 2006; 2. "Dig" Released: March 27, 2007; 3. "Oil and Water" Released: June 5, 2007; 4. "Love Hurts" Released: 2008

Light Grenades is the sixth studio album by the American rock band Incubus, released on November 28, 2006, on Epic. The album sold 359,000 copies during its first week of release worldwide and debuted at number one on the Billboard 200, selling 165,000 copies in the US in its first week. It is the band's first number-one album. The album achieved Gold certification, less than the band's previous Platinum records beginning with 1999's Make Yourself.

== History ==
"Earth to Bella" and "Love Hurts" made their live debut in front of an audience at the Make Some Noise concert on April 29, 2006.

"A Kiss to Send Us Off" and "Anna Molly" made their live debut on VH1's Decades Rock: Live Tribute to the Pretenders on August 11, 2006, even though the songs were not featured in the program. The same two songs were also performed at Edgefest 2006 on September 30 at Tempe Beach Park, Arizona.

"Rogues" made its debut at a pair of pre album-release shows at the London Astoria and the Berlin Postbahnhof on November 14 and 16, 2006.

The songs "Punch Drunk" and "Look Alive" were recorded during the Light Grenades sessions, but were originally only available as bonus tracks on the Japanese edition of the album. Live versions have since seen release worldwide on the Look Alive live DVD. The studio versions of both songs are also on Monuments and Melodies.

== Musical style ==
Incubus guitarist Mike Einziger commented in an interview with MTV that the album "sounds like 13 different bands playing 13 different songs... Every time we're about to start making a new album, I tell myself, 'Okay, this one's going to be cohesive,' and it never happens." For the most part, Light Grenades expands upon the sounds previously explored in 2004's A Crow Left of the Murder....

Other songs showcase a new direction for the band. For example, Brandon Boyd describes the curious recording technique behind "Paper Shoes": "There's a song called 'Paper Shoes' where Michael and I mic'd our bodies with ambient mics and did the percussion tracks pounding on our chests and skulls. The galloping rhythm is us pounding on our chests. It was really funny. We were trying so hard not to laugh because we were sitting there like cavemen beating our chests!"

== Themes ==
When asked about the album title by Kerrang! in 2006, Boyd explained:

There's a song called that on the record and it felt like the most pertinent conceptual aspect of the album, the idea of throwing ideas at problems and the ideas explode with light and good results and intention on consciousness. So I started imagining imagery of students in different countries protesting and throwing Molotov cocktails with masks over their faces. But there's one brave student who runs up to the police line and, as opposed to throwing rocks or things that destroy, there's this concept of that one courageous, lonely student running up and throwing ideas and having them actually change things. It just seemed kind of a cool concept: the redefining of weaponry.

== Critical reception ==
Professional ratings
Aggregate scores
Source	Rating
Metacritic	65/100
Review scores
Source	Rating
AllMusic	4/5 stars
Alternative Press	3/5 stars
Blender	3/5 stars
Entertainment Weekly	B+
IGN	8.8/10
MusicOMH	3/5 stars
PopMatters	7/10
Rock Sound	8/10
Rolling Stone	3/5 stars
Spin	2.5/5 stars

According to the review aggregator Metacritic, Light Grenades received "generally favorable reviews" based on a weighted average score of 65 out of 100 from 13 critic scores. However, Beats per Minute later identified this album as the start of Incubus' decline in quality that continued with later, softer releases such as If Not Now, When? (2011).

Jon Foreman of IGN praised the single "Dig" in his December 2006 review, but also noted, "Incubus is not limited to poppy, commercially viable tracks like this; tracks that can be (and have been) the downfall of other, less forward thinking bands. With influences from Faith No More to Ani DiFranco, the almost schizophrenic range they have established for themselves counts wholeheartedly on the fact that fans and critics alike realize that the varying genres they incorporate into their music compliment [sic] one another with credible aplomb. In other words, they would not be able to make a track like 'Dig' work on the album without complimentary [sic] tracks like 'Pendulous Threads' or 'Light Grenades'". Mike Schiller of PopMatters wrote in January 2007, "Boyd sounds as Patton-esque in his modern rock operatics as ever, and the band has perfected the transition from studio-friendly perfectionists to intentionally messy well-produced garagers". He further adds, "Incubus has never made a perfect album - no, not even S.C.I.E.N.C.E. - and Light Grenades, truth told, is far from perfect. 'A Kiss to send us off' sounds a little too much like it’s aping Foo Fighters, both 'Earth to Bella' tracks sound forced and disjoint, and there’s still a little too much in the way of faceless middle-of-the-road rock ‘n roll. Even so, there’s not a single track on Light Grenades that’s truly revolting".

Joe Crofton of MusicOMH considered it to be an improvement over A Crow Left of the Murder.... He wrote in his November 2006 review, "I wasn’t expecting much, and on the first hearing I thought my theory had been proved right. Incubus had devolved into a boring sell-out, pandering soft pop-rock to young girls. However, when I removed my sceptics glasses and opened my eyes I began to realise that there is so much more to this record. These are actual songs, in the vein of Make Yourself and the better half of Morning View. Whatever teething problems they may have been experiencing with new bassist Ben Kenney, it all seems to have been resolved." The Philippine Star said that the album "shows the group maturing into more accomplished artists."

On November 27, 2006, Jenny Eliscu of Rolling Stone awarded the album three out of five stars, claiming that Incubus were initially "written off as a rap-rock band", and that on the album they come "ever closer to becoming active-rock radio’s most sensitive, romantic and adventurous marquee act." She compared the title track to Butthole Surfers, and stated that the tracks "Oil and Water" and "Love Hurts" are "a pair of mammoth ballads the Chili Peppers might have authored." David Marchese of Spin wrote in December 2006 that, "by diverting attention from singer Brandon Boyd’s mostly inane lyrics with sun-dazed melodies and a crisp modern-rock sheen, they nail the profundo pop vibe of late-era Chili Peppers." A more negative review came from The Daily Orange's Andy McCullough, who wrote on November 27, 2006 that "Boyd leads a band that is missing a real identity" and that "Incubus has settled into a bland form of vaguely Californian alt rock, like the Red Hot Chili Peppers with a strung-out Anthony Kiedis and none of the guitar pyrotechnics of John Frusciante."

=== Legacy ===
When ranking the eight albums of Incubus in 2020, Kerrang! placed Light Grenades fifth, commenting that it was "showing signs of the burnout that would lead to their five-year hiatus." In a 2022 Louder Sound article, Brandon Boyd also placed the album fifth in his ranking of the Incubus discography, and reflected "we were in a creative love affair and still in the honeymoon phase. He [Ben] and Mikey had found each other, they were like instant musical partners, and there was a lot of creativity still floating around. But this was the time where a lot of interpersonal differences were coming in, it was the beginning of an era when things started taking longer than they usually had historically."

== Track listing ==
All tracks are written by Incubus.

No.	Title	Length
1.	"Quicksand"	2:13
2.	"A Kiss to Send Us Off"	4:16
3.	"Dig"	4:17
4.	"Anna Molly"	3:45
5.	"Love Hurts"	3:57
6.	"Light Grenades"	2:19
7.	"Earth to Bella (Part I)"	2:28
8.	"Oil and Water"	3:49
9.	"Diamonds and Coal"	3:46
10.	"Rogues"	3:56
11.	"Paper Shoes"	4:17
12.	"Pendulous Threads"	5:35
13.	"Earth to Bella (Part II)"	2:58
Total length:		47:36

Japanese bonus tracks
No.	Title	Length
14.	"Punch Drunk"	5:14
15.	"Look Alive"	4:21

iTunes bonus track
No.	Title	Length
14.	"Anna Molly" (acoustic)	3:59

Best-Buy pre-sale bonus disc
No.	Title	Length
14.	"Anna Molly" (live)	3:55
15.	"Drive" (live)	4:07
16.	"Love Hurts" (acoustic)	3:57

== Personnel ==
=== Incubus ===
- Brandon Boyd – lead vocals, percussion, guitar
- Mike Einziger – guitar, piano, rhodes, string arrangements, additional engineering, engineering and mixing on "Quicksand"
- Ben Kenney – bass, backing vocals
- Chris Kilmore – turntables, hammond B3, minimoog voyager, rhodes, mellotron, piano, marxophone, theremin
- José Pasillas – drums

=== Assistant engineers ===
- Tom Syrowski
- Matt Serricchio
- Glen Pittman
- Kevin Mills
- Tom Tapley

=== Others ===
- Brendan O'Brien – producer, mixing
- Nick DiDia – engineer
- Billy Bowers – additional engineering
- Suzi Katayama – strings conductor
- Bob Ludwig – mastering

== Charts ==
=== Weekly charts ===
Weekly chart performance for Light Grenades
Chart (2006–07)	Peak position
Australian Albums (ARIA)	15
Austrian Albums (Ö3 Austria)	16
Dutch Albums (Album Top 100)	82
French Albums (SNEP)	97
German Albums (Offizielle Top 100)	19
Irish Albums (IRMA)	79
Italian Albums (FIMI)	45
New Zealand Albums (RMNZ)	6
Scottish Albums (Official Charts)	55
Swiss Albums (Schweizer Hitparade)	23
UK Albums (Official Charts)	52
UK Rock & Metal Albums (Official Charts)	1
UK Rock & Metal Albums (OCC)	1
US Billboard 200	1
US Top Rock Albums (Billboard)	1

=== Year-end charts ===
Year-end chart performance for Light Grenades
Chart (2007)	Position
US Billboard 200	69
US Top Rock Albums (Billboard)	19

== Certifications ==
Certifications for Light Grenades
Region	Certification	Certified units/sales
Canada (Music Canada)	Gold	50,000^{^}
United Kingdom (BPI)	Silver	60,000^{‡}
United States (RIAA)	Gold	500,000^{^}
^{^} Shipments figures based on certification alone.^{‡} Sales+streaming figures based on certification alone.

== Release history ==
Region	Date
Europe	24 November 2006
America	28 November 2006
