= Black Heart Inertia =

Single by Incubus

from the album Monuments and Melodies
- Released: April 2, 2009
- Recorded: 2008
- Genre: Alternative rock
- Length: 4:53 (Album Version); 4:20 (Radio Edit)
- Label: Epic
- Songwriters: Brandon Boyd, Mike Einziger, Ben Kenney, Chris Kilmore, Jose Pasillas
- Producer: Brendan O'Brien

Incubus singles chronology
"Love Hurts" (2008)	"Black Heart Inertia" (2009)	"Midnight Swim" (2009)

Music video
- "Black Heart Inertia" on YouTube

"Black Heart Inertia" is the twentieth and first of the two new singles from the compilation album Monuments and Melodies released in the United States by rock group Incubus. The single was first streamed on the band's official site.

== Music video ==
The music video shows Brandon Boyd, working on a set. He appears to be an assistant, wearing a headphone and carrying a coffee, running late. The extras on the set show their disapproval by glaring and yelling at him. He is then seen giving a drink to another Brandon Boyd who is preparing to sing the song. The latter one spits his first sip out, becoming unable to continue the music video. The director of the music video coincidentally notices the striking similarities between the two Brandon Boyds, immediately telling his assistants to prepare the former for the music video. The former then begins to perform while everyone on the set begins to get into the song/music video by dancing along. A woman; who is seen sitting with the director; has a steamy kissing scene in the video. The director has a hard time watching his presumed girlfriend making out with Brandon Boyd and in a jealous rage, breaks up the scene. Stand-in Brandon then walks off the set, slipping in the spilled drink that the first Brandon refused to drink (cup indicates "non dairy soy extra foam BRANDON") then lands on the floor, coincidentally looking up the skirt of one of the earlier angry extras (who is presumed to be the stand-in for the original actress who was supposed to have the steamy scene with Brandon. This is interesting as the original female lead is assumed to be picked by the stand-in Brandon lead but this match up didn't work, so the stand-in Brandon showed his approval of the stand-in female lead, who he then shares an incredibly romantic kiss as the director looks on approvingly. The original female lead then gets jealous of the stand-in, slaps her director boyfriend and then cuts the lights of the set with a smirk on her face. Stand in Brandon is then seen leaving the warehouse as it fills with smoke/flames and passes all of the extras again with approval this time.

== Charts ==
Chart (2009)	Peak position
US Mainstream Rock (Billboard)	34
US Modern Rock Tracks (Billboard)	7
