= When Incubus Attacks Volume 2 =

Video by Incubus
- Released: December 11, 2001
- Venue: Snocore 2000 (main feature)
- Genre: Alternative rock

Incubus chronology
Morning View (2001)	When Incubus Attacks Volume 2 (2001)	The Morning View Sessions (2002)

When Incubus Attacks Volume 2 is a Video album/DVD released by the band Incubus in 2001. The main feature of the DVD is a collection of songs performed at the Sno-Core festival. Also included on the DVD are official music videos for all the bands singles released to that point. Included is an extra video for Anti-Gravity Love Song, a portion from an acoustic concert that the band played, and out-takes from the band backstage while at the festival, among other features.

== Video contents ==
1. GIGANTE ESPECIALLE! INTRO
2. New Skin (live)
3. Privilege (live)
4. Favorite Things (live)
5. Vitamin (live)
6. Pardon Me (live)
7. Warmth (live)
8. Make Yourself (live)
9. Calgone (live)
10. When It Comes (live)
11. Redefine (live)
12. ON THE BUS
13. SCENES FROM THE GREEN ROOM
14. Pardon Me (MadTV)
15. LIVE @ CHICAGO
16. BEATIN' LAS VEGAS
17. Take Me To Your Leader (official video)
18. Summer Romance (live)
19. A Certain Shade of Green (official video)
20. Pardon Me (official video)
21. ON THE SET: STELLAR
22. Stellar (official video)
23. I Miss You (official video)
24. ON THE SET: DRIVE
25. Drive (official video)
26. DISCOSABOROSO
27. AKOOSTIK KALI (Acoustic Concert)
  - Clean
  - A Certain Shade of Green
  - The Warmth
  - Summer Romance (Antigravity Love Song)
28. PROPS & MORE PROPS
