= Are You In? =

2002 single by Incubus

Single by Incubus

from the album Morning View
- Released: July 15, 2002
- Length: 4:24 (album version); 3:25 (radio edit)
- Label: Epic; Immortal
- Songwriter: Incubus
- Producer: Incubus

Incubus singles chronology
"Warning" (2002)	"Are You In?" (2002)	"Megalomaniac" (2003)

Music video
- "Are You In?" on YouTube

"Are You In?" is a song by American rock band Incubus. It was released in Europe and Australia as the fourth single from their fourth studio album, Morning View (2001), on July 15, 2002. The liner notes for the album contain no lyrics to this song (which all other songs have).

"Are You In?" became a moderate hit for the band, reaching number six in Portugal and the top 40 in Australia, Italy, and the United Kingdom. In New Zealand, it peaked at number five on the RIANZ Singles Chart, ended 2002 as the country's eighth-most successful single, and earned a platinum certification for sales and streaming figures exceeding 30,000 units. The song has since become a fan favorite and a staple during live performances.

== Track listings ==
UK CD single

1. "Are You In?" (album version)
2. "Are You In?" (Paul Oakenfold remix)
3. "Stellar" (acoustic)
4. "Are You In?" (video)

UK DVD single

1. "Are You In?" (uncensored video)
2. "Are You In?" (Paul Oakenfold remix audio)
3. "Stellar" (acoustic audio)
4. Behind-the-scenes footage from the Morning View Sessions

European 12-inch single

A1. "Are You In?" (album version)
A2. "Are You In?" (Paul Oakenfold remix)
B1. "Are You In?" (audio of live video)

European CD single

1. "Are You In?" (album version) – 4:24
2. "Are You In?" (Paul Oakenfold remix) – 3:43
3. "Stellar" (audio of live video) – 3:42
4. "Are You In?" (explicit video) – 3:28

Australian CD single

1. "Are You In?"
2. "Are You In?" (Paul Oakenfold remix)
3. "Wish You Were Here" (live)
4. "Warning" (live)
5. "Stellar" (live)

== Charts ==
=== Weekly charts ===
Weekly chart performance for "Are You In?"
Chart (2002)	Peak position
Australia (ARIA)	38
Denmark Airplay (Hitlisten)	11
Ecuador (Notimex)	5
Europe (Eurochart Hot 100)	84
Germany (GfK)	72
Ireland (IRMA)	43
Italy (FIMI)	37
Netherlands (Single Top 100)	86
New Zealand (Recorded Music NZ)	5
Portugal (AFP)	6
Scottish Singles Sales (Official Charts)	35
UK Singles (Official Charts)	34
UK Rock & Metal (Official Charts)	3

=== Year-end charts ===
Year-end chart performance for "Are You In?"
Chart (2002)	Position
New Zealand (RIANZ)	8

== Certifications ==
Certifications and sales for "Are You In?"
Region	Certification	Certified units/sales
New Zealand (RMNZ)	Platinum	30,000^{‡}
^{‡} Sales+streaming figures based on certification alone.

== Release history ==
Release dates and formats for "Are You In?"
Region	Date	Format(s)	Label(s)	Ref.
Australia	July 15, 2002	CD	Epic; Immortal	
Europe	July 15, 2002	CD	Epic; Immortal	
United Kingdom	September 2, 2002	CD	Epic; Immortal	
