= Live X =

Benefit compilation album series

Live X refers to concerts hosted by the Atlanta, Georgia-based radio station 99X, generally performed in an unplugged, acoustic style. Each year, a CD was released by 99X containing select tracks from many Live X concerts that occurred in the past year. All proceeds from the sales benefit the I Am 99X Foundation. The final edition, Live X 12, was released in 2007.

== Live X for Humanity ==
Live X for Humanity

Compilation album by Various Artists
- Recorded: 1993
- Genre: Alternative

This album benefited Habitat for Humanity.

1. "Believe" by Lenny Kravitz
2. "Mmm Mmm Mmm Mmm" by Crash Test Dummies
3. "Low" by Cracker
4. "Down By the River" by Indigo Girls
5. "It's a Shame About Ray" by Evan Dando
6. "Idaho" by Bodeans
7. "Divine Intervention" by Matthew Sweet
8. "Waiting for the Sun" by Jayhawks
9. "Creep" by Radiohead
10. "Felt So Cool" by Adam Schmitt
11. "Superman's Song" by Crash Test Dummies

== Live X II – One Life ==
Live X II

Compilation album by Various Artists
- Genre: Alternative

1. "Steppin' Out With My Baby" by Tony Bennett
2. "All I Wanna Do" by Sheryl Crow
3. "One" by Automatic Baby
4. "Laid" by James
5. "Zombie" by The Cranberries
6. "Fall Down" by Toad the Wet Sprocket
7. "Crucify" by Tori Amos
8. "Locked Out" by Crowded House
9. "Kim the Waitress" by Material Issue
10. "Good Enough" by Sarah McLachlan
11. "Operation Spirit" by Live
12. "I Need Love" by Sam Phillips
13. "Am I Wrong" by Love Spit Love
14. "I Left My Heart in San Francisco" by Tony Bennett

== Live X III – RAINN Songs ==
1. "Silent All These Years" by Tori Amos
2. "Name" by Goo Goo Dolls
3. "Satellite" by Dave Matthews Band
4. "I Want to Come Over" by Melissa Etheridge
5. "Desperately Wanting" by Better Than Ezra
6. "Ladder" by Joan Osborne
7. "Love Untold" by Paul Westerberg
8. "Fast Car" by Tracy Chapman
9. "Flood" by Jars of Clay
10. "Counting Blue Cars" by Dishwalla
11. "You Were Meant for Me" by Jewel
12. "Comedown" by Bush
13. "The Old Apartment" by Barenaked Ladies
14. "Love Songs" by Fleming and John

== Live X IV – Home ==
Live X IV

Compilation album by Various Artists
- Recorded: 1998
- Genre: Alternative

1. "Sunny Came Home" by Shawn Colvin
2. "Open Up Your Eyes" by Tonic
3. "Push" by Matchbox Twenty
4. "Sex and Candy" by Marcy Playground
5. "Song 2" by Blur
6. "Not an Addict" by K's Choice
7. "Try" by Michael Penn
8. "Shame on You" by Indigo Girls
9. "Dead Man Walking" by David Bowie
10. "Three Marlenas" by The Wallflowers
11. "Hell" by Squirrel Nut Zippers
12. "Frank Sinatra" by Cake
13. "Criminal" by Fiona Apple
14. "Long, Long Time" by Love Spit Love
15. "How's It Going to Be" by Third Eye Blind
16. "Is It Like Today" by World Party
17. "Home" by Sheryl Crow

== Live X V – Shimmer and Shine ==
Live X V

Compilation album by Various Artists
- Genre: Alternative

=== Disk I – Shimmer ===
1. "Lullaby" by Shawn Mullins
2. "Unsent" by Alanis Morissette
3. "Airport Song" by Guster
4. "She Talks to Angels" by The Black Crowes
5. "Prophecy" by Remy Zero
6. "I Am the Bullgod" by Kid Rock
7. "Freak of the Week" by Marvelous 3
8. "All for You" by Sister Hazel
9. "Don't Change Your Plans" by Ben Folds Five
10. "Cathedrals" by Jump, Little Children
11. "The Way" by Fastball
12. "Inside Out" by Eve 6
13. "Shimmer" by Fuel

=== Disk II – Shine ===
1. "Shimmer" by Shawn Mullins
2. "Can't Not" by Alanis Morissette
3. "Demons" by Guster
4. "Remedy" by The Black Crowes
5. "Gramarye" by Remy Zero
6. "Cowboy" by Kid Rock
7. "Let Me Go" by Marvelous 3
8. "Wanted It to Be" by Sister Hazel
9. "Magic" by Ben Folds Five
10. "B-13" by Jump, Little Children
11. "Sooner or Later" by Fastball
12. "Open Road Song" by Eve 6
13. "Bittersweet" by Fuel

== Live X 6 – Walk Unafraid ==
Live X 6

Compilation album by Various Artists
- Recorded: 2001
- Genre: Alternative

This album benefited the Georgia Litigation Fund and the Georgia Equality Project.

1. "Walk Unafraid" by R.E.M.
2. "Everything You Want" by Vertical Horizon
3. "Is Anybody Home?" by Our Lady Peace
4. "Spaceship" by Angie Aparo
5. "My Hero" by Foo Fighters
6. "If You Could Only See" by Tonic
7. "Can't Change Me" by Chris Cornell
8. "Meet Virginia" by Train
9. "Age of Innocence" by Billy Corgan
10. "Yeah, Whatever" by Splender
11. "Heavy" by Collective Soul
12. "Atlanta" by Stone Temple Pilots

== Live X 7 – Black and White World ==
Live X 7

Compilation album by Various Artists
- Genre: Alternative

1. "The Beauty of Gray" by Live
2. "Hanging by a Moment" by Lifehouse
3. "Leaving Town" by Dexter Freebish
4. "Drive" by Incubus
5. "The Middle" by Jimmy Eat World
6. "Life on a Chain" by Pete Yorn
7. "Babylon" by David Gray
8. "The Space Between" by Dave Matthews
9. "Camera One" by Josh Joplin Group
10. "Letters" by Stroke 9
11. "Drops of Jupiter (Tell Me)" by Train
12. "Tribute" by Tenacious D

== Live X 8 – Hidden ==
Live X 8

Compilation album by Various Artists
- Genre: Alternative

1. "Yellow" by Coldplay
2. "Running Away" by Hoobastank
3. "Losing My Religion" by R.E.M.
4. "Flake" by Jack Johnson
5. "Sober" by Butch Walker
6. "Comfort Eagle" by Cake
7. "Save Me" by Remy Zero
8. "Fine Again" by Seether
9. "Capricorn" by Thirty Seconds to Mars
10. "Control" by Puddle of Mudd

- "The Scientist" by Coldplay (Hidden Track)
- "Crawling in the Dark" by Hoobastank (Hidden Track)
- "All the Way to Reno (You're Gonna Be a Star)" by R.E.M. (Hidden Track)

== Live X 9 – Joyride ==
Live X 9

Compilation album by Various Artists
- Recorded: 2003 – 2004
- Genre: Alternative

1. "Taking Off" by The Cure
2. "Silver and Cold" by AFI
3. "No One Knows" by Queens of the Stone Age
4. "Between Love and Hate" by The Strokes
5. "Message in a Bottle" by Incubus
6. "Heel Over Head" by Puddle of Mudd
7. "What's Your Number?" by Cypress Hill
8. "Mixtape" by Butch Walker
9. "Just Like You" by Three Days Grace
10. "Followed the Waves" by Melissa Auf der Maur
11. "Meant to Live" by Switchfoot

== Live X 10 – Recently and Relived ==
Live X 10

Compilation album by Various Artists
- Recorded: 2004 – 2005
- Genre: Alternative

=== Disk I – Recently ===
1. "Right Right Now Now" by Beastie Boys
2. "Only Happy When It Rains" by Garbage
3. "Run" by Snow Patrol
4. "Work" by Jimmy Eat World
5. "Gone For Good" by The Shins
6. "L.S.F." by Kasabian
7. "Somewhere Only We Know" by Keane
8. "The Bucket" by Kings of Leon
9. "Beautiful" by Moby
10. "Burn the Good Ones Down" by Red Letter Agent

=== Disk II – Relived ===
1. "Recently" by Dave Matthews Band
2. "Jaime" by Weezer
3. "My Hero" by Foo Fighters
4. "Walk Unafraid" by R.E.M.
5. "Song 2" by Blur
6. "Lullaby" by Shawn Mullins
7. "Yellow" by Coldplay
8. "Is Anybody Home?" by Our Lady Peace
9. "Waiting for the Sun" by The Jayhawks
10. "Comedown" by Bush
11. "Shame on You" by Indigo Girls
12. "Frank Sinatra" by Cake
13. "Don't Change Your Plans" by Ben Folds Five
14. "Criminal" by Fiona Apple
15. "Between Love and Hate" by The Strokes
16. "Drive" by Incubus

== Live X 11 – Strange Apparition ==
Live X 11

Compilation album by Various Artists
- Recorded: 2005 – 2006
- Genre: Alternative

1. "Nausea (The Chap Remix)" by Beck
2. "King Without a Crown" by Matisyahu
3. "Woman" by Wolfmother
4. "Soul Meets Body" by Death Cab for Cutie
5. "MakeDamnSure" by Taking Back Sunday
6. "Tear You Apart" by She Wants Revenge
7. "Brighter Than Sunshine" by Aqualung
8. "Angels Losing Sleep" by Our Lady Peace
9. "Save Me" by Shinedown
10. "Rooftops (A Liberation Broadcast)" by Lostprophets
11. "Razorblade" by Blue October
12. "Paralyzed" by Rock Kills Kid
13. "Riot Van" by Arctic Monkeys

== Live X 12 – Souls ==
Live X 12

Compilation album by Various Artists
- Recorded: 2007
- Genre: Alternative

1. "Bus Ride" by Rocco Deluca
2. "Phantom Limb" by The Shins
3. "From Yesterday" by Thirty Seconds to Mars
4. "Well Thought Out Twinkles" by Silversun Pickups
5. "I'm Designer" by Queens of the Stone Age
6. "The Moneymaker" by Rilo Kiley
7. "101" by Albert Hammond Jr.
8. "Believe" by The Bravery
9. "What If I Knew" by Dinosaur Jr.
10. "When Your Heart Stops Beating" by +44
11. "Say This Sooner" by The Almost
12. "One Man Revolution" by The Nightwatchman
13. "All the Same" by Sick Puppies
14. "Hey There Delilah" by Plain White T's
15. "Ultra Payloaded Satellite Party" by Perry Farrell's Satellite Party
