= Warning (Incubus song) =

Single by Incubus

from the album Morning View
- Released: April 8, 2002
- Studio: Stern House (Malibu, California)
- Length: 4:42 (album version); 3:50 (radio edit)
- Label: Epic; Immortal
- Songwriter: Incubus
- Producers: Incubus; Scott Litt

Incubus singles chronology
"Nice to Know You" (2001)	"Warning" (2002)	"Are You In?" (2002)

Music video
- "Warning" on YouTube

"Warning" is a song by American rock band Incubus. It was released on April 8, 2002, as the third single from their fourth studio album, Morning View (2001). The single peaked at No. 3, No. 27 and No. 4 on Billboard's Modern Rock Tracks, Mainstream Rock and Bubbling Under Hot 100 charts, respectively.

== Music video ==
The video (set in Sydney, Australia and directed by Francis Lawrence) shows a girl in a hoodie, wearing a digital watch, who stares blankly ahead, apparently oblivious to anyone around her, even though she stands in the middle of crowded areas, namely:

- an airport terminal
- a school classroom
- a church sanctuary aisle
- a grocery aisle
- a busy urban intersection
- an office
- a supermarket

However, at exactly 10:23 AM, she screams in an extremely shrill voice (which is, like most character dialogue in the video save for the band's singers, inaudible and subtitled), and screams for exactly one whole minute.

This process, according to the video, takes place over the course of three days. At the end of the video, it is revealed that exactly 10:24, all the places featured in the video are abandoned, as if the individuals who beheld the girl in any of these environments, and eventually, the entire city's populace, had suddenly vanished or were abducted. This is exemplified by:

- an inner-city public bus whose drivers and passengers have disappeared, but eventually runs onto the sidewalk.
- a dropped coffee mug
- a still-moving cart in the grocery store

The band itself is playing the song in a loft; they also disappear at the end of the video. The message of this song and video urges people to live life to the fullest, because at any moment it could be over.

== Charts ==
Chart performance for "Warning"
Chart (2002)	Peak position
US Bubbling Under Hot 100 (Billboard)	4
US Alternative Airplay (Billboard)	3
US Mainstream Rock (Billboard)	27
