= Love Hurts (Incubus song) =

2008 single by Incubus

Single by Incubus

from the album Light Grenades
- Released: March 2007 (Europe); 2008 (U.S)
- Recorded: 2006
- Genre: Alternative rock
- Length: 3:57
- Label: Epic
- Songwriters: Brandon Boyd, Mike Einziger, Ben Kenney, Chris Kilmore, José Pasillas
- Producer: Brendan O'Brien

Incubus singles chronology
"Oil And Water" (2007)	"Love Hurts" (2007)	"Black Heart Inertia" (2009)

"Love Hurts" is the third single from Incubus' sixth album, Light Grenades, released in Europe and is the fourth U.S. single ("Oil And Water" was released as the third single in the U.S.). The song received moderate airplay in European countries. The single was released for airplay in the United States over a year after the previous single, "Oil and Water", and nearly two years following the album's release. It became a surprise hit for the band in the U.S., topping the Billboard Modern Rock Tracks chart, becoming their fourth song to do so.

== Meaning ==
In a 2007 interview with Incubus, Brandon Boyd expressed his thoughts on the song:

It's almost a little bit of a cliché. It is talking about the idea of love and finding love and having it be pure and not tainted by our misperceptions, misconceptions, expectations and transcending the sort of more worldly aspects of the love experience.

== Music video ==
An unofficial video from a live concert (with audio of the studio track dubbed over the live performance) was released for the song on March 23, 2007. No official video was made for this song.

== Track listing ==
=== Single ===
1. "Love Hurts" (Album version)
2. "Anna-Molly"
3. "Drive"
4. "Love Hurts" (Video)

=== Promo single ===
1. "Love Hurts"
2. "Anna-Molly"

== Chart performance ==
"Love Hurts" was released to alternative radio in October 2008, and hit number one on Billboard's Hot Modern Rock Tracks chart for the week ending February 21, 2009. It joins "Drive", "Megalomaniac", and "Anna Molly" as one of four songs by the band to top the chart, and their only secondary single from an album era to accomplish this feat. It outpeaked previous singles from Light Grenades, "Oil And Water" and "Dig". It has also reached number one on Mediabase's Alternative airplay chart. It has charted on the Bubbling Under Hot 100 Singles at #13 (equivalent to #113 on the Billboard Hot 100).

== Charts ==
=== Weekly charts ===
Weekly chart performance for "Love Hurts"
Chart (2006–2009)	Peak position
Austria (Ö3 Austria Top 40)	12
Czech Republic Airplay (ČNS IFPI)	100
Germany (GfK)	29
Mexico Airplay (Billboard)	31
Quebec (ADISQ)	35
Switzerland (Schweizer Hitparade)	46
US Bubbling Under Hot 100 (Billboard)	13
US Alternative Airplay (Billboard)	1

=== Year-end charts ===
2007 year-end chart performance for "Love Hurts"
Chart (2007)	Position
Austria (Ö3 Austria Top 40)	60

2009 year-end chart performance for "Love Hurts"
Chart (2009)	Position
US Hot Rock Songs (Billboard)	11
