= Morning View =

2001 studio album by Incubus

Studio album by Incubus
- Released: October 23, 2001
- Recorded: April–May 2001
- Studio: Stern House (Malibu, California)
- Genres: Alternative rock; alternative metal; hard rock; soft rock
- Length: 58:01
- Labels: Epic; Immortal
- Producers: Incubus; Scott Litt

Incubus chronology
When Incubus Attacks Volume 1 (2000)	Morning View (2001)	When Incubus Attacks Volume 2 (2001)

Singles from Morning View
- 1. "Wish You Were Here" Released: August 14, 2001; 2. "Nice to Know You" Released: December 4, 2001; 3. "Warning" Released: April 8, 2002; 4. "Are You In?" Released: July 15, 2002

Morning View is the fourth studio album by American rock band Incubus, released on October 23, 2001, through Epic and Immortal Records. A companion DVD, The Morning View Sessions, was released on May 29, 2002. Continuing the move away from nu metal, the album ranges widely from soft to hard rock sounds in the style of alternative rock. Morning View was the last Incubus album to feature bassist Alex Katunich, who left in 2003.

With the album producing the popular singles "Wish You Were Here" and "Nice to Know You", Morning View generally achieved critical praise and went double-platinum, making it the band's highest-selling album. A re-recorded version of the album, titled Morning View XXIII, was released on May 10, 2024. In this re-recorded version was included new bassist Nicole Row after Ben Kenney's departure due his recovery from brain tumor surgery.

== The Morning View Sessions ==
The Morning View Sessions

Video (DVD, VHS) by Incubus
- Released: May 28, 2002
- Venue: New York
- Genre: Alternative rock
- Length: 90 minutes
- Label: Epic/Immortal
- Director: Jeb Brien
- Producers: Allen Kelman, Philip Hack

Incubus chronology
When Incubus Attacks Volume 2 (2001)	The Morning View Sessions (2002)	Live at Lollaplooza 2003 (2003)

The Morning View Sessions is a live DVD by Incubus released on May 28, 2002. The DVD chronicles The Morning View Sessions concert that the band gave in New York City.

== Background and recording ==
To record the album, the band lived in Malibu, California, on a street called "Morning View Drive". Former bassist Alex Katunich (aka "Dirk Lance") noted that the band had previously "tried to do that for at least the writing portion of Make Yourself, but we didn't have enough clout at the time. When we were getting ready to write this one, we knew that we needed to get into a more creative place. The idea was to not feel as if you were driving [somewhere] to work on a record. You could just get up and it was a natural extension of your day."

Vocalist Brandon Boyd stated that the band "needed quick access to the beach because we're kinda spoiled brats sometimes. We need that outlet. At least I do. It's nice to write music all day and be like, 'I'm going to take a break, see you guys in two hours.'" Katunich claimed that the album's title came from the name of the street where it was recorded. Boyd notes that "every time we'd pull into the street we had the view of the ocean and Pacific Coast Highway. I got a big creative boner every time I'd show up to the house. Every time we'd pull up, DJ Kilmore would be like, 'Ah, Morning View. It's time to rock!'"

In a December 2001 interview, guitarist Mike Einziger talked about the decision to live and record in a house rather than in a conventional studio setting. He said, "it defied every criticism from people at the record label and management. There were a lot of people who thought it was a recipe for disaster. But we wanted to create an ideal environment for us to write and record music in. We knew what our goal was going in."

"Drive", the band's final single from their prior album Make Yourself, was released in late 2000 and started gaining popularity by the time Incubus moved into the house to record Morning View. Boyd said in 2012, "we were seeing fruits of our labor for the first time. But also everything that comes on the coat tails of new success; hence the fond memories as well as the challenging ones. I think perhaps that is one reason Morning View turned out the way that it did. It was unconsciously and consciously imbued with very real emotions, hopes, disappointments, and triumphs." Boyd had recently broken up with his girlfriend who he met during the recording of Make Yourself. Before meeting her he had just split from his previous girlfriend who was having an affair. He said in 2021, "I was coming off the heels of two, really just heartbreaking separations, like one after the other. So I was coming into the recording of Morning View excited, elated, filled with enthusiasm, and heartbroken all at the same time. Looking back, I feel really lucky because I was able to experience those things through the lens of music and art." After a month at the house, the band finished recording the album in May 2001, with Einziger remembering in 2002 "we were just on the verge of a musical orgasm after we finished Morning View. We felt like you'd feel after having the best sexual experience of your entire life. Exhausted, but extremely satisfied."

Out of the 30 songs the band sketched out for the album, 13 ended up on the final release. One of the unreleased songs called "Anything" was later released on the compilation album Monuments and Melodies. Other songs also added to Monuments and Melodies were "Wish You Were Here", "Nice to Know You", "Warning", "Are You In?", and "Mexico".

After the success of Make Yourself, Brandon Boyd started attaining popularity among female listeners, and would begin to take his shirt off for them during concerts. He was labelled as "MTV's newest weapon of mass heartbreak" and included on Teen People's list of "The Hottest Guys in Music" in 2001. In an interview with Spin shortly after the release of Morning View, it was noted that Boyd was "always getting chased by girls" as a child, before even forming Incubus. Around the making of the album, Mike Einziger also composed the rock and funk-based soundtrack for the comedy film Sol Goode, which was released in early 2003. The film featured Jared Leto in a small role, with his band Thirty Seconds to Mars later touring with Incubus in 2002.

== Music and lyrics ==
Morning View has been described as an alternative rock, alternative metal, hard rock, and soft rock album, which features a variety of styles such as ambience, aggression and groove. It has an overall softer sound than previous albums, especially apparent on songs like "11am", "Echo" and "Are You In?". The album also contains an acoustic ballad similar to "Drive" – "Mexico", complete with strings. However, Incubus's heavier side is still evident on tracks like "Blood on the Ground", "Have You Ever" and "Under My Umbrella". Mike Einziger stated in a 2001 interview with Spin, "there's pressure to be a heavy band in this whole scene, and we just really turned our backs on it completely. I think the world of rap-metal is just pathetically ridiculous. In my opinion, it's a very horrible place to be. We don't want to be part of anyone's little bullshit scene." Regarding the album's sound, Einziger notes that it "would've been really easy for us to try to replicate certain songs that did well on our last record, which we didn't do. We didn't do anything even remotely close to that. We put pressure on ourselves to make a good record because if none of us were happy with it, we'll all be miserable for the next two years while we're on tour."

The final song, "Aqueous Transmission", employs the use of Chinese instruments such as the pipa and features a Japanese-style orchestra led by multi-instrumentalist Suzie Katayama. The pipa used on the recording was given to Mike Einziger from Steve Vai. Katayama later collaborated with Einziger on the experimental Time-Lapse Consortium project in 2003, and he credited her with inspiring his deepening musical comprehension. "Aqueous Transmission" is the longest song on the album at 7 minutes and 46 seconds long, with the last minute consisting of frogs croaking outside the house in Malibu. At the time, Boyd joked that the song was intended to make "the listener pee in his/her pants" from relaxation. He later claimed in 2021 that the song was influenced by the music of Björk, saying "Mikey and I grew up kind of mutually obsessed with Björk’s music. There was so much we loved about it: the weirdness of it, the instrumentation, the arrangements, the choices that she was making and that the producers were making. So we were like, 'let's make a super Björky sounding breakbeat that’s really cool and eerie and mellow'." He adds, "from there, I started messing around with the lyrics, and I remember when he started playing that little riff over that kind of trip-hop sounding beat, I just started singing: 'I’m floating down a river'. That’s what it sounded like. To me, it sounded like we were on this psychedelic river cruise somewhere."

Many believed that the single "Nice to Know You" lyrically revolved around a failed relationship, although Boyd claimed in 2002 that this was not the case. Regarding the song's meaning, he said,

"I had a moment in my life about a year ago where I was way too close to everything that was going on and I was blind. I felt like I was asleep. And the clouds parted for kind of a strange reason and I gained perspective. What happened was my hand had fallen asleep on the airplane on the way to Europe and it remained asleep for about 10 days, which was kind of scary. I must have pinched a nerve or something. But as my hand started waking up, the clouds started breaking away from that emotional state as well. The two happened simultaneously, so I created a simple metaphor for it. So it's basically a song about gaining perspective on a situation."

== Touring and promotion ==
Morning View spawned three retail singles, beginning with "Wish You Were Here". The song was released on August 14, 2001, charting well and gaining significant rotation. In the original banned video for "Wish You Were Here", Incubus are getting chased by a large pack of female fans, and eventually jump off a bridge. According to Boyd, the video was inspired by a scene in the 1968 film Head, which starred American band the Monkees. An alternative music video would end up being made for the song shortly afterwards, as the original version was deemed to be mirroring the September 11 attacks. The alternative version depicted the band playing in a studio against a white backdrop, interspersed with home movies they had made.

The follow up single "Nice to Know You" gained substantial airplay as well. The video for "Nice to Know You" was shot on November 28, 2001 in San Diego at the UCSD's Rimac Arena. The third and final retail single "Are You In?" had a video exclusive to Europe due to its sensual nature and gained little attention compared to its predecessors. "Circles" and "Warning" were both released as promotional singles from the album, with the latter being released on April 8, 2002.

Once they had finished recording their new album in 2001, Incubus began touring with Hundred Reasons in Europe from June until the first week of July. They were also invited to play Moby's Area:One Festival alongside the likes of Outkast, the Roots, Paul Oakenfold, Carl Cox, and Nelly Furtado. In August, the band performed their first shows in Australia, New Zealand and Japan. Amidst touring, Incubus was still experiencing commercial milestones for Make Yourself, and they continued to headline throughout the remainder of the year. They were one of the first bands to play in New York City following the September 11 attacks, with the event not affecting the band's touring schedule. DJ Chris Kilmore told Billboard in November 2001, "we’re taking the stand that we’re not going to let some idiot who just wants to kill everybody affect our lives. We’re just going to keep doing what we do, and hopefully, everything will be alright."

In January 2002, the band toured Europe with 311 and Hoobastank. Incubus played on the Late Show with David Letterman on February 14, 2002. For the remainder of February and March, the group performed throughout Australia, New Zealand and Japan again as part of their "Pacific Tour", this time playing at a larger number of venues in these countries. While in Australia, they also shot the video for "Warning" in Sydney. They then returned to the US for their long-awaited Honda Civic Tour; joining their long-time friends from California, Hoobastank and Phantom Planet. These shows kept ticket prices low through sponsorship and saw the band give away cars to fans.

A concert DVD titled The Morning View Sessions, chronicling a concert in New York City in which the band played most of the album's songs, was released on May 28, 2002. The DVD reached #1 on the Billboard music videos chart and was certified platinum.

Incubus embarked on an American headlining tour on August 31, 2002, supported by Thirty Seconds to Mars. Their last concert during the Morning View touring cycle took place on November 2, 2002. The band took a break from touring and releasing music following this, and their next concerts would be at the Lollapalooza Festival in July 2003. Einziger told MTV in 2002, "we kind of had a seamless transition from our last record to our newest record, and we think maybe that this time around we should disappear for a little while." Boyd added in the same interview, "I think we're all getting sick of ourselves, so we need to run away, but we'll run away together 'cause we can't stay away from each other. Probably go and hang out in some place tropical, hopefully." Bassist Alex Katunich was asked to leave the band in October 2002, reportedly over personal and creative differences. His departure was announced to the media through a statement from Brandon Boyd in April 2003, with no official reason being given; He was replaced by Ben Kenney of the Roots.

On August 5, 2023, the band announced the release of Morning View XXIII, a complete rerecording of their 2001 album set for release on October 6 (subsequently postponed to 2024) by Virgin Music. Prior to the release of the album, Kenney departed from the band despite his recovery from cancer. Bassist Nicole Row (already touring in his place during his cancer treatment) was promoted to a full-time member, and played on Morning View XXIII. The re-recorded version, Morning View XXIII has three singles: Echo, Circles, and Under My Umbrella.

== Commercial response ==
Topping all previous Incubus records, Morning View debuted on the Billboard 200 at No. 2 with 266,000 copies sold in its first week. By December 2001, the album was certified platinum and still ranked No. 38 on the Top 200. Many of its singles would remain on the charts throughout the following year. After heavy touring and single rotation, Morning View would be the 40th best selling album of 2002.

== Reception ==
Professional ratings
Aggregate scores
Source	Rating
Metacritic	62/100
Review scores
Source	Rating
AllMusic	4.5/5 stars
Blender	3/5 stars
Entertainment Weekly	B
Los Angeles Times	2.5/4 stars
NME	2/5 stars
Q	4/5 stars
Rolling Stone	2.5/5 stars
Slant Magazine	3.5/5 stars
USA Today	3/4 stars
The Village Voice	C+

=== Critical response ===
The album received generally positive reviews. According to the review aggregator Metacritic, Morning View received "generally favorable reviews" based on a weighted average score of 62 out of 100 from 10 critic scores. Q stated that "even at their most acerbic or delicately downplayed extremes, Incubus are compelling", while CDNow noted that Incubus "has begun to grow up a bit".

Rolling Stone wrote in their November 2001 review, "for a new-metal band competing in a field of alpha males with pierced, sloping brows, the supple, even delicate Incubus have an awful lot of yin in their yang. Unlike Staind, who require a suspension of disbelief that they are, essentially, macho crybabies, and Crazy Town, who probably tinge their mook-hop with Orientalism so they can score with Asian strippers, the coolest thing about Incubus is the way they come front-and-center with their inner little girl. They’ve got the tender lyrics, the nonlinear arrangements, melodies you can soak in and neckbreaker riffs alternating with swaying metallic grooves that somehow say, 'Love me, OK?'." Entertainment Weekly gave the album a B in October 2001, and wrote, "lead singer/heartthrob Brandon Boyd, with his wavy locks and herbal-life philosophy, is the anti-Fred Durst", further adding that "Incubus’ nontraditional drift continues on Morning View, a third album that, with its sonic kitchen-sink approach to record making, feels more like a typical band’s experimental sixth album."

Sean Adams of Drowned in Sound awarded it a 9 out of 10 on November 21, 2001, writing, "the really special bit, is the typical heart-throb frontman, Brandon Boyd. He's got it made. His vocals are something special." Adams further writes, "lyrically there is that little extra you don’t and won't get from many, if any, of their peers. It may sound like self-empowered, dope smoking, hippy rubbish to some, but it's gotta be better for the kidz than some homophobic diatribes, surely?." AllMusic's Deren Svendsen awarded it a similarly high score of four-and-a-half out of five stars, noting, "the ratio of softer and mellower numbers have increased dramatically, to the point where hardcore fans of earlier material may be bewildered. For the most part, the transition works." He adds, "while it may not appeal to fans of the harder material, music lovers who like their rock a little less aggressive and a little more ambitious and, well, sensitive should give Morning View a spin." Dylan P. Gadino of CMJ New Music Monthly compared the album to Faith No More and Linkin Park in November 2001, still considering it to have the same metallic undertone of previous releases. He writes, "on Morning View, the group's third major label album, Boyd and company continue their journey into the metal mystic, guided by familiar cascading chord progressions and ethereal-to-plump dynamic sensibilities. There are aggressive rockers like 'Under My Umbrella' here, but lush yet-harsh metal tunes like 'Blood on the Ground' are more indicative of the album's sound." However, he did note a higher number of acoustic songs, observing that, "Morning View shows a softer Incubus, yet it also affirms the group as being visionary among today's hard rockers."

Daily Nexus writer Jessica Jardine had a more negative view of the band's new direction, remarking in November 2001, "the release of the mushy-gushy single 'Wish You Were Here' became an ominous harbinger of the kinder, fuzzier Incubus to come. Without skipping a beat, that’s just what Morning View delivers – into the waiting palms of pre-teen girls everywhere", adding that "the semi-charged 'Have You Ever' and 'Under My Umbrella' remind me of S.C.I.E.N.C.E. but lack the diaphragm-thrusting belts and off-beat experimentalism that once wooed me." She concluded her review by stating, "yes, Brandon, you are a towering heartthrob amid booty-obsessed playa-pimps, but do we really need this saccharin-coated love goo?." NME had a similarly negative review in October 2001, writing, "Morning View's insurmountable flaw is that Incubus sell themselves as an intelligent and sensitive rock band, without actually appearing especially intelligent or sensitive. They're hippies, basically." Mikael Wood of the Dallas Observer wrote that Morning View is "an unapologetically flowery record", adding that it "wraps the angular, hard-edged funk-metal the band made in the early '90s in a silvery wash of acoustic-guitar strumming, vaguely Eastern ambience, SoCal surfer beatitude and Lilith Fair-friendly sensitive-male empathy."

=== Legacy and accolades ===
On March 1, 2003, Einziger, along with Scott Litt, Dave Holdredge, and Rick Will, were nominated for a Grammy in the "Best Engineered Album (Non Classical)" category, for their work on Morning View.

The 2003 book The Rough Guide to Rock reflected that it was the band's "most fully realized take on their artistic vision", and that "the rock bits rock hard and the relaxed bits are quite gorgeous." Jim DeRogatis included it as an example of a modern psychedelic rock album in his 2003 book Turn on Your Mind: Four Decades of Great Psychedelic Rock, writing that Incubus took their sound "to a new level with this effort, shedding its earlier Primus and Red Hot Chili Peppers obsessions and merging hard rock, ethnic percussion, DJ scratching, string sections, analog synthesizers and a dramatic use of dynamics." In April 2002, Incubus were placed 29th on Spin's "Top 40 (Only Bands that Matter)" list, with the publication reflecting that, "over the past 11 years Incubus seamlessly evolved from funk metal dreadheads into a spiritual Sugar Ray that rocks." They add, "the California-dreamy riffs and gentle beats of 2001's Morning View gave modern rock radio an even fresher kick. Plus, lead singer Brandon Boyd's perennially exposed abs (the group's unofficial sixth member) inspired hordes of 12-year-old girls to discover what 'Aqueous Transmission' means."

In 2005, Morning View was ranked number 374 in Rock Hard magazine's book The 500 Greatest Rock & Metal Albums of All Time. In 2021, Kerrang! ranked it as the 17th best album of 2001, remarking "as really, really, ridiculously good-looking as they were, Brandon Boyd and his Calabasas compatriots were more than just pretty faces." The publication placed Morning View first when ranking Incubus's studio albums in 2020. In 2023, Alternative Press also placed it first in their ranking of the band's discography, as did Brandon Boyd in a 2022 Louder Sound article. In 2024, Loudwire staff elected it as the best hard rock album of 2001.

On October 23, 2021, the band performed a 20th anniversary livestream concert at the same location in which the album was recorded. Prior to the COVID-19 pandemic, the band had hoped to do a 20th anniversary tour for the album in 2021, following the success of their 20th anniversary tour for Make Yourself in 2019. On August 5, 2023, the band announced the release of Morning View XXIII, a complete rerecording of the album set for release on October 5 by Virgin Music. They simultaneously announced a concert at the Hollywood Bowl where they would perform Morning View in full, supported by Paris Jackson and Action Bronson, for the same day. Several days before the Hollywood Bowl concert, it was announced that the release of Morning View XXIII had been delayed to early 2024; the album was released on May 10, 2024.

== Track listing ==
All tracks are written by Brandon Boyd, Mike Einziger, Alex Katunich, Chris Kilmore, and José Pasillas.

Morning View track listing
No.	Title	Length
1.	"Nice to Know You"	4:43
2.	"Circles"	4:09
3.	"Wish You Were Here"	3:32
4.	"Just a Phase"	5:29
5.	"11am"	4:13
6.	"Blood on the Ground"	4:33
7.	"Mexico"	4:18
8.	"Warning"	4:38
9.	"Echo"	3:34
10.	"Have You Ever"	3:14
11.	"Are You In?"	4:24
12.	"Under My Umbrella"	3:28
13.	"Aqueous Transmission"	7:46
Total length:		58:01

Best Buy exclusive limited edition bonus CD
No.	Title	Length
1.	"The Warmth" (Live in New York City 9/16/01)
2.	"Wish You Were Here" (Live in New York City 9/16/01)

Australian bonus CD
No.	Title	Length
1.	"Pardon Me" (live in Denver)
2.	"Favorite Things" (live in Denver)
3.	"Clean" (live acoustic)
4.	"Drive" (acoustic)

Morning View XXIII track listing
No.	Title	Length
1.	"Nice to Know You"	6:34
2.	"Circles"	4:58
3.	"Wish You Were Here"	3:33
4.	"Just a Phase"	5:15
5.	"11am"	4:08
6.	"Blood on the Ground"	4:54
7.	"Mexico"	4:23
8.	"Warning"	4:42
9.	"Echo"	4:41
10.	"Have You Ever"	3:16
11.	"Are You In?"	4:14
12.	"Under My Umbrella"	3:41
13.	"Aqueous Transmission"	6:48
Total length:		61:07

== Personnel ==
Credits adapted from album's liner notes.

Incubus

- Brandon Boyd – vocals, percussion
- Mike Einziger – guitars, pipa on "Aqueous Transmission"
- Chris Kilmore – turntables
- Dirk Lance – bass guitar
- José Pasillas – drums
- Nicole Row – bass guitar (In Morning View XXIII)

Additional musicians

- Suzie Katayama – strings arranger
- Joel Derouin, Mario De Leon, Peter Kent, Gerry Hilera, David Stenske, Eve Butler – violins
- Evan Wilson, Karie Prescott – viola
- Larry Corbett, Dan Smith – cellos
- Jon Clarke – woodwinds
- Marne Boomershine – assistant contractor
- Dawn Beckham, Stephanie Alexander – background vocals on "Are You In?"
- Hailey Niswanger – flute on "Circles"
- Ann Marie Simpson-Einziger – cello on "Mexico" and "Aqueous Transmission" (In Morning View XXIII)

Production

- Produced by Scott Litt and Incubus
- Rick Will, Dave Holdredge, Mike Einziger, and Scott Litt – recording engineer
- Rick Will and Scott Litt – mixing
- Dave Holdredge – digital recording/editing
- Tom Sweeney – engineer
- Bob Ludwig – mastering
- Tom Syrowski – engineer (In Morning View XXIII)
- Adam Hawkins – mixing (In Morning View XXIII)
- Chris Gehringer – mastering (In Morning View XXIII)

== Charts ==
=== Weekly charts ===
Weekly chart performance for Morning View
Chart (2001–2002)	Peak position
Australian Albums (ARIA)	3
Austrian Albums (Ö3 Austria)	38
Canadian Albums (Billboard)	3
Dutch Albums (Album Top 100)	57
Europe (European Top 100 Albums)	26
Finnish Albums (Suomen virallinen lista)	35
French Albums (SNEP)	39
German Albums (Offizielle Top 100)	27
Irish Albums (IRMA)	56
Italian Albums (FIMI)	27
New Zealand Albums (RMNZ)	8
Portuguese Albums (AFP)	9
Scottish Albums (Official Charts)	14
Swiss Albums (Schweizer Hitparade)	59
UK Albums (Official Charts)	15
US Billboard 200	2

Weekly chart performance for Morning View XXIII
Chart (2024)	Peak position
Australian Vinyl Albums (ARIA)	10
Belgian Albums (Ultratop Wallonia)	163
Croatian International Albums (HDU)	32
French Physical Albums (SNEP)	67
German Albums (Offizielle Top 100)	50
Scottish Albums (Official Charts)	30
Spanish Physical Vinyl Albums (PROMUSICAE)	87
Swiss Albums (Schweizer Hitparade)	56
UK Album Sales (OCC)	24
UK Album Downloads (Official Charts)	33
US Top Album Sales (Billboard)	13
US Top Hard Rock Albums (Billboard)	21

=== Year-end charts ===
2001 year-end chart performance for Morning View
Chart (2001)	Position
Canadian Albums (Billboard)	104
US Billboard 200	183

2002 year-end chart performance for Morning View
Chart (2002)	Position
Australian Albums (ARIA)	73
Canadian Albums (Billboard)	159
Canadian Alternative Albums (Billboard)	51
Canadian Metal Albums (Billboard)	25
New Zealand Albums (RMNZ)	16
US Billboard 200	40

== Certifications ==
Certifications for Morning View
Region	Certification	Certified units/sales
Australia (ARIA)	Platinum	70,000^{^}
New Zealand (RMNZ)	2× Platinum	30,000^{^}
United Kingdom (BPI)	Gold	100,000^{^}
United States (RIAA)	2× Platinum	2,000,000^{^}
^{^} Shipments figures based on certification alone.
