= Nice to Know You =

2001 single by Incubus

Single by Incubus

from the album Morning View
- Released: December 4, 2001
- Studio: Stern House (Malibu, California)
- Length: 4:43
- Label: Epic; Immortal
- Songwriters: Brandon Boyd; Mike Einziger; Alex Katunich; Chris Kilmore; José Pasillas
- Producers: Incubus; Scott Litt

Incubus singles chronology
"Wish You Were Here" (2001)	"Nice to Know You" (2001)	"Warning" (2002)

Music video
- "Nice to Know You" on YouTube

"Nice to Know You" is the first track and second single by American rock band Incubus from their fourth studio album, Morning View (2001). Released on December 4, 2001, it peaked at number nine on both the US Billboard Modern Rock Tracks and Mainstream Rock Tracks charts, as well as number five on the Bubbling Under Hot 100. It also charted in Australia, where it reached number 59 on the ARIA Singles Chart.

== Music video ==
The video, directed by Jeb Brien, features the band performing the song at the Bakersfield Convention Center on January 3, 2002, with opening acts Audiovent and Hoobastank.

== Track listing ==
1. "Nice to Know You"
2. "Glass" (Live)
3. "Just a Phase" (Live)
4. "Nice to Know You" (Live)

== Charts ==
=== Weekly charts ===
Weekly chart performance for "Nice to Know You"
Chart (2002)	Peak position
Australia (ARIA)	59
US Alternative Airplay (Billboard)	9
US Mainstream Rock (Billboard)	9
US Bubbling Under Hot 100 (Billboard)	5
US Radio Songs (Billboard)	85

=== Year-end charts ===
Year-end chart performance for "Nice to Know You"
Chart (2002)	Position
US Modern Rock Tracks (Billboard)	31

== Release history ==
Release dates and formats for "Nice to Know You"
Region	Date	Format(s)	Label(s)	Ref.
United States	December 4, 2001	Mainstream rock; active rock radio	Epic; Immortal	
Australia	March 4, 2002	CD	Epic; Immortal	
