= Wish You Were Here (Incubus song) =

2001 single by Incubus

Single by Incubus

from the album Morning View
- B-side: "Mexico" (live); "Drive" (live); "The Warmth" (live); "Wish You Were Here" (live)
- Released: August 14, 2001
- Genre: Rock
- Length: 3:36
- Label: Epic; Immortal
- Songwriters: Brandon Boyd; Mike Einziger; Alex Katunich; Chris Kilmore; José Pasillas
- Producers: Scott Litt; Incubus

Incubus singles chronology
"Drive" (2000)	"Wish You Were Here" (2001)	"Nice to Know You" (2002)

Music video
- "Wish You Were Here" on YouTube

"Wish You Were Here" is a song by American rock band Incubus and the lead single from their fourth studio album, Morning View. Released on August 14, 2001, it peaked at number two on the US Billboard Modern Rock Tracks chart and number four on the Billboard Mainstream Rock Tracks chart that year. "Wish You Were Here" would later be included on the 2009 greatest hits compilation Monuments and Melodies.

== Background, music, and lyrics ==
Prior to release, the track "Wish You Were Here" was played during Moby's Area:One summer festival in 2001. It was announced as Morning View's lead single in June that year. Guitarist Mike Einziger noted that "Wish You Were Here" was one of the last songs written for Morning View and that "the content is about being happy living for the moment and not looking forward to the future as some event." Vocalist Brandon Boyd also elaborated on its meaning:

"The song wasn't specifically about a person. It was about me acknowledging a very brief moment in my life and in my experience with all of these guys in making this record. In that moment, I wish that I had somebody to go, 'I love you, man.' I was wishing that there was someone there to share that moment with."

== Music videos ==
A music video for "Wish You Were Here" was scheduled for an August 2001 shooting with director Phil Harder. Einziger anticipated finishing everything within a single day like previous Incubus videos had been made. Although it could be streamed from the band's website, in light of the recent September 11 attacks where victims leapt from the Twin Towers, the original "Wish You Were Here" video would be rejected. Boyd remarked on the video's controversy:

We spent a lot of money, a lot of days, blood, sweat, tears, and then it was deemed inappropriate by our people and MTV. . . In the original video, we were emulating a scene from the movie Head by The Monkees. [In the movie] there were thousands of screaming women and Army people, cops, clowns and photographers chasing the Monkees off this bridge. The only [thing they can do] is jump. We [shot a scene where we're] running away from these people. That part was [deemed] inappropriate — screaming girls, screaming people. Then, our only place to go is to leap off this bridge, and it shows us descending and smacking into the water. Which, before the whole thing happened, we had a great laugh with.

— Brandon Boyd

The second version, which found substantial airplay upon its late September premiere, has the band performing in front of a white backdrop, a light breeze blowing toward them. The quickly composed substitute mixed the Phil Harder white-backdrop footage with various "home video"-styled footage shot and edited by Brett Spivey of the band members during album production at their Morning View house, including in their control room, at their swimming pool, playing ocean-view lawn golf, and enjoying other summer activities. By December 2001, it reached number eight on MTV's Total Request Live.

In May 2002, the original "bridge jump" version as well as behind the scenes footage would be included on The Morning View Sessions DVD. The video also aired years later on Fuse TV.

== Live performances ==
"Wish You Were Here" was performed on the Late Show with David Letterman on November 1, 2001. Upon winning Billboard's Modern Rock Single of the Year at the 2001 Billboard Music Awards for "Drive," Incubus performed "Wish You Were Here" at the award show.

== Track listings ==
Australian CD single

1. "Wish You Were Here"
2. "Mexico" (live)
3. "The Warmth" (live)
4. "Drive" (live)

European CD single

1. "Wish You Were Here"
2. "Drive" (live)

European CD EP

1. "Wish You Were Here"
2. "Mexico" (live)
3. "Drive" (live)
4. "The Warmth" (live)
5. "Wish You Were Here" (live)

UK CD single

1. "Wish You Were Here" (live)
2. "The Warmth" (live)
3. "Mexico" (live)

UK DVD single

1. "Wish You Were Here" (video—live at The Morning View Sessions)
2. "Wish You Were Here" (audio)
3. "A Certain Shade of Green" (audio)
4. "A Certain Shade of Green" (video)
5. "Pardon Me" (video)
6. "Stellar" (video)
7. "Take Me to Your Leader" (video)

== Charts ==
=== Weekly charts ===
Weekly chart performance for "Wish You Were Here"
Chart (2001–2002)	Peak position
Australia (ARIA)	39
Canada Radio (Nielsen BDS)	20
Italy (FIMI)	34
New Zealand (Recorded Music NZ)	45
Portugal (AFP)	8
Scottish Singles Sales (Official Charts)	35
UK Singles (Official Charts)	27
UK Rock & Metal (Official Charts)	2
US Billboard Hot 100	60
US Adult Pop Airplay (Billboard)	36
US Alternative Airplay (Billboard)	2
US Mainstream Rock (Billboard)	4

=== Year-end charts ===
2001 year-end chart performance for "Wish You Were Here"
Chart (2001)	Position
US Mainstream Rock Tracks (Billboard)	27
US Modern Rock Tracks (Billboard)	20

2002 year-end chart performance for "Wish You Were Here"
Chart (2002)	Position
US Modern Rock Tracks (Billboard)	15

=== Decade-end charts ===
Decade-end chart performance for "Wish You Were Here"
Chart (2000–2009)	Position
US Hot Alternative Songs (Billboard)	11
US Hot Rock Songs (Billboard)	16

== Certifications ==
Certifications and sales for "Wish You Were Here"
Region	Certification	Certified units/sales
New Zealand (RMNZ)	Platinum	30,000^{‡}
United Kingdom (BPI)	Silver	200,000^{‡}
^{‡} Sales+streaming figures based on certification alone.

== Release history ==
Release dates and formats for "Wish You Were Here"
Region	Date	Format(s)	Label(s)	Ref.
United States	August 14, 2001	Active rock; alternative radio	Epic; Immortal	
Australia	November 19, 2001	CD	Epic; Immortal	
United Kingdom	January 21, 2002	CD; DVD	Epic; Immortal	

== Cover versions ==
- In 2015, Lower Than Atlantis released a cover of the song on the 2015 reissue of their self-titled album.
