= Incubus (band) =

American rock band

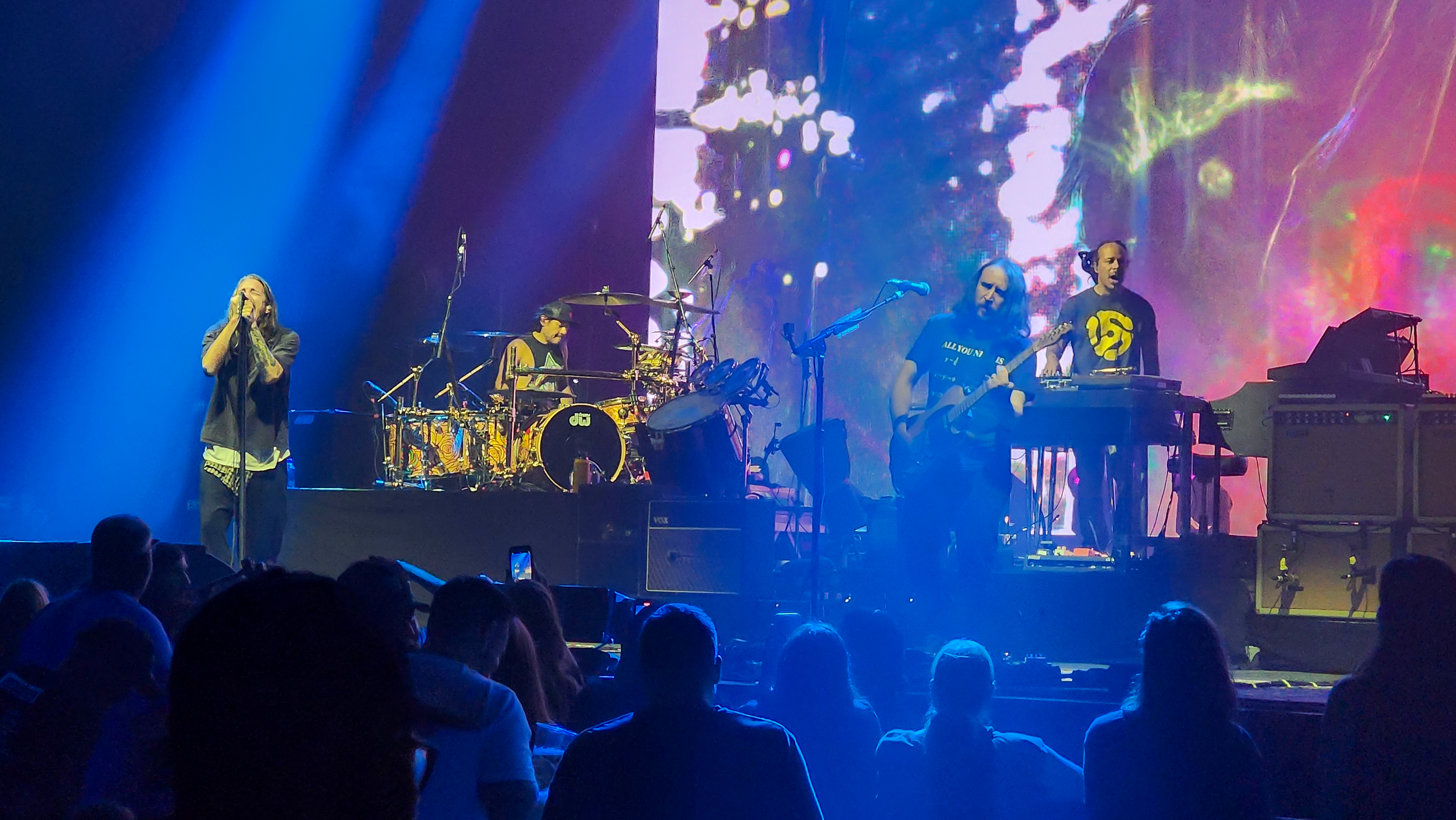
- Incubus performing in 2023

Background information
- Origin: Calabasas, California, U.S.
- Genres: Alternative rock; pop rock; alternative metal; funk metal (early); nu metal (early)
- Works: Discography
- Years active: 1991–present
- Labels: Island; Epic; Immortal; WEG; Virgin
- Members: Brandon Boyd; Mike Einziger; José Pasillas; Chris Kilmore; Nicole Row
- Past members: Dirk Lance; Gavin Koppel; Ben Kenney
- Website: incubushq.com

Incubus is an American rock band from Calabasas, California. The band was formed in 1991 by vocalist Brandon Boyd, lead guitarist Mike Einziger, and drummer José Pasillas while enrolled in Calabasas High School and later expanded to include bassist Alex "Dirk Lance" Katunich, and Gavin "DJ Lyfe" Koppel; the latter two were eventually replaced by bassist Ben Kenney and DJ Kilmore, respectively. Nicole Row replaced Kenney in 2024.

After their first two albums, Fungus Amongus (1995) and S.C.I.E.N.C.E. (1997), Incubus earned mainstream recognition with the release of their 1999 album Make Yourself which spawned several hits, including the US Top 10 hit "Drive", and was certified double platinum in the US. Success continued with the albums Morning View (2001) and A Crow Left of the Murder... (2004), which both debuted at number 2 on the US Billboard 200. Their sixth studio album, Light Grenades (2006), was their first to debut at number 1 in the US. In 2009, Incubus released their first greatest hits album Monuments and Melodies. Two years later, they released their seventh studio album If Not Now, When?., which debuted at number 2 in the US. The band also released an EP, Trust Fall (Side A), in early 2015, and two years later, the band released their eighth studio album, titled 8, on April 21, 2017. A second EP, Trust Fall (Side B), was released on April 17, 2020.

As of October 2022, Incubus has generated 12.4 million U.S. album consumption units and over 23 million records worldwide. The band has received numerous award nominations, including nominations from the Billboard Music Awards, the American Music Awards, and the Grammy Awards.

== History ==
=== Formation, Fungus Amongus and Enjoy Incubus (1991–1996) ===
Incubus was formed in 1991 by vocalist Brandon Boyd, guitarist Mike Einziger, bassist Dirk Lance and drummer José Pasillas, while the members were in high school. They existed as a band for some time before they gave themselves a name, having only chosen the band's name "Incubus" when required to supply a band name for an upcoming show. The band's early shows were frequently at nightclubs on Los Angeles's Sunset Strip, including such well-known venues as the Whisky a Go Go, the Roxy and the Troubadour. Early on the members of Incubus bonded over Phish and Primus and used their grassroots approach as a model for their career.

Incubus produced many of their early recordings with Jim Wirt and Chillum Records in the Santa Monica studio 4th Street Recording, only able to work on their music during hours in which they were not in school. In 1994, they recorded their first two-song EP, Let Me Tell Ya 'Bout Root Beer. This was later followed by the debut album Fungus Amongus, also recorded with Wirt and released on Incubus's own label Stopuglynailfungus Music. Incubus then added Gavin Koppel (known by his stage name DJ Lyfe) to the band. In the following year, Incubus signed a seven-record deal with Sony's Immortal Records, later to become Epic Records. The group was spotted by Epic/Immortal A&R Paul Pontius, who was also responsible for signing Korn to the label. The 1997 six-track EP Enjoy Incubus was the band's first major-label release and was created so the band could present a recording while touring with Korn in Europe.

=== S.C.I.E.N.C.E. (1997–1998) ===
S.C.I.E.N.C.E., Incubus's second studio album, was released on September 9, 1997. After their album release, they started opening for bands such as Korn and 311. This album marked a stylistic departure from the band's early material, featuring heavy guitar riffs, slap bass and turntables to create their most nu metal album. In February 1998, Incubus dismissed Koppel (DJ Lyfe). The group's attorney recommended Chris Kilmore (DJ Kilmore) to fill the position after seeing Chris on the Sunset Strip performing with Beats and Blunts. The band enjoyed Kilmore's style and attitude towards life and asked him to join the band. Incubus participated in the Ozzfest and Family Values metal festivals and toured with System of a Down and Ultraspank during the fall.

"You Will Be a Hot Dancer" (1995)
30 second sample of the Fungus Amongus track "You Will Be a Hot Dancer". This demonstrates the band's very early funk-based sound, which was heavily inspired by groups such as Red Hot Chili Peppers, Primus, and Mr. Bungle.

"Calgone" (1997)
30 second sample of the S.C.I.E.N.C.E track "Calgone". This album is noted for having a more aggressive nu metal sound.

=== Make Yourself (1999–2000) ===
After constant touring throughout 1998, and after selling over 100,000 copies of S.C.I.E.N.C.E. without the support of radio or television exposure, Incubus took a break for two years and then began working on their third album Make Yourself. After just two weeks in the studio with producer Jim Wirt, the band was unhappy with the recordings and opted to continue recording without a producer. After another three weeks of recording, R.E.M./Nirvana producer Scott Litt took an interest in their songs and started taking part in the recording sessions, mainly focusing on songs like "Drive" and "Stellar". According to the band, Litt's involvement in the record came mostly during the mixing process.

Make Yourself was released on October 26, 1999. The album marked the beginning of a more commercially acceptable pop rock and alternative rock sound for the band, although several songs from the album still included elements of nu/alternative metal, such as downtuned riffs and layers of electronics. Right after their album's release, the band went on tour with Primus and Buckethead, a tour which lasted for the remainder of the year. The first song that kicked off the album, "Privilege", was featured on MTV Sports: Pure Ride for the PlayStation. The band also released the single, "Pardon Me", but it was initially not well received by radio stations. Brandon and Mike decided to perform a live acoustic version of the song at the few radio stations who were showing interest, and this in turn spread the word of the song. Many radio stations began to play the acoustic version, including the influential Los Angeles radio giant KROQ-FM. With sparked interest in the song, radio stations began playing the studio version of "Pardon Me". In response, Incubus made a video for the song and released a six-song EP titled When Incubus Attacks (Vol. 1) on August 22, 2000. The EP contained the acoustic version of "Pardon Me". In its first week, the EP sold nearly 40,000 copies, and peaked at No. 41 on the Billboard 200. To start off 2000, the band headed out on Tour with System of a Down, and Mr. Bungle until March, at which point they embarked on a headline tour in clubs until April.

Due to the success of "Pardon Me", Make Yourself reached Gold certification (500,000 copies sold) in April 2000. Incubus continued to tour overseas, and returned home at the end of May to go on a tour of the United States with longtime friends 311. "Stellar", the next single from the album was soon released, and its video received afternoon airplay on MTV and TRL, becoming a success on the Alternative chart. In July, Incubus were once again on the Ozzfest bill, until the late summer.

The band then took a short break after finishing the Ozzfest 2000 Tour, playing two acoustic shows at Artist Direct Studios. On October 5, 2000, Make Yourself went Platinum (one million copies sold), and shortly after, the band went on tour with Deftones. Sony re-released their independent debut album Fungus Amongus on November 7, 2000.

On November 14, 2000, the band released "Drive", the third single from Make Yourself. It moved quickly up to the top of the Alternative Charts, eventually hitting the No. 1 spot. The single was a success and helped the band break into the mainstream. The single eventually reached the top ten of the Billboard Hot 100 singles chart.

After a ten-year break from the music business in 2000, thrash metal band Opprobrium (formed in 1986 under the name Incubus) were forced to change their name in order to avoid confusion and a lawsuit.

=== Morning View (2001–2002) ===
The band took a break during the first part of 2001 before heading to a beachside mansion in Malibu, California, to record their follow-up album, which would later become known as Morning View.

They began touring once more with Hundred Reasons in Europe from June until the first week of July. At this time, the band was invited to play with the Area 1 Festival, which featured Moby, Outkast, the Roots, Paul Oakenfold, Carl Cox, and Nelly Furtado. Also, in July, Make Yourself was certified double-platinum, selling 2 million copies. In August, the band got to play their first shows in Australia and Japan, before returning to the United States to begin their headlining tour with their long-time friends from California, Hoobastank. Meanwhile, the band's video for "Drive" was nominated for an MTV Video Music Award in the category of Best Group Video.

Continuing to tour, Incubus released their first single, "Wish You Were Here", from their upcoming record, Morning View, on August 21, 2001. The single instantly began to climb up the Alternative charts, reaching No. 2 by early September. The music video was released at the end of that month, after being re-cut to make it more viewable in the wake of the 9/11 disaster. The video earned viewings on MTV's TRL, VH1, and MuchMusic. Their follow-up single was "Nice to Know You".

On October 23, 2001, the band released their fourth full-length major label album. The name was taken from the street on which the band's recording studio was situated. Incubus continued to headline dates after its release, and "Wish You Were Here" continued to sit among the top 10 on Billboard's Alternative charts. Morning View debuted on the Billboard Top 200 at the No. 2 spot (266,000 copies were sold in its first week). This was the highest ever placement for Incubus. At the same time, "Wish You Were Here" was at No. 2 on the Alternative Charts, and "Drive" sat at No. 48 on the Hot 100 chart. The band won an award for Billboard's Alternative Single of the Year for "Drive". By December, Morning View was certified platinum, "Wish You Were Here" was No. 4 on Alternative charts, and Morning View was No. 38 on top 200.

On December 11, Incubus released When Incubus Attacks (Vol. 2), a DVD-Video that featured music videos for "Take Me to Your Leader", "A Certain Shade of Green", "Pardon Me", "Stellar", "Drive", "I Miss You", and "Summer Romance (Anti-Gravity Love Song)", live footage, backstage video, and more. Director Bill Draheim documented the making of "Drive". Save Me from my Half-Life Drive is the result of that edited EPK footage.

To begin 2002, Incubus was No. 9 with "Drive", No. 12 with "Stellar", No. 20 with "Wish You Were Here", No. 75 with "Nice to Know You" and No. 31 with the album Morning View. On January 24, 2002, MTV's TRL premiered the "Nice to Know You" video, and Boyd called in from Europe where the band was on tour with 311 and Hoobastank. The band was then featured on MTV's Becoming, TRL, The Tonight Show with Jay Leno, and played the Late Show with David Letterman on February 14, 2002, all before heading off to play dates in Japan and Australia for the remainder of February and March. While in Sydney, the band shot the video for their next single, "Warning", from March 7 until March 11. The band then released the DVD The Morning View Sessions on May 28, shortly before playing the Weenie Roast on June 8 for KROQ.

Incubus issued a limited-edition version of Morning View on October 1 to coincide with their fall headlining tour. The new version of the album contained a DVD dubbed the "Morning After View Session". It featured the UK video for the group's track "Are You In?", tour footage, new artwork, behind-the-scenes material, and more. Incubus's last performance in 2002 (on November 1) brought several eras for the band to a close. Their last show of the tour would be their last show touring behind 2001's Morning View, as the band looked on to playing new music. The show would also prove to be their last with bass player Dirk Lance, who left the band due to personal differences.

Lance was quietly replaced by former the Roots guitarist Ben Kenney, who began working with Einziger on new songs for a psychedelic jazz-funk project called Time-Lapse Consortium. Incubus ended the year on the charts, having "Wish You Were Here" (No. 10), "Warning" (No. 16), and "Nice to Know You" (No. 26) on the alternative rock format chart, joining "Wish You Were Here" (No. 25) and "Nice to Know You" (No. 36). Morning View was the 40th-best-selling album of 2002.

=== A Crow Left of the Murder... (2003–2004) ===
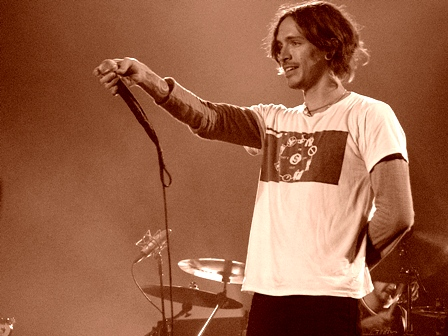
Brandon Boyd in San Sebastián, Spain, in 2004

On January 6, 2003, the band began writing for their next record. The next month, on February 7, the band began to renegotiate their record contract. The band, which had been signed to Epic/Immortal for seven years, cited the fact that state law limits the amount of time that an artist can be bound to a company. The band had been signed to the label for 7 years, and used California's de Havilland Law as a negotiating tool with Epic/Immortal. After releasing three successful albums, the band had been compensated poorly compared to the revenue that they had generated for Sony. The band entered a lawsuit against their label in order to break from their contract, to which Sony responded with a lawsuit of their own. On March 1, Einziger, along with Scott Litt, Dave Holdredge, and Rick Will, was nominated for a Grammy in the "Best Engineered Album (Non Classical)" category, for their work on Morning View. On April 3, after weeks of circulating rumors about Dirk Lance's departure from the band, an official announcement was made by the band. A decision had been reached amongst members of Incubus in a face-to-face meeting at the end of the Morning View tour to discuss his involvement in the band. The band said that the split had become necessary due to "irreconcilable creative differences". Almost immediately after the announcement of a new bass player, the 2003 Incubus vs. Sony case had been settled. The two sides settled on a new contract that delivers three albums to Epic/Immortal with an option on a fourth. The first album would be worth $8 million in advances to the band, with another $2.5 million for each one thereafter.

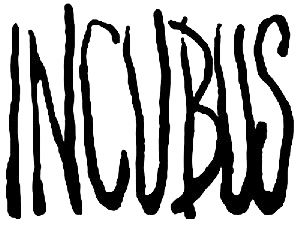
The Incubus logo from the A Crow Left of the Murder... era

By December the new album, which was recorded at Southern Tracks Recording Studios in Atlanta, Georgia was recorded live, opposed to recording each instrument at separate times, and was produced by Brendan O'Brien (Pearl Jam, Soundgarden, Rage Against the Machine, Stone Temple Pilots) was completed and scheduled for release. Titled A Crow Left of the Murder..., the album was to be an enhanced CD with behind-the-scenes video. In the videos, Einziger and Boyd discussed their new songs. Einziger described them as "like the old shit, but older. It's very different. It's very energetic and fast, and a lot of it is more technical. I guess maybe in the vein of more of our older songs; they don't sound like our older songs. They are more exploratory." It was the last Incubus album to be labelled as "alternative metal" by the media, with subsequent albums from the band diverting even further from this sound. On December 15, 2003, the first single, "Megalomaniac", was released. It raised controversy when it was said to be an attack on the Bush administration, and was banned from daytime view on MTV (despite the band saying that it was not an attack on a particular person, rather a comment on some people's negative attitudes). However, the band was actually pleased with this nighttime viewing restriction. Says Boyd, "When we heard our video had been relegated to late night rotation, I think that all of us were secretly like, 'Yes!' ". Pasillas reflected Boyd's sentiments, saying, "I think it's okay if people think that we're trying to make a political statement. Whatever anyone conjures up or takes from our music is good; I mean, our point is to get people thinking."

A Crow Left of the Murder... was released in 2004, showcasing a new turn for the band. The second single released was "Talk Shows on Mute", featuring a video that was inspired by George Orwell's Animal Farm.

Incubus toured worldwide in 2004 with many bands, including Ben Kweller, the Walkmen, Hundred Reasons, the Music, Brand New and Sparta, to promote their new album after their original support act the Vines pulled out due to exhaustion. One song left off the album, the 27-minute-long instrumental entitled "The Odyssey", was later featured on soundtrack for the video game, Halo 2.

In November 2004, the band released a live DVD entitled Alive at Red Rocks, filmed in Red Rocks Park, Colorado, during their world tour for A Crow Left of the Murder.... Along with the DVD came a bonus CD featuring five tracks, including a studio version of live favorite "Pantomime", "Follow" (a lyrical version, different from the First Movement of the Odyssey version), and the UK B-side "Monuments and Melodies". Two live tracks were also included. The performance was also sold in high definition via Blu-ray Disc. A high definition version of the entire song "Pardon Me" is also available for free download from the PlayStation Store, an online service for PlayStation 3 users.

In December 2004, at a gig in Los Angeles the band played the Police hits "De Do Do Do, De Da Da Da", "Message in a Bottle" and "Roxanne" with Stewart Copeland and Andy Summers from the former band.

=== Light Grenades (2005–2008) ===
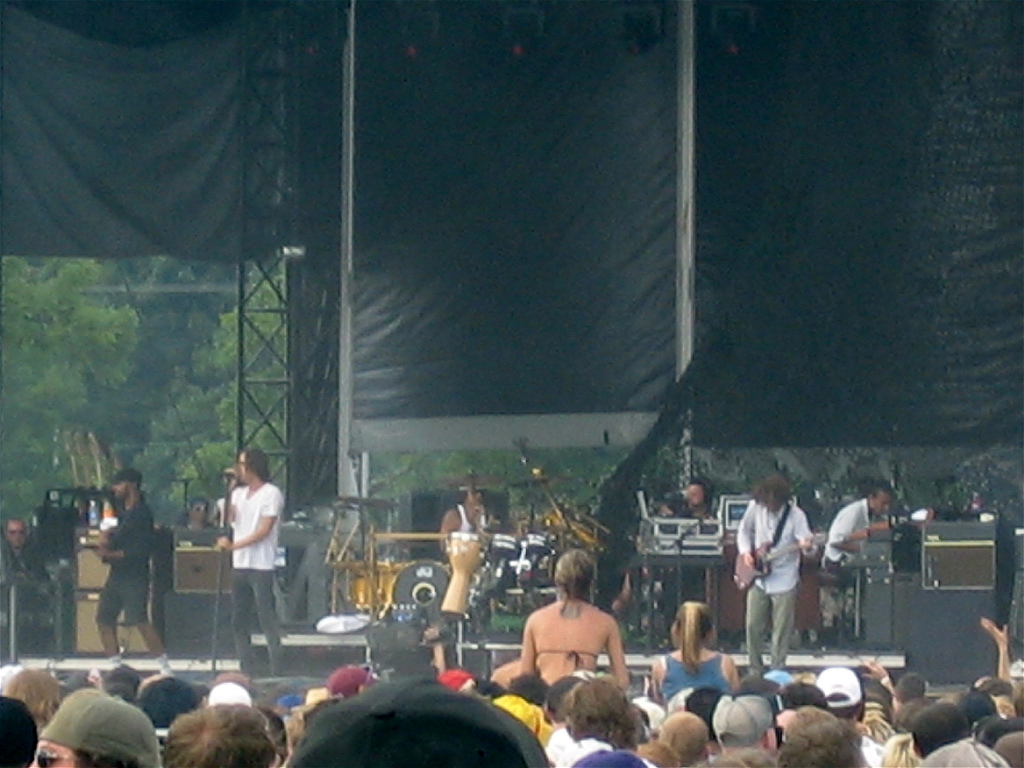
Incubus performing at the Virgin Festival in Baltimore in 2007

In the spring of 2005, the band went back into the studio with Brendan O'Brien. Three new songs were released in late July 2005 as part of the soundtrack album to the Sony film Stealth. The track "Make a Move", was released to radio in late May, and song reached No. 17 (Alternative Charts) and No. 19 (Mainstream Rock Charts). Fan reaction towards "Make a Move" was lukewarm, but the other two new songs, "Admiration" and "Neither of Us Can See" (a duet with Chrissie Hynde), seemed to be much more well-liked. In January 2006, the first of a series of Incubus podcasts was released by the band via internet. Among other things, the podcast featured the band's thoughts about their 2005 South American tour, some information on their new album, a mash-up of "Drive" and Tupac Shakur's "Better Dayz", a cover of Soundgarden's "Black Hole Sun", and a few live interludes.

On August 1, 2006, the band announced that album number six, Light Grenades, was soon to be released and that it was being produced by Brendan O'Brien. A few weeks afterward, the release date was confirmed to be Tuesday, November 28. Upon release, Light Grenades debuted No. 1 on the Billboard 200, the first time Incubus has ever sat atop the album charts, despite only selling 165,000 copies (their lowest debut for an album since Make Yourself) in the first week.

In November, Incubus played two exclusive European shows in Berlin and London. These were both in less than 2,000-capacity venues—a special occasion for the band and the fans (due to Incubus's mainstream success, the band now usually plays at large arenas worldwide). The band used these shows to showcase new material from Light Grenades. The band's first single, "Anna Molly", had a music video which had mainstream success.

On December 27, 2006, Incubus launched the "I Dig Incubus" contest, in which participants cut together clips of the band performing their single "Dig", to form a complete music video. On February 1, 2007, five finalists were announced for the "I Dig Incubus" contest. In a video interview on Blender, bassist and vocalist Ben Kenney said, "It's almost something that will happen whether or not we want to do it. People will make their own videos for songs. It's kind of a cool way for us to get together with fans out there who are artistic." On August 4, 2007, Incubus played on the first day at Baltimore's Virgin Festival along with bands such as the Police and Beastie Boys.

Michael Einziger had been suffering from carpal tunnel syndrome and although he had an operation that has corrected the problem, he needed to recuperate for a few months, hence recent tour plans were postponed. Incubus apologized to fans and continued the tour in the summer and autumn.

In February and March 2008, Incubus hit the road again starting in New Zealand and headlining the Soundwave festival in Australia alongside the Offspring and Alexisonfire, and toured Asia performing to sell-out crowds. In Singapore, they met fans at a Meet and Greet session at Changi Airport and performed at Fort Canning Hill. In April, Incubus performed at the Festival Imperial in Costa Rica, along with the bands the Smashing Pumpkins and Duran Duran, and later in Venezuela at the Poliedro de Caracas. Incubus also performed a number of shows throughout Europe this summer including the Rock am Ring and Rock im Park Festivals in Germany, the Nova Rock Festival in Austria, Pinkpop Festival in the Netherlands and the Download Festival in England. In July 2008, the band played in a VH1 tribute to the Who alongside Foo Fighters, Pearl Jam and the Flaming Lips.

=== Hiatus and greatest hits album (2009–2010) ===
In April 2008 the band took a break from touring and recording while its members concentrated on school, family and other activities. Brandon Boyd enrolled in a university art program in Los Angeles, while guitarist Mike Einziger went to Harvard music school to study composition. Drummer José Pasillas was also "having a baby, so there's a lot of normal life stuff going on right now—school, babies, mortgages," Boyd said. "I'm of the mind to say it wouldn't be a bad thing to disappear for a year or two years," he said. "A lot of people would say culture moves too fast and you need to remind people, but I would argue there's not any rush."

In mid January 2009, Incubus posted a video to their official site, describing what each band member was occupied with in the form of letters to each other. The resolution of the video was that the band was planning on getting back together soon, excited to create new music with their diverse experiences over their respite.

On March 11, 2009, Incubus posted an update to their official site detailing the new greatest hits album, Monuments and Melodies. The first single for the album was "Black Heart Inertia", released on April 7, 2009, with the album coming two months later on June 16, 2009. Disc one of the album included new singles "Black Heart Inertia" and "Midnight Swim" as well as the top radio hits of the last decade. Then disc two of the album contains songs that have not been released officially on an album, or were rejected demos on prior albums, as well as an acoustic version of "A Certain Shade of Green", and a cover of the Prince song "Let's Go Crazy". The band also announced many confirmed dates for a Summer Amphitheater Tour of the US.

On April 1, 2009, the band posted a fake "making of" video that was filmed on the set of "Black Heart Inertia". In the video, Brandon and his double "swapped places". Brandon fetched coffee for his double, and his double also imitated Christian Bale when the DP annoyed him, shouting at and violently chasing him out off of the set. After the short film, the first full stream of "Black Heart Inertia" was uploaded, clocking in at 4:17. On April 2, the full song was streamed on the band's official site. The song peaked at No. 7 on the Alternative Songs chart.

On June 16, 2009, Monuments and Melodies was released to the public, and opened at No. 5 on the Billboard 200. Monuments and Melodies was the band's fourth album to reach the top 5 on the Billboard 200. The next month, on July 1, 2009, Boyd stated to North County Times, "We are definitely going to be writing ... in hopes of putting out a record sometime in 2010. That's the hope. We can never force anything. I definitely have the suspicion that we're going to get on the road together this summer, and we're just going to start playing and stuff is going to start brewing, and we're going to light that fire again."

In January 2010, it was revealed that former turntablist Gavin "DJ Lyfe" Koppel threatened current turntablist Chris Kilmore in a store on December 28, 2009. Kilmore, who replaced Koppel in 1998, claimed that Koppel "asked me to fight him right there and raised his fists to me." As result of the incident, a judge granted a new restraining order against Koppel. Kilmore also had a previous restraining order issued against Koppel in 2003 after Koppel allegedly spat in his face.

=== If Not Now, When? (2011–2013) ===
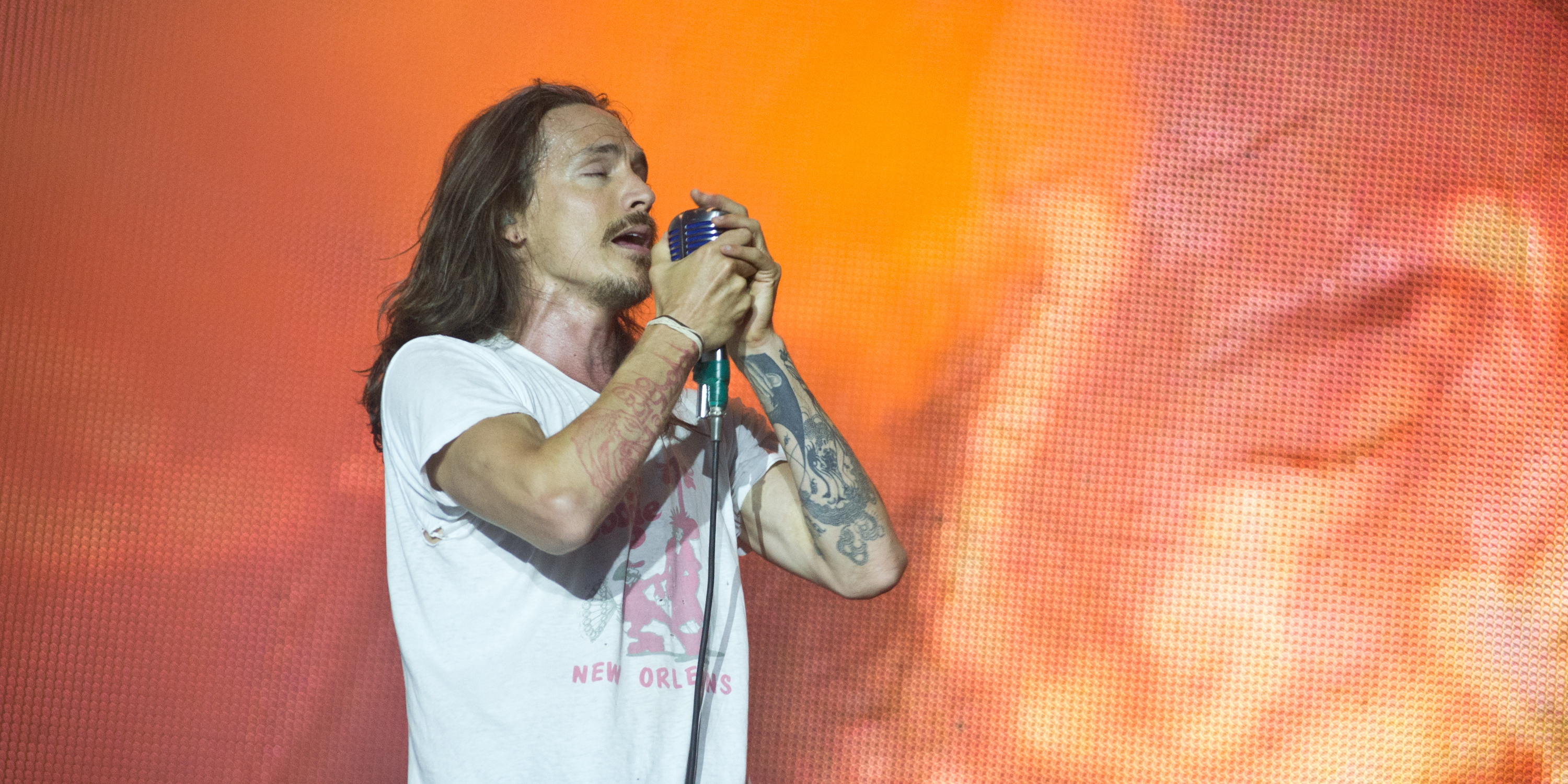
Brandon Boyd live in 2012

After the release of Boyd's first solo album, The Wild Trapeze on July 6, 2010, it was announced that Incubus would head back into the studio to begin writing and recording a new studio album, to be released on July 12. The band played a handful of South American tour dates in October 2010, also debuting the song "Surface to Air".

Incubus announced in March 2011 that the new album was complete and would be released in "August or September" according to Brandon Boyd. Boyd also stated that "this new record is different from anything that we've done."

On April 2, 2011, band manager Steve Rennie confirmed that their next album had been named If Not Now, When?. It was released on July 12, 2011. The album's lead single is "Adolescents" and it was posted on the band's website on April 4, 2011.

On April 28, 2011, Incubus premiered the video for "Adolescents" and also released a video with behind the scenes footage.

The band revealed that they would tour for 18 months following the release of the record.

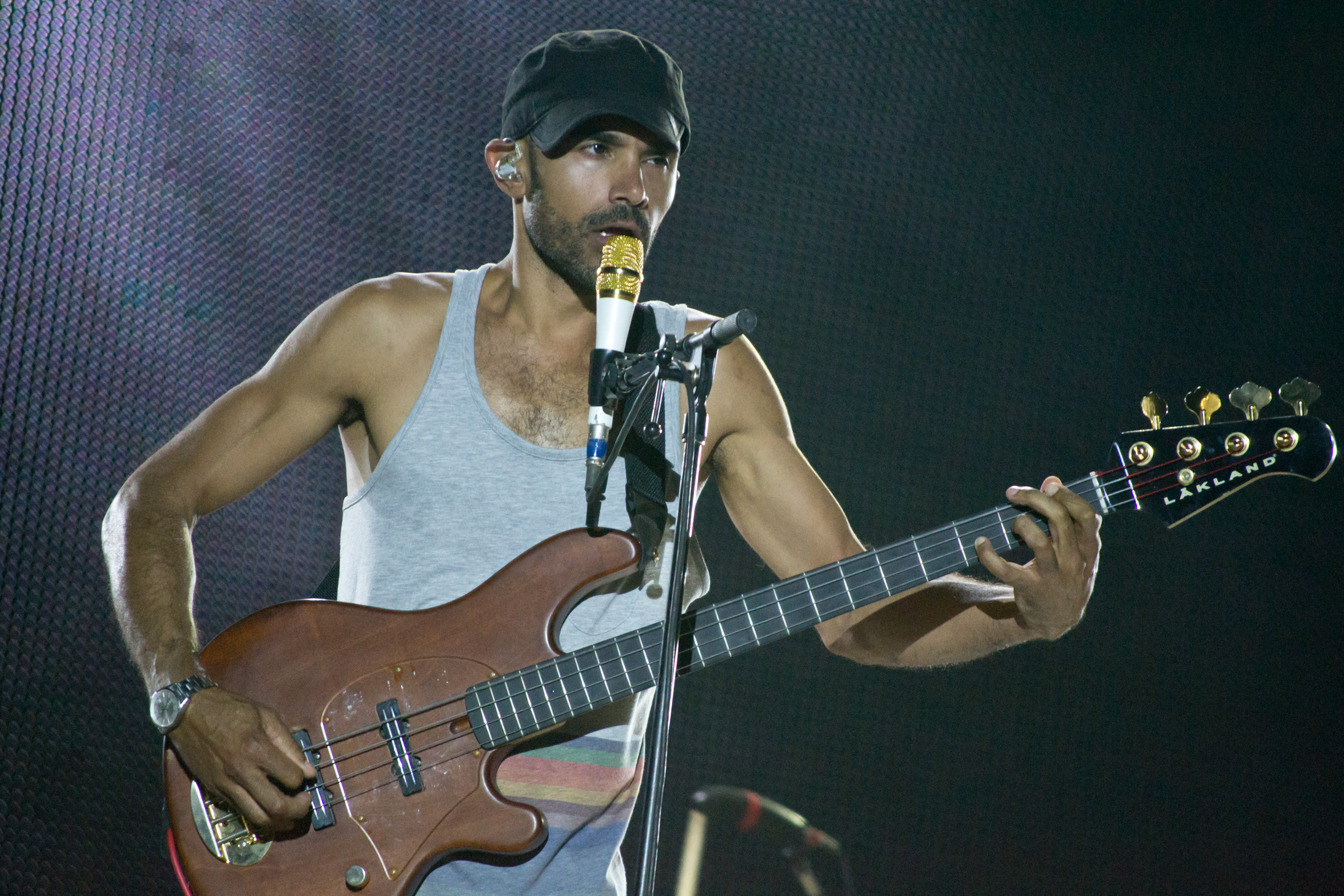
Ben Kenney live in Rock in Rio Madrid 2012

To promote the release of If Not Now, When?, the band took part in a participatory media exhibit and real-time documentary called Incubus HQ Live that allowed unprecedented fan access and interaction. Footage, music and art from the seven-day event became available as a special edition box set in July 2012.

Mike has said that he is writing music for an orchestral project and also for Incubus. He states in a video (Mikey Gear Tour part II), "My hope is to just write lots of music and then by the time we get to the point to where we're going to finish the tour I'll have a lot of music written and then people won't have to wait five more years for another album (laughs)."

The band joined Linkin Park as co-headliners on the 2012 edition of the Honda Civic Tour. Incubus hinted that they would go on hiatus following the end of the 2012 Honda Civic Tour, but their manager stated that Incubus would only take a break after the tour, not a hiatus.

In October 2012, the band released their second compilation album. The album, entitled The Essential Incubus, included songs spanning the band's major label career, from 1997's Enjoy Incubus EP to 2011's If Not Now, When?.

In August 2013, the band announced a South American tour to take place later that year. Later that year, the band was featured in an NME article titled "28 Nu-Metal Era Bands You Probably Forgot All About".

=== Trust Fall (Side A) (2014–2015) ===
In a radio interview while on the road with his solo band Sons of the Sea, Brandon Boyd announced that fans can expect some new Incubus music in 2015, followed by a tour. Mike Einziger also reinforced this statement when asked on his Twitter page.

In August 2014, Einziger posted a picture of the band on his Instagram in a studio, alluding to the fact they were in the process of creating their album. Subsequently, a few days following the images of the band in a studio, they announced they would be attending the 2015 Soundwave music festival in Australia, alongside Faith No More and Soundgarden. They played at the KROQ's Almost Acoustic Christmas 2014 on December 14, their first full band appearance since December 2013. During their performance they debuted a new song called "Trust Fall". Incubus announced they will release two EP's in 2015 with the first, Trust Fall (Side A) set for release on May 12, 2015, having been delayed from March 24, 2015. The first single, "Absolution Calling", was released February 5, 2015, to be followed by the second single, "Trust Fall", on March 10, 2015.

They performed at Australia's Soundwave festival and two other concerts in Australia. In March 2015, they toured Japan, Hawaii and "Festival Cumbre Tajín" in Mexico. They headlined the DC101 Kerfuffle on May 4, 2015. In May and June 2015, they will play at two festivals in Germany ("Rockavaria" and "Grüne Hölle"), one concert in Milan and at Donauinselfest in Vienna. They will also be in London's Hammersmith Apollo on the June 16, 2015. Incubus also announced a joint 2015 North American Summer Tour with Deftones. Support will be provided by Death from Above 1979 for most concerts of the tour. The tour began on July 22, 2015, in Clarkston, Michigan, at the DTE Energy Music Theatre and with the final concert of the tour occurring on August 30, 2015, in Chula Vista, California, at the Sleep Train Amphitheatre.

=== 8 (2016–2018) ===
The band reconvened in 2016 to work on their eighth full-length studio album. On February 16, 2017, the lead single "Nimble Bastard" was released, and it was announced that the new album would be titled 8, with a projected April 21 release date, with Skrillex contributing to the production and mixing of the album. A summer 2017 tour was announced with Jimmy Eat World and Judah & the Lion supporting, and was followed by a world tour across several continents including South America, Asia, and Europe.

=== Trust Fall (Side B), departure of Ben Kenney, Morning View XXIII, and upcoming ninth studio album (2019–present) ===
The band announced via its Twitter page that a new single titled "Into the Summer" would be released on August 23, 2019. The release of the single coincides with a US tour, to mark the 20th anniversary of Make Yourself. In an interview with Loudwire on October 20, 2019, bassist Ben Kenney confirmed the band had completely finished four new songs and were working on more, but didn't confirm whether these songs would be released in the form of a new studio album or if they would be released as individual songs. On the matter he said "We don't want to get stacked up in a studio making an album. We have to adapt our process 'cause the albums themselves don't actually make as big a splash as they used to. We're just trying to experiment and explore what we're capable of doing, and all the while not take ourselves too seriously and just really enjoy what we get to do." On January 1, 2020, singer Brandon Boyd announced their next single, "Our Love" will be released on January 31, 2020. The band were scheduled to tour the UK and other European destinations in 2020 but were forced to cancel their shows due to the COVID-19 pandemic.

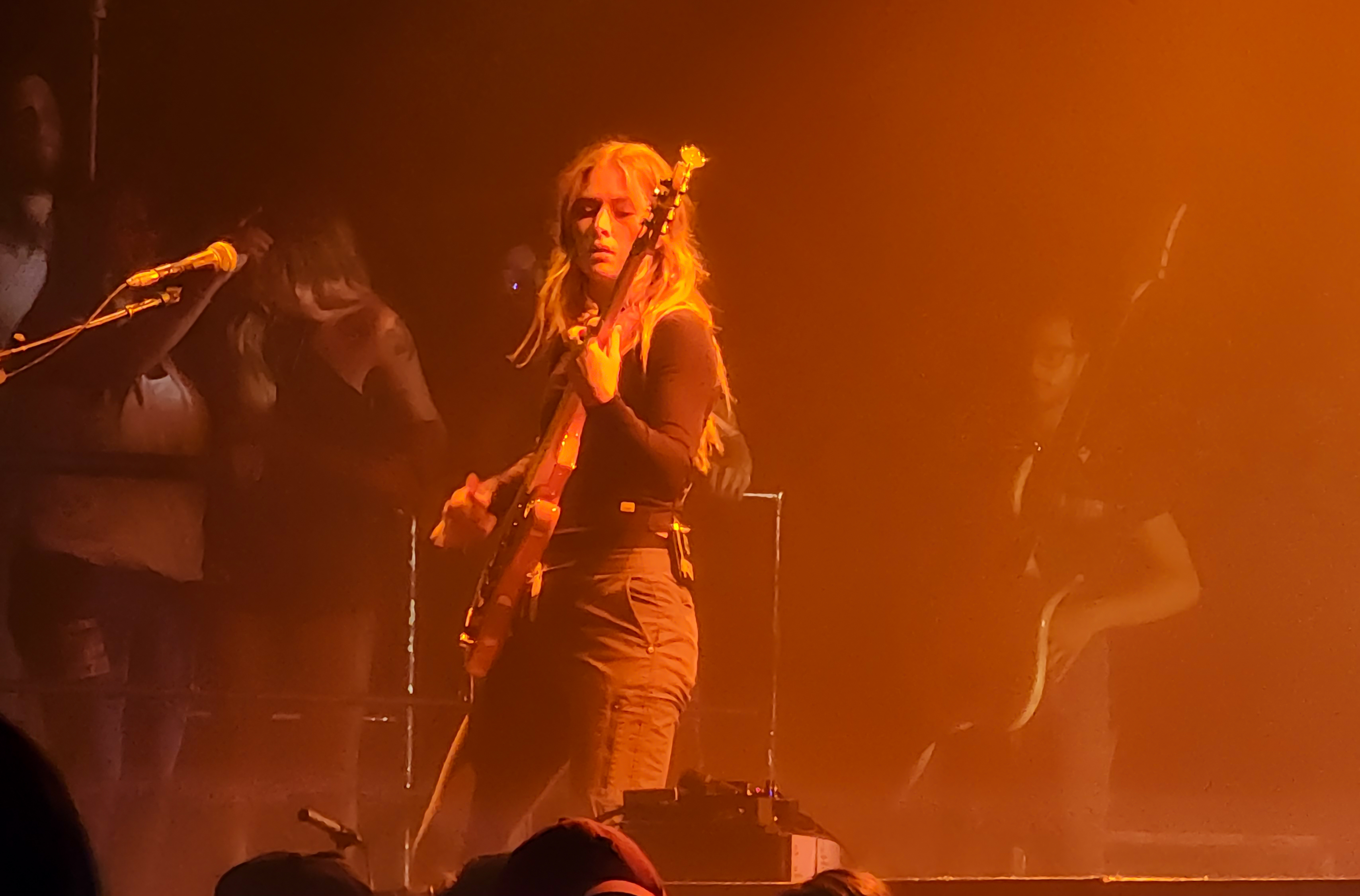
Nicole Row joined on bass in 2023.

The band returned to touring in 2023; Kenney was forced to sit out the 2023 touring cycle after having surgery to remove a brain tumor; Tal Wilkenfeld took over bass duties until March, and Nicole Row from March onwards. On August 5, the band announced the release of Morning View XXIII, a complete rerecording of their 2001 album set for release on October 6 (postponed to early 2024) by Virgin Music. They simultaneously announced a concert at the Hollywood Bowl where they would perform Morning View in full, supported by Paris Jackson and Action Bronson, for the same day.

On February 6, 2024, Brandon Boyd revealed via a Rolling Stone interview that while Ben Kenney had recovered, the bassist had decided to leave Incubus and that his tour replacement, Nicole Row, was now officially a member of the band. By that point Row had already played on the Morning View XXIII re-recording and was working with them on material for a new Incubus album.

In 2025, the band signed to Velvet Hammer Music and Management Group.

== Artistry ==
=== Musical style ===
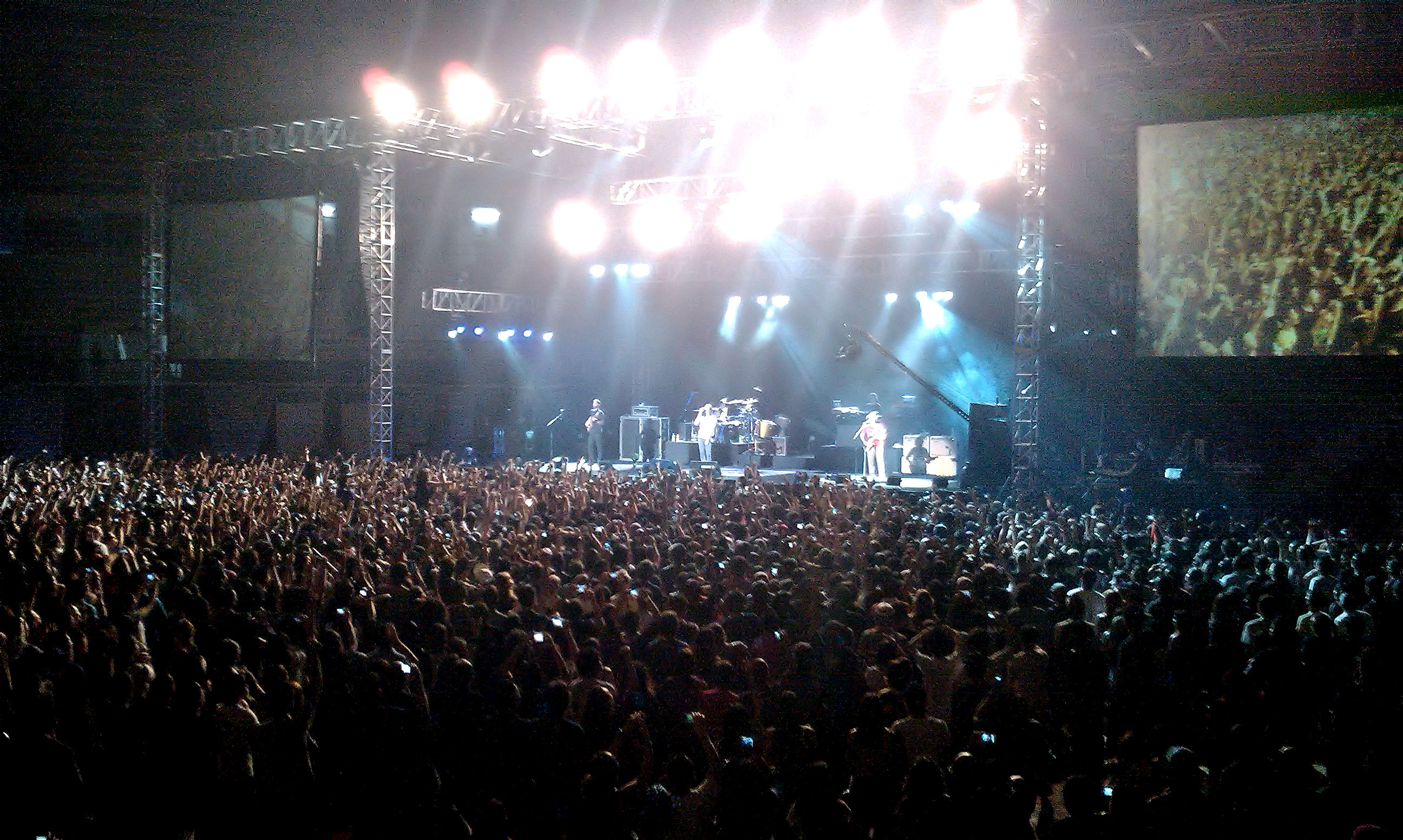
Incubus concert in Stadium Negara in Kuala Lumpur, Malaysia, on July 23, 2011

Las Vegas Weekly said that Incubus was a "funky, jazzy, experimental rock band, incorporating elements of hip-hop into its music before it was fashionable to do so." According to AllMusic, the band became "one of the most popular alt-metal bands of the new millennium" by combining heavy metal, funk, jazz, hip-hop, techno, post-grunge, rap metal and alternative rock into a "versatile blend". The Age wrote that Incubus "emerged bearing influences of pop, alternative metal and hip-hop, unusual for mainstream rock bands". Indianapolis Monthly said that the band was "part metal, part funk, part jazz and part hip-hop". The McClatchy-Tribune News called Incubus a "spacey, experimental alternative-rock band". Rolling Stone said that the band were latecomers to "the great funk metal scare of the '90s". The Los Angeles Times similarly wrote in 2004 that "Incubus always stood out from the rest of the mid-'90s alt-metal crowd, its positive lyrical approach and musical versatility far richer than the overworked wallowing in misery of such acts as Korn and later arrival Staind."

Prior to finding mainstream success in the early 2000s, Incubus was often grouped in with nu metal, alongside other Californian bands such as Korn and Deftones. NME described Incubus as a "fusion-generated funk/nu-metal band". Maui Time Weekly wrote, "Incubus was one of the few nu metal bands to survive the purge of the millennium, and they did it through consistent hard work–the band is constantly either in the studio or on tour–and musical development. There are still elements of nu metal in the music the band makes today as they still have a DJ. But in retrospect, Incubus treated that genre like the fad it was, more an indication of that specific time in music, not as the character of the musicians." When asked about his thoughts on the scene in a 2013 interview, Brandon Boyd reflected "Something I know that separated us from nu-metal was a lot of those bands had misogynist lyrics, and we never wrote stuff like that. I never wrote lyrics like that. I guess there were similarities in some of my musical and vocal stylings, but then we came off tour for S.C.I.E.N.C.E. around early '99, and wrote Make Yourself, which was a vastly different album but we were still the same band. We don't try and create any kind of album really. I don't attempt to write any kind of music, this is just what comes out." He also told Kerrang: "It felt a little strange to be associated with some of the bands around that time who were very deeply misogynistic in their content and vibrationally kind of violent. So for years it hurt our feelings that we were associated with so many of these bands who we felt we had no relationship with or similarity to." The Chicago Tribune stated in 2001 that Incubus is "Cheerful, melodic and polite, a nu-metal band for people who don't like nu-metal bands" also claiming that Boyd was the genre's "first official pinup boy".

From the mid-2000s, Incubus began to adopt a softer sound, moving from rock towards a "funk-pop-rock" sound. This was particularly apparent by If Not Now, When? (2011), which was described by Rolling Stone as "slick, inert ripples of interchangeable power pop". The Guardian compared the sound of 8 (2017) and its more ballad-like moments to Ed Sheeran. Their 2020 EP Trust Fall (side B) was described by Sputnik music as "inoffensive pop".

=== Influences ===
Guitarist Mike Einziger stated in 2017 that the band's diversity is "our greatest asset and our biggest flaw. We don't fit anywhere and we never have. We were never punk rock enough for the Warped Tour, we were never metal enough for Ozzfest, we were never quite indie rock or cool enough for Lollapalooza. We've carved our own path, and we're really humbled by the fact that we've had so many supporters and people who appreciate our music." The band has also used a wide variety of instruments in their music that are not traditionally associated with use in rock music, including a djembe, sitar, didgeridoo, and bongos on many of their earlier tracks and during live performances, and with the use of a pipa given to the band by rock musician Steve Vai which is played by Einziger in the song "Aqueous Transmission".

Incubus was heavily influenced by the "free-form funk" of Primus. Other influences on the band's sound include Faith No More, Ani DiFranco, Stone Temple Pilots, Soundgarden and Phish. Boyd reflected on the band's initial influences in 2012, stating "At that time [the early '90s] music got turned on its ear. We were listening to bands like Primus, Mr. Bungle, John Zorn, we also got into Soundgarden and Rage Against the Machine. What's amazing is those bands are still good now, they're still relevant now. Alice in Chains, Red Hot Chili Peppers, these bands that were coming of age right when we were growing up, at that most important, kind of pliable time in your youth. We were basically so inspired by music, that we decided to make music on our own." Critics have compared Boyd's style of singing to Faith No More/Mr. Bungle vocalist Mike Patton, whom the band have also credited as a major influence.

== Awards and nominations ==
Award	Year	Nominee(s)	Category	Result
Billboard Music Awards	2000	"Pardon Me"	Modern Rock Track of the Year	Nominated
Billboard Music Awards	2001	Incubus	Modern Rock Artist of the Year	Nominated
Billboard Music Awards	2001	"Drive"	Modern Rock Track of the Year	Won
MTV Video Awards	2001	"Drive"	Best Group Video	Nominated
MuchMusic Video Awards	2001	"Drive"	Best International Video	Nominated
Billboard Music Awards	2002	Incubus	Modern Hard Rock Artist of the Year	Nominated
Teen Choice Awards	2002	"Nice to Know You"	Choice – Rock Track	Nominated
Kerrang! Awards	2002	Incubus	Best International Live Act	Nominated
Teen Choice Awards	2004	2004 World Tour (with The Vines)	Choice Music Tour	Nominated
MuchMusic Video Awards	2004	"Megalomaniac"	Best International Video	Nominated
MTV Video Music Brazil	2004	"Megalomaniac"	Best International Video	Nominated
American Music Awards	2004	Incubus	Favorite Alternative Artist	Nominated
Grammy Awards	2004	"Megalomaniac"	Best Hard Rock Performance	Nominated
MTV Video Music Awards	2004	"Megalomaniac"	Best Visual Effects	Nominated
mtvU Woodie Awards	2004	Incubus	The Welcome Back Woodie (Artist Who Has Achieved Mainstream Success, But Still Remains Popular on Campus	Won
BDS Spin Awards	2007	"Dig"	50,000 Spins	Won

== Band members ==
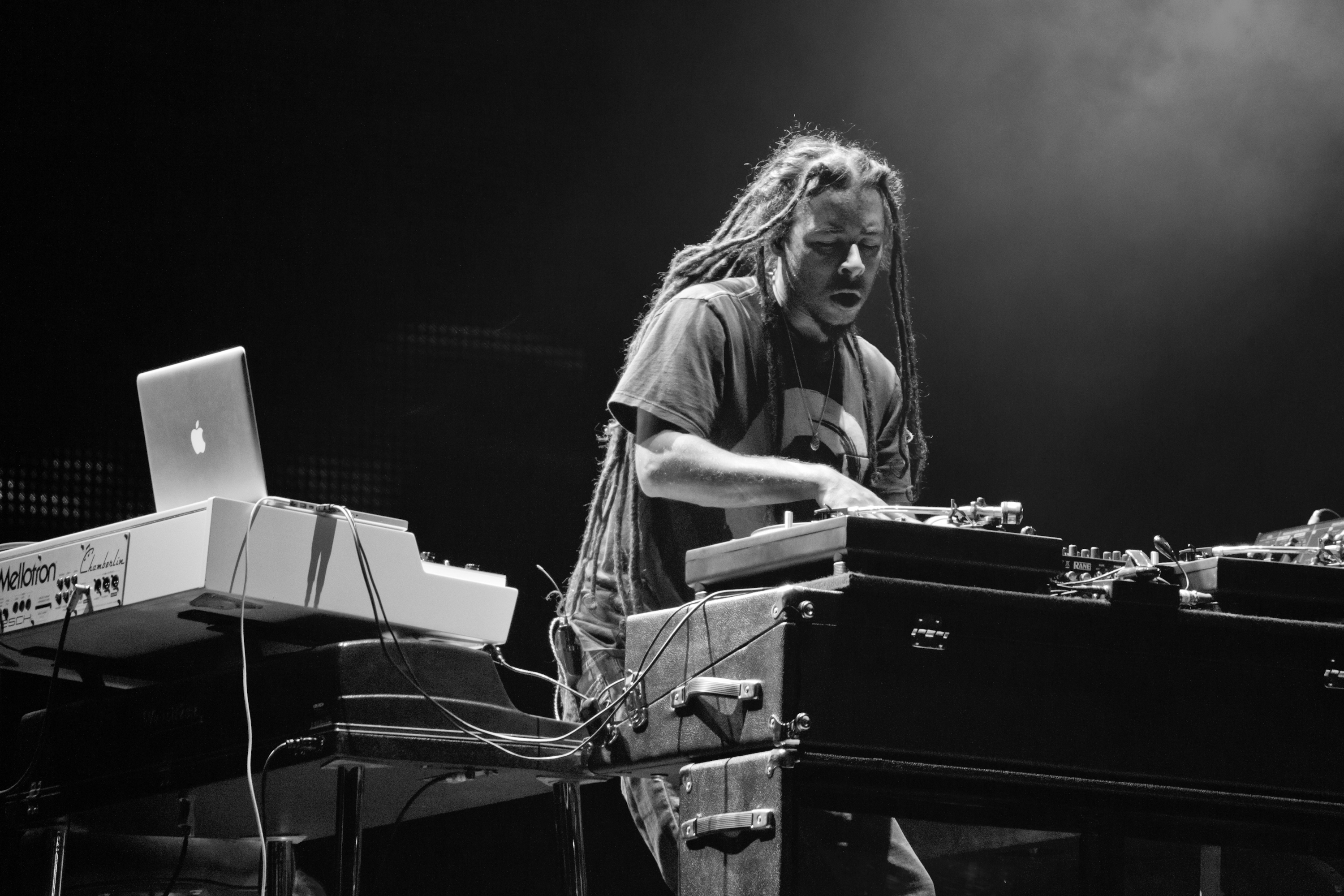
Chris Kilmore in 2012

Current members

- Brandon Boyd – lead vocals, occasional guitar and percussion (1991–present)
- Mike Einziger – guitar, backing vocals, occasional keyboards (1991–present)
- José Pasillas – drums, percussion (1991–present)
- Chris Kilmore – turntables, keyboards, theremin (1998–present)
- Nicole Row – bass, backing vocals, occasional synth bass (2024–present; touring 2023)

Former members

- Alex "Dirk Lance" Katunich – bass (1991–2003)
- Gavin "DJ Lyfe" Koppel – turntables (1995–1998)
- Ben Kenney – bass, backing vocals (2003–2023)

Former touring musicians

- Tal Wilkenfeld – bass, backing vocals (2023)

Timeline

== Discography ==
Studio albums

- Fungus Amongus (1995)
- S.C.I.E.N.C.E. (1997)
- Make Yourself (1999)
- Morning View (2001)
- A Crow Left of the Murder... (2004)
- Light Grenades (2006)
- If Not Now, When? (2011)
- 8 (2017)
- Something in the Water (TBD)
