= Nimble Bastard =

Single by Incubus

from the album 8
- Released: February 17, 2017
- Recorded: 2016
- Genre: Hard rock
- Length: 3:29
- Label: Island
- Songwriters: Brandon Boyd; Michael Einziger; Jose Pasillas II; Chris Kilmore; Ben Kenney

Incubus singles chronology
"Absolution Calling" (2015)	"Nimble Bastard" (2017)	"Into the Summer" (2019)

Music video
- "Nimble Bastard" on YouTube

"Nimble Bastard" is a single by American rock band Incubus, off of their eighth studio album 8. It peaked at number 4 on the Billboard Mainstream Rock Songs chart in April 2017.

== Background ==
Guitarist Mike Einziger mentioned that the song was conceived very late in the album creation process, being written spontaneously while already working on recording sessions in the studio. He reflected that: "we were messing around with this musical idea and the next thing we know we had a song." Lyrics were written by lead vocalist Brandon Boyd. The track was not one of the tracks from the album to be produced by Skrillex, though he did provide the song final mix.

The song was debuted on KROQ on February 16, 2017. The band premiered a lyric video for the track the following day, featuring a film reel that presented the song's lyrics across a number of various backdrops and landscapes, until the reel burns, revealing nothing but a brick wall. A music video for the song was released on April 7, 2017, and featured the band being attacked by dogs with jet packs and, in retaliation, band members transform into super hero cats to fight back.

== Composition and themes ==
Loudwire described the song as "Incubus in a heavier mood", stating the song features "an immediate energy with the full band coming in together right at the start, including the vocals. The slightly subdued introduction gives way to a bobbing energy that crashes into the positively sublime chorus" and concluding that "Soaring hooks dominate 'Nimble Bastard', making it one of the catchiest songs in the band’s discography. Lyrically, Boyd states he wrote the song about people he was inspired by people's adaptability, and ability to recover from negative life situations against difficult odds. However, the lyrics lead many to misinterpret them to be an allegory for the political climate in the United States after the United States Presidential Election of 2016, in which Donald Trump was elected over Hillary Clinton. He clarified the situation, explaining:

In the lyric for 'Nimble Bastard,' I'm in praise of someone. I've known a handful of people in my life who've come into the most horrific circumstances whether it's physical injury or psychological or failure and they'll be as low as you could possibly be and you're like, 'Dude, this guy's done.' And then somehow they pop back up and shake it off and then are more strong and resilient as a result. That is this nimble bastard that I'm in praise of. It could be construed as a political statement in that the left took a massive hit over the past few months so maybe now's the time to learn from those failures... but that's not what I had in mind when I wrote the lyrics.

Radio.com pointed out that similar misconceptions had arisen from the band's 2004 single "Megalomaniac", of which many listeners misinterpreted its lyrics to be about then-president George W. Bush.

== Reception ==
Loudwire named the song the 25th-best hard rock song of 2017.

== Personnel ==
- Brandon Boyd – lead vocals
- Michael Einziger – guitar
- Ben Kenney – bass guitar, backing vocals
- Chris Kilmore – synthesizers
- Jose Pasillas II – drums

== Charts ==
=== Weekly charts ===
Weekly chart performance for "Nimble Bastard"
Chart (2017)	Peak position
US Hot Rock & Alternative Songs (Billboard)	28
US Alternative Airplay (Billboard)	22
US Rock Airplay (Billboard)	16
US Mainstream Rock (Billboard)	4

=== Year-end charts ===
Year-end chart performance for "Nimble Bastard"
Chart (2017)	Position
Iceland (Tónlistinn)	48
US Mainstream Rock (Billboard)	32
