= Alive at Red Rocks =

Video (DVD) by Incubus
- Released: November 23, 2004
- Recorded: July 26, 2004 at Red Rocks, Colorado
- Genre: Alternative rock
- Length: 140 minutes
- Label: Epic / Immortal
- Director: Zane Vella
- Producer: Sara Maier, Steve Rennie, Zane Vella

Incubus chronology
Morning View Sessions (2002)	Alive at Red Rocks (2004)	Look Alive (2007)

Professional ratings
Review scores
Source	Rating
Allmusic	4/5 stars
Classic Rock	4/5 stars

Alive at Red Rocks

EP by Incubus
- Released: November 23, 2004
- Recorded: July 26, 2004 at Red Rocks, Colorado
- Genre: Alternative rock
- Length: 21:56
- Label: Epic / Immortal
- Producer: Brendan O'Brien

Incubus chronology
When Incubus Attacks Volume 1 (2000)	Alive at Red Rocks (2004)	Friends and Lovers: Valentine's Day EP (2012)

Alive at Red Rocks is a live DVD and bonus CD by the American band Incubus. It was recorded in Red Rocks, Colorado on July 26, 2004. It was the first DVD showing new bassist Ben Kenney (Dirk Lance's replacement). It was also the first DVD that featured Mike Einziger using a Fender Rhodes piano, on the performances of "Here in My Room" and "Drive."

The bonus CD included five previously unreleased tracks. One was the popular live song "Pantomime", which was recorded for A Crow Left of the Murder..., but ultimately left off. "Monuments and Melodies", a B-side of the "Megalomaniac" single and Japanese bonus track of A Crow Left of the Murder..., was also released. A new version of the song called "Follow" (the previous version being a movement from The Odyssey, featured on the Halo 2 Original Soundtrack) was included. Finally, there are live performances of the songs "Circles" and "Are You In" on the CD.

== Reception ==
Alex Henderson of AllMusic awarded it four out of five stars, writing that it contains "inspired, gutsy performances of 'Talk Shows on Mute', 'Drive', 'Wish You Were Here', 'Megalomaniac' and other favorites." Henderson added that, "Alive at Red Rocks isn't for the alt-metal/nu metal ideologues who insist that Incubus peaked around 1995-1996, but anyone who admires their more recent output will find a lot to savor on this generally excellent release."

== DVD track listing ==
1. "Megalomaniac"
2. "Nice To Know You"
3. "Idiot Box"
4. "Just A Phase"
5. "Priceless"
6. "Beware! Criminal"
7. "Wish You Were Here"
8. "Here In My Room"
9. "Drive"
10. "Vitamin" (includes "Everything in Ebb," a portion of the "4th Movement of The Odyssey" with lyrics)
11. "Pistola"
12. "Stellar" (includes a portion of "De Do Do Do, De Da Da Da" by The Police)
13. "Made For TV Movie"
14. "Talk Shows on Mute"
15. "Sick Sad Little World"
16. "A Certain Shade of Green" (listed as just "Green" on the DVD)
17. "Pantomime"
18. "The Warmth"
19. "Pardon Me"

== CD track listing ==
1. "Pantomime" (in-studio version) – 3:54
2. "Follow" (vocal version of the first movement of The Odyssey) – 3:35
3. "Monuments and Melodies" – 5:05
4. "Are You In?" (live) – 4:30
5. "Circles" (live) – 4:52

== Personnel ==
=== Incubus ===
- Brandon Boyd – lead vocals, rhythm guitar, percussion
- Michael Einziger – lead guitar, rhodes piano, backing vocals
- Jose Pasillas II – drums, percussion
- Chris Kilmore – turntables, theremin
- Ben Kenney – bass guitar, backing vocals, drums, percussion

== Certifications ==
Region	Certification	Certified units/sales
Australia (ARIA)	Platinum	15,000^{^}
^{^} Shipments figures based on certification alone.
