= Absolution Calling =

Single by Incubus

from the album Trust Fall (Side A)
- Released: February 5, 2015
- Length: 4:38
- Label: Island
- Songwriter: Incubus
- Producer: Mike Einziger

Incubus singles chronology
| "Promises, Promises" (2011) | "Absolution Calling" (2015) | "Nimble Bastard" (2017) |

Music video
- "Absolution Calling" on YouTube

"Absolution Calling" is the lead single for the American rock band Incubus on their 2015 EP Trust Fall (Side A).

== Release ==
On February 5, 2015, Incubus released "Absolution Calling", debuting the track on the Kevin and Bean show.

== Background ==
In an interview with KROQ-FM, Incubus's guitarist Mike Einziger revealed that "Absolution Calling" was an improvised song that was created while the band's lead singer, Brandon Boyd, was overseas. After listening to a demo of the song, Boyd was inspired to write a song about an event he had experienced that he could not describe in words.

== Composition ==
"Absolution Calling" was originally a demo based on a melody created by Incubus's bass guitarist Ben Kenney. Brandon Boyd said that Kenney's melody sounded like a song by The Cure. Rolling Stone described the song's sound as having "spaced out ambiance" that is "undercut with gnarled guitars and Brandon Boyd’s ragged vocals.

== Music video ==
On March 5, 2015, a music video for "Absolution Calling" was released. In the video, the band faces a rival gang in a dance battle reminiscent of Beat It. In a behind-the-scenes interview with Incubus by iHeartRadio, Boyd said the idea for the music video came when their bass guitarist Ben Kenney suggested having a story similar to Quadrophenia. The director for "Absolution Calling" expanded Boyd's interpretation by saying the music video also had elements of West Side Story and The Lost Boys. A lyric video was released as well.

== Reception ==
Professional ratings
Review scores
| Source | Rating |
|---|---|
| Music Unlabeled | 5/5 |
| PPCorn | 5/5 stars |
| Renowned for Sound | 3.5/5 stars |

"Absolution Calling" received both praise and criticism by reviewers. When reviewing the band's performance, The Buffalo News applauded Boyd for his "exhilarating and inspiring" performance. Similarly, PPCorn believed that Boyd's vocals were strengthened by the "powerful questions and references being asked" in the lyrics of "Absolution Calling". Nevertheless, Naomi Jones of Renowned for Sound said the band almost muffled Boyd's vocals with their music during the chorus.

Critics also had a difference in opinions on the shift of Incubus's genre in "Absolution Calling". Anne Fair of Music Unlabeled highlighted that although the song's melody was catchy, she believed the departure from previous Incubus songs could come as a surprise. Alternatively, The Buffalo News complimented Incubus's usage of indie rock and pop in the composition of "Absoulution Calling".

== Charts ==
| Chart (2015) | Peak position |
|---|---|
| US Rock & Alternative Airplay (Billboard) | 18 |
| US Hot Rock & Alternative Songs (Billboard) | 41 |
