= Dig (Incubus song) =

2007 single by Incubus

Single by Incubus

from the album Light Grenades
- Released: March 27, 2007
- Recorded: January–July 2006
- Studio: Henson Recording Studio, Hollywood, California; Southern Tracks Recording, Atlanta, Georgia
- Genre: Alternative rock
- Length: 4:17 (Album Version); 3:59 (Radio Edit)
- Label: Epic
- Songwriters: Brandon Boyd, Mike Einziger, Ben Kenney, Chris Kilmore, José Pasillas
- Producer: Brendan O'Brien

Incubus singles chronology
"Anna Molly" (2006)	"Dig" (2007)	"Oil and Water" (2007)

Music video
- "Dig" on YouTube

"Dig" is the second single released by American rock band Incubus from their sixth studio album, Light Grenades (2006). Receiving huge airplay from alternative rock radio stations throughout the United States, "Dig" peaked at number four on the Modern Rock Tracks chart. On the Adult Top 40 chart, it reached number 17, while just breaking the Billboard Hot 100 chart, peaking at #94. The song is featured in the 2009 music video game Lego Rock Band.

== Background ==
Singer Brandon Boyd said the song is "about love but love in a platonic sense or love that stems from the power of camaraderie." He added, "I was in a moment in my life where things were looking really dark and the people closest to me — the guys in the band — were like a safety net. They were, without trying to, reminding me of who I was in the midst of some of my personal struggles. ... sometimes really good friends can remind you that you are not your ego."

== Music video ==
The band made an unusual choice in letting fans help create the music video for the song by holding a contest called "I Dig Incubus", with the winner possibly having their video used as the official version. The top five contestants were announced on February 1, 2007, with fans then getting the chance to vote on a "Fan-pick".

Carlos "Kaamuz" Oliveira won both the fan pick and band pick with his animation. The video of the winner being announced was available on the contest website. Ramon Boutviseth was the runner up, and therefore won the Grand Prize.

On March 27, 2007, Kaamuz's video became available on Yahoo! Music. The final video was edited with scenes of the band playing the song.

== Charts ==
=== Weekly charts ===
Weekly chart performance for "Dig"
Chart (2007)	Peak position
Canada Hot 100 (Billboard)	72
Canada Rock (Billboard)	4
US Billboard Hot 100	94
US Adult Pop Airplay (Billboard)	17
US Alternative Airplay (Billboard)	4
US Mainstream Rock (Billboard)	17
US Pop 100 (Billboard)	96

=== Year-end charts ===
Year-end chart performance for "Dig"
Chart (2007)	Position
US Alternative Songs (Billboard)	12

== Certifications ==
Certifications for "Dig"
Region	Certification	Certified units/sales
New Zealand (RMNZ)	Gold	15,000^{‡}
^{‡} Sales+streaming figures based on certification alone.
