= If Not Now, When? (album) =

Studio album by Incubus
- Released: July 12, 2011
- Recorded: 2010–2011
- Studios: Blackbird (Berry Hill, Tennessee); Casa Chica (Malibu, California); Henson (Hollywood, California)
- Genres: Soft rock; alternative rock
- Length: 49:56
- Labels: Epic; Immortal
- Producer: Brendan O'Brien

Incubus chronology
Monuments and Melodies (2009)	If Not Now, When? (2011)	Trust Fall (Side A) (2015)

Singles from If Not Now, When?
- 1. "Adolescents" Released: April 4, 2011; 2. "Promises, Promises" Released: May 31, 2011

If Not Now, When? is the seventh studio album by American rock band Incubus, released on July 12, 2011 and named after the novel by Primo Levi. Preceded by the singles "Adolescents" and "Promises, Promises", the album represented the band's longest gap between studio albums at the time, and their final full-length release through long-time label Epic Records. Described by guitarist Michael Einziger as "a very straightforward, concise album," If Not Now, When? was recorded in the wake of an extended hiatus, and produced by frequent collaborator Brendan O'Brien. The album's cover features high wire artist Philippe Petit.

== Background and recording ==
At the close of the band's tour in support of Light Grenades (2006), the band entered an extended hiatus. Vocalist Brandon Boyd noted, "It's not that we were burned out being in a band or being in this band; I think that we, collectively, were feeling like if we didn't step away from this monster that we created then it would begin to consume us. [...] We had to plant some roots, lest we start to write songs about living on a tour bus. So we had to fall in love, we had to fall out of love, we had to make homes." Guitarist Michael Einziger elaborated further, "It just got to this point where we had been going strong for such a long period of time that we really accomplished all of our goals. [...] It was like, 'Ok, well what do we do now?' Obviously there are lots of things to do but I think we wanted to take some time, each of us personally, to explore a little bit and find out what the rest of the world was like." Bassist Ben Kenney stated, "Being with music is a creative thing and requires a certain amount of creativity - to just keep going back to that well over and over again, it doesn’t have a chance to replenish."

During this time, the band issued a greatest hits collection, Monuments and Melodies (2009), Boyd recorded and released a solo album, The Wild Trapeze (2010), Einziger studied music theory and composition as well as evolutionary biology at Harvard University, Kenney recorded another solo album, and drummer Jose Pasillas became a father. Upon the band's return, Boyd noted, "We weren't sitting at home twiddling our thumbs or anything; all of us had a lot to do. And eventually, it got to the point where it was like, 'It's time'." Regarding their reunion, Einziger stated, "I think just the gravity of my friendships with the guys in the band is really what caused [the band's return] to happen - our friendships with each other." The band subsequently reconvened in August 2010 to begin work on their next studio album.

The band subsequently began recording with producer Brendan O'Brien, who had previously worked with the band on Light Grenades (2006) and A Crow Left of the Murder... (2004). Recording took place at Blackbird Studio in Nashville, Henson Recording Studios in Los Angeles and Casa Chica in Malibu. Vocalist Brandon Boyd discussed the decision to work with O'Brien once again, stating, "We grew up listening to his records. We quickly became friends and that's been a catalyst for our success with him. He understands that we like to work quickly." Einziger elaborated further, "I love Brendan and I consider him like a family member. Over the years he’s been like a musical confidante and he’s been very loyal and very helpful. He’s gotten involved in other stuff that he didn’t have to get involved with outside of the band." Pasillas noted, "He’s kind of like a sixth member." Einziger recorded the majority of his guitar parts in his house.

== Writing and composition ==
According to Boyd, the majority of the album was written whilst the band was in the studio: "We recorded the songs while we wrote them, which is something we’ve never really done before."

Einziger noted that his contributions to the album were influenced by his musical studies during the band's hiatus: "Maybe my desire to return to simplicity, or even to just go to simplicity - because I've never really written music that simple before — is sort of a response to maybe having a better or larger perspective of the overall musical landscape that I’ve never had before." Einziger elaborated further, "Over the years, we've become less and less aggressive as far as our music goes. There's always moments of that aggression, but this album is pretty free of that. It's definitely not a hard rock record. I think we're asking a lot of our fans. We're asking them to listen for things that they normally wouldn't listen for. We're not leaning on the strengths of our last records either. It's that much different than our previous work. I think we took a risk by making this type of album. But it's not some crazy, experimental album." Boyd cited Einziger as a key reason for the band's new direction, noting "Michael really buckled down and studied musical composition that inspired him to reach out and dig into different places that he never has before."

Einziger noted that the musical direction on this album was influenced by the overriding notion of "simplicity;" "Brandon and I, when we started focusing on writing songs for this album, something that we hadn't really focused on in the past was the idea of this very, very strong simplicity. That's what this album is based on, some very, very simple ideas. [...] I think the sounds that a lot of people come to expect from us are based on the idea of large walls of very thick guitars. That's kind of a trademark for a lot of loud, aggressive rock music, but it can also be a crutch, or a wall that you can hide behind. But we didn't rely on that for this album, it actually doesn't have any of that."

Closing track, "Tomorrow's Food", was the first song written for the album. Einziger stated that the song was conceived in 2009 with Lee Hartney from the Smith Street Band and "was written at a time when I didn’t know whether or not we were going to go back and start working on new music for a new album. I’d been off at Harvard for a while and Brandon was really focusing on painting and for a little while there we didn’t have all that much communication.[...] I just sort of wrote that guitar part, the chord progression and the changes and stuff and Brandon just sort of responded to it.[...] We kind of just put it aside and then when we started working on new music for this album, I think we always knew that we wanted to record it in the studio and make it really great. But that actually was one of the last things that we did for this album."

Boyd described the album as having "a very a particularly warm musical tone to it. It steps further out from anything we've ever done." Boyd also noted that the sound on the new record is the culmination of a long search for a new sound and direction for the band; "I do believe that for many years now we have been searching for something different. Something unique, both to the world and to us as a band. We decided that If Not Now, When?, our seventh full length studio album, would be just that." Prior to the album's release, bassist Ben Kenney discussed the writing process in relation to fan expectations, stating "from my perspective, we only write music to satisfy ourselves. We love to play and we’ve been fortunate to have people follow us and have really great and successful records. But, for the most part it’s to entertain each other and write music that we like to play." Discussing the band's stylistic change, Kenney noted, "There’s no way we could have written this record a few years ago."

Producer Brendan O'Brien praised drummer Jose Pasillas' contributions, stating, "Jose really embraced the whole idea of making everything he played mean something. The groove is super-important because it has to work with the vocals and the melody, and he made a conscious effort to really support the song. I think it shows."

Following the expansion of his role from turntablist to keyboardist on Light Grenades (2006), Chris Kilmore stated that, during the band's hiatus, he "took a lot of piano lessons and did a lot of learning keyboards. I made a lot of music, but it just sits at home, it’s not for everybody, it’s just for me as a learning process. A lot of practicing, I’d be playing music every single day, keys every single day. I was scratching a little bit, but mostly keys, because my role in this band has kind of evolved. So to pick up a new instrument and learn it in a few years was hard to do. [...] I’m really serious and focused about it, that’s what the rehearsals are for, hitting all those wrong notes. But I have questions, and there is a lot of people around me that I can ask, Ben is an incredible musician, Mike is an incredible musician and composer, and if I need something explained or helped with, I don’t have to go far to get an answer."

Ben Kenney noted that the album's overall aesthetic revealed itself at the end of the process: "We were trying to figure out an order for the songs. The sound, the overall feel, I don’t think anybody really had an idea that it was going to turn out the way it did."

=== Lyrical content ===
Thematically, the album addresses romance, with Boyd noting, "it's about love and finding art and success in love. I never know what I'm going to be writing about until I'm actually writing about it. It's what's relevant in my heart and mind. There's definitely a romantic undertone and overtone."

=== Album title ===
According to Boyd, the album's title stems from his constant re-assessment of life; "I'm addicted to the news. There's so much at play right now, so many important, catastrophic, beautiful things. This idea If Not Now, When? seems terribly poignant." The singer told Spin the title refers to a quote from Hillel, the rabbi of the Mishnah, who said: "If I am not for myself, who will be? And when I am for myself, what am 'I'? And if not now, when?" (Avot 1:14) This third question, from which the album's title is derived, contains the admonition not to postpone any duties. It also echoes the admonition he gives with reference to study (Avot 2:4): "Say not, 'When I have free time I shall study'; for you may perhaps never have any free time."

Einziger noted, "It just seems like a very appropriate name for the album because we've been in the spirit of taking risk, stepping up and making a leap. For us, it's a very common theme for us to take chances, to do things differently. There's something exciting and equally scary about that idea. Now we've nothing left to lose, really. We've kind of accomplished everything we wanted to accomplish as a band; at this point we're just living our dreams."

== Critical reception ==
Professional ratings
Aggregate scores
Source	Rating
Metacritic	48/100
Review scores
Source	Rating
AllMusic	3.5/5 stars
Alternative Press	2/5 stars
Beats Per Minute	18%
Drowned in Sound	6/10
Entertainment Weekly	C+
Kerrang!	1/5 stars
PopMatters	4/10
Rock Sound	8/10
Rolling Stone	2.5/5 stars
Spin	3/5 stars

According to the review aggregator Metacritic, If Not Now, When? received "mixed or average reviews" based on a weighted average score of 48 out of 100 from 15 critic scores. Most critics noted the lack of harder songs on the album and its "slow, elevator-music-style tempo". Beats per Minute identified this album as part of a continuing decline in quality that began with Light Grenades in 2006: "five years off should have rejuvenated the band, but instead their creativity seems to have diminished further". Johnny Firecloud of The Antiquiet wrote that the album finds Incubus "in a new dimension", and that it has an "atmospheric embrace decidedly feminine in nature."

Spin's Mikael Wood gave it a three out of five rating on July 12, 2011. He wrote, "these Left Coast alt-metal lifers have made their reputation by earnestly searching for the vulnerable bro trapped inside the nookie-seeking mook (Partial credit should go to the genial good looks of singer Brandon Boyd)", adding that, "on the band’s seventh studio album, Incubus fully embrace surf-bum balladry, and if Boyd’s lyrics carry a whiff of Keanu — 'I was low, but now I am high,' he reveals in 'In the Company of Wolves' — the warm slow-jam sonics provide a soothing distraction." Michael Brown of Drowned in Sound criticized the album's vocals and lyrics, writing in July 2011 that, "a number of complaints can be levelled directly at frontman Brandon Boyd, whose California surfer shtick has, in the past, been tolerable in amongst the band’s louder moments as it tended towards a serviceable Mike Patton impersonation. However, when crooning lines like 'baby can I be the rabbit in your hat / I’d swing if you’d hand me, hand me the bat' over middle-of-the-road, up-tempo piano dirges like 'Promises, Promises', it all becomes slightly hard to swallow."

Stacey Anderson of Rolling Stone gave the album a mixed review on July 11, 2011, commenting that "Brandon Boyd's game has decayed a bit. On his band’s first album in five years, the Incubus heartthrob — who once tugged at TRL viewers’ heartstrings with the riffed-out sugar shot 'Stellar' — is telling his beloved she’s 'light like a feather, bright like a dying star' on 'Switchblade.'". She adds that, "just as Boyd’s lyrics have gone a little soft, Incubus’ seventh album dilutes the hard-edged funk rock of their early-2000s peak popularity into slick, inert ripples of interchangeable power pop."

Catherine Yates of Classic Rock characterized the album as having "carefully crafted, folkish ballads", and awarded it a three out of five rating on July 20, 2011. Yates observed that "while Korn and Deftones have retained much of the sonic weight and intensity of their earlier definitive works, fellow SoCalfusioneers Incubus hit the mellow button pretty fast as their quest for a more ‘mature’ direction sent them into far quieter waters." She added, "If you wanted proof of just how much excitement has been traded in for the chillzone since the hyperactive heydays of 1997’s S.C.I.E.N.C.E. and ‘99’s Make Yourself, then you need look no further than Brandon Boyd’s own solo Wild Trapeze project from last year – a largely acoustic outing, low on both wildness and trapeze activity."

=== Legacy ===
In January 2012, Allan Raible of ABC News ranked it 22nd on his list of the 50 best albums of 2011, with Raible labelling it an "adult alternative answer to Make Yourself" and "a hundred times better than Coldplay's disastrous Mylo Xyloto." He noted "sadly, this album was virtually ignored or worse, bashed by the majority of the mainstream music press." When ranking the discography of Incubus in 2020, Kerrang! placed the album last. In a 2022 Louder Sound article, Brandon Boyd ranked it as his third favorite Incubus album. In 2023, Alternative Press placed it seventh in their ranking, ahead of only 2017's 8. They commented that, "this marks when Incubus went completely soft for an album", adding that "while it may have been authentic for them to lose their youthful grit, it, sadly, did not result in the music many of us desire from the group."

== Commercial performance ==
If Not Now, When? debuted at number 2 on the Billboard 200 with first-week sales of 80,000. As of March 2015, the album has sold 222,000 copies in the United States. According to Steve Rennie, the band's former manager, the album has sold around 600,000 copies worldwide.

== Track listing ==
No.	Title	Length
1.	"If Not Now, When?"	5:05
2.	"Promises, Promises"	4:25
3.	"Friends and Lovers"	4:06
4.	"Thieves"	4:16
5.	"Isadore"	4:34
6.	"The Original"	5:04
7.	"Defiance"	2:17
8.	"In the Company of Wolves"	7:34
9.	"Switchblade"	3:27
10.	"Adolescents"	4:48
11.	"Tomorrow's Food"	4:20
Total length:		49:56

Pre-order bonus track
No.	Title	Length
1.	"Surface to Air" (B-side)	4:14

iTunes bonus track
No.	Title	Length
12.	"Rebel Girls" (UK B-Side)	3:15
13.	"Drive" (Recorded Live from the Concert for the Miners - Santiago, Chile; October 2010)	4:22

Deluxe edition
No.	Title	Length
12.	"Surface to Air" (Live)	4:42
13.	"Dig" (Live)	5:08
14.	"Pardon Me" (Live)	3:58

Japanese version
No.	Title	Length
12.	"Surface to Air"	4:12
13.	"Megalomaniac" (Live)	5:37
14.	"Pardon Me" (Live)	3:58
15.	"Anna Molly" (Live)	3:49
16.	"Wish You Were Here" (Live)	3:41

Australian version
No.	Title	Length
12.	"Surface to Air" (B-side)	4:12
13.	"Megalomaniac" (Live from Chile)	5:38
14.	"Dig" (Live from Chile)	5:08
15.	"Love Hurts" (Live from Chile)	3:58
16.	"Wish You Were Here" (Live from Chile)	3:42
17.	"Nice to Know You" (Live from Chile)	6:20

Unreleased track
No.	Title	Length
1.	"Hold Me Down" (Included in the IncubusHQ Mobile App)	3:53

== Personnel ==
Incubus

- Brandon Boyd – lead vocals, rhythm guitar, percussion
- Michael Einziger – lead guitar, piano, backing vocals, string orchestration and arrangements, conducting
- Jose Pasillas II – drums
- Chris Kilmore – piano, keyboards, mellotron, organ, turntables
- Ben Kenney – bass guitar, backing vocals

Artwork

- Brandon Boyd – art direction
- Sheri Lee – art direction
- Thierry Orbach – cover photograph
- Brantley Gutierrez – band photography

Additional musicians

- Ann Marie Orchestra – strings

Recording

- Brendan O'Brien – producer
- Tom Syrowski – engineer
- Lowell Reynolds – assistant engineer
- Paul LaMalfa – assistant engineer
- Greg DePante – assistant engineer
- Billy Bowers – assistant engineer
- Michael Einziger – assistant engineer
- George Marino – mastering

== Charts ==
=== Weekly charts ===
Weekly chart performance for If Not Now, When?
Chart (2011)	Peak position
Australian Albums (ARIA)	10
Austrian Albums (Ö3 Austria)	9
Canadian Albums (Billboard)	11
Dutch Albums (Album Top 100)	51
French Albums (SNEP)	137
German Albums (Offizielle Top 100)	5
Irish Albums (IRMA)	84
Italian Albums (FIMI)	68
New Zealand Albums (RMNZ)	5
Scottish Albums (Official Charts)	38
Spanish Albums (Promusicae)	32
Swiss Albums (Schweizer Hitparade)	9
UK Albums (Official Charts)	20
US Billboard 200	2
US Top Alternative Albums (Billboard)	1
US Top Hard Rock Albums (Billboard)	1
US Top Rock Albums (Billboard)	1

=== Year-end charts ===
Year-end chart performance for If Not Now, When?
Chart (2011)	Position
US Billboard 200	198
US Top Rock Albums (Billboard)	37
