= Adolescents (song) =

Single by Incubus

from the album If Not Now, When?
- Released: April 19, 2011
- Recorded: 2010–2011
- Genre: Alternative rock, psychedelic rock
- Length: 4:49
- Label: Epic
- Songwriters: Brandon Boyd, Mike Einziger, Ben Kenney, Chris Kilmore, Jose Pasillas

Incubus singles chronology
"Let's Go Crazy" (2009)	"Adolescents" (2011)	"Promises, Promises" (2011)

Music video
- "Adolescents" on YouTube

"Adolescents" is the lead single from Incubus' seventh album, If Not Now, When?. It was posted on the band's website on April 4, 2011 (a physical release was released 15 days later, April 19). This is their first single in two years following the release of the Prince and the Revolution cover "Let's Go Crazy" (from the 2009 compilation Monuments and Melodies). It has since peaked at #3 on both the Billboard Alternative Songs chart and the Billboard Rock Songs chart, and peaked at #1 on Bubbling Under Hot 100 Singles.

== Writing and composition ==
Regarding the decision to release the song as a single, guitarist Michael Einziger noted, "I think it’s the most easily digestible song for our fans. I was surprised when we turned all this music in, "Adolescents" was actually the last song we wrote for this album. We actually had a few other songs that we left off of the album and we didn't even know if we were going to put "Adolescents" on the album. It was kinda like one of the floater songs. I mean we loved all the songs but we wanted to make an eleven-song record; we didn't want to have a thirteen-song record. We wanted it to be less is more. Everybody that we played the music for seemed to just automatically think that song would be a good segue into this album for our fans."

== Track listing ==
- Digital download
1. "Adolescents" – 4:48

== Charts ==
=== Weekly charts ===
Chart (2011)	Peak position
Canada Rock (Billboard)	29
US Bubbling Under Hot 100 (Billboard)	1
US Hot Rock & Alternative Songs (Billboard)	3

=== Year-end charts ===
Chart (2011)	Position
US Hot Rock & Alternative Songs (Billboard)	19
