= Anna Molly =

Single by Incubus

from the album Light Grenades
- Released: September 20, 2006
- Recorded: 2006
- Genre: Alternative rock; alternative metal
- Label: Epic
- Songwriters: Brandon Boyd, Mike Einziger, Ben Kenney, Chris Kilmore, Jose Pasillas
- Producer: Brendan O'Brien

Incubus singles chronology
"Make a Move" (2005)	"Anna Molly" (2006)	"Dig" (2007)

Music video
- "Anna Molly" on YouTube

"Anna Molly" is the lead single from Incubus's sixth album, Light Grenades. The single was released September 20, 2006, on the Sony Music Store almost a month before its scheduled release. However, it was soon withdrawn for unknown reasons.

The song debuted at #19 on the Billboard Modern Rock Tracks chart and reached the #1 spot after 10 weeks on the chart. It stayed at the top for 5 weeks.

The song makes use of a Marxophone, a type of fretless zither. The song's title is a play on the word "anomaly", and a Billboard article says the song describes "a woman who may or may not exist in real life". There is an acoustic version that is also available through iTunes.

== Music video ==
On September 26, 2006, the Oil Factory Inc. produced and filmed the music video for "Anna Molly" in Wilmington, California, and Jamie Thraves directed the video.

The music video for the single features a woman played by Sasha Wexler who is found at a park, presumably deceased, and shows how she is passed from an ambulance on a stretcher, into a morgue, and finally on an autopsy table. Throughout the video, she is shown moving her fingers little by little, even as she is put in a freezer. At the end of the video, as a medical examiner is about to perform the autopsy, her fingers move again, accompanied by a stream of tears. As the doctor brings his saw to her head, she reaches up and grabs his wrist tightly. The final scene shows the saw spinning on the floor. There is no blood on it.

The story is loosely based on the 1955 Alfred Hitchcock Presents episode "Breakdown".

== Track listing ==
=== UK single ===
1. "Anna Molly" (Album Version) – 3:46
2. "Anna Molly" (Live at Edgefest 2006)
3. "Drive" (Live at Edgefest 2006)
4. "Love Hurts" (Acoustic)

== Personnel ==
=== Incubus ===
- Brandon Boyd – vocals
- Mike Einziger – guitar
- Chris Kilmore – marxophone, keyboards
- Ben Kenney – bass
- Jose Pasillas – drums

== Charts ==
=== Weekly charts ===
Weekly chart performance for "Anna Molly"
Chart (2006–2007)	Peak position
Canada Hot 100 (Billboard)	94
Canada Rock (Billboard)	2
Scotland Singles (OCC)	92
UK Singles (OCC)	197
US Billboard Hot 100	66
US Alternative Airplay (Billboard)	1
US Mainstream Rock (Billboard)	4
US Pop 100 (Billboard)	81

=== Year-end charts ===
Year-end chart performance for "Anna Molly"
Chart (2007)	Position
US Alternative Songs (Billboard)	16
US Mainstream Rock Songs (Billboard)	38
