= Talk Shows on Mute =

Single by Incubus

from the album A Crow Left of the Murder...
- Released: 2004
- Recorded: October–November 2003
- Studio: Southern Tracks Recording, Atlanta, Georgia
- Genre: Alternative rock, pop rock, art rock
- Length: 3:52
- Label: Epic/Immortal
- Songwriters: Brandon Boyd, Mike Einziger, Ben Kenney, Chris Kilmore, José Pasillas
- Producer: Brendan O'Brien

Incubus singles chronology
"Megalomaniac" (2003)	"Talk Shows on Mute" (2004)	"Make a Move" (2005)

Music video
- "Talk Shows on Mute" on YouTube

"Talk Shows on Mute" is a song by the American alternative rock band Incubus. Released as the second single from the band's 2004 album, A Crow Left of the Murder..., it peaked at No. 3 on the Billboard Modern Rock Tracks chart, No. 18 on the Mainstream Rock Tracks chart, and No. 16 on the Bubbling Under Hot 100 Singles chart.

== Background ==
The song has a mellow and stripped-down sound, with lyrics containing references to George Orwell's novel Nineteen Eighty-Four and Philip K. Dick's novel Do Androids Dream of Electric Sheep?. Lead singer Brandon Boyd says the inspiration for the song came to him while watching a talk show on an airplane.

"I was on an airplane when a talk show began playing on the TVs. I decided to start narrating for the people, which is a really great game if you're ever bored enough. I realized a time will probably come when television will watch us if we're watching it, if that hasn't already happened, figuratively or literally. It sounded like some sort of pseudo-Big Brother nightmare, so I wrote it down."

== Music video ==
The song's music video was directed by Floria Sigismondi, who also directed the band's "Megalomaniac" video. The video alludes to another George Orwell novel, Animal Farm. It depicts a world where animals have taken over, and the members of Incubus are shown on a talk show demonstrating "stupid human trix".

== Track listing ==
US/EU CD single

1. Talk Shows on Mute
2. Wish You Were Here (Live In Osaka, Japan)
3. Talk Shows on Mute (Live In Osaka, Japan)
4. Hello - BBC Radio 1 Version

Yellow 7"

- Side A
1. Talk Shows on Mute
2. Here in My Room - BBC Radio 1 Version
- Side B
1. Vitamin - Live "Bootleg" Version - Osaka, Japan
2. Hello - Live "Bootleg" Version - Osaka, Japan

== Charts ==
Chart performance for "Talk Shows on Mute"
Chart (2004)	Peak position
Netherlands (Single Top 100)	42
New Zealand (Recorded Music NZ)	24
Scotland Singles (OCC)	54
UK Singles (OCC)	43
UK Rock & Metal (OCC)	4
US Bubbling Under Hot 100 (Billboard)	16
US Alternative Airplay (Billboard)	3
US Mainstream Rock (Billboard)	18
