= Jason Boyd =

Jason Boyd may refer to:

- Jason Boyd (baseball) (born 1973), Major League Baseball pitcher
- Jason Boyd (actor), played Piers Polkiss in the Harry Potter films
- Poo Bear (born 1979), American songwriter and record producer
- Jason Boyd, American singer, lead vocalist for Audiovent
