= Make a Move (Incubus song) =

2005 single by Incubus

Single by Incubus

from the album Stealth Soundtrack
- Released: December 4, 2005
- Recorded: 2004
- Genre: Alternative rock
- Length: 3:14
- Label: Epic
- Songwriters: Brandon Boyd, Mike Einziger, Ben Kenney, Chris Kilmore, José Pasillas

Incubus singles chronology
"Talk Shows on Mute" (2004)	"Make a Move" (2005)	"Anna Molly" (2006)

Music video
- "Make a Move" on YouTube

"Make a Move" is a single released by American alternative rock band Incubus, released from the soundtrack to the film Stealth.

The song utilizes a unique melodic structure in that its main guitar and bass riffs are in the key of E minor, while lead vocalist Brandon Boyd's melody is performed in the key of E major, with the notes cleverly placed to prevent the clashing minor third (G) and major third (G#) from occurring simultaneously.

The single peaked at number 17 on the Billboard Modern Rock chart.

== Track listing ==
=== Promo CD ===
1. Make a Move (Radio Edit)
2. Make a Move (Album Version)

== Charts ==
=== Weekly charts ===
Weekly chart performance for "Make a Move"
Chart (2005)	Peak position
US Alternative Airplay (Billboard)	17

=== Year-end charts ===
Year-end chart performance for "Make a Move"
Chart (2005)	Position
US Modern Rock Tracks (Billboard)	88
