= A Crow Left of the Murder... =

Studio album by Incubus
- Released: February 3, 2004
- Recorded: October–November 2003
- Studios: Southern Tracks Recording, Atlanta, Georgia
- Genres: Alternative rock; art rock; alternative metal
- Length: 58:30
- Labels: Epic; Immortal
- Producer: Brendan O'Brien

Incubus chronology
Live at Lollapalooza 2003 (2003)	A Crow Left of the Murder... (2004)	Live in Japan 2004 (2004)

Singles from A Crow Left of the Murder...
- 1. "Megalomaniac" Released: December 23, 2003; 2. "Talk Shows on Mute" Released: May 25, 2004

A Crow Left of the Murder... is the fifth studio album by the American rock band Incubus, released on February 3, 2004. The album marks the first appearance of bassist Ben Kenney, following the departure of founding member Dirk Lance. The singles from the album are "Megalomaniac" and "Talk Shows on Mute". "Agoraphobia" was released as a promo single.

== Music ==
The music of A Crow Left of the Murder... has been considered to have elements of art rock, alternative rock, alternative metal, jazz, pop and progressive rock. The work of guitarist Mike Einziger takes equal prominence in focus to that of vocalist Brandon Boyd, in contrast to previous albums which focused more prominently on Boyd's vocalization. MTV reviewer Joe D'Angelo claimed that on the album Einziger's "funk and metal roots haven't completely disappeared; they're now just the foundation on which a repertoire of jazz, blues and progressive rock is built." Some critics believed that the band were allowed to take more musical risks on the album following the commercial success of 2001's Morning View, although Einziger said in a 2004 interview that, "we've never felt we didn't have that freedom. We've always done what we wanted. It's kind of self-serving, but that's how we do it. We try not to pay attention to anything but each other."

=== Songs ===
Einziger has said that "Megalomaniac" was originally written on an acoustic guitar, despite being one of the heavier songs on the album. Boyd remarked that "'Megalomaniac' means self-exaltation, and to be crazy for big things. The song is about power crazed people and their destructive behavior." He adds, "lyrically speaking I know that there were a lot of things going on in and around the world and there were some very specific people in my mind coming dangerously close to having megalomaniacal tendencies and so I did my best to write those thoughts down." While it was written around the time George W. Bush ordered the 2003 invasion of Iraq, Boyd claimed the person in the song was a composite of several people, and primarily inspired by a character in the 1986 movie Three Amigos. The music video for the song was handled by Italian-Canadian director Floria Sigismondi, and had allusions to both Adolf Hitler and Bush. Sigismondi came up with the concept for the video, with Boyd reflecting in 2004 that "when we did the video for 'Megalomaniac,' it was a really rewarding experience. Not only the outcome, the process was very rewarding as well. She's a great person. She knew exactly what she wanted to see and wasn't afraid to ask for it. She wasn't a screamer — some directors are screamers, they just yell at people. She didn't do that, which was nice."

Due to the political references, MTV initially refused to show the "Megalomaniac" video except for late at night, as it was under pressure from conservative groups following the 2004 Janet Jackson Super Bowl controversy, where one of the singer's breasts was exposed at a halftime show they produced. In response to the Super Bowl controversy, MTV moved six potentially offensive videos to late night rotation, with "Megalomaniac" being the only one without any explicit sexual content. At the time, Einziger commented "it's ironic that this MTV scrutiny comes from an incident where someone bared their chest in public, while for the first time, our singer has his shirt on for an entire video."

"Talk Shows on Mute" was written as an examination of the effects of television on people. It was inspired by a flight where Boyd began narrating to his fellow passengers a talk show playing on the plane's television. Boyd said that after this, "I realized a time will probably come when television will watch us if we're watching it, if that hasn't already happened, figuratively or literally. It sounded like some sort of pseudo-Big Brother nightmare, so I wrote it down." The line, "Come one, Come all into 1984" does not refer to the year, where all the band members were still children, but rather George Orwell's 1949 book Nineteen Eighty-Four.

The song "Priceless" features rapping-style vocals which recall the band's earlier work from the 1990s. Boyd said that "Priceless" and a few of the other songs on the album "started as letters to myself", adding that "I wrote a couple of the songs on the record from someone close to me's point of view, stepping into their sight and speaking for them."

Early pressings of the album list track 12 "Smile Lines" as "Suite Lines" on the back cover. The Japanese pressing of the album comes with a bonus track, "Monuments & Melodies" which is also available on the Alive at Red Rocks bonus CD.

== Touring and promotion ==
Incubus began their world tour for the album in March 2004 with shows in Japan and South Korea. On March 12, 2004, the band played their first show in the Philippines, a country where they had attracted a large following. The band played further shows in Australia, New Zealand, Malaysia and Europe before beginning a tour of North America in June 2004, which would continue for the rest of the year. To further promote the album in 2004, Incubus performed on Jimmy Kimmel Live!, the Top of the Pops in the United Kingdom and the Rove Live talk show in Australia. At a June 2004 show in London, the band notably performed the song "Take Me to Your Leader" for the first time since 1998, and went on to play it eight more times that year. These 2004 performances are to date the last time a Fungus Amongus/Enjoy Incubus song has been played live.

In 2005, the band contributed the songs "Admiration", "Neither of Us Can See" and "Make a Move" to the soundtrack of the action film Stealth, with "Make a Move" being released as a single that year. The song "Aqueous Transmission" from Morning View also appeared on the film's soundtrack album, in addition to being used within the film itself.

== Commercial response ==
A Crow Left of the Murder... debuted at number two on the US Billboard 200, selling about 332,000 copies in its first week on the chart. It has since been certified platinum by the RIAA.

== Reception ==
Professional ratings
Aggregate scores
Source	Rating
Metacritic	66/100
Review scores
Source	Rating
AllMusic	4.5/5 stars
Blender	3/5 stars
Entertainment Weekly	C−
Los Angeles Times	3/4 stars
Mojo	3/5 stars
Q	3/5 stars
Rolling Stone	3/5 stars
Slant Magazine	4/5 stars
Spin	C+
USA Today	3/4 stars

According to the review aggregator Metacritic, A Crow Left of the Murder... received "generally favorable reviews" based on a weighted average score of 66 out of 100 from 11 critic scores. Stuart Green of Canadian publication Exclaim! gave it a positive review in March 2004, he wrote "with the addition of soulful Roots bassist Ben Kenney and a tasty fusion of everything from Faith No More-style rap metal to the prog-noodling of Rush (most notably on 'Sick Sad Little World', the album's standout track) to the earnest songwriting of, say, the Beatles or the Dave Matthews Band, this disc should establish them as the leaders of the new rock pack... at least in artistry if not sales."

Stephen Thomas Erlewine of AllMusic awarded the album four-and-a-half out of five stars, claiming that, "at the beginning of their career, Incubus was rightly lumped in with the legions of post-Korn alt metal/rap-rock bands swarming America in the latter days of the 20th century", and that, "A Crow Left of the Murder... is far more interesting than any of their other records, or their peers." Mikael Wood of the Dallas Observer reflected in his review that, "Southern California's Incubus emerged from the rap-rock pack in 2001 when its hit single 'Drive' revealed front man Brandon Boyd to be the kind of guy who might come back to his high school nine years after he graduated to give a motivational speech and award one lucky essay-writing girl an unforgettable dance at the senior prom. Before that the band played warmed-over funk-metal and made CDs with really awful covers." He adds, "Boyd freaks his falsetto a lot, giving 'Smile Lines' and 'Beware! Criminal' a supple, sensual curvature that's anathema to most rap-rockers; there's a defanged Tori Amos/Trent Reznor pulse to 'Sick Sad Little World'; 'Pistola' is almost post-punk in its compact fury'." Joshua Klein of The Washington Post stated, "A Crow Left of the Murder shows success has gone to the band's head, but only in the best sense. Here Incubus reverts to its weirder, wilder roots without abandoning its newfound pop appeal."

Eric R. Danton of The Baltimore Sun wrote in his February 2004 review, "alternative-metal bands have tended to embody self-absorption far more than self-awareness, and we've all seen how that has turned out: It's made Fred Durst wealthy in inverse proportion to his talent. Incubus, at least, has avoided many of the petulant excesses that fuel Limp Bizkit and Linkin Park. With a few pop-savvy ballads and a hottie front man in Brandon Boyd, Incubus has even attracted an audience that encompasses more than surly teen-age boys." He added, "the alt-metal sound is mostly played out, but Incubus' determination to continue developing is clear here, and it will help to keep the band relevant in an increasingly splintered music scene."

In their March 2004 review, The Oklahoman wrote that, "its finest moments recalls the more adventurous musical explorations of their major label debut S.C.I.E.N.C.E.", noting that "Megalomaniac", "Pistola", "Priceless" and "Leech" possess a "caffeine-fueled drive." They additionally observed that, "of course, there had to be a couple of idealistic love ballads for the young women who really are only interested in singer Brandon Boyd. To fill that slot, the album's 'Southern Girl' and the piano-driven 'Here in My Room' feature a harmony at their conclusion reminiscent of something off The Beach Boys' Pet Sounds." Scott Shetler of Slant Magazine gave it four out of five stars, writing "like it or not, Incubus is the prototypical rock band for the 21st century, appealing equally to both sexes — they’re likable guys who write memorable songs and it doesn’t hurt that they’ve got a model for a lead singer." Shetler adds, "Incubus have never made any huge leaps in terms of their sound, but they’ve always managed to change it just enough to stay slightly ahead of the pack, and with Crow they’ve simply done it again."

=== Legacy ===
In 2017, Dan Weiss of Consequence of Sound had a negative view of the band's direction on A Crow Left of the Murder..., writing that it was "their most strident record to date, and by then their eclecticism was so pared down you couldn't hear much Faith No More or hip-hop or quirky distinctions." In his review for the Alive at Red Rocks CD/DVD, Alex Henderson of AllMusic claimed that "some fans of their early rap-metal/funk metal work see 2001's Morning View and 2004's A Crow Left of the Murder as a sellout." In a 2006 interview with The New Zealand Herald, Brandon Boyd reflected, "it's funny because the way it's perceived around the world is vastly different. For some people Crow was the best record we've ever done, but some people look at that record as a pause in our talent as a band."

Kerrang! ranked it as the second best Incubus album in 2020, and stated it "[was] the sound of Incubus maturing; finding ever-subtler applications for their melting pot of styles." Boyd also ranked it as his second favorite Incubus record in a 2022 Louder Sound article.

== Track listing ==
All tracks are written by Incubus.

A Crow Left of the Murder... track listing
No.	Title	Length
1.	"Megalomaniac"	4:54
2.	"A Crow Left of the Murder"	3:30
3.	"Agoraphobia"	3:52
4.	"Talk Shows on Mute"	3:48
5.	"Beware! Criminal"	3:48
6.	"Sick Sad Little World"	6:23
7.	"Pistola"	4:22
8.	"Southern Girl"	3:40
9.	"Priceless"	4:06
10.	"Zee Deveel"	3:52
11.	"Made for TV Movie"	3:38
12.	"Smile Lines"	3:59
13.	"Here in My Room"	4:19
14.	"Leech"	4:19
Total length:		58:30

Japanese bonus track
No.	Title	Length
15.	"Monuments and Melodies"	5:05
Total length:		1:03:35

B-side
No.	Title	Length
1.	"Pantomime" (Later released on the Alive at Red Rocks EP)	3:54

When bought at some retailers (including Best-Buy) a bonus live EP was bundled with the CD.

2004 bonus EP
No.	Title	Length
1.	"Pardon Me" (live in Osaka, Japan)	4:58
2.	"Pantomime" (live at Merdeka Stadium, Lumpur, Malaysia)	5:17
3.	"Talk Shows on Mute" (live at Entertainment Center, Sydney, Australia)	3:50
4.	"A Certain Shade of Green" (live at Entertainment Center, Sydney, Australia)	3:32

Bonus DVD

1. "Lollapalooza" – 9:13
  - Includes a brief interview discussing the Lollapalooza tour, then performances of "Megalomaniac" and "Pistola".
2. "Bridge Benefit" – 8:41
  - Includes a brief interview discussing the Bridge School Benefit, follow by acoustic performances of "A Crow Left of the Murder" and "Talk Shows on Mute"
3. While We Were Out – 7:35
  - This documentary is about the making of the album in Atlanta, Georgia, as well as some interview footage, and some footage of other things the band have gotten up to whilst they were out. It also introduces Ben Kenney, who recently joined as the bassist for the band.
4. Brandon's Injury – 1:06
  - A short mock-umentary about how Brandon injured his ankle.
5. Short Film – 6:31
  - Although not listed on the packaging, there is also a short film by Brendan Hearne, starring Mike Einziger.

A SACD edition has also been released, along with a Dualdisc edition as well.

== Personnel ==
=== Incubus ===
- Brandon Boyd – vocals
- Mike Einziger – guitar; piano on "Here In My Room", additional engineering
- Ben Kenney – bass guitar
- Chris Kilmore – turntables, keyboards, Mellotron, marxophone
- José Pasillas – drums, percussion

=== Production ===
- Brendan O'Brien – production, mixing
- Nick DiDia – engineer
- Billy Bowers – additional engineering
- Bob Ludwig – mastering

== Charts ==
=== Weekly charts ===
Weekly chart performance for A Crow Left of the Murder...
Chart (2004)	Peak position
Australian Albums (ARIA)	2
Austrian Albums (Ö3 Austria)	8
Belgian Albums (Ultratop Flanders)	34
Belgian Albums (Ultratop Wallonia)	44
Canadian Albums (Billboard)	1
Danish Albums (Hitlisten)	34
Dutch Albums (Album Top 100)	14
Finnish Albums (Suomen virallinen lista)	16
French Albums (SNEP)	21
German Albums (Offizielle Top 100)	2
Irish Albums (IRMA)	14
Italian Albums (FIMI)	11
New Zealand Albums (RMNZ)	1
Portuguese Albums (AFP)	3
Scottish Albums (Official Charts)	5
Swedish Albums (Sverigetopplistan)	55
Swiss Albums (Schweizer Hitparade)	10
UK Albums (Official Charts)	6
US Billboard 200	2

=== Year-end charts ===
Year-end chart performance for A Crow Left of the Murder...
Chart (2004)	Position
New Zealand Albums (RMNZ)	33
US Billboard 200	61

== Certifications ==
Certifications for A Crow Left of the Murder...
Region	Certification	Certified units/sales
New Zealand (RMNZ)	Platinum	15,000^{^}
United Kingdom (BPI)	Gold	100,000^{^}
United States (RIAA)	Platinum	1,000,000^{^}
^{^} Shipments figures based on certification alone.
