= 8 (Incubus album) =

Studio album by Incubus
- Released: April 21, 2017
- Recorded: 2016–2017
- Genres: Alternative rock; indie rock; electronic rock; pop rock
- Length: 40:12
- Label: Island
- Producers: Incubus; Dave Sardy (uncredited); Leandro Dusso Jr.; Sonny Moore

Incubus chronology
Trust Fall (Side A) (2015)	8 (2017)	Trust Fall (Side B) (2020)

Singles from 8
- 1. "Nimble Bastard" Released: February 17, 2017; 2. "Loneliest" Released: December 12, 2017; 3. "No Fun" Released: January 31, 2018

8 is the eighth studio album by American rock band Incubus. It was released on April 21, 2017, through Island Records. The album takes its name from being the band's eighth LP. The album was previously produced by Dave Sardy, and later re-produced and mixed by Skrillex, a close friend of the band. The album's first single, "Nimble Bastard", peaked at number 4 on the Billboard Mainstream Rock Songs chart in April 2017. 8 is the last studio album with bassist Ben Kenney before his departure in 2024.

== Background ==
The writing for 8 began at the end of 2015, when the band was putting together Side B of their Trust Fall EP. However, with the amount of quality content they were producing, they decided to release an LP instead. Recording took place throughout 2016 and 2017, with production and remixing occurring throughout the cycle, including a few weeks before the final release. This was due to Skrillex's late involvement with the project.

=== Musical style ===
In 2017, singer Brandon Boyd described the album's sound as "dark and lovely", and recalled that "[Ben and Mike] just got interested in big dirty, grimy riffs again, which is really exciting for me as someone who loves to write rock songs among other kinds of songs."

== Critical reception ==
Professional ratings
Aggregate scores
Source	Rating
Metacritic	45/100
Review scores
Source	Rating
AllMusic	3/5 stars
The A.V. Club	C
Consequence of Sound	C
GIGsoup	72%
The Guardian	2/5 stars
Newsday	B+
No Ripcord	3/10
Sputnikmusic	0.5/5 stars

According to the review aggregator Metacritic, 8 received "mixed or average reviews" based on a weighted average score of 45 out of 100 from 7 critic scores. Many listeners praised the band's return to rock with tracks like "Throw Out the Map" and "No Fun", the overall quality of production, as well as Brandon Boyd's vocal range, while others criticized the lack of personality within the album.

Kerrang! gave it a negative review in May 2017, and commented that, "8 isn't terrible, but it is boring, which is much worse." The A.V. Club awarded the album a C rating, stating that, "over the two decades that have elapsed since the band’s major-label debut, S.C.I.E.N.C.E., every new album has inched further away from the seething thud of late-’90s mook rock — an evolution that culminated, in 2011, with If Not Now, When?, closer in mid-tempo sound to late R.E.M. than anything you’d ever hear at Ozzfest." They added that, "8 walks that sonic progression back a little" and that "the band’s greatest strength and liability remains its frontman, ab-flashing surfer loverboy Brandon Boyd."

Gwilym Mumford of The Guardian gave the album two out of five stars on April 21, 2017, and observed that there is "the faint whiff of the Sheeran on a few of the big ballads here." Mumford claimed that, "the band fares better when they channel the adolescent enthusiasm of their past", noting that "'Nimble Bastard' is a tidy chunk of driving alt-rock reminiscent of Kerbdog or Rival Schools. More like that and 8 might have been a little less second-rate."

Spin's Andy Cush wrote in April 2017 that, "8 [mostly] sounds like a latter-day Incubus album — some solid songs, a little heavier than their exceedingly polite 2011 effort If Not Now, When?, a lot more refined than the swampy genre-hopping weirdness offered on their early releases." He added that, "one exception is 'When I Became a Man', a brief late-album cut that almost could have been ripped from Incubus’s fully zonked-out funk-metal debut Fungus Amongus."

=== Legacy ===
When ranking their studio albums in 2020, Kerrang! placed 8 sixth, commenting that "while this is a vast improvement upon the dismal If Not Now, When?, that doesn’t make it a return to form in any profound sense." In a 2022 Louder Sound article, Boyd also placed it sixth in his ranking of the band's studio albums, reflecting that "it was a very different writing process for us, and it has some moments on it, but we’ll listen to this sometimes in rehearsal and there are songs on it where we’re looking at each other as if we didn’t write it." Alternative Press placed it last in their ranking in 2023.

== Commercial performance ==
8 debuted at number four on the Billboard 200, moving 52,000 album-equivalent units; it sold 49,000 copies in its first week, with the remainder of its unit total reflecting the album's streaming activity and track sales. In the second week, the album dropped at No.127, but re-surfaced within the top 100 at No.53 in the third week.

== Track listing ==
All tracks are written by Incubus.

No.	Title	Length
1.	"No Fun"	3:21
2.	"Nimble Bastard"	3:39
3.	"State of the Art"	3:46
4.	"Glitterbomb"	4:45
5.	"Undefeated"	3:56
6.	"Loneliest"	3:37
7.	"When I Became a Man"	0:56
8.	"Familiar Faces"	3:26
9.	"Love in a Time of Surveillance"	4:55
10.	"Make No Sound in the Digital Forest" (instrumental)	3:23
11.	"Throw Out the Map"	4:28
Total length:		40:12

Japanese edition bonus track
No.	Title	Length
12.	"Nimble Bastard" (acoustic)	3:20
Total length:		43:32

== Personnel ==
Personnel as listed in the album's liner notes are:

=== Incubus ===
- Brandon Boyd – lead vocals, rhythm guitar, percussion, additional production (tracks 1, 3, 6–8, 10), art direction
- Michael Einziger – lead guitar, piano, backing vocals, string orchestration and arrangements, conducting, additional production (tracks 1, 3, 6–8, 10), additional engineering
- José Pasillas II – drums
- Chris Kilmore – piano, keyboards, mellotron, organ, turntables
- Ben Kenney – bass, backing vocals

=== Recording ===
- Dave Sardy – production (uncredited)
- Skrillex – co-production (tracks 1, 3, 5, 7), electric guitar, additional production (11), mixing (1–6, 8–9, 11)
- James Monti – engineer
- Cameron Barton – assistant engineer
- Matt Tuggle – 2nd engineer
- Bryan Dimaio – 3rd engineer
- Gabe Sackier – additional engineering
- Todd Hurtt – additional engineering
- Gentry Studer – mastering

=== Artwork ===
- Brantley Gutierrez – art direction, band photography
- Alberto Erazo – design

== Charts ==
Chart (2017)	Peak position
Australian Albums (ARIA)	20
Austrian Albums (Ö3 Austria)	13
Belgian Albums (Ultratop Flanders)	100
Belgian Albums (Ultratop Wallonia)	66
Canadian Albums (Billboard)	15
Dutch Albums (Album Top 100)	97
German Albums (Offizielle Top 100)	20
Italian Albums (FIMI)	44
New Zealand Heatseekers Albums (RMNZ)	3
Scottish Albums (Official Charts)	43
Spanish Albums (PROMUSICAE)	40
Swiss Albums (Schweizer Hitparade)	20
UK Albums (Official Charts)	35
US Billboard 200	4

== Release history ==
Region	Date	Format(s)	Label	Ref.
Worldwide	April 21, 2017	Digital download; streaming; CD	Island	
