= Nighttiming =

Studio album by Coconut Records
- Released: March 20, 2007
- Recorded: August 2006 at Casa Chica, Malibu, CA
- Genre: Pop rock
- Length: 33:24; 55:02 (with bonus tracks)
- Label: Young Baby
- Producers: Mike Einziger; Woodrow Wilson Jackson III

Coconut Records chronology
Nighttiming (2007)	Davy (2009)

Professional ratings
Review scores
Source	Rating
Allmusic	4/5 stars

Nighttiming is Coconut Records' 2007 debut album. It was originally released as a digital download. The album is the musical project of actor and musician Jason Schwartzman, who wrote all of the songs and performs the majority of the instruments. The album was produced by Mike Einziger of Incubus in Casa Chica in Malibu in August 2006.

CD prints of the album contain several bonus tracks, most of which are demo versions and alternate takes of songs on the album. Early copies of the CD also included unique Polaroid photographs by Schwartzman.

An official music video has been made for "West Coast". It features skateboarding performances by Mark Gonzales in Germany.

The song "Summer Day" was featured on the Spider-Man 3 original soundtrack. The song "West Coast" can be heard in an episode of The OC and can be purchased in the official season four soundtrack. The song "West Coast" also appears in the movie Cloverfield, as well as on a promotional CD for the film entitled Rob's Party Mix. It is one of the many tracks played when the party takes place. The song "Nighttiming" makes an appearance as an iTunes bonus track for the Funny People original soundtrack.

"Summer Day" and "The Thanks I Get" were also used in two 2008 advertisements for Dentyne gum.

== Track listing ==
All songs written by Jason Schwartzman.

1. "This Old Machine" – 2:01 with Kirsten Dunst
2. "West Coast" – 3:32 with Benjamin Einziger, Brenda Colonna and Brother Jack Elder
3. "Back to You" – 4:39
4. "Summer Day" – 2:07 with Kirsten Dunst
5. "Nighttiming" – 2:51
6. "Minding My Own Business" – 2:19
7. "Slowly" – 4:04 with Zooey Deschanel
8. "Mama" – 1:33 with Jennifer Furches
9. "The Thanks I Get" – 2:24
10. "It's Not You It's Me" – 2:42
11. "Easy Girl" – 2:17 with Robert Schwartzman
12. "Ask Her to Dance" – 2:55 with Zooey Deschanel

=== Bonus track listing ===
13. (Silence) – 0:58
14. "This Old Machine" (Alternate Clip) – 0:46
15. "West Coast" (Alternate Clip) – 0:39
16. "Back to You" (Part 1) (Alternate Version) – 2:10
17. "Back to You" (Part 2) (Alternate Version) – 1:06
18. "Summer Day" (Alternate Version) – 1:49
19. "Nighttiming" (Alternate Clip) – 1:10
20. "Minding My Own Business" (Alternate Version) – 3:15
21. "Slowly" (Part 1) (Alternate Version) – 2:54
22. "The Thanks I Get" (Alternate Version) – 2:16
23. "Slowly" (Part 2) (Alternate Version) – 0:44
24. "It's Not You It's Me" (Alternate Version) – 1:35
25. "Easy Girl" (Alternate Version) – 1:48
26. "Ask Her to Dance" (Alternate Version) – 1:06

== Personnel ==
=== Performance ===
- Jason Schwartzman – vocals, drums, percussion, acoustic guitar, electric guitar, piano, organ, keyboards, synthesizer, bass guitar
- Kirsten Dunst – vocals (tracks 1, 4)
- Zooey Deschanel – vocals (tracks 7, 12)
- Robert Schwartzman – vocals (track 11)
- Jennifer Furches – vocals (track 8), violin (tracks 2, 5, 7)
- Benjamin Einziger – background vocal choir (track 2)
- Branda Colonna – background vocal choir (track 2)
- Brother Jack Elder – background vocal choir (track 2)
- Danny Farrington – pedal steel guitar (track 8)
- Brandon Boyd – whistling (track 7)
- Ben Kenney – bass guitar (track 5)
- Sam Farrar – electric guitar (track 10)

=== Production ===
Nighttiming was produced and recorded by Michael Einziger at Casa Chica, Malibu, CA during August 2006, except for track 1, which was produced by Woodrow Wilson Jackson III in March 2006. The album was mixed by Brendan O'Brien at Henson Studios, assisted by Tom Syroski. String arrangements by Syd Goldstein at Fools Goldstein Records. Cover photo by Roman Coppola.
