= Trust Fall (Side B) =

EP by Incubus
- Released: April 17, 2020
- Recorded: 2019
- Genres: Alternative rock; pop rock
- Length: 19:46
- Label: Island
- Producer: Incubus

Incubus chronology
8 (2017)	Trust Fall (Side B) (2020)	Something in the Water (TBD)

Singles from Trust Fall (Side B)
- 1. "Into the Summer" Released: August 22, 2019; 2. "Our Love" Released: January 31, 2020

Trust Fall (Side B) is the fifth EP by rock band Incubus. It was released on April 17, 2020. Side B serves as a sequel to Trust Fall (Side A), which was released in 2015. It is the last studio material with bassist Ben Kenney before his departure in 2023.

== Reception ==
On October 5, 2019, Jim Shahen Jr. of the Times-Union commented that the single "Into the Summer" had a "sinewy post-disco vibe [that] fits perfectly in the modern rock landscape", further noting that it highlighted the band's "ability to move past its beginnings as a Faith No More-inspired rap-metal hybrid." Adam Grundy of Chorus.fm wrote on April 17, 2020 that "what I have always appreciated about this band is that they never make the same record twice." He added, "this record is no exception to this rule, as Incubus continues to cover new ground."

== Track listing ==
Trust Fall (Side B) track listing
No.	Title	Length
1.	"Karma, Come Back"	4:28
2.	"Our Love"	3:09
3.	"Into the Summer"	4:18
4.	"On Without Me"	4:49
5.	"Paper Cuts"	3:02
Total length:		19:46

== Personnel ==
Incubus

- Brandon Boyd – lead vocals
- Michael Einziger – guitars
- Jose Pasillas II – drums
- Chris Kilmore – piano, keyboards, turntables
- Ben Kenney – bass, backing vocals

== Charts ==
Chart performance for Trust Fall (Side B)
Chart (2020)	Peak position
US Independent Albums (Billboard)	28
US Top Album Sales (Billboard)	11
US Top Current Album Sales (Billboard)	11
US Top Alternative Albums (Billboard)	16
US Top Rock Albums (Billboard)	37
