= Dirty Sexy Knights in Paris =

Studio album by Audiovent
- Released: June 4, 2002
- Recorded: 2001
- Studios: Full Kilt Studios (Los Angeles, California); Larrabee Studios East (Los Angeles, California); Capitol Studios (Los Angeles, California)
- Genres: Alternative rock; post-grunge; hard rock; nu metal
- Length: 45:24
- Label: Atlantic
- Producer: Gavin Mackillop

Audiovent chronology
| Papa’s Dojo (1999) | Dirty Sexy Knights in Paris (2002) |

Singles from Dirty Sexy Knights in Paris
- 1. "The Energy" Released: April 9, 2002; 2. "Looking Down" Released: September 17, 2002

Dirty Sexy Knights in Paris Is the second and only major label album by alternative rock band Audiovent. It was released in 2002 on Atlantic Records. The album had two singles, "The Energy" and "Looking Down". Audiovent toured with Saliva and Theory of a Deadman in promotion of the album.

== Background ==
The band's origins trace back to the members attending middle school, when lead singer Jason Boyd began playing music with friend bassist Paul Fried. Fried's stepbrother, Benjamin Eiziger, walked in to one of their jam sessions, and joined shortly thereafter. The three had all known each other through their brother's band, Incubus, of which they were all related. Jason Boyd is the brother of vocalist Brandon Boyd, Benjamin Einziger is brother of guitarist Mike Einziger, and Paul Fried is their stepbrother. The band recruited the final part of the band, drummer Jamin Wilcox, and, upon having a solid lineup, formed the band under the name "Vent". Despite forming so early, members had just recently learned how to play their instruments, and would spend years just practicing together, playing covers of Nirvana and Metallica.

The band continued to practice together throughout high school, and began to build up a base by playing local shows. In 1999, the band financed their own independent full-length album Papa's Dojo. The album greatly increased their local popularity, something the band had difficulty coping with, leading to much in-fighting between members. The band took part in group therapy to help strengthen their communication amongst one another. The therapy and determination to keep their long-term friendships paid off, as not only was the band able to stay together, just a few months after the release of Papa's Dojo, the band received interest from multiple major record labels. The band chose Atlantic Records, the label they felt understood the band's vision and creativity the best.

== Writing and recording ==
Upon being signed to a major record label, the band decided to rename themselves as something more recognizable - "Audiovent". The band entered the studio with music producer Gavin Mackillop to record their major label album debut in 2001, though the process proved to be "slow and tedious". The majority of the album was recorded over the course of a three-month period in the studio. Initially thinking they were done, upon listening to the material, the band decided they wanted to restructure and re-record some songs, while additionally recording some new songs, that were ultimately not used in the final album. The band opted to almost entirely re-record the material from Papa's Dojo for their major label debut. The band hadn't initially planned on doing this, but went with it once they realized how well their old songs sounded when they were re-recorded in a high-tech studio with a professional producer and equipment like Pro-Tools. The process was further drawn out while they searched for a mixing engineer to provide the album's final mix they felt best complimented their sound, who ended up being Chris Lord-Alge.

== Composition and sound ==
The band purposely used a traditional "guitar, bass, and drum" rock sound in their music, in efforts to distance themselves from the DJs, rapped vocals, and angsty themes commonly found in nu metal and rap metal's music, which was at its peak of popularity upon the band's major label debut. The band desired to distance themselves from the shadow of their sibling's band Incubus, though critics commonly compared them regardless, especially to Incubus's 1999 album Make Yourself and Brandon Boyd's vocals. They did manage to avoid said band's nu metal label though, most commonly being identified as alternative rock, post-grunge, and hard rock. Music journalists noted a diversity between their songs as well, with Margo Whitman of Billboard described them as having " cuts that run the gamut from acoustic-type ballads to hardcore rock numbers".

== Release and promotion ==
The final product, Dirty Sexy Knights in Paris was released on June 4, 2002. Commercial reception was lukewarm; the album charted, but peaked at no. 156 on the Billboard 200 in 2002, staying on the chart for six weeks before dropping off. Two singles were released in support of the album, "The Energy" and "Looking Down". They too were moderately received; "The Energy" peaked at no. 17 on Billboard's Alternative Songs chart and at no. 9 on their Hot Mainstream Rock Tracks, but "Looking Down" only charted on the Hot Mainstream Chart, peaking at no. 29. Prior to the album's release, the band toured with Adema. After its release, they spent the second half of the year touring in support of the album with Saliva and Theory of a Deadman.

== Reception ==
Professional ratings
Review scores
| Source | Rating |
|---|---|
| Allmusic | 2.5/5 stars |
| Melodic | 4/5 stars |
| Silent Uproar | 4/5 stars |

The album was generally well received by critics. Allmusic acknowledged the similarities to Incubus, but overall concluded that the album was a "respectable piece of product that holds up well against similar albums". Melodic compared the album's sound favorably to Fuel, referring to it as "an electrifying record filled with tense and vibrating grooves", and ultimately concluding that "You won't be disappointed if you love modern hard rock and wants new music for your mixtapes to come....A candidate for the top 20 list this year pronto!" Silent Uproar praised the album as well, stating that "Most tracks though, are slick and well organized, and few could be huge hits. Overall, I'm impressed with Audiovent's album"

== Track listing ==
All tracks are written by Benjamin Einziger, Paul Fried, Jamin Wilcox and Jason Boyd.

| No. | Title | Length |
|---|---|---|
| 1. | "The Energy" | 4:11 |
| 2. | "Looking Down" | 3:58 |
| 3. | "I Can't Breathe" | 3:20 |
| 4. | "Rain" | 3:57 |
| 5. | "One Small Choice" | 2:59 |
| 6. | "Sweet Frustration" | 3:22 |
| 7. | "Stalker" | 3:17 |
| 8. | "Gravity" | 3:40 |
| 9. | "Underwater Silence" | 4:43 |
| 10. | "Back and Forth" | 3:26 |
| 11. | "Beautiful Addiction" | 3:57 |
| 12. | "When I Drown" | 4:33 |

Japanese bonus track
| No. | Title | Length |
|---|---|---|
| 13. | "When I Drown (Piano/Strings Version)" | 4:36 |

== Personnel ==
Band

- Jason Boyd - vocals
- Benjamin Einziger - guitar, vocals, sitar on "Rain"
- Paul Fried - bass, vocals
- Jamin Wilcox - drums, vocals

== Chart performance ==
| Year | Single | Peak chart positions | | | Album |
| Year | Single | US Alt. | US Main. | UK | Album |
|---|---|---|---|---|---|
| 2002 | "The Energy" | 17 | 9 | 167 | Dirty Sexy Knights in Paris |
| 2002 | "Looking Down" | — | 29 | — | Dirty Sexy Knights in Paris |
"—" denotes a release that did not chart.
