= Trust Fall (Side A) =

EP by Incubus
- Released: May 12, 2015
- Recorded: 2014–15
- Genre: Alternative rock
- Length: 20:18
- Label: Island
- Producer: Mike Einziger, Brandon Boyd

Incubus chronology
If Not Now, When? (2011)	''Trust Fall (Side A)'' (2015)	8 (2017)

Singles from Trust Fall (Side A)
- 1. "Absolution Calling" Released: February 5, 2015

Professional ratings
Review scores
Source	Rating
Sputnikmusic	3.2/5

Trust Fall (Side A) is a four-track EP by alternative rock band Incubus, released in 2015 on Island Records. It was the first release from the band since their 2011 album, If Not Now, When?.

Trust Fall (Side B), a follow-up to this EP, was released in 2020.

== Background ==
The writing and production of the EP began in late 2014 following a Sons of the Seas tour fronted by Brandon Boyd. The EP was the first of "at least two" EPs that Incubus planned to release in 2015; they ultimately did not release a second EP that year. Brandon Boyd and Mike Einziger stated in an interview for #Letstalkmusic that the EP format was chosen so they could release some new songs prior to a tour, then finish the rest of the album when they returned.

== Promotion ==
The lead single from the EP, "Absolution Calling", debuted on KROQ. It was followed by a music video.

Trust Fall (Side A) was supported by a 2015 Summer tour in the United States, following an earlier tour in 2015 through Australia and Southeast Asia.

== Track listing ==
No.	Title	Length
1.	"Trust Fall"	6:23
2.	"Make Out Party"	4:50
3.	"Absolution Calling"	4:37
4.	"Dance Like You're Dumb"	4:26
Total length:		20:18

== Personnel ==
Credits adapted from EP's liner notes.

Incubus

- Brandon Boyd – lead vocals, rhythm guitar, melodies, percussion, producer, engineer
- Michael Einziger – lead guitar, piano, backing vocals, string orchestration and arrangements, conducting, producer, engineer
- Jose Pasillas II – drums, engineer
- Chris Kilmore – piano, keyboards, Mellotron, organ, turntables, engineer
- Ben Kenney – bass guitar, backing vocals, engineer

Additional personnel

- Seth Waldmann – engineer
- Matthew O'Driscoll – assistant engineer
- Dave Holdredge – additional engineering
- Dave Sardy – mixing
- Cameron Barton – mix engineer
- Stephen Marcussen – mastering

Artwork

- Brandon Boyd – art direction
- Brian Bowen Smith – photography

== Charts ==
Chart performance for Trust Fall (Side A)
Chart (2015)	Peak position
US Billboard 200	6
US Top Album Sales (Billboard)	3
US Top Current Album Sales (Billboard)	3
US Top Alternative Albums (Billboard)	2
US Top Rock Albums (Billboard)	2
US Top Hard Rock Albums (Billboard)	1
US Tastemaker Albums (Billboard)	1
