= The Energy =

Single by Audiovent

from the album Dirty Sexy Knights in Paris
- Released: April 9, 2002
- Recorded: 2001
- Length: 4:11
- Label: Atlantic
- Songwriters: Jason Boyd, Benjamin Einziger, Paul Fried, Jamin Wilcox
- Producer: Gavin Mackillop

Audiovent singles chronology
"The Energy" (2002)	"Looking Down" (2002)

"The Energy" is the lead single from their only major record label album Dirty Sexy Knights in Paris by alternative rock band Audiovent. The song was a top ten hit on the Billboard Hot Mainstream Rock Tracks chart in 2002, and broke into the top 20 of the Billboard Alternative Songs chart as well.

== Background ==
The majority of the band's major record label debut, Dirty Sexy Knights in Paris, actually originates from the album Papa's Dojo, the early material the band released in their early days under the moniker "Vent". "The Energy" was one of only a few new tracks not originating from those sessions, but rather, written explicitly for the new album. The song was the band's first to be sent to rock radio, and the first single as well. It was also included on the soundtrack for the video games Madden 2003, Disney's Extreme Skate Adventure, Splashdown: Rides Gone Wild, and BMX XXX.

== Themes and composition ==
Boyd states that the lyrics were inspired by a difficult break up he was going through upon recording the song. Boyd stated that writing the song helped him work through his emotions on the departure.

"'Energy' and a lot of the record was written during the breakup, and that song in particular is about my realization that I can't be dependent on any one person except myself. It's just a constant reminder of where I was at that point in my life and now the song just lets me know that I can't get back there again."

He explains that "The Energy" is in reference to having the energy to be self-sufficient, and not dependent on any one person. MTV described the lyrics as " a misty reverie to a full-throttle venting session" while describing its sound as having "propulsive guitars, emotionally expressive vocals and galvanic rhythms".

== Reception ==
Margo Whitmire of Billboard magazine praised the track for its "deep lyrics and electric musical energy". Conversely, Allmusic and Uproxx criticized the track for a lack of perceived energy, especially considering the song's title.

== Personnel ==
Band

- Jason Boyd - vocals
- Benjamin Einziger - guitar, vocals
- Paul Fried - bass, vocals
- Jamin Wilcox - drums, vocals

== Chart performance ==
Year	Single	Peak chart positions		
Year	Single	US Alt.	US Main.	UK
2002	"The Energy"	17	9	167
