= Time-Lapse Consortium =

- Origin: Los Angeles, California, United States
- Genres: Psychedelic, jazz, funk
- Years active: 2003
- Labels: Epic Records
- Members: Mike Einziger; José Pasillas; Ben Kenney; Neal Evans; Suzie Katayama

Time-Lapse Consortium was an American band formed in 2003. Their sound is described as psychedelic, jazz, and funk. The group consists of current Incubus members Mike Einziger on guitar, José Pasillas on drums, Ben Kenney on bass (although he was not a member of Incubus at the time of joining Time Lapse Consortium), Neal Evans of Soulive on Organ, and Suzie Katayama contributing on string arrangements.

== Biography ==
Time-Lapse Consortium was created in 2003 by Einziger after his main group Incubus took a break after supporting their 2001 release Morning View. Einziger describes his ideas on the band's Myspace page.

"Time-Lapse Consortium is an idea that had been swirling around in my brain for quite some time. For years I've been fascinated by the great bandleaders and arrangers of the 50s and 60s. People such as Quincy Jones, Esquivel, Sérgio Mendes, etc.... With all of those instruments, it's like being able to paint a picture with many different colors. It's a very different experience from writing music for a standard rock and roll setup."

The band performed their first show at the Roxy Theater in Hollywood, California on January 24, 2003. Despite only three days of rehearsal beforehand, the band played before an excited and packed crowd. The show was recorded, and shortly thereafter 10,000 CDs were released to ShopBootlegs.com by Epic Records, all of which were sold quickly. They performed again on August 29, 2003, at the Knitting Factory in New York City. The musicians returned to their respective projects after the show, but thanks to the continued popularity of Incubus and music downloading the album continues to have a strong following and a growing fanbase.

"A Certain Shade of Green" by Incubus was played in the same style as heard on Monuments and Melodies, also appeared on Time Lapse Consortium's album entitled Live at the Roxy Theater in 2003 (albeit an electric version). Brandon Boyd was the featured "guest" singer.

== Track listing ==
No.	Title	Length
1.	"Grimace"	5:04
2.	"Cholula"	4:56
3.	"Come Back Boomerang"	2:47
4.	"Flapjack"	4:49
5.	"TCB'n"	5:12
6.	"I Done Already Been Up In There"	4:48
7.	"A Certain Shade of Green (Incubus, cover from S.C.I.E.N.C.E.)"	3:48
8.	"Patrollin'"	5:33
9.	"Mai Tai"	5:27
10.	"Tres Puntos"	4:37
