= Davy (album) =

Studio album by Coconut Records
- Released: January 20, 2009
- Recorded: 2008
- Genre: Indie pop, indie rock
- Length: 28:06
- Label: Young Baby

Coconut Records chronology
| Nighttiming (2007) | Davy (2009) |

Singles from Davy
- 1. "Microphone" Released: December 2008; 2. "Saint Jerome" Released: Spring 2009; 3. "The Summer" Released: June 2009

Professional ratings
Review scores
| Source | Rating |
|---|---|
| AllMusic | 4/5 stars |
| AbsolutePunk | (82%) |
| Pitchfork Media | (5.9/10) |
| PopMatters | 8/10 stars |
| Snob's Music | (8.5/10) |
| SSW | 5/6 stars |
| Sun on the Sand | (7/10) |

Davy is Coconut Records' 2009 second release. The album is, as was Nighttiming, the product of Jason Schwartzman, who wrote all of the songs and performs the majority of the instruments.

The first official single for the album was "Microphone." The song was also used in the 2012 film LOL, starring Miley Cyrus and subsequently featured on the soundtrack. A portion of "Any Fun" is in a teaser video on the Coconut Records MySpace page. The track listing and album art first appeared on the independent online music store Amie Street.

Like Nighttiming, the CD pressing of Davy contains demo and alternate versions of the album's songs after the final track.

The songs "Wires" and "I Am Young" were featured on the Funny People original soundtrack.

Two music videos were made for this album; "Microphone" and "Any Fun."

== Cover art ==
The album's artwork was inspired by the book cover of the Penguin Books' edition of Aldous Huxley's novel Island.

== Track listing ==
All songs written by Jason Schwartzman.

1. "Microphone" – 2:53
2. "Drummer" – 2:55
3. "Any Fun" – 2:56
4. "Saint Jerome" – 2:49
5. "Courtyard" – 2:14
6. "Wandering Around" – 2:41
7. "The Summer" – 2:45
8. "I Am Young" – 3:11
9. "Wires" – 2:35
10. "Is This Sound Okay?" – 3:07

=== Bonus track listing ===
11. (Silence)
12. "Untitled"
13. "Drummer (Alternate Version)"
14. "Any Fun (Alternate Instrumental Version)"
15. "Saint Jerome (Alternate Version)"
16. "Courtyard (Alternate Version)"
17. "Courtyard (Alternate Instrumental Version)"
18. "Wandering Around (Alternate Version)"
19. "Wandering Around (Alternate Version 2)"
20. "The Summer (Alternate Version)"
21. "I Am Young (Alternate Version)"
22. "I Am Young (Alternate 'Let It Go' Version)"
23. "Wires (Alternate Version)"
