= Agent Sparks =

American indie pop band (2005–2007)

- Origin: Calabasas, California, U.S.
- Genres: Indie pop
- Years active: 2005–2007
- Label: Immortal
- Spinoffs: Bubble and Strife
- Spinoff of: Audiovent
- Past members: Benjamin Einziger; Stephanie Eitel; Paul Fried; George Purviance

Agent Sparks was an American indie pop band formed in early 2005 when two former bandmates from Audiovent decided they wanted to continue making music. Members include Benjamin Einziger (lead vocals, guitar), Stephanie Eitel (lead vocals, keyboard, percussion), Paul Fried (bass, vocals), and George Purviance (drums, vocals).

They released their sole EP entitled Not So Merry in September 2005. This EP included, "It's Not My Time," "Choke," and "So Long Darlings." On June 20, 2006, they released their lone studio album Red Rover. Both their EP and album were produced by Ben's brother and Paul's stepbrother, Incubus guitarist Michael Einziger. The band later went on to tour with bands Thirty Seconds to Mars and Veruca Salt. After releasing the aforementioned album, and embarking on a cross-country tour with Hoobastank, the band broke up. Shortly after Agent Sparks disbanded, in 2007, Eitel married Phantom Planet and Maroon 5 bassist Sam Farrar (with whom she subsequently formed the project Bubble and Strife) and have gone on to have two children together, and is the daughter-in-law of Australian musicians John Farrar and Pat Carroll and the sister-in-law of musician, composer and producer Max Farrar, who is the keyboardist and guitarist of the rock band Azura, and whose work also ranges from The Script to Lewis Capaldi.

== Discography ==
=== Studio albums ===
- Red Rover (2006)

=== EPs ===
- Not So Merry (2005)
