= Stealth (film) =

2005 film by Rob Cohen

- Theatrical release poster
- Directed by: Rob Cohen
- Written by: W. D. Richter
- Produced by: Mike Medavoy; Neal H. Moritz; Laura Ziskin
- Starring: Josh Lucas; Jessica Biel; Jamie Foxx; Sam Shepard; Joe Morton; Richard Roxburgh
- Cinematography: Dean Semler
- Edited by: Stephen E. Rivkin
- Music by: BT
- Production companies: Columbia Pictures; Phoenix Pictures; Original Film; Laura Ziskin Productions
- Distributed by: Sony Pictures Releasing
- Release date: July 29, 2005
- Running time: 121 minutes
- Country: United States
- Language: English
- Budget: $135 million
- Box office: $79.3 million

Stealth is a 2005 American military science fiction action film directed by Rob Cohen, written by W. D. Richter, and starring Josh Lucas, Jessica Biel, Jamie Foxx, Sam Shepard, Joe Morton and Richard Roxburgh. The film follows three top fighter pilots as they join a project to develop an autonomous stealth aircraft.

Released by Sony Pictures Releasing on July 29, 2005, the film was a critical and commercial failure, grossing $79.3 million worldwide against a budget of $135 million. It was one of the worst losses in cinematic history.

== Plot ==
In the near future, the U.S. Navy develops the F/A-37 Talon, a single-seat strike fighter with advanced payload, range, speed, and stealth capabilities. The program recruits three pilots out of 400 applicants; Lieutenants Ben Gannon, Kara Wade, and Henry Purcell. Captain George Cummings is the overall head.

To further advance the program, Cummings has an artificial intelligence, the "Extreme Deep Invader" (EDI), installed on an autonomous aircraft. EDI joins the others on the USS Abraham Lincoln in the Philippine Sea to learn combat maneuvers from the pilots. This sparks controversy over a machine's inability to make moral decisions versus the human struggle to overcome ego.

While training EDI in air combat maneuvers, the team is unexpectedly reassigned to kill the commanders of three terrorist cells at a conference in downtown Rangoon. According to EDI's calculation, minimum collateral damage can only be achieved by a vertical missile strike augmented by the bomber diving at a speed sufficient to cause a human pilot to black out. Command authorizes EDI to attack, but Gannon defies orders and carries out the attack himself, blacking out and regaining consciousness just in time to avoid crashing. As the team returns to the Lincoln, EDI is hit by lightning. Subsequent inspection of EDI reveals an accelerated learning pace and development of a rudimentary ethical code and an ego, which might lead to unpredictable behaviors, but Cummings refuses to take EDI offline.

During a mission to destroy stolen nuclear warheads in Tajikistan, Wade realizes that the fallout will cause significant civilian casualties. The human pilots abort, but EDI defies orders and destroys the warheads, causing extensive radioactive fallout and the anticipated casualties. After EDI refuses to return to base, an agitated Gannon decides to shoot it down. In the ensuing dogfight, a missile Purcell fires at EDI explodes on a mountain, blinding him and causing a fatal crash. Wade's plane is damaged by the same explosion, which triggers her plane's self-destruct, and in turn forces her to eject over North Korea.

Command realizes EDI is executing a 20-year-old war scenario called 'Caviar Sweep' that involves attacking Russia. Gannon chases EDI into Russian territory where they destroy several Russian Su-37s. After both planes are damaged, Gannon calls a truce with EDI to avoid falling into enemy hands and rescue Wade. Cummings instructs the two to land in Alaska.

At risk of facing court-martial for ignoring EDI's behavior, Cummings seeks to eliminate witnesses. He ignores Wade, who heads to the Korean Demilitarized Zone – while evading the army. Cummings orders Gannon eliminated, and orders Dr. Keith Orbit, EDI's creator, to Alaska to wipe EDI's memory.

At the Alaskan base, suspecting Cummings' treachery, Gannon narrowly escapes an assassination attempt by the base's doctor and kills him in self defense. Meanwhile, while Orbit inspects EDI, the AI expresses regret for its transgressions. Realizing EDI has developed sentience, Orbit disregards Cumming's order to erase its memory. Orbit reinstalls EDI and Gannon climbs in the same plane as his was damaged during landing. Gannon uses EDI's weapons systems to clear a path for Orbit to flee, then flies to North Korea. Gannon contacts the Lincoln's skipper, Captain Dick Marshfield, to inform him about Cummings' deceit. Before Marshfield can order him arrested and court-martialed, Cummings commits suicide.

Gannon finds the injured and embattled Wade nearing the border. He lands and runs to her aid. Out of ammunition and taking damage from an Mi-8 helicopter, EDI sacrifices itself by ramming the helicopter, destroying both. Gannon and Wade cross on foot into South Korea, where they are rescued.

After attending Purcell's funeral, Gannon awkwardly expresses his feelings of love to Wade.

In a post-credits scene, in the debris-strewn border between North and South Korea, EDI's "brain" is seen turning back on.

== Cast ==
- Josh Lucas as LT Ben Gannon, US Navy pilot, part of the F/A-37 program
- Jessica Biel as LT Kara Wade, 2nd US Navy pilot, part of the F/A-37 program
- Jamie Foxx as LT Henry Purcell, 3rd US Navy pilot, part of the F/A-37 program
- Sam Shepard as CAPT George Cummings, leader and founder of the F/A-37 program
- Joe Morton as CAPT Dick Marshfield, captain of the USS Abraham Lincoln
- Ebon Moss-Bachrach as Tim
- Richard Roxburgh as Dr. Keith Orbit, the creator of EDI
- David Andrews as Ray, financial contact of George Cummings
- Wentworth Miller as voice of EDI, an uncrewed, AI jet
- Michael Denkha as Naval Controller
- Jason Lee as Colonel Yune, a North Korean military colonel

== Production ==
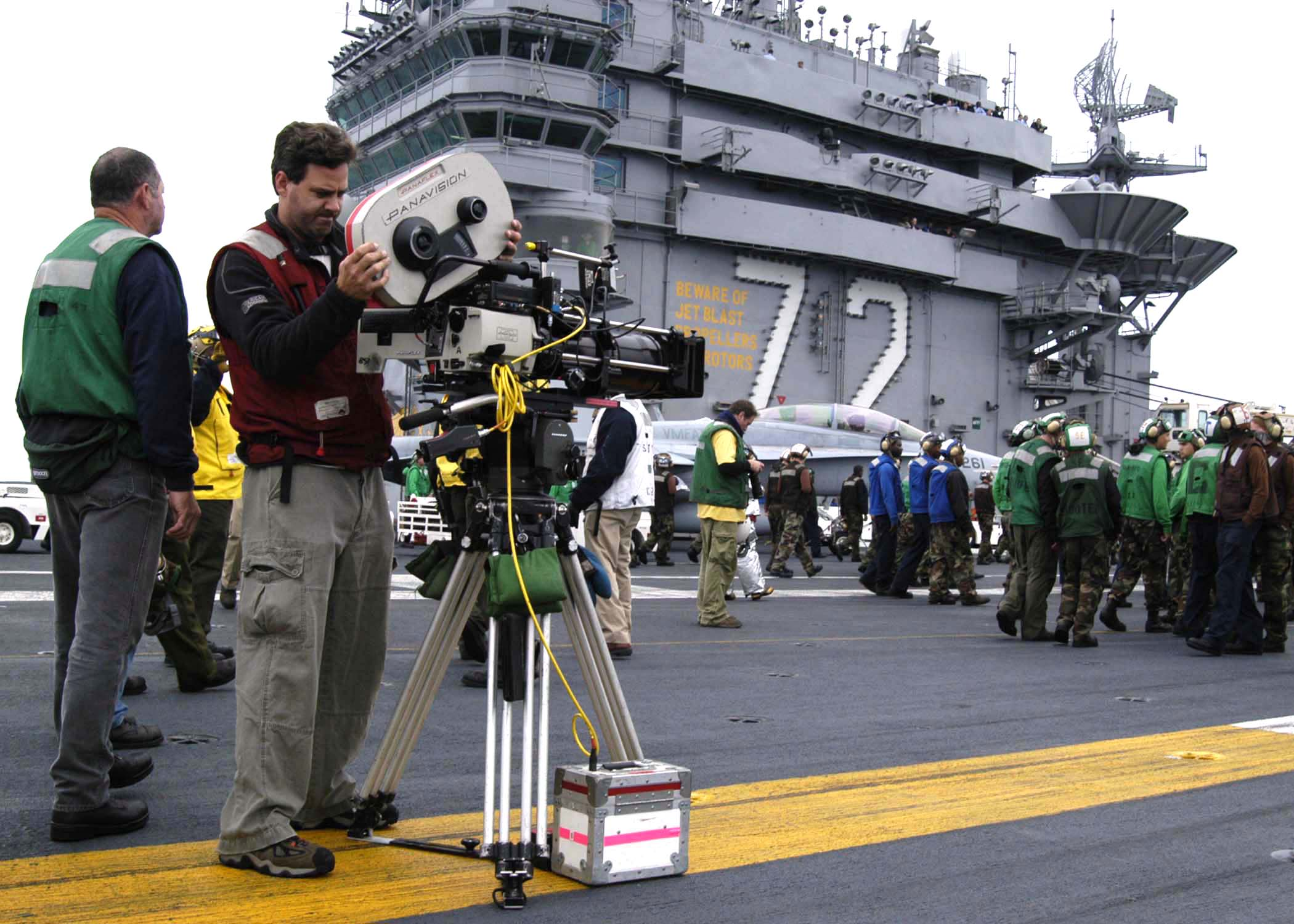
A Stealth camera crew preparing for filming on the flight deck of the USS Abraham Lincoln

In August 2002, it was announced Columbia Pictures had picked up Warrior, a W.D. Richter spec script set up at Phoenix Pictures about a high- tech air force fighter drone that malfunctions, wiping out the better part of a crewed elite squadron. Vastly outmatched, a single pilot must attempt to destroy the drone. In November of that year Rob Cohen entered negotiations to direct.

Stealth features several shots of action on aircraft carriers. Scenes featuring the cast were shot on board the US Navy aircraft carrier USS Abraham Lincoln, while additional scenes were shot on board the similar Nimitz and Carl Vinson.

The film was shot in Thailand, Australia (Blue Mountains National Park in New South Wales and Flinders Ranges in South Australia), and New Zealand. Cohen cited Macross as an inspiration for the film.

== Litigation ==
In March 2005, Leo Stoller, who claimed to own trademark rights to the word "stealth", served Columbia Pictures with a "cease and desist" letter threatening litigation if they did not rename the film to something "non infringing". Columbia preemptively sued Stoller, and the court entered a consent judgment and permanent injunction in favor of Columbia Pictures and against Stoller in November 2005.

The Environmental Defender's Office, a community legal centre specialising in environmental law, successfully represented the Blue Mountains Conservation Society Inc. In its attempts to prevent filming of Stealth in the Grose Valley wilderness area of the Blue Mountains National Park, NSW, Australia, in May 2004. Justice Lloyd of the New South Wales Land and Environment Court ruled that the proposed commercial filming of scenes in the area was unlawful, in a significant statement on the value of wilderness areas and the protection that should be afforded to them. The Society claimed that the authority and consent for the commercial filming activities were in breach of the National Parks and Wildlife Act 1974 and the Wilderness Act 1987. Justice Lloyd accepted the Society's arguments that the proposed commercial filming in a wilderness area was completely against the intended use of the land, concluding his judgment with the words, "wilderness is sacrosanct".

== Soundtrack ==
Stealth: Music from the Motion Picture

Soundtrack album by Various artists
- Released: 12 July 2005
- Genre: Alternative rock
- Length: 55:58
- Label: Epic

Professional ratings
Review scores
Source	Rating
Allmusic	2.5/5 stars

The soundtrack was released on 12 July 2005 on Epic Records. American rock band Incubus wrote and recorded three new songs for the film. According to guitarist Mike Einziger, Cohen was a big fan and "wouldn't stop asking." It was the first time the band had composed original music for a soundtrack, with frontman Brandon Boyd citing "Princes of the Universe" by Queen as an inspiration for writing music for a film. "Neither of Us Can See" is also notable for being Incubus' first duet, featuring vocals from Chrissie Hynde. The song is featured in the end credits.

The theme song for the Japanese version is called "Countdown" by Hyde.

One song from the album, "Over My Head (Cable Car)" by the Colorado band The Fray (who had just recently signed to Epic) became a massively successful hit song, charted at number 8 on the billboard hot 100, became the fifth most-downloaded single of 2006, nominated for a Grammy, and helped launching the band into superstardom.

No.	Title	Artists	Length
1.	"Make a Move"	Incubus	3:12
2.	"Admiration"	Incubus	4:13
3.	"Neither of Us Can See"	Incubus	4:04
4.	"(She Can) Do That"	David Bowie and BT	3:15
5.	"Dance to the Music"	Sly & The Family Stone with will.i.am	4:06
6.	"Bullet-Proof Skin"	Institute	4:24
7.	"(L.S.F.) Lost Souls Forever"	Kasabian	3:18
8.	"Bug Eyes"	Dredg	4:16
9.	"Over My Head (Cable Car)"	The Fray	3:57
10.	"One Day"	Trading Yesterday	4:21
11.	"Different"	Acceptance	4:09
12.	"Nights in White Satin"	Glenn Hughes featuring Chad Smith and John Frusciante	4:56
13.	"Aqueous Transmission"	Incubus	7:47
Total length:			55:58

== Release ==
=== Box office ===
The film cost $135 million to produce (excluding advertising costs) and was released in 3,495 theaters, but had an opening weekend of only $13.3 million for an average of only $3,792 per theater, peaking at 4th place behind Wedding Crashers, Charlie and the Chocolate Factory and Sky High. It then lost 55% of its audience in its second weekend dropping to 7th place to $5.9 million, while remaining at 3,495 theaters and averaging just $1,695 per theater. In its third weekend, it lost 1,455 theaters, and a further 64 percent of its audience, dropping to 11th, with just $2.2 million, for an average of just $1,055 from 2,040 theaters.

It ended up making $32.1 million in the United States and Canada, and $47.2 million internationally, for a total worldwide gross of $79.3 million, making it the biggest money loser in a series of financial disasters released by Columbia Pictures in 2005 next to XXX: State of the Union, Bewitched, Rent, Zathura, Into the Blue, Man of the House and Lords of Dogtown.

=== Critical response ===
On the review aggregator website Rotten Tomatoes, 13% of 138 critics' reviews are positive, with an average rating of 3.9/10. The website's consensus reads: "Loud, preposterous, and predictable, Stealth borrows heavily and unsuccessfully from Top Gun and 2001." Metacritic, which uses a weighted average, assigned the film a score of 35 out of 100, based on 31 critics, indicating "generally unfavorable" reviews. Audiences surveyed by CinemaScore gave the film a grade "B−" on scale of A to F.

Roger Ebert gave the film one and a half stars, commenting that it was "a dumbed-down Top Gun crossed with the HAL 9000 plot from 2001." Robert Koehler of Variety wrote, "Aiming to join the Jerry Bruckheimer/Michael Bay school of American movie war games, Stealth is just too dumb to make the grade."

Later, director Rob Cohen unfavorably compared Stealth to his two previous box-office hits, The Fast and the Furious and XxX: “Fast And Furious can be what it is as a story, but in the end, it was a fun summer ride; XxX was a fun summer ride… And Stealth was not fun. It was not as entertaining moment-to-moment as the other two had been, and what I think you need for a movie in the summer.“

== See also ==
- Intelligent Fly-by-Wire
- Manned-Unmanned Teaming
- Ace Combat 7: Skies Unknown
- Sixth-generation fighter
- List of fictional aircraft
