= Megalomaniac (Incubus song) =

2003 single by Incubus

Single by Incubus

from the album A Crow Left of the Murder...
- B-side: "Monuments and Melodies"
- Released: December 23, 2003
- Recorded: 2003
- Studio: Southern Tracks (Atlanta)
- Length: 4:24 (radio edit); 4:54 (album version)
- Label: Epic; Immortal
- Songwriters: Brandon Boyd; Mike Einziger; Ben Kenney; Chris Kilmore; José Pasillas
- Producer: Brendan O'Brien

Incubus singles chronology
"Are You In?" (2002)	"Megalomaniac" (2003)	"Talk Shows on Mute" (2004)

Music video
- "Megalomaniac" on YouTube

"Megalomaniac" is a song by the American rock band Incubus, from their 2004 album A Crow Left of the Murder... It was released as a single in December 2003, and eventually reached the top of Billboard's Modern Rock Tracks, where it stayed for a six-week period. Outside the United States, the song reached the top 30 in Italy, New Zealand, and the United Kingdom.

== Lyrical interpretation ==
Lead singer Brandon Boyd says the song is not specifically targeting anybody - the song's meaning pertains to megalomaniacs in general with a particular emphasis on El Guapo from the American comedy film Three Amigos.

== Music video ==
The video shows images of Adolf Hitler interspersed with shots of the band and of many people who are protesting. As the video progresses, officers are sent to disperse the crowd. The speaker's podium rises very high - then it is revealed that the podium is actually a gas pump. The gas pump spurts oil over the crowd, while the main figure's head is consumed by a bald eagle and starts eating people that turned into fish.

== Track listing ==
US/EU CD single

1. "Megalomaniac" (Radio Edit)
2. "Monuments and Melodies"
3. "Pistola" (Live at Lollapalooza 2003)

== Charts ==
=== Weekly charts ===
Weekly chart performance for "Megalomaniac"
Chart (2004)	Peak position
Australia (ARIA)	36
Canada Rock Top 30 (Radio & Records)	9
Germany (GfK)	70
Ireland (IRMA)	37
Italy (FIMI)	21
Netherlands (Single Top 100)	98
New Zealand (Recorded Music NZ)	30
Scotland Singles (OCC)	21
UK Singles (OCC)	23
UK Rock & Metal (OCC)	8
US Billboard Hot 100	55
US Mainstream Rock (Billboard)	2
US Alternative Airplay (Billboard)	1

=== Year-end charts ===
Year-end chart performance for "Megalomaniac"
Chart (2004)	Position
US Mainstream Rock Tracks (Billboard)	10
US Modern Rock Tracks (Billboard)	1
