= Promises, Promises (Incubus song) =

Single by Incubus

from the album If Not Now, When?
- B-side: "Rebel Girls"
- Released: 31 May 2011
- Recorded: 2010–2011
- Genre: Piano rock; pop rock
- Length: 4:26
- Label: Epic
- Songwriter(s): Incubus
- Producer(s): Brendan O'Brien

Incubus singles chronology
"Adolescents" (2011)	"Promises, Promises" (2011)	"Absolution Calling" (2015)

Music video
- "Promises, Promises" on YouTube

"Promises, Promises" is the second single released by the American alternative rock band, Incubus from their seventh studio album, If Not Now, When? The single was released in 2011.

== Song meaning ==
According to Incubus lead vocalist, Brandon Boyd: "Promises, Promises, is a story about a girl and a guy – go figure – and the girl has built up so much armor around herself with the things that she knows how to do...And so, I used these metaphors in the song of, like, magic, like she's an illusionist, so she creates these illusions around her...And she's gotten so good at it that she meets somebody who potentially could be someone that could help her break through those illusions and those walls, she can't really recognize that he could be the real thing, or they could be the real thing, so she's asking him for one thing: 'Don't make me any promises."

== Track listing ==
Promotional Single

1. "Promises, Promises" (Album Version)

7" single

1. "Promises, Promises" (Album Version)
2. "Rebel Girls"

== Chart performance ==
"Promises, Promises" peaked at No. 13 on the Billboard Alternative Songs chart and No. 24 on the Billboard Rock Songs chart.
