= Looking Down =

Single by Audiovent

from the album Dirty Sexy Knights in Paris
- Released: September 17, 2002
- Recorded: 2001
- Length: 4:11
- Label: Atlantic
- Songwriters: Jason Boyd, Benjamin Einziger, Paul Fried, Jamin Wilcox
- Producer: Gavin Mackillop

Audiovent singles chronology
"The Energy" (2002)	"Looking Down" (2002)

"Looking Down" is the second and final single from their only major record label album, Dirty Sexy Knights in Paris, by the alternative rock band Audiovent. The song appeared on the Billboard Hot Mainstream Rock Tracks chart in 2002, peaking at no. 29, but was unable to match the top 10 performance of its predecessor, "The Energy", released earlier in the year.

== Background ==
The song originated from the 1999 album Papa's Dojo, released independently while the band was still performing under their original name, Vent. For the band's major label debut, Dirty Sexy Knights in Paris, the band decided to rework much of Papa's Dojo once they had the funding to use a professional studio and music producer, Gavin Mackillop. The band chose "Looking Down" as the album's second single, after "The Energy", and released an accompanying music video in October 2002.

== Themes and composition ==
Vocalist Jason Boyd stated that the song was self-referential in relation to the band's ties to the band Incubus. He stated "[It] kind of has to do with the whole Incubus thing... It's about how we are gonna set ourselves apart in time and we’re gonna make it. We’re gonna do what we set out to do from the very beginning. It’s kind of our inspiration song as a band."

== Reception ==
Margo Whitmire of Billboard described the track as a "lyrically haunting" look at "the unfettered freedoms that true independence can bring". MTV described the song's sound as "a triumphant cut" due to it combining of "echoey guitars", "restrained vocals with more agitated tones", and featuring the chorus, "We’ll stand on top of the world looking down." Many critics compared Jason Boyd's vocals to his brother's vocals, Brandon Boyd of Incubus, with "Looking Down" commonly cited the track as being the most clear-cut example of this.

== Personnel ==
Band

- Jason Boyd - lead vocals
- Benjamin Einziger - guitar, backing vocals
- Paul Fried -bass
- Jamin Wilcox - drums

== Chart performance ==
Year	Single	Peak chart positions
Year	Single	US Mainstream Rock Tracks
2002	"Looking Down"	29
