= Audiovent =

American rock band

- Also known as: Vent
- Origin: Calabasas, California, U.S.
- Genres: Alternative rock, post-grunge, hard rock
- Years active: 1993–2007, 2018–2019, 2023–present
- Label: CAYA
- Spinoffs: Agent Sparks
- Members: Jason Boyd; Benjamin Einziger; Paul Fried; Shane McLafferty
- Past members: Jamin Wilcox; Ryland Steen

Audiovent (originally Vent) is an American alternative rock band from Calabasas, California. Initially forming as Vent in the early 1990s, the band changed their name to Audiovent upon signing with Atlantic Records in 2001. The band released their one and only album on a major record label, Dirty Sexy Knights in Paris, in 2002. Two singles were released to rock radio and charted with moderate success: "The Energy" and "Looking Down". The band began work on a second album in 2003, demoing over 19 tracks over the course of the year, but disbanded in mid-2004 before the album could be formally recorded due to creative differences between band members. They reformed in 2017 for several reunion shows, then began writing and recording new material in 2022. They released a new single, "Sleepless Machine", in late 2023.

== History ==
=== Formation as Vent and Papa's Dojo (1993–2000) ===
The band's origins trace back to the members attending middle school, when lead singer Jason Boyd began playing music with friend bassist Paul Fried. Fried's stepbrother, Benjamin Einziger, walked into one of their jam sessions, and joined shortly thereafter. The three had all known each other through their brothers' band, Incubus, of which they were all related. Jason Boyd is the brother of vocalist Brandon Boyd, Benjamin Einziger is brother of guitarist Mike Einziger, and Paul Fried is their stepbrother. The band recruited the final part of the band, drummer Jamin Wilcox, and, upon having a solid lineup, formed the band under the name "Vent". Despite forming so early, members had just recently learned how to play their instruments, and would spend years just practicing together, playing covers of Nirvana and Metallica.

The band continued to practice together throughout high school, and began to build up a base by playing local shows. In 1999, the band financed their own independent full-length album Papa's Dojo. The album greatly increased their local popularity, something the band had difficulty coping with, leading to much in-fighting between members. The band took part in group therapy to help strengthen their communication amongst one another. The therapy and determination to keep their long-term friendships paid off, as not only was the band able to stay together, just a few months after the release of Papa's Dojo, the band received interest from multiple major record labels. The band chose Atlantic Records, the label they felt understood the band's vision and creativity the best.

=== Major label debut (2001–2002) ===
Upon being signed to a major record label, the band decided to rename themselves as something more recognizable - "Audiovent". The band met with over ten record producers, before deciding to enter the studio with music producer Gavin Mackillop to record their major label album debut in 2001, though the process proved to be "slow and tedious". The majority of the album was recorded over the course of a three-month period in the studio. Initially thinking they were done, upon listening to the material, the band decided they wanted to restructure and re-record some songs, while additionally recording some new songs, that were ultimately not used in the final album. The band opted to almost entirely re-record the material from Papa's Dojo for their major label debut. The band hadn't initially planned on doing this, but went with it once they realized how well their old songs sounded when they were re-recorded in a high-tech studio with a professional producer and equipment like Pro-Tools. The process was further drawn out while they searched for a mixing engineer to provide the album's final mix they felt best complemented their sound, who ended up being Chris Lord-Alge.

The final product, Dirty Sexy Knights in Paris was released on June 4, 2002. Commercial reception was lukewarm; the album charted, but peaked at no. 156 on the Billboard 200 in 2002, staying on the chart for six weeks before dropping off. Two singles were released in support of the album, "The Energy" and "Looking Down". They too were moderately received; "The Energy" peaked at no. 17 on Billboard's Alternative Songs chart and at no. 9 on their Hot Mainstream Rock Tracks, but "Looking Down" only charted on the Hot Mainstream Chart, peaking at no. 29. Prior to the album's release, the band toured with Adema. After its release, they spent the second half of the year touring in support of the album with Saliva, Theory of a Deadman, and Our Lady Peace. The band finished out the year in December by playing a live show broadcast on MTV called "Live at the Rock & Roll Hall of Fame".

=== Aborted second album, breakup, and reunion (2003–2023) ===
By 2003, sales and airplay of their debut material had stalled, prompting the band to start writing material for a followup. The lack of success, and return to the creative process, began to cause friction in the band once again. Einziger reflected on the state of the band:

There was never a lot of synergy in Audiovent ... The band members wouldn't compromise on artistic agendas. There was a conflict every time we turned around. It was like pulling teeth to get anything done."

Wilcox was the first casualty of this, leaving the band in March 2003 due to creative differences. He was replaced by Ryland Steen, of the ska punk band Reel Big Fish. The band continued to push forward, spending the remainder of the year in the studio recording a follow-up album. By the end of the year, Fried reported that the sessions had been rather prolific, the latest session had produced seven new demos, bringing the overall tally of 19 new songs in contention for the second album. He also stated the band had been working with record producer Tony Berg on some of the demos, with the hopes of entering the studio with him in early 2004. The band proceeded to enter the studio in early 2004 with Eric Stenman, who produced, mixed, and engineered further demos with the band. While largely quiet during this period, the band reemerged in May 2004 by announcing they'd be playing live shows in May and June, but under a new, temporary moniker "Nigel", to represent the stylistic shift in their new music. The band performed the shows, but by mid-June it was abruptly announced that the band had broken up altogether due to their creative differences with one another. Einziger, Fried, and Steen formed a new band that same year called Agent Sparks, although Steen left to play in Reel Big Fish before recording any material with the band. Agent Sparks recorded two releases without any success, an EP, Not So Merry in 2005, and a full album, Red Rover in 2006, before disbanding themselves in 2007.

While the second album was ultimately aborted, some tracks from the sessions were eventually released in various ways. In August 2008, Audiovent released five previously unreleased demos on their Myspace account for streaming and purchase, under the title of The Lost Demos Vol. 1. No further volumes have been released, though Stenman later released another Audiovent demo on his personal website entitled "Call My Name".

In late 2018, the band announced their reformation, alongside a tour with Hoobastank. However, the tour was cancelled before it started by Hoobastank due to "an unforeseen personal matter". A reunion show was instead scheduled for January 11, 2019, at The Viper Room.

In October 2023 the band released a new song named 'Sleepless Machine'.

== Musical style and influences ==
The band purposely used a traditional "guitar, bass, and drum" rock sound in their music, in efforts to distance themselves from the DJs, rapped vocals, and angsty themes commonly found in nu metal and rap metal's music, which was at its peak of popularity upon the band's major label debut. The band desired to distance themselves from the shadow of their sibling's band Incubus, though critics commonly compared them regardless, especially to Incubus's 1999 album Make Yourself and Brandon Boyd's vocals. They did manage to avoid said band's nu metal label though, most commonly being identified as alternative rock, post-grunge, and hard rock. Music journalists noted a diversity between their songs as well, with Margo Whitman of Billboard described them as having "cuts that run the gamut from acoustic-type ballads to hardcore rock numbers". The band experimented with the sitar on the track "Rain", and a 22-piece orchestra in "When I Drown".

The band was greatly influenced by classic rock, such as The Beatles, Pink Floyd, and David Bowie. According to Boyd:

We look at old footage of Jimi Hendrix and Led Zeppelin and The Who, and that's really what gets us going. We want music to be like that again ... The stuff we listen to isn't what's going on today ... everything from Beatles to Zep to Hendrix—everything from that to old Stevie Wonder, James Brown, The Funky Meters—And I like bands that do something different, that aren't afraid to step it up a notch ... Radiohead, obviously, and The Flaming Lips, Shudder to Think-- We just play stuff that comes from our hearts. It's all natural.

Boyd states the band was also influenced by soul, funk, and jazz in a general sense, and metal in their earlier days. Boyd states that the band composed 9 minute Pink Floyd-esque progressive rock songs in their earlier days, but the band ended up unhappy with the end results, and strayed away from the approach upon becoming more familiar with the Beatles and Led Zeppelin. Wilcox stated that drumming of John Bonham, Ziggy Modeliste, and Russell Batiste Jr. were particularly influential to his drumming style.

== Members ==
Last lineup

- Jason Boyd - vocals (1993–2004, 2018–present)
- Benjamin Einziger - guitar, vocals (1993–2004, 2018–present)
- Paul Fried - bass (1993–2004, 2018–2019)
- Shane McLafferty - drums (2018–2019)

Past

- Greg Cooper - drums (1991–1994)
- Josh LeVine - guitar (1991–1994)
- Jamin Wilcox - drums, vocals (1993–2003)
- Ryland Steen - drums (2003–2004)

== Discography ==
Studio albums

Year	Album details	Peak chart positions	
Year	Album details	US	US Heat.
1999	Papa's Dojo: Released: 1999; Label: Independent; Format: CD	—	—
2002	Dirty Sexy Knights in Paris: Released: June 4, 2002; Label: Atlantic (83544); Format: CD, digital download	156	4

Singles

Year	Single	Peak chart positions			Album
Year	Single	US Alt.	US Main.	UK	Album
2002	"The Energy"	17	9	167	Dirty Sexy Knights in Paris
2002	"Looking Down"	—	29	—	Dirty Sexy Knights in Paris
2023	"Sleeping Machine"	—	—	—	—
2024	"Sonic Sunrise"	—	—	—	—
2025	"Dead End (Sexy Sad)	—	—	—	—
"—" denotes a release that did not chart.
