= Ben Kenney =

American musician

- Kenney performing with Incubus in 2012

Background information
- Born: March 12, 1977 (age 49)
- Origin: Brielle, New Jersey, U.S.
- Occupation: Musician
- Instruments: Bass guitar, guitar
- Years active: 1994–present
- Formerly of: Incubus, The Roots, Time Lapse Consortium
- Website: benkenney.com

Ben Kenney (born March 12, 1977) is an American guitarist and bassist from Brielle, New Jersey. He played guitar with the Roots in the early 2000s before joining Incubus as its bassist in 2003, replacing founding bassist Alex Katunich. He remained with Incubus for approximately two decades, appearing on the band's recordings from A Crow Left of the Murder... (2004) through Trust Fall (Side B) (2020). After an extended absence from touring while recovering from brain surgery, his departure from the group was announced in February 2024.

In addition to his work with the Roots and Incubus, Kenney has released a series of solo recordings through Ghetto Crush Industries and has worked as a session musician for artists including Jay-Z, Justin Timberlake, Blackalicious, Musiq Soulchild, DJ Jazzy Jeff and Bubba Sparxxx.

== Career ==
=== Early career and the Roots ===
Kenney began playing professionally in New Jersey in the 1990s. An artist biography published by Strandberg Guitars dates the beginning of his work with the New Jersey band Racecar to 1994. He subsequently recorded with the group Supergrub. The band's releases included Norma & Thurselle (1996), Communicator (1997) and Challenger (2000).

Kenney joined the Roots as a guitarist around 2000. During this period, the Roots served as the backing band for Jay-Z's 2001 Unplugged performance and album. Kenney is credited with acoustic guitar on the recording.

In the summer of 2001, both the Roots and Incubus were among the acts booked for Moby's touring Area:One festival. Kenney later recalled that he met the members of Incubus while he was playing with the Roots and remained in contact with them afterward.

Kenney contributed guitar to the Roots' 2002 album Phrenology. A contemporary review in Salon specifically noted his guitar work on the song "The Seed (2.0)".

Kenney also accumulated session credits during this period. His recording credits include electric bass on Musiq Soulchild's Aijuswanaseing and bass on Blackalicious's Blazing Arrow, as well as guitar on Justin Timberlake's Justified, Vivian Green's A Love Story, DJ Jazzy Jeff's The Magnificent, and Bubba Sparxxx's Deliverance. He also performed guitar and bass on recordings by producer and cellist Larry Gold and worked as a producer and multi-instrumentalist with the Jazzyfatnastees.

=== Incubus ===
Following the touring cycle for Phrenology, Incubus guitarist Mike Einziger and drummer Jose Pasillas asked Kenney to play bass in their instrumental side project Time Lapse Consortium. The group performed at the Roxy Theatre in Hollywood on January 24, 2003. A recording of the performance was released that year as Live at the Roxy Theatre; its personnel also included keyboardist Neal Evans and an ensemble of horn, string and percussion players.

In April 2003, Incubus announced that founding bassist Alex Katunich, also known as Dirk Lance, had left the group. Rolling Stone reported on April 4 that Kenney, identifying him as a musician who had played guitar with the Roots, would replace Katunich. A second Rolling Stone report the following week stated that Kenney would perform with Incubus on the 2003 Lollapalooza tour and participate in the band's recording sessions.

Kenney's first studio album as a member of Incubus was A Crow Left of the Murder..., released in 2004. He subsequently appeared on Light Grenades (2006), If Not Now, When? (2011), the EP Trust Fall (Side A) (2015), 8 (2017), and the EP Trust Fall (Side B) (2020). In addition to bass, Kenney received vocal and composition credits on the band's releases, including Light Grenades, 8, Trust Fall (Side A) and the compilation Monuments and Melodies.

His bass parts also incorporated different instruments and recording approaches. On the 2006 single "Anna Molly", for example, Kenney recorded most of the bass part on a Lakland Joe Osborn model with flatwound strings and used a Lakland Bob Glaub model with roundwound strings for a chordal section in the bridge.

=== Solo work ===
Kenney began releasing solo albums while a member of Incubus. His first album, 26, was released in 2004, followed by Maduro in 2006 and Distance and Comfort in 2008. His recordings were released through Ghetto Crush Industries, an independent label operated by Kenney and his associates. In a 2008 interview, Kenney described the label as a small, voluntarily run operation, while the Santa Barbara Independent described him as handling the writing, production, vocals and instrumentation on his solo projects.

He followed Distance and Comfort with Burn the Tapes (2010), the EP Leave On Your Makeup (2013), and Must Be Nice (2019). Leave On Your Makeup included guest vocals from Incubus singer Brandon Boyd and guitarist Kaki King on "I'll Be Outside".

Following an extended break from recording and performing during his recovery from brain surgery, Kenney released Powerful Buttcheeks on March 3, 2025. He wrote, performed, recorded, mixed and produced the album, playing its bass, guitar, drums, percussion, keyboards and vocals. In April 2025, he returned to live performance at the Moroccan Lounge in Los Angeles with bassist Ashley Mendel and drummer Mark Whitfield Jr.

=== Health and departure from Incubus ===
Kenney began experiencing symptoms including problems with balance and hearing in 2019 and 2020. During an Incubus tour in the summer of 2021, he was diagnosed with an acoustic neuroma. According to Kenney, the tumor had damaged the auditory nerve in his right ear and was placing pressure on a facial nerve.

Kenney completed the tour and underwent surgery in November 2021. The procedure left him with permanent hearing loss in his right ear and facial paralysis during his recovery. He did not publicly discuss the surgery until January 2023, when he announced that he would take time away from touring and social media. Tal Wilkenfeld temporarily performed with Incubus in his place. Nicole Row later took over the touring position for most of 2023.

In February 2024, Incubus announced that Kenney had decided to leave the band and that Row would become its permanent bassist. The band's announcement described Kenney as its bassist for more than 20 years and stated that Row had originally been suggested as a substitute by Kenney. In a 2025 interview with Bass Magazine, Kenney said that during his recovery he had decided that he did not want to return to the previous cycle of Incubus touring and instead wanted to pursue other musical work.

== Equipment ==
Kenney performing with Incubus in 2012

Kenney has used Lakland basses extensively. A 2012 Premier Guitar rig profile documented several custom Lakland instruments in his touring setup, including a 34-inch-scale bass with a one-piece mahogany body and JBE pickups, a 35-inch-scale bass, a five-string model with roundwound strings, and a 30-inch-scale J-style instrument with flatwound strings. His touring amplification at the time consisted of Mesa Boogie WalkAbout amplifiers and extension cabinets. His effects included an Ernie Ball volume pedal, Fulltone Bass-Drive, Boss OC-2 octave and TU-3 tuner, Ibanez CS-9 chorus, and either an Emma or Aguilar compressor.

For the recording of "Anna Molly", Kenney split his bass signal through a D.W. Fearn direct box and a Mesa Walkabout Scout amplifier.

A 2025 Bass Magazine feature listed three principal basses in his then-current equipment: a 2003 Lakland Skyline Joe Osborn with JBE pickups and GHS Boomers strings, a 2012 Lakland USA Custom 55-94 with Lakland pickups and GHS Boomers, and a 2018 Serek Sacramento Custom fitted with a JBE pickup and Thomastik-Infeld strings. His effects included Ibanez Tube Screamer and CS9 pedals, a Way Huge Conquistador fuzz and an Aguilar Tone Hammer, and he used Dunlop picks. His studio equipment has included Vintech and Grace Design preamps and amplifiers by Ampeg, Friedman and Mesa/Boogie.

Kenney has also used Strandberg instruments and has been included on the company's artist roster. As a multi-instrumentalist on his solo recordings, he has also used keyboards and synthesizers in addition to bass, guitar and drums.

== Personal life ==
Kenney married Georgia Dolenz, daughter of Micky Dolenz of the Monkees, in July 2025. Kenney discussed Dolenz's role in his recovery in a 2025 interview with Bass Magazine.

== Discography ==
=== With Supergrub ===
- Norma & Thurselle (1996)
- Communicator (1997)
- Challenger (2000)

=== With the Roots ===
- Phrenology (2002)

=== With Time Lapse Consortium ===
- Live at the Roxy Theatre (2003)

=== With The Division Group ===
- The Division Group (2003)

=== With Incubus ===
- A Crow Left of the Murder... (2004)
- Light Grenades (2006)
- If Not Now, When? (2011)
- Trust Fall (Side A) (EP, 2015)
- 8 (2017)
- Trust Fall (Side B) (EP, 2020)

=== Solo ===
- 26 (2004)
- Maduro (2006)
- Distance and Comfort (2008)
- Burn the Tapes (2010)
- Leave On Your Makeup (EP, 2013)
- Must Be Nice (2019)
- Powerful Buttcheeks (2025)

=== Selected session and guest appearances ===
- Musiq Soulchild – Aijuswanaseing (2000) – bass
- Jay-Z – Unplugged (2001) – acoustic guitar
- Blackalicious – Blazing Arrow (2002) – bass
- Justin Timberlake – Justified (2002) – guitar
- Vivian Green – A Love Story (2002) – guitar
- DJ Jazzy Jeff – The Magnificent (2002) – guitar
- Jazzyfatnastees – The Tortoise & the Hare (2002) – producer, guitar and bass
- Bubba Sparxxx – Deliverance (2003) – guitar
- Larry Gold – Presents Don Cello and Friends (2003) – guitar and bass
- Coconut Records – Nighttiming (2007) – bass
