= Mike Einziger =

American guitarist (born 1976)

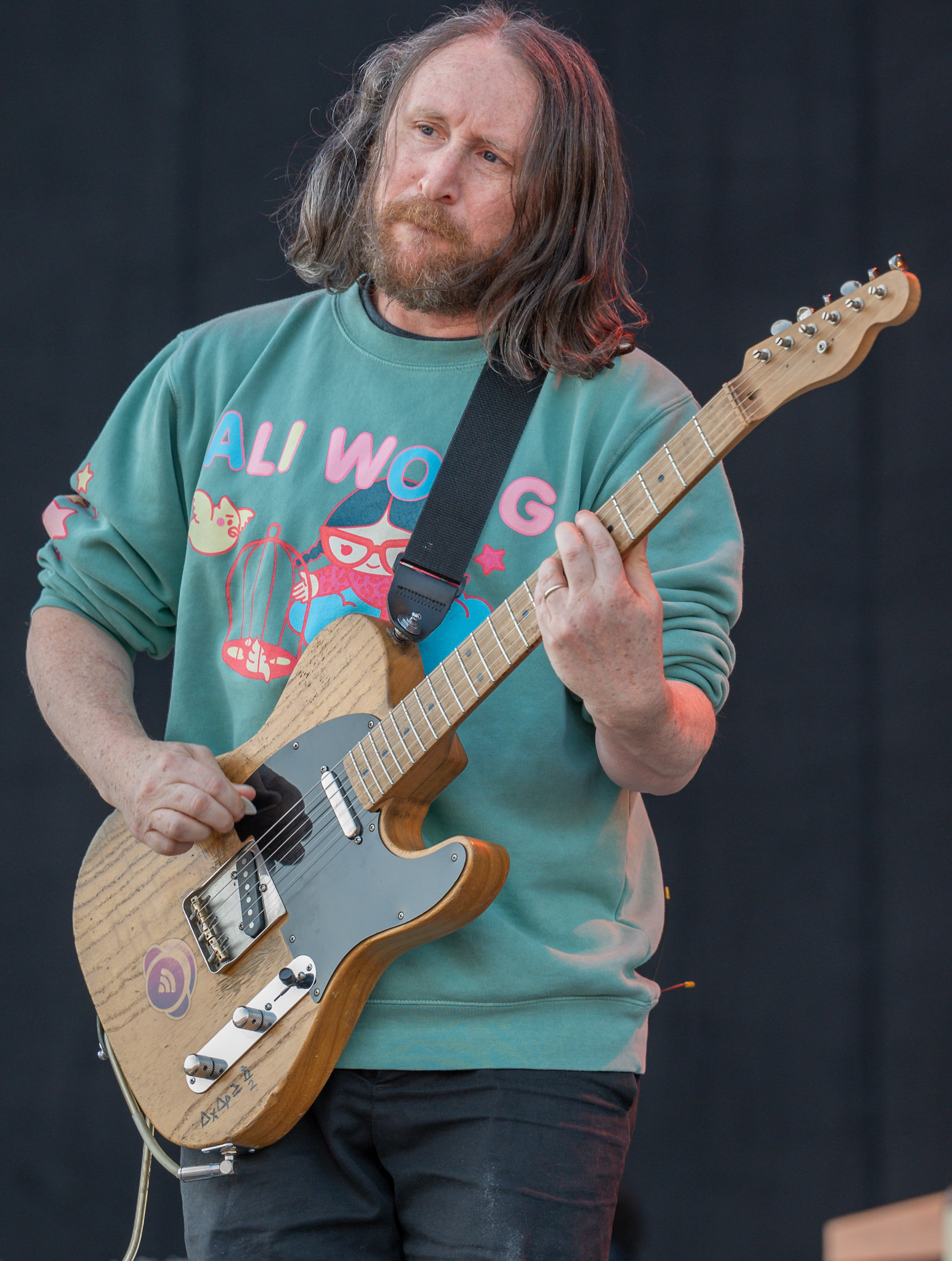
- Einziger at Rock im Park 2023

Background information
- Born: Michael Aaron Einziger; June 21, 1976 (age 50); Los Angeles, California, U.S.
- Genres: Alternative rock; alternative metal; nu metal
- Occupations: Musician; songwriter; record producer
- Instrument: Guitar
- Years active: 1991–present
- Member of: Incubus

Michael Aaron Einziger (born June 21, 1976) is an American musician, songwriter and producer. He is the guitarist and a founding member of the rock band Incubus, and has also co-written, produced and collaborated with a wide array of artists including Pharrell Williams, Hans Zimmer, Skrillex, Tyler the Creator, Avicii, Damian Marley, Jason Schwartzman (Coconut Records) and Steve Martin among many others. Incubus has sold over 23 Million albums worldwide, and in 2013, Einziger co-wrote the hit song "Wake Me Up", alongside Avicii and Aloe Blacc. As an entrepreneur, Einziger is the co-founder and co-chairman of the wireless technology platform MIXhalo, and also the co-founder and CEO of the biotechnology startup Versicolor Technologies. Einziger received his education at Harvard University.

== Career ==
=== Incubus ===
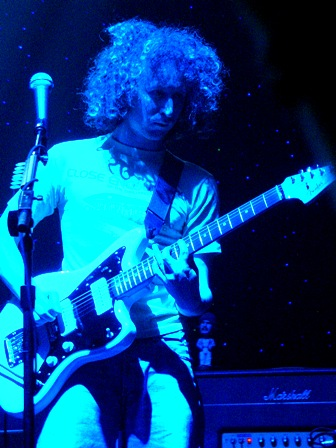
Einziger performing with Incubus in 2004

Einziger co-founded Incubus with Calabasas High School classmates Brandon Boyd, Jose Pasillas II, and Alex Katunich in 1991. Incubus has sold over 23 million albums worldwide and has been nominated for two Grammys, MTV music video awards, American Music Awards, MTV U Woodie Award, and the Billboard Awards. Incubus has performed sold-out concerts at The Hollywood Bowl, The Great Western Forum, Madison Square Garden, Radio City Music Hall, Wembley Arena in London, and Araneta Coliseum in Manila, Philippines.

=== Solo work and current projects ===
Outside of his work with Incubus, Einziger founded his own project Time Lapse Consortium in 2003. The group featured Incubus musicians Jose Pasillas II and Ben Kenney (who was not a member of Incubus at the time), Neal Evans of the band Soulive, and long-time collaborator Suzie Katayama contributing string arrangements. The band had their debut show at The Roxy in LA, and would go on to play Jimmy Kimmel and the Knitting Factory in New York City.

Einziger's career as a film score composer began in the early 2000s, first with the short film Miss Gentilbelle, and then the independent comedy film Sol Goode, which also featured Jared Leto of the band Thirty Seconds to Mars. He has sporadically continued to compose background music for films.

In 2003 Einziger contributed to Ziggy Marley's debut solo album Dragonfly alongside fellow Incubus member Chris Kilmore as well as Flea and John Frusciante of Red Hot Chili Peppers. Einziger also expanded into the realm of video games when he and his bandmates worked on the soundtrack of the popular game Halo 2, writing a 26-minute song that also featured Flea on trumpet. In 2006 Einziger produced the debut album "Red Rover" by Agent Sparks; a collaboration with younger brothers Benjamin Einziger and Paul Fried.

In 2007, Einziger produced Nighttiming, the debut album of long-time friend and former Phantom Planet drummer and actor Jason Schwartzman's Coconut Records project. The album featured appearances by Kirsten Dunst, Zooey Deschanel, and Robert Schwartzman, and was recorded at Einziger's own home studio in Malibu, CA (Casa Chica).

==== End.>vacuum ====
Einziger began crafting an orchestral composition "End.>vacuum" following surgery in March 2007 for carpal tunnel syndrome, a repetitive-strain injury to his left wrist. The condition forced him to take a hiatus from the band and his instrument.

The piece consisted of nine musical movements (approximately 40 minutes total) and was performed by a chamber orchestra led by renowned Los Angeles conductor and Einziger's longtime collaborator Suzie Katayama. Inspiration has been attributed to such iconoclastic modern and avant-garde composers as Igor Stravinsky, George Antheil, George Crumb, Samuel Barber, Krzysztof Penderecki and Frank Zappa.

According to Einziger, "End.>vacuum" makes reference to his perception of the outer edge of human understanding, "the finite place where rational scientific knowledge stops and pure speculation ensues…The event horizon between what we know and what we don't know is what keeps me awake at night, but also gets me out of bed every day."

"Einziger's work plays with time." Los Angeles Times' Steve Hochman proclaimed, "Pulsating tribal/mechanical rhythms melt into sustained, almost static stretches before the rhythm reemerges. The early-'80s large ensemble work of John Adams comes to mind, but the character of the piece is Einziger's own."

End.>vacuum was Einziger's first original orchestral composition. It debuted at UCLA's famed Royce Hall on August 23, 2008.

==== Harvard and studies ====
Einziger has studied the history and philosophy of physics with physicist/historian, Dr. Peter Galison, of Harvard University.

He has a profound interest in the physical sciences. In 2008 he contributed to an article on the topic of human evolution with evolutionary biology figure and Brown University professor Dr. Kenneth Miller.

On June 17, 2008, Einziger took a personal tour of the Large Hadron Collider at CERN in Geneva, Switzerland with British physicist Dr. Brian Cox. During that visit, Einziger invited Dr. Cox to appear as a speaker at his concert for later that Fall.

==== Other works ====
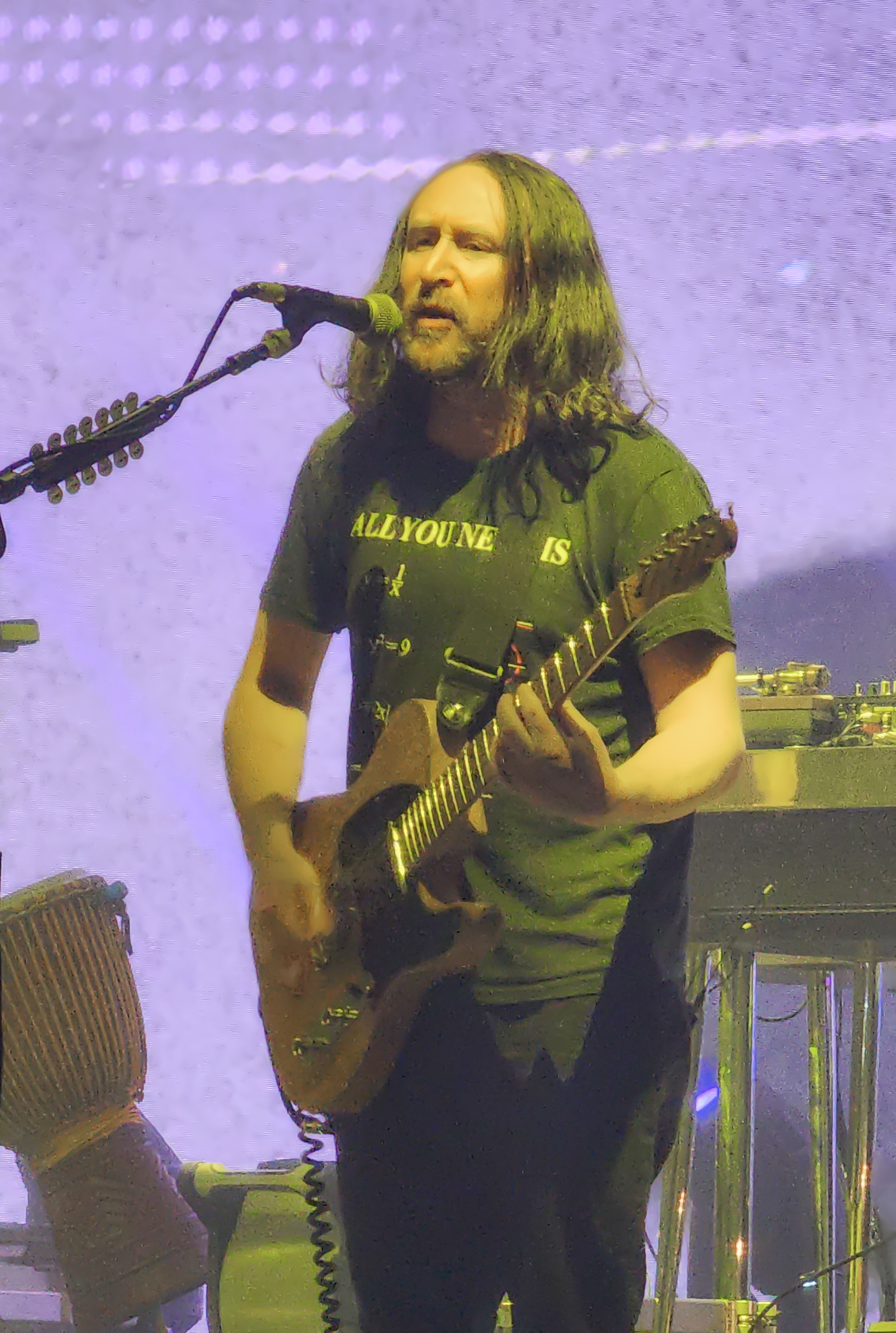
Einziger performing in 2023

In 2009, Einziger orchestrated and recorded the additional strings for the Thirty Seconds to Mars third album This Is War.

In 2012 Einziger began working with progressive house artist Avicii on the EDM producer's song "Wake Me Up!" for his debut studio album True. Einziger helped premiere the song live at Ultra 15 along with bandmates Jose Pasillas, Ben Kenney and country music legend Mac Davis. As of July 2013, the song reached No. 1 on the charts in 39 countries.

Einziger also worked on music for The Amazing Spider-Man 2 with Hans Zimmer, Pharrell Williams, Johnny Marr and David A. Stewart.

== Musical influences ==
Mike has cited his early guitar influences as Jimmy Page, Jimi Hendrix, John Frusciante, Steve Vai, Paul Fried and Frank Zappa. He claims "infatuation" with Björk's voice. Mike was also heavily influenced by the music of Black Sabbath and Metallica. Mike said that some of the music he was most proud of was the music he had worked on with Avicii.

== Personal life ==
Einziger was born in Los Angeles. He is of Jewish descent.

Beginning in 2008, Mike was enrolled as a special student studying music theory at Harvard University.

In August 2017, Mike welcomed his first children, twin girls, with wife Ann-Marie Calhoun.

== Equipment ==
Early on, Einziger played Ibanez guitars, and sometime around the making of Enjoy Incubus (1997) he switched to Paul Reed Smith (PRS) (Custom 24's). On the albums Science and Make Yourself he used a Mesa Boogie Tremoverb. While recording songs on Make Yourself (1999), for example the track "Make Yourself", Einziger used PRS McCarty Archtop guitars. On the Morning View (2001) album, he only used his PRS McCarty Archtops. During the A Crow Left of the Murder... tour, he started playing Fender Jazzmaster guitars. This guitar is played most prominently on the Alive at Red Rocks DVD. On the Light Grenades tour, Einziger was seen using a Gibson SG Junior with P-90's modified with an extra neck pickup and a pickup selector switch. In 2012, he switched to Music Man Albert Lee signature guitars and began running lighter strings (down to 9s after running 13s for many years) because of his need to find a more "comfortable" guitar for touring. Einziger has stated this was necessary since developing and having surgery for carpal tunnel syndrome. He currently uses Fender Telecaster guitars.

Einziger is a multi-instrumentalist and, in addition to guitar, has played piano, Mellotron, pipa, analog synthesizers, Fender Rhodes, Wurlitzer, and many other instruments on his recordings with Incubus as well as his other projects. He has also played a Jerry Jones Guitars Master Sitar on "Nowhere Fast" from Make Yourself (for live performances he plays the sitar part with his guitar), and a pipa on "Aqueous Transmission". Einziger also plays electric piano on songs like "Here In My Room", and has played piano on live versions of "Drive".

He commonly uses Mesa/Boogie Trem-O-Verb 2/12 Combos and Marshall Plexi amplifiers. He uses Electro-Harmonix Micro POG (Polyphonic Octave Generator) for the solo section on "Promises, Promises." On the title track, "If Not Now, When?" Einziger plays a Mellotron mandolin. He has a 1930s Gibson with a smaller body and used an older Martin acoustic when recording "Defiance". In the video for "Adolescents", he is seen with a custom PRS guitar which was sold at a charity auction for $15,000 and was borrowed from the buyer for the video shoot.

He stopped using PRS guitars after some issues arose with an employee of Paul Reed Smith.

A detailed gear diagram of Einziger's 2000 Incubus guitar rig is well-documented.
