= S.C.I.E.N.C.E. =

Studio album by Incubus
- Released: September 9, 1997
- Studio: 4th Street Recording (Santa Monica, California)
- Genres: Nu metal; alternative metal; funk metal; rap metal
- Length: 55:51
- Labels: Epic; Immortal
- Producer: Jim Wirt

Incubus chronology
| Enjoy Incubus (1997) | S.C.I.E.N.C.E. (1997) | Make Yourself (1999) |

Singles from S.C.I.E.N.C.E.
- 1. "A Certain Shade of Green" Released: September 9, 1997; 2. "Redefine" Released: 1997; 3. "New Skin" Released: September 22, 1998

S.C.I.E.N.C.E. is the second studio album by American rock band Incubus. It was released on September 9, 1997, by Epic and Immortal Records. This album marked a stylistic departure from the band's early material, featuring heavy guitar riffs, slap bass and turntables to create their most nu metal album. The album was certified gold by the RIAA, and is the second and final release to feature Gavin Koppel (known as DJ Lyfe), who first appeared on the 1997 Enjoy Incubus EP. It has been occasionally considered the band's proper debut album, due to the nature of their independent release Fungus Amongus.

== Background and recording ==
After recording their independent debut album Fungus Amongus (1995), Incubus signed a seven-record deal with Epic/Sony-affiliated Immortal Records in 1996. An EP titled Enjoy Incubus was released by Epic/Immortal at the beginning of 1997, and Incubus would go on a European tour with labelmates Korn and The Urge for the next few months. With Enjoy Incubus, the label's strategy was to build the band's fanbase through touring rather than radio airplay. One of the first things the band had done after getting signed was buying new instruments, which would be used on future recordings. Drummer José Pasillas said that the band's old instruments were "falling apart". Guitarist Mike Einziger had previously been using an Ibanez RG570, and spent his money from the record company to purchase a Paul Reed Smith guitar. The four founding band members were in their early 20s at this point, and dropped out of school once getting signed, with Pasillas recalling "before then, each one of us were enrolled in schools because there was part of us that wanted to appease our parents. Getting signed was our okay to drop out of school." DJ Lyfe was older than the other four members and originally joined Incubus in late 1995, following the release of Fungus Amongus. Lyfe had first met Incubus at a live show in Hollywood, where he approached them about incorporating his music into the band, claiming that it might add an interesting dimension to their sound.

According to singer Brandon Boyd, "S.C.I.E.N.C.E. was done in six weeks at 4th Street Recording, a very small, charming studio in Santa Monica. Very different experience, but very important on this band's existence." While the single "New Skin" originated a few years prior, Pasillas claimed in 2002 that for other songs they had two months to write the music. He added, "it was cool for us, because we had a lot of ideas and it was a pretty compressed amount of time. The circumstances weren't ideal — we were working in a dingy little rehearsal room — but at that time we didn't care. We were playing music for a living." According to Pasillas, they wrote 14 songs for S.C.I.E.N.C.E. in total.

Unlike with later Incubus albums, the songs were recorded to tape, and the band wanted to avoid creating music that they wouldn't be able to perform live. During the recording, the band utilized older analogue gear that they described as having "phat sounds and spider webs." Incubus chose Jim Wirt to produce the album, since he had worked with them on earlier recordings. Einziger believed that Wirt helped encourage their creativity during the recording of S.C.I.E.N.C.E., saying in 1997, "he helps us come up with strange stuff and he likes it when we do. He doesn't try to change what we do, he tries to enhance it." Einziger added in the same interview, "when we signed our record deal and started working on this album, we were worried that someone would come along and tell us to hold back, and try and make our songs a little more palatable. But that never happened. They kinda just said, 'do whatever you want'. With that kind of support, we just let everything kind of run wild." Pasillas similarly noted the lack of outside influence in 2017, saying "we didn’t have label people coming in hovering above us making sure we weren't wasting money. We were left to our own devices and we worked well that way." In a 2018 interview with Australian magazine HEAVY, Boyd remembered "when we wrote S.C.I.E.N.C.E. we didn't know about any songwriting rules. It was like a chopped salad, schizophrenic album put together and we did it because we just didn’t know any better. We were just having a good time." He also believes that Incubus still hadn't found a distinct voice of their own yet, saying in 2022 that they sounded like the offspring from a "crazy orgy" between Faith No More, Mr. Bungle, Red Hot Chili Peppers, Björk and other artists. Einziger told Guitar World in 2011 that the band developed more of their own sound on later albums since they had experienced more of the world through touring by then, and that on S.C.I.E.N.C.E. "[we sounded] like what we had been listening to."

For the liner notes, every member except DJ Lyfe and bassist Alex Katunich used a pseudonym made specifically for the album, with Boyd's being "Cornelius", Einziger's being "Jawa" and Pasillas's being "Badmammajamma". The concept of using pseudonyms was carried over from Fungus Amongus and Enjoy Incubus, where the members had been using several different ones created specifically for those releases, including the pseudonyms "Happy Knappy" and "Brandon of the Jungle" (used by Boyd), and the pseudonyms "Fabio" and "Dynamike" (used by Einziger). Katunich used the pseudonym "Dirk Lance" for all three of these releases, while DJ Lyfe used the pseudonym "Kid Lyfe" for Enjoy Incubus, before deciding to use his regular stage name for S.C.I.E.N.C.E..

Mastering work was done at Larrabee West Studios in Hollywood, California. When S.C.I.E.N.C.E. was in the process of being recorded and mastered, the band went on some local mini-tours, in addition to appearing on the soundtrack for the movie Spawn. The soundtrack was released on July 29, 1997, by Epic/Immortal, and featured a collaboration with DJ Greyboy called "Familiar". This song also briefly appeared in the movie itself, which was released to theaters on August 1, 1997. It samples the 1960 song "Theme for Doris", by jazz musician Tina Brooks. Boyd claimed in a 1997 Kerrang! interview that he had seen the Spawn movie, and described it as "a really shitty movie" with "a great soundtrack". That year, the song "Glass" was also featured on a 7-inch vinyl single with the song "Water & Solutions", by Epic/Immortal labelmates Far. "Water & Solutions" was taken from the album of the same name, which was recorded around the same time as S.C.I.E.N.C.E., but not released until March 1998. Incubus later toured with Far, and on promotional photos for 2001's Morning View, Einziger can be seen wearing a hoodie with the cover of their 1997 EP Soon.

== Musical style and influences ==
Musically, S.C.I.E.N.C.E. has been described as nu metal, alternative metal, funk metal, and rap metal. The album incorporates elements of multiple genres, including jazz, heavy metal, funk, hip-hop, techno, and electro. It was labelled as "schizo funk/jazz/metal" by Spin in 2001. In September 1997, Hits magazine called the album's lighter songs "loungey" and "almost reminiscent of Jamiroquai". "Magic Medicine", described as a trip hop track, samples a recorded reading of a children's book. Paul Elliot of Kerrang! wrote in May 1998 that "at their lightest — on 'Summer Romance (Anti-Gravity Love Song)' for example — Incubus are deliciously, irresistibly funky. And at their heaviest — notably on the frantic 'Favorite Things' — they're reminiscent of Faith No More at their wildest." Elliot added that people who were upset about the split of Faith No More "[should go along] to an Incubus gig." The Daily Nebraskan referred to them as a "funk-heavy foursome" in 1998, while Billboard labelled them a funk rock band in December 1997. According to Rolling Stone writer Rob Kemp, S.C.I.E.N.C.E. "links funk metal to the rap-metal". Though sometimes retrospectively associated with it, the term nu metal was not yet in usage when S.C.I.E.N.C.E. was released, but rather terms such as alternative metal, funk metal and rap metal. In 1997, Boyd said "people are real quick to put labels on music, so I'm sure they're going to do that with us. But we think we're doing something cool, and judging from the responses that we've gotten from all over the world, others do too." Einziger has since stated that Incubus were not part of the same Southern Californian scene as bands like Korn and System of a Down during their independent years, despite having similar influences. In interviews from the late 2010s and 2020s, Boyd has said that he dislikes the nu metal label and doesn't consider the band's early work to be part of the movement. In a 2022 Metal Hammer interview, he remarked, "we weren’t trying to fit into a particular niche at a particular time. We were just kids being influenced by a small handful of bands that we grew up with."

Revolver describe Brandon Boyd as vocally "drawing on the eccentric funk-rap" of Faith No More, Primus and Red Hot Chili Peppers. They consider him to have a "goofy yet also badass presence" on S.C.I.E.N.C.E. Boyd has cited Faith No More's vocalist Mike Patton as being an influence from since he was an early teenager, as well as Patton's side project Mr. Bungle, who were similarly known for mixing a wide array of genres. Through Mr. Bungle, Boyd also went on to become a fan of avant-garde musician John Zorn, who produced their 1991 debut album. In a 2003 interview with the Philippine Daily Inquirer, Boyd said that around this period, both he and Einziger gravitated towards more experimental artists that "you'll never hear on the radio". Alex Katunich uses a slap bass playing style on the album, and has said he was influenced by funk music since he was a young child, and got an album of Disney songs done in disco style. When he became a teenager, he said Faith No More's 1989 album The Real Thing began influencing him, in addition to becoming influenced by Mr. Bungle and other funk metal bands, such as Infectious Grooves, Primus and Red Hot Chili Peppers. In a 1998 interview, Boyd was asked about whether Incubus was influenced by Faith No More, who had broken up in April of that year, and he commented, "there's a definite influence from Faith No More. All of us have been listening to that band since when we were really young. We were like 14 or something when that album [The Real Thing] came out. They were an awesome band, they did some really groundbreaking things in their time, and it's kind of a bummer to hear that they broke up." Boyd also noted in October 1997 that they were frequently compared to both Faith No More and the Red Hot Chili Peppers, saying "when people do try and compare us, it's usually with those two bands."

"Calgone" (1997)
30 second sample of the S.C.I.E.N.C.E. track "Calgone".

In addition to these influences, the band became interested in emerging electronic genres like drum and bass around the making of S.C.I.E.N.C.E., with their previous full-length album Fungus Amongus having no influence from electronic genres. While playing at European festivals with Korn and The Urge during early 1997, they recall being exposed to foreign electronic acts such as The Chemical Brothers. During the subsequent S.C.I.E.N.C.E. tour, the band sometimes created improvisational pieces of drum and bass music in between their songs, and this was how the song "Nowhere Fast" originated, with it being recorded for their next album Make Yourself (1999). S.C.I.E.N.C.E. was also the band's first release to be written with turntables, since several of the songs on Enjoy Incubus were re-recordings of tracks from Fungus Amongus. In a 2000 interview, Boyd remembered that when Incubus first met DJ Lyfe and he suggested adding his instrument, they were intrigued by this idea. They decided to incorporate the instrument after only a single rehearsal with Lyfe, with Boyd recalling that "it just began to present itself as probably a very cool new instrument that could offer lots and lots of opportunities sonically." AllMusic describe the use of turntables as being the main hip-hop element on the album, which primarily features melodic, sung vocals rather than rapping or other vocal styles such as screaming. The album utilizes other instruments also not traditionally associated with rock music, including the saxophone and the digeridoo and djembe (which originate from Australia and West Africa). Boyd can be heard playing the digeridoo at the beginning of the opening track "Redefine", and he would bring one with him on the tour for S.C.I.E.N.C.E..

== Songs ==
About the opening track "Redefine", Boyd said in 1997 that it was about creating one's own reality and world. The metaphor was humans as Magic Markers; they painted black and white their whole lives because that was all they knew, but they could use different colors and make beautiful art if they took control. On the single "New Skin", he compares a scab to the present state of society. To him, a scab looks bad, but it reveals a stronger piece of skin when it breaks away, which he compared to "creation out of chaos." "Favorite Things", according to Boyd, is about his belief that religion oppresses what he enjoys most. Simple things such as "thinking for myself, creating my own reality and being whatever the hell I want to be each day of my life, are a sin," and Christians have to give up control over their lives.

"Favorite Things" also includes a sample of the 1959 track "Flamenco Fantasy", by easy listening group the 101 Strings Orchestra. The song has a similar title to "My Favorite Things", from the musical The Sound of Music, with both songs repeatedly mentioning their titles in the lyrics. However, it does not musically reference "My Favorite Things". The single "A Certain Shade of Green" has been described as being a song about procrastination. The line "Are you gonna stand around till 2012 A.D.?" is a reference to an interpretation of the Mayan calendar which dictated that the world would end on December 21, 2012. Boyd did not believe this to be true, but it was on his mind as his mother was researching it for a book called Maya Memory: The Glory That Was Palenque.

While recording "Nebula", Boyd said in 1997, "we found out what it's like to actually plug a phaser pedal into the wall while it's on. It sounds like a laser gun, and that's the first sound you hear in 'Nebula'." He added that for the song, "we used these walkie-talkies for children that have this Slinky-like coil between them. When you talk through them and hit the coil, it makes this natural reverb, like talking in another dimension."

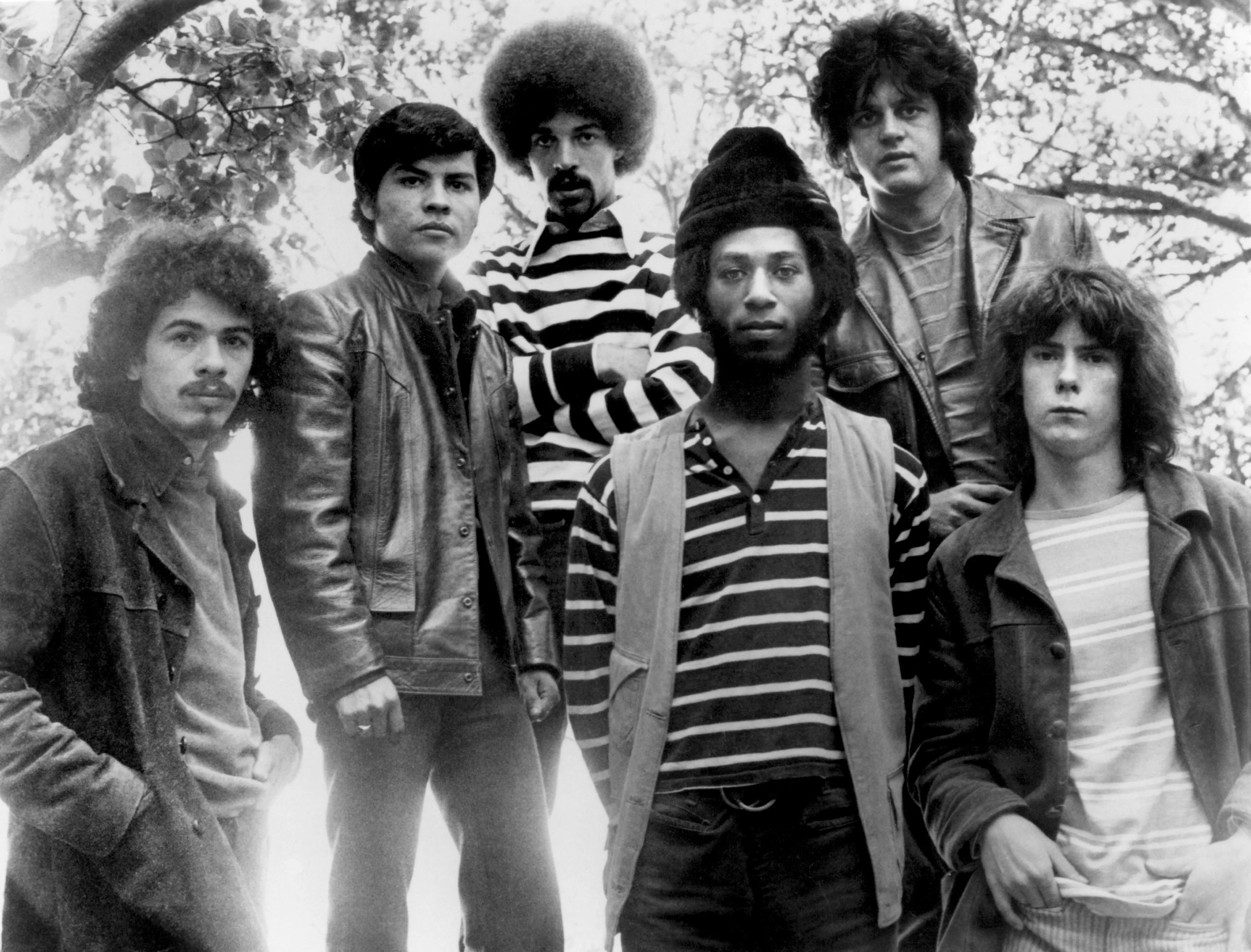
Rolling Stone compared "Summer Romance" to the music of Santana

"Summer Romance (Anti-Gravity Love Song)" was the first love ballad the band wrote, but was written in a less serious manner than later songs touching on similar subjects, such as "Stellar". It featured saxophonist Jeremy Wasser of Hoobastank, a band which grew up in the same neighborhood of Southern California. The members of Hoobastank had known Incubus since 1993, and through them were introduced to Jim Wirt in 1996, with Wirt going on to produce several Hoobastank recordings. At that time, Hoobastank were unsigned and also playing a funk metal-style of music inspired by bands like Faith No More and Mr. Bungle. By the time Hoobastank signed to Island Records in 2000, they got rid of Wasser and had changed their sound to a more straightforward rock style. The penultimate track "Deep Inside" is another of the lighter songs on the album, drawing heavily from funk music. However, it also has a short heavy metal section beginning roughly 3 minutes into the song. The lyrics reference being high on drugs at 3 A.M., and as the song goes on the time progresses to 4 A.M. and eventually 5 A.M. "Deep Inside" stopped being performed live when Alex Katunich left Incubus at the beginning of April 2003, with the last known performance coming during December 2001.

The closing track "Calgone" lyrically revolves around an alien abduction. It ends with a sound clip of the band arguing with DJ Lyfe (who is referred to by his real name of Gavin), for supposedly deleting a track they had been working on in the studio. On physical versions of the album, "Calgone" is followed by a hidden track called "Segue 1", which plays after 30 seconds of silence. The hidden track is also known as "Jose Loves Kate Moss, Part 1", and has been treated as a separate track on streaming sites such as Spotify. It begins with a sound recording at a morgue, and the pathologist is describing injuries a patient had sustained during a car crash on May 12, 1997. The hidden track goes on to feature several different sound samples and funk/electronic musical pieces. It samples sounds from the 1985 Sorcerer pinball machine and the song "Show Me Your Titz", from Hoobastank's 1997 demo Muffins. It also has an electronic piece in the style of Mozart's Toy Symphony, a sound sample of an unknown woman saying "is this the shit, or what?", and a short skit parodying The Karate Kid.

== Title and artwork ==
In 1997, Einziger claimed that the title reflected the experimental nature of the album, and the creative freedom the band were given. He was quoted as saying, "our album is called S.C.I.E.N.C.E. because we were able to experiment. We were able to take our time and get everything to sound the way we wanted it to — weird science and energetic funk." It has also been mentioned by various band members that the acronym S.C.I.E.N.C.E. stands for Sailing Catamarans Is Every Nautical Captain's Ecstasy. "Sometimes, we just sit around and come up with these for laughs. In other words, there's not just one meaning, it's just food for thought," said Boyd in 1998. In other early interviews, band members claimed that the title stood for Stupid Cops Invade Everyone's Natural Chaotic Energy, Sounds Cool in Eyes Near Communistic Entities and Surreal Cats in Economics Never Communicate Estacticly.

The cover art features a photo of the head of Boyd's father, who had earlier appeared on the cover of Enjoy Incubus. The source of the photos were unknown at the time, and the man on the cover of these releases came to be known as 'Chuck'. The cover is also the first to include the band's current logo, which has been used on every subsequent studio album (with the exception of A Crow Left of the Murder... and Light Grenades).

== Touring and promotion ==
Shortly before the release of S.C.I.E.N.C.E., Incubus played a handful of shows with rap rock bands Phunk Junkeez and Shootyz Groove. To support the album, Incubus went on tour with 311 and Sugar Ray between October 1997 and December 1997. At that time, Sugar Ray were experiencing huge success with their single "Fly", which had been released in mid-1997, and while the tour was happening their album Floored was certified platinum for sales of over a million copies. Incubus was the least known act on this tour, and were initially only meant to perform on the first leg of it. However, the crowd response to them was so great that they were asked to stay for the rest of the tour. During late 1997, the album's first two singles "A Certain Shade of Green" and "Redefine" were released to radio. That year, a music video for "A Certain Shade of Green" was also made.

In February 1998, DJ Lyfe was fired by the band, and was replaced by DJ Chris Kilmore. The reasoning given for his firing was because of creative and personal differences, and because Incubus could no longer be a "productive family" with him in it. Prior to finding Kilmore, the band were in a state of limbo for a week, since they were unsure whether to add another fifth member or not. Kilmore was originally from Harrisburg, Pennsylvania, and had moved to Los Angeles, where he was struggling to support himself. He recalled sometimes not having enough money for electricity, telling Spin in 2001 that "It was cool, I just used candles at night." Kilmore was recommended by a friend of the band, and received a phone call on Friday February 13, 1998, where he was asked to audition. The audition took place the next day at the Sound Arena Studios in Reseda, Los Angeles. Kilmore remembered in 2019 that, "we sat around for 45 minutes just talking", adding "little did I know they were really just trying to get an idea of my personality. So we were talking everything from girls to aliens — all kinds of crazy stuff." During the last 15 minutes of the audition, Alex Katunich asked Kilmore to showcase his turntable skills. The other members of Incubus were impressed with Kilmore's playing and attitude towards life, with Einziger saying at the time, "after letting go of Gavin, I wasn't even sure if I wanted to acquire another member into the band, but then we met Chris and my opinion instantly changed." Following the end of the audition, Kilmore was given a cassette tape with 16 live recordings of Fungus Amongus and S.C.I.E.N.C.E. songs, as he had not heard any of the band's music at that point. In 2019, he recalled "later that night, they said, 'Can you come rehearse on Sunday?' I was like, 'No. It’s Valentine's Day, and I’m dating a Dominican redhead from Queens. So I cannot miss that.' So then, they were like, 'Well can you learn all these songs on Monday? Because we have a show on Tuesday.' I said yeah."

Later in 1998, the third and final single "New Skin" was released. It had more of a promotional push than their previous two singles, and was their first full-scale marketed attempt at radio play. The cover for the CD release of the single included a group shot of the band, which had Kilmore instead of DJ Lyfe. That year, the new lineup played shows with Far, Limp Bizkit and British band One Minute Silence, in addition to performing at the 1998 edition of Ozzfest, and at the inaugural edition of Korn's Family Values Tour. According to Kilmore, the band played a total of 305 shows between the time he joined the band and the end of 1998. Incubus were able to get on Ozzfest 1998 since Ozzy Osbourne's son Jack liked the band's music. He also helped them get on the 2000 edition of Ozzfest, and at the urging of Sharon Osbourne and the Osbourne family, Incubus were chosen as a support act for some of Black Sabbath's reunion shows in January 1999. These shows included Pantera as another support act. In 2011, Einziger labelled the Osbournes as a "great family" and "fantastic people" for helping them get on these tours and supporting their music career. Einziger said he developed a friendship with the Osbourne family, and later in 2002 he and Pasillas worked on a song for Kelly Osbourne, the daughter of Ozzy Osbourne. Boyd recalled in 2021 that while touring with Black Sabbath in January 1999, the members of Pantera made fun of Incubus for wearing "baggy jeans", and at one point came to their dressing room with a platter that had new wrangler jeans and shots of Jack Daniel's whiskey. They urged them to try on the jeans and take a shot, with Boyd saying "I think I still have them somewhere and took a shot and almost threw up... never been a big drinker." Katunich later remembered that they had to play their heaviest songs while on metal-oriented tours such as these, in order to go over well with the crowds. During the touring cycle for S.C.I.E.N.C.E., they performed covers of "Powerslave" by Iron Maiden and "I Want You Back" by The Jackson Five. Years later, Michael Jackson's daughter Paris Jackson would open for Incubus. Boyd found out that his girlfriend who he had been dating since 1991 was having an affair while he was away on tour for S.C.I.E.N.C.E.. This event inspired the lyrical themes for Incubus's next album Make Yourself, which was noted for having a more accessible sound. Writing for Make Yourself began in early 1999, after the shows with Black Sabbath and Pantera.

Regarding the change in direction on Make Yourself, Kilmore reflected in 2002, "I think what it was when we were touring behind S.C.I.E.N.C.E. was seeing all these other bands out there who were ripping off bands like Korn and the Deftones and 311, bands that we enjoy and that we love, I think when we realized that and we went into the studio to write Make Yourself, we said 'OK, let's not do that.'" Kilmore also recalls that, "during S.C.I.E.N.C.E. our crowd was all teenage kids wearing black and they were all men. Once 'Pardon Me' started getting some traction the crowd turned into half-girl crowds. Then when 'Stellar' and 'Drive' came out, those half-girl crowds became all screaming teenage girls in the front row." Einziger stated, "It was a very masculine time in music and we were associated with that. We would be playing Ozzfest tours with all these different bands who were our good friends and there was pressure to be like that. I think the tenderness and emotional side of the [later] music was a reaction to all that aggressive music that was happening at that time. Our reaction was to go in the other direction." According to Boyd in 2019 it "felt a little strange to be associated with some of the bands around that time who were very deeply misogynistic in their content and vibrationally kind of violent."

== Release and reception ==
=== Commercial response ===
Professional ratings
Review scores
| Source | Rating |
|---|---|
| AllMusic | 3/5 stars |
| The Daily Vault | B+ |
| Encyclopedia of Popular Music | 3/5 stars |
| The Great Rock Discography | 6/10 |
| Modern Drummer | 3.5/5 stars |
| Pitchfork | 8.7/10 |
| The Rolling Stone Album Guide | 2/5 stars |
| Sputnikmusic | 4.5/5 |

In early 1999, S.C.I.E.N.C.E. and Enjoy Incubus were estimated to have sold a combined total of 200,000 units, with S.C.I.E.N.C.E. having sold around 150,000 copies at the beginning of 2000. Following their commercial breakthrough on Make Yourself, sales for S.C.I.E.N.C.E. began to increase. By 2001, it had sold 370,000 units in the United States. Epic/Immortal released a remastered version of the album during November 2001, and in the next year sales rose to 500,000. The remastering for the 2001 reissue was done at Marcussen Mastering, and it came as an enhanced CD that included the music video for "A Certain Shade of Green". Einziger said in 2011 that S.C.I.E.N.C.E. had sold nearly a million copies in the United States, and over a million when combined with international sales.

=== Critical response ===
Critics wrote favorably of the album's diverse style. Pitchfork gave it an 8.7 out of 10, stating "this CD successfully combines all sorts of shit without sounding like a mess. Here you have a song: it's got a phat-chunk bass beat twanging fast in back, some crazy electro squornks and bleeps coming and going, sudden snatches of full-blown guitar-jam, a rapid-fire Patton-esque vocalist (Brandon Boyd), all the while someone scratching vinyl and a drummer back there hammering merrily along." AllMusic reviewer David Thomas wrote that the band "manages to make their songs upbeat and danceable as well as tunes to headbang to. An admirable feat in a genre that tends to reward decibel levels instead of quality."

On April 11, 1998, Darren Kerr of the Vancouver publication Drop D praised the album's incorporation of turntablism and trip hop. Kerr also noted similarities between Faith No More, who would announce their breakup just nine days later, writing "I would not dispute that Brandon of the Jungle's evil-lounge-singer-morphing-into-teeth-gnashing-maniac vocal style is emulative of Mike Patton. I also would not argue that a couple of these songs would not sound out of place alongside FNM tracks like 'Caffeine' or 'The Gentle Art of Making Enemies'. However, guitarist Michael Einzinger and bassist Alex Katunich are mining a groove vein uniquely their own." CMJ New Music Report wrote in their September 1997 review that, "you've heard this kind of hip hop/metal fusion from bands like Faith No More, Living Colour, Rage Against the Machine and Biohazard, but Incubus has got a bit more funk in its trunk than any of those artists." They noted the album "distinguishes itself from run-of-the-mill surf/skate metal by including a real live DJ (DJ Lyfe) who thrashes as hard on the turntable as the rest of the guys." The review goes on to state that the band manages to create "monstrous riffs", saying "S.C.I.E.N.C.E.'s most memorable songs are the ones in which Incubus proudly bares its metal muscles." Spin in 1998 pointed out not only the band's usage of turntables, but also their usage of the didgeridoo and djembe instruments. In his August 1998 review, Jason Hradil of The Lantern wrote that Boyd has "an intense voice similar to Faith No More's Mike Patton." He further wrote, "Incubus changes tempo and style at least two to three times per song" and "one thing I'll guarantee, is that these young men will bring home their report cards with an 'A' in science." In an October 1997 article focusing on an Incubus concert with 311 and Sugar Ray, Dan Nailen of the Moscow-Pullman Daily News had a positive view of the band's music. He wrote, "combining super-phat beats, rap-style turntable-scratching and crunchy heavy-metal guitar riffs, Incubus is nothing if not unique. Add to the musical mix the pilable vocals of frontman Brandon Boyd, reminiscent of Faith No More's Mike Patton, and you have music as interesting as Sugar Ray's is lame." Matt Peiken of Modern Drummer magazine awarded it three and a half out of five stars in March 1998. He praised the band's technical ability but noted a lack of focus on the album, saying "Incubus plays with listeners' minds in Faith No More-ish fashion [and] at times it's hard to tell whether the band is attempting to dish out some serious music or simply kicking out kitsch."

=== Accolades ===
VH1 ranked the album tenth on their 2015 list of "The 12 Most Underrated Nu Metal Albums", while Revolver included it on a 2021 list of the "20 Essential Nu-Metal Albums". In 2020, Metal Hammer listed it as being one of the best metal albums released between 1996 and 1997, and also included it in their lists of the top 10 albums of 1997 and the top 20 best metal albums of 1997. When ranking Incubus's discography in 2020, Kerrang! placed S.C.I.E.N.C.E. third, remarking, "for fans of the band’s heavier, zanier leanings, this remains the high bar against which Incubus releases are now measured. Given the subsequent departures from this template, however, it’s likely those early adopters have been left disappointed. You could therefore argue that S.C.I.E.N.C.E. is something of a creative albatross around the band’s neck." In 2024, Ultimate Guitar included it on a list titled "10 Classic Albums That Defined the '90s Alternative Metal Scene".

== Legacy ==
Dylan P. Gadino of CMJ New Music Monthly reflected in November 2001 that Incubus "dropped their major-label debut, S.C.I.E.N.C.E., the same year as some nix-metal founders — 1997 also saw the releases of Limp Bizkit's Three Dollar Bill, Y'all and Sevendust's eponymous disc — yet Incubus's music [was] generally more inspired and layered than the efforts of their brooding counterparts." In November 2001, Amy Sciarretto of sister publication CMJ New Music Report further wrote, "Incubus was poised to be hard rock's bastard child of Faith No More and Primus thanks to its resident hottie Brandon Boyd's easy-on-the-ears emulation of Mike Patton and Dirk Lance's bass thwapping. But between 1997's S.C.I.E.N.C.E. and 1999's Make Yourself, the album that broke Incubus at rock radio, the band took a stylistic turn." Rolling Stone commented in 2002 that "they broke through to the Ozzfest crowd with 1997's eclectic funk-metal album, S.C.I.E.N.C.E.." The 2003 book The Rough Guide to Rock claimed that it was "better and far more accomplished" than their previous releases Enjoy Incubus and Fungus Amongus. The book additionally states that it "gave the band a much smoother, groove-oriented sound. Splashes of funk were offset with driving riffage and spiky turntable shrapnel, while Boyd's lyrics began to encompass a more intellectual world-view than your average rock star."

In 2004, David Clayman of IGN called it "fairly impressive, considering the band's age and experience at the time of those recordings." That same year, Nick Romanow of the Daily Collegian reflected that with S.C.I.E.N.C.E., Incubus "had the potential to become the next Faith No More", noting that "the comparison was even heightened by charismatic frontman Brandon Boyd’s vocal similarities to Mike Patton, Faith No More’s innovative singer." He also said that by Morning View they had "abandoned their will to be as innovative as Faith No More". Vice in 2013 considered it to be their heaviest release, as well as "what a more elastic and bold Red Hot Chili Peppers could be like." Loudwire praised it in 2019, saying "before their music almost entirely mellowed out, Incubus were a high energy genre-bending band of misfits. The sophomore effort fused metal, hip-hop, trip-hop, funk, jazz and even a little bit of house music." On the album's 20th anniversary in 2017, Spin wrote that it mixes "cartoonish slap bass with bongwater-soaked guitar distortion [and] dubby drum-n-bass with samples from children’s audiobooks." They added, "you’d almost expect it to have died in a psychedelics-related car accident before it reached the distinguished age of 20."

Geddy Lee of Canadian rock band Rush was a fan of the album, and at one point expressed interest in collaborating with Incubus. Tosin Abasi, guitarist of progressive metal band Animals as Leaders, has mentioned being influenced by it, with his band later touring with Incubus in 2022. The band's greatest hits releases The Essential Incubus (2012) and Playlist: The Very Best of Incubus (2013) both include songs from the album, while their initial greatest hits release Monuments and Melodies (2009) only included an acoustic version of "A Certain Shade of Green", which was not recorded during the S.C.I.E.N.C.E. era. In 2003, the song "Vitamin" was also featured in the horror film Final Destination 2.

== Live performance ==
Incubus did not often perform songs from S.C.I.E.N.C.E. between the late 2000s and early 2010s, with Boyd telling Spin in 2017, "there was a period of years when we were knowingly rebelling against it, we were desperately trying to shake off the identity it had created around us. Our original fans would get mad, 'Why don’t you play more stuff from S.C.I.E.N.C.E.?' I think it only happened two or three years ago, when we were touring again, and started to revisit the songs casually in rehearsal studios and sound checks. We started to fall in love with them again. I think we just needed a friend break." He also said there are "tracks that are just kind of ridiculous, that we don’t really fuck with. One day we might."

== Track listing ==
All tracks are written by Incubus, except "A Certain Shade of Green", written by Incubus and Randy Muller.

| No. | Title | Length |
|---|---|---|
| 1. | "Redefine" | 3:22 |
| 2. | "Vitamin" | 3:13 |
| 3. | "New Skin" | 3:51 |
| 4. | "Idiot Box" | 4:07 |
| 5. | "Glass" | 3:37 |
| 6. | "Magic Medicine" | 3:03 |
| 7. | "A Certain Shade of Green" | 3:11 |
| 8. | "Favorite Things" | 3:11 |
| 9. | "Summer Romance (Anti-Gravity Love Song)" | 4:26 |
| 10. | "Nebula" | 3:50 |
| 11. | "Deep Inside" | 3:55 |
| 12. | "Calgone: "Segue 1" | 16:05 |
| Total length: | | 55:51 |

== Personnel ==
Incubus

- Brandon Boyd – lead vocals, percussion, didgeridoo on "Redefine"
- Mike Einziger – guitar, backing vocals
- Alex Katunich – bass
- Gavin Koppel – turntables
- José Pasillas – drums

Additional musicians

- Charles Waltz – violin on "Favorite Things"
- Jeremy Wasser – saxophone on "Summer Romance (Anti-Gravity Love Song)"
- Monty Kelly – samples on "Favorite Things"

Production

- Jim Wirt – producer
- Ulrich Wild – engineer
- CJ Eiriksson – engineer
- Donat Kazarinoff – engineer
- Matthew Kallen – assistant engineer
- Terry Date – mixing
- Stephen Marcussen – mastering, remastering
- Frank Harkins – art direction
- Chris McCann – photography

== Charts ==
=== Weekly charts ===
| Chart (2002) | Peak position |
|---|---|
| UK Albums (OCC) | 103 |

=== Year-end charts ===
| Chart (2002) | Position |
|---|---|
| Canadian Alternative Albums (Nielsen SoundScan) | 147 |
| Canadian Metal Albums (Nielsen SoundScan) | 73 |

== Certifications ==
| Region | Certification | Certified units/sales |
|---|---|---|
| United Kingdom (BPI) | Gold | 100,000^{^} |
| United States (RIAA) | Gold | 500,000^{^} |
^{^} Shipments figures based on certification alone.
