= When Incubus Attacks Volume 1 =

When Incubus Attacks, Vol. 1

EP by Incubus
- Released: August 22, 2000
- Recorded: 1999–2000
- Genre: Alternative rock
- Length: 27:19
- Label: Epic/Immortal

Incubus chronology
Make Yourself (1999)	When Incubus Attacks, Vol. 1 (2000)	Morning View (2001)

When Incubus Attacks, Vol. 1 is an EP that was released on August 22, 2000, by Incubus. The title is a parody of Cable's album title, When Animals Attack.

The tracks on this EP were recorded live during the 1999 and 2000 world tour of Make Yourself, as well as "Crowded Elevator", a song recorded during the recording of the Make Yourself album, previously unreleased outside of the Japanese pressing of Make Yourself, the European "Pardon Me" single, and the Australian "Drive" releases. A joke rap song, "We're Smoking The Herb Again", was recorded by the band and is a hidden track after "Pardon Me".

The US pressing of the EP was limited to 100,000 copies; however' the Canadian pressing is still widely available. The EP is also available online through the iTunes Store and many other online digital media stores.

== Reception ==
Professional ratings
Review scores
Source	Rating
AllMusic	3/5 stars

AllMusic awarded the EP three out of five stars, with their review stating, "part of Incubus's charm lies in its eclectic production touches, so it's heartening to hear that these songs stand up quite well even when stripped of zippy electronics and gut-wrenching riffs."

== Track listing ==
No.	Title	Length
1.	"Pardon Me" (Acoustic)	3:53
2.	"Stellar" (Acoustic)	3:15
3.	"Make Yourself" (Acoustic)	3:23
4.	"Crowded Elevator"	4:46
5.	"Favorite Things" (Live)	3:56
6.	"Pardon Me" (Live)	8:23
Total length:		27:19

- "Pardon Me" (Live) ends at 4:17. The hidden track "We're Smokin' the Herb Again" begins at 4:47, after 30 seconds of silence.
  - On the Canadian version, the hidden track is track 7.

== Origin of tracks ==
- 1997 – S.C.I.E.N.C.E. ("Favorite Things" (Live))
- 1999 – Make Yourself ("Pardon Me" (Acoustic), "Stellar" (Acoustic), "Make Yourself" (Acoustic) and "Pardon Me" (Live))
- 2000 – Scream 3 Soundtrack ("Crowded Elevator")
  - "Crowded Elevator" was also written during the Make Yourself writing sessions, but did not make it onto Make Yourself (except on the Japanese version)

== Personnel ==
- Brandon Boyd – lead vocals on all tracks except "We're Smokin' the Herb Again," backing vocals on "We're Smokin' the Herb Again"
- Mike Einziger – guitar, co-lead vocals on "We're Smokin' the Herb Again"
- Dirk Lance – bass
- Jose Pasillas – drums, co-lead vocals on "We're Smokin' the Herb Again"
- Chris Kilmore – turntables, co-lead vocals on "We're Smokin' the Herb Again"

== Charts ==
Album

Year	Chart	Position
2000	Billboard 200	41
