= New Skin =

New Skin may refer to:

- New Skin (CRX album), 2016
- New Skin (Jones album) or the title song, 2016
- New Skin, an album by Vérité, 2019
- "New Skin" (song), by Incubus, 1998
- "New Skin", a song by Methods of Mayhem from Methods of Mayhem, 1999
- "New Skin", a song by Siouxsie & the Banshees from the Showgirls film soundtrack, 1995

== See also ==
- Liquid bandage
- Scar
