= Take Me to Your Leader (Incubus song) =

Song by Incubus

from the album Fungus Amongus
- Released: November 1, 1995
- Studio: 4th Street Recording (Santa Monica, California)
- Length: 4:27
- Label: Chillum
- Songwriters: Brandon Boyd; Mike Einziger; Alex Katunich; Gavin Koppell; José Pasillas
- Producer: Jim Wirt

Music video
- "Take Me to Your Leader" on YouTube

"Take Me to Your Leader" is a song by American rock band Incubus. Originally released on the band's debut studio album, Fungus Amongus (1995), the song was later re-recorded for their second EP and major label debut, Enjoy Incubus (1997).

== Music video ==
An official music video was made for the song, the band's first music video at that point. The video is a reiteration of the comedy film The Gods Must Be Crazy.

The video opens with Brandon Boyd dressed as a caveman playing the djembe, before he is hit in the head by a glass bottle. Curious of the bottle's origin, it leads Boyd to discover a bustling freeway next to his forest as the other band members also appear dressed as cavemen. The video was also intercut with the band's live performance at the Troubadour in Hollywood, California on February 25, 1995.

Boyd continues to venture into Los Angeles as he is seen walking along the streets and taking the subway until he and the other band members are picked up by Gavin Koppell in a Volkswagen Beetle (a homage to the same car used by Cheech Marin in the 1987 film Born in East L.A.). Boyd continues to venture through the city as he asks several children where the bottle originated from to no avail. Finally, he makes his way to Los Angeles City Hall, as he and the other band members return to their forest with former city mayor Richard Riordan and several other policitians. Riordan awards Boyd with a Los Angeles Dodgers baseball cap as a small ribbon-cutting celebration takes place before the camera pans out revealing the forest to be in the middle of an on-ramp along Route 101. The video can be found on the band's DVD When Incubus Attacks Volume 2.

== Live performances ==
The song was a staple in the band's setlist early on, however, along with other Fungus Amongus songs, it soon vanished from the band's setlist by the end of the '90s. In 2004, the band performed the song live for the first time in 6 years, during a concert in London, England, much to fans' delight, with the band going on to play the song 9 times that year. It is to date the last Fungus Amongus/Enjoy Incubus song to be played live.
