= The Wild Trapeze =

Studio album by Brandon Boyd
- Released: July 6, 2010
- Studios: Tarbox Studios, Cassadaga, New York, US
- Genres: Acoustic; alternative rock; indie rock
- Length: 35:47
- Label: Epic
- Producer: Dave Fridmann

Singles from The Wild Trapeze
- 1. "Runaway Train" Released: June 21, 2010; 2. "Last Night a Passenger" Released: October 20, 2010

The Wild Trapeze is the debut solo album by the American singer Brandon Boyd, vocalist of the rock band Incubus. It was released on disc and through iTunes on July 6, 2010.

Boyd has described the album's sound as

"a guy in a room surrounded by toys who has an undying enthusiasm for finding out what each toy does, and has been given full license to make as much noise as he pleases."

On June 21, 2010, a music video for the album's first single, "Runaway Train", was released online.

The Wild Trapeze debuted at #33 on the Billboard 200, selling 11,109 copies

== Track listing ==
All tracks are written by Brandon Boyd

No.	Title	Length
1.	"The Wild Trapeze"	4:12
2.	"Here Comes Everyone"	3:46
3.	"Dance While the Devil Sleeps"	3:09
4.	"A Night without Cars"	4:26
5.	"Revenge of the Spectral Tiger"	4:02
6.	"Courage and Control"	3:52
7.	"Runaway Train"	3:24
8.	"Last Night a Passenger"	4:12
9.	"Mirror of Venus"	2:24
10.	"All Ears Avow!"	2:20

== Personnel ==
- Brandon Boyd – vocals, guitar, drums, bass, timpani, chimes, glockenspiel
- Dave Fridmann – production, keyboards
- Jon Theodore – drums
