= Fungus Amongus =

Studio album by Incubus
- Released: November 1, 1995
- Studio: 4th Street Recording (Santa Monica, California)
- Genres: Funk metal; nu metal; alternative metal
- Length: 38:08
- Label: Chillum
- Producers: Jim Wirt; Incubus (co.)

Incubus chronology
Let Me Tell Ya 'Bout Root Beer (1995)	Fungus Amongus (1995)	Enjoy Incubus (1997)

Fungus Amongus is the debut studio album by American rock band Incubus, released on November 1, 1995, by Chillum Records, Incubus' own independent label. It was later re-released under Epic and Immortal Records on November 7, 2000, after popular demand.

== Background ==
Incubus formed in 1991, while its members were still in high school, and recorded several demos over the next few years. In 2017, drummer José Pasillas described Fungus Amongus as "our first concerted effort at putting a group of songs together on an LP". However, guitarist Mike Einziger has said that he views it as a compilation of demos they had recorded while in high school, rather than as a cohesive studio album. He stated in 2017, "making recordings back then was really challenging, especially for a bunch of high school kids. We didn't have access to anything. We didn't have money to make recordings. We didn't have a studio. We didn't have any equipment. We didn't know how to use the equipment. But we slowly began to meet certain people. We ended up working with a producer who owned a recording studio." Einziger also claimed in 2011 that the writing process was different to later records, since the band hadn't done any touring yet at that time. He said, "it's definitely different when you're in kind of a closed environment and writing music for your friends, which is what I think we were doing in our pre-S.C.I.E.N.C.E. days." Incubus had trouble attracting the interest of major labels during their early years, which led to them releasing Fungus Amongus independently in 1995. The band printed 1,000 copies and sold all of them. Vocalist Brandon Boyd remembered in 2020, "It was a win for us, but let me tell you like selling 1,000 copies was hard. When we did get to work with a major label, it was definitely exciting."

The album cover image is of a fly agaric mushroom. Many of the names given under "Personnel" are actually pseudonyms for the band members. "Fabio" is Mike Einziger; "Dirk Lance" is bassist Alex Katunich, who later adopted the moniker as his stage name; "Brandy Flower" is an actual Sony employee; and "Happy Knappy" is Brandon Boyd. "Bett" and "Brett Spivery" refer to Brett Spivey, longtime friend of the band, who went on to make their first two DVDs and the videos for "I Miss You" and "Summer Romance (Anti-Gravity Love Song)".

"Hilikus", "Shaft!", "Take Me to Your Leader", and "You Will Be a Hot Dancer" were all re-recorded for the 1997 Enjoy Incubus EP, which was the band's first release after signing to Epic/Immortal Records in 1996. The EP also included additional material, such as a new song called "Version". The re-recordings of the Fungus Amongus tracks featured added DJ scratches by DJ Lyfe, who joined Incubus in late 1995, after Fungus Amongus had been released. The re-recording of "Hilikus" had a new, untitled hidden track, which plays after several minutes of silence. On this release, some of the band members were given new pseudonyms; Einziger's was "Dynamike", Boyd's was "Brandon of the Jungle", and DJ Lyfe's was "Kid Lyfe". On S.C.I.E.N.C.E. the band continued to create new pseudonyms, before abandoning this concept on later releases.

=== Music and lyrics ===
Stylistically, Fungus Amongus shows strong influences of funk metal bands such as Faith No More, Red Hot Chili Peppers, Primus, and Mr. Bungle, most of whom are mentioned in the liner notes of the 2000 reissue. In subsequent interviews, Boyd has cited all of these artists as influences on the band and has mentioned his enjoyment at later having Incubus perform alongside them, including with Mr. Bungle at the 2000 SnoCore Tour and with Faith No More at the 2015 Soundwave Festival in Australia. In a 1995 review of an Incubus concert, Traci Esslinger of Music Connection magazine described their sound as "funk-thrash" , noting that the "vast majority of songs begin with oozing funk grooves". The group also presents a quasi-rap style on Fungus Amongus, which continued onto 1997's S.C.I.E.N.C.E., showing Boyd rapping on songs such as "Psychopsilocybin", "Trouble in 421", "Speak Free", and "Take Me to Your Leader".

Boyd reflected in a 2012 interview that Fungus Amongus was "a very accurate statement of where we were at that time. We were teenagers and had little to no knowledge or understanding of the world. We were learning how to write songs and be a band and had no concept or idea that those recordings would stick. It was almost outsider art. I think Fungus Amongus and S.C.I.E.N.C.E. were Incubus still finding our distinctive voice. So those albums are schizoid amalgamations of many of the bands we were obsessing over in the early to mid-nineties."

== Reception and legacy ==
Professional ratings
Review scores
Source	Rating
AllMusic	2/5 stars
Kerrang!	2/5 stars
The Rolling Stone Album Guide	1/5 stars

Upon initial release, the album failed to chart; however, when re-released in 2000 by Epic/Immortal Records, it managed to peak at number 116 on the Billboard 200. The album received generally negative reviews from critics. Dean Carlson of AllMusic wrote, "Incubus' independent debut is an unremarkable take on suburban MTV funk." He also criticized frontman Brandon Boyd, writing, "there's much to dislike, notably frontman Brandon Boyd, who growls like he wants the voice of anybody but himself". Tim Grierson of About.com observed, "at this early stage, Incubus just sounded like a tired rehash of Rage Against the Machine and Red Hot Chili Peppers." In 2001, Spin labeled the album as "goofy" and "Primus-obsessed."

The New Rolling Stone Album Guide (2004) gave the album one star out of five. The review states, "although it may only be vaguely recalled, the great funk metal scare occurred at the dawn of the 90s, between the waning of hair metal and the waxing of grunge." It adds that "Incubus was a latecomer to a boomlet of shirtless suburban funkateers who were greatly inspired by the Red Hot Chili Peppers, Primus and Faith No More" and that "Fungus Amongus, a compendium of slapped bass and forced wackiness, seemed hopelessly dated in 1995." The 2003 book The Rough Guide to Rock describes the album as "a rough-and-ready amalgam of funk, rock, metal and wilful weirdness that merely hinted at what Incubus would go on to produce." Frank Guan of Vulture stated in 2017 that it was "a sincere and skilled pastiche of their funk-drunk idols" and characterized its lyrical content as having "references to 4/20, space aliens, and psilocybin mushrooms."

In 2020, Ultimate Guitar included it on their list of "Top 8 Iconic Funk Metal Albums". Loudwire added it to a list titled "26 Bands Who Sound Nothing Like Their First Album". They stated, "taking cues from Faith No More, Primus and hip-hop, the funk-first rap/rock of Fungus Amongus was a snapshot of heavy music in 1995."

When looking back on Incubus's discography in a 2017 interview with Kerrang!, Boyd observed, "[Fungus Amongus] was super-fun to make, but we didn't know what we were doing. I guess that's why a lot of our fans love that record, but for me when I hear it I truly cringe. I would just as soon bury it forever." In a 2022 Louder Sound article, Boyd placed it last in his ranking of the eight Incubus studio albums. He said, "it doesn't feel like a studio album. It was barely mixed and recorded — S.C.I.E.N.C.E. was the first time we had a recording budget." When ranking the band's eight studio albums in 2020, Kerrang! placed Fungus Amongus seventh, ahead of only their 2011 album, If Not Now, When? In 2023, Alternative Press placed it fifth in their ranking, saying that "while the band could surely play, nothing was polished or breakthrough quite yet."

== Live performance ==
The band has not performed any songs from Fungus Amongus or Enjoy Incubus since 2004. That year, they performed "Take Me to Your Leader" nine times on their A Crow Left of the Murder... tour, having then not played it since 1998. Their last performances of any of the other Fungus Amongus songs were in 2000. The intro to "Trouble in 421" was briefly played at a July 2011 show in Los Angeles, which was recorded as part of their Incubus HQ Live release. While Incubus still regularly performs certain songs from S.C.I.E.N.C.E., Boyd asserted in 2012 that the band has no intention of performing tracks from Fungus Amongus again. He remarked, "what's funny is people are still asking for a lot of those songs. We're very happy that they exist, but we just as soon let them exist in recordings. I don't even know if we'd know how to play them."

== Track listing ==
All tracks are written by Incubus.

No.	Title	Length
1.	"You Will Be a Hot Dancer"	3:47
2.	"Shaft!"	3:14
3.	"Trouble in 421"	4:41
4.	"Take Me to Your Leader"	4:27
5.	"Medium"	3:12
6.	"Speak Free"	4:55
7.	"The Answer"	3:02
8.	"Psychopsilocybin"	4:20
9.	"Sink Beneath the Line"	3:15
10.	"Hilikus"	3:15
Total length:		38:08

== Personnel ==
Incubus

- Happy Knappy – vocals, djembe
- Fabio – guitars
- Dirk Lance – bass
- Salsa – drums

Technical personnel

- Jim Wirt – producer, engineer, mixing
- Incubus – co-producers

== Charts ==
Chart (2000)	Peak position
US Billboard 200	116
