= New Skin (song) =

Single by Incubus

from the album S.C.I.E.N.C.E.
- Released: September 22, 1998
- Studio: 4th Street Recording (Santa Monica, California)
- Length: 3:51
- Label: Immortal; Epic
- Songwriters: Brandon Boyd; Mike Einziger; Alex Katunich; Gavin Koppell; José Pasillas
- Producer: Jim Wirt

Incubus singles chronology
"A Certain Shade of Green" (1997)	"New Skin" (1998)	"Pardon Me" (1999)

"New Skin" is a song by American rock band Incubus. It was released as the second single from their second studio album, S.C.I.E.N.C.E. (1997). It reached #38 on the Billboard Active Rock chart in 1998. It originally appeared on their EP Let Me Tell Ya 'Bout Root Beer.

The song's bridge samples systems theorist Buckminster Fuller's quote, "Until the Twentieth Century, reality was everything humans could touch, smell, see, and hear. Since the initial publication of the chart of the electromagnetic spectrum, humans have learned that what they can touch, smell, see, and hear is less than one-millionth of reality."

== Reception ==
"New Skin" was ranked #1 by Billboard on their list of Incubus' 11 greatest songs.

== Track listing ==
US Promo CD (1997)

1. "New Skin"

US Promo CD (1998)

1. "New Skin"
2. "CD ROM data Track"

== Personnel ==
- Brandon Boyd – lead vocals, djembe
- Mike Einziger – guitar, backing vocals
- Alex Katunich – bass
- Gavin Koppel – turntables, keyboards
- José Pasillas – drums

== Cover versions ==
The song was covered by The One Hundred for the Metal Hammer Goes '90s cover album.
