= The One Hundred (band) =

English heavy metal band (2014–2018)

- Origin: Guildford, Surrey, England
- Genres: Nu metal; rap metal; metalcore; nu metalcore
- Years active: 2014–2018
- Labels: UNFD; Spinefarm Records
- Members: Jacob Field; Tim Hider; Phil Kneller; Joe Balchin
- Website: theonehundredband.com

The One Hundred were an English heavy metal band formed in Guildford, England, in 2014. The band released their debut EP, Subculture, via Australian independent label, UNFD, in 2014, and have toured extensively across the United Kingdom and Europe, as well as performing at major festivals such as Sonisphere, Download Festival and Reading and Leeds. In September 2016, the band announced via their social media that they had signed to Spinefarm Records, a division of Universal Music Group.

Their debut album, Chaos + Bliss, was released on 2 June 2017. It received positive reviews.

In July 2018, the band announced via their social media that they have dissolved.

== History ==
Initially the brainchild of vocalist Jacob Field and guitarist Tim Hider, The One Hundred began life as a writing/production project with neither member intending on performing the songs live themselves. As the songs developed it became apparent that there were no groups in existence that inhabited this specific sphere of music and accordingly the writing project became a band. Phil Kneller was recruited on bass, having formerly played alongside Field and Hider in metalcore outfit Collapse The Control, and Joe Balchin joined on drums in late 2013. Balchin had previously played in notable Surrey band Open The Skies and prior to that in the band Fly This For Me alongside Hannah Greenwood who later went on to join the band Creeper.

In October 2013, the band launched their debut single, "Breed". It picked up early support from BBC Radio 1. Later, the band would go on to record a full session at Maida Vale Studios for the Radio 1 Rock Show. The band's second single, "Kingsmen", followed in quick succession. In 2014, the band went on to record a cover of Iggy Azalea's "Black Widow". The cover was premiered on BBC Radio 1.

Their debut EP, Subculture, was released digitally, through Australian independent label, UNFD. The release was met with positive reviews, many citing that Field's "distinctive British accent" gave them a unique sound. Leading up to the EP's release, the band joined British rap metal band Hacktivist on the Download Freezes Over tour.

Following the reviews received for the EP, the band on to tour in the United Kingdom with Papa Roach in March 2015 ahead of playing at Download Festival. They later toured with Eskimo Callboy before playing at Reading and Leeds 2015. The band were then invited to play three UK arena shows with Mötley Crüe and wrapped up 2015 with a sizable tour with Japanese band Crossfaith - seeing the band tour mainland Europe for the first time. In 2016, the band played at Slam Dunk Festival.

The band have released five music videos: "Kingsmen", "Downfall", "Unleashed", "Dark Matters" and "Monster". All five videos have received television support from Kerrang TV and Scuzz. On 20 October 2014, "Unleashed" was released as a single.

On 6 February 2017, the band debuted a track from their debut album, "Dark Matters", on Daniel P. Carter's Radio One Rock Show. The second track to be released from the album, "Monster", was also launched on the BBC Radio One Rock Show, on 27 April 2017.

On 2 June 2017, the band released their debut album, Chaos + Bliss. The album is available as digital download, CD and vinyl.

On 26 July 2018, the band announced via their Facebook page that they have ceased activities as a band.

In June 2020, the band posthumously released a live EP recorded in 2015, available only digitally.

== Musical style ==
The One Hundred's sound incorporates elements of heavy metal, hip-hop, rock, and dance. The band's musical style has been described as nu metal, rap metal, metalcore, nu metalcore, rap rock, and electronic rock.

Their debut EP, Subculture, released in 2014, has been noted for its collision of genres such as grime, metalcore, and electronica.

HEAVY Music Magazine has classified the band's sound as "a medley of nu-metal, hip-hop, and rock", while the website Rock Sins has labeled their style as a "blend of rap, electronica and metalcore".

== Critical reception ==
The One Hundred have received praise from several music critics and publications. In his review of the band's debut EP for Kerrang!, James Mackinnon described the band's songs as "a hurricane of crowd slaying songs". In his positive review, Metal Hammer's Luke Morton described the release as "full of rip roaring battle cries". Big Cheese went on to state that "The One Hundred will look back at Subculture as the EP that changed the game they are only just beginning".

== Discography ==
=== Extended plays ===
| Title | Album details |
|---|---|
| Subculture | Released: 1 September 2014; Label: UNFD (TOHEP001); Format: digital download |

=== Studio albums ===
| Title | Album details |
|---|---|
| Chaos + Bliss | Released: 2 June 2017; Label: Spinefarm Records; Format: digital download, CD and vinyl |

=== Other appearances ===
List of non-single guest appearances, showing year released and album name
| Title | Year | Album |
|---|---|---|
| "New Skin" (Incubus cover) | 2017 | Metal Hammer Goes '90s |
