= Drive (Incubus song) =

2000 single by Incubus

Single by Incubus

from the album Make Yourself
- Released: November 14, 2000
- Studio: NRG (North Hollywood)
- Genre: Alternative rock; post-grunge
- Length: 3:52
- Label: Epic; Immortal
- Songwriters: Brandon Boyd; Mike Einziger; Chris Kilmore; Alex Katunich; José Pasillas
- Producers: Scott Litt; Incubus

Incubus singles chronology
"Stellar" (2000)	"Drive" (2000)	"Wish You Were Here" (2001)

Audio sample
- A sample from "Drive" by Incubus: file; help

Music video
- "Drive" on YouTube

"Drive" is a song by American rock band Incubus, released on November 14, 2000, as the third single from their third album, Make Yourself (1999). It is the band's biggest hit and breakthrough single, eventually reaching the top of the US Billboard Modern Rock Tracks chart on March 3, 2001, and number nine on the Billboard Hot 100 on July 28, 2001. It also reached number four in Portugal, number 13 in New Zealand, number 34 in Australia, and number 40 in the United Kingdom. In 2001, "Drive" won Modern Rock Single of the Year at the 2001 Billboard Music Awards.

== Lyrics ==
According to Incubus lead singer Brandon Boyd, "The lyric is basically about fear, about being driven all your life by it and making decisions from fear. It's about imagining what life would be like if you didn't live it that way."

== Reception and legacy ==
Sean Adams of Drowned in Sound gave the song an 8 out of 10 in his 2001 review. He wrote that "maybe it can be called a rock ballad, I mean it does have the odd harmony, drum smack and a guitar or two. What makes this different is the lil’ samples and scratches and the voice of Brandon." Adams also added, "by stereotypical definition Brandon Boyd is a heartthrob, but to thousands (at the moment), rather than millions and that is because for some reason Incubus haven't had the kick from the media they deserve."

In 2023, for the 35th anniversary of the Alternative Airplay chart (which was called Modern Rock Tracks at the time of the song's release), Billboard ranked "Drive" as the 15th-most successful song in the chart's history. That same year, "Drive" and Hoobastank's "The Reason" both experienced surges in streaming numbers after being featured on an episode of Netflix's series Beef. Billboard described the two songs as a "pair of alt-metal ballads." The publication also placed it 82nd on a 2021 list of "The 100 Greatest Car Songs of All Time". In 2024, Consequence placed it 37th on their list of the "50 Kick-Butt Post-Grunge Songs We Can Get Behind", stating that "Incubus' Brandon Boyd has garnered many comparisons to Faith No More's Mike Patton, who bore his own influence on the post-grunge scene — but on 'Drive,' the band combined their smartest impulses to form their signature hit, with a sound only Incubus could boast."

== Music video ==
Directed by Phil Harder and based on M.C. Escher's Drawing Hands, the music video features a simple musical session intercut with a rotoscoped animation of Brandon Boyd drawing himself, which was handled by both Boyd and drummer José Pasillas. The non-animated scenes were shot in the McNamara Alumni Center at the University of Minnesota. The video was nominated for Best Group Video at the 2001 MTV Video Music Awards, but lost to "Pop" by NSYNC. In 2018, the staff of Metal Hammer included the video in the site's list of "the 13 best nu metal videos".

== Track listings ==
Australian maxi-CD single

1. "Drive" – 3:52
2. "Crowded Elevator" – 4:44
3. "Stellar" (acoustic) – 3:16
4. "Pardon Me" (acoustic) – 3:46
5. "Drive" (acoustic) – 3:52

UK CD single

1. "Drive"
2. "Drive" (acoustic)
3. "Clean" (live)
4. "Drive" (video)

UK 7-inch EP

A1. "Drive" (live orchestral version) – 4:05
B1. "Favorite Things" (live) – 3:45
B2. "Pardon Me" (live) – 4:18

European CD1

1. "Drive" (album version) – 3:52
2. "Pardon Me" (live) – 4:18

European CD2

1. "Drive" (album version) – 3:52
2. "Drive" (orchestral studio version) – 3:55
3. "Favorite Things" (live) – 3:45
4. "Pardon Me" (live) – 4:18
5. "Clean" (live)

== Credits and personnel ==
Credits are taken from the European CD2 liner notes.

Studios

- Recorded at NRG Recording Studios (North Hollywood, Los Angeles)
- Mastered at A&M Studios (Hollywood, California, US)

Incubus

- Incubus – production
  - Brandon Boyd – writing
  - Mike Einziger – writing
  - Dirk Lance – writing
  - Chris Kilmore – writing
  - José Pasillas – writing

Additional musicians

- Dave Holdridge – cello, digital editing

Other personnel

- Scott Litt – production, mixing
- Rick Will – mixing
- Michael "Elvis" Baskette – engineering
- Matt Griffin – assistant engineering
- Evan Hollander – assistant engineering
- Stephen Marcussen – mastering
- Brandy Flower – design
- Danny Clinch – photography

== Charts ==
=== Weekly charts ===
2000–2001 weekly chart performance for "Drive"
Chart (2000–2001)	Peak position
Australia (ARIA)	34
Canada CHR (Nielsen BDS)	9
Germany (GfK)	80
Iceland (Dagblaðið Vísir Top 20)	5
New Zealand (Recorded Music NZ)	13
Portugal (AFP)	4
Quebec (ADISQ)	20
Scottish Singles Sales (Official Charts)	36
Switzerland (Schweizer Hitparade)	85
UK Singles (Official Charts)	40
US Billboard Hot 100	9
US Adult Alternative Airplay (Billboard)	5
US Adult Pop Airplay (Billboard)	4
US Alternative Airplay (Billboard)	1
US Mainstream Rock (Billboard)	8
US Pop Airplay (Billboard)	8

2025 weekly chart performance for "Drive"
Chart (2025)	Peak position
Israel International Airplay (Media Forest)	18

=== Year-end charts ===
2001 year-end chart performance for "Drive"
Chart (2001)	Position
Australia (ARIA)	92
Canada (Nielsen SoundScan)	183
Canada Radio (Nielsen BDS)	11
New Zealand (RIANZ)	29
US Billboard Hot 100	21
US Adult Top 40 (Billboard)	7
US Mainstream Rock Tracks (Billboard)	20
US Mainstream Top 40 (Billboard)	29
US Modern Rock Tracks (Billboard)	1
US Triple-A (Billboard)	12

2002 year-end chart performance for "Drive"
Chart (2002)	Position
US Adult Top 40 (Billboard)	91

=== Decade-end charts ===
Decade-end chart performance for "Drive"
Chart (2000–2009)	Position
US Hot Alternative Songs (Billboard)	16
US Hot Rock Songs (Billboard)	20

== Certifications ==
Certifications and sales for "Drive"
Region	Certification	Certified units/sales
Australia (ARIA)	Gold	35,000^{^}
Italy (FIMI)	Gold	50,000^{‡}
New Zealand (RMNZ)	5× Platinum	150,000^{‡}
United Kingdom (BPI)	Gold	400,000^{‡}
^{^} Shipments figures based on certification alone.^{‡} Sales+streaming figures based on certification alone.

== Release history ==
Release dates and formats for "Drive"
Region	Date	Format(s)	Label(s)	Ref.
United States	November 14, 2000	Alternative radio	Epic; Immortal	
United States	February 5, 2001	Hot adult contemporary radio	Epic; Immortal	
United States	February 6, 2001	Contemporary hit radio	Epic; Immortal	
Australia	April 16, 2001	CD	Epic; Immortal	
United Kingdom	June 11, 2001	7-inch vinyl; CD	Epic	
