= Sons of the Sea (album) =

Studio album by Sons of the Sea
- Released: September 24, 2013
- Recorded: 2013
- Genre: Alternative rock
- Length: 39:00
- Label: Avow! Records
- Producer: Brendan O'Brien

Sons of the Sea chronology
Compass (2013)	Sons of the Sea (2013)

Sons of the Sea is the self-titled debut album by American alternative rock band Sons of the Sea, a collaboration between vocalist Brandon Boyd and producer Brendan O'Brien. It was released on September 24, 2013 through Avow Records (distribution through INgrooves) in North America. The album was released in Europe through Membran Entertainment on March 3, 2014 and contains 3 acoustic bonus tracks: Space and Time, Come Together and Lady Black. A video for 'Come Together' featuring Boyd and Adesuwa Pariyapasat was directed by Taylor Cohen and first aired on the day of the North American release.

== Track listing ==
All tracks are written by Boyd/O'Brien except "Hey, That's No Way to Say Goodbye", which was written by Leonard Cohen.

No.	Title	Length
1.	"Jet Black Crow"	4:17
2.	"Space and Time"	4:18
3.	"Untethered"	4:16
4.	"Plus/Minus"	3:52
5.	"Great Escape"	3:48
6.	"Come Together"	3:48
7.	"Where All the Songs Come From"	4:10
8.	"Avalanche"	3:15
9.	"Lady Black"	3:36
10.	"Hey, That's No Way to Say Goodbye*"	3:35

== Personnel ==
Sons of the Sea

- Brandon Boyd – performer, engineering, drums
- Brendan O'Brien – performer, engineering, producer

Additional personnel

- Josh Freese – drums
- Jamie Muhoberac – piano (track 8)
- Jackie O'Brien – additional background vocals (track 10)
- Tom Syrowski – engineering
- Peter Mack – assistant engineer
- Kyle Stevens – assistant engineer
- Martin Cooke – additional engineering
- Billy Joe Bowers – mastering
