= Make Yourself =

Studio album by Incubus
- Released: October 26, 1999
- Studio: NRG (Los Angeles)
- Genres: Alternative metal; nu metal; alternative rock; funk rock
- Length: 48:04
- Labels: Epic; Immortal
- Producers: Incubus; Scott Litt

Incubus chronology
S.C.I.E.N.C.E. (1997)	Make Yourself (1999)	When Incubus Attacks Volume 1 (2000)

Singles from Make Yourself
- 1. "Pardon Me" Released: October 5, 1999; 2. "Stellar" Released: June 13, 2000; 3. "Drive" Released: November 14, 2000

Make Yourself is the third studio album by American rock band Incubus. It was released on October 26, 1999, through Epic and Immortal Records. The album received double platinum certification by the RIAA and produced three charting singles—"Pardon Me", "Stellar", and "Drive"—all of which reached the top three on Billboard's Alternative Songs chart, with the latter topping the chart and also becoming the band's sole top ten hit to date on the Billboard Hot 100, where it peaked at No. 9.

The album is the first to be recorded with new turntablist Chris Kilmore, who joined in February 1998 and replaced DJ Lyfe.

== Writing and recording ==
The songs for the album were written following an exhausting tour for their full-length major label debut S.C.I.E.N.C.E.. Touring for S.C.I.E.N.C.E. began in mid-1997, once they had finished recording it, and covered the entirety of 1998, with the band playing over 300 shows that year alone. The S.C.I.E.N.C.E. touring cycle concluded in January 1999, following a run of shows with Black Sabbath and Pantera. The shows with Black Sabbath were as part of their reunion tour, and Incubus was put on this tour on the insistence of the Osbourne family, who also put them on the 1998 edition of Ozzfest, since Jack Osbourne liked their music. Brandon Boyd reflected in a 2020 Kerrang! article, "when we got home, we started coming up with ideas and gave ourselves eight weeks to write the record and in those eight weeks, all the songs that appear on the album came out." In a 1999 interview, Boyd mentioned that "Nowhere Fast" originated through improvisational live jams during the S.C.I.E.N.C.E. tour, remarking "we've been exploring drum-'n'-bass here and there on stage, playing little improvisational ditties in between real songs from the records. José [Pasillas, drummer] would start playing a drum-'n'-bass he'd made up, I'd play my didgeridoo to it, and [it] started forming out of live things like that." For Make Yourself, turntablist Chris Kilmore intended to use a scratch record of sounds he had recorded over the years. However, it took two and a half weeks for Kilmore to get this record made, which led to him not being present for the early portions of the writing process.

While the album has since been considered to have a more accessible sound than their previous works, Boyd claimed in 2020 that "we didn’t actually say out loud to each other that we needed to write a more commercial record; we just wrote in the same way we knew how to write and Make Yourself is what came out." However, guitarist Mike Einziger did note in 2020 that the band wanted to make the album more mature and less "zany" than earlier works such as S.C.I.E.N.C.E.. In a 1999 interview from when the album was being written, he further said that it was going to have more "ambiance" and be more focused than S.C.I.E.N.C.E.. In 2020, he stated there was a "genuine creative desire to step up our artistry. We really wanted to become great songwriters [and] graduate from the zany music we spent our high school years writing." Einziger added that, "I really wanted Brandon to be more vulnerable. We had conversations about that; some of them were uncomfortable. I felt like a lot of the music we’d written up until that point was personal but some of it was almost cartoonish, which is awesome and something that came very naturally to us, but I felt like we could really connect with people and write music that could make more of an emotional connection."

Einziger also noted in a 2011 Ultimate Guitar interview that he knew the band's change in direction would potentially alienate fans of their earlier work, which had more of an experimental funk-based sound. He compared the change in sound from S.C.I..E.N.C.E. to Make Yourself to the change in sound from 2006's Light Grenades to 2011's If Not Now, When?, which saw the band temporarily go in a soft adult contemporary direction. In this same interview, he said when they started writing Make Yourself, he felt as though the band had naturally come "to the end of an era" with their music, saying this mirrored how they felt when they started writing If Not Now, When?. He added that on both occasions, he felt like it was time "to do something very different that was going to polarize the people who had been previously listening to us."

Tensions arose between band members during the making of the album, which led to them briefly entering group therapy. Boyd reflected on the tension in a 2001 interview with Spin, saying that "when we're making music together, it's like five men making love — in a very platonic sense. It's very erotic because your spirits are intermingling, you're becoming one. It's also why it can get so heated. You're tapping into this electricity that's very primal."

Regarding his experience writing the album, Boyd remembered in 2020, "when we were touring S.C.I.E.N.C.E, I’d been with my girlfriend for quite a long time, and then it came to light that she’d been having an affair while I was gone, so I was dealing with a pretty high degree of heartbreak when I went into Make Yourself. The writing process ended up becoming like an open poetic therapy session for me. There was a little bit of anger, definitely heartbreak but also a sense of hope around finding a new love. From my point of view, the songs very clearly describe the arc of that experience." Prior to discovering the affair, Boyd had been dating this woman since 1991, which was the same year that Incubus formed. In a 2000 interview, Boyd said that when "Pardon Me" was written, he was also dealing with the deaths of a family member and a friend, in addition to these relationship troubles. He said that he was "being bombarded by life" at the time, and that this inspired the song's lyrical themes. The lyrics to "Stellar" were inspired by Boyd's new girlfriend Jo, who he met during the making of the album. She would later appear in the song's music video, with Boyd saying in 2020, "it was a very different kind of love than the love I experienced as a teenager. It felt much more expansive, hence the 'meet me in outer space' imagery." Boyd wrote the melodies to the song after Einziger showed him the main guitar part for it.

Regarding the hit single "Drive", Boyd said "a lot of those topics are still things I wrestle with. The song is about reckoning with fear and uncertainty and I’m still in a kind-of active dance with that, as I probably will be my entire life", adding that "just because you write something down, put a melody to it and a bunch of people like it doesn’t mean it was a thought that was complete – it’s not as if I became enlightened around the idea of not letting fear dictate the course of my life." Einziger said, "I could never have predicted [Drive] was going to be a smash-hit song, but I knew that it felt special to us. It felt like an honest encapsulation of being vulnerable and I felt like people would connect with it." Before recording the final version that appears on the album, the band worked on a demo version of the song at their homes which closely resembled the final version, with Einziger saying, "I remember [Brandon] singing the lyrics to me in the car as they appear on the album. The version we made before we recorded it properly was really the same."

When the album was being recorded at NRG in North Hollywood, Chris Kilmore had his own DJ setup in the hallway. He adds, "there were a bunch of other bands there. 311 was there a lot of the time, and Jurassic 5 was there a lot of the time. And because I had that turntable setup in the hallway, I was always out there practicing and trying stuff." The day the instrumental song "Battlestar Scralatchtica" was recorded, Brandon Boyd was missing because he had a dentist appointment. Kilmore states, "we weren’t going to waste a day. So we wrote a cool little track. I was out in the hallway scratching, and Nu-Mark and Cut Chemist walked by. I was like, 'Hey. Do you guys want to scratch on this track we just did?'. We went in, laid it down, and that’s how 'Battlestar Scralatchtica' came about." Around the time the record was being made, Kilmore also contributed DJ scratches to the album Introduction to Mayhem, by the nu metal band Primer 55.

== Composition ==
Make Yourself has been labelled as an alternative metal, nu metal, alternative rock, and funk rock album. Slant Magazine claimed in 2001 that Incubus "blur the perceptions between metal and alt-rock" on the album. It has also been described as having more ambient tones than their previous work. In a 2000 interview, singer Brandon Boyd said that the band weren't concerned about whether the album was going to fit into any particular music scene; regardless, one critic remarked that the album's music had targeted mainstream trends, blending funk rock inspired by Red Hot Chili Peppers with alternative metal, whereas S.C.I.E.N.C.E. "sometimes veered abruptly between the two genres without really fusing them".

== Touring ==
To support Make Yourself, the band and Buckethead opened for Primus on their Antipop tour in 1999, including at a millennium show on December 31, 1999. Early the following year, they performed at the SnoCore Tour with System of a Down and Mr. Bungle (who broke up shortly afterwards). The members of Incubus have since spoken of their pleasure at getting to play with Primus and Mr. Bungle, two artists whom they cite as influences. Mr. Bungle were met with a hostile crowd reception at some of the shows with Incubus and System of a Down. Mr. Bungle's bassist Trevor Dunn remarked in 2013 that "we were sort of the grandpas of the tour", adding that his band dressed up as the Village People at these shows in an attempt to anger the "metal kids" in the audience. Brandon Boyd later reflected in 2018, "Mr. Bungle was hugely influential to both of our bands, and they were playing second, like before Incubus and System of a Down." He added, "Mike Patton would be a real rabble rouser, and say horrible things to the audience. We would be on the side of stage cheering, fanboys."

Following this, Incubus went on an American tour with 311, which lasted from late April 2000 to the beginning of July 2000. From August to early September 2000, the band performed at that year's edition of Ozzfest. It was their second appearance at the festival, having earlier appeared at the 1998 edition. On October 12, 2000, the band performed the single "Stellar" on the Late Show with David Letterman. They had also performed the song on an August 2, 2000 episode of the Late Late Show with Craig Kilborn. Between October and November 2000, Incubus and Taproot supported Deftones on their "Back to School" tour for the album White Pony.

== Release and commercial response ==
Shortly after the album's release, a death metal band from Louisiana called Incubus changed their name. Now known as Opprobrium, they had released two critically acclaimed albums in 1988 and 1990, titled Serpent Temptation and Beyond the Unknown, and were not aware of the Californian Incubus prior to the release of Make Yourself. The name change was voluntarily made in order to avoid confusion and any potential conflicts between the two bands. Serpent Temptation and Beyond the Unknown were sometimes incorrectly labelled as being early releases from the Californian Incubus, and Opprobrium eventually reissued these albums under their new name. A British hard rock/heavy metal band called Incubus had also released an album in 1984 titled To the Devil a Daughter, which was sometimes attributed to the Californian Incubus.

The first single "Pardon Me" was initially released to radio stations as an acoustic song, which led to the album version becoming popular as well. According to Boyd, it was Epic/Immortal Records that suggested "Pardon Me" be released as a single, telling MTV in 2000 that "we wrote 'Pardon Me' along with the whole album and never thought anything different about it." In August 2000, an EP titled When Incubus Attacks Volume 1 was released, featuring the acoustic version of "Pardon Me" and acoustic versions of the songs "Make Yourself" and "Stellar". The three acoustic versions of these songs originated from a November 1999 recording session in Chicago. The EP also featured additional material, including the song "Crowded Elevator", which was recorded during the Make Yourself sessions. "Crowded Elevator" had earlier appeared on the soundtrack album for the horror film Scream 3, which was released in January 2000.

By the time Make Yourself's final and most popular single "Drive" was released in November 2000, the band had already sold a million copies, with Einziger recalling in 2020 that, "'Pardon Me' was a big deal for us, 'Stellar' was the second song that came out and a big deal on MTV, and then when 'Drive' came out it really pushed everything over the top." "Drive" managed to garner substantial airplay on non-rock stations, and in a 2001 Billboard interview, Boyd said that this fit with their philosophy of not creating music for any one particular group. Regarding their success around this time, Boyd remembered in 2020, "the most stark change was that all of a sudden women were coming to our concerts so when people would cheer after a song, the pitch went up considerably."

In 1999 and 2000, music videos were made for "Pardon Me", "Stellar" and "Drive". Less widely seen music videos were also made for the non-singles "I Miss You", "Privilege" and "Out from Under". The video for "Out from Under" was originally meant to be released as part of the 2001 When Incubus Attacks Volume 2 DVD, although it was not included as there was not enough space left on the disc. A tour edition for the album was released in 2001, with a second disc containing the three acoustic tracks and one live track.

== Reception ==
Professional ratings
Review scores
Source	Rating
AllMusic	4/5 stars
Alternative Press	3/5
The Daily Vault	A−
The Encyclopedia of Popular Music	4/5 stars
The Rolling Stone Album Guide	4/5 stars
Slant Magazine	4/5 stars
Sputnikmusic	4/5

Make Yourself has received generally positive reviews from critics. Steve Huey of AllMusic praised the band for "settling more comfortably into its sound" in an attempt to blend into the mainstream, and though it "resulted in a few awkward moments and underwritten songs", he expected it to be popular among fans of the band and their peers.

Sal Cinquemani of Slant Magazine also gave it four out of five stars, writing in April 2001, "whether it’s rehashed hard rock or a non-enterprising rap-metal hybrid, there isn’t much to differentiate between most rock bands these days. Incubus, however, sets themselves apart with their second full-length release Make Yourself. A superb blend of metal guitar riffs, classic punk-rock mentality, and subtle hip hop and electronic elements, Incubus doesn’t just imitate these genres, but rather, redefines them in an otherwise non-revolutionary rock landscape." The New Rolling Stone Album Guide (2004) states that on Make Yourself, "Incubus had found a beta-male approach to new-metal: roaring, asymmetrical riffs and herky-jerky dynamics coexisting with Boyd's yearning tenor and burgeoning melodic gift." In November 1999, Tulane Hullabaloo writer Henry Rienka claimed that it was a rap rock album in the style of bands such as Hed PE, despite consisting entirely of sung vocals. Rienka wrote that, "their union of grinding guitar, vinyl scratching, and urgent rock/rap vocals produces thrashing, grooving, and bouncing boobies." He added, "Make Yourself just doesn't quite match up with their breakthrough release; 1997's S.C.I.E.N.C.E.. On this effort, Incubus seems more concerned with playing with sounds and differentiating themselves from Kid Rock than they do with making enjoyable music."

Kevin Stewart-Panko of Canadian publication Exclaim! gave Make Yourself a positive review in December 1999, writing "Incubus is simply an awesome band. They have the distorted guitars, but they also have finger wagging melodies, an actual singer and dance floor elements. It’s similar stuff that plagued Faith No More about ten years ago, and Incubus has a noticeable FNM influence, especially Brandon Boyd's voice, which eerily recalls a youthful Mike Patton." In their November 1999 review, CMJ New Music Report also compared the album's vocals to Faith No More, and described the instrumentation as being a cross between the funk style of Primus and the "bloody new metal riffs" of Korn. They added that it is a "step away from the spastic, funkdafied metal of 1997's brilliant S.C.I.E.N.C.E. [but] definitely not a step down in quality." Adweek stated in April 2000 that Incubus had "finally made a mark", and that "their newest offering blends alternative metal with a little rap/rock thrown in for good measure." The Michigan Daily had a negative view of the band's new sound, giving the album only one out of five stars in October 1999. The review states that, "the group's once potent mix of funk, metal, hip-hop, soul and R&B was initially compared to 'Primus with a soul singer' and a '90s Red Hot Chili Peppers'. With the bland, radio friendly offering Make Yourself, it looks like Incubus is more likely to get compared to the likes of The Goo Goo Dolls and Sugar Ray." In December 1999, Daily Eastern News writer Al Dertz criticized the album for having less slap bass playing from Alex Katunich, adding that Incubus "once had equal influences of Faith No More, Primus and Rage Against the Machine brilliance" and have now "fallen into 311 mediocrity."

Make Yourself was also met with a mixed reaction from some fans of the band, due to its different sound. In a June 2000 interview with Spin, Brandon Boyd claimed, "when the album first came out, we got threatening letters from fans like 'You Sold Out'."

=== Legacy and accolades ===
The album is listed in the 2005 book 1001 Albums You Must Hear Before You Die. Colin Larkin wrote in his 2011 book The Encyclopedia of Popular Music that Make Yourself was "a far slicker affair than previous outings", adding that it "utilized the latest studio technology and a greater range of sounds." In 2019, Kerrang! included it on a list titled "50 Rock and Metal Bands Whose Third Album Was Their Best". They wrote, "in ways moving away from their roots and definitively getting more anthemic and catchier with it, Make Yourself caught Incubus in a state of flux, but one in which they really found their feet. A little nu metal, a little alternative metal, a little funk, but altogether compelling." Loudwire praised it in 2019, stating that "while at first the album appears to be more of a mainstream break for the band, with Make Yourself they’ve managed to find a smoother way to incorporate hip-hop and funk more consistently into their brand of alternative metal", adding "it may not be the most heavy on the nu-metal sound because of this, but it allowed the mainstream to get a taste of something they may otherwise not have been looking for."

PopMatters included it on their 2020 list of "The Most Memorable Albums of 1999", with writer Theresa Dougherty remarking that they "became one of the first bands played on modern rock radio to effectively integrate a DJ into their sound." In 2021, it was named one of the 20 best metal albums of 1999 by Metal Hammer magazine. In a 2022 Louder Sound article, Brandon Boyd placed it fourth in his ranking of their studio albums. He stated, "It's not higher because it was a period of time that was gruelling. We were playing 9 or 10 shows a week: one in the morning and one in the evening, I learned to take naps on drum risers during soundchecks." Boyd also reflected in 2020 that, "all of the flags were blowing in a direction that was telling us we should’ve made another record like S.C.I.E.N.C.E. and that would’ve solidified our place in a small subgenre of rock and metal", adding "our intuitions were pulling us in a completely different direction and we trusted it. We ended up carving our own place in the world." In 2023, Alternative Press placed it third in their ranking of the band's studio albums. In 2025, Rae Lemeshow-Barooshian of Loudwire included the album in her list of "the top 50 nu-metal albums of all time", ranking it twelfth.

== Live performance ==
The first known performance of a Make Yourself song was at a March 4, 1999 concert at the Glass House in Pomona, California, which featured the live debut of "Nowhere Fast". All of the other songs from Make Yourself were performed live during the touring cycle in 1999 and 2000, with the exception of "Battlestar Scralatchtica", which is not known to have been performed until 2001 during the Morning View touring cycle. The band went on a tour of North America in 2019 to celebrate the album's 20th anniversary. In a 2019 interview, DJ Chris Kilmore stated, "for me personally, I actually really enjoy revisiting Make Yourself because my role in the band has expanded greatly into playing all kinds of keyboards and things like that. But when we were on Make Yourself, I just had two turntables. So I really get to showcase what I originally did in this band, which is really fun for me."

== Track listing ==
=== Original release ===
All tracks are written by Brandon Boyd, Michael Einziger, Alex Katunich, Chris Kilmore and Jose Pasillas.

Make Yourself track listing
No.	Title	Length
1.	"Privilege"	3:54
2.	"Nowhere Fast"	4:30
3.	"Consequence"	3:18
4.	"The Warmth"	4:24
5.	"When It Comes"	4:00
6.	"Stellar"	3:20
7.	"Make Yourself"	3:03
8.	"Drive"	3:52
9.	"Clean"	3:55
10.	"Battlestar Scralatchtica" (Instrumental)	3:49
11.	"I Miss You"	2:48
12.	"Pardon Me"	3:43
13.	"Out from Under"	3:28
Total length:		48:04

Japanese edition bonus track
No.	Title	Length
14.	"Crowded Elevator"	4:46
Total length:		52:58

=== Tour edition bonus disc ===
No.	Title	Length
1.	"Pardon Me" (acoustic)	3:47
2.	"Stellar" (acoustic)	3:16
3.	"Make Yourself" (acoustic)	3:13
4.	"Drive" (live orchestral version)	4:04

== Personnel ==
Credits adapted from the album's liner notes.

Incubus

- Brandon Boyd – vocals, percussion
- Mike Einziger – guitar
- DJ Kilmore – turntables
- Dirk Lance – bass
- Jose Pasillas – drums

Additional personnel

- Dave Holdridge – cello on "Drive", "I Miss You", digital editing
- Cut Chemist – additional scratching on "Battlestar Scralatchtica"
- DJ Nu-Mark – additional scratching on "Battlestar Scralatchtica"
- Michael Baskette – engineer
- Evan Hollander – assisting engineer
- Matt Griffin – assisting engineer
- Stephen Marcussen — mastering at A&M
- Rick Will – mixing
- Scott Litt – mixing

== Charts ==
=== Weekly charts ===
Weekly chart performance for Make Yourself
Chart (1999–2001)	Peak position
Australian Albums (ARIA)	24
Austrian Albums (Ö3 Austria)	30
German Albums (Offizielle Top 100)	56
New Zealand Albums (RMNZ)	8
Scottish Albums (Official Charts)	59
Swiss Albums (Schweizer Hitparade)	45
UK Albums (Official Charts)	83
US Billboard 200	47

=== Year-end charts ===
2000 year-end chart performance for Make Yourself
Chart (2000)	Position
US Billboard 200	107

2001 year-end chart performance for Make Yourself
Chart (2001)	Position
Canadian Albums (Nielsen SoundScan)	166
US Billboard 200	90

2002 year-end chart performance for Make Yourself
Chart (2002)	Position
Canadian Alternative Albums (Nielsen SoundScan)	151
Canadian Metal Albums (Nielsen SoundScan)	75

== Certifications ==
Certifications for Make Yourself
Region	Certification	Certified units/sales
Australia (ARIA)	Gold	35,000^{^}
Canada (Music Canada)	Platinum	100,000^{^}
New Zealand (RMNZ)	Platinum	15,000^{^}
United Kingdom (BPI)	Gold	100,000^{*}
United States (RIAA)	2× Platinum	2,000,000^{^}
^{*} Sales figures based on certification alone.^{^} Shipments figures based on certification alone.
