= Enjoy Incubus =

EP by Incubus
- Released: January 7, 1997
- Studio: 4th Street Recording (Santa Monica, California)
- Genre: Funk metal; alternative metal; nu metal
- Length: 38:38
- Label: Epic; Immortal
- Producer: Jim Wirt

Incubus chronology
Fungus Amongus (1995)	Enjoy Incubus (1997)	S.C.I.E.N.C.E. (1997)

Enjoy Incubus is the second EP and major label debut by American rock band Incubus. It was released on January 7, 1997, by Epic and Immortal Records. It contained re-recordings of songs that were featured on their previous, independent releases Let Me Tell Ya 'Bout Root Beer and Fungus Amongus, as well the previously unreleased song "Version" and an untitled hidden track at the end of "Hilikus". It was the first appearance on a release by Gavin Koppel, who added turntable scratches to the Fungus Amongus songs, and also supplied saxophone samples.

== Background ==
Enjoy Incubus marked the beginning of the band's career with Sony's Epic/Immortal label, who signed them to a seven-record contract in 1996. The EP's turntablist Gavin Koppell joined the band in late 1995. He had seen Incubus play live and asked if they would be interested in using some of his hip-hop tracks; Lyfe eventually became a full-time member after just one rehearsal. Brandon Boyd's singing ability, combined with the band's high-energy shows and growing fan base, was what caught the interest of Epic/Immortal.

The EP was released in the US and other countries in January 1997, with the label's strategy being to build the band's fanbase through touring rather than radio airplay. Incubus subsequently went on a tour of Europe in early 1997, where they were joined by Korn and alternative rock band The Urge. Both Korn and The Urge were Epic/Immortal labelmates of Incubus at that time. The tour would end up being a success, helping expose Incubus to a wider audience. Korn were supporting their Life Is Peachy album, and live performances from them and the two other bands would be included on a promotional Life Is Peachy tour sampler. The tour sampler came as a bonus CD on some editions of Life Is Peachy, and the live Incubus track which was included was "Hilikus". The final show of the tour was in front of more than 5,000 people in Paris. In 1997, Boyd reflected "we had never played in front of a crowd that big, and the response we got far exceeded any response we've ever gotten. To play in front of a crowd that has no idea who you are, and then you start playing and they understand the energy of it and start freaking out, it's quite an experience."

== Reception ==
Professional ratings
Review scores
Source	Rating
AllMusic	4/5 stars
Ultimate Guitar	9.4/10

In early 1999, Enjoy Incubus and the band's full-length major label debut S.C.I.E.N.C.E. were estimated to have sold a combined total of 200,000 units. The 2003 book The Rough Guide to Rock states that Enjoy Incubus "showcased a band with a singer whose vocal style came uncomfortably close to that of Faith No More crooner Mike Patton and a guitarist keen to make like the Chili Peppers' John Frusciante." In October 2001, Sean Richardson of The Phoenix had a mixed view of the EP, writing "back then, they were considered a cheap 311 knockoff with a singer who did a decent impersonation of former Faith No More frontman Mike Patton — not the most auspicious way to begin a career in rock."

== Track listing ==
No.	Title	Length
1.	"You Will Be a Hot Dancer"	4:16
2.	"Shaft!"	3:25
3.	"Take Me to Your Leader"	4:43
4.	"Version"	4:17
5.	"Azwethinkweiz"	3:48
6.	"Hilikus"	18:09
Total length:		38:38

Notes

- "Hilikus" ends at 3:57. An untitled hidden track (often referred to as "Hidden Bonus") starts at 13:59, after ten minutes and two seconds of silence. On streaming, it is listed as a separate seventh track.
- Exactly 3:40 into "Azwethinkweiz", a hidden message of Boyd saying something backwards can be heard: "Thursday night, we smoked indica, and 'azwethinkweizm' was born." (see backmasking).

== Personnel ==
Incubus

- Brandon Boyd – vocals, percussion
- Mike Einziger – guitars
- Gavin Koppel – scratches
- Alex Katunich – bass
- José Pasillas – drums

Technical personnel

- Jim Wirt – producer, engineer, mixing
- Eddy Schreyer – mastering
