= Pardon Me =

Single by Incubus

from the album Make Yourself
- B-side: "Crowded Elevator"
- Released: October 5, 1999
- Studio: NRG (Los Angeles)
- Genre: Alternative metal; nu metal; post-grunge
- Length: 3:44
- Label: Epic; Immortal
- Songwriter: Incubus
- Producer: Scott Litt

Incubus singles chronology
| "New Skin" (1998) | "Pardon Me" (1999) | "Stellar" (2000) |

Music video
- "Pardon Me" on YouTube

"Pardon Me" is a song by American rock band Incubus. Released on October 5, 1999, as the lead single from their third studio album Make Yourself, it was the band's first song to receive considerable radio airplay, reaching number three on the Billboard Modern Rock Tracks chart, number seven on the Mainstream Rock Tracks chart and number two on Bubbling Under Hot 100 Singles chart.

In 2024, the staff of Consequence included the song in their list of "50 Kick-Butt Post-Grunge Songs We Can Get Behind".

== Background and writing ==
In an interview, lead singer Brandon Boyd explained the song's origins, "I was in a bookstore, browsing through an old Life magazine, when I saw a picture of what the article called spontaneous human combustion. There were an old guy's legs and shoes, perfectly intact - then, right around his knee area, was just a pile of charred ashes. I was going through some turmoil in my life, both good and bad, and the image struck a chord, so I wrote a song about it." Boyd had recently returned from a tour to find out that his girlfriend of 7 years broke up with him, and that both his grandmother and a close friend of his had died. After seeing a picture in Life magazine of a man who had spontaneously combusted, he related the man's problems to his own.

== Music video ==
The music video for "Pardon Me", directed by Steven Murashige, also gained considerable airplay. The video begins with Brandon Boyd and his father Charles, at opposite ends of a hallway. As the two approach each other, Charles begins to regress in age and appearance, while Boyd begins to grow more elderly, becoming increasingly alike as they advance toward each other. When they meet, they pass through each other and continue on in opposite directions. Footage of the band members in white outfits (except for Boyd, who is shirtless) in a red-colored box are also shown, as is footage of the band members in red outfits being surrounded by businessmen and businesswomen.

The video premiered on The Box the week ending on January 16, 2000.

== Track listing ==
US single

1. "Pardon Me" (Album Version)
2. "Crowded Elevator"
3. "Pardon Me" (Acoustic)
4. "Drive" (Acoustic)

US promotional single

1. "Pardon Me" (Acoustic)

UK single

1. "Pardon Me" (Album Version)
2. "I Miss You" (Acoustic)
3. "Crowded Elevator"

== Personnel ==
Incubus

- Brandon Boyd – vocals
- Mike Einziger – guitar
- Dirk Lance – bass
- Chris Kilmore – turntables
- José Pasillas – drums

Production

- Produced by Scott Litt

== Charts ==
=== Weekly charts ===
Weekly chart performance for "Pardon Me"
| Chart (2000) | Peak position |
|---|---|
| Scottish Singles Sales (Official Charts) | 86 |
| UK Singles (Official Charts) | 61 |
| US Bubbling Under Hot 100 (Billboard) | 2 |
| US Alternative Airplay (Billboard) | 3 |
| US Mainstream Rock Airplay (Billboard) | 7 |

=== Year-end charts ===
Year-end chart performance for "Pardon Me"
| Chart (2000) | Position |
|---|---|
| US Mainstream Rock Tracks (Billboard) | 19 |
| US Modern Rock Tracks (Billboard) | 3 |

== Certifications ==
Certifications and sales for "Pardon Me"
| Region | Certification | Certified units/sales |
|---|---|---|
| New Zealand (RMNZ) | Platinum | 30,000^{‡} |
^{‡} Sales+streaming figures based on certification alone.

== Release history ==
Release dates and formats for "Pardon Me"
| Region | Date | Format(s) | Label(s) | Ref. |
|---|---|---|---|---|
| United States | October 5, 1999 | Alternative radio | Epic; Immortal | |
| United Kingdom | May 8, 2000 | 7-inch vinyl; CD | Epic | |
