= Stellar (song) =

Single by Incubus

from the album Make Yourself
- Released: June 13, 2000
- Studio: NRG (Los Angeles)
- Length: 3:20
- Label: Epic; Immortal
- Songwriter: Incubus
- Producer: Scott Litt

Incubus singles chronology
"Pardon Me" (1999)	"Stellar" (2000)	"Drive" (2000)

Music video
- "Stellar" on YouTube

"Stellar" is a song by American rock band Incubus. It was released on June 13, 2000, as the second single from their third album Make Yourself. The song reached number two on the US Billboard Modern Rock Tracks and also reached number 17 on the Billboard Mainstream Rock Tracks chart as well as number seven on the Billboard Bubbling Under Hot 100 Singles chart.

== Music video ==
The music video, released in 2000, has the band playing in a surreal, celestial atmosphere. A young woman (played by Brandon Boyd's then-girlfriend Jo) ends up traveling into space to meet Boyd. During the chorus, the band is seen playing in front of a white screen with floating lines and graphs spinning around in the background.

== Personnel ==
Incubus

- Brandon Boyd – vocals
- Mike Einziger – guitar
- Dirk Lance – bass
- José Pasillas – drums
- Chris Kilmore – turntables

Production

- Produced by Scott Litt

== Charts ==
Weekly chart performance for "Stellar"
Chart (2000)	Peak position
US Bubbling Under Hot 100 (Billboard)	7
US Alternative Airplay (Billboard)	2
US Mainstream Rock (Billboard)	17
