= Brandon Boyd =

American musician (born 1976)

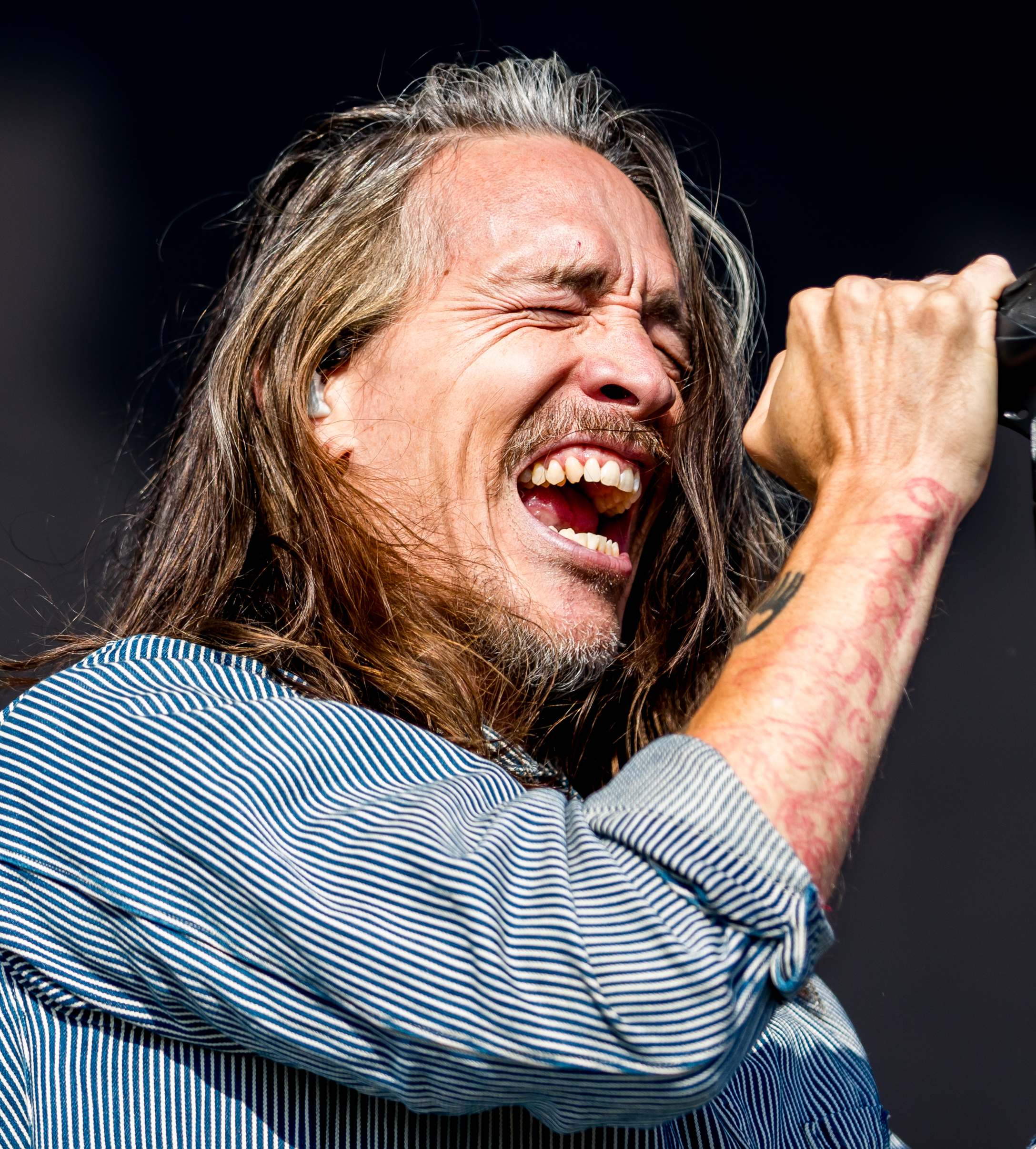
- Boyd performing with Incubus in 2023

Background information
- Also known as: The Invisible Floating Torso Man (Make Yourself); Happy Knappy (Fungus Amongus); Brandon of the Jungle (Enjoy Incubus); Cornelius (S.C.I.E.N.C.E.)
- Born: Brandon Charles Boyd; February 15, 1976 (age 50); Van Nuys, California, U.S.
- Genres: Alternative rock; indie rock; alternative metal; funk rock; nu metal; funk metal
- Occupations: Singer; musician; songwriter
- Years active: 1990–present
- Member of: Incubus

Brandon Charles Boyd (born February 15, 1976) is an American musician, best known as the lead vocalist of the rock band Incubus, with whom he has recorded eight studio albums.

In addition to his work with Incubus, Boyd has released two solo albums – The Wild Trapeze (2010), and Echoes & Cocoons (2022) – and has collaborated with producer Brendan O'Brien under the name Sons of the Sea.

== Early life ==
Boyd graduated from Calabasas High School in 1994 and attended Moorpark College for two years before committing to Incubus. Boyd grew up in Calabasas, California with Ricky Taylor who inspired him to write music. His parents, Priscilla "Dolly" Wiseman and Charles Boyd, both of whom had experience in entertainment, with his father being a former Marlboro Man, had nurtured his artistic side since he was a child.

Boyd broke his nose twice; once getting an Easter egg to the face, and the other from being hit in the face with Dirk Lance's bass during a show. He opted to let the injuries heal on their own, but they only worsened his breathing the older he became. He claims to have sung and breathed from one nostril up until having surgery to fix the issue in December 2019.

== Career ==
=== Incubus ===
Boyd designed concert fliers that advertised Incubus' early performances. He occasionally plays guitar during live performances and brings other instruments into his songs, such as the didgeridoo and djembe.

Boyd's voice was part of what enticed Sony's Epic/Immortal Records, along with the self-released album Fungus Amongus. The band was signed in 1996. Boyd's singing style in Incubus has often been compared to Mike Patton, vocalist of Faith No More and several other projects. Boyd has mentioned Patton as being an influence since he was an early teenager. Incubus' first two releases on the label, Enjoy Incubus and S.C.I.E.N.C.E. went largely unnoticed in the mainstream but subsequent releases Make Yourself and Morning View were commercial successes. Boyd attracted a large number of female fans. In a 2001 interview, Spin wrote "Considering his androgynous beauty and sweet demeanor, plus Incubus' kid-tested/mother-approved guitar rock, it's no surprise he's MTV's newest weapon of mass heartbreak. Girls scream for him to take his shirt off at Incubus shows (he usually obliges) and Teen People voted him one of 'The Hottest Guys in Music.' His sensitive-guy appeal sets him apart from today's testosterone-drunk rock". The band's 2004 release A Crow Left of the Murder... was nominated for Best Hard Rock Performance in the 2005 Grammy Awards. On November 28, 2006, the band released Light Grenades. In June 2009, Incubus released a greatest hits album, Monuments and Melodies.

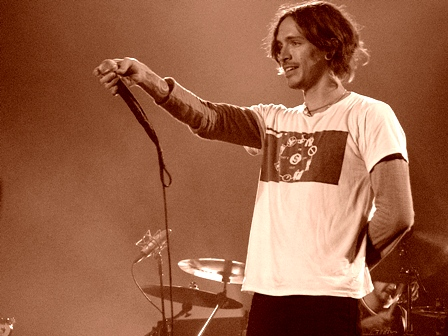
Boyd performing in 2004

In 2011, Incubus finished their seventh studio album If Not Now, When?, released on July 12, 2011, followed by a tour. It was their final release under Sony.

On December 13, 2014, they performed their single entitled "Trust Fall" at KROQ. They announced the release of two EPs in 2015 with the first, Trust Fall, released on March 24, 2015, through Island Records. On February 5, 2015, the single "Absolution Calling" was released. Two years later, in February 2017, Boyd and Incubus worked with Skrillex on a collaboration that was released under the title "8" in April 2017.

=== Literature and fine art ===
Boyd had been drawing his entire life. Between 2003 and 2008 he focused more on creating fine art, specifically painting. He participated in different group and solo art shows, using his artwork as a means for environmental activism. September 8, 2008, marked the opening of his first solo show, Ectoplasm, at Mr. Musichead Gallery in Los Angeles, California.

In March 2020, Boyd had planned to debut a new large-scale solo exhibit, Impossible Knots, at the Samuel Lynne Galleries in Dallas, Texas. Due to the COVID-19 pandemic, the in-person exhibit had to be postponed. On April 18, 2020, his work debuted online via a virtual exhibition preview on Instagram. This online debut will be followed by the in-person exhibition in Fall 2020 or Spring 2021.

Boyd released a card-matching game called Two Doors/Deux Portes, based on a series of his watercolor paintings.

Boyd has written and curated three books, each of which comprise his personal illustrations, photography, song lyrics, and additional thoughts and writings. His books are White Fluffy Clouds (2003), From the Murks of the Sultry Abyss (2007), and So the Echo (2013), all published under his book imprint, Endophasia Publications.

=== Solo career ===
On July 6, 2010, Boyd announced that his debut solo album, The Wild Trapeze was released. On June 21, 2010, a music video for Boyd's first single from The Wild Trapeze, "Runaway Train", was released. A second music video was released for the album, for the song "Last Night a Passenger" in October 2010.

On January 18, 2013, Boyd announced his band, Sons of the Sea. With Incubus on hiatus, Sons of the Sea toured in 2013 and 2014. On May 29, 2013, Boyd released a teaser video announcing the name of the album, Sons of the Sea. That same year, he embarked on a book-signing tour of the Northeast to coincide with his latest publication 'So The Echo, as well as the release of Sons of the Sea's eponymous record.

On March 11, 2022, Boyd released Echoes & Cocoons, produced by John Congleton.

In 2022 and 2023, Boyd appeared as White Jesus in seasons 2 and 3 of the series Reservation Dogs.

In February 2024, he was featured on the Night Verses's single "Glitching Prisms".

== Personal life ==
In the spring of 2011, Boyd made a large mural at the Hurley Space Gallery in order to raise awareness about single use plastics and their harmful effects on the world's oceans. Boyd is involved with many organizations and charitable causes and in 2003, along with his Incubus bandmates, he founded the 501(c)(3) non-profit The Make Yourself Foundation, which has raised over $1.4 million for various philanthropic causes locally and globally. The organization has awarded grant funding to over 60 nonprofit organizations.

In a 2024 Rolling Stone interview, Boyd stated that his wife, former ballerina Sarah Hay, is a fan of Lizzo. Lizzo would later join Incubus for a performance of “Aqueous Transmission" at the Hollywood Bowl.

== Discography ==
With Incubus

- Fungus Amongus (1995)
- Enjoy Incubus (EP) (1997)
- S.C.I.E.N.C.E. (1997)
- Make Yourself (1999)
- Morning View (2001)
- A Crow Left of the Murder... (2004)
- Light Grenades (2006)
- Monuments and Melodies (2009)
- If Not Now, When? (2011)
- Trust Fall (Side A) (EP) (2015)
- 8 (2017)
- Trust Fall (Side B) (EP) (2020)

Solo

- The Wild Trapeze (2010)
- Echoes & Cocoons (2022)

With Sons of the Sea

- Compass (EP) (2013)
- Sons of the Sea (2013)

Guest Appearances

- Strait Up – Snot (2000)
- Leave on Your Makeup – Ben Kenney (2013)
- Glitching Prisms – Night Verses (2024)
