= Myles Kennedy discography =

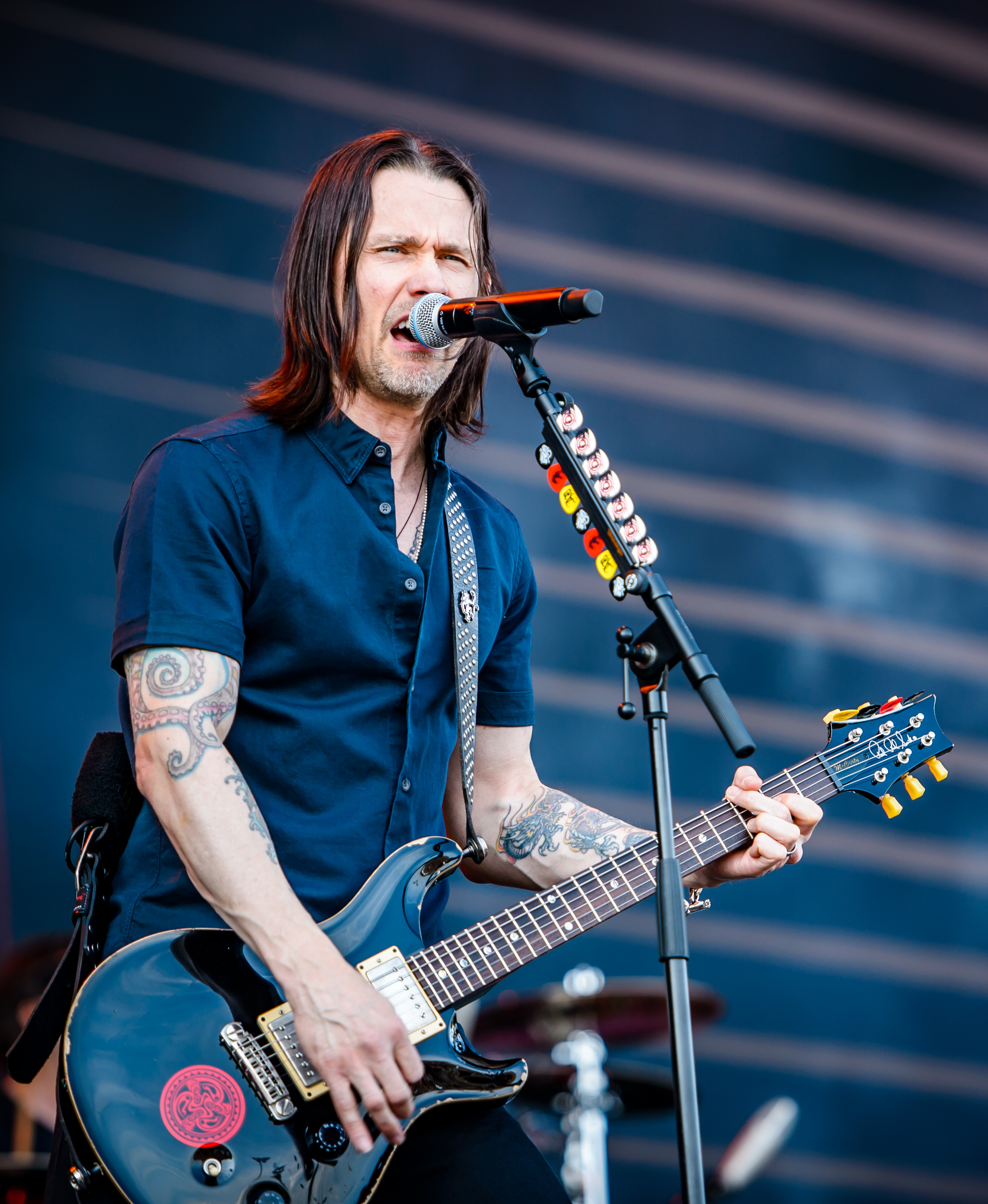
- Kennedy in 2017
- Studio albums: 15
- Extended plays: 5
- Live albums: 7
- Singles: 13
- Video albums: 5

The full discography of American rock musician Myles Kennedy consists of eighteen studio albums, two concert films, four live albums, five extended plays, and thirteen singles in total, in addition to eleven studio tracks that he has appeared on as a featured artist, one of which was a single. Born in Boston on November 27, 1969, Kennedy is currently a member of the rock band Alter Bridge, with whom he has released seven studio albums, two concert films, and several singles. He is also the frontman of Slash's touring group, and with Slash he has released a live album, Live in Manchester, the first of a series of live albums released throughout the summer of 2010, and Made in Stoke: 24/7/11, another live album released in 2011. In 2012, he released a collaboration studio album with Slash titled Apocalyptic Love, which is billed to Slash featuring Myles Kennedy and the Conspirators, as well as the 2014 follow-up titled World on Fire. With the Mayfield Four, he released two studio albums, two extended plays, and four singles; with Citizen Swing, two studio albums; and with Cosmic Dust, one studio album. He has also released two solo albums.

== Albums ==
=== Studio albums ===
Year	Artist	Album
1991	Cosmic Dust	Journey
1993	Citizen Swing	Cure Me with the Groove
1995	Citizen Swing	Deep Down
1998	The Mayfield Four	Fallout
2001	The Mayfield Four	Second Skin
2004	Alter Bridge	One Day Remains
2007	Alter Bridge	Blackbird
2010	Alter Bridge	AB III
2012	Slash featuring Myles Kennedy and the Conspirators	Apocalyptic Love
2013	Alter Bridge	Fortress
2014	Slash featuring Myles Kennedy and the Conspirators	World on Fire
2016	Alter Bridge	The Last Hero
2018	Myles Kennedy	Year of the Tiger
2018	Slash featuring Myles Kennedy and the Conspirators	Living the Dream
2019	Alter Bridge	Walk the Sky
2021	Myles Kennedy	The Ides of March
2022	Slash featuring Myles Kennedy and the Conspirators	4
2022	Alter Bridge	Pawns & Kings
2024	Myles Kennedy	The Art of Letting Go
2026	Alter Bridge	Alter Bridge
2027	Slash featuring Myles Kennedy and the Conspirators	Flying Blind

=== Live albums ===
Year	Artist	Album
2010	Slash featuring Myles Kennedy and the Conspirators	Live in Manchester
2009	Alter Bridge	Live from Amsterdam
2011	Slash featuring Myles Kennedy and the Conspirators	Made in Stoke: 24/7/11
2012	Alter Bridge	Live at Wembley
2015	Slash featuring Myles Kennedy and the Conspirators	Live at the Roxy 9.25.14
2017	Alter Bridge	Live at the O2 Arena
2018	Alter Bridge	Live at the Royal Albert Hall
2019	Slash featuring Myles Kennedy and the Conspirators	Living the Dream Tour

== Extended plays ==
Year	Artist	Album
1996	The Mayfield Four	Thirty Two Point Five Hours
1997	The Mayfield Four	Motion
2005	Alter Bridge	Fan EP
2011	Slash featuring Myles Kennedy and the Conspirators	iTunes Session
2014	Slash featuring Myles Kennedy and the Conspirators	Spotify Sessions
2020	Alter Bridge	Walk The Sky 2.0

== Concert films ==
Year	Artist	Album
2009	Alter Bridge	Live from Amsterdam
2011	Slash featuring Myles Kennedy and the Conspirators	Made in Stoke: 24/7/11
2012	Alter Bridge	Live at Wembley
2015	Slash featuring Myles Kennedy and the Conspirators	Live at the Roxy 9.25.14
2018	Alter Bridge	Live at the Royal Albert Hall
2019	Slash featuring Myles Kennedy and the Conspirators	Living the Dream Tour

== Singles ==
Title	Year	Peak chart positions	Album
Title	Year	US Main.	Album
"Year of the Tiger"	2017	23	Year of the Tiger
"In Stride"	2021	25	The Ides of March
"Say What You Will"	2024	15	The Art of Letting Go

=== Promotional singles ===
Title	Year	Album
"Love Can Only Heal"	2018	Year of the Tiger
"Haunted By Design"	2018	Year of the Tiger
"The Ides of March"	2021	The Ides of March
"Get Along"	2021	The Ides of March
"Love Rain Down"	2021	The Ides of March
"Nothing More to Gain"	2024	The Art of Letting Go
"Miss You When You're Gone"	2024	The Art of Letting Go
"Saving Face"	2024	The Art of Letting Go

=== Music videos ===
List of music videos, showing year released, album and director(s)
Title	Year	Director(s)	Album
"Year of the Tiger"	2017	Dan Sturgess	Year of the Tiger
"The Great Beyond"	2018	Unknown	Year of the Tiger
"In Stride"	2021	Stefano Bertelli	The Ides of March
"Get Along"	2021	Ollie Jones	The Ides of March
"A Thousand Words"	2021	Stefano Bertelli	The Ides of March
"Say What You Will"	2024	Gordy De St. Jeor	The Art of Letting Go
"Miss You When You're Gone"	2024	Ollie Jones	The Art of Letting Go

== As featured artist ==
Year	Artist	Album	Track(s)	Position
2001	Mulligan	Striped Suit: Lo-Fi	"Faron", "Make It Three"	Lead guitar
2001	Big Wreck	The Pleasure and the Greed	"Breakthrough"	Backing vocalist
2003	Five Foot Thick	Blood Puddle	"Ducked Out"	Backing vocalist
2005	Fozzy	All That Remains	"Nameless Faceless"	Backing vocalist
2008	Sevendust	Chapter VII: Hope & Sorrow	"Sorrow"	Lead vocalist
2010	Slash	Slash	"Back from Cali", "Starlight"	Lead vocalist, songwriter
2012	Tommy Bolin	Great Gypsy Soul	"Dreamer"	Lead vocalist
2013	Halestorm	The Strange Case Of...	"Here's to Us (Guest Version)"	Lead vocalist
2013	Gov't Mule	Shout!	"Done Got Wise"	Lead vocalist
2015	Richards/Crane	Richards/Crane	"Black & White"	Lead vocalist
2016	Darryl McDaniels	n/a	"Flames (Unnecessary Bullets)"	Lead vocalist (chorus only); additional backing vocalist
2016	Lacuna Coil	Delirium	"Downfall"	Lead guitar
2018	Disturbed	Evolution	"The Sound of Silence (Live)"	Backing vocalist
2018	Hyro the Hero	Flagged Channel	"Never Back Down"	Vocals
2019	Mark Morton	Anesthetic	"Save Defiance"	Lead vocalist

Notes:

- Kennedy performs lead vocals and rhythm guitar on acoustic versions of "Back from Cali," "Fall to Pieces," and "Sweet Child o' Mine" and lead vocals on a live version of "Nightrain," all of which can be found as bonus tracks on the deluxe version of Slash.

== See also ==
- List of songs recorded by Myles Kennedy
