= List of songs recorded by Myles Kennedy =

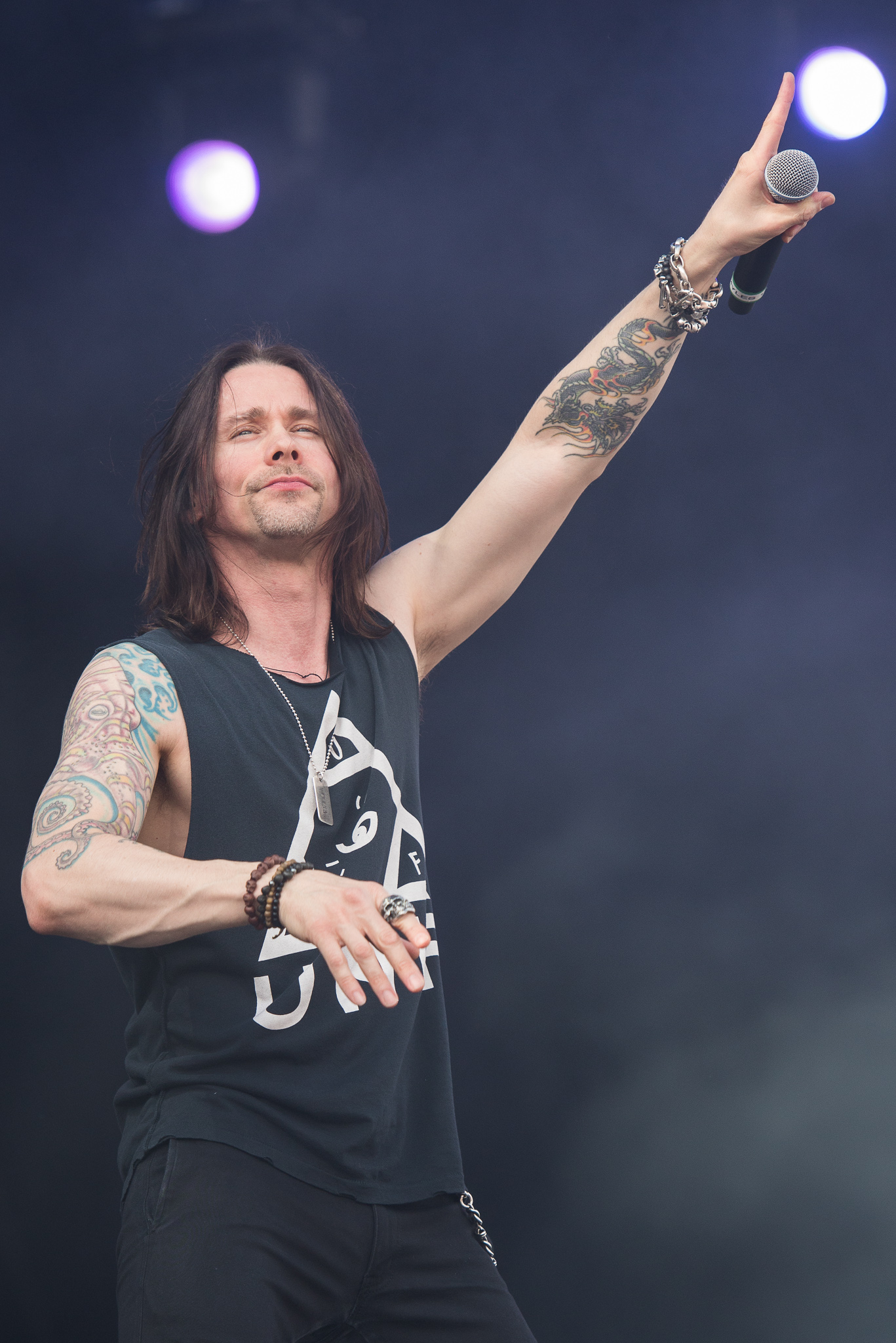
Kennedy performing in 2015

Myles Kennedy is an American guitarist, singer and songwriter. Born in Boston, Massachusetts, he originally began his musical career in Spokane, Washington as the guitarist in jazz band Cosmic Dust. He formed alternative rock band Citizen Swing in 1992, which released two albums before breaking up in 1996. Kennedy and Citizen Swing rhythm guitarist Craig Johnson moved onto The Mayfield Four in 1996, which released two albums during its six-year tenure. Since early 2004, Kennedy's primary band has been Alter Bridge, which he founded with former Creed guitarist Mark Tremonti, bassist Brian Marshall and drummer Scott Phillips.

Outside of his bands, Kennedy has recorded with a range of artists including Big Wreck on "Breakthrough" in 2001, Fozzy on "Nameless Faceless" in 2005, and Sevendust on "Sorrow" in 2008. In 2009, he recorded vocals for two songs on the eponymous debut solo album by former Guns N' Roses and Velvet Revolver guitarist Slash, "Back from Cali" and "Starlight", released the following year. He was later selected by Slash as the vocalist for his solo touring band. Slash and Kennedy, along with The Conspirators (Todd Kerns and Brent Fitz), released Apocalyptic Love in 2012, which was written by the pair. The following year, they collaborated on the title track for the Slash-produced film Nothing Left to Fear, and in 2014 the collective released its second album World on Fire, which was again written by Slash and Kennedy.

Kennedy continued to collaborate with other artists, featuring on the 2013 "guest version" of "Here's to Us" by Halestorm alongside Slash, Shinedown's Brent Smith, Sixx:A.M.'s James Michael, Theory of a Deadman's Tyler Connolly, Disturbed's David Draiman and In This Moment's Maria Brink. Also in 2013, he collaborated with Gov't Mule on "Done Got Wise", and in 2016 he recorded "Downfall" with Italian gothic metal band Lacuna Coil. In 2018, Kennedy released his debut solo album Year of the Tiger, which was written entirely by the vocalist. The third album by Slash, Kennedy and the Conspirators, Living the Dream, followed later in the year.

== Songs ==
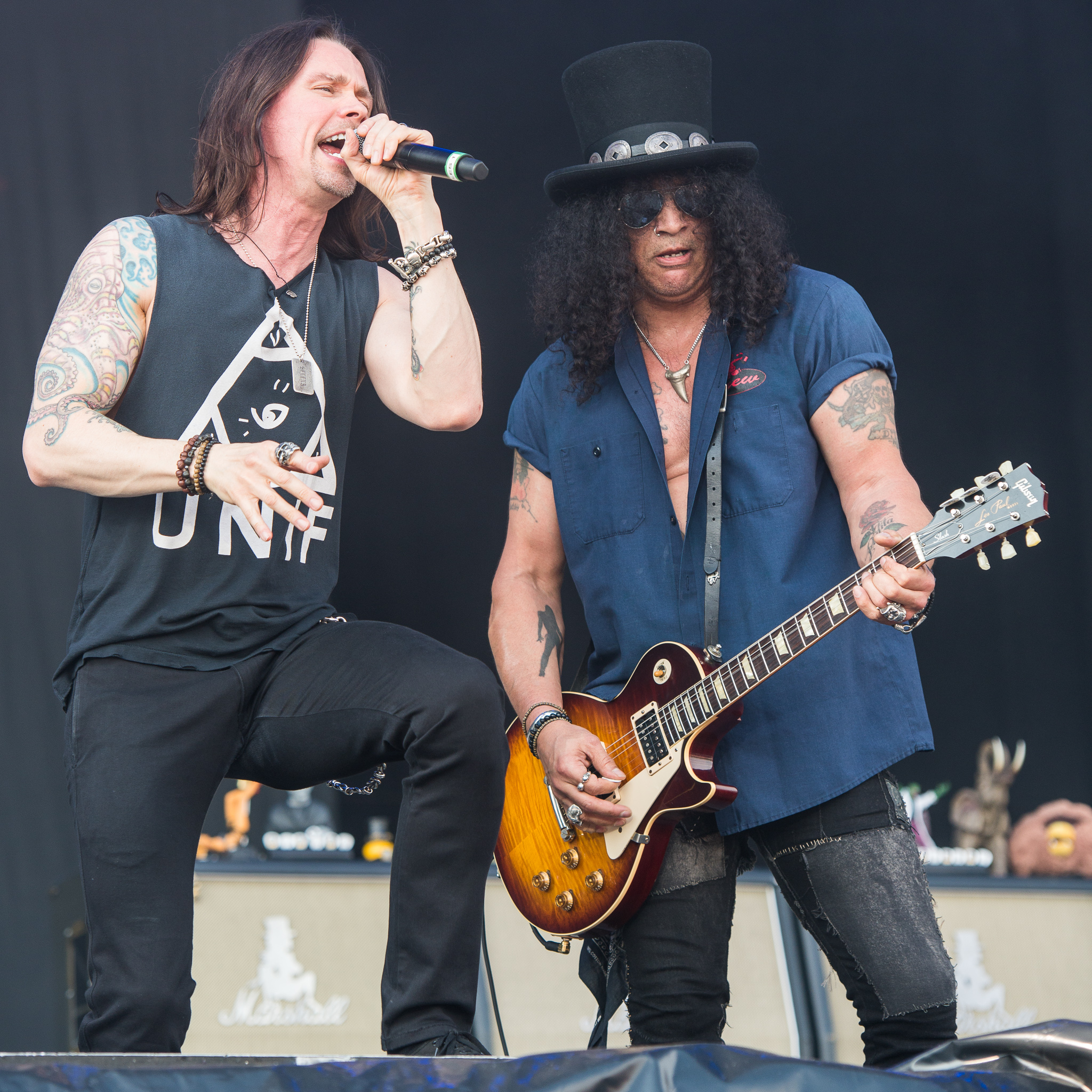
The vocalist first collaborated with Slash in 2009, and has fronted the guitarist's solo band since 2010.

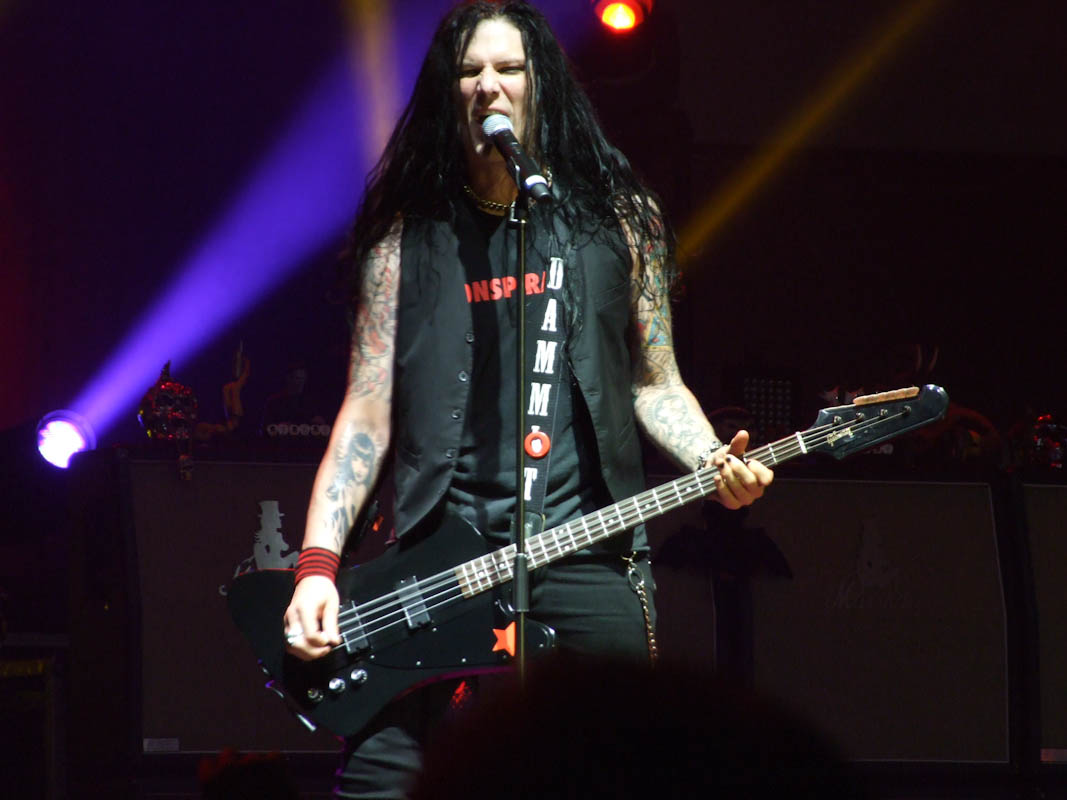
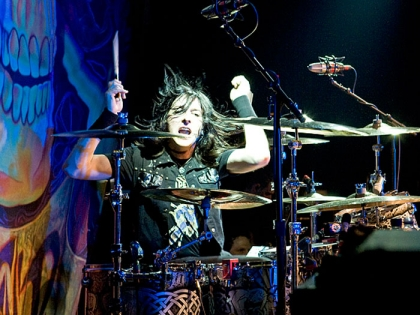
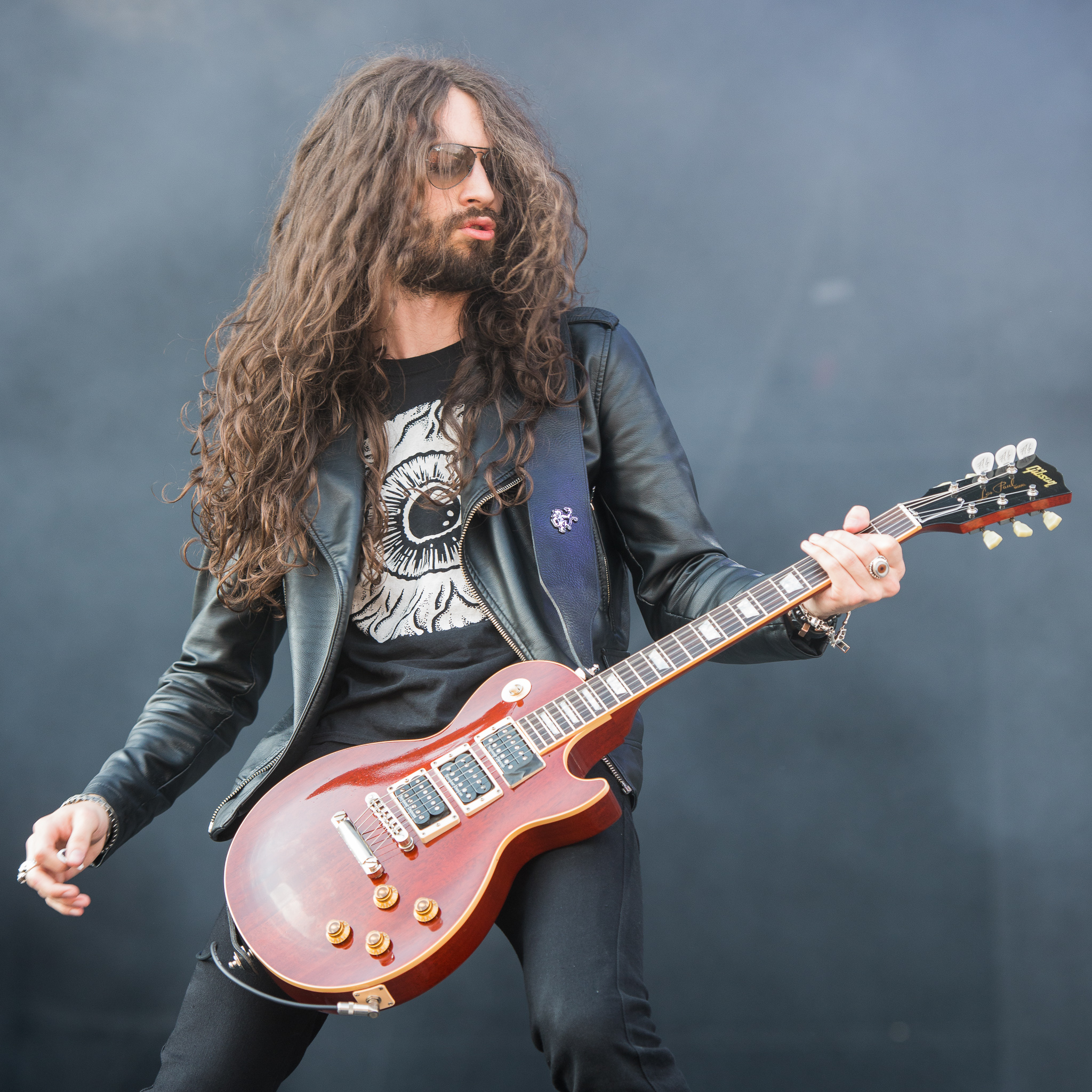
Todd Kerns (top), Brent Fitz (middle) and Frank Sidoris (bottom) are the other three current members of Slash's solo band, known collectively as The Conspirators.

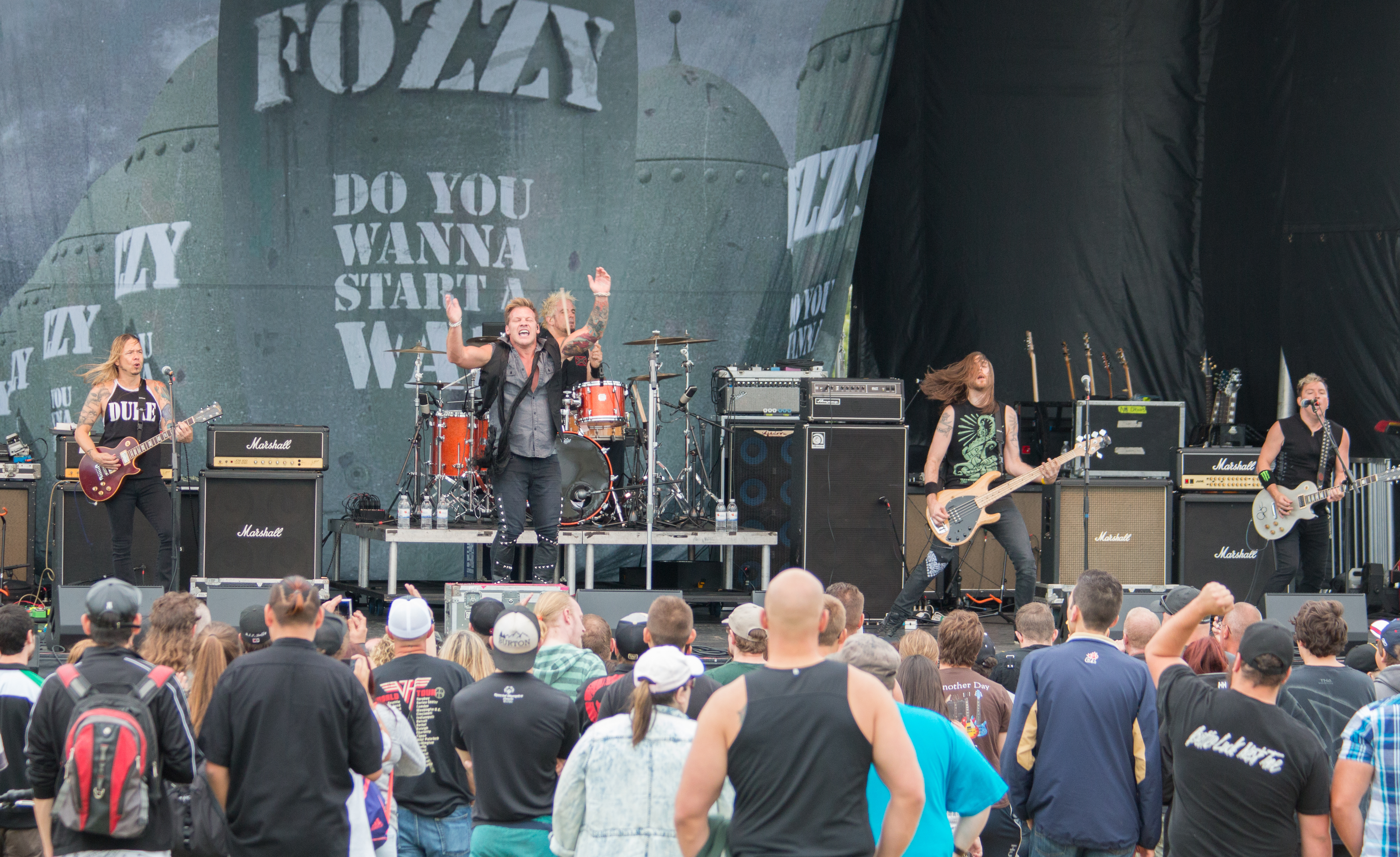
Kennedy was featured on the Fozzy track "Nameless Faceless" in 2005.

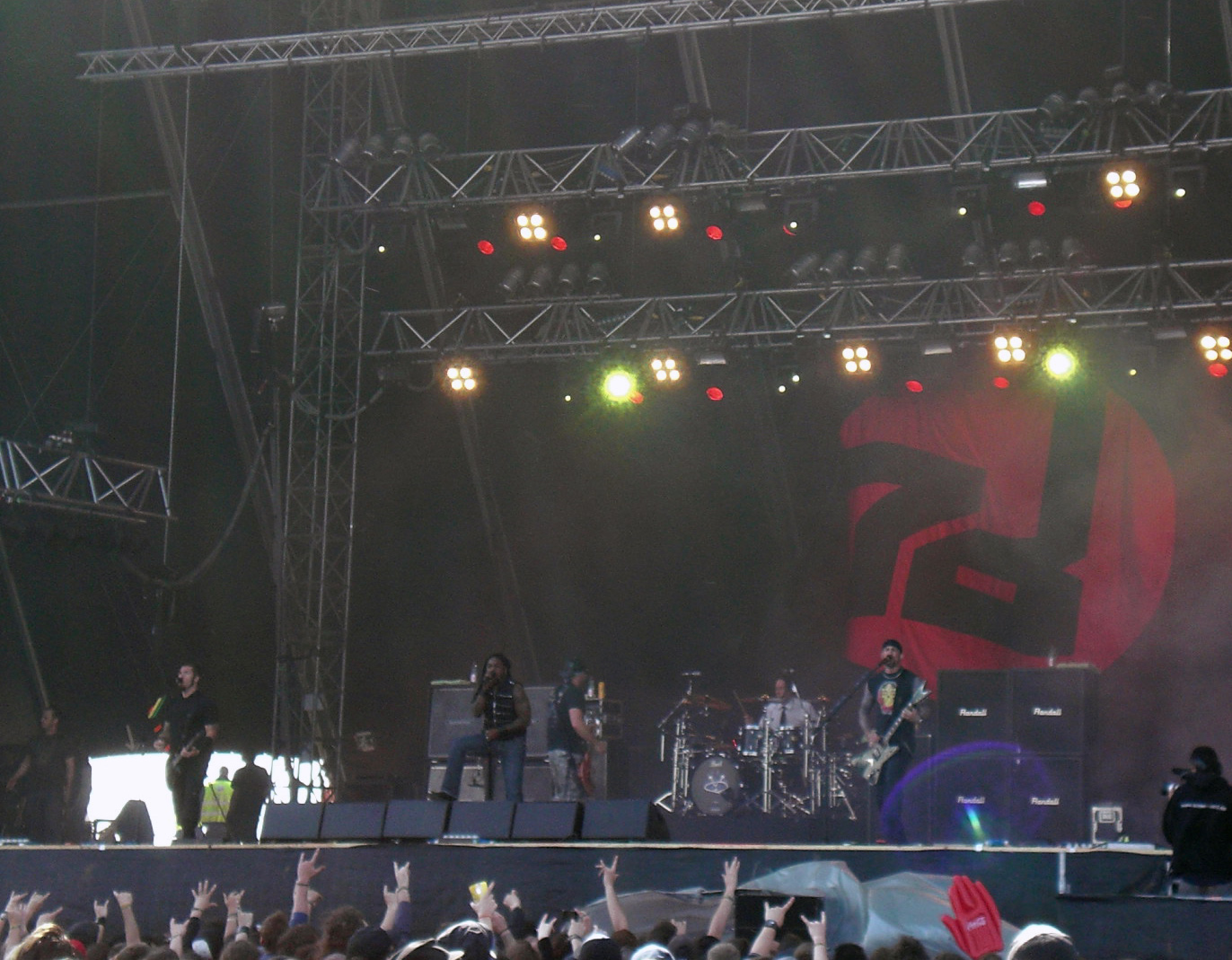
Sevendust featured Kennedy on the 2008 song "Sorrow".

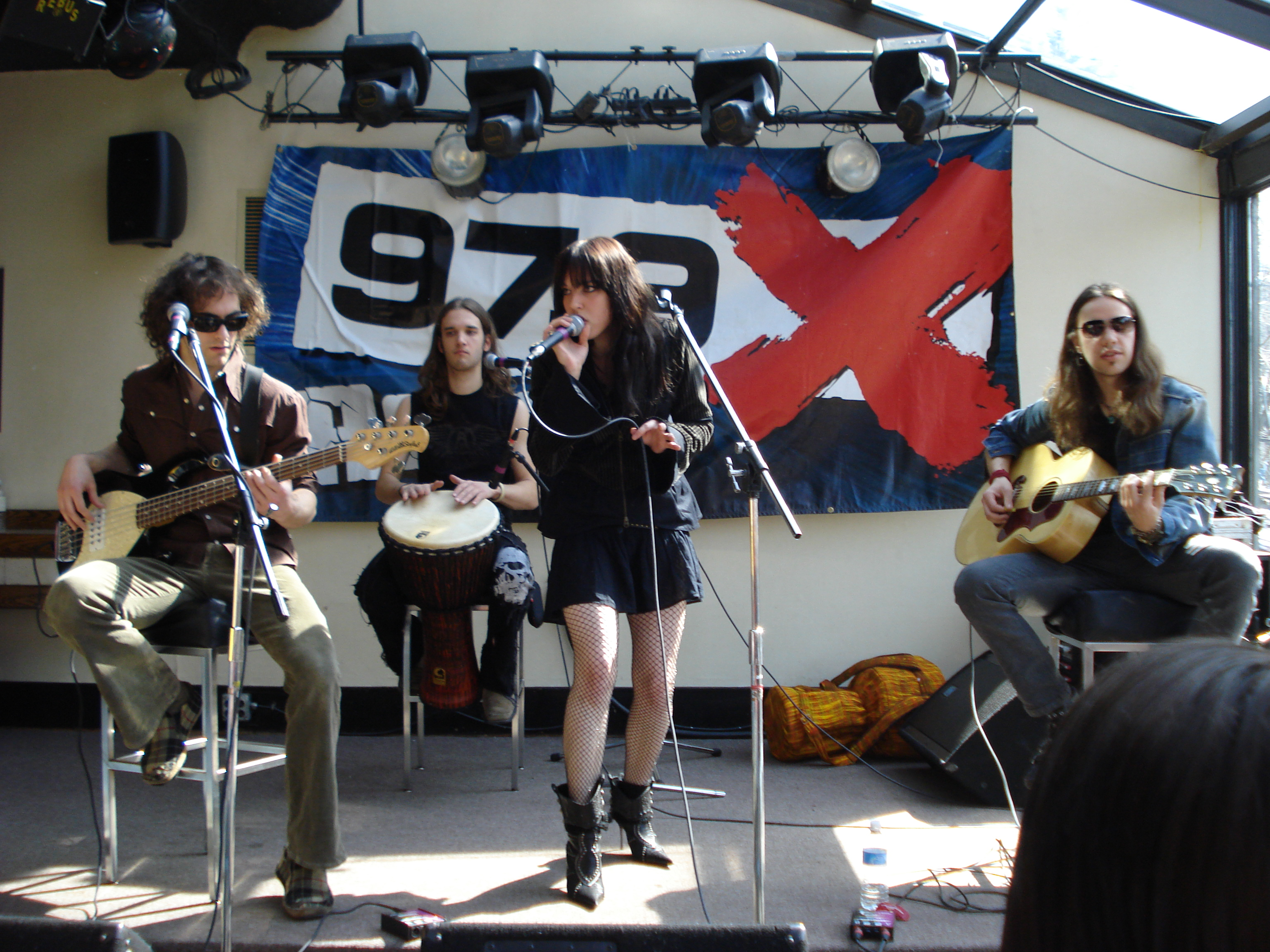
Halestorm featured Kennedy on the "guest version" of the song "Here's to Us" in 2013.

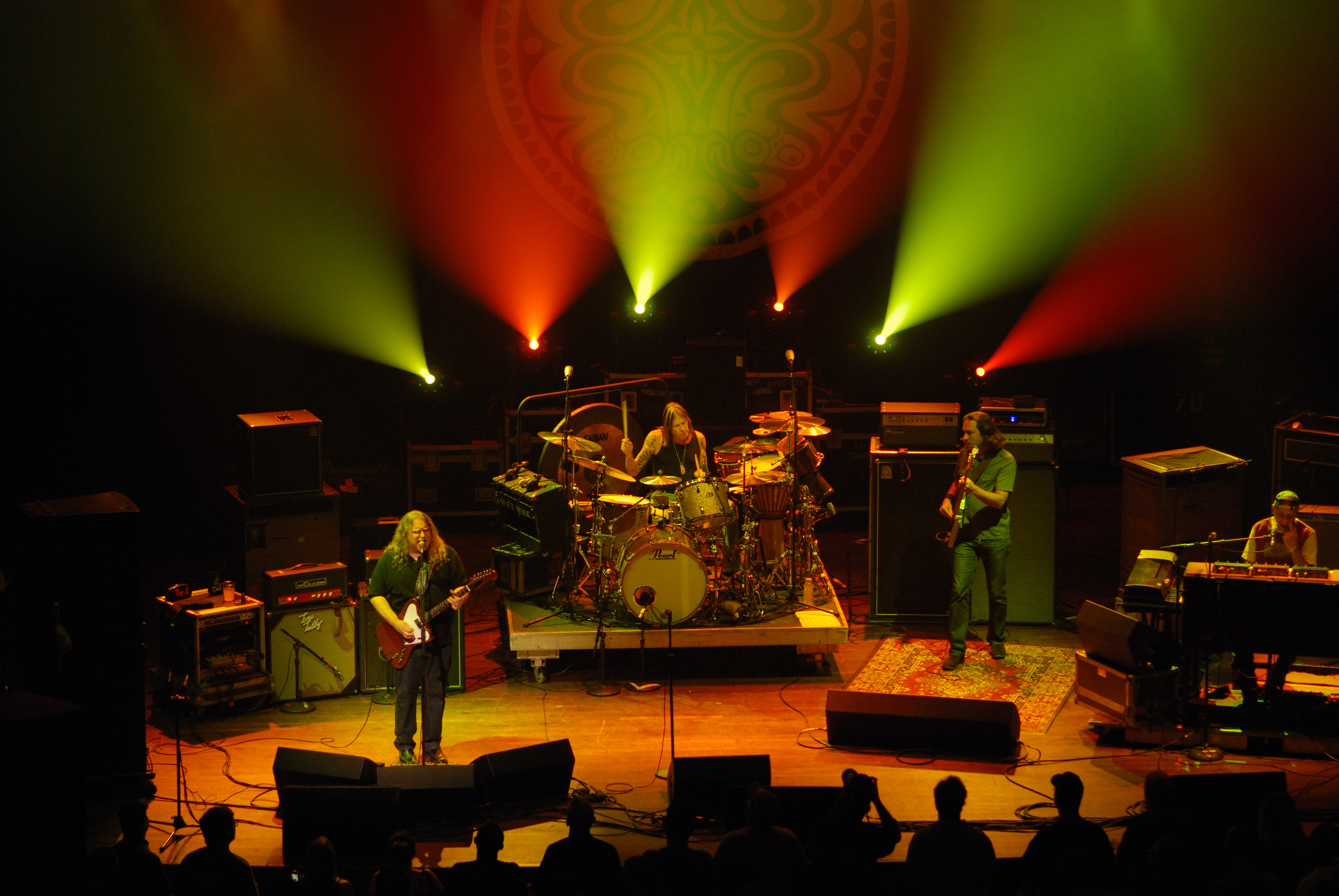
Gov't Mule featured Kennedy on a recording of "Done Got Wild" in 2013.

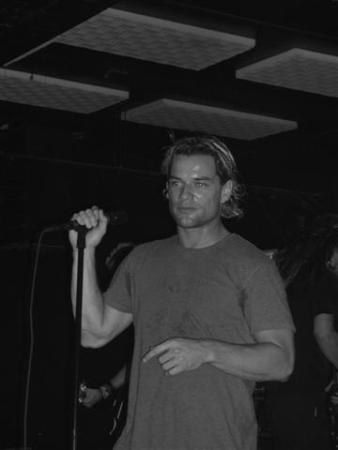
In 2016, Kennedy was featured on the song "Black & White" by Whitfield Crane (pictured) and Lee Richards.

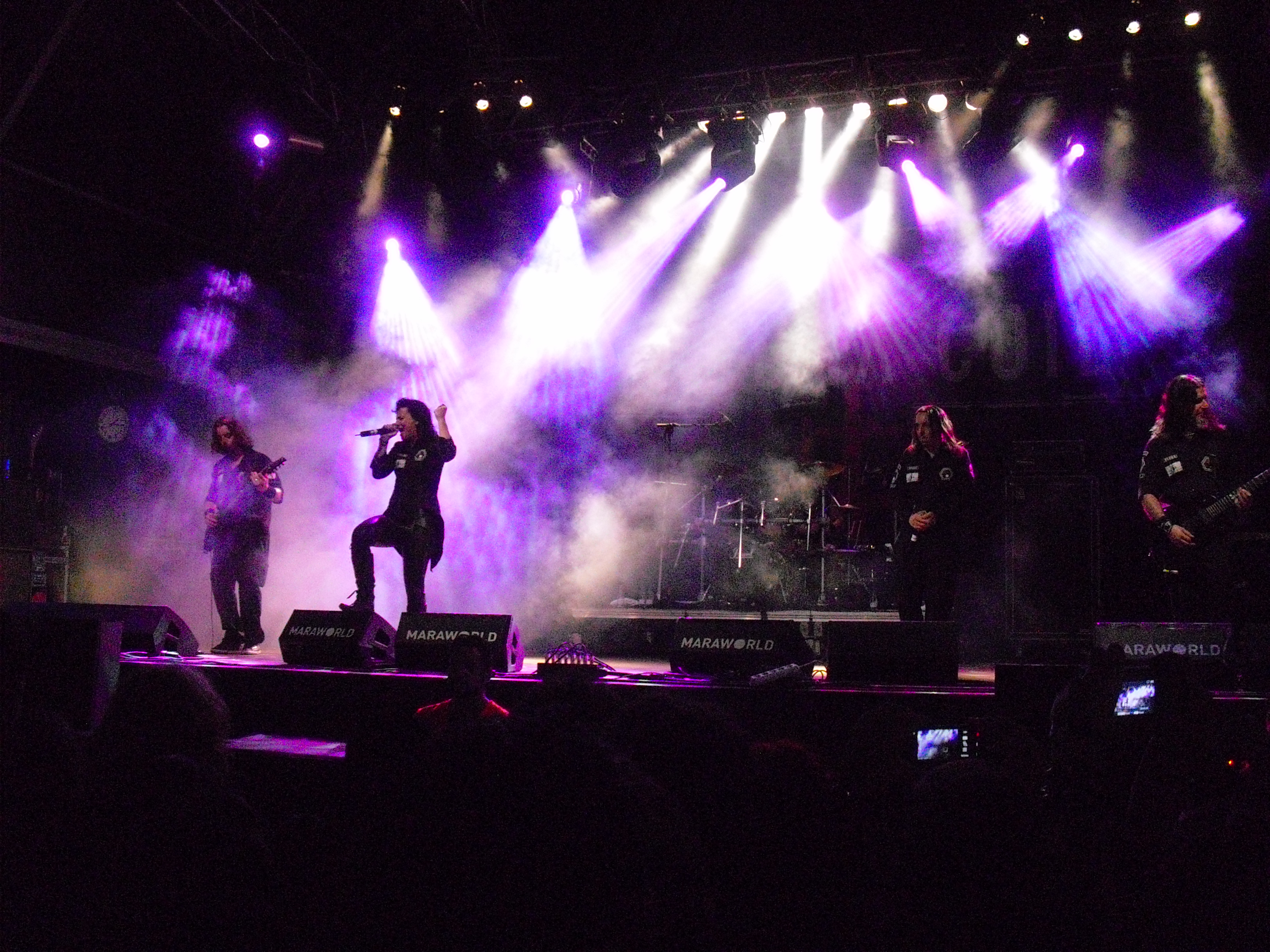
Also in 2016, Kennedy featured on gothic metal band Lacuna Coil's song "Downfall" for the album Delirium.

Key
†	Indicates song released as a single
‡	Indicates song written solely by Kennedy

Title	Other artist(s)	Writer(s)	Release	Year	Ref.
"30 Years to Life"	Slash; The Conspirators	Saul Hudson; Myles Kennedy	World on Fire	2014	
"Anastasia"	Slash; The Conspirators	Saul Hudson; Myles Kennedy	Apocalyptic Love	2012	
"Apocalyptic Love"	Slash; The Conspirators	Saul Hudson; Myles Kennedy	Apocalyptic Love	2012	
"Automatic Overdrive"	Slash; The Conspirators	Saul Hudson; Myles Kennedy	World on Fire	2014	
"Avalon"	Slash; The Conspirators	Saul Hudson; Myles Kennedy	World on Fire	2014	
"Back from Cali" †	Slash; Myles Kennedy	Saul Hudson; Myles Kennedy	Slash	2010	
"Bad Rain"	Slash; The Conspirators	Saul Hudson; Myles Kennedy	Apocalyptic Love	2012	
"Battleground"	Slash; The Conspirators	Saul Hudson; Myles Kennedy	World on Fire	2014	
"Beneath the Savage Sun"	Slash; The Conspirators	Saul Hudson; Myles Kennedy	World on Fire	2014	
"Bent to Fly" †	Slash; The Conspirators	Saul Hudson; Myles Kennedy	World on Fire	2014	
"Black & White"	Richards/Crane	Lee Richards; Whitfield Crane	Richards/Crane	2016	
"Blind Faith"	none	Myles Kennedy ‡	Year of the Tiger	2018	
"Boulevard of Broken Hearts"	Slash; The Conspirators	Saul Hudson; Myles Kennedy	Living the Dream	2018	
"Breakthrough"	Big Wreck	Ian Thornley	The Pleasure and the Greed	2001	
"The Call of the Wild"	Slash; The Conspirators	Saul Hudson; Myles Kennedy	Living the Dream	2018	
"Carolina"	Slash; The Conspirators	Saul Hudson; Myles Kennedy	Apocalyptic Love (special edition)	2012	
"Crazy Life"	Slash; The Conspirators	Saul Hudson; Myles Kennedy	Apocalyptic Love (special edition)	2012	
"Devil on the Wall" †	none	Myles Kennedy ‡	Year of the Tiger	2018	
"Dirty Girl"	Slash; The Conspirators	Saul Hudson; Myles Kennedy	World on Fire	2014	
"The Dissident"	Slash; The Conspirators	Saul Hudson; Myles Kennedy	World on Fire	2014	
"Done Got Wise"	Gov't Mule; Myles Kennedy	Warren Haynes; Jörgen Carlsson; Danny Louis; Matt Abts	Shout!	2013	
"Downfall"	Lacuna Coil	Andrea Ferro; Cristina Scabbia; Marco Coti Zelati; Ryan Blake Folden	Delirium	2016	
"Dreamer"	Tommy Bolin; Nels Cline	Jeff Cook	Great Gypsy Soul	2012	
"Driving Rain" †	Slash; The Conspirators	Saul Hudson; Myles Kennedy	Living the Dream	2018	
"Ducked Out"	Five Foot Thick	Bryan Dilling; George Silva; Silas McQuain	Blood Puddle	2003	
"Far and Away"	Slash; The Conspirators	Saul Hudson; Myles Kennedy	Apocalyptic Love	2012	
"Faron"	Mulligan	Christopher White	Striped Suit: Lo-Fi	2001	
"Ghost of Shangri La"	none	Myles Kennedy ‡	Year of the Tiger	2018	
"The Great Beyond"	none	Myles Kennedy ‡	Year of the Tiger	2018	
"The Great Pretender"	Slash; The Conspirators	Saul Hudson; Myles Kennedy	Living the Dream	2018	
"Halo"	Slash; The Conspirators	Saul Hudson; Myles Kennedy	Apocalyptic Love	2012	
"Hard & Fast"	Slash; The Conspirators	Saul Hudson; Myles Kennedy	Apocalyptic Love	2012	
"Haunted by Design" †	none	Myles Kennedy ‡	Year of the Tiger	2018	
"Here's to Us" (guest version)	Halestorm; Slash; Brent Smith; James Michael; Tyler Connolly; David Draiman; Maria Brink	Lzzy Hale; Toby Gad; Danielle Brisebois	The Strange Case Of... (reissue)	2013	
"Iris of the Storm"	Slash; The Conspirators	Saul Hudson; Myles Kennedy	World on Fire	2014	
"Lost Inside the Girl"	Slash; The Conspirators	Saul Hudson; Myles Kennedy	Living the Dream	2018	
"Love Can Only Heal" †	none	Myles Kennedy ‡	Year of the Tiger	2018	
"Make It Three"	Mulligan	Christopher White	Striped Suit: Lo-Fi	2001	
"Mind Your Manners" †	Slash; The Conspirators	Saul Hudson; Myles Kennedy	Living the Dream	2018	
"Mother"	none	Myles Kennedy ‡	Year of the Tiger	2018	
"My Antidote"	Slash; The Conspirators	Saul Hudson; Myles Kennedy	Living the Dream	2018	
"Nameless Faceless"	Fozzy	Rich Ward	All That Remains	2005	
"No More Heroes"	Slash; The Conspirators	Saul Hudson; Myles Kennedy; Eric Valentine	Apocalyptic Love	2012	
"Not for Me"	Slash; The Conspirators	Saul Hudson; Myles Kennedy	Apocalyptic Love	2012	
"Nothing But a Name"	none	Myles Kennedy ‡	Year of the Tiger	2018	
"Nothing Left to Fear"	Slash; Myles Kennedy	Saul Hudson; Nicholas O'Toole	Nothing Left to Fear	2013	
"One Fine Day"	none	Myles Kennedy ‡	Year of the Tiger	2018	
"One Last Thrill"	Slash; The Conspirators	Saul Hudson; Myles Kennedy	Apocalyptic Love	2012	
"The One You Loved Is Gone"	Slash; The Conspirators	Saul Hudson; Myles Kennedy	Living the Dream	2018	
"Read Between the Lines"	Slash; The Conspirators	Saul Hudson; Myles Kennedy	Living the Dream	2018	
"Serve You Right"	Slash; The Conspirators	Saul Hudson; Myles Kennedy	Living the Dream	2018	
"Shadow Life"	Slash; The Conspirators	Saul Hudson; Myles Kennedy; Todd Kerns	World on Fire	2014	
"Shots Fired"	Slash; The Conspirators	Saul Hudson; Myles Kennedy	Apocalyptic Love	2012	
"Slow Grind"	Slash; The Conspirators	Saul Hudson; Myles Kennedy	Living the Dream	2018	
"Songbird"	none	Myles Kennedy ‡	Year of the Tiger	2018	
"Sorrow"	Sevendust	Lajon Witherspoon; John Connolly; Sonny Mayo; Vinnie Hornsby; Morgan Rose	Chapter VII: Hope & Sorrow	2008	
"Standing in the Sun"	Slash; The Conspirators	Saul Hudson; Myles Kennedy	Apocalyptic Love	2012	
"Starlight"	Slash; Myles Kennedy	Saul Hudson; Myles Kennedy	Slash	2010	
"Stone Blind"	Slash; The Conspirators	Saul Hudson; Myles Kennedy	World on Fire	2014	
"Sugar Cane"	Slash; The Conspirators	Saul Hudson; Myles Kennedy	Living the Dream	2018	
"Too Far Gone"	Slash; The Conspirators	Saul Hudson; Myles Kennedy	World on Fire	2014	
"Turning Stones"	none	Myles Kennedy ‡	Year of the Tiger	2018	
"The Unholy"	Slash; The Conspirators	Saul Hudson; Myles Kennedy	World on Fire	2014	
"We Will Roam"	Slash; The Conspirators	Saul Hudson; Myles Kennedy	Apocalyptic Love	2012	
"Wicked Stone"	Slash; The Conspirators	Saul Hudson; Myles Kennedy	World on Fire	2014	
"Withered Delilah"	Slash; The Conspirators	Saul Hudson; Myles Kennedy	World on Fire	2014	
"World on Fire" †	Slash; The Conspirators	Saul Hudson; Myles Kennedy	World on Fire	2014	
"Year of the Tiger" †	none	Myles Kennedy ‡	Year of the Tiger	2018	
"You're a Lie" †	Slash; The Conspirators	Saul Hudson; Myles Kennedy	Apocalyptic Love	2012	

== See also ==
- Myles Kennedy discography
