= List of Slash band members =

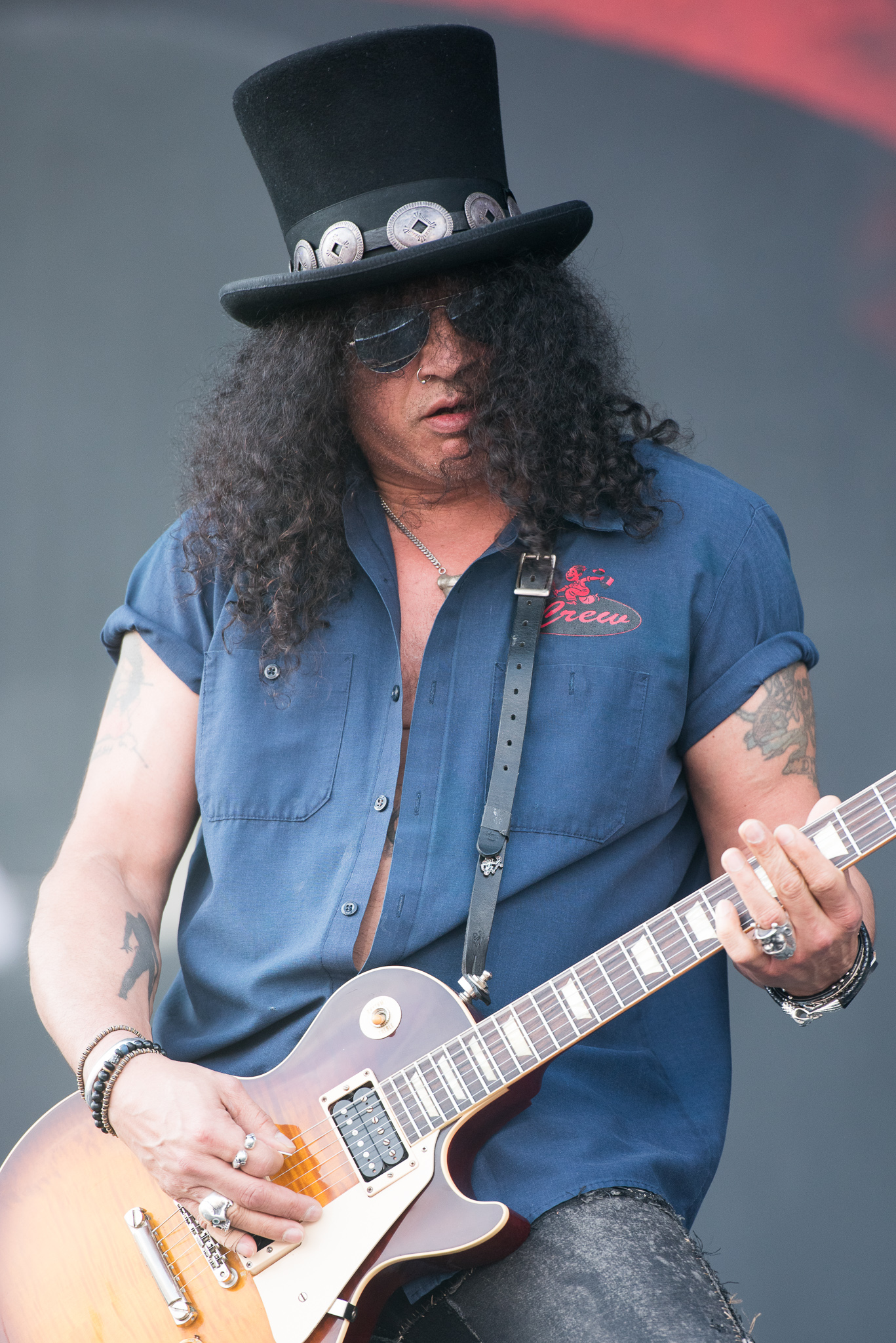
Slash performing live in 2015

Slash is an American hard rock musician. Best known as the lead guitarist of Guns N' Roses (1985–1996 and 2016–present) and Velvet Revolver (2002–2008), he began his solo career in 2009 with the recording of his eponymous debut album. The album featured a range of musicians and vocalists, with the core rhythm section made up of bassist Chris Chaney and drummer Josh Freese. In promotion of the release, Slash toured throughout 2010 and 2011 with vocalist Myles Kennedy (who had recorded two songs for the album), rhythm guitarist Bobby Schneck, bassist Todd Kerns and drummer Brent Fitz. Former Big Wreck bassist Dave Henning was originally planned to be a member of the touring group, but was replaced by Kerns within weeks of the lineup's initial announcement.

After the conclusion of his first solo touring cycle, Slash continued working with Kennedy, Kerns and Fitz on the recording of his second album. Released in 2012, Apocalyptic Love was billed as the first album by "Slash featuring Myles Kennedy and the Conspirators", the new name for the guitarist's backing band. Schneck was not retained for the Apocalyptic Love World Tour, with The Cab's Frank Sidoris announced as his replacement in February 2012. During the promotional tour for 2014's World on Fire, Slash and his band recorded their third live release Live at the Roxy 9.25.14, which was the first to feature Sidoris on guitar. The guitarist became a full member of the band in 2018, when he contributed to his first Slash studio recording, Living the Dream, which was released later in the year.

== Official members ==
=== Current members ===
Image	Name	Years active	Instruments	Release contributions
	Slash	2010–present	lead guitar; backing vocals	all Slash solo releases
	Myles Kennedy	2010–present	lead vocals; rhythm guitar	all Slash solo releases
	Brent Fitz	2010–present	drums; percussion; piano; keyboards; backing vocals	all Slash solo releases since Live in Manchester (2010)
	Todd Kerns	2010–present	bass; backing and occasional lead vocals	all Slash solo releases since Live in Manchester (2010)
	Frank Sidoris	2012–present (touring 2012–18)	rhythm guitar; backing vocals	all Slash solo releases since Live at the Roxy 9.25.14 (2015)

=== Former members ===
Image	Name	Years active	Instruments	Release contributions
	Bobby Schneck	2010–2011	rhythm guitar; backing vocals	Live in Manchester (2010); Made in Stoke 24/7/11 (2011)
	Dave Henning	2010	bass	none – rehearsals only

== Other contributors ==
=== Session musicians ===
Image	Name	Years active	Instruments	Release contributions
	Chris Chaney	2009	bass; acoustic guitar	Slash (2010)
	Josh Freese	2009	drums; percussion	Slash (2010)
	Lenny Castro	2009	percussion	Slash (2010)

=== Touring substitutes ===
Image	Name	Years active	Instruments	Details
	Tony Montana	2010	bass; backing vocals	Montana replaced Kerns between July and August 2010 while Kerns was recovering from surgery.
	Cory Churko	2019	rhythm guitar; backing vocals	Churko replaced Sidoris in June 2019 while Sidoris took leave due to health issues concerning his wife.
	Shane Gaalaas	2019	drums	Gaalaas replaced Fitz in August 2019 while Fitz was recovering from emergency surgery.

== Lineups ==
Period	Members	Releases
March – November 2009	Slash – lead and rhythm guitars; Chris Chaney – bass, acoustic guitar; Josh Freese – drums, percussion; Lenny Castro – percussion	Slash (2010)
March 2010	Slash – lead guitar, backing vocals; Myles Kennedy – lead vocals, rhythm guitar; Bobby Schneck – rhythm guitar, backing vocals; Dave Henning – bass; Brent Fitz – drums, percussion, piano, keyboards, backing vocals	none – rehearsals only
March 2010 – July 2011	Slash – lead guitar, backing vocals; Myles Kennedy – lead vocals, rhythm guitar; Bobby Schneck – rhythm guitar, backing vocals; Todd Kerns – bass, backing vocals; Brent Fitz – drums, percussion, piano, keyboards, backing vocals	Live in Manchester (2010); Made in Stoke 24/7/11 (2011)
October 2011 – February 2012	Slash – lead guitar, backing vocals; Myles Kennedy – lead vocals, rhythm guitar; Todd Kerns – bass, backing vocals; Brent Fitz – drums, percussion, piano, keyboards, backing vocals	Apocalyptic Love (2012)
February 2012 – present	Slash – lead guitar, backing vocals; Myles Kennedy – lead vocals, rhythm guitar; Frank Sidoris – rhythm guitar, backing vocals (touring only until 2018); Todd Kerns – bass, backing vocals; Brent Fitz – drums, percussion, piano, keyboards, backing vocals	World on Fire (2014); Live at the Roxy 9.25.14 (2015); Living the Dream (2018); Living the Dream Tour (2019); 4 (2022); Flying Blind (2027)
