= World on Fire World Tour =

2014–15 concert tour by Slash

- Tour by Slash featuring Myles Kennedy and the Conspirators
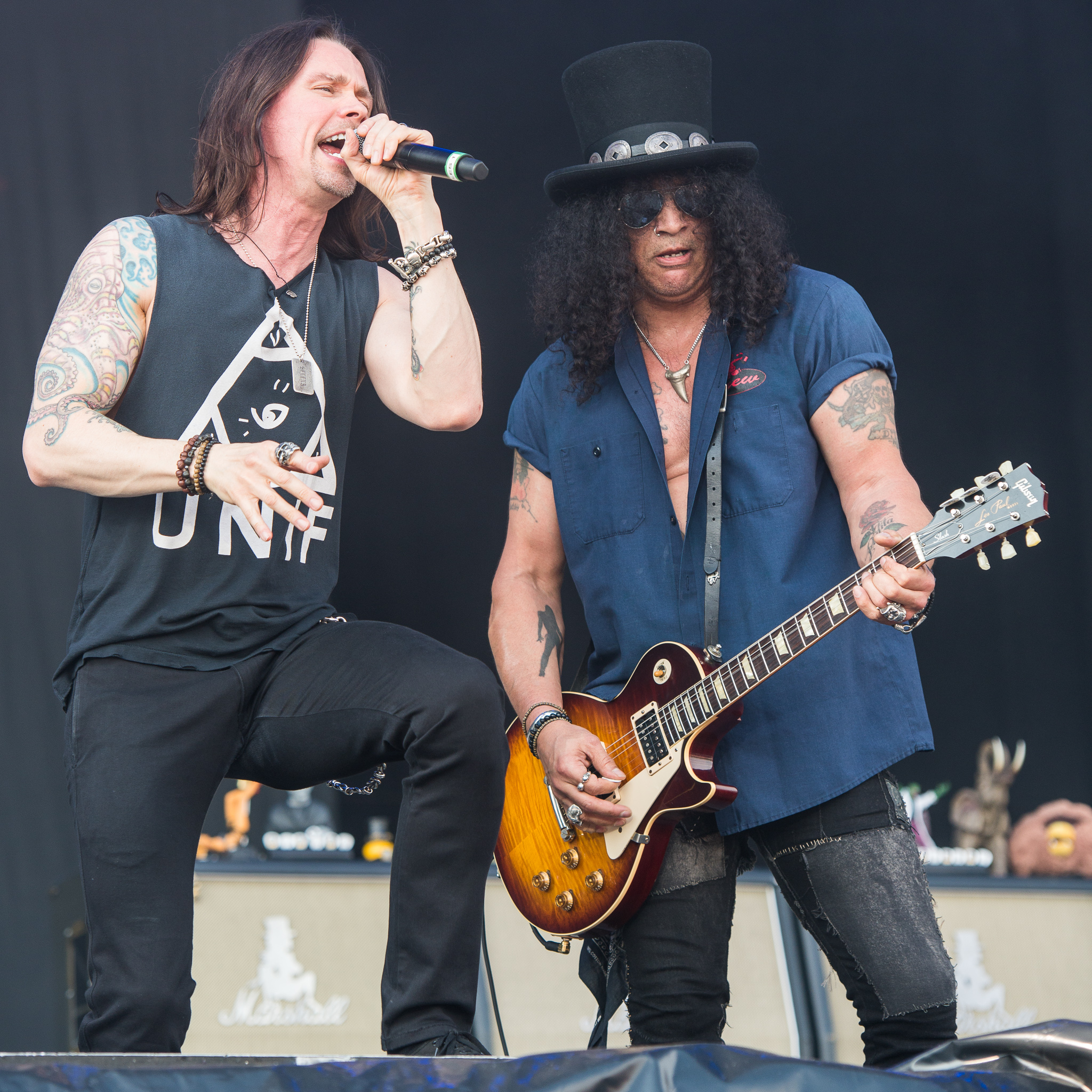
- Slash and Myles Kennedy at the Rock im Park Festival in 2015
- Location: Asia; Europe; North America; Oceania; South America
- Associated album: World on Fire
- Start date: July 9, 2014
- End date: November 24, 2015
- Legs: 10
- No. of shows: 152

Slash featuring Myles Kennedy and the Conspirators concert chronology
- Apocalyptic Love World Tour (2012–13); World on Fire World Tour (2014–15); Living the Dream Tour (2018–19)

The World on Fire World Tour was the third concert tour by lead guitarist Slash as a solo artist, which started in July 2014 and was scheduled to resume in late 2015, in support of Slash's third solo album World on Fire. The tour features the same backing band that performed with Slash during his two last tours, billed as "Slash featuring Myles Kennedy and The Conspirators", featuring Myles Kennedy handling lead vocal, bassist Todd Kerns, drummer Brent Fitz and rhythm guitarist Frank Sidoris.

The set list during the tour included songs from Guns N' Roses, Velvet Revolver and Slash's Snakepit beside songs from Slash's solo albums, spawning the DVD Live at the Roxy.

== Tour dates ==
List of 2014 concerts
Date	City	Country	Venue
July 9, 2014	Hampton Beach	United States	Hampton Beach Casino Ballroom
July 10, 2014	Wantagh	United States	Jones Beach Theatre^{[A]}
July 11, 2014	Ottawa	Canada	Ottawa Bluesfest
July 13, 2014	Kitchener	Canada	Big Music Fest
July 16, 2014	Mansfield	United States	Xfinity Center^{[A]}
July 20, 2014	Northfield	United States	Hard Rock Club
July 22, 2014	Cincinnati	United States	Riverbend Music Center^{[A]}
July 25, 2014	Tinley Park	United States	Hollywood Casino^{[A]}
July 26, 2014	Kansas City	United States	Voodoo Lounge Club
July 30, 2014	Inglewood	United States	Inglewood Forum^{[A]}
August 1, 2014	Scottsdale	United States	Talking Stick Resort
August 2, 2014	Las Vegas	United States	MGM Grand Garden Arena^{[A]}
August 8, 2014	Stateline	United States	Lake Tahoe Outdoor Arena^{[A]}
August 9, 2014	Temecula	United States	Pechanga Resort and Casino
August 13, 2014	San Francisco	United States	Fillmore Theatre
August 15, 2014	Vancouver	Canada	Hard Rock Casino Vancouver
August 16, 2014	George	United States	The Gorge Amphitheatre^{[A]}
August 19, 2014	Denver	United States	Pepsi Center^{[A]}
August 22, 2014	Dallas	United States	American Airlines Center^{[A]}
August 25, 2014	The Woodlands	United States	The Cynthia Woods Mitchell Pavilion^{[A]}
August 28, 2014	Atlanta	United States	Philips Arena^{[A]}
August 29, 2014	Hollywood	United States	Seminole Hard Rock Hotel
August 31, 2014	Atlantic City	United States	Boardwalk Hall^{[A]}
September 3, 2014	Newark	United States	Prudential Center^{[A]}
September 5, 2014	Mashantucket	United States	Foxwoods Resort Casino
September 6, 2014	Bristow	United States	Jiffy Lube Live^{[A]}
September 9, 2014	Clarkston	United States	DTE Energy Music Theatre^{[A]}
September 12, 2014	Sydney	Canada	Open Hearth Park^{[A]}
September 23, 2014	Los Angeles	United States	Troubadour Club
September 25, 2014	Los Angeles	United States	Roxy Theatre
September 26, 2014	Los Angeles	United States	Whisky a Go Go
November 7, 2014	Glasgow	Scotland	O2 Academy Glasgow
November 9, 2014	Dublin	Ireland	3Arena
November 12, 2014	Paris	France	Le Zénith
November 13, 2014	Paris	France	Le Zénith
November 15, 2014	Basel	Switzerland	St. Jakobshalle
November 16, 2014	Turin	Italy	Pala Alpitour
November 17, 2014	Florence	Italy	Nelson Mandela Forum
November 19, 2014	Vienna	Austria	Wiener Stadthalle
November 20, 2014	Kraków	Poland	Tauron Arena Kraków
November 22, 2014	Munich	Germany	Zenith Arena
November 23, 2014	Cologne	Germany	Palladium Center
November 24, 2014	Amsterdam	Netherlands	Heineken Music Hall
November 26, 2014	Brussels	Belgium	Forest National
November 28, 2014	Manchester	England	Phones 4u Arena
November 29, 2014	Leeds	England	Leeds Arena
December 1, 2014	Birmingham	England	National Exhibition Centre
December 2, 2014	London	England	Wembley Arena
December 4, 2014	Glasgow	Scotland	Hydro Arena
December 6, 2014	Reykjavík	Iceland	Laugardalshöll

List of 2015 concerts
Date	City	Country	Venue
February 9, 2015	Osaka	Japan	Namba Hatch Club
February 10, 2015	Tokyo	Japan	AgeHa
February 12, 2015	Tokyo	Japan	Shibuya O-East
February 14, 2015	Kuala Lumpur	Malaysia	Sunway Lagoon
February 17, 2015	Hamilton	New Zealand	Claudelands Arena
February 18, 2015	Wellington	New Zealand	TSB Bank Arena
February 21, 2015	Melbourne	Australia	Soundwave Festival
February 22, 2015	Adelaide	Australia	Soundwave Festival
February 24, 2015	Sydney	Australia	Hordern Pavilion
February 26, 2015	Melbourne	Australia	Festival Hall
February 28, 2015	Brisbane	Australia	Soundwave Festival
March 1, 2015	Sydney	Australia	Soundwave Festival
March 4, 2015	Santiago	Chile	Teatro Caupolicán
March 6, 2015	Buenos Aires	Argentina	Teatro Vorterix
March 7, 2015	Buenos Aires	Argentina	Mandarine Park
March 9, 2015	Lima	Peru	Exposition Park
March 11, 2015	Quito	Ecuador	Agora House of Culture
March 14, 2015	Rio de Janeiro	Brazil	Fundição Progresso
March 15, 2015	Belo Horizonte	Brazil	Galopeira Gymnasium
March 17, 2015	Brasília	Brazil	Net Live Hall
March 19, 2015	Curitiba	Brazil	Masters Hall
March 20, 2015	Porto Alegre	Brazil	Pepsi on Stage
March 22, 2015	São Paulo	Brazil	Espaço das Américas
March 25, 2015	Mexico City	Mexico	Palacio de los Deportes
March 26, 2015	Guadalajara	Mexico	Teatro Estúdio Cavaret
March 28, 2015	Monterrey	Mexico	Auditorio Banamex
April 25, 2015	Orlando	United States	Central Florida Fairgrounds
April 26, 2015	Jacksonville	United States	Rockville Festival
April 28, 2015	New Orleans	United States	House of Blues
April 29, 2015	Mobile	United States	Soul Kitchen Club
May 1, 2015	Memphis	United States	Beale Street Music Festival
May 3, 2015	Concord	United States	Carolina Rebellion Festival
May 5, 2015	Stroudsburg	United States	Sherman Theater
May 7, 2015	New York City	United States	Terminal 5
May 8, 2015	Hampton Beach	United States	Hampton Beach Casino Ballroom
May 9, 2015	Bangor	United States	Rise Above Festival
May 12, 2015	Sayreville	United States	Starland Ballroom
May 13, 2015	Baltimore	United States	Rams Head Live!
May 15, 2015	Columbus	United States	Rock on the Range
May 16, 2015	Camden	United States	MMRBQ Fest
May 18, 2015	Chicago	United States	Concord Music Hall
May 19, 2015	Sioux City	United States	Hard Rock Festival
May 21, 2015	Austin	United States	Stubb's Waller Creek
May 23, 2015	Houston	United States	House of Blues
May 24, 2015	Dallas	United States	Southside Ballroom
May 28, 2015	Helsinki	Finland	Helsinki Ice Hall
May 31, 2015	Stockholm	Sweden	Gröna Lund
June 1, 2015	Oslo	Norway	Sentrum Scene
June 4, 2015	Solvesborg	Sweden	Sweden Rock Festival
June 5, 2015	Nürburgring	Germany	Rock am Ring
June 7, 2015	Nuremberg	Germany	Rock im Park
June 8, 2015	Berlin	Germany	Zitadelle
June 12, 2015	Landgraaf	Netherlands	Pinkpop Festival
June 14, 2015	Leicestershire	England	Download Festival
June 16, 2015	Hamburg	Germany	Alsterdorfer Sporthalle
June 17, 2015	Esch-sur-Alzette	Luxembourg	Rockhal
June 19, 2015	Dessel	Belgium	Graspop Metal Meeting
June 20, 2015	Clisson	France	Hellfest
June 23, 2015	Rome	Italy	Rock in Roma
June 24, 2015	Milan	Italy	Datch Forum di Assago
June 26, 2015	Zagreb	Croatia	Šalata Sports Center
June 28, 2015	Bucharest	Romania	Arlene Romane
June 29, 2015	Sofia	Bulgaria	Hristo Bostev Hall
July 1, 2015	Sopron	Hungary	Volt Festival
July 2, 2015	Vienna	Austria	Castle Clam
July 4, 2015	Geneva	Switzerland	Arena
July 5, 2015	Nice	France	Théâtre de verdure de Nice
July 7, 2015	Madrid	Spain	Barclaycard Center
July 8, 2015	Barcelona	Spain	St. Jordi Club
July 10, 2015	Aix-les-Bains	France	Musilac Festival
September 18, 2015	Providence	United States	Lupo's Heartbreak Hotel
September 19, 2015	Clark	United States	Food Truck And Rock Carnival
September 21, 2015	Hamilton	Canada	Hamilton Place Theatre
September 23, 2015	Toronto	Canada	Sound Academy
September 24, 2015	Montreal	Canada	Métropolis
September 26, 2015	Northfield	United States	Hard Rock Club
September 27, 2015	Detroit	United States	The Fillmore Detroit
September 29, 2015	Grand Rapids	United States	Intersection Space
September 30, 2015	Fort Wayne	United States	Piere's Entertainment Center
October 2, 2015	Marksville	United States	Paragon Casino
October 3, 2015	Memphis	United States	New Daisy Theater
October 4, 2015	Louisville	United States	Louder Than Life Festival
October 7, 2015	Minneapolis	United States	Mill City Nights
October 9, 2015	Calgary	Canada	Grey Eagle Casino
October 10, 2015	Edmonton	Canada	Jubilee Auditorium
October 12, 2015	Vancouver	Canada	Queen Elizabeth Theatre
October 13, 2015	Seattle	United States	Moore Theatre
October 15, 2015	Salt Lake City	United States	The Depot
October 16, 2015	Denver	United States	Fillmore Auditorium
October 18, 2015	San Francisco	United States	Warfield Theatre
October 20, 2015	Chandler	United States	Wild Horse Pass Casino
October 21, 2015	Anaheim	United States	House of Blues
October 23, 2015	Los Angeles	United States	Hollywood Palladium
October 24, 2015	Temecula	United States	Pechanga Resort and Casino
November 7, 2015	Mumbai	India	MTV Extreme Fest
November 14, 2015	Bangalore	India	MTV Extreme Fest
November 18, 2015	Budapest	Hungary	Sports Arena
November 19, 2015	Prague	Czech Republic	Small Sport Hall
November 20, 2015	Łódź	Poland	Atlas Arena
November 22, 2015	Minsk	Belarus	Prime Club
November 24, 2015	Moscow	Russia	Ray Arena

A Supporting Aerosmith

== Personnel ==
=== Main band ===
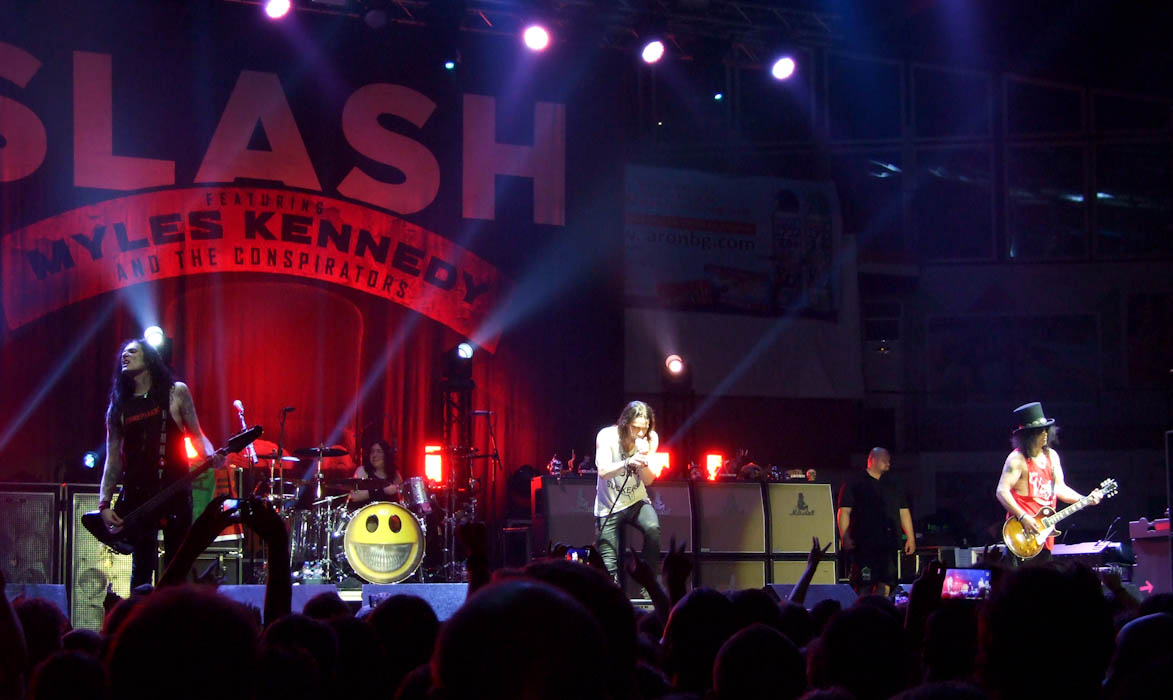
Slash and his band live in 2015. From left to right: Kerns, Kennedy, Sidoris and Slash, with Fitz in the back.

- Slash – lead guitar, slide guitar, acoustic guitar, backing vocals
- Myles Kennedy – lead vocals, rhythm guitar, acoustic guitar
- Todd Kerns – bass, backing and lead vocals (on selected songs)
- Brent Fitz – drums, backing vocals
- Frank Sidoris – rhythm guitar, acoustic guitar, backing vocals

=== Live guests ===
During the tour, the following musicians joined Slash and the band on stage:

- Duff McKagan – bass, backing vocals "It's So Easy" and "Paradise City" (Gorge 2014 / Buenos Aires 2015)
- Gilby Clarke – rhythm guitar on "Paradise City" and "Mr. Brownstone" (Buenos Aires 2015 / Porto Alegre 2015 / São Paulo 2015 / Clark 2015)
- Phill Campbell – guitar on "Hey-Hey-Hey-Hey!" and "Ace of Spades" (Birmingham 2014)
- Kimberly Nichole – lead vocals on "Hey Joe" (NYC 2015)
- Michael Monroe – lead vocals on "We're All Gonna Die" and "Dr. Alibi" (Helsinki)
- Doda – lead vocals on "Sweet Child o' Mine" (Łódź 2015)
