= Flying Blind (Slash album) =

Studio album by Slash Featuring Myles Kennedy and the Conspirators
- Released: February 26, 2027
- Studio: Studio Barbarosa
- Genre: Rock
- Label: Gibson Records
- Producer: Michael Baskette

Slash chronology
4 (2022)	Flying Blind (2027)

Myles Kennedy chronology
Alter Bridge (2026)	Flying Blind (2027)

Singles from Flying Blind
- 1. "Flying Blind" Released: October 2, 2026

Flying Blind is the fifth studio album by Slash featuring Myles Kennedy and the Conspirators. It is a follow up to 2021's 4. The album is set to be released on February 26, 2027.

== Track listing ==
All tracks are written by Slash and Myles Kennedy.

No.	Title	Length
1.	"Avarice and Greed"	4:04
2.	"Good Time Girl"	3:44
3.	"Thrill Seeker"	3:44
4.	"One of Your Kind"	4:34
5.	"Flying Blind"	4:42
6.	"Looking For Miracles"	4:41
7.	"Sweet Kill"	4:03
8.	"Here In Babylon"	3:42
9.	"Living the Dream"	3:30
10.	"(Don't) Thread the Needle"	5:10
11.	"Rev My Heart"	3:14
12.	"Stem the Flow"	5:39
13.	" Feel Like Makin' Love" (cover)	5:38
Total length:		56:25

== Background ==
In an interview with Blabbermouth, Slash explained how the title track, Flying Blind came together while in the studio and how it became the lead single, "I had nothing of that song prior to those guys coming in, and then we started up a night of rehearsal. As for the first single, you never know what the first single is going to be until you've recorded it." Myles Kennedy adds that the title track examines the shortcuts people sometimes pursue in search for fulfillment. Flying Blind explores a range of sound without abandoning the band's direct, hard-rock foundation across the album's 12 tracks.

According to Loudwire, Myles Kennedy praises Slash for being an incredible riff writer and coming up with simple chord progressions that are compelling for melodies. Flying Blind was recorded in Studio Barbarosa with Michael "Elvis" Baskette returning as the producer for the record. Slash featuring Myles Kennedy and the Conspirators announced the tour starting on April 2, 2027.

== Personnel ==
=== Slash featuring Myles Kennedy and the Conspirators ===
- Slash – lead guitar
- Myles Kennedy – lead vocals
- Todd Kerns – bass, backing vocals
- Brent Fitz – drums, percussion, piano
- Frank Sidoris – rhythm guitar

Additional personnel

- Michael Baskette - producer, mixing engineer
- Jeff Moll - recording engineer
- Josh Saldate - mixing engineer
- Ted Jensen - mastering engineer
