= Live in Manchester (Slash album) =

Live album by Slash featuring Myles Kennedy
- Released: July 3, 2010
- Recorded: July 3, 2010 at the Manchester Academy, Manchester, England
- Genre: Hard rock, heavy metal
- Length: 120:42
- Label: Dik Hayd International
- Producer: Paul Nickson

Slash chronology
| Slash (2010) | Live in Manchester (2010) | Made in Stoke 24/7/11 (2011) |

Myles Kennedy chronology
| Live from Amsterdam (2009) | Live in Manchester (2010) | AB III (2010) |

Live in Manchester is a double live album by Guns N' Roses guitarist Slash featuring Alter Bridge frontman Myles Kennedy. The album was recorded by Abbey Road Live, during Slash's solo show at the Manchester Academy on July 3, 2010. Copies of the album were limited to 1,200 with 350 being sold at the show itself.

== Background ==
In June 2010, it was announced that the show at the Manchester Academy in Manchester, England on July 3, part of the 2010 World Tour, would be recorded and released on CD. Only 1,200 copies of the album were made available with 350 being sold after the show itself. The album was recorded, mixed and mastered "on-the-fly" during the show by Abbey Road Live. This type of recording differs from a “board” mix, which usually involves plugging into the house sound console and taking their mix, with the album quality closer to a studio mixed live album.

During the show, Slash, along with his touring band which consists of Myles Kennedy, Bobby Schneck, Todd Kerns and Brent Fitz, performed songs from his debut solo album, Slash, as well as songs from bands prominent in his career such as Guns N' Roses ("Sweet Child o' Mine", "Paradise City"), Slash's Snakepit ("Beggars & Hangers-on", "Mean Bone") and Velvet Revolver ("Fall to Pieces", "Slither"). Also performed was a cover of the Alter Bridge single "Rise Today" and Led Zeppelin's "Communication Breakdown" as well as an extended guitar solo by Slash which ended with a performance of The Godfather theme "Speak Softly Love" (listed as "Godfather" on the track listing).

In July, the recordings of the show were made available for streaming on YouTube.

== Track listing ==
Disc one
| No. | Title | Writer(s) | Length |
|---|---|---|---|
| 1. | "Ghost" (from Slash) | Slash, Ian Astbury | 4:37 |
| 2. | "Mean Bone" (from Ain't Life Grand) | Slash, Johnny Griparic, Rod Jackson, Matt Laug, Ryan Roxie, Jack Douglas | 4:06 |
| 3. | "Nightrain" (from Appetite for Destruction) | Axl Rose, Slash, Izzy Stradlin, Duff McKagan, Steven Adler | 5:34 |
| 4. | "Dirty Little Thing" (from Contraband) | Scott Weiland, Slash, McKagan, Matt Sorum, Dave Kushner, Keith Nelson | 4:59 |
| 5. | "Back from Cali" (from Slash) | Slash, Myles Kennedy | 4:02 |
| 6. | "Beggars & Hangers-on" (from It's Five O'Clock Somewhere) | Slash, Eric Dover, McKagan | 6:56 |
| 7. | "Civil War" (from Use Your Illusion II) | Rose, Slash, McKagan | 8:16 |
| 8. | "Rocket Queen" (from Appetite for Destruction) | Rose, Slash, Stradlin, McKagan, Adler | 6:45 |
| 9. | "Fall to Pieces" (from Contraband) | Weiland, Slash, McKagan, Sorum, Kushner | 4:58 |
| 10. | "Sucker Train Blues" (from Contraband) | Weiland, Slash, McKagan, Sorum, Kushner | 5:58 |
| 11. | "Nothing to Say" (from Slash) | Slash, M. Shadows | 7:50 |
| 12. | "Starlight" (from Slash) | Slash, Kennedy | 6:00 |

Disc two
| No. | Title | Writer(s) | Length |
|---|---|---|---|
| 1. | "Watch This" (from Slash) | Slash | 4:09 |
| 2. | "Godfather" | Larry Kusik, Nino Rota | 10:46 |
| 3. | "Sweet Child o' Mine" (from Appetite for Destruction) | Rose, Slash, Stradlin | 6:45 |
| 4. | "Rise Today" (Alter Bridge cover) | Kennedy, Brian Marshall, Mark Tremonti, Scott Phillips | 4:12 |
| 5. | "Slither" (from Contraband) | Weiland, Slash, McKagan, Sorum, Kushner | 10:23 |
| 6. | "Communication Breakdown" (Led Zeppelin cover) | John Bonham, John Paul Jones, Jimmy Page | 3:38 |
| 7. | "Paradise City" (from Appetite for Destruction) | Rose, Slash, Stradlin, McKagan, Adler | 10:48 |

== Personnel ==
Slash

- Slash – lead guitar, slide guitar, backing vocals
- Myles Kennedy – lead vocals
- Bobby Schneck – rhythm guitar
- Todd Kerns – bass, backing vocals
- Brent Fitz – drums

Abbey Road Live

- Paul Nickson – recording, mixing

Additional personnel

- Caitlin Cresswell
- Dan Hardingham
- Holly Johnsen
- Louise Downer
- Margot Meyer
- MJ
- Noggin
- Rizzo
- Zach Bair
