= Living the Dream (Slash album) =

2018 studio album by Slash featuring Myles Kennedy and the Conspirators

Studio album by Slash featuring Myles Kennedy and the Conspirators
- Released: September 21, 2018
- Recorded: January–May 2018
- Studios: Snakepit Studios and NRG Recording
- Genre: Hard rock
- Length: 52:20
- Labels: Snakepit, Roadrunner
- Producer: Michael "Elvis" Baskette

Slash chronology
Live at the Roxy 9.25.14 (2015)	Living the Dream (2018)	Living the Dream Tour (2019)

Myles Kennedy chronology
Year of the Tiger (2018)	Living the Dream (2018)	Walk the Sky (2019)

Singles from Living the Dream
- 1. "Driving Rain" Released: July 25, 2018; 2. "Mind Your Manners" Released: August 17, 2018; 3. "My Antidote" Released: September 17, 2018; 4. "Boulevard of Broken Hearts" Released: May 7, 2019

Living the Dream is the fourth solo album by guitarist Slash and the third to feature Myles Kennedy and the Conspirators. It was released on September 21, 2018, on Slash's own record label Snakepit Records. The album was produced by Michael Baskette, who also produced the previous record World on Fire.

== Background and recording ==
After reuniting with Guns N' Roses in 2016, the possibility of a third record for Slash and Myles Kennedy and the Conspirators was in question, let alone if they would stay together. Slash stated in multiple interviews, including on Eddie Trunk's show, that he would like to make the next album as he is always writing riffs, and had some written already but had to find time on the Guns N' Roses tour; the record was completed on the tour.

He later appeared a second time on Trunk's podcast to talk further on an array of subjects including travel, doing press, and the new record, which he started jamming in 2015 and picked back up in 2017.

Some thought the album title Living the Dream was in reference to Slash "living the dream", but Slash clarified: "Well, you know, the album title is actually meant to be a sarcastic statement about the world we're living in at the moment [...] it was just something that came to mind—this tongue-in-cheek thing directed at social political events across the globe."

== Reception ==
Professional ratings
Aggregate scores
Source	Rating
Metacritic	69/100
Review scores
Source	Rating
AllMusic	3.5/5 stars
Kerrang!	(Positive)
Classic Rock	4/5 stars
The Guardian	3/5 stars
Rolling Stone	2.5/5 stars

Living the Dream has received mostly positive reviews from online and magazine sources. According to AllMusic, it is the first positive review to receive three and a half stars out of five stars stating, "This is the sound of a working band locking in on their groove." The album sold around 20,000 copies in its first week and debuted at No. 27 on the Billboard 200.

== Music and lyrics ==
This was the first record in which Frank Sidoris played rhythm guitar—on Apocalyptic Love Myles Kennedy played rhythm guitar and on World on Fire Slash played all guitars. Slash on the dynamic of the band: "It's been an amazing ride so far; as a band we continue to get better, which is great. With the addition of Frank [Sidoris on guitar] since the World on Fire tour, I feel we have hit a creative stride." It is also the first recorded digitally because tape recording has become expensive.

When interviewed by The Classic Metal Show about continuity between this record, singer Myles Kennedy explained: "Yeah, it definitely has those sonic hallmarks, I think, that started to evolve. [...] It's 12 songs, and there aren't a lot of epic journeys [...] these are very concise, and there's an uptempo quality to a lot of the tracks that I think bode well for this band."

Slash also commented on the musical direction by saying: "It's a natural progression from World On Fire [...] I think it has a little more diversity—some of the ideas are not really what I would consider to be predictable. At the same time, the record is also a bit more structured, with songs that are shorter and more to the point than last time..... "It's just a snapshot of where we're at which is what we're going for with each new album — to be present in what we're doing and come up with something that is representative of and reflects this moment in time."

== Track listing ==
All tracks are written by Slash and Myles Kennedy.

No.	Title	Length
1.	"The Call of the Wild"	3:59
2.	"Serve You Right"	5:12
3.	"My Antidote"	4:17
4.	"Mind Your Manners"	3:38
5.	"Lost Inside the Girl"	6:30
6.	"Read Between the Lines"	3:37
7.	"Slow Grind"	3:35
8.	"The One You Loved Is Gone"	4:50
9.	"Driving Rain"	4:10
10.	"Sugar Cane"	3:09
11.	"The Great Pretender"	5:25
12.	"Boulevard of Broken Hearts"	4:06
Total length:		52:20

== Personnel ==
Slash featuring Myles Kennedy and the Conspirators

- Slash – lead guitar, acoustic guitar
- Myles Kennedy – lead vocals
- Todd Kerns – bass guitar, backing vocals
- Brent Fitz – drums, percussion, keyboards
- Frank Sidoris – rhythm guitar

Production

- Michael "Elvis" Baskette – production, mixing, engineering
- Ron English – artwork
- Ted Jensen – mastering

== Charts ==
Chart (2018)	Peak position
Australian Albums (ARIA)	4
Austrian Albums (Ö3 Austria)	2
Belgian Albums (Ultratop Flanders)	20
Belgian Albums (Ultratop Wallonia)	15
Canadian Albums (Billboard)	36
Czech Albums (ČNS IFPI)	10
Dutch Albums (Album Top 100)	21
Finnish Albums (Suomen virallinen lista)	21
German Albums (Offizielle Top 100)	6
Hungarian Albums (MAHASZ)	2
Irish Albums (IRMA)	28
Italian Albums (FIMI)	3
New Zealand Albums (RMNZ)	15
Norwegian Albums (VG-lista)	26
Polish Albums (ZPAV)	9
Portuguese Albums (AFP)	16
Scottish Albums (Official Charts)	1
Spanish Albums (Promusicae)	6
Swedish Albums (Sverigetopplistan)	4
Swiss Albums (Schweizer Hitparade)	1
UK Albums (Official Charts)	4
UK Rock & Metal Albums (Official Charts)	1
US Billboard 200	27
US Top Hard Rock Albums (Billboard)	1
US Top Rock Albums (Billboard)	3
