= Made in Stoke 24/7/11 =

Live album by Slash featuring Myles Kennedy
- Released: 14 November 2011
- Recorded: 24 July 2011 at the Victoria Hall, Stoke-on-Trent, England
- Genre: Hard rock, heavy metal
- Length: 112:11
- Label: Eagle Rock Entertainment
- Producer: Audrey Davenport

Slash chronology
Live in Manchester (2010)	Made in Stoke 24/7/11 (2011)	Apocalyptic Love (2012)

Myles Kennedy chronology
AB III (2010)	Made in Stoke 24/7/11 (2011)	Live at Wembley (2012)

Video cover

Slash video chronology
Made in Stoke 24/7/11 (2011)	Live at the Roxy 9.25.14 (2015)

Myles Kennedy video chronology
Live from Amsterdam (2009)	Made in Stoke 24/7/11 (2011)	Live at Wembley (2012)

Made in Stoke 24/7/11
Review scores
Source	Rating
AllMusic	2.5/5 stars

Made in Stoke 24/7/11 is the second live album by British-American hard rock guitarist Slash. Featuring American vocalist Myles Kennedy, the album was recorded on Slash's debut solo tour in Stoke-on-Trent, where he had spent his early years. It was captured at the 1500 capacity Victoria Hall on 24 July 2011 and released by Armoury Records, a division of Eagle Rock Entertainment, on 14 November 2011 as a live album and DVD/Blu-ray, featuring 5.1-channel surround sound. As well as songs from Slash's self-titled debut album, Made in Stoke also includes songs originally performed by the guitarist's previous bands Guns N' Roses, Slash's Snakepit and Velvet Revolver.

== Track listing ==
No.	Title	Writer(s)	Length
1.	"Been There Lately" (Slash's Snakepit)	Slash, Rod Jackson, Ryan Roxie, Johnny Griparic, Matt Laug	4:34
2.	"Nightrain" (Guns N' Roses)	Axl Rose, Slash, Izzy Stradlin, Duff McKagan, Steven Adler	5:02
3.	"Ghost"	Slash, Ian Astbury	3:43
4.	"Mean Bone" (Slash's Snakepit)	Slash, Jackson, Roxie, Griparic, Laug, Jack Douglas	4:01
5.	"Back from Cali"	Slash, Myles Kennedy	3:36
6.	"Rocket Queen" (Guns N' Roses)	Rose, Slash, Stradlin, McKagan, Adler	9:21
7.	"Civil War" (Guns N' Roses)	Rose, Slash, McKagan	8:06
8.	"Nothing to Say"	Slash, M. Shadows	7:27
9.	"Starlight"	Slash, Kennedy	5:45
10.	"Promise"	Slash, Chris Cornell	3:59
11.	"Doctor Alibi"	Slash, Ian "Lemmy" Kilmister	3:45
12.	"Speed Parade" (Slash's Snakepit)	Slash, Jackson, Roxie, Griparic, Laug	3:58
13.	"Watch This"	Slash	3:39
14.	"Beggars & Hangers-On" (Slash's Snakepit)	Slash, Eric Dover, McKagan	6:29
15.	"Patience" (Guns N' Roses)	Rose, Slash, Stradlin, McKagan, Adler	5:45
16.	"Godfather Solo" (theme from The Godfather)	Nino Rota	10:31
17.	"Sweet Child o' Mine" (Guns N' Roses)	Rose, Slash, Stradlin, McKagan, Adler	6:28
18.	"Slither" (Velvet Revolver)	Scott Weiland, Slash, McKagan, Matt Sorum, Dave Kushner	7:34
19.	"By the Sword"	Slash, Andrew Stockdale	4:36
20.	"Mr. Brownstone" (Guns N' Roses)	Rose, Slash, Stradlin, McKagan, Adler	4:41
21.	"Paradise City" (Guns N' Roses)	Rose, Slash, Stradlin, McKagan, Adler	9:13
22.	"Interview with Slash"		23:45
23.	"Interview with Myles"		13:19
24.	"Interview with Uncle Ian"		7:39
Total length:			112:11

== Personnel ==
=== Musicians ===
- Slash – lead guitar, slide guitar on "Rocket Queen" and "Beggars and Hangers-On."
- Myles Kennedy – lead vocals, rhythm guitar on "Nothing to Say" and "Watch This"
- Bobby Schneck – rhythm guitar, backing vocals
- Todd Kerns – bass, backing vocals, lead vocals on "Doctor Alibi"
- Brent Fitz – drums, backing vocals

=== Additional personnel ===
- Audrey Davenport – production
- Eric Valentine – mixing, mastering
- Matt Friedman – production assistance
- Ian Dyckhoff – engineering
- Cian Riordan – mixing assistance
- Ian Van Der Molen – mixing assistance

== Charts ==
Chart (2011)	Peak position
Austrian Albums (Ö3 Austria)	74
German Albums (Offizielle Top 100)	40
Italian Albums (FIMI)	56
Swiss Albums (Schweizer Hitparade)	80
UK Independent Albums (OCC)	14
UK Rock & Metal Albums (OCC)	4
US Billboard 200	194
US Independent Albums (Billboard)	29
US Top Hard Rock Albums (Billboard)	8
US Top Rock Albums (Billboard)	33
