= Love Theme from The Godfather =

- US single for the instrumental film version

Single by Nino Rota (music) and Carlo Savina (conductor)

from the album The Godfather
- B-side: "The Godfather Waltz (Main Title)"
- Released: 1972
- Length: 2:37
- Label: Paramount
- Composer: Nino Rota

"Love Theme from The Godfather" is an instrumental theme from the 1972 film The Godfather, composed by Nino Rota. The piece was lyricized in English by Larry Kusik into "Speak Softly, Love", a popular song released in 1972. The highest-charting rendition of either version was by vocalist Andy Williams, who took "Speak Softly Love" to number 34 on Billboard magazine's Hot 100 and number seven on its Easy Listening chart.

== Background ==
Love Theme from The Godfather
The famous theme, composed by Nino Rota

Larry Kusik wrote the original, English lyrics, and Nino Rota composed the score. A previous version of the theme had been used in the 1958 Italian film Fortunella. Different sets of lyrics for the song have been written in French (Parle plus bas), Italian (Parla più piano), Portuguese (Fale baixinho), Sicilian (Brucia la terra), and Spanish (Amor háblame dulcemente, El milagro de tu amor). Dalida sings the French version; the Sicilian version is sung by Anthony Corleone (Franc D'Ambrosio) in The Godfather Part III. It was first heard in America in 1969 on The Merv Griffin Show sung by Angela Bacari in English and Italian.

== Awards ==
Rota's score for The Godfather was nominated for a 1973 Academy Award for Best Original Score. However, it was disqualified from consideration when the academy learned Rota had used a more comedic version of the song for the film Fortunella (1958). The disqualification was under a rule that excluded "scores diluted by the use of tracked themes or other pre-existing music". Nonetheless, Rota's score for The Godfather Part II won the 1974 Academy Award for Best Score, despite the fact that it contained the same piece.

== Chart performance ==
The first version of the song to reach any of the charts in Billboard magazine was "Love Theme from The Godfather" by pianist Roger Williams. His instrumental recording debuted in the issue dated 1 April 1972, and "bubbled under" the Hot 100 for five weeks, peaking at number 116, and another piano rendition by Ferrante and Teicher got as high as number 28 Easy Listening during its four-week chart run that began in the 8 April issue. The version that the film's music director, Carlo Savina, and his orchestra recorded for the soundtrack first charted on the Hot 100 in the 22 April issue and made it to number 66 during a nine-week chart run. It also reached number 24 on the Easy Listening chart during its three weeks there that began in the 20 May issue.

== Charts (Love Theme) ==
Weekly charts for the film version, conducted by Carlo Savina
Chart (1972)	Peak position
U.S. Billboard Hot 100	66
U.S. Billboard Easy Listening	24

Weekly charts for the Roger Williams version
Chart (1972)	Peak position
U.S. Billboard Hot 100	116

Weekly charts for the Ferrante and Teicher version
Chart (1972)	Peak position
US Billboard Easy Listening	28

== "Speak Softly Love" ==
"Love Theme from The Godfather (Speak Softly, Love)"
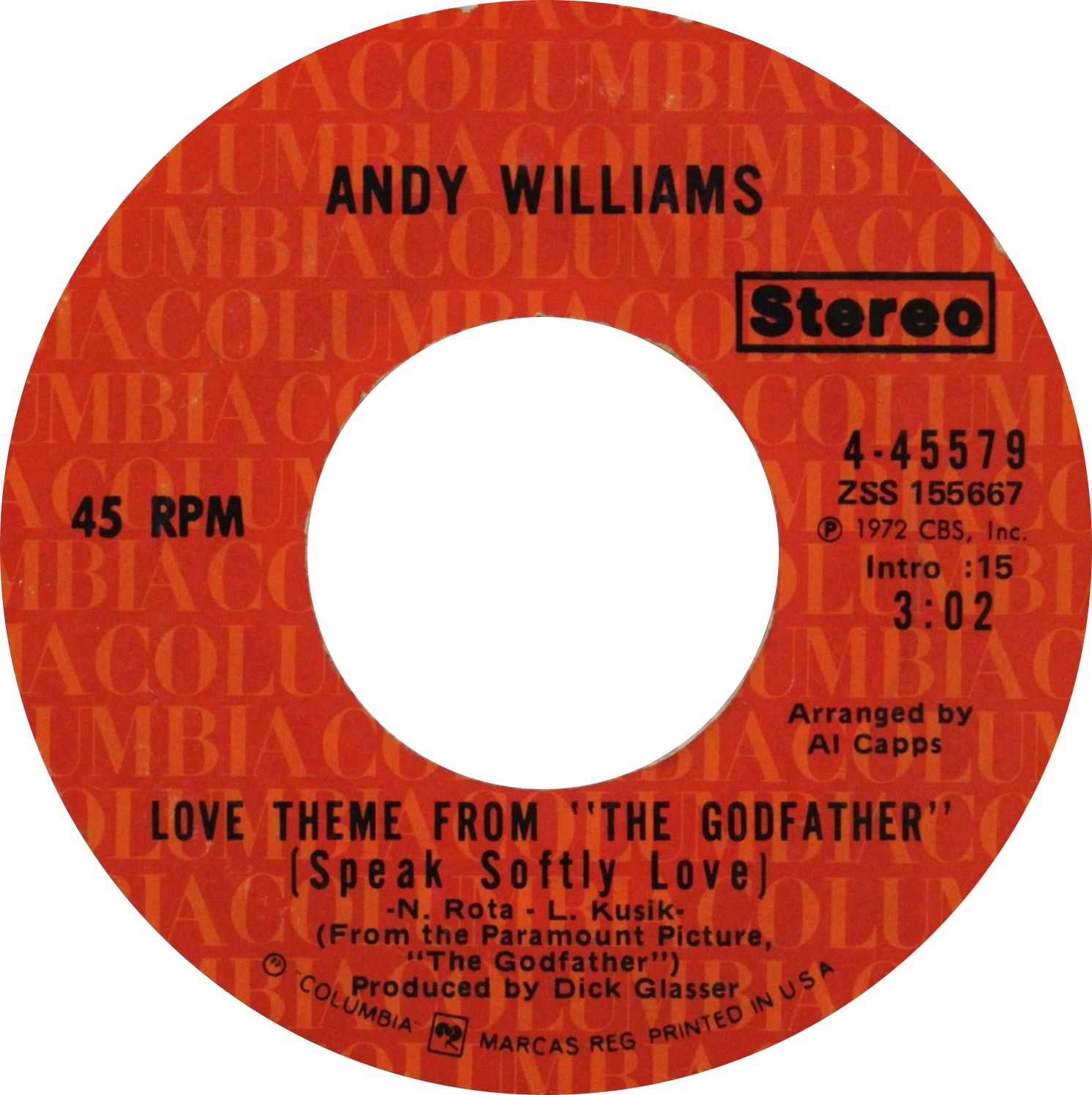
- One of side-A labels of the US single

Single by Andy Williams

from the album Love Theme from "The Godfather"
- B-side: "Home for Thee"
- Released: April 1972
- Recorded: 18 February 1972
- Genre: Pop, easy listening, soft rock
- Length: 2:41
- Label: Columbia
- Songwriters: Larry Kusik, Nino Rota
- Producer: Dick Glasser

Andy Williams singles chronology
"Music from Across the Way" (1972)	"Love Theme from The Godfather (Speak Softly, Love)" (1972)	"MacArthur Park" (1972)

Audio
- "Speak Softly Love" by Andy Williams on YouTube

The Andy Williams version of "Speak Softly Love" also made its first appearance in the 8 April issue and reached number 34 on the Hot 100 during its 11 weeks there and number seven Easy Listening over the course of 12 weeks. A recording of the song by Al Martino debuted on both of those charts in the 29 April issue and peaked at number 80 during its four weeks on the Hot 100 and number 24 on the Easy Listening chart, where it also spent four weeks.

In the UK Williams began a run of nine weeks on 5 August of that year that led to a number 42 showing. In Spain, his version was a number-one hit, staying at the top of the charts for 15 weeks.

=== Charts (Speak Softly Love) ===
Weekly charts for the Andy Williams version
Chart (1972)	Peak position
Spain (AFYVE)	1
U.S. Billboard Hot 100	34
U.S. Billboard Adult Contemporary	7
UK Singles Chart	42

Weekly charts for the Al Martino version
Chart (1972)	Peak position
U.S. Billboard Hot 100	80
U.S. Billboard Easy Listening	24

== Recordings ==
- Slash of Guns N' Roses began performing instrumental guitar versions of the song as early as the late 1980s. The song is often referred to as "The Godfather Theme" and is included on his 2010 live album Live in Manchester and his 2011 live album Made in Stoke. A studio recording exists and was recorded for a rare 2002 soundtrack titled The Kid Stays in the Picture.
- A Ukrainian version, "Skazhy shcho liubysh" (Ukrainian: Скажи, що любиш; lit. Say what you love) was performed by Sofia Rotaru in the musical film Song Is Always with Us (1975), as the Soviet administration did not allow her to record an English cover of The Godfather's theme following an offer from Ariola Records.
- James Booker included an instrumental version of the song on his album Classified.
- Jason Kouchak sang the original Italian version Parla più piano as a tribute.
- Paul Mauriat's rendition was used as the theme music in the Soviet short animated film Contact (1978), where the melody acts as a central plot device.
- Bay Area rapper Mac Dre sampled the theme in his hip-hop song "Mafioso" from his album, Al Boo Boo (2003).
- Hip-hop artist RZA of Wu-Tang Clan samples the theme in "Black Mozart" on Raekwon's album Only Built 4 Cuban Linx... Pt. II (2009).
- A heavy metal cover of the song was done by the band Fantômas on their album The Director's Cut in 2001.
- Andrea Bocelli recorded the Sicilian version for his 2015 album Cinema.
- Gianni Morandi performs a version of song in Italian.
- Italian-French singer Dalida performed a French version of the song written by Boris Bergman in her 1972 album Il faut du temps.
- The Latino-Mediterranean band French Latino also performed the French version. in their album Guarda la esperanza.
- German singer Udo Lindenberg recorded a version with new German lyrics as the closing title track for his 2016 album Stärker als die Zeit.
- Japanese singer Kiyohiko Ozaki recorded a cover with Japanese lyrics on his 1972 album Kieyo'72.
- Jamaican artist Ken Boothe covered the song on his 1974 album "Everything I Own (album)".
- Finnish singer Fredi recorded a version "Puhu hiljaa rakkaudesta" with Finnish lyrics by Vexi Salmi in 1972.
- Venezuelan singer Rudy Márquez recorded a self-adapted Spanish version, on his 1972 album Háblame Suavemente.
- American singer Scott Walker covered the song on his 1972 album "The Moviegoer".
- Hungarian singer Korda György released his version called Gyöngéden with Hungarian lyrics by Zsuzsa Váradi on his 1974 album Mondd, Hogy Szép Volt Az Este.
- English opera singer Jonathan Antoine covered the song on his 2014 album "Tenore".

The Whispers Speak Softly Love (Love Theme From "The Godfather") The Whispers cover of Andy Williams's 'Love Theme From the Godfather (Speak Softly Love) from their 1972 Janus Records album Life and breath .

== See also ==
- "Promise Me You'll Remember (Love Theme from The Godfather Part III)"

== Bibliography ==
- Whitburn, Joel (2007), Joel Whitburn Presents Billboard Top Adult Songs, 1961-2006, Record Research Inc., ISBN 978-0898201697
- Whitburn, Joel (2009), Joel Whitburn's Top Pop Singles, 1955-2008, Record Research Inc., ISBN 978-0898201802
