= Live at the Roxy 9.25.14 =

2015 live album by Slash

Live album by Slash featuring Myles Kennedy and The Conspirators
- Released: June 15, 2015
- Recorded: September 25, 2014 at the Roxy Theatre (West Hollywood, California)
- Genres: Hard rock; heavy metal
- Length: 110:20
- Label: Eagle Rock Entertainment

Slash featuring Myles Kennedy and The Conspirators chronology
World on Fire (2014)	Live at the Roxy 9.25.14 (2015)	Living the Dream (2018)

Live at the Roxy 9.25.14

Video by Slash featuring Myles Kennedy and The Conspirators
- Released: 2015
- Length: 103:56
- Label: Eagle Rock/Universal
- Directors: Derek Manning; Bart Peters
- Producers: John Foy; Shane Elrod; Marty Witt

Slash featuring Myles Kennedy and The Conspirators video chronology
Made in Stoke 24/7/11 (2011)	Live at the Roxy 9.25.14 (2015)	Living the Dream Tour (2019)

Live at the Roxy 9.25.14 (or Live at the Roxy 25.9.14 outside the United States) is a live album and DVD by English–American guitarist Slash, featuring vocalist Myles Kennedy and backing band The Conspirators (bassist Todd Kerns, drummer Brent Fitz and rhythm guitarist Frank Sidoris).

Recorded at the Roxy Theatre in West Hollywood, California on September 25, 2014, it was released on June 15, 2015 by Armoury Records (album) and Eagle Rock Entertainment (DVD). The latter, said Slash, "really captures the energy and the chaos that comes with that gritty kind of gig."

== Background ==
The album's release date, artwork and track listing were announced in March 2015. The album documents one of the first live shows following the release of the collaborative's second studio album, World on Fire. It features songs from throughout Slash's career, including all three of his solo albums and hits originally by Guns N' Roses and Velvet Revolver.

== Promotion and release ==
Two weeks before the album's release, a live video "World on Fire" was released as a teaser. Live at the Roxy 9.25.14 was released in Europe on June 15, 2015 and in North America on June 16, 2015. The album was released as a double CD and a triple vinyl LP, while the video was released on DVD and Blu-ray, featuring 5.1-channel surround sound. Both were also released as digital downloads.

== Track listings ==
=== Live album ===
Disc one
No.	Title	Writer(s)	Length
1.	"Ghost" (originally performed by Slash featuring Ian Astbury)	Saul Hudson; Astbury	3:47
2.	"Nightrain" (originally performed by Guns N' Roses)	Axl Rose; Hudson; Izzy Stradlin; Duff McKagan; Steven Adler	5:01
3.	"Halo"	Hudson; Myles Kennedy	3:16
4.	"Back from Cali"	Hudson; Kennedy	3:52
5.	"Stone Blind"	Hudson; Kennedy	3:44
6.	"You Could Be Mine" (originally performed by Guns N' Roses)	Stradlin; Rose	5:51
7.	"Doctor Alibi" (originally performed by Slash featuring Lemmy Kilmister)	Hudson; Kilmister	3:08
8.	"You're Crazy" (originally performed by Guns N' Roses)	Rose; Hudson; Stradlin; McKagan; Adler	3:26
9.	"Wicked Stone"	Hudson; Kennedy	6:02
10.	"30 Years to Life"	Hudson; Kennedy	5:01
11.	"Rocket Queen" (originally performed by Guns N' Roses)	Rose; Hudson; McKagan	17:40
Total length:			60:48

Disc two
No.	Title	Writer(s)	Length
1.	"Bent to Fly"	Hudson; Kennedy	5:00
2.	"Starlight"	Hudson; Kennedy	5:37
3.	"You're a Lie"	Hudson; Kennedy	3:35
4.	"World on Fire"	Hudson; Kennedy	5:02
5.	"Anastasia"	Hudson; Kennedy	6:57
6.	"Sweet Child o' Mine" (originally performed by Guns N' Roses)	Rose; Hudson; Stradlin	6:29
7.	"Slither" (originally performed by Velvet Revolver)	Scott Weiland; Hudson; McKagan; Matt Sorum; Dave Kushner	9:02
8.	"Paradise City" (originally performed by Guns N' Roses)	Rose; Hudson; Stradlin; McKagan; Adler	7:50
Total length:			49:32

=== Video ===
Main track listing
No.	Title	Writer(s)	Length
1.	"Ghost" (originally performed by Slash featuring Ian Astbury)	Hudson; Astbury	3:47
2.	"Nightrain" (originally performed by Guns N' Roses)	Rose; Hudson; Stradlin; McKagan; Adler	5:01
3.	"Back from Cali"	Hudson; Kennedy	3:52
4.	"You Could Be Mine" (originally performed by Guns N' Roses)	Stradlin; Rose	5:51
5.	"Rocket Queen" (originally performed by Guns N' Roses)	Rose; Hudson; McKagan	17:40
6.	"Bent to Fly"	Hudson; Kennedy	5:00
7.	"Starlight"	Hudson; Kennedy	5:37
8.	"You're a Lie"	Hudson; Kennedy	3:35
9.	"World on Fire"	Hudson; Kennedy	5:02
10.	"Anastasia"	Hudson; Kennedy	6:57
11.	"Sweet Child o' Mine" (originally performed by Guns N' Roses)	Rose; Hudson; Stradlin; McKagan; Adler	6:29
12.	"Slither" (originally performed by Velvet Revolver)	Weiland; Hudson; McKagan; Sorum; Kushner	9:02
13.	"Paradise City" (originally performed by Guns N' Roses)	Rose; Hudson; Stradlin; McKagan; Adler	7:50
Total length:			85:43

Bonus Tracks
No.	Title	Writer(s)	Length
1.	"Stone Blind"	Hudson; Kennedy	3:44
2.	"You're Crazy" (originally performed by Guns N' Roses)	Rose; Hudson; Stradlin; McKagan; Adler	3:26
3.	"Wicked Stone"	Hudson; Kennedy	6:02
4.	"30 Years to Life"	Hudson; Kennedy	5:01
Total length:			18:13

Japanese Edition
No.	Title	Writer(s)	Length
5.	"Halo"	Hudson; Kennedy	3:16
6.	"Doctor Alibi" (originally performed by Slash featuring Lemmy Kilmister)	Hudson; Kilmister	3:08
Total length:			24:37

== Personnel ==
- Slash – lead guitar, slide guitar, acoustic guitar, backing vocals
- Myles Kennedy – lead vocals, rhythm guitar
- Frank Sidoris – rhythm guitar, backing vocals
- Todd Kerns – bass, lead vocals, backing vocals
- Brent Fitz – drums, backing vocals

Production

- Chad Bamford – mixing
- Mazen Murad – mastering

== Reception ==
Live at the Roxy 9.25.14
Review scores
Source	Rating
AllMusic	3/5 stars

== Charts ==
Chart (2015)	Peak position
Austrian Albums (Ö3 Austria)	69
Belgian Albums (Ultratop Flanders)	79
Belgian Music DVD (Ultratop Flanders)	8
Belgian Albums (Ultratop Wallonia)	161
Belgian Music DVD (Ultratop Wallonia)	5
Dutch Music DVD (MegaCharts)	3
French Music DVD (SNEP)	27
German Albums (Offizielle Top 100)	29
Hungarian Albums (MAHASZ)	37
Italian Music DVD (FIMI)	4
Scottish Albums (Official Charts)	41
Swiss Albums (Schweizer Hitparade)	60
UK Albums (Official Charts)	57
UK Rock & Metal Albums (Official Charts)	4
UK Music Videos (Official Charts)	1
US Top Rock Albums (Billboard)	43
US Top Hard Rock Albums (Billboard)	11
US Music Video Sales (Billboard)	1
Chart (2020)	Peak position
Polish Albums (ZPAV)	50
