= Year of the Tiger (Myles Kennedy album) =

2018 studio album by Myles Kennedy

Studio album by Myles Kennedy
- Released: March 9, 2018
- Studio: Studio Barbarosa (Orlando, Florida)
- Length: 50:40
- Label: Napalm
- Producer: Michael "Elvis" Baskette

Myles Kennedy chronology
Live at the Roxy 9.25.14 (2015)	Year of the Tiger (2018)	Living the Dream (2018)

Year of the Tiger is the debut studio album by American musician and singer-songwriter Myles Kennedy. His first release as a solo artist, it was released on March 9, 2018, by Napalm Records. The album is a musical departure from the hard rock music of Kennedy's other projects, instead featuring a stripped-back blues-based sound. A concept album, it explores the death of Kennedy's father in 1974, the year of the Tiger in the Chinese calendar.

== Critical reception ==
Professional ratings
Review scores
Source	Rating
The Arts Desk	3/5 stars
Classic Rock	4/5 stars
Cryptic Rock	5/5 stars
Daily Express	5/5 stars
Metal Hammer	4/5 stars
The Spill Magazine	5/5 stars

Initial reaction for Year of the Tiger from music critics has been highly favorable. Hannah May Kilroy of Classic Rock gave the album 4 out of 5 stars, writing, "essentially Year of the Tiger sounds like Alter Bridge relocated to the deep south—if they swapped their hard rock riffs for bluesy twangs" and "the final message is one of finding hope in the darkness, and it’s evident that making Year of the Tiger has been a therapeutic experience for Kennedy and should be celebrated." Cryptic Rock's Vito Lanzi gave the album a perfect 5-star rating, and commented that "with Year of the Tiger, Kennedy has really found his own individuality as a musician and is proud of his accomplishments." Daily Express writer Paul Davies was also positive towards the album, concluding that "As though created from the confessional booth of inward reflection and conveyed with brutal honesty, Kennedy gloriously rides the tiger across all the tracks with emotional and musical aplomb."

Loudwire's Chad Childers described the album as "not a Slash rehash or Alter Bridge minus Mark Tremonti" but as "a stellar, more nuanced and autobiographical release that shows the singer as an artist taking a risk, being his most vulnerable while telling a deeply personal tale of a tragedy from his youth that influenced and informed the rest of his life." Childers concluded that "While the album is about Kennedy's journey, it's one that is satisfying to us as listeners." In 2024, the magazine elected it as the best hard rock album of 2018.

The Arts Desk's Russ Coffey was more critical of the album, giving it a three out of five stars, adding up that "there are plenty for whom this kind of folky hard rock is the absolute last word in ghastliness. But if you're a classic rock fan and you enjoy Kennedy's voice, you're unlikely to be disappointed with Year of the Tiger."

== Track listing ==
All tracks are written by Myles Kennedy.

No.	Title	Length
1.	"Year of the Tiger"	3:40
2.	"The Great Beyond"	4:50
3.	"Blind Faith"	4:29
4.	"Devil on the Wall"	3:44
5.	"Ghost of Shangri La"	3:32
6.	"Turning Stones"	3:38
7.	"Haunted by Design"	3:39
8.	"Mother"	3:42
9.	"Nothing but a Name"	5:00
10.	"Love Can Only Heal"	5:32
11.	"Songbird"	4:04
12.	"One Fine Day"	4:50
Total length:		50:40

Best Buy exclusive edition and Japan bonus tracks
No.	Title	Length
13.	"Nothing but a Name" (demo acoustic version)	4:51
14.	"The Great Beyond" (demo acoustic version)	4:45
15.	"Haunted by Design" (demo acoustic version)	3:46
Total length:		64:07

Limited digipack edition
No.	Title	Length
13.	"Year of the Tiger" (demo acoustic version)	3:40
14.	"Blind Faith" (demo acoustic version)	4:15
15.	"One Fine Day" (demo acoustic version)	4:42
16.	"Songbird" (demo acoustic version)	4:01
17.	"Turning Stones" (demo acoustic version)	3:38
18.	"Ghost of Shangri-La" (demo acoustic version)	3:36
Total length:		23:51

== Personnel ==
Taken from album liner notes.

- Myles Kennedy – vocals, guitar, banjo, lap steel, bass guitar, mandolin
- Zia Uddin – drums, percussion
- Tim Tournier – bass guitar
- Michael "Elvis" Baskette – keyboards, producer, mixing
- Jef Moll – engineering, digital editing
- Brad Blackwood – mastering
- Simon Dobson – string arrangement ("The Great Beyond")
- Will Harvey – violin ("The Great Beyond")
- Maddie Cutter – cello ("The Great Beyond")
- Elitsa Bogdanova – viola ("The Great Beyond")

== Charts ==
Chart (2018)	Peak position
Australian Albums (ARIA)	85
Austrian Albums (Ö3 Austria)	10
Belgian Albums (Ultratop Flanders)	64
Belgian Albums (Ultratop Wallonia)	122
Dutch Albums (Album Top 100)	48
German Albums (Offizielle Top 100)	14
Irish Albums (IRMA)	16
Italian Albums (FIMI)	40
Japanese Albums (Oricon)	200
New Zealand Heatseeker Albums (RMNZ)	9
Polish Albums (ZPAV)	34
Scottish Albums (OCC)	6
Swiss Albums (Schweizer Hitparade)	12
UK Albums (OCC)	12
US Billboard 200	63
US Top Rock Albums (Billboard)	11
