= You're a Lie =

Single by Slash featuring Myles Kennedy and the Conspirators

from the album Apocalyptic Love
- Released: February 27, 2012
- Genre: Hard rock
- Length: 3:50
- Label: Dik Hayd International
- Songwriters: Slash and Myles Kennedy
- Producer: Eric Valentine

Slash singles chronology
"Ghost" (2010)	"You're a Lie" (2012)	"Standing in the Sun" (2012)

Myles Kennedy singles chronology
"Back from Cali" (2010)	"You're a Lie" (2012)	"Standing in the Sun" (2012)

Music video
- "You're a Lie" on YouTube

"You're a Lie" is a song by Slash featuring Myles Kennedy and the Conspirators. It is the lead single from Slash's 2012 album, Apocalyptic Love. The song peaked at No. 1 on the Canadian Active Rock chart for five weeks straight.

== Reception ==
The song has received mixed reviews from critics. Will Hermes of Rolling Stone gave the song a rating of 2 1/2 out of 5 stars. Amy Sciarretto of Loudwire gave the song a 4 out of 5 rating, describing the song as "a rowdy, bluesy rocker, anchored by Slash’s signature riffing and style." The song was listed on Loudwire's 66 Best Hard Rock Songs of the 21st Century.

== Charts ==
=== Weekly charts ===
Weekly chart performance for "You're a Lie"
Chart (2012)	Peak position
Canada Hot 100 (Billboard)	80
Canada Rock (Billboard)	1
US Hot Rock & Alternative Songs (Billboard)	12

=== Year-end charts ===
Year-end chart performance for "You're a Lie"
Chart (2012)	Position
US Hot Rock Songs (Billboard)	43

== Personnel ==
- Slash – lead guitar
- Myles Kennedy – lead vocals, rhythm guitar
- Todd Kerns – bass, screams
- Brent Fitz – drums
