= Five Foot Thick =

American metal band

- Origin: Spokane, Washington, United States
- Genres: Nu metal
- Years active: 1997–2006
- Label: Eclipse Records
- Members: Bryan Dilling; George Silva; Kris Demers; Silas McQuain; Matt "Gzuz" Gonzales

Five Foot Thick were an American five-piece nu metal band originating from Spokane, Washington, United States.

== History ==
Five Foot Thick was formed in the spring of 1997 by Kirt Whittle and George Silva after their return from attending the Vans Warped Tour. Both men were fans of various genres of music including hip-hop and rock, and wanted to create a band that incorporated both of those elements into the music and vocal delivery.

By late 1997, the band was rounded out by Bryan Dilling and Cale Bartlett of local favorites Morning Breath and local turntablist DJ J-ster Jazz. Five Foot Thick played their debut show opening for Hed PE and local band Felix Shmitt, which included future FFT members Matt Gonzales and Kris DeMers.

Cale Bartlett remained a member of FFT until late 1998. While recording what was intended to be a debut album at Dark Sessions Studios under the guidance of Donn Larsen, Barlett was fired from the band for unspecified reasons. Kris DeMers was asked to join in Barlett's place. DeMers made his debut with the band on New Year's Eve 1998. DJ J-ster Jazz left shortly thereafter and was replaced by Matt Van Steenwyck. With the line up solidified, FFT continued to write new material and work on its debut album.

Soon after, FFT came to the attention of local entrepreneur Shane Nowka who was the owner of a pair of skateboard and snowboard shops called Local 77. He became a fan of the band and invited them to play a boat cruise on Lake Coeur d’ Alene. The boat cruise became one of the high points in Five Foot Thick's career to that point. After the cruise Whittle was dismissed from the band he helped found. Silas McQuain was asked to replace Whittle in the band. This would complete the line up for FFT's debut album, Circles.

After the cruise Local 77 began sponsoring FFT, giving them swag to pass out at concerts, and helping promote the band in their stores. The partnership became one of the things that helped drive the band towards local success that had only been seen by acts such as Black Happy. In the winter of 1999/2000 Five Foot Thick entered Sack Lunch recording studio to create their debut album. This was made possible through financing from sponsor Local 77. Released in May 2000, Circles would go on to be one of the best selling local albums in Spokane's history. The single "All in My Head" got radio play on Rock 94.5, another unheard of accomplishment for a local band at that time. Shortly after the release of Circles the band experienced another line up change when Matt Van Steenwyck left the group. He was replaced by Matt Gonzales. It was during this period of time that the recording industry began to take notice of the band.

FFT toured behind and promote Circles for the next two years. In the spring of 2002 the band teamed up with local producer Chris White to create the follow-up to Circles, Blood Puddle. Blood Puddle was a heavier effort than Circles with engineer Brian Valentino helping guitarist Silva achieve the guitar tone that he had long been searching for. Likewise, it was at this point that the lead vocal approach began to favor more extreme screaming from Dilling, with he and DeMers teaming for the first time on lyrics. Recording for this album would take the band outside their comfort zone of Spokane, by traveling to Seattle to record at Robert Lang Studio.

Like Circles before it, Blood Puddle went on to be one of the best selling albums in local history. Released in the fall of 2002 to great local acclaim, the album's success was bolstered by a guest appearance from future Alter Bridge vocalist Myles Kennedy, who appeared on the first single, "Ducked Out". "Ducked Out" was the band's first song to reach the national airwaves.

Shortly after the release of Blood Puddle, Five Foot thick signed a recording contract with Eclipse Records, an independent label based in New Jersey. Everything was looking up for the band until tragedy struck in the early hours of September 2, 2003.

A fire decimated the rehearsal spaces of Five Foot Thick and fellow local band Clintch. Clintch lost all of their equipment while Five Foot Thick salvaged a keyboard, two bass guitars, and a speaker cabinet. The loss was devastating to both bands, neither of whom were insured. Shortly after the fire a benefit was held for the two bands by fellow musicians in the local heavy music community including the Endustry and Dead Face Down. During the recovery from the fire, FFT saw the national release of Blood Puddle by Eclipse Records, and begin writing what would be their last album, This Cold Life.

This Cold Life would, like Blood Puddle, be a heavier record than its predecessor. Abandoning any semblance of hip-hop, Five Foot Thick set out to create an album that reflected their love of heavy metal. The guitars were in full force with Silva supplying slabs of rhythm that was complimented for the first time by Matt Gonzales’ lead guitar work, while Dilling and DeMers continued their lyrical work in tandem.

This Cold Life was released in late 2005 without the aid of a record label as tensions had risen between the band and Eclipse during the recovery from the fire that had set the band so far back. It was during the recording and lead up to the release of This Cold Life that bass player Kris DeMers began experiencing health trouble related to asthma. He had left the band during the recording of the album, and returned for the release dates related to promoting it. DeMers’ health issues coupled by rising tensions within the band led the members to dissolve Five Foot Thick in early 2006, playing their last show at the Big Easy in downtown Spokane May 12 of that year.

== Current ==
- Bryan Dilling - Lead Vocals
- George Silva - Guitar, Backing Vocals
- Kris DeMers - Bass, Backing Vocals
- Silas McQuain - Drums
- Matt "Gzus" Gonzales - Turntables/Keyboard/Percussion/Guitar

=== Former ===
- Matt Vansteewyk- Turntables (1999–2000)
- Kirt Whittle- Drums (1997–1999)
- D.J. J-ster Jazz- Turntables (1997–1999)
- Cale Bartlett- Bass Guitar (1997–1998)

== Discography ==
- Circles (2000)
- Blood Puddle (2003)
- This Cold Life (2005)
