= Frank Sidoris =

American guitarist

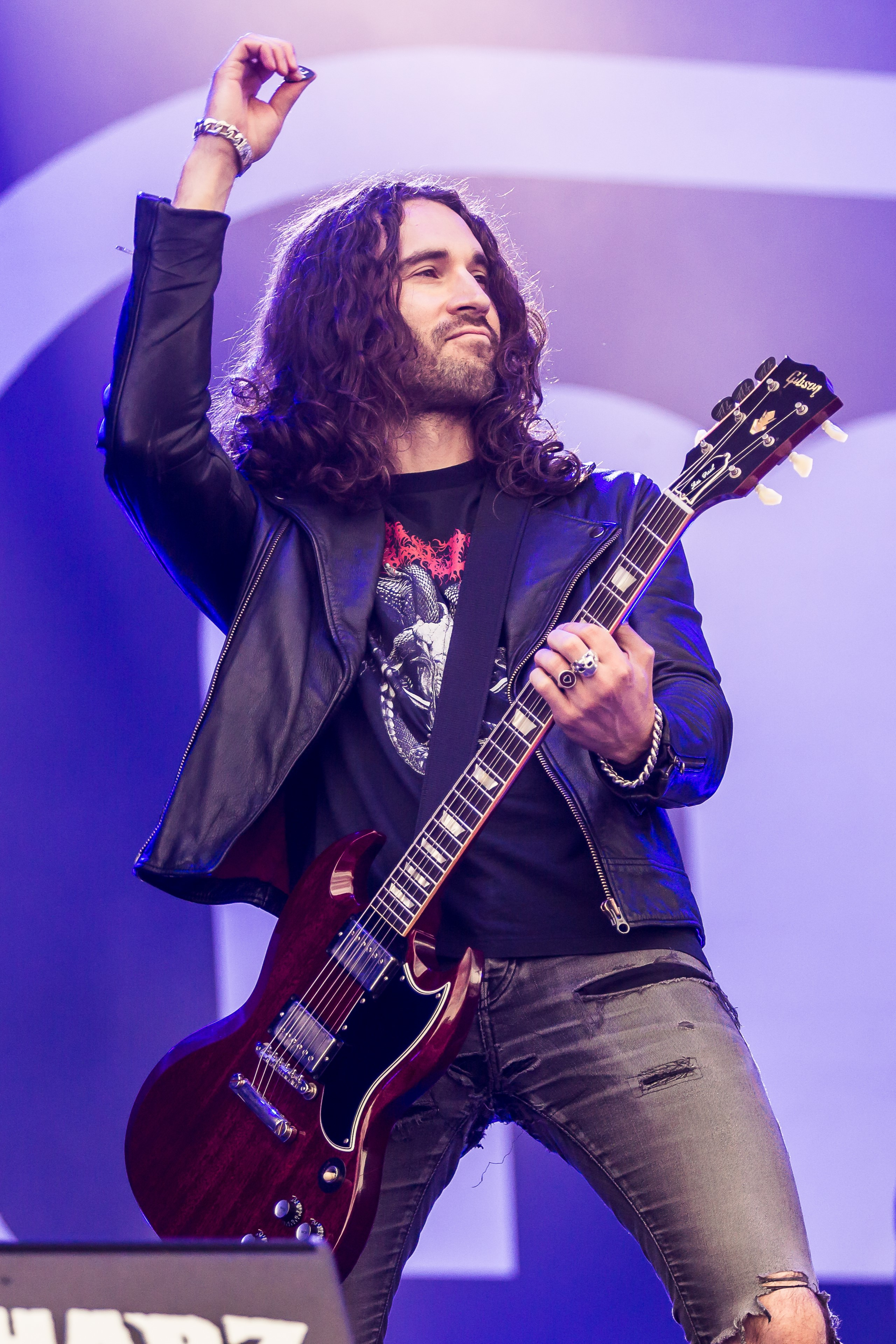
- Sidoris performing with Mammoth WVH in 2024

Background information
- Born: Las Vegas, Nevada, U.S.
- Genres: Hard rock; heavy metal
- Occupation: Guitarist
- Years active: 2010–present
- Member of: Slash; Mammoth WVH
- Formerly of: The Cab

Frank Sidoris is an American guitarist who started his professional career as a member of the rock band The Cab from August 2011 to early 2012. He left the group to join Slash's solo project band, Slash feat. Myles Kennedy and the Conspirators, as their permanent touring rhythm guitarist, in support of their albums Apocalyptic Love (2012), and World on Fire (2014). He became an official group member for the album Living the Dream (2018). He is also a touring guitarist for Wolfgang Van Halen's band Mammoth.
