= Apocalyptic Love =

2012 studio album by Slash featuring Myles Kennedy and the Conspirators

Studio album by Slash featuring Myles Kennedy and The Conspirators
- Released: May 22, 2012
- Recorded: October 8, 2011 – February 6, 2012
- Studio: Barefoot Recording Studio
- Genres: Hard rock, heavy metal
- Length: 54:20
- Label: Dik Hayd International
- Producer: Eric Valentine

Slash chronology
Made in Stoke 24/7/11 (2011)	Apocalyptic Love (2012)	World on Fire (2014)

Myles Kennedy chronology
Live at Wembley (2012)	Apocalyptic Love (2012)	Fortress (2013)

Singles from Apocalyptic Love
- 1. "You're a Lie" Released: February 28, 2012; 2. "Standing in the Sun" Released: June 2012; 3. "Bad Rain" Released: September 26, 2012; 4. "Anastasia" Released: January 22, 2013

Apocalyptic Love is the second solo studio album by guitarist Slash. However, it is also the first studio album billed to Slash feat. Myles Kennedy & The Conspirators. The band features vocalist Myles Kennedy, bassist Todd Kerns and drummer Brent Fitz in addition to Slash on guitar. Produced by Eric Valentine, it was released on May 22, 2012.

== History and recording ==
During his first solo world tour, Slash announced his second studio album. Unlike his self-titled debut solo album, which featured a variety of singers including Chris Cornell, Ozzy Osbourne, M. Shadows, and Kid Rock, he said his second album would feature Alter Bridge vocalist Myles Kennedy as the sole singer. Kennedy had previously appeared on two songs from Slash's first album, and was later the vocalist of Slash's band on tour. Slash later said that his second album would be more of a collaboration album with Kennedy, and said he was unsure whether it would be released under his own name or a new name entirely.

Slash began working on his second solo album in June 2011, and that December, three songs—"Halo", "Standing in the Sun" and "Bad Rain"—had been recorded. Slash described the new material as "very heavy". The album was finished in February 2012 and was given a May 22, 2012, release date. The first single, "You're a Lie", was released to rock radio on February 27, 2012; a 30-second preview of the song was released online with this announcement. Slash released the track listing for the album on March 5, 2012. Kennedy, who wrote the lyrics, has said that some of the lyrics on the album are about his past negative experiences with drugs.

On March 26, 30 second samples from "Apocalyptic Love" were made available on Amazon.com. It is an "internet rumor" according to Slash that the lead intro riff for "Anastasia" takes inspiration from Johann Sebastian Bach's Toccata and Fugue in D minor, which Slash interpolates live in his version of "Speak Softly Love".

== Release and reception ==
Professional ratings
Aggregate scores
Source	Rating
Metacritic	62/100
Review scores
Source	Rating
AllMusic	3/5 stars
Artistdirect	5/5 stars
The Observer	2/5 stars
Revolver	4/5 stars
Sputnikmusic	1.5/5 stars
Q	1/5 stars
Kerrang!	4/5 stars

The album debuted at number two on the Canadian Albums Chart, selling 7,500 copies. The number one album for the week was John Mayer's Born and Raised, with 17,800 copies.

The album received mixed reviews from critics. On Metacritic, it has a score of 62 out of 100, based on 13 reviews. Writing for Artistdirect, Rick Florino gave an enthusiastic review, awarding the album 5 out of 5 stars and stating that it "embodies every side of Slash", featuring "some of the man's most incendiary and infectious playing yet". He also praises Myles Kennedy's vocals and cites "Anastastia" and "Far and Away" as standout tracks, praising their orchestral and cinematic elements.

Brandon Geist of Revolver also gave a positive review of the album, giving it a 4 out of 5 rating. Geist compares the album to Slash's solo début, which he criticised for sometimes seeming "strained under the weight of its creator’s own grand ambition", whereas on Apocalyptic Love, Slash's band "let the riffs and hooks fly freely". He concludes that the album is "a collection of lean, high-octane rock-and-roll tunes".

Stephen Thomas Erlewine gave a more mixed opinion of the album in his review for AllMusic, awarding it 3 out of 5 stars. He observes that performing with Kennedy "clearly is easier on Slash's soul" compared to the vocalists in Slash's previous bands, and that the music on the album "reflects this ease". He criticises the album for containing "absolutely no surprises" but adds that it "never tries too hard, so it winds up satisfying on its own limited scale."

Another 3/5 rating came from Johan Wippsson, writing for Melodic.net, who wrote that the album "is far better" than Slash's debut, praising the decision to have Kennedy perform on all tracks, though admitting that he "had expected better songs".

== Track listing ==
All lyrics are written by Myles Kennedy; all music is composed by Slash and Kennedy (except where noted).

No.	Title	Writer(s)	Length
1.	"Apocalyptic Love"		3:28
2.	"One Last Thrill"		3:09
3.	"Standing in the Sun"		4:03
4.	"You're a Lie"		3:50
5.	"No More Heroes"	Slash; Kennedy; Eric Valentine	4:23
6.	"Halo"		3:22
7.	"We Will Roam"		4:49
8.	"Anastasia"		6:07
9.	"Not for Me"		5:21
10.	"Bad Rain"		3:46
11.	"Hard & Fast"		3:02
12.	"Far and Away"		5:14
13.	"Shots Fired"		3:48
Total length:			54:20

Deluxe edition
No.	Title	Length
14.	"Carolina"	3:17
15.	"Crazy Life"	3:40

Live at Guitar Center – Best Buy exclusive
No.	Title	Length
1.	"Beggars & Hangers-On"	7:08
2.	"Back from Cali"	3:40
3.	"Civil War"	8:37
4.	"Fall to Pieces"	4:47
5.	"Far and Away"	6:04
6.	"Not for Me"	5:32
7.	"Starlight"	6:36
8.	"Sweet Child o' Mine"	7:03

Live from New York – Best Buy exclusive bonus DVD
No.	Title	Length
1.	"Mean Bone"
2.	"Dirty Little Thing"
3.	"One Last Thrill"
4.	"Back from Cali"
5.	"Ghost"
6.	"Standing in the Sun"
7.	"Doctor Alibi"
8.	"Speed Parade"
9.	"Apocalyptic Love"
10.	"Watch This"
11.	"Starlight"
12.	"Just Like Anything"
13.	"Halo"
14.	"You're a Lie"
15.	"Slither"
16.	"By the Sword"

== Personnel ==
- Slash – lead guitar, acoustic guitar, talkbox on "Carolina"
- Myles Kennedy – lead vocals, rhythm guitar
- Todd Kerns – bass, backing vocals, screams on "You're a Lie"
- Brent Fitz – drums, electric piano
- Eric Valentine – producer, engineer, mixing
- Cian Riordan – assistant engineer
- Bradley Cook – second assistant engineer
- Trevor Whatever – guitar technician, session coordinator
- Travis Shinn – photography
- Frank Maddocks – art direction, design
- Casey Howard – cover illustration

== Miscellaneous ==
- The whole album was recorded live with analog equipment only.
- "Apocalyptic Love" is the first song that Slash and Myles Kennedy worked on together on this album.
- "Anastasia" was written from a riff Slash played on stage during the Slash 2010–11 World Tour.
- Myles Kennedy recorded some guitar blues licks for "Far and Away".
- Apocalyptic Love debuted at number 4 on the Billboard 200, selling 38,000 copies in its first week of release.
- Tracks 6 and 7 on the Live at Guitar Center CD are mislabeled on the box and on the CD sleeve as being "Starlight" and "Not for Me" respectively. The tracks are in the opposite order on the CD itself.
- The Album includes a 40-minute DVD titled "The Making of Apocalyptic Love" which explores a behind the scenes look at the Making of the Record.

== Charts ==
=== Weekly charts ===
Weekly chart performance for Apocalyptic Love
Chart (2012)	Peak position
Australian Albums (ARIA)	2
Austrian Albums (Ö3 Austria)	3
Belgian Albums (Ultratop Flanders)	13
Belgian Albums (Ultratop Wallonia)	21
Canadian Albums (Billboard)	2
Danish Albums (Hitlisten)	9
Dutch Albums (Album Top 100)	7
Finnish Albums (Suomen virallinen lista)	3
French Albums (SNEP)	9
German Albums (Offizielle Top 100)	5
Hungarian Albums (MAHASZ)	3
Iceland Albums Chart	5
Irish Albums (IRMA)	38
Italian Albums (FIMI)	3
Japanese Albums (Oricon)	13
New Zealand Albums (RMNZ)	1
Norwegian Albums (VG-lista)	13
Polish Albums (ZPAV)	5
Russian Albums Chart	16
Scottish Albums (Official Charts)	10
Spanish Albums (Promusicae)	17
Swedish Albums (Sverigetopplistan)	4
Swiss Albums (Schweizer Hitparade)	3
UK Albums (Official Charts)	12
UK Rock & Metal Albums (Official Charts)	1
US Billboard 200	4
US Independent Albums (Billboard)	1
US Top Hard Rock Albums (Billboard)	1
US Top Rock Albums (Billboard)	2
US Indie Store Album Sales (Billboard)	9

=== Year-end charts ===
Year-end chart performance for Apocalyptic Love
Chart (2012)	Position
Australian Albums (ARIA)	92
US Top Rock Albums (Billboard)	66

== Certifications ==
Certifications for Apocalyptic Love
Region	Certification	Certified units/sales
Australia (ARIA)	Gold	35,000^{^}
New Zealand (RMNZ)	Gold	7,500^{^}
Poland (ZPAV)	Gold	10,000^{*}
United Kingdom (BPI)	Silver	60,000^{‡}
^{*} Sales figures based on certification alone.^{^} Shipments figures based on certification alone.^{‡} Sales+streaming figures based on certification alone.
