= Back from Cali =

Single by Slash featuring Myles Kennedy

from the album Slash
- Released: July 12, 2010
- Recorded: March 2009
- Genre: Hard rock; blues rock
- Length: 3:35
- Label: Universal, EMI, Roadrunner
- Songwriter(s): Saul Hudson; Myles Kennedy
- Producer(s): Eric Valentine

Slash singles chronology
"Rockstar 101" (2010)	"Back from Cali" (2010)	"Beautiful Dangerous" (2010)

Myles Kennedy singles chronology
"Back from Cali" (2010)	"You're a Lie" (2012)

"Back from Cali" is the second single and fourth track from Slash's self-titled solo album. It is one of the two songs on the album to feature Alter Bridge frontman Myles Kennedy on lead vocals, the other being "Starlight." The song was written and recorded in March 2010 added to the album's track listing at the last minute since Slash was so impressed with Kennedy's performance on "Starlight." He later asked Kennedy to front his solo touring band. Both "Back from Cali" and "Starlight" have since become regular features in Slash's live shows.

The music video debuted in March 2010.

== Personnel ==
- Slash – guitars
- Myles Kennedy – lead vocals
- Chris Chaney – bass guitar
- Josh Freese – drums
- Lenny Castro - percussion

== Music video ==
The music video debuted in March 2010. It features the touring band on tour. The video is a compilation of live shows of the band playing "Back from Cali". It includes shows of the first time they played "Back from Cali" on Lopez Tonight, clips of a gig from MTV Classic Launch, and the gig from Rock am Ring 2010, among others. It also includes a few backstage clips of the band and places around California.
