= World on Fire (Slash album) =

2014 studio album by Slash featuring Myles Kennedy and the Conspirators

Studio album by Slash featuring Myles Kennedy and the Conspirators
- Released: September 10, 2014
- Recorded: 2014
- Studio: NRG Studios (Los Angeles); Studio Barbarosa South (Orlando)
- Genre: Hard rock, heavy metal
- Length: 77:24
- Label: Dik Hayd International; Roadrunner
- Producer: Michael "Elvis" Baskette

Slash chronology
Apocalyptic Love (2012)	World on Fire (2014)	Live at the Roxy 9.25.14 (2015)

Myles Kennedy chronology
Fortress (2013)	World on Fire (2014)	Live at the Roxy 9.25.14 (2015)

Singles from World on Fire
- 1. "World on Fire" Released: June 16, 2014; 2. "Bent to Fly" Released: July 1, 2014; 3. "30 Years to Life" Released: August 19, 2014

World on Fire is the second studio album billed to the American band Slash featuring Myles Kennedy and the Conspirators, consisting of Guns N' Roses guitarist Slash and his backup band, released on September 10, 2014; it also acts as Slash's third solo album.

The album was written by Slash and Myles Kennedy while on the road, and produced by Michael "Elvis" Baskette. Kennedy had focused on rhythm guitar and vocals on Apocalyptic Love, but due to his touring with Alter Bridge he worked only on vocals for World on Fire. Returning members Todd Kerns and Brent Fitz played bass and drums, respectively, on the album. The album was given a limited edition box set release which included a T-shirt and a new lenticular album cover.

== Critical reception ==
Professional ratings
Aggregate scores
Source	Rating
Metacritic	63/100
Review scores
Source	Rating
AllMusic	3/5 stars
AltSounds	9/10 stars
Kerrang!	3/5

World on Fire received generally positive reviews from critics. AllMusic stated: "Everything hovers around the 'pretty good' mark: Slash, naturally, stands out and his solos are nearly as pleasurable as his riffs, the Conspirators hit their marks with aplomb, as does Myles Kennedy, who never gets in the way of songs, not even ones he's written. As this train barrels on, there's the sense that the record never really started and will never really end, but such full-throttle indulgence may indeed be what some fans want, for there is a whole lot of bang for this buck."

== Commercial performance ==
World on Fire entered the Billboard 200 at number ten, selling 29,000 album-equivalent units in its first week of release. In the second week, the album dropped down 71 percent to No. 37 on the chart, selling 8,250 copies. The album went on to sell another 4,950 album-equivalent units in the third week on the Billboard 200 album chart, dropping 42 percent to No. 66. As of January 21, 2015, World on Fire had sold more than 80,000 copies in the United States. In Canada, the album peaked at number four on the Canadian Albums Chart, selling 5,300 copies in its first week of release. In the United Kingdom, the release peaked at No. 7 and was certified Silver by the British Phonographic Industry for more than 60,000 sales on August 18, 2017.

== Track listing ==
All tracks are written by Slash and Myles Kennedy, except where noted.

World on Fire track listing
No.	Title	Length
1.	"World on Fire"	4:31
2.	"Shadow Life" (Slash, Kennedy, Todd Kerns)	4:00
3.	"Automatic Overdrive"	3:35
4.	"Wicked Stone"	5:27
5.	"30 Years to Life"	5:08
6.	"Bent to Fly"	4:56
7.	"Stone Blind"	3:49
8.	"Too Far Gone"	4:07
9.	"Beneath the Savage Sun"	5:48
10.	"Withered Delilah"	3:10
11.	"Battleground"	6:59
12.	"Dirty Girl"	4:14
13.	"Iris of the Storm"	4:00
14.	"Avalon"	3:00
15.	"The Dissident"	4:26
16.	"Safari Inn" (Slash; instrumental)	3:26
17.	"The Unholy"	6:48
Total length:		77:24

== Personnel ==
Slash featuring Myles Kennedy and the Conspirators

- Slash – lead guitar, rhythm guitar, slide guitar, six-string bass, 12-string guitar
- Myles Kennedy – lead vocals
- Todd Kerns – bass, acoustic guitar, backing vocals
- Brent Fitz – drums, percussion, electric piano

Production personnel

- Michael "Elvis" Baskette – producer, mixing, engineer
- Jef Moll – engineer
- Ron English – artwork
- Ted Jensen – mastering engineer

== Charts ==
=== Weekly charts ===
Weekly chart performance for World on Fire
Chart (2014)	Peak position
Australian Albums (ARIA)	2
Austrian Albums (Ö3 Austria)	5
Belgian Albums (Ultratop Flanders)	26
Belgian Albums (Ultratop Wallonia)	11
Canadian Albums (Billboard)	4
Danish Albums (Hitlisten)	8
Dutch Albums (Album Top 100)	6
Finnish Albums (Suomen virallinen lista)	3
French Albums (SNEP)	7
German Albums (Offizielle Top 100)	2
Hungarian Albums (MAHASZ)	3
Iceland Albums Chart	5
Irish Albums (IRMA)	2
Italian Albums (FIMI)	3
Japanese Albums (Oricon)	18
New Zealand Albums (RMNZ)	4
Norwegian Albums (VG-lista)	13
Portuguese Albums (AFP)	15
Scottish Albums (OCC)	3
Spanish Albums (PROMUSICAE)	11
Swedish Albums (Sverigetopplistan)	1
Swiss Albums (Schweizer Hitparade)	3
UK Albums (OCC)	7
UK Rock & Metal Albums (OCC)	1
US Billboard 200	10
US Independent Albums (Billboard)	3
US Top Hard Rock Albums (Billboard)	1
US Top Rock Albums (Billboard)	2
US Indie Store Album Sales (Billboard)	8

=== Year-end charts ===
Year-end chart performance for World on Fire
Chart (2014)	Position
US Billboard Rock Albums	70
US Billboard Hard Rock Albums	22
US Billboard Independent Albums	29

== Certifications ==
Certifications for World on Fire
Region	Certification	Certified units/sales
United Kingdom (BPI)	Silver	60,000^{‡}
United States	—	80,000
^{‡} Sales+streaming figures based on certification alone.

== Release history ==
Release history for World on Fire
Country	Date
Japan	September 10, 2014
Malaysia	September 11, 2014
Australia	September 11, 2014
Mexico	September 12, 2014
Europe	September 15, 2014
United States	September 16, 2014
Canada	September 16, 2014
South America	September 16, 2014
