= Union (Union album) =

Studio album by Union
- Released: February 24, 1998
- Genre: Rock, metal
- Label: Mayhem Records
- Producer: Curt Coumo

Union chronology
Union (1998)	The Blue Room (2000)

Union is the debut album by the rock band Union. The album peaked at No. 36 on the Billboard Heatseekers Albums chart in 1998.

== Reception ==
Professional ratings
Review scores
Source	Rating
Allmusic	4/5 stars

Alex Henderson of AllMusic called it "superb" and "one of 1998's strongest rock releases."

== Track listing ==
All tracks are written by Bruce Kulick, John Corabi and Curt Cuomo, except where noted.

No.	Title	Writer(s)	Length
1.	"Old Man Wise"		4:18
2.	"Around Again"		6:10
3.	"Pain Behind Your Eyes"		4:33
4.	"Love (I Don't Need It Anymore)"		3:45
5.	"Heavy D..."		5:42
6.	"Let It Flow"		6:08
7.	"Empty Soul"	Cuomo, Johnson, Kirkpatrick, Corabi, Kulick	4:49
8.	"October Morning Wind"		4:10
9.	"Get Off My Cloud"		4:09
10.	"Tangerine"		4:43
11.	"Robin's Song"	Corabi	4:28
12.	"For You*"		3:01
13.	"Oh! Darling*"	John Lennon and Paul McCartney	3:57

(*) Only available on the Japanese bonus track version of the album.

== Personnel ==
Adapted from the AllMusic credits.

- John Corabi - guitar, vocals, producer
- Brent Fitz - drums, vocals
- Jamie Hunting - bass, vocals
- Bruce Kulick - guitar, vocals, producer
- Curt Coumo - producer
- John Buttino - art director
- William Hames - photography
- Jim Mitchell - mixing
- Patrick Shevelin - mixing
- David Dominguez - engineer
- Shawn Berman - engineer
- Kenny Ybarra - assistant engineer
- Stephen Marcussen - mastering
