= The Hunger (Michael Bolton album) =

Studio album by Michael Bolton
- Released: September 22, 1987
- Recorded: August–December 1986
- Studio: Various: Unique Recording Studios, Soundtrack Studios, Clinton Recording Studio, Sigma Sound Studios, The Hit Factory and The Power Station (New York City, New York); Master Sound Productions (Franklin Square, New York); Fantasy Studios (Berkeley, California); Ocean Way Recording (Hollywood, California); Record Plant and Mad Hatter Studios (Los Angeles, California); Soundcastle and Ground Control (Santa Monica, California); Starlight Sound (Richmond, California); Vertigo Sound (Novato, California)
- Genre: Pop rock
- Length: 37:21
- Labels: Columbia; 40473
- Producers: Jonathan Cain; Keith Diamond; Susan Hamilton

Michael Bolton chronology
Everybody's Crazy (1985)	The Hunger (1987)	Soul Provider (1989)

The Hunger is the fifth studio album by American recording artist Michael Bolton. It was released in 1987 by Columbia Records, his third for the label. It became Bolton's breakthrough album, producing his first two Top 40 hits in the United States, the ballad "That's What Love Is All About" and the Otis Redding cover "(Sittin' On) The Dock of the Bay".

Zelma Redding, the widow of Otis Redding, said Bolton's performance of "(Sittin' On) The Dock of the Bay" moved her so much "that it brought tears to my eyes. It reminded me so much of my husband that I know if he heard it, he would feel the same." In a framed letter that hangs on the wall of Bolton's office, she called the record "my all-time favorite version of my husband's classic."

The album marks a slight transition from the hard rock and arena rock stylings of his previous work into a softer more pop oriented direction, a transition which would be continued and furthered on his subsequent studio albums (although some songs on the album like "Hot Love" retain the sound from his previous albums).

Several songs from this album feature Journey members Jonathan Cain on keyboards, Neal Schon on guitar, and previous member from their Raised on Radio 1986-87 tour Randy Jackson (of American Idol fame) on bass, with Cain also producing several tracks. During this time, there were rumors that Bolton might have been in the running as Journey's new lead singer after Steve Perry's initial departure from the band in early 1987. Also featured on certain tracks is Bolton's former band-mate and then-current Kiss guitarist Bruce Kulick.

Despite only reaching No. 46 on the US Billboard 200, the album achieved stability in the charts. After two years, it was certified Gold in the US (Bolton's first certification of his career), and would subsequently be certified Double Platinum there. In 1990, three years after its initial release, the album entered the UK Albums Chart for the first time and reached its peak of No. 44, following the success of the album Soul Provider.

== Contemporary reviews ==
Professional ratings
Review scores
Source	Rating
AllMusic	link
The Rolling Stone Album Guide	2.5/5 stars

In the May 1988 issue of Circus magazine, music critic Paul Gallotta noted that while the musician was recognized primarily for his songwriting contributions to other artists, his powerful blues-influenced vocal delivery proved too formidable to keep him exclusively in a behind-the-scenes role. The reviewer observed that the vocalist showcased his finest artistic capabilities on tracks such as "That's What Love Is All About," the title track, and a highly commended cover version of Otis Redding's "(Sittin' On) The Dock of the Bay". Gallotta enthusiastically praised the technical proficiency and emotional impact of the performance, metaphorically concluding that the singer possessed a voice captivating enough to elevate even the most mundane material into a compelling listening experience.

== Track listing ==
Side one
No.	Title	Writer(s)	Producer(s)	Length
1.	"Hot Love"	Michael Bolton, Martin Briley	Keith Diamond	3:47
2.	"Wait on Love"	Bolton, Jonathan Cain	Jonathan Cain	4:27
3.	"(Sittin' On) The Dock of the Bay" (Otis Redding cover)	Otis Redding, Steve Cropper	Cain	3:51
4.	"Gina"	Bolton, Bob Halligan Jr., Keith Diamond	Diamond	4:07
5.	"That's What Love Is All About"	Bolton, Eric Kaz	Diamond	3:58

Side two
No.	Title	Writer(s)	Producer(s)	Length
1.	"The Hunger"	Bolton, Cain	Cain	4:18
2.	"You're All That I Need"	Bolton, Cain, Neal Schon	Cain	4:18
3.	"Take a Look at My Face"	Bolton, Briley	Diamond	4:00
4.	"Walk Away"	Bolton, Diane Warren	Susan Hamilton	4:12

== Personnel ==
- Michael Bolton – lead vocals, backing vocals (1, 4–8)
- Keith Diamond – keyboards (1, 4, 5, 8), Fairlight CMI (1, 5, 8), bass (1, 4, 5, 8), drums (1, 4, 5, 8), Linn 9000 programming (4)
- Jeff Neiblum – programming (1, 8)
- Jonathan Cain – keyboards (2, 3, 6, 7)
- Jeff Bova – additional keyboards (4, 8)
- Bobby Khozouri – programming (4)
- Steve Rimland – Fairlight programming (4)
- Skip Anderson – additional keyboards (5)
- Kenn Fink – Fairlight CMI programming (5)
- Ned Liben – Fairlight CMI Series III programming (5, 8)
- Rob Mounsey – keyboards (9), string arrangements (9)
- Bruce Kulick – guitars (1, 8), second guitar solo (1)
- Paul Pesco – guitars (1, 5, 8), first guitar solo (1)
- Ira Siegel – guitars (1, 4, 5), acoustic guitar (5), electric guitar (9)
- Neal Schon – guitars (2, 3, 7)
- Bob Halligan Jr. – guitars (4), backing vocals (4)
- Danny Merlin – guitars (6)
- Timmy Allen – bass guitar (1)
- Randy Jackson – bass guitar (2, 3, 6, 7)
- Doug Wimbish – bass guitar (4)
- Will Lee – bass guitar (9)
- Mike Baird – drums (2, 3, 7)
- Tommy "Mugs" Cain – drums (6), drum programming (7), percussion (7),
- Chris Parker – drums (9)
- Danny Hull – saxophone (2)
- Jerry Jumonville – saxophone (3)
- Bobby Martin – saxophone (3)
- Tom Peterson – saxophone (3)
- Alex Foster – alto flute (5)
- Lenny Pickett – reeds (5)
- V. Jeffrey Smith – saxophone (8)
- Steve Madaio – trumpet (3)
- Vicki Genfan – music contractor (1, 4, 5, 8)
- Tara Shanahan – music contractor (5)
- Leon Pendarvis – horn arrangements, string arrangements and conductor (5)
- Barbara Markay – music copyist (5)
- Jesse Levy and Fredrick Zlotkin – cello (5)
- Karen Dreyfus, Katsuko Esaki, Richard Hendrickson, Harold Kohon, Anthony Posk and Rebecca Young – violin (5)
- Joe Cerisano – backing vocals (1)
- Dennis Feldman – backing vocals (1, 4)
- Curtis King Jr. – backing vocals (1)
- Joe Lynn Turner – backing vocals (1, 4)
- David Glen Eisley – backing vocals (2, 3, 7)
- Lynette Hawkins Stephens – backing vocals (2, 6)
- Walter Hawkins – backing vocals (2, 6)
- James Ingram – backing vocals (2, 3)
- Shaun Murphy – backing vocals (2, 3, 6)
- Jeanie Tracy – backing vocals (2, 6)
- Eric Martin – backing vocals (7)

== Production ==
- Christopher Austopchuk – art direction
- Harris Savides – front cover photography
- Hans Neleman – back cover photography
- Contemporary Communications Corp. – management
- Louis Levin – direction

Technical

- Bob Ludwig – mastering at Masterdisk (New York, NY)
- Acar S. Key – engineer (1, 4, 5)
- Peter Robbins – engineer (1, 5)
- Bob Rosa – engineer (1, 4, 8), mixing (1, 4, 5, 8)
- Keith Diamond – mixing (1, 4, 5, 8)
- Tom Anderson – engineer (2, 3, 6, 7)
- Jamie Bridges – engineer (2, 3, 6, 7)
- Wally Buck – engineer (2, 3, 6, 7)
- Jonathan Cain – engineer (2, 3, 6, 7)
- Larry Hines – engineer (2, 3, 6, 7)
- Paul Lani – engineer (2, 3, 6, 7)
- Robert Missbach – engineer (2, 3, 6, 7)
- Jeffrey Norman – engineer (2, 3, 6, 7)
- Michael Rosen – engineer (2, 3, 6, 7)
- Ron St. Germain – mixing (2, 9), engineer (9)
- Kevin Elson – mixing (3, 6, 7)
- J.C. Convertino – horn and string engineer (5)
- Scott James – vocal overdubs (9)
- Jon Smith – vocal overdubs (9)
- Jon Wolfson – vocal overdubs (9)
- Dave Dale – additional engineer, pre-production
- David Dachinger – additional engineer (1, 8)
- Mark Cobrin – additional engineer (8)
- Bob Broockman – assistant engineer (1, 8)
- Ed Bruder – assistant engineer (1, 5, 8)
- Ken "K.C." Collins – assistant engineer (1, 4, 5)
- George Karras – assistant engineer (1, 4, 5)
- Barbara Milne – assistant engineer (1)
- Tom Vercillo – assistant engineer (1, 8)
- Rob Beaton – second engineer (2, 3, 6, 7)
- Jim Champagne – second engineer (2, 3, 6, 7)
- Don Peterkofsky – assistant horn and string engineer (5)
- Jay Healy – assistant engineer (8)
- Steve Boyer – assistant engineer (9)
- Jackie Brown – assistant engineer (9)
- Debi Cornish – mix assistant (9)

== Chart positions ==
Year	Chart	Peak position
1987	Australian Albums Chart	34
1987	New Zealand Albums Chart	42
1987	Norway Albums Chart	10
1990	UK Albums Chart	44
1987	US Billboard 200	46

=== Singles ===
Year	Title	U.S. Hot 100	U.S. AC
1987	"That's What Love Is All About"	19	3
1987	"(Sittin' On) The Dock of the Bay"	11	19
1988	"Wait On Love"	79	-
1988	"Walk Away"	-	14

== Certifications ==
Region	Certification	Certified units/sales
Canada (Music Canada)	Platinum	100,000^{^}
United States (RIAA)	2× Platinum	2,000,000^{^}
Summaries
Norway & Sweden	—	100,000
^{^} Shipments figures based on certification alone.

== Cover versions ==
- Marc Anthony would later cover "Walk Away" with Little Louie Vega for their 1991 album When the Night is Over.
- Sunstorm, who are fronted by Joe Lynn Turner (who sang backing vocals on "Hot Love" and "Gina"), covered "Gina" for their 2012 album Emotional Fire.
- Dutch singer Gordon recorded "Walk Away" for his 1994 album Now Is the Time.
- Venezuelan rock band Gillman covered "You're All That I Need" under the name "Necesito de ti" for their 1990 album El Regreso del Guerrero.
