= Michael Bolton (album) =

Studio album by Michael Bolton
- Released: April 1983
- Recorded: 1982–83
- Studios: Sigma Sound Studios and Power Station (New York City, New York)
- Genres: Rock; arena rock; R&B
- Length: 33:19
- Label: Columbia
- Producers: Michael Bolton; Gerry Block

Michael Bolton chronology
Everyday of My Life (1976)	Michael Bolton (1983)	Everybody's Crazy (1985)

Singles from Michael Bolton
- 1. "Fool's Game" Released: 1983

Michael Bolton is the third studio album by American recording artist Michael Bolton. Released in 1983, it was Bolton's first record to be released on Columbia Records. This was also the first time that Bolton recorded under his stage name as his previous two albums had been released under his given name, Michael Bolotin.

It features Bruce Kulick on lead guitar, rotating with Bolton himself. Al Pitrelli was lead guitarist on the album's supporting tour.

== Reception ==
Professional ratings
Review scores
Source	Rating
AllMusic	3/5 stars
The Rolling Stone Album Guide	2/5 stars

The Rolling Stone Album Guide said the album was "better balanced and more pop-savvy [than the rest of Bolton's first four albums], but falters when he attempts an over-burdened rendition of the Supremes' 'Back in My Arms Again'."

AllMusic gave the album a generally negative retrospective review, saying that it was dominated by arena rock cliches, but acknowledged that "Bolton was an undeniably involving singer, and songs like 'Fools Game,' the lead-off track and chart single, were satisfying pop efforts".

== Track listing ==
Side one
No.	Title	Writer(s)	Length
1.	"Fool's Game"	Michael Bolton, Craig Brooks, Mark Mangold	3:56
2.	"She Did the Same Thing"	Bolton	3:52
3.	"Hometown Hero"	Bolton, Scott Zito	3:41
4.	"Can't Hold On, Can't Let Go"	Bolton	3:22
5.	"Fighting for My Life"	Bolton	3:28

Side two
No.	Title	Writer(s)	Length
1.	"Paradise"	Bolton, Zito	4:00
2.	"Back in My Arms Again" (Originally recorded by The Supremes)	Brian Holland, Lamont Dozier, Edward Holland	3:14
3.	"Carrie"	Bolton	3:51
4.	"I Almost Believed You"	Bolton, Patrick Henderson	4:05

== Personnel ==
Musicians

- Michael Bolton – lead vocals, backing vocals, guitar solo (1, 3), lead guitar (5)
- Lloyd Landesman – Prophet-5 synthesizer programming, backing vocals (2, 4, 5, 7)
- Mark Mangold – synthesizers (1), backing vocals (1)
- Jan Mullaney – acoustic piano (1–3, 8), synthesizers (2–5, 8), Hammond organ (7)
- Scott Zito – backing vocals (2, 6), acoustic piano (6), synthesizers (6), lead guitar (6), rhythm guitar (6), bass (6)
- Aldo Nova – synthesizers (4), lead guitar (7)
- George S. Clinton – synthesizers (9), backing vocals (9)
- Doug Katsaros – acoustic piano (9)
- Craig Brooks – rhythm guitar (1), backing vocals (1, 3–5, 7–9)
- Bob Kulick – rhythm guitar (2–5, 7–9)
- Bruce Kulick – lead guitar (2, 4)
- Mark Clarke – bass (1–5, 7–9)
- Michael Braun – drums (1)
- Chuck Burgi – drums (2–9)

=== Production ===
- Louis Levin – executive producer, direction
- Gerry Block – producer
- Michael Bolton – producer
- Jan Mullaney – associate producer
- Allen Weinberg – design
- David Michael Kennedy – photography
- David Krebs – direction
- Steve Leber – direction

Technical credits

- Bob Ludwig – mastering at Masterdisk (New York, NY)
- Gerry Block – engineer, mixing (2, 6, 9)
- Carla Bandini – engineer
- John Convertino – engineer
- Tony Bongiovi – mixing (1, 3–5, 7, 8), additional recording
- Barry Bongiovi – assistant engineer
- Jeffrey Hendrickson – assistant engineer
- Linda Randazzo – assistant engineer
- Garry Rindfuss – assistant engineer
- Glenn Rosenstein – assistant engineer
- Jimmy Santis – assistant engineer
- John Potoker – drum sound technician

== Cover versions ==
- Eric Martin covered "Can't Hold On, Can't Let Go" on his 1985 album Eric Martin.
- René Froger covered "I Almost Believed You" on his 1990 album Midnight Man.
- Axel Rudi Pell covered "Fools Game" on his 2007 covers album Diamonds Unlocked.
- Last Autumn's Dream covered "Fools Game" on their 2010 album Yes.

== Charts ==
Chart performance for Michael Bolton
Chart (1983)	Peak position
US Billboard 200	89

== Certifications ==
Region	Certification	Certified units/sales
United States (RIAA)	Gold	500,000^{^}
^{^} Shipments figures based on certification alone.
