= Transformer (Bruce Kulick album) =

Studio album by Bruce Kulick
- Released: July 20, 2004
- Studio: Woodland Ranch, Woodland Hills, CA
- Genre: Hard rock Heavy Metal
- Length: 51:21
- Label: Perris Records
- Producer: Bruce Kulick; Stephan Hanuman; Curt Cuomo

Bruce Kulick chronology
Audiodog (2001)	Transformer (2004)	BK3 (2010)

Professional ratings
Review scores
Source	Rating
Allmusic	3.5/5 stars

Transformer is the second solo album by former Kiss guitarist Bruce Kulick, released in 2004 by Perris Records. It was produced by Bruce Kulick, Stephan Hanuman and Curt Cuomo, and its cover was designed by Jim Bovin. The album features drummer Brent Fitz and vocalist John Corabi, both of whom Bruce had worked with in the band Union. Curt Cuomo provided backing vocals on the album, and Tim Cashion of Grand Funk Railroad played keyboards.

== Track listing ==
All songs written by Bruce Kulick. All are sung by Kulick except where noted.

No.	Title	Lead Vocals	Length
1.	"Jump the Shark"	(Instrumental)	2:51
2.	"I Can't Breathe"		4:10
3.	"If Love's the Answer"		4:17
4.	"Crazy"		3:23
5.	"All That I Need"		3:24
6.	"Don't Tell Me Something"		4:38
7.	"Inn of the Mountain Gods"	(Instrumental)	5:33
8.	"It's Just My Life"	John Corabi	4:49
9.	"Do It Right"		4:50
10.	"Beautiful to Me"		4:26
11.	"Truth or Dare"		5:32
12.	"Against the Grain"	(Instrumental)	3:28
Total length:			51:21

== Personnel ==
- Bruce Kulick - Vocals, Guitar, Bass, Mandolin, Dulcimer
- John Corabi - vocals on "Its Just My Life"
- Brent Fitz - drums
- Tim Cashion - keyboards
- Curt Cuomo - backing vocals
