= Drive, She Said (band) =

American band

Drive, She Said was an American rock band consisting of Al Fritsch and Mark Mangold. The band formed in 1986. They were signed by CBS Records in 1988 and their debut self-titled album, released in 1989, included guest appearances by Aldo Nova, Fiona Flanagan, and Bob Kulick.

Some songs by Drive, She Said, appeared in the 2003 American short film Advantage Hart.

On October 10, 2017, Fritsch died.

== Personnel ==
- Al Fritsch – vocals, guitar, bass guitar, keyboards
- Mark Mangold – keyboards, backing vocals, drums

== Discography ==
=== Studio albums ===
- Drive, She Said (1989)
- Drivin' Wheel (1991)
- Excelerator (1993)
- Real Life (2003)
- Pedal to the Metal (2016)

=== Compilation albums ===
- Road to Paradise (1998)
- Dreams Will Come - The Best of & More (2010)

=== Singles ===
- "If This Is Love" (1989)
- "Think of Love" (1991)
- "When You Love Someone" (1991)
