= Fool's Game =

1983 single by Michael Bolton

Single by Michael Bolton

from the album Michael Bolton
- B-side: "Fighting For My Life"
- Released: 1983
- Genre: Hard rock; glam rock
- Length: 3:50
- Label: Columbia
- Songwriters: Michael Bolton; Craig Brooks; Mark Mangold
- Producers: Michael Bolton; Gerry Block

Michael Bolton singles chronology
| "If I Had Your Love" (1976) | "Fool's Game" (1983) | "Everybody's Crazy" (1985) |

"Fool's Game" is a song by Michael Bolton. It was released in 1983 as a single from his self-titled album.

The song is Bolton's first Billboard Hot 100 entry, peaking at No. 82.

== Music video ==
A music video shot on a dark soundstage along with Bolton hanging out with girls and performing the track on said soundstage was also made for the song.

== Chart performance ==
| Chart (1983) | Peak position |
|---|---|
| US Billboard Hot 100 | 82 |
| US Billboard Top Tracks | 27 |
