= Eric Singer Project =

American rock band

- Also known as: ESP
- Genre: Rock
- Years active: 1990s–present
- Members: John Corabi; Bruce Kulick; Eric Singer; Chuck Garric
- Past members: Karl Cochran (died 2025)

The Eric Singer Project (ESP) is an American rock band. It was founded in the 1990s by Eric Singer, drummer for rock bands such as Lita Ford, Black Sabbath, Badlands, Alice Cooper, and Kiss, along with Bruce Kulick (Kiss, Grand Funk Railroad) on guitar, John Corabi (the Scream, Mötley Crüe, Ratt) on guitar and bass, and Karl Cochran on guitar and bass. Lead vocal duties were shared by Eric, John, and Karl.

As of 2007, ESP has released two albums and one DVD. The first & only studio album is an all-covers album, titled Lost and Spaced. Released in 1998, the album is hard to find and is composed mostly of studio recordings and demos. The second album, ESP Live in Japan, was released in 2007, and is a live album. The DVD is titled ESP Live at the Marquee. Chuck Garric replaced Karl Cochran on bass in 2006 and plays on the live album.

== Discography ==
=== (1998) Lost and Spaced track listing ===
1. "Set Me Free" (studio) Originally recorded by Sweet
2. "Four Day Creep" (studio) Originally recorded by Humble Pie
3. "Free Ride" (studio) Originally recorded by Edgar Winter Group
4. "Still Alive & Well" (studio) Originally recorded by Johnny Winter
5. "Never Before" (studio) Originally recorded by Deep Purple
6. "Goin' Blind" (studio) Originally recorded by Kiss
7. "Teenage Nervous Breakdown" (studio) Originally recorded by Little Feat
8. "Changes" (studio) Originally recorded by The Jimi Hendrix Experience
9. "S.O.S. (Too Bad)" (studio) Originally recorded by Aerosmith
10. "Foxy Lady" (studio) Originally recorded by The Jimi Hendrix Experience
11. "Twenty Flight Rock" (studio) Originally recorded by Eddie Cochran
12. "Won't Get Fooled Again" (studio) Originally recorded by The Who
13. "Snortin' Whiskey" (demo, studio) Originally recorded by Pat Travers
14. "We're An American Band" (demo, studio) Originally recorded by Grand Funk Railroad

=== (2007) ESP Live in Japan track listing ===
1. "Watchin' You" Originally recorded by Kiss
2. "Love (I Don't Need It Anymore)" Originally recorded by Union
3. "Unholy" Originally recorded by KISS
4. "Do Your Own Thing" Originally recorded by Union
5. "Domino" Originally recorded by KISS
6. "Black Diamond" Originally recorded by KISS
7. "Oh! Darling" Originally recorded by The Beatles
8. "War Machine" Originally recorded by KISS
9. "School's Out" Originally recorded by Alice Cooper
10. "I Love It Loud" Originally recorded by KISS
11. "Power To The Music" Originally recorded by Mötley Crüe

=== ESP Live at the Marquee ===
1. "Do Your Own Thing" Originally recorded by Union
2. "Watchin' You" Originally recorded by Kiss
3. "Unholy" Originally recorded by Kiss
4. "Love (I Don't Need It Anymore)" Originally recorded by Union
5. "Four Day Creep" Originally recorded by Humble Pie
6. "Nothing to Lose" Originally recorded by Kiss
7. "War Machine" Originally recorded by Kiss
8. "Jump the Shark" Originally recorded by Bruce Kulick
9. "Born to Raise Hell" Originally recorded by Motörhead
10. "Free Ride" Originally recorded by Edgar Winter Group
11. "Power To The Music" Originally recorded by Mötley Crüe
12. "Black Diamond" Originally recorded by Kiss
13. "We're an American Band" Originally recorded by Grand Funk Railroad
14. "I Love It Loud" Originally recorded by Kiss
15. "Domino" Originally recorded by Kiss
16. "Smoking in the Boys Room" Originally recorded by Brownsville Station
17. "Jungle" Originally recorded by Kiss

== Reception ==
In a review for the Arizona Republic in 1999, Eric Searleman panned the ESP album, saying, "it sounds like a group of nobodies with too much time on their hands".
