= Michael Hobert =

American actor and scriptwriter

- Born: 1978 (age 47–48); Chenequa, Wisconsin, USA
- Education: Arrowhead High School; University of Southern California
- Occupations: Actor; Producer; Screenwriter

Michael Hobert (born 1978) is an American actor, writer, and producer.

== Career ==
Hobert had a recurring role on the TV show Scrubs as Lonnie. His brother, Tim Hobert, was one of the show's producers. Hobert has also appeared in Spin City, on which Tim was also a producer, and Gilmore Girls. When working on Spin City, ABC incorrectly identified the Hoberts as being from Milwaukee, when they are actually from Madison, Wisconsin.

He wrote a movie with Sam Jaeger called Advantage Hart. Hobert was originally in the first episode of Scrubs, "My First Day", as "Pizza Delivery Guy", who was the guy in the MRI machine.

Writing with his brother Tim, Hobert sold a single-camera comedy to NBC in 2011, and a multi-camera comedy to CBS in 2012. Hobert presented the digital series The Paranormal and Extraterrestrial Squad as a guest at San Diego Comic-Con in 2013.

== Personal life ==
Hobert was raised a Catholic in Chenequa, Wisconsin, and graduated Arrowhead High School in 1997 before attending the film program at the University of Southern California. Hobert is the youngest of five brothers. He is married with one son. His niece is singer-songwriter Audrey Hobert and nephew is musician Malcolm Todd Hobert.

== Filmography ==
=== Acting ===
Film appearances by Michael Hobert
Year	Title	Role	Notes	Ref.
2012	Ben Banks	Greg Timmons		

Television appearances by Michael Hobert
Year	Title	Role	Notes	Ref.
1999–2001	Spin City	College Student / Max / Kid	4 episodes	
2001–2009	Scrubs	Lonnie	16 episodes	
2006	Gilmore Girls	Brandon	Episode: "Merry Fisticuffs"	
2011	Casual	Mike	9 episodes	
2012	The Aquabats! Super Show!	Angry Miner / Firefighter #1	2 episodes	
2013–2015	The PET Squad Files	Courtney Shipp	12 episodes; also co-creator	
2015	The Sixth Lead	Mike	3 episodes	

=== Technical roles ===
Films for which Michael Hobert has been a producer
Year	Title	Ref.
2011	Take Me Home	

Television shows for which Michael Hobert has written
Year	Title	Notes	Ref.
2008–2010	'Til Death	21 episodes	
2011	Comedy Central Roast of Donald Trump	Television special	
2013–2015	The PET Squad Files	5 episodes; also co-creator	
2014–2015	Undateable	25 episodes	
2018	Living Biblically	Episode: "Honor Thy Father"	
2019	Happy Together	Episode: "Vows"	
2019–2021	American Housewife	4 episodes	
2022	iCarly	Episode: "iBuild a Team"	
2026	Scrubs	Episode: "My Poker Face"	
2026	Scrubs	Episode: "My Ex's Ex"	
