= BK3 (album) =

Studio album by Bruce Kulick
- Released: February 2, 2010
- Genre: Hard rock Heavy Metal
- Length: 46:07
- Label: Twenty4
- Producer: Bruce Kulick; Jeremy Rubolino

Bruce Kulick chronology
Transformer (2003)	BK3 (2010)

Professional ratings
Review scores
Source	Rating
Allmusic	3.5/5 stars
Rock Eyez	4/5 stars
Vista Records	(4.25/5)

BK3 is the third solo album by rock guitarist Bruce Kulick. It was released by Twenty4 Records on February 2, 2010.

Bruce Kulick has been the lead guitarist for Grand Funk Railroad since 2001. He was the lead guitarist for Kiss from 1984 to 1996.

The album featured drummer Brent Fitz and vocalist John Corabi both of whom Bruce had worked with the band Union.

BK3 reached number 12 on the Billboard Heatseeker Albums chart. Classic Rock magazine listed BK3 as one of the top 50 albums of 2010, and named the song "Dirty Girl" as the 29th best song of 2010.

== Track listing ==
1. "Fate" (Kevin Churko, Bruce Kulick, Jeremy Rubolino) – 3:31
2. "Ain't Gonna Die" (Gene Simmons, Kulick, Rubolino) – 4:10
3. "No Friend of Mine" (John Corabi, Kulick, Rubolino) – 4:08
4. "Hand of the King" (Nick Simmons, Kulick, Rubolino) – 4:55
5. "I'll Survive" (Kulick, Rubolino) – 4:47
6. "Dirty Girl" (Kulick, Rubolino) – 3:59
7. "Final Mile" (Dan Lavery, Kulick, Rubolino) – 4:14
8. "I'm the Animal" (Tobias Sammet, Kulick, Rubolino) – 4:42
9. "And I Know" (Kulick, Rubolino) – 3:16
10. "Between the Lines" (Kulick, Rubolino) – 3:54
11. "Life" (Kulick, Rubolino) – 4:32
12. "Love And Desire" (Bonus Track) -- 4:40

== Personnel ==
=== Musicians ===
- Bruce Kulick – guitar, bass, vocals
- Steve Lukather – lead guitar on "Between the Lines"
- Jeremy Rubolino – bass on "Fate", "Ain't Gonna Die", "Dirty Girl", "Final Mile", "I'm the Animal"; acoustic guitar on "No Friend of Mine"; keyboards on "I'll Survive", "Life"; piano on "Between the Lines"; backing vocals on "Fate", "Ain't Gonna Die", "No Friend of Mine", "I'll Survive", "Life"
- Jimmy Haslip – bass on "Between the Lines"
- Brent Fitz – drums on "Ain't Gonna Die", "No Friend of Mine", "Hand of the King", "I'll Survive", "Dirty Girl", "Final Mile", "And I Know", "Life"
- Eric Singer – drums on "I'm the Animal"
- Kenny Aronoff – drums on "Between the Lines"
- Gene Simmons – vocals on "Ain't Gonna Die"
- John Corabi – vocals on "No Friend of Mine"
- Doug Fieger - vocals on "Dirty Girl"
- Tobias Sammet – vocals on "I'm the Animal"
- Nick Simmons – vocals on "Hand of the King"
- Jeremy Lichter – background vocals on "Ain't Gonna Die", "I'll Survive"
- Wally Wingert – background vocals on "Ain't Gonna Die", "I'll Survive"
- Christian Malmin – background vocals on "I'll Survive"
- Ken Gullic – background vocals on "Ain't Gonna Die", "I'll Survive"
- Cliff Calabro – background vocals on "No Friend of Mine", "Dirty Girl", "Final Mile", "And I Know", "Life"
- Levana Waiche and Neely Waiche - background vocals on "I'll Survive"
- Mark Robertson, Alma Fernandez, Sam Fischer, Vanessa Freebairn-Smith – strings on "Ain't Gonna Die", "Life"

=== Production ===
- Bruce Kulick – producer
- Jeremy Rubolino – producer, engineer
- Tom Jermann – art direction, design
- Neil Zlozower – photography

=== Website Production ===
- Chris White - technical manager, developer
- Elizabeth White - content manager

== Charts ==
Year	Chart	Position
2010	Billboard Top Heatseekers	12
