= Doug Katsaros =

American musical artist

- Genres: Rock, Broadway
- Occupations: Musician, songwriter
- Instruments: Keyboards, vocals
- Years active: 1978–present
- Website: musicofyourdreams.com

Doug Katsaros is an American keyboardist, arranger, composer, and conductor.

== Biography ==
In 1978 he played on Paul Stanley's debut album, followed by working on albums by Richie Havens, Michael Bolton, Arc Angel, Bon Jovi and his band Balance featuring Bob Kulick and Chuck Burgi. He also contributed music to the musicals Diamonds and A... My Name Is Alice. He also composed the opening theme for the TV series The Tick and Bucky O'Hare and the Toad Wars, as well as music for the movie Who Do I Gotta Kill? starring Sandra Bullock. Katsaros has worked with some of the biggest names in music history such as Cher, Rod Stewart, Sinéad O'Connor, Gloria Estefan, Judy Collins, Elton John, Aerosmith, Marlo Thomas, Sarah Jessica Parker, Robin Beck, Shania Twain, B.B. King, Diane Schuur, Liza Minnelli, Todd Rundgren, Tim Rice, Russ Irwin, Peter Frampton, Alejandro Fernández, Christina Aguilera, as well as Peter, Paul and Mary. His jingle for Mennen was featured in every television commercial for their products. Together with Richie Kotzen, Billy Sheehan, Dee Snider, Glenn Hughes, Devin Townsend, Geoff Tate, Bob Kulick and others he recorded the album SIN-Atra (2011).

== Awards ==
- 1984: Emmy Award - ABC Afterschool Specials for Outstanding Music Composition in Children's Programming (Nomination)
- 2005: Drama Desk Award - Altar Boyz (Nomination)
- 2012: Emmy Award - The 85th Anniversary of the Macy's Thanksgiving Day Parade for Outstanding Original Song (Won)

== Discography ==
- 1978: Kiss – Paul Stanley
- 1980: Rex Smith – Forever, Rex Smith
- 1980: Richie Havens – Connections
- 1982: Balance – In for the Count
- 1983: Michael Bolton – Michael Bolton
- 1983: Arc Angel – Arc Angel
- 1984: Bon Jovi – Bon Jovi
- 1985: Michael Bolton – Everybody's Crazy
- 1987: Cher – Cher
- 1990: Judy Collins – Fires of Eden
- 1991: Sinéad O'Connor – Silent Night
- 1991: Russ Irwin – Russ Irwin
- 1991: Todd Rundgren – 2nd Wind
- 1992: Sinéad O'Connor – Success Has Made a Failure of Our Home
- 1992: Peter, Paul & Mary – Flowers and Stones
- 1992: Sinéad O'Connor – Am I Not your Girl?
- 1993: Gloria Estefan – Christmas Through Your Eyes
- 1994: B.B. King & Diane Schuur – Heart to Heart
- 1994: Ann Hampton Callaway – Bring Back Romance
- 1995: Cliff Eberhardt – Mona Lisa Cafe
- 1995: Peter, Paul & Mary – LifeLines
- 1995: Raúl di Blasio – Latino: Piano de America
- 1996: Peter, Paul & Mary – LifeLines Live
- 1997: Billy Stritch – Waters of March
- 1997: Raúl di Blasio – Solo
- 1997: Live – Secret Samadhi
- 1999: Georg Wadenius & Doug Katsaros – Left Turn From the Right Lane
- 1999: Tim Rice & Elton John – Aida
- 2001: Donny Osmond – This Is The Moment
- 2002: Raúl di Blasio – Tango
- 2002: Rod Stewart – It Had To Be You: The Great American Songbook
- 2003: Peter, Paul & Mary – Carry It On
- 2004: Marlo Thomas – Thanks & Giving All Year Long
- 2004: Diane Schuur – Rediscovery on GRP
- 2005: Rod Stewart – The Great American Songbook
- 2006: Raúl di Blasio – Los Exitos
- 2007: Andiamo – Love, From Italy
- 2009: Balance – Equilibrium
- 2012: Dee Snider – Dee Does Broadway
- 2013: Alejandro Fernández – Confidencias
- 2017: Bob Kulick – Skeletons In The Closet
