= Brent Fitz =

Musical artist (born 1970)

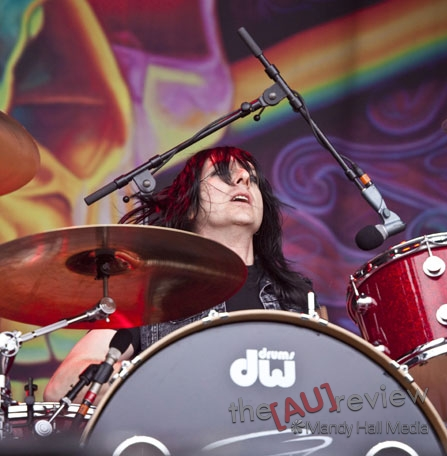
- Fitz performing with Slash in 2011

Background information
- Born: Brent Fitz; March 27, 1970 (age 56); Winnipeg, Manitoba, Canada
- Genres: Hard rock, pop, blues
- Occupation: Musician
- Instruments: Drums, bass guitar, keyboards
- Years active: 1986–present
- Website: www.brentfitz.com

Brent Fitz (born March 27, 1970) is a Canadian-American musician and multi-instrumentalist. In his career, he has worked with Slash, Myles Kennedy, Theory of a Deadman, Alice Cooper, Vince Neil, Union, Gene Simmons, The Guess Who, Brad Whitford from Aerosmith, Derek St. Holmes, Ronnie Montrose, Indigenous, Lamya, Streetheart, Harlequin, and Econoline Crush.

== Biography ==
=== Early life ===
Brent is a native of Winnipeg, Manitoba, Canada, where he grew up with his parents Mervyn and Audrey Fitz and a sister, Brenda, who is also a professional musician. He attended and graduated from John Taylor Collegiate in 1988. His parents continue to take a keen interest in his career, with his mother Audrey cited as saying "we get to look at his tour schedule and follow him across the world". After leaving Winnipeg in the mid-1990s, he lived for some time in Los Angeles, California, and currently resides in Las Vegas, Nevada.

Fitz started piano lessons at the age of five and drums at the age of ten, playing percussion in his middle school and high school jazz and concert band music programs. He received piano and theory training through The Royal Conservatory of Music in Toronto, Ontario, and graduated in 1994. In 1985, Brent answered an ad for a teaching job at a local drum shop in Winnipeg, and despite being only 15 at the time, was hired based on his excelled musical ability and people skills.

==== Move to LA ====
Fitz got his professional start at age 15, playing in various Winnipeg clubs and outlying areas in a cover band named New Alliance. After graduating high school, he formed the band Seventh Heaven with two local musicians and two Los Angeles natives that had recently relocated to Winnipeg. After several years of touring, Brent formed another band with Seventh Heaven's guitarist, which evolved into Shake Naked. Of this period, his father related that 'we used to go to every gig he played in Winnipeg bars, ladies of the night would pass us, going through to go to the bathroom". Schedules with Seventh Heaven and Shake Naked were much more extensive and involved touring most of Canada. In 1993, Fitz joined Kenny Shields from the band Streetheart and toured across Canada for the next three years. In 1996, while attending the NAMM music trade show in Anaheim, California, connections to the city of Los Angeles within the band Seventh Heaven, allowed Fitz to have the opportunity to seek work in that market as a performer and session player.

Working with previous Shake Naked vocalist Lenita Erickson later proved fruitful as Erickson's friend Bruce Kulick of Kiss fame invited Fitz to join him in a recording effort after first hearing him play piano, and later seeing him play drums at The Roxy in Hollywood, with former Duran Duran backup singer, Lamya . That band would become known as Union and would also include John Corabi on vocals (formerly of The Scream and Mötley Crüe), James Hunting of David Lee Roth on bass, with Kulick on guitar. This four-piece released their self-titled debut in 1998. A live record titled Live In The Galaxy was released in 1999, and the band recorded a second album titled The Blue Room that was released in February 2000.

==== Vince Neil ====
In September 2000, Fitz briefly joined the Bulletboys on tour in support of their Best Of collection, and recorded several new songs at Cherokee Studios in Los Angeles with famed Led Zeppelin producer, Andy Johns. Soon after, he also toured and recorded with Gilby Clarke, and recorded drum tracks for the Slimmer Twins album Lack Of Luxury, featuring Kix guitarist Ronnie Younkins. In early 2001, Fitz received an invitation to tour with Vince Neil who re-released his two solo-records that summer. Performing on several international tours, and recorded the album Live At The Whisky in 2002. In the same year he joined Neil for the Rock Never Stops Tour from may through to July, followed by a support slot for Poison in 2003. He continued to feature with Neil on tour, although the imminent Mötley Crüe reunion at the end of 2004 put the band on hiatus.

==== Alice Cooper ====
In the first half of 2005 Fitz joined the Canadian band Theory of a Deadman as the band embarked on tour to support the album Gasoline. The band had fired their original drummer Tim Hart, while Robin Diaz played the parts on the album. According to guitarist David Brenner, Fitz is "a music theory nut" who also contributed backing vocals and piano. He was "able to come in and play these other guys' parts and really make them his own". Fitz appeared in four music videos with the band, and made several television appearances including The Tonight Show with Jay Leno.

In July 2006, while still touring with Theory of a Deadman, Fitz temporarily left the band to tour with Alice Cooper, filling in on drums for Eric Singer while Singer was touring with Kiss. Later that year, Fitz toured the US with Mato Nanji as Indigenous in support of the album Chasing the Sun. He also took part in the sessions for the Harlequin album Waking the Jester released in 2007.

In 2007, Fitz recorded with the recently reformed Canadian rock act Econoline Crush on the album Ignite. He subsequently became a permanent member of the band, while still remaining as regular back-up drummer with Alice Cooper. Fitz appeared in the video for the Econoline Crush hit song "Dirty".

==== Bruce Kulick ====
In 2009, Fitz joined the Las Vegas-based production of 'Monster Circus' as keyboardist/guitarist/vocalist. Monster Circus performed at The Hilton Hotel and Casino in Las Vegas, Nevada. The band featured Dee Snider of Twisted Sister, bassist Rudy Sarzo, guitarist Tony Montana of Great White, guitarist Dave Kushner from Velvet Revolver, and John Corabi and Bruce Kulick (from Fitz's former band Union).

In June 2009, Fitz appeared on the television show Gene Simmons Family Jewels (season 4, episode 2: Memphis Blues); he and Bruce Kulick helped with some recording studio work Gene Simmons arranged for his son Nick's musical aspirations. Fitz also recorded drums for most of the tracks on Kulick's 2010 album release BK3, including tracks featuring guest artists Gene Simmons, Nick Simmons, John Corabi, and Doug Fieger of The Knack. Fitz appeared on a second episode in June 2010, this time performing live with Bruce Kulick and Nick Simmons at The Cat Club in Hollywood, California.

==== Slash ====
In March 2010, Fitz became drummer for then-former Guns N' Roses/Velvet Revolver guitarist Slash. The band which also features Alter Bridge singer Myles Kennedy, eventually became known as Slash Featuring Myles Kennedy and The Conspirators, and released four albums: Apocalyptic Love in 2012, World on Fire in 2014, Living The Dream in 2018, and 4 in 2022. Four live albums have been recorded also, Live in Manchester in 2010, Made in Stoke in 2011, Live at The Roxy in 2015, and Living the Dream Tour in 2019. With the band, Fitz has performed on several US talk shows in including: The Tonight Show with Jay Leno, Jimmy Fallon, Jimmy Kimmel, Ellen, Conan (twice), Lopez Tonight (twice), and The Late Late Show with Craig Ferguson, as well as performed live on Howard Stern. Fitz also appeared in several music videos including "By The Sword" featuring Andrew Stockdale, "Back From Cali", "Beautiful Dangerous" featuring Fergie, "You're A Lie", "Bad Rain", and "Anastasia". The band has two #1 singles on the US Active Rock charts: "You're A Lie", and "World on Fire", as well as two top 5 songs: "Standing In The Sun" and "Bent to Fly" (which spent over 27 weeks on the chart). The band headlined the 2014 MTV Euro Awards in Glasgow, Scotland, playing "Crazy Train", with a tribute to Ozzy Osbourne, who received the lifetime achievement award from MTV.

==== Derek Sharp and The Champagne Jam ====
In 2025, Brent Fitz joined Derek Sharp and The Champagne Jam, the band led vocalist Derek Sharp. He recorded as the drummer for the album Crossing The Rubicon.

== Albums ==
- Slash featuring Myles Kennedy & The Conspirators - Flying Blind (2027)
- Slash featuring Myles Kennedy & The Conspirators - 4 (2022)
- Slash featuring Myles Kennedy & The Conspirators - Living the Dream Tour (2019)
- Phil X & The Drills - Stupid Good Lookings, Vol.1 (2019)
- Slash featuring Myles Kennedy & The Conspirators - Living the Dream (2018)
- The Guess Who - The Future IS What It Used To Be (2018)
- Sass Jordan - Racine Revisited (2017)
- Chemia - Let Me (2015)
- Slash featuring Myles Kennedy & The Conspirators - Live at the Roxy 9.25.14 (2015)
- Slash featuring Myles Kennedy & The Conspirators - World On Fire (2014)
- Jake E. Lee (Red Dragon Cartel) - Red Dragon Cartel (2014)
- Slash featuring Myles Kennedy & The Conspirators - Apocalyptic Love (2012)
- Slash featuring Myles Kennedy - Made in Stoke 24/7/11 (2011)
- Beggars & Thieves - We Are The Broken Hearted (2011)
- Syndicate - Syndicate (2011)
- Slash - Live in Manchester (Slash album) (2010)
- Slash - iTunes Session (2010)
- Slash - Slash (Deluxe Edition) (2010)
- Bruce Kulick - BK3 (2010)
- Econoline Crush - Ignite (2008)
- Harlequin - Waking the Jester (2007)
- Various Artists: WWE Wreckless Intent (2006)
- Theory of a Deadman - Gasoline (2005)
- Various Artists: Numbers from the Beast, a tribute to Iron Maiden (2005)
- Voodooland - Give Me Air (2003)
- Vince Neil - Live at the Whisky: One Night Only (2003)
- Bruce Kulick - Transformer (2002)
- Gilby Clarke - Swag (2002)
- Bruce Kulick - Audiodog (2001)
- Union - The Blue Room (2000)
- Union - Live in the Galaxy (1999)
- Union - Union (1998)
- Various Artists: Forever Mod - A Portrait of a Storyteller, a tribute to Rod Stewart (1998)
- Various Artists: Return of the Comet, a tribute to Ace Frehley (1997)
