= Balance (band) =

American hard rock band

- Origin: New York City, United States
- Genres: Hard rock
- Years active: 1980–1983
- Label: Portrait
- Members: Bob Kulick; Peppy Castro; Doug Katsaros; Andy Newmark; Gregg Gerson; Dennis Feldman; Chuck Burgi

Balance was an early 1980s American hard rock band. based out of New York City, United States, and fronted by Peppy Castro, formerly of Blues Magoos. They are best known for their top 40 1981 hit, "Breaking Away".

== Biography ==
In addition to Castro, original members included guitarist Bob Kulick and arranger/keyboardist Doug Katsaros. The trio recorded their self-titled debut album with session musicians, one of whom, drummer Andy Newmark, also co-wrote one of the songs on the album and was apparently an official member of the band at one point. Newmark was later replaced by Gregg Gerson, who departed soon thereafter to play with Billy Idol. Prior to recording their follow-up album, Balance added the rhythm section of drummer Chuck Burgi (ex-Brand X) and bassist Dennis Feldman (ex-Speedway Blvd.) to the lineup.

The group's most noteworthy release was 1981's "Breaking Away" from their eponymous debut album which reached No. 133 on the Billboard 200. The song peaked at No. 22 on the Billboard Hot 100 singles chart in the US, and also hit the top 40 in Canada, peaking at No. 35 in RPM. The album's follow-up single, "Falling in Love", peaked at No. 58 in the US. The band failed to reach the Hot 100 chart again.

In early 1982, Balance entered The Power Station in New York to produce their sophomore album, In For The Count, with Tony Bongiovi, a cousin of Jon Bon Jovi, engineering and co-producing. After a massive house cleaning on so-called 'Black Friday', when 200 staffers at CBS, Epic and Portrait were let go, Balance would lose their supporters at the label and In For The Count became a direct casualty of the turnover.

Although things looked bleak at home, the band experienced one last hurrah when they were asked to write a song for a major Japanese commercial to launch the new Daihatsu Charade. The resulting song was "Ride the Wave" which was also commercially released through Polydor, with album leftover "She's Alone Tonight" on the B-side. Balance played a short tour of Japan before calling it quits due to lack of interest from their label and management company.

Castro, Katsaros, Burgi, and Feldman (along with Bob Kulick's younger brother, Bruce) reunited briefly when they appeared on Michael Bolton's 1985 album, Everybody's Crazy. Kulick and Feldman, the latter adopting the name Dennis St. James and handling lead vocals, would re-team again in the band Skull whose sole album, No Bones About It, was released in 1991; Bruce Kulick and Chuck Burgi guested on various tracks.

In the wake of the 2006 re-issue of In For the Count, Italian label Frontiers Records inquired about a possible new Balance album. Equilibrium was released in 2009 and features original core members Kulick, Castro and Katsaros, along with drummer Brett Chassen, who also co-produced with Kulick, as well as guest spots from Bruce Kulick on bass and Jesse Castro on drums.

In 2014, the band reunited for its first live shows in 31 years for a short three-date tour in Sweden. Peppy Castro, Bob Kulick and Doug Katsaros were joined by Dan Larsson on bass and Jonas Wikström on drums. Sweden Rock Magazine gave the band a rave review of their gig at the Rockland Club in Sala, Sweden, on August 26, 2014.

On October 6, 2015, Peppy Castro was interviewed by Swedish Radio about the continued and renewed interest in the band, such as fans of the band recently setting up a Facebook page wanting the band to play at Sweden Rock Festival in 2016.

Bob Kulick died on May 28, 2020, at age 70.

== Discography ==
=== Studio albums ===
Title	Album details	Chart
Title	Album details	US
Balance	Released: 1981; Label: Portrait	133
In for the Count	Released: 1982; Label: Portrait	—
Equilibrium	Released: 2009; Label: Frontiers Records	—
"-" denotes a recording that did not chart or was not released in that territory.

=== Singles ===
- 1981 "Breaking Away" b/w "It's So Strange" (Portrait, 24-02177) No. 22 US
- 1981 "Falling in Love" b/w "Fly Through the Night" (Portrait, 02608) No. 58 US
- 1981 "American Dream" b/w "I'm Through Loving You" (Portrait, 24-02826)
- 1982 "Slow Motion" b/w "Undercover Man" (Portrait AE7 1501)
- 1982 "Slow Motion" b/w "Is It Over" (Portrait, 24-03083)
- 1982 "In for the Count" b/w "Slow Motion" (Portrait/Epic Holland, PRTA 3185)
- 1983 "Ride the Wave" b/w "She's Alone Tonight" (Polydor Japan, 7DX 2027)

== Re-issues ==
- 1992 Balance (Portrait/Sony Music Austria, 4694422)
- 1992 In for the Count (Portrait/Sony Music Austria, 85787)
- 1996 Balance / In for the Count (Renaissance, RMED00104)
- 2006 In for the Count (Rock Candy, CANDY024)* includes the Japan only Ride the Wave 7" as bonus tracks
- 2010 Balance (Rock Candy, CANDY066)
