= Take Me Home (2011 film) =

2011 American romantic comedy film directed by Sam Jaeger

- Directed by: Sam Jaeger
- Written by: Sam Jaeger
- Produced by: Jane Kelly Kosek; Michael Hobert; Sam Jaeger
- Starring: Sam Jaeger; Amber Jaeger; Lin Shaye; Bree Turner; Brennan Elliott; Michelle Krusiec; Cristine Rose; Victor Garber
- Cinematography: Jesse M. Feldman
- Edited by: Damien LeVeck
- Music by: Bootstraps
- Production companies: Wonder Entertainment; Good Folk Films
- Distributed by: Monterey Media
- Release dates: April 19, 2011 (Nashville Film Festival); March 9, 2012 (United States)
- Running time: 97 minutes
- Country: United States
- Language: English

Take Me Home is a 2011 American romantic comedy film directed by and starring Sam Jaeger. The film also stars his wife Amber Jaeger, Lin Shaye, and Victor Garber. It premiered on April 19, 2011, at the Nashville Film Festival. Take Me Home was released to DVD on May 29, 2012.

== Plot ==
Thom Colvin is a down-on-his-luck photographer in New York. After failing to pay his rent, he comes back to his apartment to find the landlord putting all of his belongings into the hallway. Thom then drives his illegal taxicab under a fake name to earn some money.

Businesswoman Claire Barrow is stressed, as her marriage is on the rocks. She then finds out that her estranged father suffered a heart attack and is in a California hospital. Claire hails Thom's taxi. She breaks down crying and tells him to drive with no set destination. Claire falls asleep, and when she wakes up, they're in Pennsylvania.

Claire decides to go to California. She and Thom work out a deal where he will drive her there. They eat at a diner, where they get to know each other while continuing to bicker. At night, Thom falls asleep behind the wheel and nearly crashes the car. Claire decides to leave him but then discovers that she has lost her purse. Now broke, she asks Thom to drive her across the country for free. He refuses, and the two get into a physical fight in the car. When they wake up the next morning, Thom thinks about leaving Claire behind but changes his mind.

Thom drives several people around in his taxi to raise money. He and Claire continue on to Colorado. There, Thom sneaks into his parents' house to steal money, but Claire's presence forces him to show himself. Claire finds out Thom's real name and informs his parents that he's a taxi driver, which disappoints them.

After they leave Thom's parents, Claire drives the taxi for the first time. They both fall asleep, and Claire drives off the highway and into a field in the middle of nowhere, killing the car's engine. As Thom and Claire try to walk back to civilization, they argue, criticizing each other's life choices. They sleep outside at night. The next day, they get the taxi repaired, and Claire finds out that the vehicle is not registered with any company. Thom admits that he lied about that and several other things, and he promises not to do it again.

The two visit Claire's mother in Nevada. Claire's mother informs them that Claire's father died. Claire has a meltdown, and Thom consoles her. The next day, the three of them drive to California for the service. Claire's husband is already there, and he tells Claire that he wants to work through their problems.

The service takes place on a beach, and Claire scatters her father's ashes into the ocean. Claire's husband pays Thom the money that Claire owes him. Thom tells Claire that he's not going back to New York and that he wishes Claire could stay with him. Claire and her husband then fly back to New York.

Claire and her husband eventually separate, and Claire moves into an apartment. She receives a package from Thom. It's a book of his photography from traveling across the country, including a picture of Claire. She goes to Thom's house in California. Thom arrives home in his taxi, and they walk over to each other.

== Cast ==
- Sam Jaeger as Thom Colvin
- Amber Jaeger as Claire Barrow
- Victor Garber as Arnold (Thom's father)
- Cristine Rose as Lynette (Thom's mother)
- Lin Shaye as Jill (Claire's mother)
- Bree Turner as Eve (Claire's sister)
- Brennan Elliott as Eric (Claire's husband)

== Development ==
Jaeger began writing the script for Take Me Home in 2004, with the first draft taking him three months to complete and the second draft two years. Filming took place in 13 states, with Ohio initially set as the backdrop for the story.

== Reception ==
Connect Savannah and the Napa Valley Register both praised the film, with the Napa Valley Register calling it "truly engrossing and definitely funny".

== Awards ==
Year	Award	Category	Recipients and nominees	Outcome
2011	Napa Valley Film Festival Jury Awards	Mt Veeder Peak Performance	Amber Jaeger	Won
2011	Nashville Film Festival Awards	Naxos Award for Best Film Music	Bootstraps	Won
2011	Boston Film Festival Awards	Audience Favorite Award	Take Me Home	Won
2011	Rhode Island International Film Festival Awards	Audience Choice Award, First Prize	Take Me Home	Won
2011	Prescott Film Festival Audience Choice Award	Best Narrative Feature	Take Me Home	Won
2011	Reel Dakota Film Festival Audience Award	Best Feature	Take Me Home	Won
2011	Las Vegas Film Festival	Golden Ace Award	Take Me Home	Won
