= A... My Name Is Alice =

Musical revue

A... My Name Is Alice is a musical revue conceived by Joan Micklin Silver and Julianne Boyd, first produced in 1983. It won the Outer Critics Circle Award for Best Revue. It consists of some 21 songs by composers such as David Zippel, Doug Katsaros, Winnie Holzman, and Lucy Simon, along with scenes penned by Cassandra Medley, Marta Kauffman, Anne Meara, and others.

== Production history ==
The revue, a production of The Women's Project, played at "The Top of the Gate" at The Village Gate, New York City, from November 2, 1983, through November 14, 1983, and then opened in the basement space of The American Place Theatre, New York City, on February 24, 1984, through March 11, 1984. The revue returned to the Top of the Gate in May 1984 and ran for 353 performances.

The original Top of the Gate cast and The American Place Theatre cast both featured Roo Brown, Randy Graff, Mary Gordon Murray, Alaina Reed, and Charlayne Woodard. The revue was directed by Silver and Boyd and choreographed by Yvonne Adrian (Top of the Gate)/Edward Love.

=== Sequels ===
There are two sequels to this revue, both in the revue-sketch format, conceived and directed by Silver and Boyd:

- A...My Name Is Still Alice; premiered at the Old Globe Theatre, San Diego, California, on May 14, 1992; premiered in New York City at The Second Stage Theatre on November 22, 1992.
- A...My Name Will Always Be Alice, (also titled Alice Revisited) a combination of the two previous revues. Presented at the Barrington Stage Company, Great Barrington, MA (1995); The American Stage Festival, Milford, NH; and The Orpheum Theatre, Foxborough, MA.

== Revue format and premise ==
The format is that of a musical revue of 20 or so songs and sketches performed by a five-member cast of women of different ages and types in a 'wide variety of situations and relationships with insight, empathy and self-deprecating humour.’ The women have names in some of the sketches and songs, in others they are simply named "first actress", etc. Each of the cast members introduces herself by reciting an adult update on the children's ABC rhyme. One example: "A ... my name is Alice, And my husband's name is Adam, And his girlfriend's name is Amy, And my lover's name is Abby, And her husband's name is Arnie, And his boyfriend's name is Allan, And my analyst's name is Arthur, And we're working on my anger".

== Songs ==
Act I

- "All Girl Band" (Lyrics: David Zippel; Music: Doug Katsaros) – Company
- "A . . . My Name is Alice" (by Marta Kauffman and David Crane) – Company
- "At My Age" (Lyrics: June Siegel; Music: Glen Roven) – Vicky and Karen
- "Trash" (Lyrics: Marta Kaufman and David Crane; Music: Michael Skloff) –
- "For Women Only Poems" (by Marta Kauffman and David Crane) – Poetess
- "Welcome to Kindergarten, Mrs. Johnson" (Lyrics: Marta Kauffman and David Crane; Music: Michael Skloff) –
- "Pay Them No Mind" (by Calvin Alexander and James Shorter) –
- "I Sure Like the Boys" (Lyrics: Steve Tesich; Music: Lucy Simon) –
- "Bluer Than You" (Lyrics: Winnie Holzman; Music: David Evans) –
- "The Portrait" (by Amanda McBroom) –
- "Detroit Persons/Educated Feet" (by Susan Rice & Carol Hall) – Company

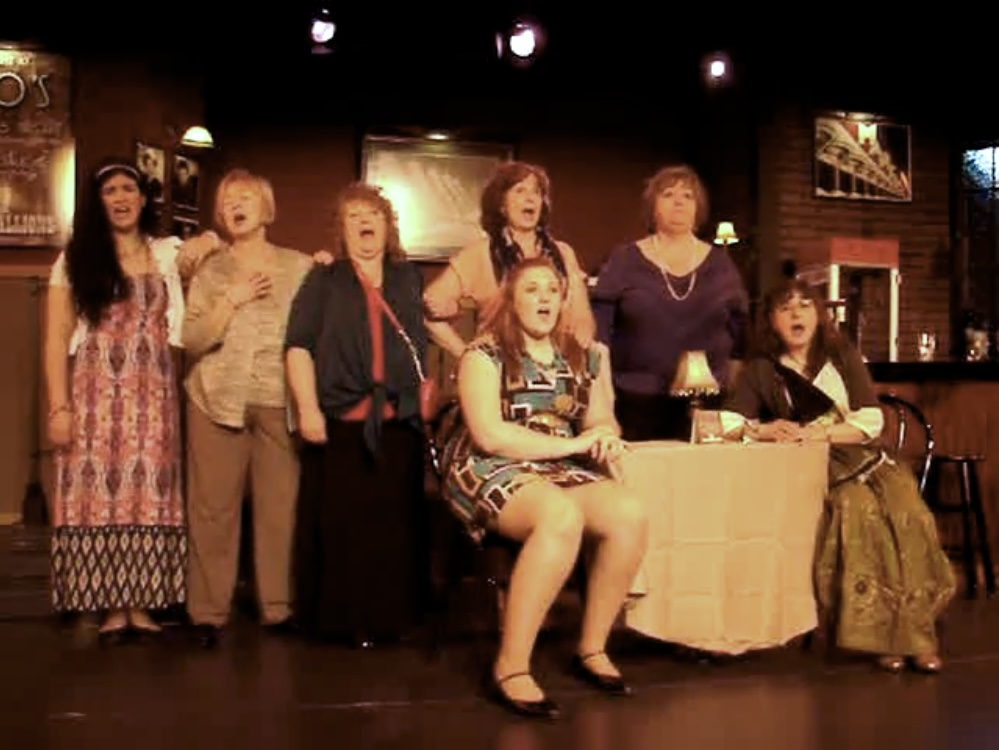
A 2013 production of A... My Name is Alice

ACT II

- "Pretty Young Men" (Lyrics: Susan Birkenhead; Music: Lucy Simon) –
- "Demigod" (by Richard LaGravenese) –
- "The French Monologue & Song" (by Art Murray; Lyrics and music by Don Tucker) –
- "Hot Lunch" (Anne Meara) –
- "Good Thing I Learned to Dance" (Lyrics: Mark Saltzman; Music: Stephen Lawrence) – "Actress" and Mother
- "Emily the M.B.A" (Lyrics: Mark Saltzman; Music: Stephen Lawrence) –
- "Sisters" (Lyrics: Maggie Bloomfield; Music: Cheryl Hardwick) –
- "Honeypot" (Lyrics: Mark Saltzman; Music: Stephen Lawrence) – "Honeypot Watkins" and "Therapist"
- "Friends" (Lyrics: Georgia Holof; Music: David Metee) –
- "All Girl Band (reprise)" (Lyrics: David Zippel; Music: Doug Katsaros) – Company

== Critical response ==
Frank Rich, reviewing for The New York Times, calling the revue "delightful", wrote: "Many of the songs are theater songs in the best sense: The music and lyrics are so sophisticated that they can carry the weight of one-act plays. A song called Friends recounts the entire history of a friendship that sustains two women from high school through marriage and old age; another, titled Sisters, provides a similar account of two women whose lifelong sibling rivalry at last reaches a bittersweet resolution in a lonely apartment in Queens. But even the show's flat-out comic turns can gain in complexity as they go along...the veteran directors who conceived and staged the show, have given it a warm, spontaneous ambiance. Though the performers and the audience share close quarters, the intimacy never becomes oppressive. Michael Skloff's piano accompaniment is spirited, and so are the vestpocket dance routines choreographed by Edward Love. To be sure, A . . . My Name Is Alice is a small-scale entertainment, but you're likely to emerge from its underground home feeling a real lift."
