= SIN-Atra =

Sin-Atra

Compilation album by Various artists
- Released: March 29, 2011
- Recorded: 2011
- Genre: Heavy metal
- Label: Eagle Records
- Producer: Bob Kulick and Brett Chassen

Professional ratings
Review scores
Source	Rating
Away Team	7/10 stars

SIN-Atra is a heavy metal compilation album by various artists, released as a heavy metal tribute album to Frank Sinatra. The album was produced by Bob Kulick (guitar/backing vocals) and Brett Chassen (drums/backing vocals), featuring Billy Sheehan (bass), Doug Katsaros (keyboards, orchestration), and various guest vocalists. This was the last compilation contribution released by Jani Lane before his death in August 2011.

== Track listing ==
#	Title	Vocalist
01	"New York, New York"	Devin Townsend
02	"I've Got You Under My Skin"	Glenn Hughes
03	"Summer Wind"	Geoff Tate
04	"It Was a Very Good Year"	Dee Snider
05	"Witchcraft"	Tim "Ripper" Owens
06	"Fly Me to the Moon"	Robin Zander
07	"The Lady Is a Tramp"	Eric Martin
08	"Strangers in the Night"	Joey Belladonna
09	"High Hopes"	Franky Perez
10	"I've Got the World on a String"	Doug Pinnick
11	"Love and Marriage"	Elias Soriano
12	"That's Life"	Jani Lane
