= Sam Jaeger =

American actor and screenwriter (born 1977)

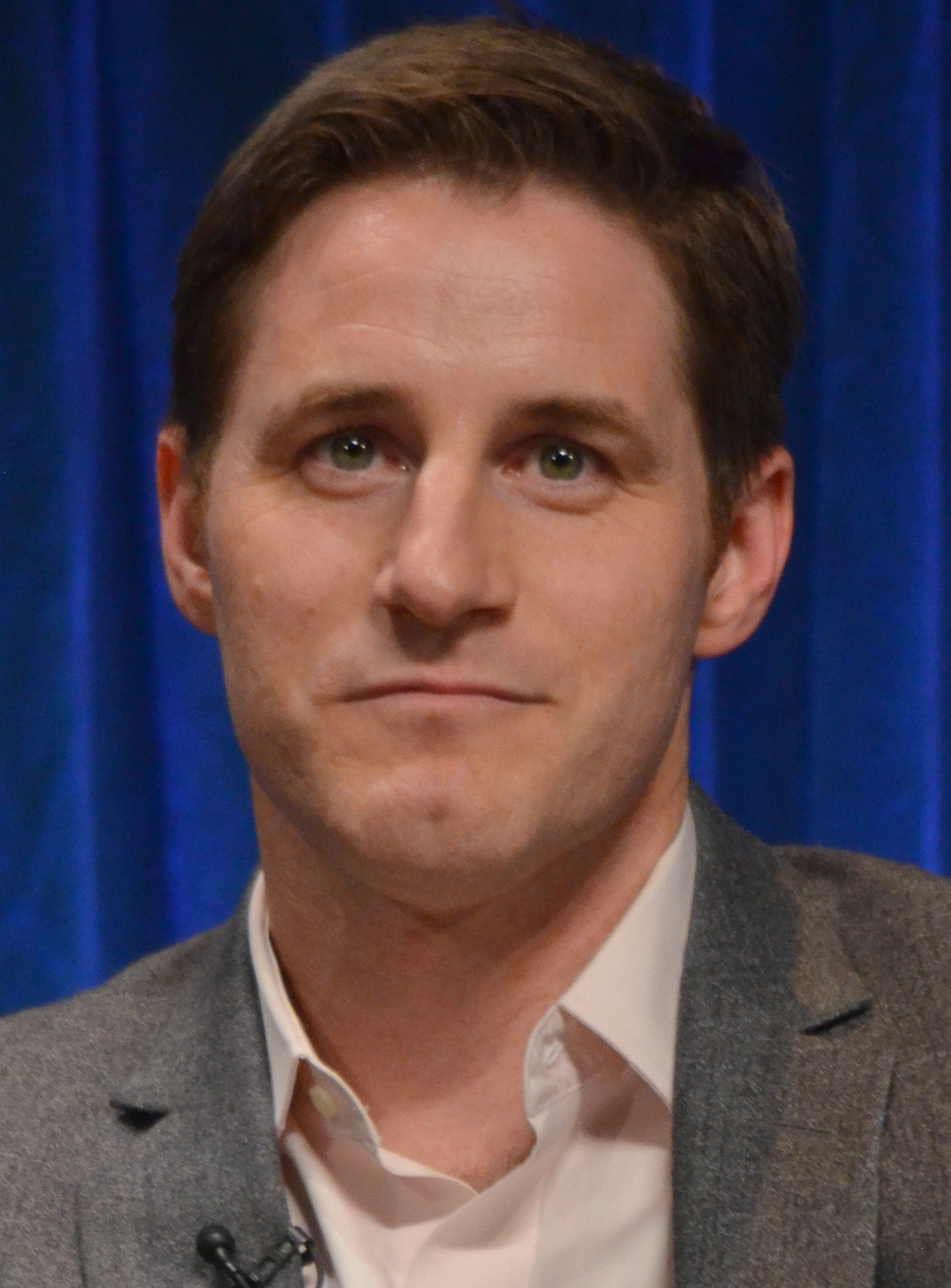
- Jaeger at the Paleyfest 2013
- Born: Samuel Heath Jaeger; January 29, 1977 (age 49); Toledo, Ohio, U.S.
- Occupations: Actor; screenwriter
- Years active: 1999–present
- Spouse: Amber Jaeger
- Children: 4

Samuel Heath Jaeger (born January 29, 1977) is an American actor and screenwriter.

== Life and career ==
Jaeger was born on January 29, 1977, in Perrysburg, Ohio, the son of LeAnne (née Graening) and Charles Jaeger. He is the youngest of four children. He graduated from Perrysburg High School in 1995; in 1999, he received a Bachelor of Fine Arts Degree from Otterbein College. Following his graduation, Jaeger worked in a casting office in New York. He married actress Amber Marie Mellott, whom he met at Otterbein College, on August 25, 2007. He has four children: August born in 2010, Redford born ca. 2014, Calvin born June 26, 2016, and a stepdaughter, Aubrey.

Jaeger started his acting career while still in college with a small guest role in New York-based TV series Law & Order (1990). He also acted on several theater stages in New York before moving to Los Angeles and Hollywood to act in full-length movies. His career gained speed with roles in well-known feature films, including Traffic (2000) and Behind Enemy Lines (2001). He also appeared alongside Bruce Willis and Colin Farrell in Hart's War (2002) as Captain R. G. Sisk. In 2009, Jaeger landed the role of Joel Graham in the NBC television drama Parenthood, which premiered in 2010. Additionally, he wrote, directed, and starred with his wife in the 2011 film Take Me Home.

Jaeger's television appearances include the role of Richard on the ABC miniseries When We Rise, the role of Tim Powell on Tell Me a Story, and the role of Rob Stanton on Why Women Kill. He was a recurring character, Mark Tuello, in Hulu's The Handmaid's Tale from 2018 to 2025.

== Filmography ==
=== Film ===
Year	Title	Role	Notes
2001	Behind Enemy Lines	Red Crown Operator #1	
2002	Hart's War	Capt. R.G. Sisk	
2002	Blood Work	Deputy	
2003	Advantage Hart	Colt Skyler	Short; also writer and producer
2004	Sexual Life	Jerry's best friend	
2006	Lucky Number Slevin	Nick Fisher	
2006	Catch and Release	Dennis	
2008	Henry Poole Is Here	Lance	Uncredited
2009	Within	Nathan Weiss	
2011	Take Me Home	Thom Colvin	Also director, writer and producer
2013	The Truth About Emanuel	Thomas	
2013	Miss Dial	Kyle	
2014	Inherent Vice	Agent Flatweed	
2014	American Sniper	Navy Seal Lt. Martin	
2016	Brave New Jersey	Paul Davison	
2017	S.W.A.T.: Under Siege	Travis Hall	
2019	Shazam!	Friend	Uncredited
2021	The Eyes of Tammy Faye	Roe Messner	
2025	Wolf Man	Grady Lovell	
2025	The Wilderness	James	

=== Television ===
Year	Title	Role	Notes
1999	Double Platinum	Waiter	Television film
1999	Law & Order	Bill Conway	Episode: "Admissions"
2000	The West Wing	Bill Kelley	Episode: "In This White House"
2001	ER		Episode: "Quo Vadis"
2001	That's Life	Andy Paulsen	Episode: "Something Battered, Something Blue"
2002	Girls Club	Kevin O'Neil	Main role
2003	Scrubs	Steve Larkin	Episode: "My Philosophy"
2003	CSI: Crime Scene Investigation	Kevin the bellman	Episode: "Lucky Strike"
2004	NYPD Blue	Kamal 'Tim Garrity' Muhammad	Episode: "Passing the Stone"
2004	The Riverman	Dave Reichert	Television film
2006	Commander in Chief	Vince's partner	Episode: "Ties That Bind"
2006	More, Patience	Tom	Television film
2007	Notes from the Underbelly	Tom	Episode: "Heather's Visit"
2008–2009	Eli Stone	Matt Dowd	Main role
2009	Drop Dead Diva	Barry Schuester	Episode: "Lost and Found"
2009	Friday Night Lights	Doug	Episode: "In the Skin of a Lion"
2010–2015	Parenthood	Joel Graham	Main role; also director
2015	October Kiss	Ryan Larson	Television film
2015	Lumen	Michael Hartman	Television film
2016	Poor Richard's Almanack	Darwin	Television film
2017	When We Rise	Richard	Miniseries
2017	Law & Order True Crime: The Menendez Murders	Detective Les Zoeller	8 episodes
2018	Reverie	Dr. Chris Condera	3 episodes
2018–2019	Tell Me a Story	Tim Powell	Main role
2018–2025	The Handmaid's Tale	Mark Tuello	Recurring role
2019	Why Women Kill	Rob Stanton	Main role
2019–2020	The Politician	Tino	Recurring role
2022	Devil in Ohio	Peter	Main role
2026	The Testaments	Mark Tuello	Cameo (voice only)

=== Music videos ===
Year	Title	Artist	Role	Ref.
2019	"Whenever You're Around"	Bootstraps	Man	
