= Audiodog =

Studio album by Bruce Kulick
- Released: October 23, 2001
- Studio: Cheyenne Recording Studios, Woodland Hills, CA
- Genre: Hard rock Heavy Metal
- Length: 44:28
- Label: Perris Records
- Producer: Bruce Kulick; Curt Cuomo

Bruce Kulick chronology
Audiodog (2001)	Transformer (2003)

Professional ratings
Review scores
Source	Rating
Allmusic	3.5/5 stars

Audiodog is the first solo album by former Kiss guitarist Bruce Kulick, released October 23, 2001 by Perris Records. The album was produced by Bruce Kulick and Curt Cuomo, and features Kulick on bass, guitar and vocals, and Cuomo on keyboards and backing vocals. Brent Fitz, with whom Kulick had worked before in the band Union, plays drums on all but two songs, which feature longtime John Mellencamp drummer Kenny Aronoff. Kulick and Cuomo composed, engineered and mixed the album, and it was mastered by Don C. Tyler. Chuck Wright did graphic design and illustrations, with photography by Glen LaFerman.

AllMusic's Greg Prato gave the album 3.5 out of 5 stars; he compares Audiodog to other solo albums released by previous and current members of Kiss around the same time, saying it "is certainly one of the better ones." Prato's review is quoted in Encyclopedia of KISS: Music, Personnel, Events and Related Subjects, as he credits Kulick with:

...present[ing] an album that -- rather expectedly -- doesn't stray far from the renowned Kiss sound. Although his songwriting contributions while a member of Kiss were never as pronounced as those by founding members Paul Stanley and Gene Simmons, he has certainly absorbed their songwriting styles, as most of the tracks on Audio Dog would've sounded right at home on a late '80s or early '90s Kiss release.

The name Audiodog derives from the home studio setting where the album was recorded, with Kulick's dog Joe close by throughout the process. In 2012, a limited edition version of the album was released to commemorate Joe's passing. The re-release included additional tracks "495" (an instrumental from the original EP) and the acoustic, aptly named "Bruce Sings To Joe".

== Track listing ==
All songs written by Curt Cuomo and Bruce Kulick except where noted. Brent Fitz played drums on all tracks except where noted.

No.	Title	Writer(s)	Drums	Length
1.	"Pair of Dice" (instrumental)	Bruce Kulick		3:23
2.	"Strange to Me"			4:37
3.	"Change Is Coming"			4:57
4.	"Need Me"			3:25
5.	"I Don't Mind"			4:14
6.	"Monster Island" (instrumental)	Bruce Kulick		3:47
7.	"Please Don't Wait"			3:31
8.	"Liar" (instrumental)	Bruce Kulick		4:16
9.	"I Can't Take"			3:14
10.	"Dogs of Morrison"		Kenny Aronoff	3:46
11.	"Skydome" (instrumental)	Bruce Kulick	Kenny Aronoff	5:18
Total length:				44:28

Additional tracks on Limited Edition release:

No.	Title	Length
12.	"495" (instrumental)	4:38
13.	"Bruce Sings to Joe"	2:29
Total length:		51:35

== Personnel ==
- Bruce Kulick - bass, guitar, vocals
- Curt Coumo - keyboards, backing vocals
- Kenny Aronoff - drums
- Brent Fitz - drums
