= Diamonds (musical) =

Musical revue about baseball

- A new musical revue
- Album Cover
- Music: Gerard Alessandrini; Craig Carnelia; Cy Coleman; Larry Grossman; John Kander; Doug Katsaros; Alan Menken; Jonathan Sheffer; Lynn Udall; Albert Von Tilzer; Jim Wann
- Lyrics: Gerard Alessandrini; Howard Ashman; Craig Carnelia; Betty Comden; Fred Ebb; Ellen Fitzhugh; Adolph Green; Karl Kennett; Jack Norworth; Jim Wann; David Zippel
- Book: Bud Abbott; Ralph G. Allen; Roy Blount, Jr. Richard Camp; Jerry L. Crawford; Lou Costello; Lee Eisenberg; Sean Kelly; Jim Wann; John Lahr; Arthur Masella; Harry Stein; John Weidman; Alan Zweibel
- Productions: 1984 Off Broadway

Diamonds is a musical revue about baseball. The book and music were created by many writers, composers, and lyricists. Among them were Ellen Fitzhugh, Roy Blount, Jr., Alan Zweibel, and John Weidman (book); and Larry Grossman, Comden and Green, Howard Ashman, Alan Menken, Kander and Ebb, and Cy Coleman, music.

The musical ran Off Broadway at the Circle in the Square Downtown theater, beginning on December 16, 1984, and closing on March 31, 1985, after 122 performances. The production was directed by Broadway veteran Harold Prince. The cast included Loni Ackerman, Susan Bigelow, Jackée Harry, Scott Holmes, Dick Latessa, Dwayne Markee, Wade Raley, Larry Riley, Nestor Serrano, Gordon Stanley and Chip Zien.

The musical won the Outer Critics Circle Award for Best Set Design, by Tony Straiges.

== Songs ==
- Winter In New York (music: John Kander, lyrics: Fred Ebb)
- In The Cards (music: Alan Menken, lyrics: David Zippel)
- Favorite Sons (music: Larry Grossman, lyrics: Ellen Fitzhugh)
- Song for a Pinch Hitter (music: Larry Grossman, lyrics: Ellen Fitzhugh)
- Vendors (music: Cy Coleman, lyrics: Betty Comden and Adolph Green)
- What You'd Call a Dream (music and lyrics: Craig Carnelia)
- Escorte-Moi (music and lyrics: Albert Von Tilzer and Jack Norworth)
- He Threw Out The Ball (music: Larry Grossman, lyrics: Ellen Fitzhugh)
- Hundreds of Hats (music: Jonathan Sheffer, lyrics: Howard Ashman)
- 1919 (music and lyrics: Jim Wann)
- Let's Play Ball (music and lyrics: Gerard Alessandrini)
- Vendors #2 (music: Cy Coleman, lyrics: Betty Comden and Adolph Green)
- The Boys of Summer (music: Larry Grossman, lyrics: Ellen Fitzhugh)
- Song for a Hunter College Graduate (music: Jonathan Sheffer, lyrics: Howard Ashman)
- Stay in Your Own Back Yard (music: Lyn Udall, lyrics: Karl Kennett, additional music: Pam Drews)
- Ka-Razy (music: Doug Katsaros, lyrics: David Zippel)
- Diamonds Are Forever (music: John Kander, lyrics: Fred Ebb)

== Critical response ==
The Christian Science Monitor gave the musical a positive review, calling the "good-natured celebration of baseball" a hit but not a home run. The Los Angeles Times quoted several reviews of the piece:

Is it a hit? Will it have a run? Frank Rich of the New York Times didn't particularly think so. Clive Barnes of the New York Post definitely thought not: 'A fiasco of the smallest, dullest kind. Say it ain't so, Hal.' But the Daily News Doug Watt thought the show had some cute ideas, such as its Kabuki-style rendering of 'Casey at the Bat.' His final verdict: 'Call 'Diamonds' a Little League homer and let it go at that.'"
