= Everybody's Crazy =

Studio album by Michael Bolton
- Released: March 15, 1985
- Recorded: August–December 1984
- Studios: Power Station, Electric Lady Studios, The Hit Factory and Delta Recording Studios (New York City, New York)
- Genres: Glam metal; hard rock
- Length: 37:12
- Label: Columbia
- Producers: Neil Kernon; Michael Bolton; Randy Goodrum (track 6 only)

Michael Bolton chronology
| Michael Bolton (1983) | Everybody's Crazy (1985) | The Hunger (1987) |

Everybody's Crazy is the fourth studio album by American recording artist Michael Bolton. The album was released on March 15, 1985, by Columbia Records.

The lead guitarist on the album is Bruce Kulick, later of Kiss fame. After Kulick left to join Kiss in late 1984, Kevin Reye/Reyes (Black Sheep, Fortress, White Lie/TRIIX, Martial Law, Network, Power Squadron, Zodiac) replaced him on guitar for post album support and performed in the CBS/Columbia MTV video of the title track, produced and directed by Wayne Isham and Curt Marvis of the New Company. The title track was a minor hit on hard rock radio stations, and the MTV video of the title track was also featured in the 1986 Rodney Dangerfield movie Back to School. The album was reissued overseas in the mid-1990s with a then-current photo of Bolton on the cover. It was reissued again on CD in the UK on February 25, 2008, by Rock Candy Records with a 12-page full colour booklet with original and new artwork.

Given the contrast in musical style between this album and the majority of Bolton's later (and more successful) musical output, songs from the album rarely appear on Bolton compilations. However, the title track was included on Bolton's entry in the Playlist series of Greatest Hits compilations.

== Background ==
Producer Neil Kernon described how he became involved with the album: "Well, I got a call from Michael's manager asking me if I'd be interested. I'd heard 'Fools Game' [from his previous album, Michael Bolton] and liked that, so we met and hit it off straight away. Michael was one of the funniest people I've ever met." Kernon also said that later on, Bolton did not want to re-release Everybody's Crazy or his self titled 1983 album on CD for fear of confusing and alienating fans of his later adult contemporary music.

== Reception ==
Professional ratings
Review scores
| Source | Rating |
|---|---|
| AllMusic | 1/5 stars |
| Record Collector | 3/5 stars |

In their retrospective review, AllMusic criticized Everybody's Crazy for muting Bolton's distinctive vocals, remarking that "much of the time he seemed to be fighting to be heard, and when he was, all he had was a mouthful of cliches to offer."

The album has an average rating of 88/100 on the hard rock/AOR database Heavy Harmonies.

== Track listing ==
| No. | Title | Writer(s) | Length |
|---|---|---|---|
| 1. | "Save Our Love" | Michael Bolton, Mark Mangold | 4:05 |
| 2. | "Everybody's Crazy" | Bolton | 4:42 |
| 3. | "Can't Turn It Off" | Bolton, Mangold | 3:58 |
| 4. | "Call My Name" | Bolton, Mark Radice | 4:14 |
| 5. | "Everytime" | Bolton, Mangold | 3:45 |
| 6. | "Desperate Heart" | Bolton, Randy Goodrum | 3:59 |
| 7. | "Start Breaking My Heart" | Bolton, Radice | 4:34 |
| 8. | "You Don't Want Me Bad Enough" | Bolton | 3:49 |
| 9. | "Don't Tell Me It's Over" | Bolton, Jan Mullaney | 4:00 |
| Total length: | | | 37:12 |

== Personnel ==
- Michael Bolton – lead vocals, backing vocals, additional guitars, arrangements (1, 3, 5)
- Larry Fast – synthesizer programming
- Lloyd Landesman – keyboards
- Mark Mangold – keyboards, arrangements (1, 3, 5)
- Jan Mullaney – keyboards
- Mark Radice – keyboards
- Allan St. John – keyboards
- Doug Katsaros – additional keyboards
- Neil Kernon – additional keyboards
- Randy Goodrum – keyboard and synthesizer programming, drum programming, backing vocals (all on 6 only)
- Bruce Kulick – lead guitars (1–5, 7–9)
- Kevin Dukes – guitars (6)
- Paul Pesco – additional guitars (6)
- Dennis Feldman – bass, backing vocals
- Schuyler Deale – additional bass
- Chuck Burgi – drums (uncredited on the original release, but credited in the reissue)
- Mark Rivera – saxophones
- Terry Brock – backing vocals
- Peppy Castro – backing vocals
- Joe Cerisano – backing vocals

== Production ==
- Louis Levin – executive producer, direction
- Neil Kernon – producer (1–5, 7–9), mixing (1–3, 5, 7–9)
- Michael Bolton – co-producer (1–5, 7–9), mixing (4)
- Randy Goodrum – producer (6)
- John Abbey – engineer
- Bruce Buchalter – engineer
- Bobby Cohen – engineer, mixing (4)
- John Davenport – engineer
- Bruce Lampcov – engineer
- Andrew Milano – engineer
- Malcolm Pollack – engineer
- Michael Sommers-Abbott – assistant engineer
- Jay Graydon – additional overdub engineer at Garden Rake Studios (Sherman Oaks, California)
- Larold Rebhun – additional engineer
- Jan Mullaney – mixing (4)
- Elliot Scheiner – mixing (6) at Soundcastle Recorders (Los Angeles, California)
- Paul Ericksen – assistant mix engineer (6)
- Bruce Friedman – studio maintenance for Electric Lady Studios
- Bob Ludwig – mastering at Masterdisk (New York City, New York)
- Randee St. Nicholas – photography
- Fleur Thiemeyer – stylist
- David Krebs – direction association for Contemporary Communications Corporation
- Steve Leber – direction association for Contemporary Communications Corporation

2008 Reissue credits

- Hugh Gilmour – design
- Jon Astley – remastering at Close To The Edge (Twickenham, UK)
- Louis Levin – archive photos
- Derek Oliver – liner notes

== Music videos ==
| Year | Video | Director | Producer | Production company | Label | Personnel | Featured In |
|---|---|---|---|---|---|---|---|
| 1985 | "Everybody's Crazy"(Michael Bolton) | Wayne Isham | Curt Marvis | The New Company | CBS/Columbia | Michael Bolton (vocals), Kevin Reyes (guitar), (bass), (drums) | MTV standard rotation 1985–1987, Rodney Dangerfield's 1986 movie Back to School, and MTV's Beavis and Butt-Head Episode 142 "Green Thumbs" October 11, 1995 |

== Cover versions ==
- Starship covered "Desperate Heart" for their 1985 album Knee Deep in the Hoopla.
- Jennifer Rush covered "Call My Name" (with slightly altered lyrics, thus earning Rush a co-writing credit on her version) for her 1987 album Heart Over Mind.

== Charts ==
Chart performance for Everybody's Crazy
| Chart (1985) | Peak position |
|---|---|
| Swedish Albums (Sverigetopplistan) | 45 |
