= Advantage Hart =

- Directed by: Jeff Seibenick
- Written by: Michael Hobert; Sam Jaeger
- Produced by: Michael Hobert; Sam Jaeger
- Starring: Shad Hart; Sam Jaeger; Sam Lloyd; Kate Bosworth; Amber Mellott
- Cinematography: Terrence Hayes
- Edited by: Zene Baker; Jeff Seibenick
- Music by: Nathan Lanier
- Release date: 19 October 2003
- Running time: 34 minutes
- Country: United States
- Language: English

Advantage Hart is a 2003 American short film directed by Jeff Seibenick. It stars Shad Hart, Sam Jaeger, Sam Lloyd, Kate Bosworth, and Amber Mellott.

It was written and produced by Michael Hobert and Sam Jaeger.

== Premise ==
When tennis player Shad Hart goes to enter the Mayflower tournament to face his nemesis Colt Skyler, he learns that Skyler's father raised the entry fee to $500. With the help of friend Blaze and sister Chrystal he raises the money, but then the money is stolen.

== Cast ==
- Shad Hart as Shad Hart
- Sam Jaeger as Colt Skyler
- Sam Lloyd as Gus Blanderskud
- Kate Bosworth as Trinity Montage
- Amber Mellott as Piper Township
- Michael Hobert as Blaze Township
- Matt Czuchry as Clame Buckley
- Daniel Hobert as Brent DewBerry III
- Rae-Mi LeRoy as Chrystal Hart
- Jill Tracey as Beverlyglen Blanderskud

== Soundtrack ==
The film contains several songs by the band Drive, She Said.

== Screenings ==
The film had its premiere at The Hollywood Film Festival and toured on the film festival circuit.
