= The Blue Room (Union album) =

Studio album by Union
- Released: February 22, 2000
- Recorded: New York, New York
- Genre: Rock, Metal
- Length: 48:44
- Label: Spitfire
- Producer: Bob Marlette

Union chronology
Live at the Galaxy (1999)	The Blue Room (2000)

The Blue Room is the second and final studio album by rock band Union, released in 2000.

== Reception ==
Professional ratings
Review scores
Source	Rating
Allmusic	3.5/5 stars
Kerrang!	3/5 stars
Rock Hard	8/10
Soundi	3/5 stars

Greg Prato of Allmusic reviewed the album for the site, and stated that the music was not as catchy as the band members work in their other bands.

== Track listing ==
No.	Title	Writer(s)	Length
1.	"Do Your Own Thing"	Corabi, Kulick, Marlette, Hunting	4:32
2.	"Dead"	Corabi, Kulick, Marlette, Hunting	3:35
3.	"Everything's Alright"	Corabi, Kulick, Marlette, Hunting	5:17
4.	"Shine"	Corabi, Kulick, Marlette, Hunting	5:35
5.	"Who Do You Think You Are"	Corabi, Kulick, Marlette, Hunting	4:40
6.	"Dear Friend"	Corabi, Kulick, Marlette, Hunting	5:22
7.	"Do You Know My Name"	Corabi, Kulick, Marlette, Hunting	4:58
8.	"Hypnotized"	Corabi, Kulick, Marlette, Hunting	4:48
9.	"I Wanna Be"	Corabi, Kulick, Marlette, Hunting	5:20
10.	"No More"	Corabi, Kulick, Marlette, Hunting	4:37

== Personnel ==
Adapted from AllMusic.

Union

- John Corabi - Vocals, Guitar, producer
- Brent Fitz - Drums
- Jamie Hunting - Bass
- Bruce Kulick - Guitar, Co-lead vocals on "Dear Friend", producer

Production

- Stephan Hanuman - Engineer
- Bob Marlette - Producer, Engineer, Mixing
- Don C. Tyler - Mastering
- German Villacorta - Assistant Engineer
