= Bob Kulick =

American guitarist (1950–2020)

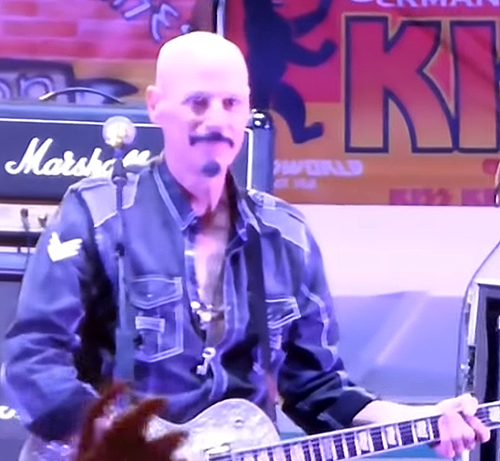
- Kulick at KISS Kruise VII 2017

Background information
- Born: Robert Joel Kulick; January 16, 1950; Brooklyn, New York, U.S.
- Died: May 28, 2020 (aged 70) Las Vegas, Nevada, U.S.
- Genres: Hard rock; glam rock; shock rock; heavy metal; pop rock; art rock; experimental rock; dance; jazz; disco
- Occupations: Musician; producer
- Instrument: Guitar
- Years active: 1965–2020
- Formerly of: Paul Stanley, Neverland Express, Meat Loaf, Michael Bolton, Lou Reed, Doro, Balance, Diana Ross, Tim Curry, Alice Cooper, Mark Farner, Janis Ian, Was (Not Was), Kris Hadlock, Spys, Blackthorne, David Glen Eisley, Skull, Michael Wendroff, Random Blues Band

Robert Joel Kulick (January 16, 1950 – May 28, 2020) was an American guitarist who worked with numerous acts such as Kiss, W.A.S.P., Alice Cooper, Lou Reed, Meat Loaf, and Michael Bolton. He was born in Brooklyn, New York, and was the elder brother of former Kiss lead guitarist Bruce Kulick.

== Early career and Kiss ==
Bob Kulick took a chance in late 1972 and auditioned for the lead guitar spot in a then-new band called Kiss. The band, with Gene Simmons, Paul Stanley, and Peter Criss, was very impressed by his performance, however the glitzier Ace Frehley (who auditioned immediately after him) was chosen to fill the spot. Kulick later played (uncredited) on three Kiss albums: Alive II (three of the five studio tracks), Killers (all four new studio tracks), and some minimal work on Creatures of the Night. He also played on Paul Stanley's 1978 solo album and on his 1989 solo tour.

== Other work ==
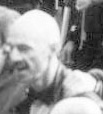
Kulick in 1986

Early in his session career, Bob Kulick played lead guitar for Lou Reed on his Coney Island Baby record. Kulick and brother Bruce both played in singer Michael Bolton's (née Bolotin) band at this time. Kulick then began a long-running stint in the Neverland Express, Meat Loaf's touring band, on and off for years, which led to appearances on several Meat Loaf albums, most notably on 1984's Bad Attitude. He also formed a band called Balance, with Peppy Castro (aka Emil "Peppy" Thielhelm, formerly of the Blues Magoos) and Doug Katsaros (multi-platinum recording arranger and Broadway conductor), which had modest chart success in the early 1980s, followed up by playing rhythm and lead guitar on Michael Bolton's 1983 self-titled album.

Bob Kulick was involved with a project called Skull, releasing one album, No Bones About It, in 1991. Bruce Kulick, his brother, who would become a member of Kiss, co-wrote one song and appeared as a guest guitarist on another track. In addition, Kulick played on the W.A.S.P. albums The Crimson Idol and Still Not Black Enough. He was only involved with the studio work and never toured with W.A.S.P. or became a member of the band. In 1996 he released Murderer's Row with his band of the same name. This group included David Glen Eisley (of Giuffria and Dirty White Boy) on vocals.

Thereafter, Kulick served in various side projects such as Blackthorne and Observation Balloon. He also produced Motörhead's "Whiplash" (winner of the 2004 Grammy Award for Best Metal Performance), produced and played guitar on the theme for WWE wrestler Triple H, and earned 11 platinum or gold records working with Kiss and Diana Ross. Kulick also composed, produced, and performed "Sweet Victory" with Eisley in the SpongeBob SquarePants episode "Band Geeks" on Nickelodeon. The song further appears on SpongeBob SquarePants: The Yellow Album.

== Personal life and death ==
In 1983, Kulick began a long-term relationship with actress Stella Stevens.

Kulick resided in Las Vegas, Nevada, and was a regular participant in the annual "KISS Night in Las Vegas" fundraiser for music programs in Clark County, Nevada schools until his death.

His family is of Jewish background.

Kulick's death on May 28, 2020, was confirmed by his brother Bruce. On October 2, 2020, Bruce stated that his brother had died of heart disease, with the pandemic possibly having delayed treatment.

== Discography ==
=== Random Blues Band ===
- Winchester Cathedral (1966)

=== Hookfoot ===
- Good Times A' Comin' (1972; Kulick only plays on "Sweet Sweet Funky Music")

=== Michael Wendroff ===
- Southpaw (1974)
- Recorded Live (1976)
- Kiss The World Goodbye (1978)

=== Lou Reed ===
- Coney Island Baby (1975)

=== KISS ===
- Alive II (1977)
- Paul Stanley (1978)
- Unmasked (1980)
- Killers (1982)

=== Balance ===
- Balance (1981)
- In For the Count (1982)
- Equilibrium (2009)

=== Meat Loaf ===
- Live at My Father's Place (1977; promo only release)
- Live at the "Bottom Line" in N.Y.C. (1977; promo only release)
- Live at the El Mocambo, January 18, 1978 (1978; promo only release)
- Bad Attitude (1984)
- Bad Attitude Live (1985; VHS)
- Live (at Wembley) (1987)
- Bat Out of Hell: The Original Tour (2009; DVD; televised appearance on Rockpalast, 1978)

=== Michael Bolton ===
- Michael Bolton (1983)

=== Diana Ross ===
- Why Do Fools Fall In Love (1981)
- Mirror Mirror (1981)

=== W.A.S.P. ===
- The Crimson Idol (1992)
- Still Not Black Enough (1995)

=== Skull ===
- No Bones About It (1991)
- No Bones About It: Expanded Edition (2018)
- Skull II: Now More Than Ever (2018)

=== Blackthorne ===
- Afterlife (1993)

=== Murderer's Row ===
- Murderer's Row (1996)

=== Doro ===
- Calling the Wild (2000)

=== Tim "Ripper" Owens ===
- Play My Game (2010)

=== Solo ===
- Skeletons in the Closet (2017)

=== Other ===
- Sweet Victory (2001) (Production music track famously used in the SpongeBob SquarePants episode "Band Geeks")

== Tribute albums ==
Bob Kulick produced or co-produced, with partners Bruce Bouillet, Billy Sherwood, and Brett Chassen, multiple tribute and original concept albums, including:

- Humanary Stew: A tribute to Alice Cooper (1996)
- Little Guitars: A Tribute to Van Halen (1999)
- Metallic Attack: Metallica – The Ultimate Tribute (2000)
- Bat Head Soup: A Tribute to Ozzy (2000)
- Stone Cold Queen: A Tribute (2001)
- An All Star Lineup Performing The Songs Of Pink Floyd (2002)
- One Way Street: A Tribute to Aerosmith (2002)
- Spin the Bottle: An All-Star Tribute to KISS (2004)
- Michael Schenker Group 'Heavy Hitters' classic rock covers (2005)
- Welcome to the Nightmare: An All-Star Salute to Alice Cooper (2005)
- An All-Star Tribute to Cher (2005)
- An All-Star Tribute to Shania Twain (2005)
- Numbers from the Beast: An All-Star Tribute to Iron Maiden (2005)
- Butchering the Beatles: A Headbashing Tribute (2006)
- Immortal Randy Rhoads: The Ultimate Tribute (2015)
- We Wish You a Metal X-Mas and a Headbanging New Year (2008, a heavy metal Christmas album created in association with Black Ion Music, a company co-owned by Kulick and talent manager Wendy Dio) — featuring a who's who of rock and roll royalty including Bruce Kulick, Ronnie James Dio, Alice Cooper, Tommy Shaw, Lemmy Kilmister, Dave Grohl, Vinny Appice, Chuck Billy, Billy F. Gibbons
- Sin-Atra (2011) An All Star metal tribute to Frank Sinatra
