= Bootstraps =

American musician

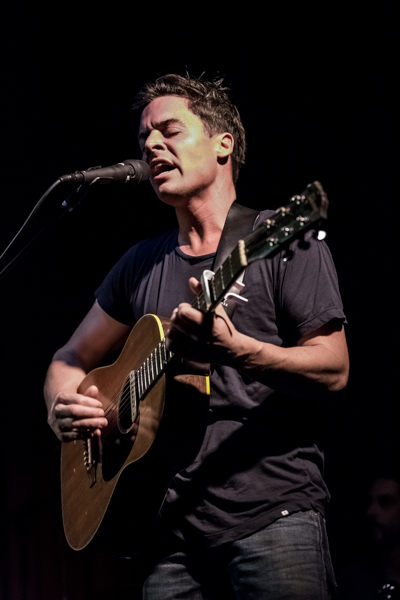

Background information
- Origin: Los Angeles, California
- Years active: 2011–present
- Labels: Harvest, Atelier
- Website: www.bootstrapsmusic.com

Jordan Beckett, known as Bootstraps, is an American musician, singer and songwriter from Portland, Oregon. Under the moniker Bootstraps, Beckett has released three studio albums, Bootstraps, Homage, and Demo Love. Bootstraps has also released one EP, To Each His Own. Critics have compared Bootstraps' music to the National, Bon Iver, Ray LaMontagne, Band of Horses, and Coldplay. Bootstraps produces and records out of Harmony Studios, in Hollywood, California.

== Early life ==
Beckett grew up in the Portland music scene, spending his teen years going to Elliott Smith, Death Cab for Cutie, and Modest Mouse shows. A friend of Beckett's gave him Lucinda Williams' album Car Wheels on a Gravel Road, which influenced his writing style, though it was not until college that he became serious about music.

A college baseball player, Beckett was injured, and while sidelined, he learned to play guitar. The Pacific Northwest's indie music scene provided the backdrop for Beckett's first steps into song writing and recording.

== Career ==
=== 2010 – 2011 ===
Beckett moved to Los Angeles in where he was approached by friend, actor/screenwriter Sam Jaeger, to write music for the film Take Me Home, which went on to win Best Music In A Film at the Nashville Film Festival in 2011.

=== 2012 – 2015: Bootstraps ===
Beckett recruited old friends Dave Quon and Nathan Warkentin of We Barbarians, to play on his self-titled debut album. The songs "Guiltfree," "Forty-Five," and "Revel" were placed on TV show Parenthood, and "Guiltfree" was also featured on the show Suits. In 2014, Bootstraps was re-released on Harvest Records.

In 2013, Amazon MP3 named Bootstraps their Rising Star.

In 2014, Bootstraps played Way Over Yonder Festival in Santa Monica, California, with Lucinda Williams and Local Natives. He performed a sold-out residency at Hotel Café in Los Angeles, and a well-received show at The Troubadour in West Hollywood. He was featured in Rolling Stone and performed on Ben Lovett's Communion tour.

He performed four songs at Daytrotter Studio in May, 2014 in Rock Island, IL, as featured in Paste Magazine. Later that year he was invited to perform at Yahoo Music Studios. The subsequent interview was picked up by Rolling Stone.

=== 2016: Homage ===
Homage, an album of re-interpreted covers, saw Bootstraps further his reach into film and TV placements. His version of Whitney Houston's "I Wanna Dance With Somebody" was featured in Grey's Anatomy, Supergirl, and in an ad for the Venice Film Festival. His version of Ben E. King's "Stand by Me" was placed in the Lionsgate blockbuster film Power Rangers, Lethal Weapon on Fox, and Hawaii 5-0 on CBS. His cover of Fleetwood Mac's "Everywhere" also appeared on Supergirl.

=== 2017: To Each His Own EP ===
Featuring six original songs, To Each His Own caught the ear of Taylor Swift, who chose "Replica" for her Spotify playlist, Songs Taylor Loves.

=== 2018: Homage: Deluxe Reissue ===
For the first time ever, songs with lyrics were permitted in the 2018 Pyonchang Winter Olympics. Czech figure skater sensation Michal Brezina chose Bootstraps’ cover of "Stand By Me" to perform to. Later that year, the song was featured on Dancing With The Stars, MacGyver, and Grey’s Anatomy.

On April 24, 2018, Bootstraps appeared on an unreleased cover of The Kinks song, "I’m Not Like Everybody Else" in the season two trailer for the History Channel series SIX. "Stand By Me" was featured in the trailer for the Clint Eastwood film Richard Jewell on December 13, 2019.

=== 2019: Demo Love ===
On October 18, 2019, Bootstraps released their second original LP titled Demo Love, based on a dichotomy of the word 'demo' meaning both, to demolish and to demonstrate. Melodic Magazine called it the "perfect fall album", while Buzzbands commented that "Singer-songwriter Jordan Beckett is a craftsman whose folk-pop has a filmic quality." Other reviewers described the record as "an indie folk triumph, telling a story from start to end" featuring "ethereal guitar tones, atmospheric piano" and "ushering in a new era for Beckett’s music."

The first single 'Evergreen' was released September 12, 2019 with Variance Magazine calling the song "captivating" with others musing, "Bootstraps has a very unique sound that we can’t seem to turn away from... 'Evergreen' has a perfect vibe."

The second single "Whenever You’re Around" was released with a music video featuring Alexandra Daddario and Erika Christensen. It was directed by his friend and frequent collaborator Sam Jaeger who revealed, "Bootstraps music is just easy to build stories around...it's just feels right for simple, understated moments. When I first heard ["Whenever You're Around"], I just thought of the early days of my relationship with my wife." The video premiered November 8, 2019 on Entertainment Tonight, TV Insider and Just Jared.

American Songwriter called the song and video direction, "brilliant, introspective" and "cinematic." Ear to the Ground concluded, "There’s a haunting humanity to the sound that Bootstraps produces on this track. The rasp in the vocal just fits the mood of the track perfectly. It kind of reminds me of what I first loved about William Fitzsimmons and Iron and Wine. That’s rare company, but deserved in the case of Bootstraps."

== Style ==
Bootstraps has drawn comparisons to Coldplay, Bruce Springsteen, and Ray LaMontagne. Paste concluded, "it could be the salty rasp of Jordan Beckett that does it to you, but Bootstraps leads you to believe that you’re one very prominent part of a fading photograph." This sentiment was echoed by Rolling Stone, who called Bootstraps' sound "fully formed, atmospheric and lived in."

== Awards and recognition ==
Bootstraps has received accolades throughout the music industry, including being named a Rising Star of 2013 by Amazon MP3 and being listed on elite top-10 Best Album of the Year. Hydrogen Magazine also listed Bootstraps as a Band to Watch, and they received the 2011 Best Music in a Film award at the Nashville Film Festival.

Year	Nominee / work	Award	Result
2011	Bootstraps	Best Music in a Film (Nashville Film Festival)	Won

== Discography ==
=== Studio albums ===
Title	Album details	Peak chart positions					
Title	Album details	US	AUS	AUT	CAN	SWE	UK
Bootstraps	Released: January 21, 2014; Label: Harvest Records	-	-	-	-	-	-
Homage	Released: April 15, 2016; Label: Atelier Records	-	-	-	-	-	-
To Each His Own EP	Released: December 15, 2017; Label: Atelier Records	-	-	-	-	-	-
Homage: Deluxe Edition	Released: September 7, 2018; Label: Atelier Records	-	-	-	-	-	-
Demo Love	Released: October 18, 2019; Label: HyperExtension	-	-	-	-	-	-
