= Union (band) =

American rock band

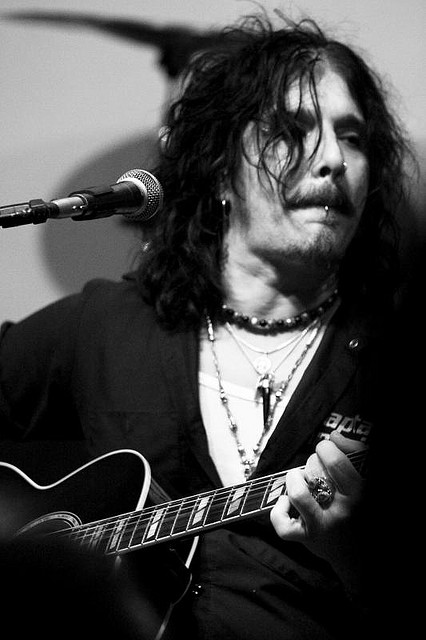
- John Corabi in 2010

Background information
- Origin: Los Angeles, California, U.S.
- Genres: Hard rock, rock and roll
- Years active: 1997–2002, 2005
- Labels: Mayhem, Spitfire, Cleopatra
- Past members: Bruce Kulick; Brent Fitz; John Corabi; Jamie Hunting

Union was an American rock group formed in Los Angeles in 1997 featuring lead vocalist and guitarist John Corabi (ex-The Scream and Mötley Crüe), guitarist Bruce Kulick (ex-Kiss), bassist James Hunting (David Lee Roth and Eddie Money), and drummer Brent Fitz (Slash).

== Formation ==
Union was formed when ex-Kiss guitarist Bruce Kulick, ex-Mötley Crüe vocalist and guitarist John Corabi, bassist James Hunting, and drummer Brent Fitz united to form a band. Kulick left Kiss after they decided to go back to their original lineup, and Corabi left Mötley Crüe under similar circumstances.

== Studio work ==
Union released two studio albums and a live album. Union, recorded in 1997 and released in 1998, which featured two singles: "Old Man Wise" and "October Morning Wind". Three versions of this CD were released. The first pressing of the disc omitted "Old Man Wise" from the cover art, but this was corrected in subsequent pressings. The second version, a Japanese import, included the bonus track "For You" with Kulick on lead vocals. The third was reissued with the bonus cover track of The Beatles' "Oh! Darling" sung by Corabi. The CD was co-produced by Corabi, Kulick and Curt Cuomo.

In 1998, a grass root effort, "The Union Work Force", spread out across the U.S. as the band toured small clubs from coast to coast. Kulick and Corabi took this a step further by performing at many of the Kiss Expo's doing acoustic versions of their songs. On a few occasions, Fitz and Hunting were able to join them.

In 1999, Live at the Galaxy, mixed by Bruce Bouillet and Kulick, was released. Recorded at The Galaxy Club, the CD features songs from the band's first CD, two Kiss songs ("Jungle" and "I Walk Alone" from Carnival of Souls), "Power to the Music" from Corabi's Mötley Crüe days, and "Man in the Moon" from The Scream. "Surrender", a Cheap Trick cover, and the added acoustic tracks "October Morning Wind" and The Beatles' "You've Got to Hide Your Love Away" proved the band's versatility.

The new millennium dawned on Union's second studio CD, The Blue Room, produced by Bob Marlette. The CD spawned two singles, "Do Your Own Thing" and "Who Do You Think You Are". The Blue Room Tour took the band through the U.S., Europe, Australia and Central America.

== Hiatus ==
By the end of 2000, one by one the band members began to get involved in other individual musical projects: Fitz toured and recorded with Guns N' Roses guitarist Gilby Clarke, Kulick joined Grand Funk Railroad as their guitarist, and Corabi joined Ratt as their second guitarist.

In 2001, both Fitz and Hunting joined Mötley Crüe vocalist Vince Neil as band members.

All of the band members are featured on the Bruce Kulick solo albums Audiodog (2001) and Transformer (2003).

In 2005, the group played together for the first time in about three years with two live shows in Japan. Fitz was unable to attend (due to touring commitments with the band Theory Of A Deadman), so Kulick's former Kiss bandmate and friend Eric Singer filled in. Also in 2005, Kulick oversaw the release of a Union DVD, Do Your Own Thing Live, containing two full-length live shows plus bonus material. In November and December 2005, Union toured in Europe to promote the DVD; Kulick and Corabi were joined by Chuck Garric and Fred Coury instead of Hunting and Fitz.

Corabi, Kulick and Singer also played together in the band ESP (Eric Singer Project).

== Recent work ==
Fitz became a member of the Canadian band Econoline Crush in 2008, as well as a touring drummer for Indigenous, Alice Cooper, and Ronnie Montrose.

Fitz also performed in Las Vegas with "Tinnitus", a band made up of several touring musicians from Blue Man Group, with Fitz playing keyboards and guitar.

In 2009, Kulick, Corabi and Fitz all performed in Las Vegas with the show Monster Circus. Fitz was keyboardist/bassist, Kulick on guitar, and Corabi on vocals and guitar.

In 2010, the band members featured together again on the Bruce Kulick solo album BK3 and Fitz joined Slash in his band as drummer.

In 2011, Jamie Hunting joined Roger Daltrey on the "Tommy Live" tour.

== Discography ==
- Union (1998)
- Live at the Galaxy (1999)
- Union (reissue - Spitfire 1999) *bonus song "Oh! Darling"
- The Blue Room (2000)
