= Bruce Kulick =

American guitarist (born 1953)

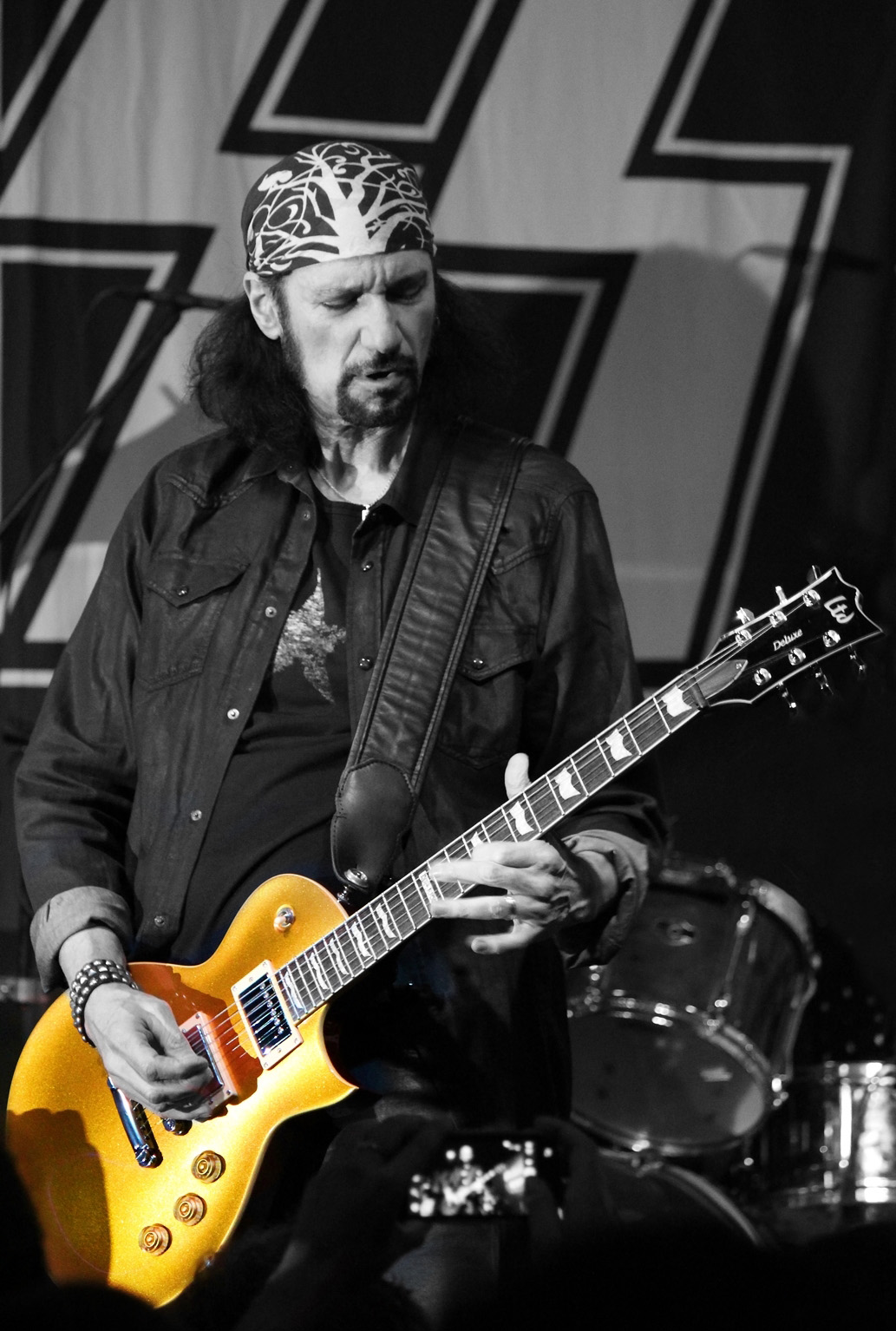
- Kulick in 2016

Background information
- Born: Bruce Howard Kulick; December 12, 1953 (age 72); Brooklyn, New York, U.S.
- Genres: Hard rock; heavy metal
- Occupation: Guitarist
- Years active: 1968–present
- Member of: Eric Singer Project
- Formerly of: KKB; Neverland Express; Blackjack; The Good Rats; Kiss; Union; Grand Funk Railroad
- Spouse: Lisa Kulick (m. 2014-present)
- Website: brucekulick.com

Bruce Howard Kulick (/ˈkjuːlɪk/; born December 12, 1953) is an American guitarist best known as a former guitarist of the band Kiss (1984–1996). He was also a member of Union with John Corabi from 1997 to 2002, Blackjack from 1979 to 1980 and Grand Funk Railroad from 2000 to 2023.

Kulick has also released several solo albums, in addition to session work with various artists. He is the younger brother of guitarist Bob Kulick.

== Early life and family ==
Kulick was born in Brooklyn, New York City and lived in Queens for a time, graduating from Newtown High School. He is Jewish and also went to Hebrew school.

Kulick's brother, session guitarist/producer Bob Kulick, was influential in his music career. Bob's performance credits include W.A.S.P., Meat Loaf's touring band, and Kiss.

== Career ==
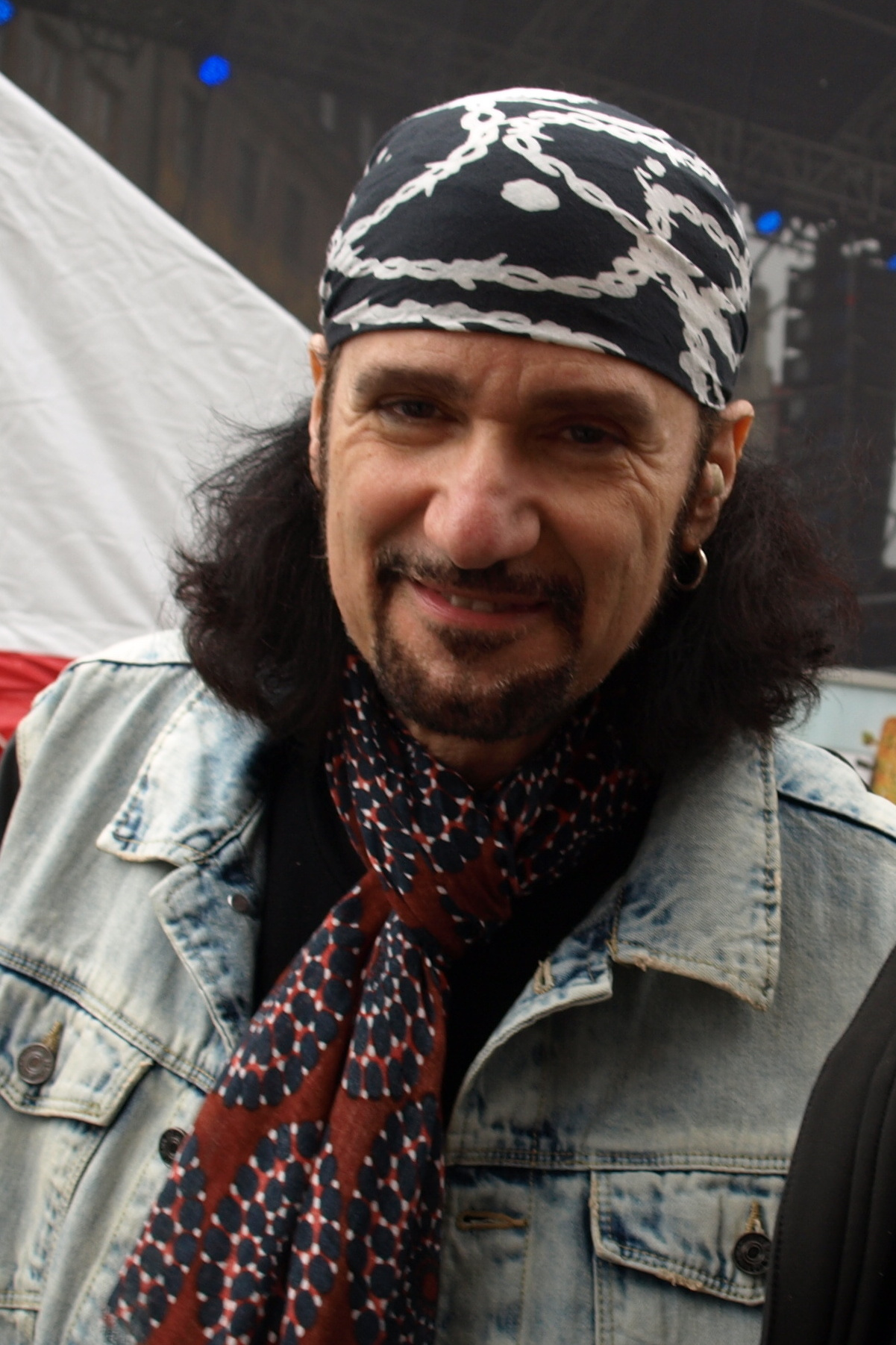
Kulick in 2013

=== Early projects ===
Bruce's first band KKB, was formed in 1974. Its other members were his childhood friends Mike Katz and Guy Bois (the other K and B of KKB, respectively) and Kulick likened its sound to that of Cream. Kulick found the master tape from those sessions in 2008 and issued it via limited edition CD, available during his appearances at Kiss expos and via his website. In an interview from 2008, Kulick also discussed his lifelong love of Star Wars and its historical similarities to Kiss.

He first began touring professionally with George McCrae and Andrea True.

=== Meat Loaf ===
In 1977, following the release of Meat Loaf's first album Bat Out of Hell, Kulick played rhythm guitar/lead guitar on tour with Meat Loaf's band alongside his brother Bob on lead guitar/rhythm guitar. The success of the year-long tour took the Kulick brothers around the world. In addition to the success of the tour, many famous television appearances were done, such as Saturday Night Live and The Old Grey Whistle Test.

=== Blackjack ===
Kulick was a member of the band Blackjack, with Michael Bolton, during the band's short existence from 1979 to 1980. He also played on several Bolton solo albums. (Bolton later co-wrote the Kiss song "Forever", from Hot in the Shade).

"Stay", a Blackjack song co-written by Kulick and Bolton, was sampled by rapper Jay-Z for the song "A Dream" off his 2002 album The Blueprint 2: The Gift & the Curse which reached #1 on the Billboard charts.

=== The Good Rats ===
Kulick joined the Long Island-based band the Good Rats in 1981, and is on their album, Great American Music.

=== Michael Bolton ===
In 1983, Bruce was asked to join Michael Bolton as his guitarist for his debut album release tour, after Bolton anglicizing his family name from Bolotin.

=== Kiss (1984–1996) ===
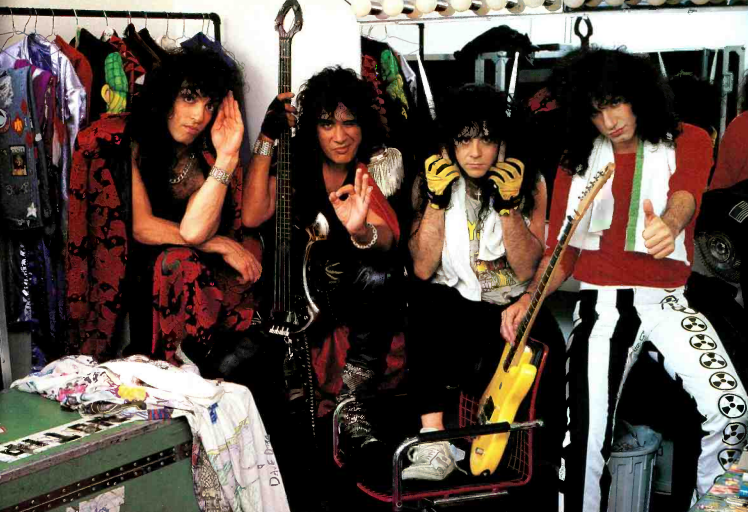
Kulick (right) with Kiss in 1988

Kulick joined the rock band Kiss in September 1984 as the lead guitarist, replacing Mark St. John, who left the band after being diagnosed with reactive arthritis. St. John later confessed that this medical condition had been a cover story for other unsaid reasons. Kulick, who remained with Kiss until 1996, and St. John are the only two members of Kiss never to have worn makeup or costumes in the band.

Kulick played on five Kiss studio albums: Asylum (1985), Crazy Nights (1987), Hot in the Shade (1989), Revenge (1992) and Carnival of Souls: The Final Sessions (1997); he also appeared on Alive III and MTV Unplugged. The song "I Walk Alone", from Carnival of Souls: The Final Sessions, is the only Kiss track to feature Kulick as lead vocalist. Kulick is featured on more than twenty Kiss releases.

When the original members of the band regrouped, starting in 1995 with the MTV Unplugged special that carried over into re-adopting their make-up and costuming for the Alive/Worldwide Tour in 1996, Kulick and Eric Singer were paid weekly during the tour; while "sidelined" from Kiss, both were allowed to do other projects as long as Simmons and Stanley okayed them. Kulick officially left Kiss in December 1996. When Ace Frehley again left Kiss (in 2002, after the Kiss Farewell Tour), Kulick was not asked to rejoin, as Simmons and Stanley thought that Tommy Thayer (former Black 'n Blue guitarist and Kiss tour manager) could capture/copy Frehley's persona better than Kulick; however, Kulick continued to work with Kiss after his departure, contributing work to the Psycho Circus album. Kulick briefly rejoined the band on Kiss Kruise 2021 and played on 2 songs, Tears Are Falling and Heaven's on Fire.

=== Union ===
Soon after leaving Kiss, Kulick formed the band Union with John Corabi, Brent Fitz, and Jamie Hunting in 1996. Corabi and Kulick wrote what would become the first album, the self-titled Union, which was released in 1998. They proceeded with a nationwide acoustic tour to promote the album, featuring just Corabi and Kulick (both on guitar). Soon the full band went on a world tour headlining small venues in support of the album. Their second album 1999's Live in the Galaxy, was a live recording with two acoustic tracks recorded in a mobile studio. The third Union album was The Blue Room (2000).

=== Grand Funk Railroad ===
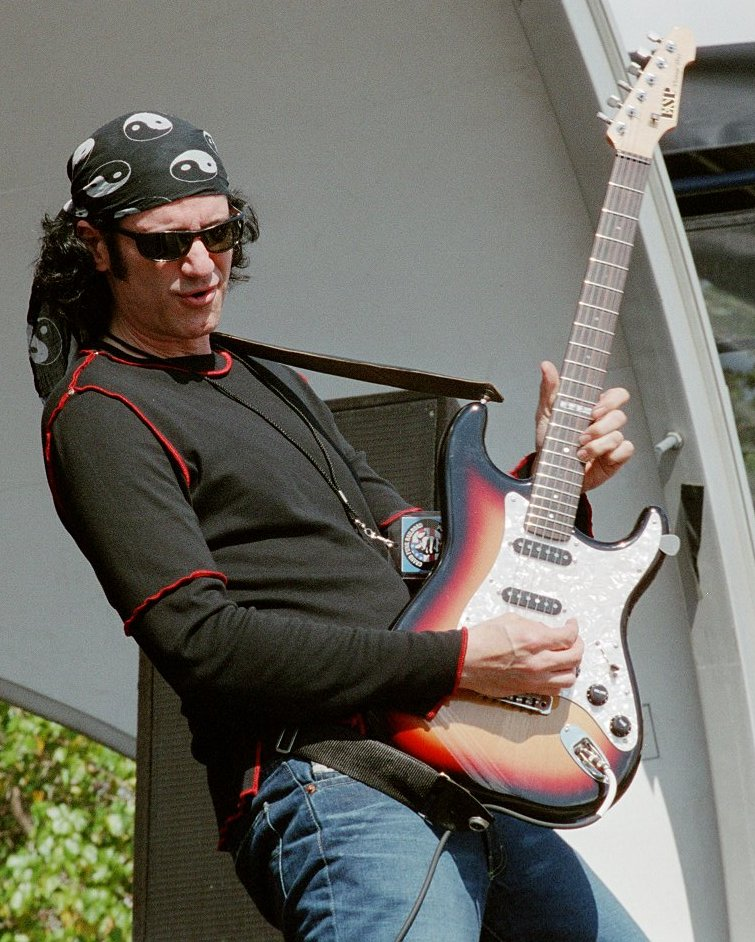
Kulick performing with Grand Funk Railroad in 2002

Kulick was the lead guitarist for Grand Funk Railroad from 2000–2023. Kulick had originally met Grand Funk Railroad drummer Don Brewer when Brewer was performing with Bob Seger during the 1983 tour with Michael Bolton. Following their December 14, 2023 concert in Marietta, Ohio, Kulick departed Grand Funk Railroad.

=== Solo work ===
Kulick has released three solo albums: Audiodog in 2001, Transformer in 2003, and most recently BK3, which was released on February 2, 2010.

=== Other work ===
Kulick earned a writing credit on the song "Never Let Me Down" on the 2004 Kanye West album, The College Dropout.

Kulick has also appeared on all album releases by Eric Singer's solo project ESP (Eric Singer Project): Lost and Spaced (1998), ESP (1999), and Eric Singer Project: Live in Tokyo (2006). Kulick also appeared on the DVD Eric Singer Project: Live at the Marquee (2006), which was filmed live in Australia.

Kulick appears on the Lordi March 2006 album The Arockalypse, playing lead guitar on the song "It Snows in Hell".

Kulick appears on Paul Stanley's 2006 album Live to Win, playing bass.

Kulick cut a guest guitar solo for the track "The Edge of the Razor" (featured on the album Emotional Coma) by Swedish metal group Lion's Share.

== Personal life ==
Bruce Kulick married his first wife, Christina Walker on September 24, 1989, and later divorced, with the marriage lasting until 1996.

On October 16, 2003, Kulick was shot twice by stray bullets on Sunset Boulevard in Los Angeles, California. Bruce is married to Lisa Lane Kulick. They met in 2008, and were married in 2014. They often perform together at events and online. In his spare time, he's been working on an autobiography that he says will offer a "really in-depth discussion of his life as a musician."

== Discography ==
=== with Mike Katz, Guy Bois ===
- KKB 1974 (2008)
- Got to Get Back (2015)

=== Rosetta ===
- Where's My Hero (1980)

=== with Billy Squier ===
- The Tale of the Tape (1980)

=== with Blackjack ===
- Blackjack (1979)
- Worlds Apart (1980)

=== with The Good Rats ===
- Great American Music (1981)
- Tasty Seconds (1996)

=== with Michael Bolton ===
- Michael Bolton (1983)
- Everybody's Crazy (1985)
- The Hunger (1987)

=== with Kiss ===
- Animalize (lead guitar on "Lonely Is the Hunter", opening guitar on "Murder in High Heels") (1984)
- Asylum (1985)
- Crazy Nights (1987)
- Smashes, Thrashes & Hits (1988)
- Hot in the Shade (1989)
- Revenge (1992)
- Alive III (1993)
- MTV Unplugged (1996)
- Carnival of Souls: The Final Sessions (1997)
- Psycho Circus (bass on "Psycho Circus", "Raise Your Glasses" and "I Finally Found My Way", lead guitar on "Within" and "Raise Your Glasses", all guitars and bass on "Dreamin'") (1998)
- Music from the Motion Picture "Detroit Rock City" (bass on "Nothing Can Keep Me from You") (1999)
- The Box Set (2001)

=== Kiss Video albums ===
- Animalize Live Uncensored (1985)
- Exposed (1987)
- Crazy Nights (1988)
- X-treme Close-Up (1992)
- Kiss Konfidential (1993)
- Kiss My Ass: The Video (1994)
- Kiss Unplugged (1996)
- Kissology Volume Two: 1978–1991 (2007)
- Kissology Volume Three: 1992–2000 (2007)

=== with Union ===
- Union (1998)
- Live in the Galaxy (1999)
- The Blue Room (2000)

=== with ESP ===
- Lost & Spaced (1998)
- Live in Japan (2006)
- Live at the Marquee DVD (2006)

=== Solo ===
- Audiodog (2001)
- Transformer (2004)
- BK3 (2010)

=== Other work ===
- Michael Wendroff – Kiss the World Goodbye (1978)
- Stevie – Gypsy! (1984)
- Ronnie Spector – Unfinished Business (1987)
- Don Johnson – Let It Roll (1989)
- Skull – No Bones About It (1991)
- Guitar's Practicing Musicians – Vol. II (1991)
- Blackthorne – Afterlife (1993)
- Tribute to Queen – Dragon Attack (1997) Lead guitar on "Save Me"
- Mark Mangold – Mystic Healer (1998)
- Graham Bonnet – The Day I Went Mad (1999)
- Shameless – Backstreet Anthems (1999)
- Boot Camp – As You Were (1999)
- Shameless – Queen 4 a Day (2000)
- Tribute to Van Halen – Little Guitars (2000) Produced by Bob Kulick.
- Ozzy Osbourne Tribute – A Tribute to Ozzy: Bat Head Soup (2000)
- Bret Michaels – A Salute to Poison (American band): Show Me Your Hits (2000)
- Eric Carr – Rockology (2000) Produced by Bruce Kulick.
- A Tribute to Metallica – Metallic Assault (2001)
- Meat Loaf – Bat Out of Hell (re-issue; 2001) guitar on bonus live tracks.
- Pink Floyd Tribute – An All-Star Lineup Performing the Songs of Pink Floyd (2002)
- Todd Rundgren – Re-Mixes (2003)
- Kiss Tribute – Spin The Bottle (2004)
- Chris Catena – Freak Out (2004)
- Gene Simmons – Asshole (2004)
- Bruce and Bob Kulick – KISS Forever (2005) Kiss Instructional DVD
- Tribute to Iron Maiden – Numbers from the Beast (2005) Guitar on Can I Play With Madness.
- Lordi – The Arockalypse (2006)
- Paul Stanley – Live to Win (2006)
- Michael Schenker – Doctor Doctor: The Kulick Sessions (2008)
- Led Box – The Ultimate Led Zeppelin Tribute: Dazed & Confused (2008)
- We Wish You a Metal Xmas and a Headbanging New Year (2008)
- Balance – Equilibrium (2009)
- Chris Catena – 'Discovery (2009)
- Lordi – Babez for Breakfast (2010)
- Avantasia – The Wicked Symphony (2010)
- Avantasia – Angel of Babylon (2010)
- Eric Carr – Unfinished Business (2011)
- Avantasia – The Mystery of Time (2013)
- Michael Jackson Tribute – Thriller: A Metal Tribute to Michael Jackson (2013)
- Tomas Bergsten's Fantasy – Caught in the Dark (2013)
- H. P. Lovecraft Historical Society – Dreams in the Witch House – A Lovecraftian Rock Opera (2013)
- Mocassin Creek – Friends of All Kinds (2013)
- DJ Peace – Do You Love Me? (Tribute to Kiss) (2014)
- Randy Rhoads Tribute – Immortal Randy Rhoads: The Ultimate Tribute (2015)
- Paco Ventura - Black Moon (2015) Guest on En tu piel
- Lita Ford – "Time Capsule"- "Rotten to the Core" (2016)
- Avantasia – Ghostlights (2016)
- ColdTears – "Silence Them All (2018) Lead guitar on "Miracle"
- Ace Frehley – Origins Vol. 2 – lead guitar on "Manic Depression" (2020)
- Dario Imaz - Vox Popurrí, Vol.I - lead guitar on "Ciudad Tóxica" (2023)

== Bibliography ==
- Sherman, Dale (2009). Black Diamond: The Unauthorized Biography of KISS (10th Anniversary ed.). Ontario, CANADA: CG Publishing Ltd. ISBN 978-1-894959-92-6.

Preceded by Mark St. John	Lead guitarist of Kiss; 1984–1996	Succeeded by Ace Frehley
