= Mark Mangold =

American singer-songwriter

- Born: Miami, Florida, United States
- Genres: Pop, pop rock
- Occupations: Singer-songwriter, keyboardist
- Instruments: Keyboards, piano
- Years active: 1975–present

Mark Mangold is an American pop singer-songwriter, producer and keyboardist. A member of the band Touch, as a songwriter Mangold's songs have been performed by Michael Bolton, Cher and Jordin Sparks, Paul Rodgers, Jennifer Rush and Laura Branigan.

== Career ==
Mangold was born in Miami and grew up on Long Island. He performed in Long Island bands Valhalla and American Tears before forming Touch in 1978, along with fellow American Tears members Glen Kithcart and Craig Brooks.

Touch charted with two Mangold-penned singles, “(Call Me) When the Spirit Moves You” in 1980 and “Don't You Know What Love Is” in 1981.

Mangold worked with Michael Bolton in the 1980s, co-writing and performing on Bolton's first hit "Fools Game" as well as several tracks from his 1985 AOR album, Everybody's Crazy. He and Bolton later co-wrote "I Found Someone", a top-ten hit for Cher and originally recorded by Laura Branigan. Mangold himself recorded a version on his solo album Lift (2001).

In 1991, the band The Law recorded "For a Little Ride", a Mangold song co-written with Benny Mardones for Atlantic Records.

The Sign were formed by Mangold, Randy Jackson (Zebra), Terry Brock (Strangeways), Billy Greer (Kansas) and Bobby Rondinelli (Rainbow & Black Sabbath). Their début album, released in 2000, was Signs Of Life. Their second album, The Second Coming was released in August 2005 on Frontiers Records.

Mangold has worked in Stockholm with songwriters, and released "My Confession" (co-written with Jon Bivona) and "Candelight" sung by Anniela on Hitworks Records. In Denmark, SukkerChok released Mangold's "1,000 Miles Away" which became a local hit. In 2003, Jordin Sparks recorded his song "I Will Be There", co-written with Pebe Sebert, on the For Now EP.

Mangold has written for and played keyboards in the New York band The Radiant.

Other projects include Ashlie Luckett, and the comedian Lauren Francesca on the "Comic Con" YouTube music video.

== Discography ==
=== American Tears ===
- Branded Bad (1974)
- Tear Gas (1975)
- Powerhouse (1977)
- Hard Core (2018)
- White Flags (2019)
- Free Angel Express (2020)

=== Touch ===
- Touch (1980)
- Touch II (1982)
- Tomorrow Never Comes (2021)

=== Drive, She Said ===
- Drive, She Said (1989)
- Drivin' Wheel (1991)
- Excelerator (1993)
- Real Life (2003)
- Pedal to the Metal (2016)

=== The Sign ===
- Signs of Life (2000)
- The Second Coming (2004)

=== Keys ===
- "When Shadows Fall" (2022)
- "The Grand Seduction" (2024)
