= John Corabi =

American singer and guitarist

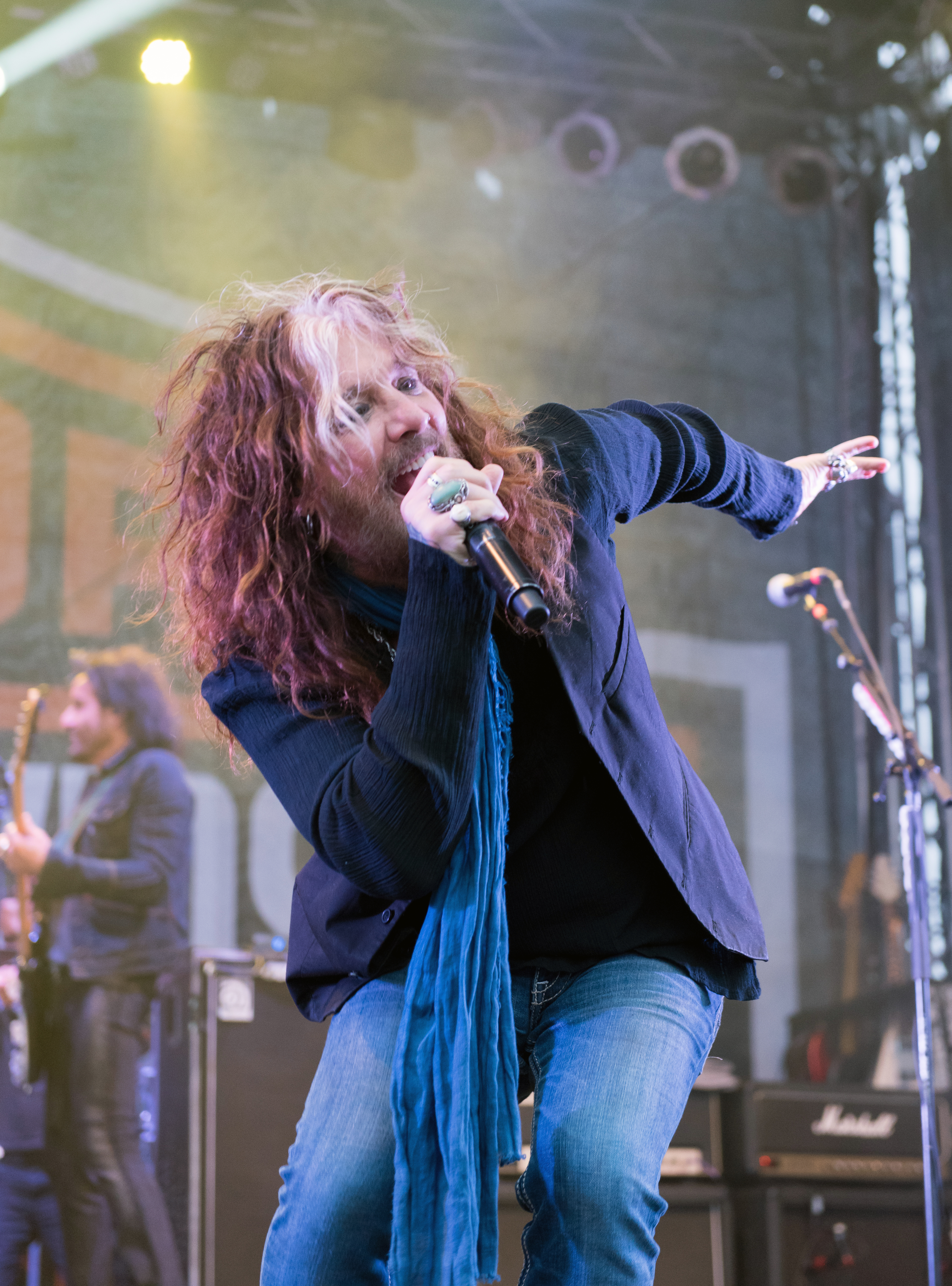
- Corabi with The Dead Daisies in 2017

Background information
- Born: April 26, 1959 (age 67); Philadelphia, Pennsylvania, U.S.
- Genres: Hard rock; heavy metal; glam metal
- Occupations: Musician; singer
- Instruments: Vocals; guitar
- Years active: 1988–present
- Member of: ESP; The Dead Daisies
- Formerly of: Mötley Crüe; The Scream; Ratt; Union; Brides of Destruction; Angora; Angel City Outlaws; Twenty 4 Seven; Cardboard Vampyres
- Website: johncorabi.com

John Corabi (born April 26, 1959) is an American hard rock singer and guitarist. He was the frontman of the Scream during 1989 and the frontman of Mötley Crüe between 1992 and 1996 during original frontman Vince Neil's hiatus from the band.

Corabi is considered a "rock journeyman" with a long list of collaborations with established acts such as Angora, Union and ESP (both with former Kiss lead guitarist Bruce Kulick), Ratt (as a guitarist), Twenty 4 Seven (with his then Ratt bandmate Bobby Blotzer), Zen Lunatic, Brides of Destruction, and Angel City Outlaws (with his then Ratt bandmates Robbie Crane and Bobby Blotzer, and former Ratt guitarist Keri Kelli, who he replaced in Ratt). He is the lead singer for supergroup the Dead Daisies. His autobiography titled Horseshoes & Hand Grenades was released in 2022 and he is finalizing a solo album for release.

== Early years ==
Corabi was born on April 26, 1959 in Philadelphia, Pennsylvania.

== Career ==
=== Mötley Crüe ===
After Mötley Crüe parted ways with lead singer Vince Neil in February 1992, Corabi was hired as his replacement. Bassist Nikki Sixx and drummer Tommy Lee stated that Corabi was capable of singing anything and everything and that was the reason they chose him. Corabi recorded the Mötley Crüe album in 1994 and the EP Quaternary. Though the music was heavier and more elaborate than the rest of the Mötley Crüe catalog, it did not sell as well as previous releases from the band. Before a concert in Tucson, Arizona which had a 15,000 seat capacity, only 4,000 tickets were sold, Nikki Sixx decided to call into a Tucson area radio station and offer any fan who showed up free tickets. When only two people took Sixx up on his offer, Sixx stated he knew this version of the band was finished. During the early stages of the writing of a new album which would become Generation Swine, Mötley Crüe's record label refused to provide funds to record the album unless Vince Neil was let back in the band. Rather than hiring another label, Mötley Crüe acceded to the demand and by 1997, Corabi departed the band and Neil returned. Many of the songs from the early writing session were used on the album and Corabi is credited on the liner notes for co-writing some of the songs.

Corabi and the rest of Mötley Crüe made personal appearances at London's Hard Rock Cafe at a private party in February 1994 promoting their Mötley Crüe album. The evening was also attended by many Mötley Crüe competition winners who were invited into the VIP area to chat to Corabi, as well as the other 3 band members. Early in 2008, Corabi attended the Motley Cruise, a 4-day cruise in the Caribbean (Miami, Key West and Cozumel, Mexico) including performers such as Vince Neil, Skid Row, Ratt, Slaughter, Endeverafter and Lynam. On this cruise, Corabi joined Vince Neil on stage to perform "Highway to Hell" by AC/DC. This performance was a unique event as fans witnessed the two Mötley Crüe vocalists share the same microphone.

Corabi spoke about his time with the band and his thoughts on the first record with Mötley Crüe. Corabi said: "my record was the first record that they had done that didn't go platinum, didn't make some sort of crazy noise, and everybody panicked".

In July 2015, Corabi and his band performed at a bar and played all of the songs off of the Mötley Crüe album. Weeks after the performance, Corabi stated "The album would have made it if this was under a different band name". He was portrayed by Anthony Vincent Valbiro in the 2019 Mötley Crüe biopic The Dirt.

John's relations with Mötley Crüe after his firing from the band has remained complicated, though Corabi and original guitarist Mick Mars has worked on some studio projects. When asked about his portrayal in the biopic The Dirt on an interview in September 2021, Corabi said: "After my incredibly STUPID portrayal in The Dirt Movie and the ludicrous shitty statements of one of the band members in regards to my contributions and lack of writing talents, yours truly is not even remotely interested in doing that again", in reference to a rumor on him rejoining the Crüe.

=== Other projects ===
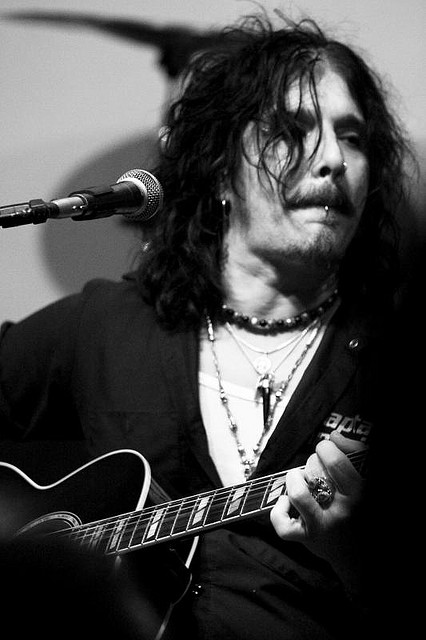
Corabi in 2010

In 1997, Corabi formed the band Union with Bruce Kulick (recently released from Kiss), Brent Fitz, and Jamie Hunting. John and Bruce wrote what would become the first Union album (self titled) and proceeded with a nationwide acoustic tour, to promote the album, featuring just Corabi and Kulick (both on guitar). Soon the full band went on a world tour headlining small venues in support of the Union album. The second album "Live in the Galaxy" was a live recording with two acoustic tracks recorded in a mobile studio. The third and final Union album, The Blue Room, was a more polished sound than the first studio CD. Union never officially called it quits (playing live shows every so often with guest drummers and bass players), but with Kulick playing along with Grand Funk Railroad, Corabi playing with many bands, most notably Ratt, and both members being tied up in solo projects, Union will probably never return to write new studio material.

Corabi played guitar and bass in the Eric Singer Project. ESP also featured guitarist Bruce Kulick, bassist Karl Cochran, and drummer Eric Singer. Ace Frehley makes a special appearance on the Hendrix cover Foxy Lady. He was also a member of Twenty 4 Seven, a collaboration with Corabi, drummer Bobby Blotzer (Ratt, Contraband), and guitarist Rob Marcello (Ironhorse, Obsession, Danger Danger) recorded 10 hard rock tracks entitled Destination Everywhere (US, 2002).

In early 2004, Corabi joined Jerry Cantrell's covers band Cardboard Vampyres. Also in the band were The Cult guitarist Billy Duffy, The Cult bassist Chris Wyse and drummer Josh Howser. The band played at various venues in the United States between 2004 and 2005. They predominately played along the West Coast. No albums were released by the band.

Corabi was featured as second guitarist on Brides of Destruction's 2004 album Here Comes The Brides. He had multiple reasons for leaving the band. One was that he was told it would be an effort much like the "Mötley Crüe" album. Secondly, he did not get along very well with Tracii Guns. He also said in an interview that "when Nikki told me about the band, I was really into the idea of writing another CD with the heavy sound of the Mötley Crüe album, but as we got more into recording, we had our drummer singing what was supposed to be the best song on the CD, when Nikki and Tracii were saying that our singer was the hot new thing, it just did not make sense to me."

In August 2008, Corabi parted ways with Ratt in order to pursue his solo career.

== Personal life ==
Corabi has one child, a son named Ian who is also a musician. Through his son, Corabi has twin granddaughters.

== Discography ==
Angora

- Six song demo tape
- Kings of Sunset Strip Vol. 1 CD (2004) RLS Records Compilation *Features 3 Angora songs

The Scream

- Let It Scream (1991)

Mötley Crüe

- Mötley Crüe (1994)
- Quaternary EP (1994)
- Generation Swine (1997) rhythm guitar, writer, uncredited vocals

Eric Singer Project

- Lost and Spaced (1998)
- Live in Japan (2007)
- ESP Live at the Marquee (2007 DVD)

Union

- Union (1998)
- Live in the Galaxy (1999)
- The Blue Room (2000)
- Do Your Own Thing Live (2005) concert video

Twenty 4 Seven

- Destination Everywhere (2002)

Brides of Destruction

- Here Comes the Brides (2004) Rhythm guitar and writer

Voodooland

- Advanced Ep (2003)
- Give Me Air (2004)

Liberty N' Justice

- Doubting Thomas (2007)

Ratt

- Infestation (2010) writer

John Corabi

- Unplugged (2012)
- Live 94 (One Night In Nashville) (2018)
- Cosi Bella (So Beautiful) - Single (2021)
- Your Own Worst Enemy - Single (2022)
- New Day (2026)

The Dead Daisies

- Revolución (2015)
- Make Some Noise (2016)
- Live & Louder - Live (2017)
- Burn It Down (2018)
- Locked and Loaded: The Covers Album - Live (2019)
- Light 'Em Up (2024)
- Lookin’ for Trouble (2025)
