= Ash Hudson =

American fashion designer and artist (born 1972)

- Born: Albion Hudson; 1972 (age 53–54); Los Angeles, California, U.S.
- Occupations: Designer; entrepreneur; photographer
- Known for: Founder of Conart
- Parents: Anthony Hudson (father); Ola Hudson (mother)
- Relatives: Saul "Slash" Hudson (brother)

Albion "Ash" Hudson (born 1972) is an American designer and artist recognized as a pioneer in streetwear fashion. He founded Conart (stylized in all caps), a brand credited with originating the integration of graffiti art into apparel in the early 1990s during the golden age of hip hop, significantly influencing hip-hop and streetwear culture. Writer Matt Kaufman has referred to him as "the godfather of streetwear fashion" in The Japan Times.

== Biography ==
Albion "Ash" Hudson was born in 1972 in Los Angeles, California. His father, Anthony Hudson, is an English artist known for creating album covers for musicians such as Neil Young and Joni Mitchell. His mother, Ola Hudson (died 2009), was an African-American fashion designer who created outfits for artists including John Lennon and The Pointer Sisters. His older brother is Saul Hudson, known as Slash, of Guns N' Roses. In 2013, Hudson moved to Japan, where he has worked to revive Conart through collaborations with brands like X-Large and a collection in South Korea.

== Career ==
=== Conart ===
In 1989, at age 16, Ash Hudson began selling graffiti-designed T-shirts in Los Angeles outside schools and at sidewalk booths. After getting the idea to reproduce designs rather than sell only original art he founded Conart, a brand named for "Convict" and "Art."

Conart is considered one of first brands to use graffiti artists as designers and is noted as “the original maker of the graffiti street-style T-shirt". Conart featured artists like Mear One and Chaz Bojórquez not only as design talent for the clothing, but also to support guerrilla marketing. In a 2008 interview Ash explained “the t-shirt and the city walls was like a blank canvas and I was featuring [Conart] with all the hype artists—PJay, Express, Mear— under that umbrella. They could bust-out a Conart mural and it was more in your face than a regular billboard and other corporate advertising like that”.

Conart grew to become a foundational brand, recognized by fashion historians as a precursor to brands like Supreme. Streetwear historian Gary Warnett noted that "Conart and Third Rail cemented LA's position as the birthplace of street wear".

Conart gained popularity in the hip-hop scene, with artists like Cypress Hill, Snoop Dogg, and N.W.A. wearing its apparel, and was covered in magazines such as Rap Pages and The Source. KRS-One also gave a shout out to the brand in the lyrics of 'Out for Fame' his ode to graffiti as an art form. The brand defined the style of 1990s subcultures, including skaters and taggers, and was celebrated at a 2014 retrospective event in Los Angeles.

=== Other creative work ===
Ash has also worked as a designer of album cover art and tour merchandise. He designed the cover for Slash's debut album, It's Five O'Clock Somewhere with Slash's Snakepit. Through Conart, he also produced items for artists such as A Tribe Called Quest, The Pharcyde and AC/DC. His photography has been exhibited at events like the DTLA Art Walk in 2014.

== Social media controversy ==
In 2015, Hudson's social media comments about Guns N' Roses front man Axl Rose in relation to a possible reunion tour were widely covered in the press and sparked some controversy, for which he issued a public apology. This did not seem to impact his relationship with the band, as he was seen later that year attending their concert in LA, and having his photo taken with Melissa Reese backstage.
