= L.A. Record =

American music magazine

- Categories: Music
- Frequency: Quarterly
- Publisher: YBX Media Inc
- Total circulation: 40,000 (2010)
- Founder: Sean Carlson, Dan Monick, Charlie Rose, Chris Ziegler
- Founded: 2005
- First issue: August 2005
- Country: United States
- Language: English
- Website: larecord.com

L.A. Record is an independent music magazine originally published weekly as a broadsheet poster. The poster usually depicts a local Los Angeles musicians and according to the magazine editors is meant to recreate an iconic album cover. In March 2008, it began publishing as a monthly magazine with a poster inside. The magazine is available to the public free of charge at local community spots in Southern California.

== History ==
The magazine was founded in 2005 by publisher Charlie Rose (not the TV personality), DJ and writer Chris Ziegler, Fuck Yeah Fest promoter Sean Carlson (involved from 2005 to 2007) and photographer Dan Monick. Their first issue featuring the Rolling Blackouts was set up as a parody of the New York Dolls' self-titled album cover. The cover and concept was chosen because the Rolling Blackouts were playing with the New York Dolls at the 2005 Sunset Junction Street Fair. The tradition of recreating album covers was developed by other bands who also wanted to recreate their favorite record cover. While there is no official rule, it has appeared in every issue. Now the publication is known for interviewing many local LA bands before they become popular in the mainstream including the Cold War Kids, Spindrift, Health, Flying Lotus, Moonrats, and Blank Blue. In January 2009, the Los Angeles Times recommended the L.A. Record as a resource to readers who would like to "separate the wheat from the chaff in the world of striving L.A. musicians" and lauded it for its "photography, promiscuous taste from avant-noise to vintage soul, eager but not worshipful writing and rad pull-out posters of RZA."

It concluded its first volume, a 29-issue run which began in August 2005 with the Rolling Blackouts, in March 2006 with Melvins collaborator and solo artist David Scott Stone. The second volume of 46 issues, also a weekly broadsheet, began in February 2007 with Big Business and concluded in December 2007 with AntiMC, leaving 75 total poster issues.

For the third volume, which began in March 2008 with Pocahaunted on the cover and BARR on the poster, L.A. Record began publishing monthly as a sixteen-page newsprint magazine with a poster as the centerfold. The website was also redesigned to make room for more content in February 2008.

Other visual contributors include photographer Chrissy Piper who shot several covers for Volume 1 and Erik Brunetti (owner and founder of FUCT), Ashkahn who did design work on several covers.

In August 2008 the magazine printed what may have been Isaac Hayes' last known interview.

== Magazine ==
The magazine has come in three types of format. It was first a broadsheet format containing an interview with a musician from Los Angeles, also featured on the cover. There is also an interview with a visiting band on tour, and other reviews or previews of local music, art, film, comedy and entertainment events.

The next format type was a monthly magazine which includes several interviews with local and touring bands as well as album reviews, original artwork, illustrated comic reviews of shows and records and expanded interviews. Also each issue includes a 22 × 32 inch poster featuring a local Los Angeles artist recreating an album cover of their choice. In May 2010, editorial staff announced that the magazine will be turning into a quarterly, which will feature local bands in addition to touring artists.

The first quarterly came out on July 31, 2010, and featured Flying Lotus on the cover. Ariel Pink's Haunted Graffiti was pictured in a center gatefold.

The magazine is also known to release vinyl 45 singles. The first one by L.A. Record writer and musician Devon Williams was released in summer 2007 to high acclaim. As a small but growing magazine it is becoming accepted and read among other industry magazines

== Website ==
The website features live reviews and album reviews that are updated multiple times a week. While some of these reviews are reprints of items published in the newspaper, many of them are unique to the website. The site also hosts videos and mp3s of local artists.
