= Ain't Life Grand (Slash's Snakepit album) =

Studio album by Slash's Snakepit
- Released: October 10, 2000
- Recorded: 1999
- Studio: Ocean Way, Hollywood; Snakepit Studios, Los Angeles
- Genre: Hard rock, blues rock
- Length: 58:38
- Label: Koch International
- Producer: Jack Douglas

Slash's Snakepit chronology
It's Five O'Clock Somewhere (1995)	Ain't Life Grand (2000)

Singles from Ain't Life Grand
- 1. "Been There Lately" Released: October 2000; 2. "Mean Bone" Released: February 2001

Professional ratings
Review scores
Source	Rating
Allmusic	3/5 stars
Rolling Stone	2.5/5 stars

Ain't Life Grand is the second and final studio album by American hard rock band Slash's Snakepit, released on October 10, 2000. The songs "Been There Lately" and "Mean Bone" were released as singles, and along with "Shine", had promo videos created for them.

== Track listing ==
All songs written by Slash's Snakepit; additional writers noted.

No.	Title	Length
1.	"Been There Lately"	4:28
2.	"Just Like Anything"	4:23
3.	"Shine"	5:21
4.	"Mean Bone"	4:40
5.	"Back to the Moment"	5:33
6.	"Life's Sweet Drug"	3:53
7.	"Serial Killer"	6:19
8.	"The Truth"	5:17
9.	"Landslide"	5:30
10.	"Ain't Life Grand"	4:54
11.	"Speed Parade"	3:52
12.	"The Alien"	4:27

Japanese edition
No.	Title	Length
13.	"Rusted Heroes"	4:51
14.	"Something About Your Love"	2:53

Notes

- Tracks 1, 3, 6, 10, 11, 13, and 14 written by Slash, Johnny Griparic, Rod Jackson, Matt Laug, and Ryan Roxie.
- Tracks 2, 4, 7–9, and 12 written by Slash, Griparic, Jackson, Laug, Roxie, and Jack Douglas.
- Track 5 written by Slash, Griparic, Jackson, Laug, Roxie, and Jeff Paris.

== Personnel ==
Slash's Snakepit

- Slash – lead and rhythm guitars, six-string bass, slide guitar
- Rod Jackson – lead vocals
- Ryan Roxie – rhythm guitar, backing vocals, lead guitar on "Rusted Heroes"
- Johnny Griparic – bass
- Matt Laug – drums

Additional musicians

- Teddy Andreadis – keyboards, backing vocals
- Collin Douglas – percussion
- Jimmy "Z" Zavala – saxophone, harmonica
- Lee Thornburg – trumpet
- Jeff Paris – backing vocals
- Karen Lawrence – backing vocals
- Kelly Hansen – backing vocals
- Kim Nail – backing vocals
- Raya Beam – vocals on "Mean Bone"

Production

- Jack Douglas – production, sitar, backing vocals
- Jay Messina – mixing
- Jim Mitchell – additional production, engineering
- Ales Olssen – engineering assistance
- John Tyree – engineering assistance
- Maurizio "Maui" Tiella – engineering assistance
- George Marino – mastering
- Greg Calbi – mastering

== Miscellaneous ==
- The album cover artwork has been released by ConArt, a graphic company owned by Slash's brother.
- The cassette promo version KOC-PRO-1062 entitled Snippet's From: Slash's Snakepit Ain't Life Grand contains 3 unreleased tracks that contain a "personal message from Slash".
- There is an early version of Ain't Life Grand released in very limited quantity by Interscope before Slash left the company in 2000 that was meant for the company's staff only. Two unreleased songs are on it: "Bleed" and "What Kind Of Life". Also included is the rare song "Something About Your Love". This versions tracklist is as follows:

No.	Title	Length
1.	"Been There Lately"
2.	"Anything (Just Like Anything)"
3.	"Shine"
4.	"One Mean Bone (Mean Bone)"
5.	"Break You (Back to the Moment)"
6.	"The Truth"
7.	"Landslide"
8.	"Ain't Life Grand"
9.	"Speed Parade"
10.	"Serial Killer"
11.	"Something About Your Love"
12.	"The Alien"
13.	"Bleed"
14.	"What Kind of Life?"

== Charts ==
Chart performance for Ain't Life Grand
Chart (2000)	Peak position
Australian Albums (ARIA)	56
German Albums (Offizielle Top 100)	58
Swiss Albums (Schweizer Hitparade)	96
