= Ola Hudson =

American fashion designer and costumier (1946–2009)

- Hudson in the early 1970s
- Born: Ola J. Oliver; October 12, 1946; Los Angeles, California, U.S.
- Died: June 5, 2009 (aged 62); Santa Monica, California, U.S.
- Education: Lester Horton School of Modern Dance; Paris Institute of Dance; Le Loft; Max Rivers School
- Occupations: Fashion designer; costume designer
- Spouse: Anthony Hudson (divorced)
- Children: Saul; Ash

Ola J. Hudson (née Oliver; October 12, 1946 – June 5, 2009) was an American fashion and costume designer. She designed costumes for several famous musicians, including the Pointer Sisters, Diana Ross, Janet Jackson, David Bowie, John Lennon and Ringo Starr. She is the mother of Saul Hudson, known professionally as Slash, of Guns N' Roses. Her designs are in the permanent collection of the Metropolitan Museum of Art.

== Biography ==
Hudson was born Ola J. Oliver in Los Angeles, California, on October 12, 1946. As a young adult, she studied at the Lester Horton School of Modern Dance. She also studied with dancers Bella Lewitzsky and Linda Gold. She then went to study at the Institute of Dance in Paris, at Le Loft in Switzerland and the Max Rivers School in London.

In London, she met and married album cover designer Anthony Hudson. In 1965, she gave birth to Saul Hudson (Slash from Guns N' Roses) in her husband's native United Kingdom. In 1972, she gave birth to Albion "Ash", their second son. Her marriage to Anthony was troubled and she returned to Los Angeles around 1974, based in Hollywood as a clothes designer. She had left her family in England but they met back up with her in the US around a year later in 1975. However, she and Anthony continued to have periods of separation throughout their marriage and the two had divorced by the time she died.

In the mid-1970s, Hudson designed clothes for David Bowie. They became lovers for a time. "He was the first guy that came along after my mom and dad divorced," Slash recalled, "so I can't think I was all that interested or happy… Now that I'm older, I can take his music to heart… The guy's a genius. And I worked with him a couple of times."

Hudson, a heavy smoker, died from lung cancer on June 5, 2009 at Saint John's Health Center in Santa Monica, California.

== Career ==
Hudson's design company was named Ola Hudson Enterprises, Incorporated. She also created special collections for Arpeja, Henri Bendel, Right Bank Clothing and Neiman Marcus in Beverly Hills, Maxfield Blu of Los Angeles. Hudson's fashion design was somewhat minimal. She said, "It's getting right down to basics". She was also known for her retro design work, featuring details from the 1940s, that the Pointer Sisters wore. Her designs were featured at a 1974 show, Los Angeles Space-Age Designs: Past-Present-Future. She also designed clothing for dancer Linda Gold.

Hudson designed clothing for the film The Man Who Fell to Earth and for David Bowie's Station to Station (both 1976). She also created the black pants and waistcoat for Bowie's Thin White Duke look, also in 1976. Some of the items she designed for Bowie are part of the permanent collection at the Metropolitan Museum of Modern Art.
