= Tere Tereba =

American actress

- Born: Warren, Ohio, U.S.
- Occupations: Fashion designer; actress; writer
- Website: https://teretereba.com/

Tere Tereba (born 1948) is an American fashion designer, writer, and actress. She is one of the pioneers of women's contemporary clothing design and is known for her role as Ingrid Joyner in Andy Warhol's Bad (1977). She is also the author of Mickey Cohen: The Life and Crimes of L.A.'s Notorious Mobster (2012).

== Life and career ==
=== Early life ===
A native of Warren, Ohio, her family moved to Los Angeles, California when she was 13 years old. Tereba spent her teen years going to clubs on the Sunset Strip to see musicians like Jimi Hendrix, Michael Bloomfield and the Doors perform in the 1960s.

=== Career ===
Pamela Courson, girlfriend of the Doors frontman Jim Morrison, discovered Tere and recruited her to design for her La Cienega Boulevard boutique, Themis, in 1969. Tereba was in Paris with Morrison and Courson days before his death in 1971.

Tereba worked for companies including Arpeja and Jody in California and Mindy Malone in New York, designing junior outfits. In the mid-1970s, Tereba joined Young Reflections, then the most important junior fashion label in the country, as a designer. She increased their sales from four million to ten million at retail stores such as Bonwit Teller, Bloomingdale's, I. Magnin, and Neiman Marcus.

Her passion for rock music segued into film and she caught the attention of Andy Warhol, who invited her to visit the Factory when she came to New York. Warhol once described Tereba as "looking like Hedy Lamarr and acting like Lucille Ball." As an aspiring actress, she was cast in the black comedy, Andy Warhol's Bad (1977), directed by Warhol's partner Jed Johnson. She played the role of Ingrid Joyner, a mother of an autistic child, which was a ground-breaking subject for film at the time.

Tereba was photographed by famed Golden Age of Hollywood photographer George Hurrell for the January 1977 issue of Andy Warhol's Interview magazine. Tereba wrote for the magazine for years, interviewing prominent filmmakers Steven Spielberg and Martin Scorsese, feminist Shere Hite, and musician Paul Shaffer.

In 1977, Tereba returned to Los Angeles and signed a dress design contract with Malibu Media. In the 1980s, she designed for Jonathan Martin and the Marie Claire label before launching her own line in 1984.

Tere continued creating fashion trends—her designs garnered 24 covers of Women's Wear Daily—and setting trends in her personal life with her idiosyncratic apartment, designed by Anthony Machado, and photographed by Mary E. Nichols for the June 1983 issue of Architectural Digest.

In 1994, Tereba and artist John Boskovich collaborated to produce the jewelry line Boskovich Tereba.

She emerged from a hiatus to design cutting-edge fashions. Paris Hilton was soon seen wearing Tereba's latest designs for bebe stores.

No longer active in the fashion world, Tereba has written a biography of the notorious Hollywood mob boss Mickey Cohen that delves into the Los Angeles underworld, titled Mickey Cohen: The Life and Crimes of L.A.'s Notorious Mobster. The book was released on May 1, 2012.

== Personal life ==
Tereba was in a relationship with songwriter Jerry Leiber for 16 years until his death in 2011.

She was an early collector of the artist Jean-Michel Basquiat.

For over thirty years she lived in the Hancock Park neighborhood of Los Angeles. She now resides in Santa Fe, New Mexico.

== Filmography ==
- Andy Warhol's Bad (1977)

== Books ==
- Tereba, Tere. Mickey Cohen: The Life and Crimes of L.A.'s Notorious Mobster (ECW Press, May 1, 2012) ISBN 1770410007
