= FUCT (clothing) =

American clothing company

- Company type: Private
- Industry: Retail
- Founded: 1990; 36 years ago Los Angeles, California, U.S.
- Founders: Erik Brunetti, Natas Kaupas
- Headquarters: U.S.
- Key people: creative director: Erik Brunetti
- Products: Apparel
- Owner: Erik Brunetti
- Website: fuct.com

FUCT or Friends U Can't Trust is a clothing brand founded in Los Angeles in 1990 by American artist and designer Erik Brunetti and professional skateboarder Natas Kaupas. Brunetti has said he choose the name "FUCT" because it was a homophone of the expletive "fucked" and he wanted people to question its pronunciation. FUCT has been referred to as one of the pioneering brands of modern streetwear, often incorporating various elements and icons of pop culture alongside anti-government and anti-religious campaigns into their designs including the use of parodied logos.

Along with clothing manufactured for various markets, FUCT also produces a higher-end FUCT S.S.D.D. line of clothing exclusively for the Japanese market; S.S.D.D. being an acronym of "Same Shit Different Day".

== History ==
=== Origins ===
FUCT was first conceptualized in 1990 by Erik Brunetti and Natas Kaupas in Brunetti's one-bedroom Venice Beach apartment. In a 2019 interview with skateboarding publication Jenkem, Brunetti stated that the two "thought it would be clever to call the brand FUCT and present it [as] very corporate, so you had to question the pronunciation of the name based on the way it looked." FUCT's first logo was designed using software available on Brunetti's Macintosh Classic computer. In 1991, Kaupas and Brunetti filed as a business under the name "FUCT Designs". Shortly afterward, Kaupas parted ways with the company.

In 2002, Brunetti stepped away from the brand to focus on personal artistic endeavors before returning to the company in 2005.

In 2013, publishing house Rizzoli released "FUCT". The book was published as a retrospective of the brand's history published to coincide with its 20-year anniversary. The book, written by Brunetti, includes essays by Aaron Rose and Gary Warnett.

=== Advertising ===
Throughout the 1990s, the company rarely sold through the apparel trade shows popular at the time. Instead, FUCT chose to market through magazine editorials and full-page, printed advertisements in publications such as the skateboarding magazines Thrasher, Big Brother, and Strength. These advertisements were often self-effacing and controversial in nature, designed to play up FUCT's counter-cultural image. Many of these advertisements included Brunetti's personal phone number as the point of contact for wholesale purchases.

In 1996, Fuct launched its e-commerce website, fuct.com. Fuct used this platform to experiment with selling and marketing their product. The brand's website included a catalog, a newsletter, customer support, and specific mail-in instructions for purchasing garments directly.

=== Skate culture ===
FUCT has thorough roots in skateboarding culture. Brunetti and Kaupas met through their mutual affiliation with skateboarding company, World Industries.

In 1998, FUCT released its first and only skate video, Random Acts of Kindness. Shot in New York City and Los Angeles, the video followed the FUCT skate team in addition to numerous graffiti artists affiliated with the brand. The video was shot on VHS and has a 30-minute run-time.

== Work and collaborations ==
Throughout the 1990s FUCT partnered with photographers Larry Clark and Shawn Mortenson on multiple campaigns. The subjects of Mortenson's campaigns include Kate Moss, Snoop Dogg, The Notorious B.I.G., and Keith Richards.

In 1998, artist Kaws enlisted Brunetti to collaborate on an advertisement for design house Calvin Klein.

In collaboration with clothing brand, X-Large, Fuct opened the doors of its first brick-and-mortar location, X-FUCT, in 1993. Located in Los Angeles, CA, X-FUCT’s interior was modeled to resemble a deli; this design included the use of repurposed deli meat counters as displays for the merchandise. X-FUCT released limited collaborative runs throughout the store’s operation in addition to stocking the brands’ respective products. After X-FUCT closed, Brunetti resumed operation of FUCT at his Hollywood Hills home.

In 2008, FUCT launched its SSDD (Same Shit, Different Day) line of merchandise in Japan. The design language incorporated motifs inspired by the American counter-cultural movements of the 1960s and 70's.

In 2018, FUCT partnered with Los Angeles-based streetwear brand FTP to release a pair of collaborative capsules.

In 2019, FUCT partnered with Richardson Magazine to release a capsule collection. The release included previous FUCT designs co-branded with the Richardson logo.

== Cultural impact ==
FUCT is well known for appropriating pop-culture iconography into its own branding. Throughout its run, the brand has repurposed a wide range of iconography, often in a satirical manner. Brunetti's approach to satire established FUCT as a pillar of 90s counterculture, earning him a "reputation as one of the toughest streetwear designers in America".

FUCT is thought to be one of the first clothing companies to experiment with CMYK printing on apparel. In 1992, FUCT released its "Goodfellas" T-shirt. The T-shirt features a portrait of the film's main cast, re-appropriated to include the brand's logo. The "Goodfellas" design is thought to be the first piece of streetwear to reference film as part of its branding.

In 1999, The Face magazine named FUCT as one of the top forty iconic labels in fashion.

In 2011, Complex Magazine ranked FUCT as the 7th greatest streetwear brand "of all time". In his ranking of the brand, author Bobby Hundreds stated there was "a reason why a good chunk of the top contenders [on the list had] stolen fragments of their identity from Brunetti's creations."

Larry Clark's personal collection of FUCT apparel added to the foundation of his exhibition, Printed Matter, installed at the Museum of Contemporary Art, Los Angeles in 2013. The apparel exhibited by Clark was then purchased by Cornell University Library’s Rare Book and Manuscript department due to its cultural significance and affiliation with Clark's work.

FUCT is known for its influence on other streetwear brands and fashion designers. The iconography used in A Bathing Ape's merchandise can be directly linked to graphics used in FUCT's Planet of the Apes designs.

In its infancy, Shepard Fairey's streetwear brand Obey appropriated heavily from FUCT's design language, namely the latter's logo and graffiti-inspired imagery.

Notable people who have worn FUCT clothing include Leonardo DiCaprio in the 2000 film, The Beach, Rihanna, Hailey Baldwin, and Billie Eilish.

Musician Trent Reznor has been seen wearing FUCT apparel during studio recording sessions.

In Nirvana's most famous band photoshoot, Dave Grohl can be seen wearing a FUCT baseball cap.

Rage Against the Machine front-man Zach de la Rocha can be seen wearing FUCT's Ford Motors logo in the video for Bullet in the Head.

== Supreme Court case ==
In 2011, Brunetti applied for a federal trademark for the brand name due to a number of knock-offs online. The U.S. Patent and Trademark Office denied the trademark citing the power to "scandalous" trademark applications through the Lanham Act. A federal appeals court in Washington ruled in his favor in 2017, but was appealed by the Trump administration, reaching the U.S. Supreme Court.

On June 24, 2019, in the case Iancu v. Brunetti, the Supreme Court ruled 6-3 that the Patent and Trademark Office cannot deny trademark registration due to a name being "immoral" or "scandalous", citing that the provision infringes the First Amendment.
