= Slash's Snakepit =

American rock supergroup

- From left to right: Mike Inez, Eric Dover, Slash, Gilby Clarke and Matt Sorum

Background information
- Origin: Los Angeles, California, U.S.
- Genres: Hard rock; blues rock
- Years active: 1994–1995; 1998–2002
- Labels: Geffen; Koch
- Spinoff of: Guns N' Roses; Slash's Blues Ball; Velvet Revolver; Alice Cooper; Alice in Chains; Jellyfish; Pride & Glory; The Cult
- Past members: Slash; Gilby Clarke; Eric Dover; Mike Inez; Matt Sorum; James LoMenzo; Brian Tichy; Johnny Griparic; Rod Jackson; Matt Laug; Ryan Roxie; Keri Kelli

Slash's Snakepit was an American rock supergroup from Los Angeles, California, formed by Guns N' Roses guitarist Slash in 1994. Though often described as a solo or side project, Slash stated that Snakepit was a band with equal contributions by all members. The first lineup of the band consisted of: Slash, two of his Guns N' Roses bandmates—drummer Matt Sorum and guitarist Gilby Clarke—as well as Alice in Chains bassist Mike Inez and former Jellyfish guitarist Eric Dover on lead vocals.

Their debut album, It's Five O'Clock Somewhere, was released in 1995. For the supporting tour, Slash enlisted James LoMenzo and Brian Tichy, of Pride & Glory, in place of Inez and Sorum, who had other commitments. They played shows in the US, Europe, Japan and Australia before Geffen Records pulled their financial support for the tour, with Slash returning to Guns N' Roses and Slash's Snakepit disbanding.

Following his departure from Guns N' Roses in 1996, Slash formed the cover band Slash's Blues Ball. After a tour in 1997, Slash approached Blues Ball bassist Johnny Griparic about forming a new lineup of Slash's Snakepit. The new lineup consisted of Slash, Griparic, singer Rod Jackson, guitarist Ryan Roxie, and drummer Matt Laug (Roxie and Laug were both former members of Alice Cooper's solo band). They recorded and released their second album, entitled Ain't Life Grand, in 2000, which was preceded by a tour supporting AC/DC and followed by their own headlining tour. For the tour, Keri Kelli joined the group in place of Ryan Roxie, who departed following the completion of the album. However, after the final show, Slash disbanded Snakepit due to a lack of commitment from his band members. Shortly after, Slash formed Velvet Revolver in 2002, along with drummer Matt Sorum, and bassist Duff McKagan, both fellow former-Guns N' Roses members.

== History ==
=== Formation (1993–1994) ===
Following the two and a half year world tour in support of the albums Use Your Illusion I and Use Your Illusion II, Guns N' Roses guitarist Slash returned to Los Angeles. He soon sold his home, the Walnut House, and moved to Mulholland Drive. He built a small home studio, nicknamed The Snakepit, over his garage and began working on demos for songs he had written during the tour. Slash worked on the demos with Guns N' Roses bandmate and drummer Matt Sorum. They were later joined by fellow Guns N' Roses bandmate Gilby Clarke and Alice in Chains bassist Mike Inez, jamming and recording most nights. Slash played the demos for Axl Rose, who rejected the material, though he would later want to use them for the next Guns N' Roses album. They had recorded twelve songs by 1994, the same year that Guns N' Roses went on hiatus.

Slash decided to record the Snakepit demos with Sorum, Clarke and Inez, later adding former Jellyfish live guitarist Eric Dover as lead vocalist. The decision to record with Dover led to a disagreement between Slash and Sorum, due to Slash not seeking Sorum's approval before hiring Dover.

=== It's Five O'Clock Somewhere and breakup (1994–1996) ===
Beggars & Hangers-On
A sample of "Beggars & Hangers-On" from It's Five O'Clock Somewhere. The band's first single from It's Five O'Clock Somewhere was co-written by Slash's Guns N' Roses band mate Duff McKagan.

Slash and Dover wrote the lyrics to all twelve songs with Slash using the songwriting to vent his frustrations at Guns N' Roses singer Axl Rose. Clarke contributed the song "Monkey Chow" to the album while "Jizz da Pit" is an instrumental by Slash and Inez. They recorded the album at Conway Recording Studios and The Record Plant with Mike Clink and Slash co-producing and Steven Thompson and Michael Barbiero mixing, all of whom had worked with Guns N' Roses on their debut album Appetite for Destruction. The album featured contributions by Duff McKagan (who co-wrote "Beggars & Hangers-On"), Dizzy Reed on keyboards, Teddy Andreadis on harmonica, and Paulinho da Costa on percussion. Slash's brother, Ash Hudson, designed the album's cover.

The resulting album, titled It's Five O'Clock Somewhere, was released in February 1995 through Geffen Records. The album's title was taken from a phrase Slash overheard at an airport. At the insistence of the record label, the album was released under the name Slash's Snakepit, instead of The Snakepit, despite Slash not wanting his name used. Upon release, the album charted at number 70 on the Billboard 200 and number 15 on the UK Albums Chart. "Beggars & Hangers-On" was released as the first, and only, single from the album; while a music video was also shot for "Good to Be Alive", directed by August Jakobsson.

"We were in the midst of booking another leg when I was informed by Geffen that they'd sold a million copies of It's Five O'Clock Somewhere and had turned a profit so they saw no reason for me to continue our tour. I was to return to L.A. because Axl was ready to begin working on the next Guns N' Roses record. They'd thought it through: in case I objected, they made it clear that the financial tour support for Snakepit was over."

— Slash on Geffen pulling tour support.

Critically, the album received mainly positive reviews. Metal Hammer stated that "the sleazy, downtrodden blues hard rock [...] breaks new ground." AllMusic reviewer Stephen Thomas Erlewine called Slash's contributions "quite amazing", though criticized the song-writing, stating "it's too bad that nobody in the band bothered to write any songs." Devon Jackson of Entertainment Weekly described the album as "relaxed headbanging and Southern-tinged blues-rock" while Classic Rock reviewer Malcolm Dome stated "musically, it's a loose-limbed record that has a lot of heavy guitar-led punk-style pop-rock." Slash's Snakepit toured in support of the album, with bassist James LoMenzo and drummer Brian Tichy, of Pride & Glory, replacing Inez and Sorum, who had opted out of touring, with Sorum returning to Guns N' Roses. They toured the US, Europe, Japan and Australia, including with Metallica, with Slash stating that "for the first time in years, touring was easy, [his] band mates were loads of fun and low on drama, and every gig was about playing rock and roll." While booking another leg of the tour, Slash was informed by Geffen that Axl Rose was ready to begin work on the new Guns N' Roses album and that he was to return to Los Angeles. Geffen pulled financial support for the band's tour with Slash's Snakepit disbanding soon after.

=== Slash's Blues Ball and reformation (1996–1999) ===
Slash departed Guns N' Roses in 1996, due to musical differences between himself and singer Axl Rose. Following his departure, Slash toured Japan for two weeks with Chic, and worked on the soundtrack to the film Curdled. He later began touring in a blues cover band that eventually became Slash's Blues Ball. Aside from Slash, the band consisted of Teddy Andreadis, guitarist Bobby Schneck, bassist Johnny Griparic, saxophonist Dave McClarem and drummer Alvino Bennett. The band toured on and off until 1998, which included a headline slot at a jazz festival in Budapest. They covered various artists and bands such as B.B. King, Steppenwolf, Otis Redding, as well as Guns N' Roses and early Slash's Snakepit material.

Following a tour in 1997, Slash approached Griparic about forming a new lineup of Slash's Snakepit They began looking for a singer, receiving over 300 audition tapes from mostly unknown singers. Jon Stevens of Noiseworks, who had been recording with Slash, was seen as a potential singer in early 1998. However, he returned to Australia to continue his solo career. They eventually chose Rod Jackson (earlier of Virginia-based band Ragdoll) after Griparic played a tape of him for Slash. Completing the lineup were guitarist Ryan Roxie, formerly of Alice Cooper, and drummer Matt Laug, also from Alice Cooper and the band Venice. They began rehearsing at Mates Studio before rehearsing and recording in Slash's new home studio in Beverly Hills.

=== Ain't Life Grand and second breakup (1999–2002) ===
Mean Bone
A sample of "Mean Bone" from Ain't Life Grand. The band's first single from Ain't Life Grand was criticized due to the female rap at the beginning of the song.

The band began recording material with producer Jack Douglas at Slash's home studio as well as Ocean Way Recording. The recording featured contributions by Teddy Andreadis, Jimmy Zavala and Lee Thornburg, amongst others. Initially, the label was positive about the album, setting a release date for February 22, 2000. However, when Slash was informed by Geffen, who had folded into Interscope Records, that the album was not the type of music the label produced, he bought the album back and signed a deal with Koch Records. Following the completion of the album, Roxie departed the band with former Big Bang Babies, Warrant and Ratt guitarist Keri Kelli joining in his place.

Ain't Life Grand was released on October 20, 2000 through Koch with "Mean Bone" released as the first single. The album did not sell as well as its predecessor, and critical reception to it was mixed. Entertainment Weekly reviewer Tony Scherman stated that "Slash's playing is as flashily incendiary as ever, but the songs and arrangements recycle hard-rock cliches worthier of Ratt than of a bona fide guitar god". Rob Sheffield of Rolling Stone noted that "great guitarists need great bands, and the Snakepit dudes are barely functional backup peons". Steve Huey of Allmusic noted that "the new Snakepit does kick up a lot of noise as the album rushes by, and the strong chemistry between the members is immediately obvious". However, he stated that songwriting was the main problem, and that "it never rises above the level of solid, and too many tracks are by-the-numbers hard rock at best (and pedestrian at worst)". The band were dropped by Koch two months following the album's release.

Prior to the album's release, Slash's Snakepit supported AC/DC on their Stiff Upper Lip tour from August to September, followed by their own headlining tour of theaters. They played only the first two shows on the winter leg of AC/DC's tour. After falling ill and checking into a hospital in Pittsburgh, Slash was ordered by his doctor to stay at home to recuperate, reportedly from pneumonia. Due to this, Slash's Snakepit pulled out of supporting AC/DC in early 2001. Slash later revealed in his self-titled biography that he had actually suffered cardiac myopathy caused by years of alcohol and drug abuse, with his heart swelling to the point of rupture. After being fitted with a defibrillator and undergoing physical therapy, Slash returned to the group to continue touring. They later rescheduled their US tour, performing shows from June 16 – July 18, co-headlining three shows with Billy Idol. Following the tour, Slash hid in the tour bus, waiting for the rest of the band to go home. He then announced the disbanding of Slash's Snakepit in an announcement made in early 2002. He cited, in particular, Jackson's poor work ethic and unreliability.

=== Post–breakup activities ===
Following the breakup of Slash's Snakepit, Slash announced he was to begin working on a solo album. Instead he later worked with The Black Crowes drummer Steve Gorman and an unnamed bassist on a new project. Together with his former Guns N' Roses bandmates Duff McKagan and Matt Sorum, they formed The Project, that eventually became the hard rock supergroup Velvet Revolver following the addition of former Wasted Youth guitarist Dave Kushner, and then-former Stone Temple Pilots singer Scott Weiland. They released their debut album Contraband, in 2004, followed by Libertad in 2007, before they parted ways with Weiland and went on hiatus in 2008. With Velvet Revolver on hiatus, Slash began work on his debut solo album. Slash was released on March 31, 2010, and featured a number of guests such as Andrew Stockdale of Wolfmother, M. Shadows of Avenged Sevenfold, Kid Rock, Ozzy Osbourne, Myles Kennedy of Alter Bridge, and Fergie. His band for the tour in support of the album consisted of Kennedy, bassist Todd Kerns, and drummer Brent Fitz. It also included guitarist Bobby Schneck, formerly of Slash's Blues Ball.

== Musical style ==
Slash's Snakepit's music was often described as hard rock and blues rock with elements of southern rock. The band were also often described as Slash's solo or side project though Slash maintained that they were a band, stating "everybody wrote, everybody had equal input even though I had my name on it." Rolling Stone reviewer J.D. Considine noted the differences between Guns N' Roses and Slash's Snakepit on their first album, stating that "Guns [N]' Roses typically treat the melody as the most important part of the song, most of what slithers out of the Snakepit emphasizes the playing." He noted that singer Eric Dover "conveys the raw-throated intensity of a hard-rock frontman" and "he avoids the genre's most obvious excesses." The riff to "Good to Be Alive" drew a comparison to Chuck Berry while the musicianship on the album was praised. Stephen Thomas Erlewine of Allmusic stated that "there's little argument that Slash is a great guitarist" who is "capable of making rock and blues clichés sound fresh". Reviewing Ain't Life Grand for Allmusic, Steve Huey described second singer Rod Jackson as "a combination of '80s pop-metal bluster and Faces-era Rod Stewart" with a "touch of Aerosmith", a description that he felt also fitted the band as a whole. He noted, though, that Slash's guitar playing was "tame" and stated that the main problem of the album was the songwriting, though it was "still a passable, workmanlike record that will definitely appeal to fans of grimy, old-school hard rock." Malcolm Dome of Classic Rock stated that "from the moment that "Been There Lately" opens, there's a vibe here that was missing before" and that Ain't Life Grand showed "purpose, direction and individuality."

== Personnel ==
Final line-up

- Slash – lead and rhythm guitar, slide guitar, backing vocals (1994–1995, 1998–2002)
- Rod Jackson – lead vocals (1998–2002)
- Johnny Griparic – bass, backing vocals (1998–2002)
- Matt Laug – drums, percussion, backing vocals (1998–2002)
- Keri Kelli – rhythm guitar, backing vocals (2000–2002)

Former members

- Gilby Clarke – rhythm guitar, slide guitar, backing vocals (1994–1995)
- Eric Dover – lead vocals, harmonica, rhythm guitar (1994–1995)
- Mike Inez – bass, backing vocals (1994–1995)
- Matt Sorum – drums, percussion, backing vocals (1994–1995)
- James LoMenzo – bass, backing vocals (1995)
- Brian Tichy – drums, backing vocals (1995)
- Ryan Roxie – rhythm guitar, backing vocals (1998–2000)

== Discography ==
=== Studio albums ===
List of studio albums, with selected details and chart positions
Title	Album details	Peak chart positions									
Title	Album details	US	AUS	AUT	CAN	GER	NED	NOR	SWE	SWI	UK
It's Five O'Clock Somewhere	Released: February 14, 1995; Label: Geffen; Formats: CD, LP, CS	70	26	15	19	19	19	27	11	15	15
Ain't Life Grand	Released: October 10, 2000; Label: Koch; Format: CD	—	56	—	—	58	—	—	—	96	146

=== Singles ===
List of singles, with selected chart positions
Title	Year	Peak chart positions		Album
Title	Year	US Main.	AUS	Album
"Beggars & Hangers-On"	1995	21	85	It's Five O'Clock Somewhere
"Good to Be Alive"	1995	—	—	It's Five O'Clock Somewhere
"Been There Lately"	2000	—	—	Ain't Life Grand
"Mean Bone"	2000	—	—	Ain't Life Grand
