= Slash's Blues Ball =

American blues rock band, 1996–1998

- Origin: Los Angeles, California, USA
- Genres: Blues rock, hard rock
- Years active: 1996–1998
- Past members: Slash; Teddy Andreadis; Alvino Bennet; Johnny Griparic; Dave McLarem; Bobby Schneck

Slash's Blues Ball was an American blues rock band that formed in Los Angeles, California in 1996. The band members comprised lead guitarist Slash, lead vocalist Teddy "Big Bag Zig Zag" Andreadis, bassist Johnny Griparic, drummer Alvino Bennet, rhythm guitarist Bobby Schneck and saxophonist Dave McLaurin.

They were formed by Slash after his departure from the group Guns N' Roses due to creative and personal disagreements. Andreadis had already worked with Slash in Guns N' Roses as an instrument technician and occasional live keyboardist or harmonica player. Slash's Blues Ball were a cover band, performing various hard rock, R&B and blues rock songs by the likes of Jimi Hendrix, B.B. King, Bob Dylan, and Fleetwood Mac.

The band was active for two years, and did not release any albums but various live recordings have circulated among fans. Andreadis and Griparic later collaborated with Slash on his 2024 album Orgy of the Damned and played in Slash's touring band for his S.E.R.P.E.N.T. Festival Tour.

== Band members ==
- Slash – lead guitar
- Teddy Andreadis – lead vocals, harmonica, keyboards
- Alvino Bennet – drums
- Johnny Griparic – bass
- Dave McLaurin – saxophone
- Bobby Schneck – rhythm guitar
