= Arpeja =

20th century women's clothing company

Arpeja-California, Inc. was a Los-Angeles based junior's and women's clothing company in the 1960s and 1970s owned by Jack Litt. Among their labels, their trademarked clothing brands were Young Innocent, Young Edwardian, Young Victorian, and later, Organically Grown, offering affordable, youth- and trend-oriented clothing. The flagship brands were influenced by 1960's British boutique fashion, including popular retro trends favoring Turn of the Century and 1930s silhouettes. Organically Grown, started in 1973, offered women's separates with modern styling, and was known for knits.

== History ==
Arpeja-California, Inc. was first incorporated in October 1961. The trademark for their first brand, Young Innocent, was registered by Arpeja Petite Juniors, Inc. in 1964 to make junior's dresses. Another junior's dress brand, Young Victorian, followed in 1965. Young Edwardian, perhaps the company's best known line, was registered as a women's dressmaker in 1969. In 1973, the company filed for the brand Organically Grown, which had an illustrated fruit tree as its logo, to make contemporary women's separates. A fifth trademark, Ms Arpeja, was registered in 1975 but never established. In addition to these, company advertising showed other labels, including Circuit West, Cafe Crowd, L.A. Station, Pipe Line, Tail Feathers, and Union Jack.

From 1972 on and while still in her twenties, Sue Wong, who started at the company as an intern, served as head designer of the Young Edwardian label. In 1977, the Young Edwardian brand brought in $50 million, all on sales of dresses priced at $50 or less. One style, an appliqued sun dress, brought in $2 million alone. Lynda Carter, star of the 1970s television show "Wonder Woman", served as a spokesperson, modelling for print ads in 1977 and 1978.

As a California business entity, Arpeja-California, Inc. was merged out by 1979.

In 1992, Organically Grown's trademarks were sold by Arpeja-California, Inc. to Marshalls of MA., Inc. In 1995, Marshalls was acquired by The TJX Companies, Inc. (TJ Maxx). In October 2007, Organically Grown Group, LLC, an entity including Larry Brandt, Arpeja’s former East Coast sales manager, acquired all rights from The TJX Companies, Inc. to start a new company, Organically Grown (Delaware company), focusing on organic lifestyle products.
