= Orgy of the Damned =

2024 studio album by Slash

Studio album by Slash
- Released: May 17, 2024
- Recorded: 2023
- Studio: East West / Snakepit (Los Angeles)
- Genre: Blues rock
- Length: 69:39
- Label: Gibson
- Producer: Mike Clink

Slash chronology
4 (2022)	Orgy of the Damned (2024)	Flying Blind (2027)

Singles from Orgy of the Damned
- 1. "Killing Floor" Released: March 8, 2024; 2. "Oh Well" Released: April 12, 2024

Orgy of the Damned is the sixth studio solo album (Note: Sixth if counting his work with Myles Kennedy and the Conspirators) by British-American musician Slash, released on May 17, 2024, through Gibson. The album is a collaborative blues cover project with a variety of musicians and singers, including Gary Clark Jr., Billy Gibbons, Chris Stapleton, Dorothy, Iggy Pop, Paul Rodgers, Demi Lovato, Brian Johnson, Chris Robinson, Tash Neal, and Beth Hart.

The album was preceded by the release of two singles; covers of the Howlin' Wolf song "Killing Floor" and the Fleetwood Mac song "Oh Well" were released on March 8 and April 12, 2024, respectively.

== Background and release ==
Slash's first blues works date back to 1996, when he parted ways with band Guns N' Roses and experimented with the music genre in concert tours with the group Slash's Blues Ball. Three decades later, in 2023, he reunited with two of his former bandmates, Johnny Griparic on bass guitar and Teddy Andreadis on keys, as well as Michael Jermone on drums, to record the instrumentals of the album with producer Mike Clink at East West Studios and Snakepit Studio in Los Angeles.

On March 8, 2024, Slash released a cover of the song "Killing Floor" by Howlin' Wolf, which features vocals by Brian Johnson and harmonica by Steven Tyler. The album, Orgy of the Damned, was announced the same day, which was available to pre-order. In an interview with Rolling Stone, the musician stated: "'Killing Floor' was a song that I've always wanted to do [...] Brian was the only guy I thought of for that song, just because I know Brian's voice, and I know what it sounds like when he sings in a lower register".

== Critical reception ==
Professional ratings
Review scores
Source	Rating
AllMusic	3.5/5 stars
Blues Rock Review	8/10
PopMatters	3/10
Riff Magazine	7/10
Spill	4/5 stars

In a positive review for Blues Rock Review, Meghan Roos dubbed the project as a whole a "fascinating listen", which is able "to explore different blues sounds and styles in accordance with how each of the chosen singers meshes with the material". The reviewer highlighted "Stormy Monday", "Born Under a Bad Sign", and "Living for the City" as standouts. Riff Magazine's Sam Richards wrote that although the songs on the album are "old warhorses that get minimal reworking, there's a reason they're standards". He added that Slash "recognizes this, and most of his guests keep things interesting around him".

== Commercial performance ==
Orgy of the Damned debuted at number 98 on the US Billboard 200, including atop the Blues Albums and number 26 on the Top Rock & Alternative Albums charts with 10,500 copies sold in its first week of release.

== Track listing ==
Orgy of the Damned track listing
No.	Title	Writer(s)	Length
1.	"The Pusher" (featuring Chris Robinson)	Hoyt Axton	7:07
2.	"Crossroads" (featuring Gary Clark Jr.)	Robert Johnson	5:34
3.	"Hoochie Coochie Man" (featuring Billy Gibbons)	Willie Dixon	6:43
4.	"Oh Well" (featuring Chris Stapleton)	Peter Green	4:33
5.	"Key to the Highway" (featuring Dorothy)	Charlie Segar	5:09
6.	"Awful Dream" (featuring Iggy Pop)	Lightnin' Hopkins; Clarence Lewis; C Morgan Robinson	5:32
7.	"Born Under a Bad Sign" (featuring Paul Rodgers)	William Bell; Booker T. Jones	5:00
8.	"Papa Was a Rolling Stone" (featuring Demi Lovato)	Norman Whitfield; Barrett Strong	7:52
9.	"Killing Floor" (featuring Brian Johnson, Steven Tyler)	Chester Burnett	4:18
10.	"Living for the City" (featuring Tash Neal)	Stevie Wonder	6:52
11.	"Stormy Monday" (featuring Beth Hart)	Aaron Walker	7:58
12.	"Metal Chestnut"	Slash	3:01
Total length:			69:39

== Personnel ==
Musicians

- Slash – guitars, guitar solos (all tracks); acoustic guitar, 12-string acoustic guitar (track 6), talk box (track 8), pedal steel guitar (track 12)
- Johnny Griparic – bass (tracks 1–5, 7–12)
- Teddy Andreadis – keyboards (tracks 1–5, 7–12)
- Michael Jerome – drums, percussion (tracks 1–5, 7–11)
- Tash Neal – rhythm guitar (tracks 1, 3–5, 7–12), guitar solo (3, 10), vocals (10)
- Chris Robinson – harmonica, vocals (track 1)
- Gary Clark Jr. – guitar, guitar solo, vocals (track 2)
- Billy Gibbons – guitar, vocals (track 3)
- Les Stroud – harmonica (track 3)
- Chris Stapleton – vocals (track 4)
- Dorothy – vocals (track 5)
- Iggy Pop – vocals (track 6)
- Paul Rodgers – vocals (track 7)
- Demi Lovato – vocals (track 8)
- Steven Tyler – harmonica (track 9)
- Brian Johnson – vocals (track 9)
- Jenna Bell – background vocals (track 10)
- Jessie Payo – background vocals (track 10)
- Beth Hart – vocals (track 11)
- Matt Chamberlain – drums (track 12)

Technical

- Mike Clink – production, recording
- Andrew Mendelson – mastering
- John Spiker – mixing, recording
- David Spreng – recording
- John Ewing – recording assistance
- Chad Shlosser – recording assistance (tracks 3, 7)
- Darrell Thorp – recording assistance (track 4)
- Oak Felder – recording assistance (track 8)
- Matt DeSear – recording assistance (track 9)

== Charts ==
Chart performance for Orgy of the Damned
Chart (2024)	Peak position
Australian Albums (ARIA)	14
Austrian Albums (Ö3 Austria)	2
Belgian Albums (Ultratop Flanders)	44
Belgian Albums (Ultratop Wallonia)	12
Dutch Albums (Album Top 100)	41
Finnish Albums (Suomen virallinen lista)	34
French Albums (SNEP)	12
German Albums (Offizielle Top 100)	2
Hungarian Physical Albums (MAHASZ)	21
Italian Albums (FIMI)	48
Japanese Albums (Oricon)	25
Japanese Digital Albums (Oricon)	21
Japanese Hot Albums (Billboard Japan)	30
New Zealand Albums (RMNZ)	29
Polish Albums (ZPAV)	79
Portuguese Albums (AFP)	58
Scottish Albums (Official Charts)	3
Swedish Albums (Sverigetopplistan)	25
Swiss Albums (Schweizer Hitparade)	2
UK Albums (Official Charts)	8
UK Independent Albums (Official Charts)	2
US Billboard 200	98
US Top Blues Albums (Billboard)	1
US Top Rock & Alternative Albums (Billboard)	26

== Notes ==
Lead Vocals on track 3, by Billy F. Gibbons and track 7 Lead Vocals, by Paul Rodgers, were both recorded at The Church Studios in Cathedral City, California, and engineered by Chad Shlosser.
