= Slash (musician) =

British musician (born 1965)

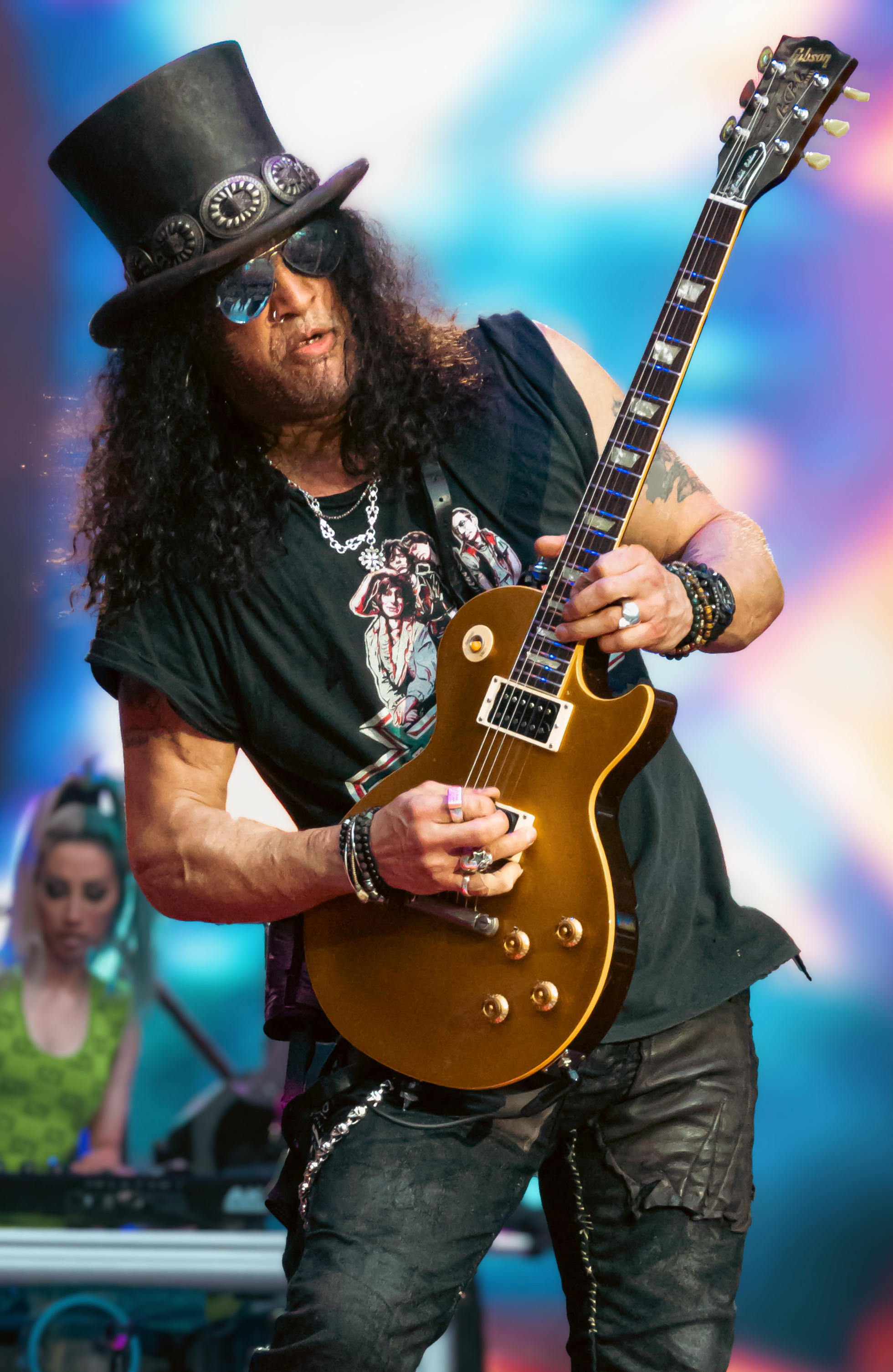
- Slash performing with Guns N' Roses in 2022
- Born: Saul Hudson; 23 July 1965 (age 61); Hampstead, London, England
- Citizenship: United Kingdom; United States
- Occupations: Musician, songwriter
- Years active: 1981–present
- Spouses: Renée Suran (m. 1992; div. 1997) Perla Ferrar (m. 2001; div. 2015)
- Children: 2
- Mother: Ola Hudson
- Relatives: Ash Hudson (brother)
- Musical career
- Origin: Los Angeles, California, U.S.
- Genres: Hard rock; heavy metal; blues rock; glam metal
- Instrument: Guitar
- Labels: Dik Hayd; Snakepit; Roadrunner; Gibson
- Member of: Guns N' Roses, Slash featuring Myles Kennedy and the Conspirators
- Formerly of: Road Crew; Hollywood Rose; Kings of Chaos; Slash's Blues Ball; Slash's Snakepit; Velvet Revolver
- Website: slashonline.com

Signature
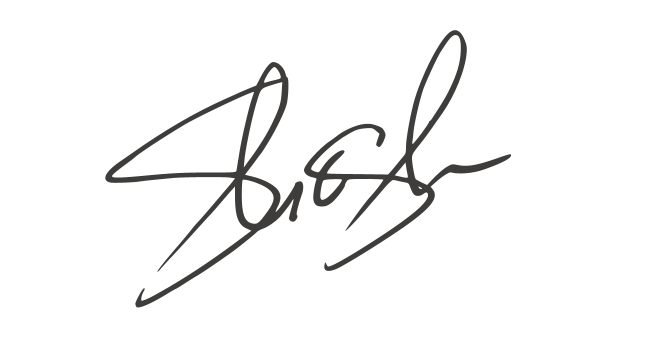

Saul Hudson (born 23 July 1965), known professionally as Slash, is a British and American musician, best known as the lead guitarist of the hard rock band Guns N' Roses, with whom he achieved worldwide success beginning in the late 1980s. He has received critical acclaim and is considered one of the greatest guitarists in history.

Born in Hampstead, London, and raised in Burslem, Stoke-on-Trent, Slash moved to Los Angeles with his father when he was six years old. His parents were both active in the entertainment industry, and he was given the nickname Slash as a child by actor Seymour Cassel. In 1983 he joined the glam metal band Hollywood Rose, then in 1985 he joined Guns N' Roses (which was composed of former members of Hollywood Rose and L.A. Guns), replacing founding member Tracii Guns.

Slash formed the supergroup Slash's Snakepit in 1994, and in 1996, after growing tensions with Axl Rose, he left Guns N' Roses. In 2002, he co-founded the supergroup Velvet Revolver with vocalist Scott Weiland, which re-established Slash as a mainstream performer in the mid- to late 2000s. Slash has released six solo albums: Slash (2010) and Orgy of the Damned (2024), featuring a variety of guest singers; Apocalyptic Love (2012); World on Fire (2014), Living the Dream (2018) and 4 (2022) with Myles Kennedy and the Conspirators. He returned to Guns N' Roses in 2016.

Time magazine named him runner-up (to Jimi Hendrix) on their list of "The 10 Best Electric Guitar Players" in 2009, while Rolling Stone placed him at number 65 on their list of "The 100 Greatest Guitarists of All Time" in 2011. Guitar World ranked his guitar solo in "November Rain" number 6 on their list of "The 100 Greatest Guitar Solos" in 2008, and Total Guitar placed his riff in "Sweet Child o' Mine" at number 1 on their list of "The 100 Greatest Riffs" in 2004. Gibson Guitar Corporation ranked Slash as number 34 on their "Top 50 Guitarists of All Time", while their readers landed him number 9 on Gibson's "Top 25 Guitarists of All Time". In 2012, he was inducted into the Rock and Roll Hall of Fame as a member of Guns N' Roses.

== Early life ==
Saul Hudson was born in Hampstead, London, on 23 July 1965, but raised in Blurton, a small suburb in Stoke-on-Trent, until age 6, before moving to Los Angeles, California. His father, Anthony Hudson, is an English artist known for creating album covers for musicians such as Neil Young and Joni Mitchell. His mother, Ola Hudson (née Oliver, died 2009), was an African-American fashion designer who created outfits for artists including John Lennon and The Pointer Sisters. He was named after cartoonist Saul Steinberg. Of his mixed background, Slash has remarked, "As a musician, I've always been amused that I'm both British and black; particularly because so many American musicians seem to aspire to be British while so many British musicians, in the '60s in particular, went to such great pains to be black."

Slash as a child

During his early years, Slash was raised by his father and paternal grandparents in Stoke-on-Trent while his mother moved back to her native United States to work in Los Angeles. When he was around five years old, he and his father joined his mother in Los Angeles. His brother, Albion "Ash" Hudson, was born in 1972. Following his parents' separation in 1974, Slash became a self-described "problem child". He chose to live with his mother and was often sent to live with his beloved maternal grandmother whenever his mother had to travel for her job. Slash sometimes accompanied his mother to work, where he met several film and music stars. He was given the nickname "Slash" by actor Seymour Cassel because he was "always in a hurry, zipping around from one thing to another".

My big awakening happened when I was 14. I'd been trying to get into this older girl's pants for a while, and she finally let me come over to her house. We hung out, smoked some pot and listened to Aerosmith's Rocks. It hit me like a fucking ton of bricks. I sat there listening to it over and over, and totally blew off this girl. I remember riding my bike back to my grandma's house knowing that my life had changed. Now I identified with something.

— Slash, on his passion for rock music

In 1979, Slash decided to form a band with his friend Steven Adler. The band never materialized, but it prompted Slash to take up an instrument. Since Adler had designated himself the role of guitarist, Slash decided to learn how to play bass. During his first lesson, Slash decided to switch from bass to guitar after meeting Robert Wolin, a teacher at Fairfax Music School, and hearing him play "Brown Sugar" by the Rolling Stones and a Cream song. As a result, Slash stated, "When I heard him do that, I said, 'That's what I want to do.'" Equipped with a flamenco guitar given to him by his grandmother, he began taking classes with Wolin. He vividly recalls the feeling after learning "Come Dancing" from Wired by Jeff Beck, which he described as "fucking awesome".

A champion BMX rider, Slash put the bike aside to devote himself to playing guitar, practicing up to 12 hours a day. Slash attended Beverly Hills High School and was a contemporary of musicians Lenny Kravitz and Zoro.

== Career ==
=== 1981–1985: early years ===
Slash joined his first band, Tidus Sloan, in 1981. In 1983, he formed the band Road Crew—named after the Motörhead song "(We Are) The Road Crew"—with his childhood friend Steven Adler, who by then had learned to play drums. He placed an advertisement in a newspaper looking for a bassist, and received a response from Duff McKagan. They auditioned a number of singers, including one-time Black Flag vocalist Ron Reyes. They worked on material that included the main riff of what became the Guns N' Roses song "Rocket Queen". Slash disbanded the group the following year due to them not being able to find a singer, as well as Adler's lack of work ethic compared to himself and McKagan. He, along with Adler, then joined a local band known as Hollywood Rose, which featured singer Axl Rose and guitarist Izzy Stradlin. Following his time with Hollywood Rose, Slash played in a band called Black Sheep and auditioned but was not chosen to play in Poison, a glam metal band that he later openly derided.

=== 1985–1996: first stint with Guns N' Roses ===
Slash in 1987

In May 1985, Slash was asked by Axl Rose and Izzy Stradlin to join their new band Guns N' Roses, along with Duff McKagan and Steven Adler (replacing founding members Tracii Guns, Ole Beich and Rob Gardner, respectively). They played Los Angeles-area nightclubs‍—‌such as the Whisky a Go Go, The Roxy, and The Troubadour‍—‌and opened for larger acts throughout 1985 and 1986. Before one of the shows in 1985, Slash shoplifted a black felt top hat and a Native American-style silver concho belt from two stores on Melrose Avenue in Los Angeles. He then combined the hat with parts of the belt to create a piece of custom headwear for the show. He said he "felt really cool" wearing the hat, and it became his trademark. It was during 1985–1986 that the band wrote most of its classic material, including "Welcome to the Jungle", "Sweet Child o' Mine", and "Paradise City". As a result of their rowdy and rebellious behavior, Guns N' Roses quickly received the moniker "Most Dangerous Band in the World", causing Slash to remark, "For some strange reason, Guns N' Roses is like the catalyst for controversy, even before we had any kind of record deal." After being scouted by several major record labels, the band signed with Geffen Records in March 1986.

In July 1987, Guns N' Roses released its debut album, Appetite for Destruction, which, as of September 2008, had sold over 28 million copies worldwide, 18 million of which were sold in the United States, making it the bestselling debut album of all time in the U.S. In the summer of 1988, the band achieved its only U.S. No. 1 hit with "Sweet Child O' Mine", a song spearheaded by Slash's guitar riff and solo. In November of that year, Guns N' Roses released G N' R Lies, which sold over five million copies in the U.S. alone, despite containing only eight tracks, four of which were included on the previously released EP Live ?!*@ Like a Suicide'. As their success grew, so did interpersonal tensions within the band. In 1989, during a show as opening act for the Rolling Stones, Axl Rose threatened to leave the band if certain members of the band did not stop "dancing with Mr. Brownstone", a reference to their song of the same name about heroin use. Slash was among those who promised to clean up. The following year, Adler was fired from the band because of his heroin addiction; he was replaced by Matt Sorum of the Cult.

In May 1991, the band embarked on the two-and-a-half-year-long Use Your Illusion Tour. The following September, Guns N' Roses released the long-awaited albums Use Your Illusion I and Use Your Illusion II, which debuted at No. 2 and No. 1, respectively, on the U.S. chart, a feat not achieved by any other group. Stradlin abruptly left the band in November; he was replaced by Gilby Clarke of Candy and Kill for Thrills. The tour ended on 17 July 1993. In November of that year, the band released "The Spaghetti Incident?", a cover album of mostly punk songs, which proved less successful than its predecessors. Slash then wrote several songs for what would have become the follow-up album to the Use Your Illusion double album. Rose and McKagan rejected the material.

With the band's failure to collaborate resulting in no album being recorded, Slash announced in October 1996 that he was no longer a part of Guns N' Roses. Slash stated at the time "Axl and I have not been capable of seeing eye to eye on Guns N' Roses for some time. We tried to collaborate, but at this point, I'm no longer in the band." Paul Tobias's inclusion in the band was another factor in Slash leaving, with Slash having both "creative and personal" differences with Tobias. In his 2007 autobiography, Slash stated that his decision to leave the band was not based on artistic differences with Rose, but on Rose's constant lateness to concerts, the alleged legal manipulation Rose used (since denied by Rose) to gain control of the band, and the departures of Adler and Stradlin.

=== 1994–2002: Slash's Snakepit ===
In 1994, Slash formed Slash's Snakepit, a side project that featured his Guns N' Roses bandmates Matt Sorum and Gilby Clarke on drums and rhythm guitar respectively, as well as Alice in Chains' Mike Inez on bass and Jellyfish's Eric Dover on vocals. The band recorded Slash's material originally intended for Guns N' Roses, resulting in the release of It's Five O'Clock Somewhere in February 1995. The album was critically praised for ignoring the then-popular conventions of alternative music, and fared well on the charts, eventually selling over one million copies in the U.S. alone despite little promotion from Geffen Records. Slash's Snakepit toured in support of the album with bassist James LoMenzo and drummer Brian Tichy of Pride & Glory, before disbanding in 1996. Slash then toured for two years with the blues rock cover band Slash's Blues Ball.

In 1999, Slash chose to regroup Slash's Snakepit with Rod Jackson on vocals, Ryan Roxie on rhythm guitar, Johnny Griparic on bass, and Matt Laug on drums. Their second album, Ain't Life Grand, was released in October 2000 through Koch Records. It did not sell as well as the band's previous release, and its critical reception was mixed. To promote the album, the band—with Keri Kelli on rhythm guitar—embarked on an extensive world tour in support of AC/DC in the summer of 2000, followed by their own headlining theater tour. Slash disbanded Snakepit in 2002.

=== 2002–2008: Velvet Revolver ===
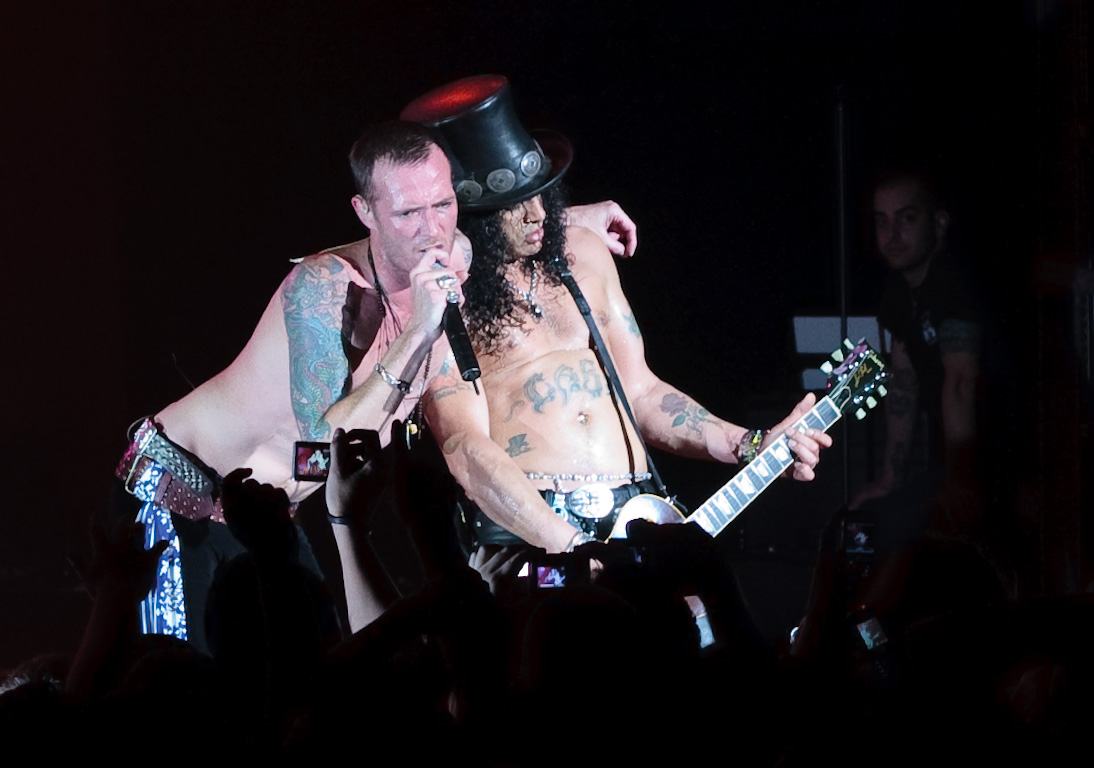
Slash and Scott Weiland during a Velvet Revolver concert in London in 2007

In 2002, Slash reunited with Duff McKagan and Matt Sorum for a Randy Castillo tribute concert. Realizing that they still had the chemistry of their days in Guns N' Roses, they decided to form a new band together. Former Guns N' Roses guitarist Izzy Stradlin was initially involved, but left after the others decided to find a lead singer. Dave Kushner, who had previously played with McKagan in Loaded, then joined the band on rhythm guitar. For many months, the four searched for a lead singer by listening to offered demo tapes, a monotonous process documented by VH1. Eventually, former Stone Temple Pilots vocalist Scott Weiland joined the band.

In 2003, Velvet Revolver played several concerts during the summer and released their first single, "Set Me Free". In June 2004, they released their debut album, Contraband, which debuted at No. 1 on the U.S. chart and sold two million copies, re-establishing Slash as a mainstream performer. A year-and-a-half-long tour followed in support of the album. In 2005, the band was nominated for three Grammy Awards: Rock Album of the Year, Rock Song, and Hard Rock Performance for their Contraband single "Slither" which won their first and only Grammy. In July 2007, Velvet Revolver released their second album, Libertad, and embarked on a second tour. During a show in March 2008, Weiland announced to the audience that it would be the band's final tour; he was fired from the band in April 2008 and Slash insisted "chemical issues" led to the split. The following month Weiland rejoined Stone Temple Pilots. Despite Weiland's departure, Velvet Revolver did not officially disband.

In early 2010, Velvet Revolver began writing new songs and auditioning new singers. By January 2011, the band had recorded nine demos, and was reportedly due to make a decision on their singer. The following April, Slash stated that they had been unable to find a suitable singer and that Velvet Revolver would remain on hiatus for the next few years while its members focus on other projects.

=== 2009–present: "Slash featuring Myles Kennedy and the Conspirators" ===
Band members

Current members

- Myles Kennedy – lead vocals (2010–present)
- Todd Kerns – bass, backing vocals (2010–present)
- Brent Fitz – drums (2010–present)
- Frank Sidoris – rhythm guitar (2018–present; touring member only 2012–2016)

Touring members

- Tony Montana – bass (2010)

Past members

- Bobby Schneck – rhythm guitar (2010–2011)

Session musicians

- Chris Chaney – bass (2009)
- Josh Freese – drums (2009)
- Lenny Castro – percussion (2009)

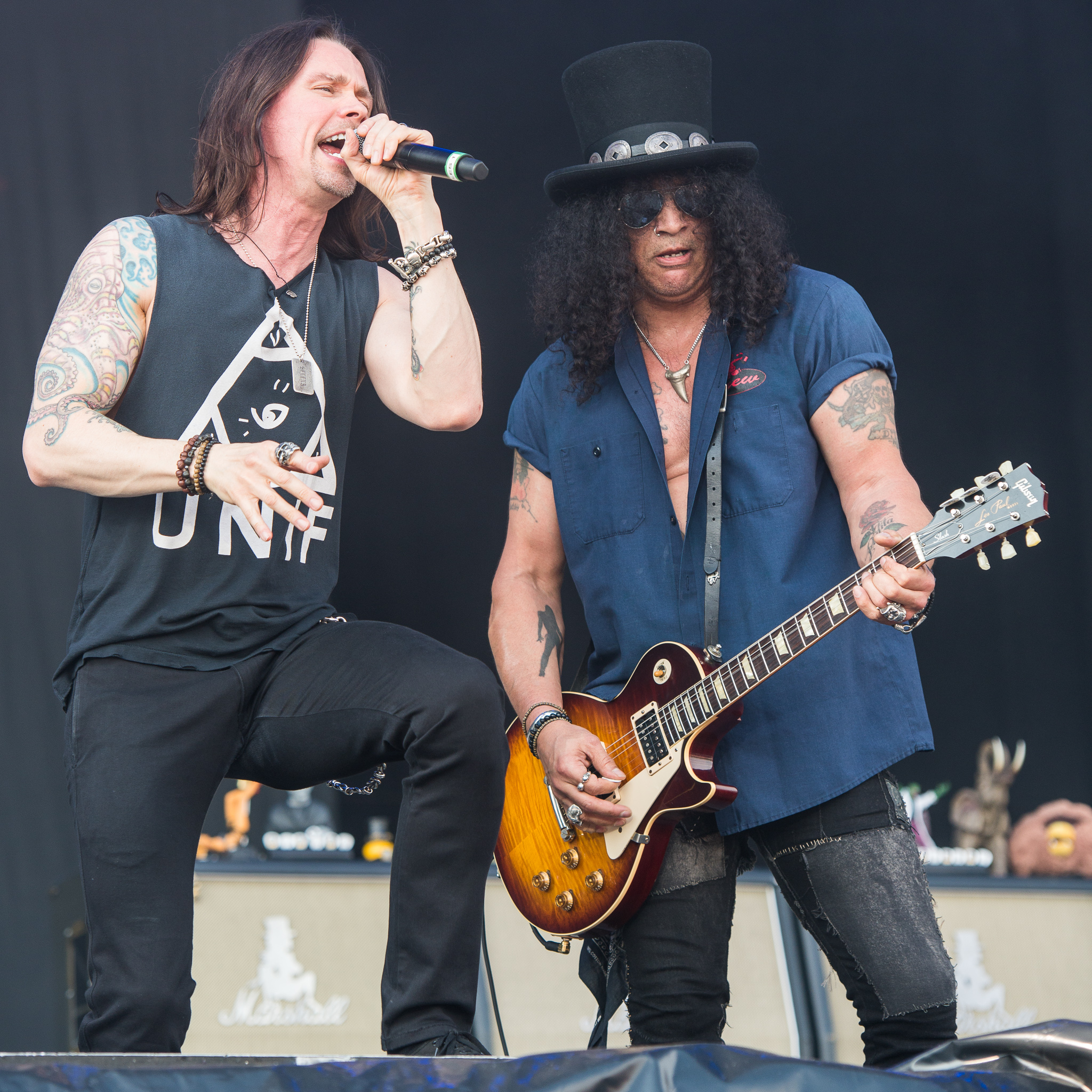
Slash and vocalist Myles Kennedy performing with the Conspirators in June 2015

In September 2008, Slash began production on his debut solo album. He described the process of recording by himself as "cathartic". He also mentioned working on the album gave him a chance to "...take a little bit of a break from all the politics and the democracy that is a band and just sort of do my own thing for a little bit." Slash's wife Perla revealed that many different artists would appear on the album, saying, "It's going to be Slash and friends, with everyone from Ozzy to Fergie." The album, simply titled Slash, debuted at No. 3 on the U.S. chart upon its release in April 2010. It featured an all-star roster of guest musicians, including Osbourne, Fergie of the Black Eyed Peas, Adam Levine of Maroon 5, M. Shadows of Avenged Sevenfold, Lemmy Kilmister of Motörhead, Dave Grohl, Chris Cornell and Iggy Pop. The album also features musical collaborations with former Guns N' Roses members Izzy Stradlin, Steven Adler and Duff McKagan. Preceding the release of the album, Slash had released the Japan-only single "Sahara", featuring Japanese vocalist Koshi Inaba (from B'z). It charted at number four on the Oricon Singles Chart, as well number six on the Billboard Japan Hot 100. It was awarded Western "Single of the Year" award at the 24th Japan Gold Disc Award by the RIAJ. To promote the album, Slash embarked on his first solo world tour with Myles Kennedy of Alter Bridge—who also appeared on the album—on vocals, Bobby Schneck on rhythm guitar, Todd Kerns on bass, and Brent Fitz on drums. Slash opened for Ozzy Osbourne for a leg of Osbourne's Scream World Tour.

Slash began working on his second solo album in June 2011. He collaborated with his touring bandmates Myles Kennedy, Todd Kerns, and Brent Fitz, with the resulting album billed to "Slash featuring Myles Kennedy and the Conspirators". The album, titled Apocalyptic Love, was released on 22 May 2012, debuting at No. 2 on the Canadian Albums Chart. In 2013 Slash received the award for "Best Guitarist of the Year 2012" from Loudwire.

Slash embarked on a tour in the summer of 2014, opening for Aerosmith as part of the Let Rock Rule Tour. In May 2014, Slash revealed details of his third solo album World on Fire. The album was again billed as "Slash featuring Myles Kennedy and the Conspirators" and was released on 10 September 2014. It debuted at No. 10 on the Billboard 200 chart.

In March 2018, Slash revealed that a new album with Myles Kennedy and the Conspirators was to be released later in the year. In June 2018, he announced that the album was titled Living the Dream, to be released on 21 September 2018. The group tour for the album began in September 2018, starting with a show in Del Mar, California at the KAABOO Del Mar Music Festival. The tour was concluded the U.S. and Canada again 2019 after completing the Asian leg and Hawaii show with Guns N' Roses. Former touring guitarist Frank Sidoris joined the band full-time for the recording sessions.

In an October 2020, bassist Todd Kerns confirmed that there would be a new album in 2021, referred to as SMKC4. On 26 July 2021, it was confirmed that the record was to be released by Gibson's new record label Gibson Records in February 2022. On 18 October 2021, Slash confirmed the first single's title "The River is Rising", along with its release date, 22 October 2021. On 22 October, the release day of first single, it was announced that the album 4 would be released on 11 February 2022. The tour was also announced the same day, scheduled to start 8 February 2022, in Portland, Oregon.

=== 2016–present: return to Guns N' Roses ===
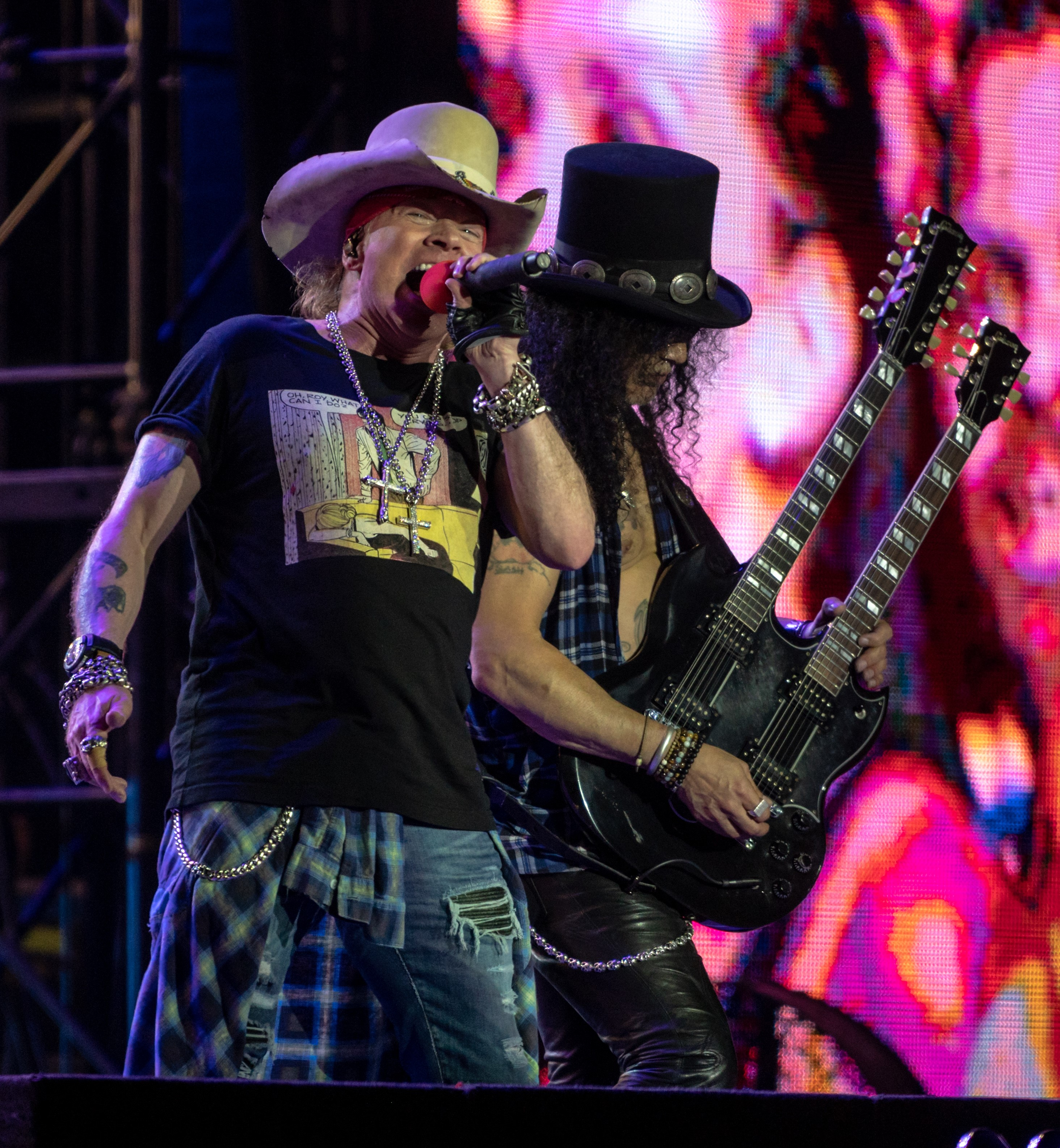
Axl Rose (left) and Slash (right) performing with Guns N' Roses in 2018

On 29 December 2015, several days after a Guns N' Roses-related teaser was released to movie theaters, Billboard reported that Slash would rejoin the band to headline Coachella 2016, filling the lead guitarist spot vacated when DJ Ashba left the band. Guns N' Roses were officially announced as headliners of Coachella on 4 January 2016, with KROQ reporting Slash and Duff McKagan would rejoin the band. Slash performed with Guns N' Roses for the first time in 23 years during the band's secret warmup gig at the Troubadour in Los Angeles on 1 April 2016. The band then embarked on the Not in This Lifetime... Tour, which became a massive success, grossing $584 million by its conclusion in 2019. In 2021, Slash appeared on his first songs with the band since 1994, "Absurd" and "Hard Skool". In 2023 the band went on tour again, notably playing both the Glastonbury Festival in England and the Power Trip Festival in Indio, California. They also released two new singles, "Perhaps" and "The General". Slash performed on the new singles "Nothin'" and "Atlas" in 2025.

=== Session work ===
In 1991, Slash played lead guitar on the single "Give In to Me" off Michael Jackson's album Dangerous, as well as for the opening skit of the video for the song "Black or White" off the same album. In 1995, he played guitar on "D.S.", a controversial song from Jackson's HIStory: Past, Present and Future, Book I album, and in 1997 appeared on the song "Morphine" off the remix album Blood on the Dance Floor: History in the Mix. Slash also joined Jackson on several occasions on stage, most notably at the 1995 MTV Video Music Awards playing with Jackson on "Black or White" (and the introduction of "Billie Jean"). He made two surprise appearances during Jackson's 1992 Dangerous World Tour in Spain and Japan and supported the 1999 charity concerts MJ & Friends in Seoul and Munich playing the same set as he did for 1995's MTV Video Music Awards. The last time Slash and Jackson shared a stage was on both 2001 Michael Jackson: 30th Anniversary Special concerts in New York City playing "Black or White" and "Beat It".

Slash played guitar on "Wiggle Wiggle", the opening song on Bob Dylan's 1990 record Under the Red Sky. With Dylan's direction to "play like (...) Django Reinhardt", Slash recalls "[he] just learned it on the spot. It was such a simple, yet superb I, IV, V progression that there is really nothing much to say about it." The following year, he collaborated with Lenny Kravitz on "Always on the Run", the lead single from Kravitz' album Mama Said. In 1993, Slash appeared on the album Stone Free: A Tribute to Jimi Hendrix, performing "I Don't Live Today" with Paul Rodgers and Band of Gypsys. Slash also guest appeared in Carole King's 1994 live concert, which was captured on her Carole King – In Concert album. Slash and King appeared on David Letterman to promote the concert. In 1996, he collaborated with Marta Sánchez to record the flamenco-inspired song "Obsession Confession" for the Curdled soundtrack. Later that year, he played with Alice Cooper at Sammy Hagar's club Cabo Wabo in Cabo San Lucas, Mexico. The show was released the following year as A Fistful of Alice. In 1997, Slash appeared alongside rapper Ol' Dirty Bastard and rock band Fishbone on Blackstreet's rock remix of their single "Fix"; he also appeared in the accompanying music video. Also in 1997, he played on the single "But You Said I'm Useless" by Japanese musician J. That same year, he contributed music to the soundtrack of Quentin Tarantino's Jackie Brown; several compositions by Slash's Snakepit can be heard throughout the film. He also appeared on the Insane Clown Posse album The Great Milenko on the track "Halls of Illusions".

In 2002, Slash played on the title track to Elán's album Street Child. In 2003, he participated in the Yardbirds' comeback record Birdland; he played lead guitar on the track "Over, Under, Sideways, Down". In 2006, Slash played on a cover of "In the Summertime" on keyboardist Derek Sherinian's solo album Blood of the Snake; he was also featured in the accompanying music video. In 2007, he appeared on Paulina Rubio's single "Nada Puede Cambiarme". In 2008, Slash played guitar on the film score of The Wrestler, composed by Clint Mansell. Slash was the featured guitarist on the 2008 Italian hit single "Gioca Con Me" by Italian singer-songwriter Vasco Rossi. In 2009, he was featured on Rihanna's single "Rockstar 101" off her album Rated R. In 2011, he contributed the song "Kick It Up a Notch" to the Disney Channel animation Phineas and Ferb the Movie: Across the 2nd Dimension; he appeared in both live-action and animated form in the promotional music video. In 2024, he contributed guitar to a re-release of Mark Knopfler's "Going Home: Theme of the Local Hero" in aid of the Teenage Cancer Trust.

=== Other ventures ===
A self-described "film buff", Slash has had small parts in several films and television series. In 1988, he appeared with his Guns N' Roses bandmates in the Dirty Harry film The Dead Pool, in which his character attends a musician's funeral and shoots a harpoon. He played radio DJ Hank in a 1994 episode of the horror anthology television series Tales from the Crypt. Slash was a guest star in an episode of the live-action/animated talk show Space Ghost Coast to Coast on Cartoon Network, where Space Ghost, Zorak, and Moltar teach him how to do guitar licks, but he refuses to do any of that. In 1999, he appeared as the host of the Miss America Bag Lady pageant in the widely panned film The Underground Comedy Movie. He has also appeared as himself in several projects, including Howard Stern's Private Parts in 1997, The Drew Carey Show in 1998, MADtv in 2005, and Sacha Baron Cohen's Brüno in 2009. Slash voiced a recurring caricature of himself in Robert Evans' animated television series Kid Notorious, which aired in 2003 on Comedy Central. As in real life, Slash is Evans' close friend and next-door neighbor on the show. He played one of the guys with a "Drums" shirt in the television show Metalocalypse on Adult Swim. On 5 May 2009, he appeared as the guest mentor for the rock 'n' roll week of American Idol. In 2010, Slash formed Slasher Films, a horror film production company. Its first film, Nothing Left to Fear, was screened in select cities on 4 October 2013, before being released on DVD and Blu-ray the following Tuesday. Slash appeared on the 26 October 2014 episode of Talking Dead. He is reported to be a massive fan of horror movies.

Slash's autobiography, simply titled Slash, was published on 30 October 2007. It was co-written with Anthony Bozza. Slash also made several contributions to The Heroin Diaries: A Year in the Life of a Shattered Rock Star, the autobiography of Mötley Crüe bassist and back-up singer Nikki Sixx, which was also published in 2007.

Slash is a pinball enthusiast and collector. He participated in the design process for the 1994 Data East Guns N' Roses pinball machine, as well as the 2020 Jersey Jack Pinball machine of the same theme, and provided music for the 1998 Sega machine Viper Night Drivin', and Jersey Jack Pinball machines The Godfather and Sonic. For his work in the design of the 1994 and 2020 Guns N' Roses pinball machines and for increasing the awareness of pinball he was inducted into the U.K. Pinball Hall of Fame in June 2026.

Slash is a playable character in the video game Guitar Hero III: Legends of Rock, released in 2007. His performance was motion captured to record his movements for the game. Slash's character becomes playable after a player beats him in a one-on-one competition, which then leads to the player and Slash playing the master track of "Welcome to the Jungle". Guitar learning game/simulator Rocksmith 2014 by Ubisoft released a Slash Song Pack with several of the latter compositions by the artist available to purchase as downloadable content and learn on the guitar.

A keen artist, Slash designed logos and artwork for several of his pre-Guns N' Roses bands, as well as the famous circular GN'R logo. He is also credited as having provided some artwork for Aerosmith's 2012 album, Music From Another Dimension!, as it reproduces a picture of the band drawn by Slash when he was still a teenager.

In 2012, Slash appeared as the Star in a Reasonably Priced Car in episode 7, series 18 of Top Gear, setting a wet lap time of 1:49.8 in the Kia Cee'd. He also played a cover of the Top Gear theme "Jessica" over the episode's closing credits.

Slash is a fan of the Angry Birds series of video games, and created a hard rock version of the Angry Birds Space theme song. In addition, Slash has a Birds avatar shown in the game, released in March 2013.

In December 2025, Slash, McKagan, Andrew Watt, and Chad Smith performed under the band name The Dirty Bats. They were joined onstage by Bruno Mars, Brandi Carlile, Anthony Kiedis, Yungblud, and Eddie Vedder.

== Personal life ==
Slash is a dual citizen of the United Kingdom and the United States. A British national since his birth, he has resided in Los Angeles since 1971, but did not acquire American citizenship until 1996. He said in 2010, "I do consider myself British. I have very strong feelings about my British heritage. My first years were there, I went to school there, and I have seemingly endless family on that side of the pond. So I've always felt most comfortable in England."

In 2001, at the age of 35, Slash was diagnosed with cardiomyopathy, a form of congestive heart failure, caused by his many years of alcohol and drug abuse. Originally given between six days and six weeks to live, he survived through physical therapy and the implantation of a defibrillator. Slash has been clean and sober since 2006, which he credited to his then-wife Perla Ferrar. In 2009, following his mother's death from lung cancer, he quit smoking.

Slash's friendship with Guns N' Roses frontman Axl Rose soured following his departure from the band. In 2006, Rose claimed that Slash had shown up at his house uninvited the previous year to offer a truce. He alleged that Slash had insulted his Velvet Revolver bandmates, telling Rose that he considered Scott Weiland "a fraud", and Duff McKagan "spineless", and that he "hated" Matt Sorum. Slash denied the accusations. In his 2007 autobiography, he admitted to visiting Rose's home with the intention to settle a longstanding legal dispute, and to make peace with his former bandmate. He claims that he did not speak with Rose and instead merely left a note. Slash maintained that he had not spoken with Rose in person since 1996. In 2009, in response to a statement by Rose in which he referred to Slash as "a cancer", Slash commented: "It doesn't really affect me at all... It's been a long time. The fact that he has anything to say at all, it's like, 'Whatever, dude.' It doesn't really matter." In an August 2015 interview, Slash stated that he and Rose had reconciled. He subsequently rejoined Guns N' Roses in 2016. Slash later stated about the feud that "We had a lot of issues born out of third-party stuff. It was very insidious, and the longer we didn't talk, the more it got blown out of proportion".

=== Family ===
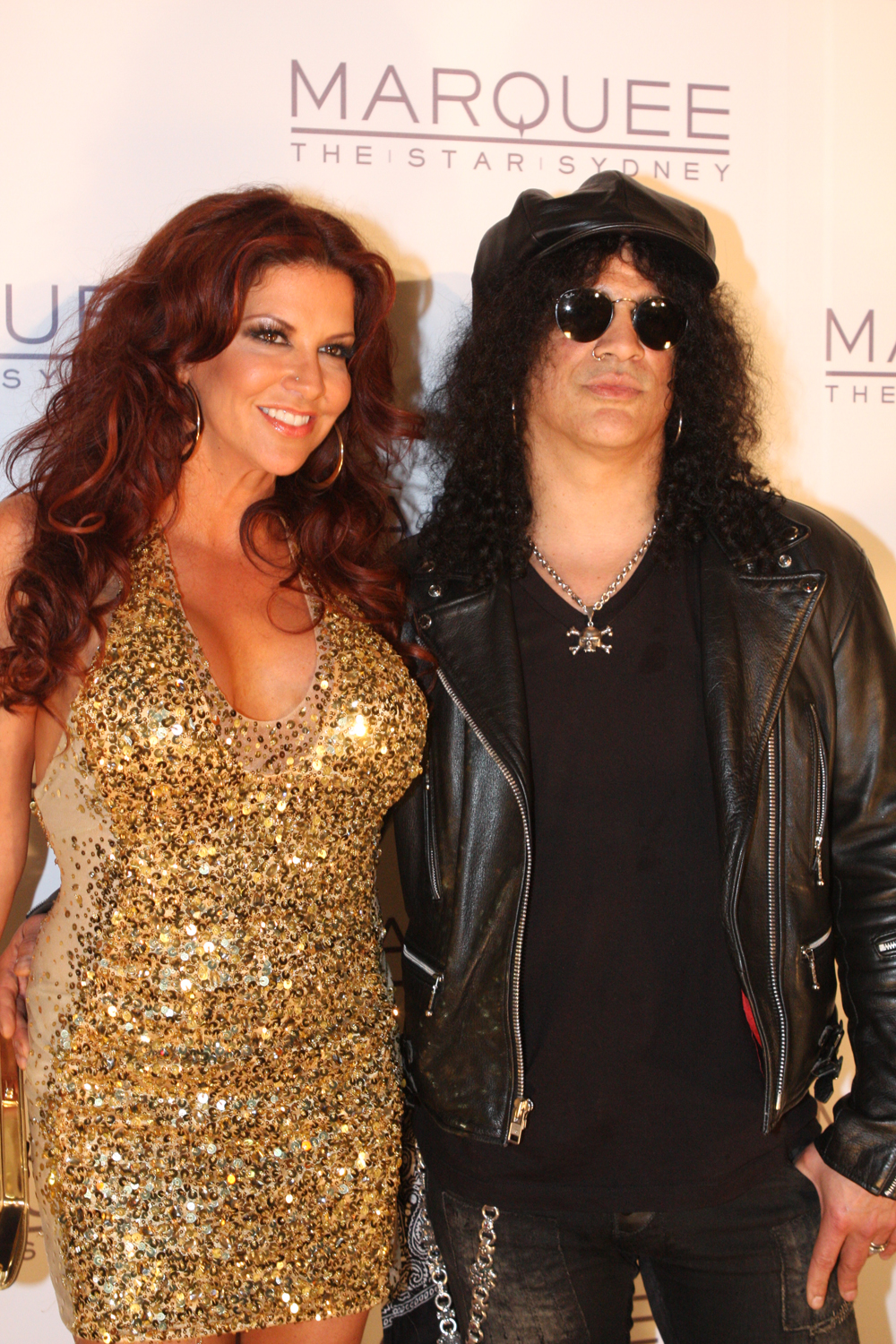
Slash with then-wife Perla Ferrar in 2012

On 10 October 1992, Slash married model-actress Renée Suran in Marina del Rey, California. They divorced in late 1997 after five years of marriage.

Slash married Perla Ferrar on 15 October 2001, in Hawaii. They have two sons. Slash filed for divorce from Ferrar in August 2010, but the couple reconciled two months later. In December 2014, he again filed for divorce. Slash's son London debuted his band Suspect208 in late 2020. The band also featured Robert Trujillo's son Tye Trujillo on bass, and Scott Weiland's son Noah Weiland on vocals. Slash promoted the band on his social media accounts. London is currently the drummer for the band Return to Dust.

Slash is currently in a relationship with Meegan Hodges whom he first dated in 1989 and reconnected with in 2015.

=== Philanthropy ===
Slash is an honorary board member of Music Will (formerly called Little Kids Rock) a national nonprofit that works to restore and rejuvenate music education programs in disadvantaged public schools. He has visited Music Will students, jammed with them, and donated instruments and his time.

Slash has been recognized for his longtime contributions to establishing environmental welfare programs. He is a board trustee of the Greater Los Angeles Zoo Association, and has long supported the Los Angeles Zoo and zoos around the world. Slash's love of reptiles was, for many years, a notable aspect of his public persona, with several of his many snakes appearing with him in music videos and photoshoots, until the birth of his first son in 2002 impelled him to find a new home for his collection.

=== Legal issues ===
In 1985, Rose and Slash were charged with felony statutory rape following allegations that Rose had engaged in sexual activity with 15-year-old Michelle Rhoades. Rhoades had claimed that Rose had raped her but had not made any allegation against Slash. In his memoir, Slash described a woman who had engaged in sexual activity with Rose in the loft of their rehearsal studio and later got into a fight with Rose and "freaked out intensely," resulting in Rose locking her out of the studio. Slash said, "Axl told her to leave and tried throwing her out. I attempted to help mediate the situation to get her out quietly, but that wasn’t happening." Slash and Rose spent several weeks as fugitives after the charges were filed, which were later dropped by the police for lack of evidence.

Slash was arrested in July 1999 for allegedly assaulting his then-girlfriend.

== Accolades ==
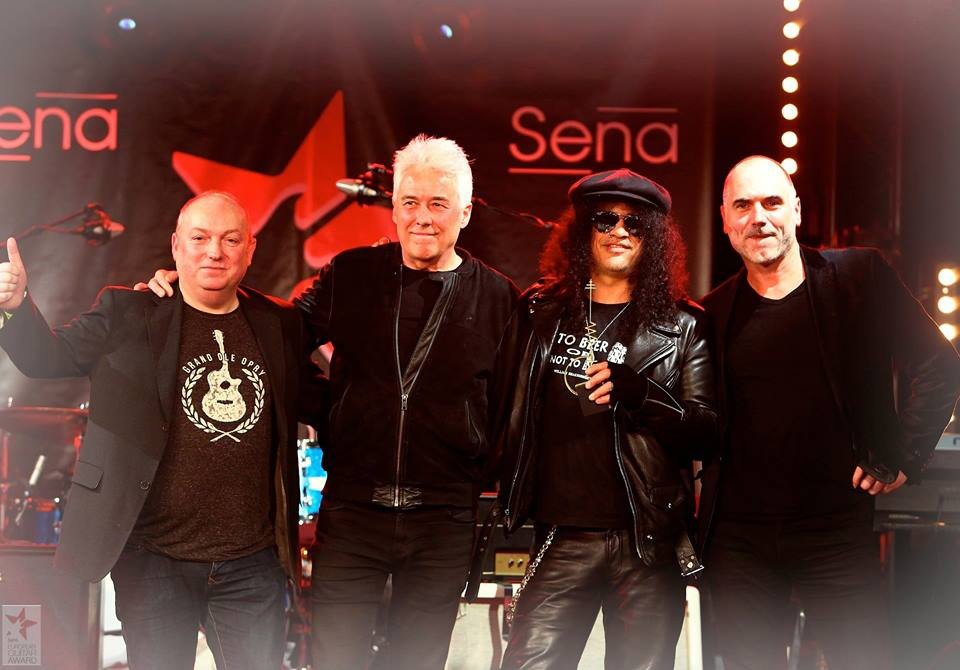
Slash in 2014 after receiving the Sena Performers European Guitar Award, alongside the previous year's winner George Kooymans from Golden Earring to the left.

Slash has received critical acclaim as a guitarist. In 2005, he was named "Best Guitarist" by Esquire, which congratulated him on "beating the comeback odds with a surprisingly legitimate and vital outfit, Velvet Revolver." Slash was awarded the title of "Riff Lord" during Metal Hammer's fourth annual Golden Gods awards in 2007. In 2008, he was ranked No. 21 on Gigwise's list of "The 50 Greatest Guitarists Ever", and in 2009, he was named runner-up on "The 10 Best Electric Guitar Players" list in Time, which praised him as "a remarkably precise player". In 2011, Rolling Stone placed Slash at No. 65 on their list of "The 100 Greatest Guitarists of All Time".

In 2007, Slash was honored with a star on the Rock Walk of Fame; his name was placed alongside Jimmy Page, Eddie Van Halen and Jimi Hendrix. He was the honoree at the 2010 Sunset Strip Music Festival, where he was presented by West Hollywood mayor John Heilman with a plaque declaring August 26 as "Slash Day". In 2012, Slash was inducted into the Rock and Roll Hall of Fame as a member of the classic lineup of Guns N' Roses. He performed three songs—"Paradise City", "Sweet Child o' Mine" and "Mr. Brownstone"‍—‌with fellow inductees Duff McKagan, Steven Adler, and Matt Sorum, one-time Guns N' Roses guitarist Gilby Clarke, and his frequent collaborator Myles Kennedy. Inductees Axl Rose, Izzy Stradlin and Dizzy Reed declined to attend. Later that year, Slash received a star on the Hollywood Walk of Fame, located directly in front of the Hard Rock Cafe on Hollywood Boulevard.

In 2004, Slash's introductory riff in "Sweet Child o' Mine" was voted No. 1 on a list of "The 100 Greatest Riffs" by the readers of Total Guitar; his riffs in "Out ta Get Me" (No. 51), "Welcome to the Jungle" (No. 21), and "Paradise City" (No. 19) also made the list. In 2006, his solo in "Paradise City" was voted No. 3 by Total Guitar's readers on a list of "The 100 Hottest Guitar Solos"; his solos in "Sweet Child o' Mine" and "November Rain" were ranked No. 30 and No. 82 respectively. In 2008, Guitar World placed Slash's solo in "November Rain" at No. 6 on their list of "The 100 Greatest Guitar Solos", while his solo in "Sweet Child o' Mine" was ranked No. 37 on the list. In 2010, the readers of Total Guitar voted his riff in "Slither" runner-up on the list of "The 50 Greatest Riffs of the Decade", while his riff in "By the Sword" was ranked No. 22. Slash received a Radio Contraband Rock Radio Award in 2012. In January 2015 Slash received the Les Paul award.

== Equipment ==
Slash owns more than 400 guitars. He prefers the Gibson Les Paul, which he has called "the best all-around guitar for me." Gibson has credited him and Zakk Wylde with bringing the Les Paul back into the mainstream in the late 1980s. His main studio guitar is a 1959 Gibson Les Paul Standard replica, built by luthier Kris Derrig, which he came to own during the recording sessions for Guns N' Roses' debut album, Appetite for Destruction. He used that guitar on every subsequent album he recorded with Guns N' Roses and Velvet Revolver. For many years, his main live guitar was a 1988 Gibson Les Paul Standard.

Signature guitars
- Gibson Custom Shop's Slash "Snakepit" Les Paul Standard (1998)
- Epiphone's Slash "Snakepit" Les Paul Standard (1998)
- Gibson Custom Shop's Slash Signature Les Paul Standard (2004)
- Epiphone's Slash Signature Les Paul Standard Plus Top (2004)
- Gibson USA's Slash Signature Les Paul Standard (2008)
- Gibson Custom Shop's Slash "Inspired By" Les Paul Standard (2008)
- Gibson USA's Slash Signature Les Paul Goldtop (2008)
- Epiphone's Slash Signature Les Paul Goldtop (2008)
- Gibson USA's Slash "Appetite" Les Paul Standard (2010)
- Gibson Custom Shop's Slash "Appetite" Les Paul Standard (2010)
- Epiphone's Slash "Appetite" Les Paul Standard (2010)
- Gibson USA's Slash "Rosso Corsa" Les Paul Standard (2013)
- Gibson USA's Slash "Vermillion" Les Paul Standard (2013)
- Gibson Custom Shop's Slash Anaconda Burst Les Paul (Plain Top/Flame Top) (2017)
- Epiphone Slash Anaconda Burst Les Paul (Plain Top/Flame Top) (2017)
- Gibson Custom Shop's Slash Firebird (Trans Black/Trans White) (2017)
- Gibson Custom Shop's Slash 1958 Les Paul "First Standard" Replica (2017)
- Gibson Custom Shop's Slash 1966 EDS-1275 Double-Neck (Ebony) (2019)
- Gibson USA's Slash Les Paul Standard (November Burst/Appetite Burst/Vermillion Burst) (2020)
- Gibson USA's Slash J-45 (November Burst/Vermillion Burst) (2020)

Since 1997, Slash has collaborated with Gibson on seventeen signature Les Paul models, including five through Gibson USA, seven through the Gibson Custom Shop, and five through the Gibson subsidiary Epiphone. Slash also plays various other Gibson guitars, including Firebirds and Explorers. He also plays or has played guitars by a plethora of other brands, including B.C. Rich with whom he has designed several custom models based on their Mockingbird and Bich designs. He has used guitars by Fender, Gretsch, Jackson, and Martin. He has also collaborated on signature equipment with other companies. In 1996, Marshall introduced the Marshall Slash Signature JCM 2555, an authentic reissue of the Marshall "Silver Jubilee" JCM 2555 released in 1987. It was the first signature amp ever produced by Marshall, with production limited to 3000. In 2007, Jim Dunlop introduced the Crybaby SW-95 Slash Signature Wah, designed after Slash's own custom-built Crybaby wah pedal. In 2010, Seymour Duncan introduced the Alnico II Pro Slash APH-2 pickups, which were designed to recreate the tone of Slash's main studio guitar. Also in 2010, Marshall introduced the Marshall AFD100, a recreation of the Marshall 1959 that Slash used for the recording of Appetite for Destruction, with production limited to 2300.

On stage, Slash prefers Marshall amplifiers, particularly the Marshall "Silver Jubilee" JCM 2555 amp. He used a rented early-1970s Marshall 1959 for the recording of Appetite for Destruction. Slash enjoyed the amp so much that he tried to keep it, telling the rental company, S.I.R., that it had been stolen. The amp was repossessed by S.I.R. employees after a roadie accidentally brought it to rehearsals at the store. For the recording of Velvet Revolver's debut album, Contraband, he used a Vox AC30 amp and small Fender tube amps, and on their second album, Libertad, he used the Marshall "Vintage Modern" 2466 amp. On his eponymous debut solo album, he used a Marshall JCM 800, issued as "#34", and later, on the subsequent world tour, Slash used his signature Marshall AFD100 amp.

In a 2018 interview, Slash said he did not use many pedals aside from an occasional phase, but was influenced to play electric guitar when he was younger when he played his guitar through a MXR Distortion + pedal.

For his solo blues record, Orgy of the Damned, Slash wished to explore different tones compared to the Marshall sound he was known for, having come to view that sound as "very predictable." Slash experimented with Fender and Vox amps, but it was a 50-watt Magnatone M-80 amp he had been given but never played that he ultimately used on every song on the album. Slash replaced his traditional Marshalls with Magnatones on the following Guns N' Roses tour without making it public and subsequently announced he was developing a signature model with the brand. That model, the SL-100, debuted in late 2023 and combines the voicings of Slash's favored Marshall Jubilee and Super Lead amps. Slash later clarified he was not ending his partnership with Marshall.

== Discography ==
With Guns N' Roses

- Appetite for Destruction (1987)
- G N' R Lies (1988)
- Use Your Illusion I (1991)
- Use Your Illusion II (1991)
- "The Spaghetti Incident?" (1993)

With Slash's Snakepit

- It's Five O'Clock Somewhere (1995)
- Ain't Life Grand (2000)

With Velvet Revolver

- Contraband (2004)
- Libertad (2007)

Solo albums

- Slash (2010)
- Orgy of the Damned (2024)

Slash featuring Myles Kennedy & the Conspirators

- Apocalyptic Love (2012)
- World on Fire (2014)
- Living the Dream (2018)
- 4 (2022)
- Flying Blind (2027)

== General references ==
- Slash; Bozza, Anthony (2008). Slash. HarperCollins. ISBN 978-0-00-725777-5.
