= Iancu v. Brunetti =

- Supreme Court of the United States

Argued April 15, 2019 Decided June 24, 2019
- Full case name: Andrei Iancu, Under Secretary of Commerce for Intellectual Property and Director, Patent and Trademark Office v. Erik Brunetti
- Docket no.: 18-302
- Citations: 588 U.S. 388 (more) 139 S. Ct. 2294; 204 L. Ed. 2d 714
- Argument: Oral argument

Case history
- Prior: In re Brunetti, 877 F.3d 1330 (Fed. Cir. 2017); cert. granted, 139 S. Ct. 782 (2019).

Holding
- The Lanham Act prohibition on the registration of "immoral" or "scandalous" trademarks infringes the First Amendment.

Court membership
- Chief Justice John Roberts Associate Justices Clarence Thomas · Ruth Bader Ginsburg; Stephen Breyer · Samuel Alito; Sonia Sotomayor · Elena Kagan; Neil Gorsuch · Brett Kavanaugh

Case opinions
- Majority: Kagan, joined by Thomas, Ginsburg, Alito, Gorsuch, Kavanaugh
- Concurrence: Alito
- Concur/dissent: Roberts
- Concur/dissent: Breyer
- Concur/dissent: Sotomayor, joined by Breyer

Laws applied
- U.S. Const. amend. I; Lanham Act

Iancu v. Brunetti, No. 18–302, 588 U.S. 388 (2019), is a Supreme Court of the United States case related to the registration of trademarks under the Lanham Act. It decided 6–3 that the provisions of the Lanham Act prohibiting registration of trademarks of "immoral" or "scandalous" matter is unconstitutional by permitting the United States Patent & Trademark Office to engage in viewpoint discrimination, which violates the Free Speech Clause of the First Amendment.

== Legal background ==
Section 2(a) of the Lanham Act, passed in 1946, holds that a trademark may be refused registration by the United States Patent and Trademark Office if the subject consists of "immoral, deceptive, or scandalous matter." Section 2(a) had also held that trademarks may be refused if they were deemed "disparaging" to individuals or groups, but the Supreme Court unanimously ruled in Matal v. Tam (2017) that the restriction on "disparaging" trademarks was unconstitutional under the First Amendment.

== Case background ==
Erik Brunetti started a clothing line with the skateboarder Natas Kaupas in 1990 and used the name Fuct (stylized as "FUCT"). Fuct stood as an initialism for "Friends U Can't Trust," but Brunetti felt its phonetic closeness to the expletive "fucked" was humorous. Around 2010, Brunetti saw a number of knockoffs of his clothing line being sold on eBay and other Internet sites that inappropriately used the "Fuct" label. In 2011, Brunetti sought to register the trademark on Fuct to stop the knockoffs but was denied registration by the Office Examiner. It stated the word was phonetically similar to the expletive "fucked," which was well-established as a "scandalous" word under Section 2(a) of the Lanham Act. The decision was upheld by the Trademark Trial and Appeal Board (TTAB) in 2014.

Brunetti then appealed the decision to the United States Court of Appeals for the Federal Circuit with support of the American Civil Liberties Union (ACLU). The ACLU argued that the Supreme Court had already ruled there was a higher level of scrutiny when the mere display of a potentially offensive word can be regulated from the 1971 case Cohen v. California. In 2017, the Federal Circuit agreed with the TTAB that "Fuct" would fall under the definition of a "scandalous" word for not only its similarity to the vulgar word but also the use of such words in the target youthful market for the clothing line. However, the Federal Circuit also ruled that the restriction against "scandalous" words of Section 2(a) of the Lanham Act was unconstitutional as it violated Brunetti's rights to free speech, particularly in light of the government failing to take any steps to regulate such speech across the Internet, and it reversed the TTAB's holdings. The Federal Circuit referred to its prior decision and its Supreme Court affirmation in Matal v. Tam related to "disparaging" trademarks in that outside of the area of trademarks, such language remains unrestricted as private speech but not government speech.

== Supreme Court ==
The Patent and Trademark Office, under its director Andrei Iancu, filed for writ of certiorari to the Supreme Court, which agreed to hear the case, with oral arguments heard on April 15, 2019. Observers believed that the majority of the Justices would favor Brunetti's case and strike out trademark restrictions on "immoral" or "scandalous" material in part because past inconsistency in the Office's application of the law by having past approved trademarks on "FCUK" and "FUBAR".

The Justices raised the question of whether the implied word from "Fuct" would be considered scandalous to the clothing line's target audience of young adults, but also brought concerns that then the word would appear in advertising, which people outside of this demographic may consider inappropriate speech. The Court expressed caution that others may follow suit with trademarking near matches to other well-established vulgar words and that it should be up to Congress to define a more exacting line, which otherwise does not violate the First Amendment.

The Court issued its decision on June 24, 2019 that affirmed the decision of the Federal Circuit Court. The majority opinion was written by Justice Elena Kagan, joined by Justices Thomas, Ginsburg, Alito, Gorsuch, and Kavanaugh. Kagan wrote that as the Court had found in Matal v. Tam, the Office would need to engage in and has engaged in "viewpoint discrimination" to determine if trademark requests were on the vague definitions of "immoral" or "scandalous". With the Office as a government entity, that would be a violation of First Amendment rights and it was thus decided that the portion of the Lanham Act was unconstitutional.

Justice Samuel Alito wrote a concurring opinion, pointing out that the Court had to make this decision because of the vagueness of the "immoral" and "scandalous" terms in the law, but Congress is empowered to create law that would make a more narrow determination that removed the viewpoint discrimination concern for the Office.

Separate opinions, each dissenting in part with the majority, were written by Chief Justice John Roberts and Justices Stephen Breyer and Sonia Sotomayor. The three generally felt that interpreting the "immoral" aspect of the Lanham Act was difficult and thus agreed with the majority in striking that portion of the law. However all three felt the "scandalous" interpretation was not as vague as majority opinion suggested and that the Office would not be engaging in viewpoint discrimination through that action. The three, along with Alito in his concurring opinion, expressed concern that this decision will lead to a flood of new trademarks that would be considered crude and the creation of public spaces that would be repugnant to some people.
