= Organically Grown (Delaware company) =

American clothing company

Organically Grown is a privately held Delaware limited liability company owned by Organically Grown Group LLC, with offices in Encino, California. Julia and Robert Stein founded the company in October 2007. The brands owned and controlled by Organically Grown Group LLC include: Organically Grown, Organically Grown Baby and Organically Grown Kids.

== History ==
The Organically Grown brand was first established in 1971 by Arpeja-California, Inc., a women's apparel manufacturer in Los Angeles whose labels included Young Innocent, Young Victorian, and Young Edwardian, where designer Sue Wong cut her teeth, and created by Arpeja owner Jack Litt. At one point, Organically Grown was reported to have annual sales of nearly $100 million. Lynda Carter, star of the 1970s hit television show, "The New Adventures of Wonder Woman", served as a spokesperson and modeled for advertisements for the brand in 1977 and 1978.

In 1992, Organically Grown's trademarks were sold by Arpeja-California, Inc. to Marshalls of MA., Inc. (discount department stores) which was then acquired by The TJX Companies Inc. (TJ Maxx) in 1995. In October 2007, Organically Grown Group, LLC acquired all rights owned by The TJX Companies, Inc. and Marshalls of MA., Inc. in the Organically Grown trademarks.

In 2007, Julia and Robert Stein co-founded Organically Grown as a lifestyle brand that brings organic products to the global marketplace.

== Products ==
Organically Grown provides 100 percent certified-organic cotton products that are available to purchase through the company's website and other retail outlets. After beginning with baby clothes and bedding, Organically Grown added adult T-shirts and headwear, as well as women's activewear to their collection of products.

All Organically Grown's products comply with regulations set forth by either the Global Organic Textile Standard, which is the leading processing standard for textiles made from organic fibres or the Organic Exchange 100 Standard, a standard for tracking and documenting the purchase, handling and use of 100 percent certified organic cotton fiber in yarns, fabrics and finished goods.

== Business operations and philosophy ==
After hearing of the dangers conventional cotton poses on individual health and the environment, the husband and wife team of Julia and Robert Stein decided to get involved. According to a report from the Organic Exchange, in 2008 the production of conventional cotton used over 284 million pounds of pesticides in the United States alone, with hundreds of millions more pounds sprayed worldwide. Additionally, seven of the ten pesticides most commonly sprayed on cotton are on the EPA's list of known, probable, or likely human carcinogens. The Steins realized that the market for organic clothing was not priced for the average everyday consumer. With Julia's background in merchandising and Robert's licensing and business law experience, the couple saw an opportunity to use their respective business backgrounds to start an affordably-priced organic clothing brand.
