= Teddy Andreadis =

American musician

Teddy 'Zig Zag' Andreadis (born circa 1962) is an American keyboardist, harmonica player and vocalist, who has worked with many popular musicians, including Carole King, Guns N' Roses, Chuck Berry, Bo Diddley, Alice Cooper, Bruce Willis, and the Boxing Gandhis. He currently lives in Los Angeles with his wife, author Lisa Goich.

== Recordings ==
Andreadis performed vocals, organ, piano, synthesizer and harmonica on three albums with Carole King, and has appeared on her 1994 live album In Concert. He has also played keyboards on the Boneshakers' latest release.

He has also contributed to the work of former Guns N' Roses members, including It's Five O'Clock Somewhere by Slash's Snakepit, and the 2001 album Rock & Roll Music, by the band Col. Parker, which features former Guns N' Roses member Gilby Clarke.

In 2007, Andreadis appeared on the album Dopesnake, by Hollywood Roses, a Guns N' Roses tribute band, which includes such artists as Gilby Clarke, Mick Taylor, Pat Travers and Tracii Guns.

In 2007 he also contributed keyboard work to Billy Bob Thornton's album Beautiful Door. Andreadis returned to working with Slash in 2024, appearing on his album Orgy of the Damned as a keyboardist and joining the subsequent tour alongside Slash and Tash Neal, providing keyboards and additional vocals.

== Video, film and television ==
Andreadis' video work includes: Michael Jackson's "Give In to Me"; Guns N' Roses' "November Rain", "Yesterdays", "Garden of Eden" and "Estranged"; Carole King's In Concert; and Alice Cooper's "Brutal Planet" and "Dragontown".

Andreadis' work can also be heard on many film soundtracks, including Keenen Ivory Wayans' I'm Gonna Git You Sucka, the United Artists release, Tapeheads, and the M.P.C.A. film Breakfast with Einstein.

He appeared on the soundtrack to "Me and Will" with Guns N' Roses' drummer, Matt Sorum, Izzy Stradlin and the Ju Ju Hounds' bassist, Jimmy Ashhurst, Mick Jagger's guitarist, Jimmy Ripp, and Wild Colonials' guitarist, score composer, Shark.

He played keyboard for Velvet Revolver and Ziggy Marley's cover of Pink Floyd's "Money", which they recorded for use on the soundtrack for the 2003 film Italian Job.

His TV credits include a recurring role on Full House, Late Night with David Letterman, The Tonight Show with Jay Leno, the MTV Video Music Awards with Guns N' Roses, and NBC's Three Sisters. He has done commercial voice-over work for McDonald's (with B.B. King), Kellogg's and Toyota. Andreadis also wrote and performed the theme song for the Disney Channel's The Z Games. He once appeared on an episode of Trading Spaces.

== Live appearances ==
Over the past two decades, Andreadis has toured with The Guess Who, Slash, Walter Trout, Carole King, Alice Cooper, Beth Hart, Bruce Willis, Peter Stormare, Jeff "Skunk" Baxter, the Boxing Gandhis, Gilby Clarke, and Duff McKagan.

He toured with Guns N' Roses on their Use Your Illusion Tour between 1991 and 1993, appearing on the Use Your Illusion I and II live videos filmed in Tokyo, Japan, in 1992.

In 1996, Andreadis joined Slash's band Blues Ball, touring live with them; in 1999, when Slash reformed his prior band Slash's Snakepit, Andreadis joined them as well, providing keyboard and harmonica work.

In 2008, he joined the tour of Billy Bob Thornton's band The Boxmasters, as keyboard player.

He conducted a popular weekly jam session in Hollywood at the Baked Potato with his band The Screaming Cocktail Hour. The blues-based jam regularly attracted such names as Steve Winwood, Joe Sample, Patrick Moraz, Steve Lukather, Mike Landau, John Stamos, Matt Sorum, Gilby Clarke, Jason Bonham, Glenn Hughes, Carole King, Drew Barrymore, Keanu Reeves, Howard Leese, Joe Lynn Turner, Bob Daisley, Ace Frehley, Eric Singer, Randy Castillo and Mike Inez.

In February, 2015, Teddy was a "counselor" at Rock and Roll Fantasy Camp in Las Vegas, Nevada.

In November 2026, he reunited with Guns N' Roses onstage at the Hollywood Bowl to play harmonica during the Aerosmith & Friends concert.

== Solo album ==
In 1996, Andreadis released a solo album, Innocent Loser. Among those featured on the album are Guns N' Roses band members Slash, Duff McKagan and Matt Sorum, drummers Greg Bissonette and Pat Torpey, guitarist Steve Lukather, and Carole King. The album includes the ballad "Ragman", and "Shotgun Shack", which focuses on social issues. The album also features guitarist, producer and writer, Lanny Cordola, arranging and playing an array of exotic instruments,

Andreadis says of his album, "We were going for a Little Feat vibe, New Orleans kind of stuff. You know, Dr. John, some Stones…Americana rock. But we're trying to keep it heavy, so that when you play it, it's something that hits you from the beginning and makes you want to stick around 'til the end."
