= It's Five O'Clock Somewhere (album) =

Studio album by Slash's Snakepit
- Released: February 14, 1995
- Recorded: 1994
- Studio: Conway, Record Plant and Rumbo Recorders
- Genre: Hard rock, blues rock, southern rock
- Length: 69:40
- Label: Geffen
- Producer: Mike Clink, Slash

Slash's Snakepit chronology
It's Five O'Clock Somewhere (1995)	Ain't Life Grand (2000)

Singles from It's Five O'Clock Somewhere
- 1. "Beggars and Hangers-on" Released: February 1995; 2. "Good to Be Alive" Released: June 1995

Professional ratings
Review scores
Source	Rating
AllMusic	4.5/5 stars
Entertainment Weekly	A−
Rolling Stone	4/5 stars

It's Five O'Clock Somewhere is the debut studio album by American hard rock band Slash's Snakepit, released in February 1995. The album was a moderate commercial success, reaching number 70 on the American Billboard 200 album chart and selling over a million copies worldwide. The songs "Beggars & Hangers-On" and "Good to Be Alive" were released as singles and promo videos were made for each track.

The album was recorded as Guns N' Roses, Slash's main group at the time, were struggling to come to agreement on musical style on their next album. Slash's Guns N' Roses bandmates Matt Sorum, Dizzy Reed, Gilby Clarke as well as associate Teddy Andreadis all contributed to the album. Sorum stated that it "could have been a Guns N' Roses album, but [lead singer] Axl [Rose] didn't think it was good enough".

== Track listing ==
No.	Title	Writer(s)	Length
1.	"Neither Can I"	Slash, Eric Dover	6:44
2.	"Dime Store Rock"	Gilby Clarke, Slash, Dover	4:54
3.	"Beggars & Hangers-On"	Slash, Dover, Duff McKagan	6:15
4.	"Good to Be Alive"	Slash, Clarke, Dover	4:51
5.	"What Do You Want to Be"	Slash, Matt Sorum, Dover	6:17
6.	"Monkey Chow"	Clarke	4:12
7.	"Soma City Ward"	Slash, Sorum, Dover	3:50
8.	"Jizz da Pit" (instrumental)	Slash, Mike Inez	2:48
9.	"Lower"	Slash, Sorum, Dover	4:55
10.	"Take It Away"	Slash, Dover, Sorum	4:44
11.	"Doin' Fine"	Slash, Dover	4:17
12.	"Be the Ball"	Slash	5:16
13.	"I Hate Everybody (But You)"	Slash, Dover	4:41
14.	"Back and Forth Again"	Slash, Dover	5:56
Total length:			69:40

== Personnel ==
Slash's Snakepit

- Slash – lead and rhythm guitars, slide guitar, talkbox, backing vocals, production
- Eric Dover – lead vocals
- Gilby Clarke – rhythm guitar, backing vocals
- Mike Inez – bass, backing vocals
- Matt Sorum – drums, backing vocals

Additional personnel

- Dizzy Reed – keyboards, backing vocals
- Teddy Andreadis – harmonica
- Paulinho da Costa – percussion

Technical personnel

- Mike Clink – production, engineering
- Steve Thompson – mixing
- Michael Barbiero – mixing
- Jerry Finn – engineering
- John Radzin – engineering
- Rick Raponi – engineering
- Robbes Steiglitz – engineering
- Shawn Berman – engineering
- Jay Ryan – additional engineering
- Noel Golden – additional engineering
- George Marino – mastering

== Charts ==
Chart performance for It's Five O'Clock Somewhere
Chart (1995)	Peak position
Australian Albums (ARIA)	26
Austrian Albums (Ö3 Austria)	15
Belgian Albums (Ultratop Wallonia)	50
Dutch Albums (Album Top 100)	19
German Albums (Offizielle Top 100)	19
Hungarian Albums (MAHASZ)	32
Norwegian Albums (VG-lista)	27
Swedish Albums (Sverigetopplistan)	11
Swiss Albums (Schweizer Hitparade)	15
UK Albums (OCC)	15

== Certifications ==
Certifications for It's Five O'Clock Somewhere
Region	Certification	Certified units/sales
Japan (RIAJ)	Gold	100,000^{^}
^{^} Shipments figures based on certification alone.
