= Sue Wong =

Chinese-born American fashion designer

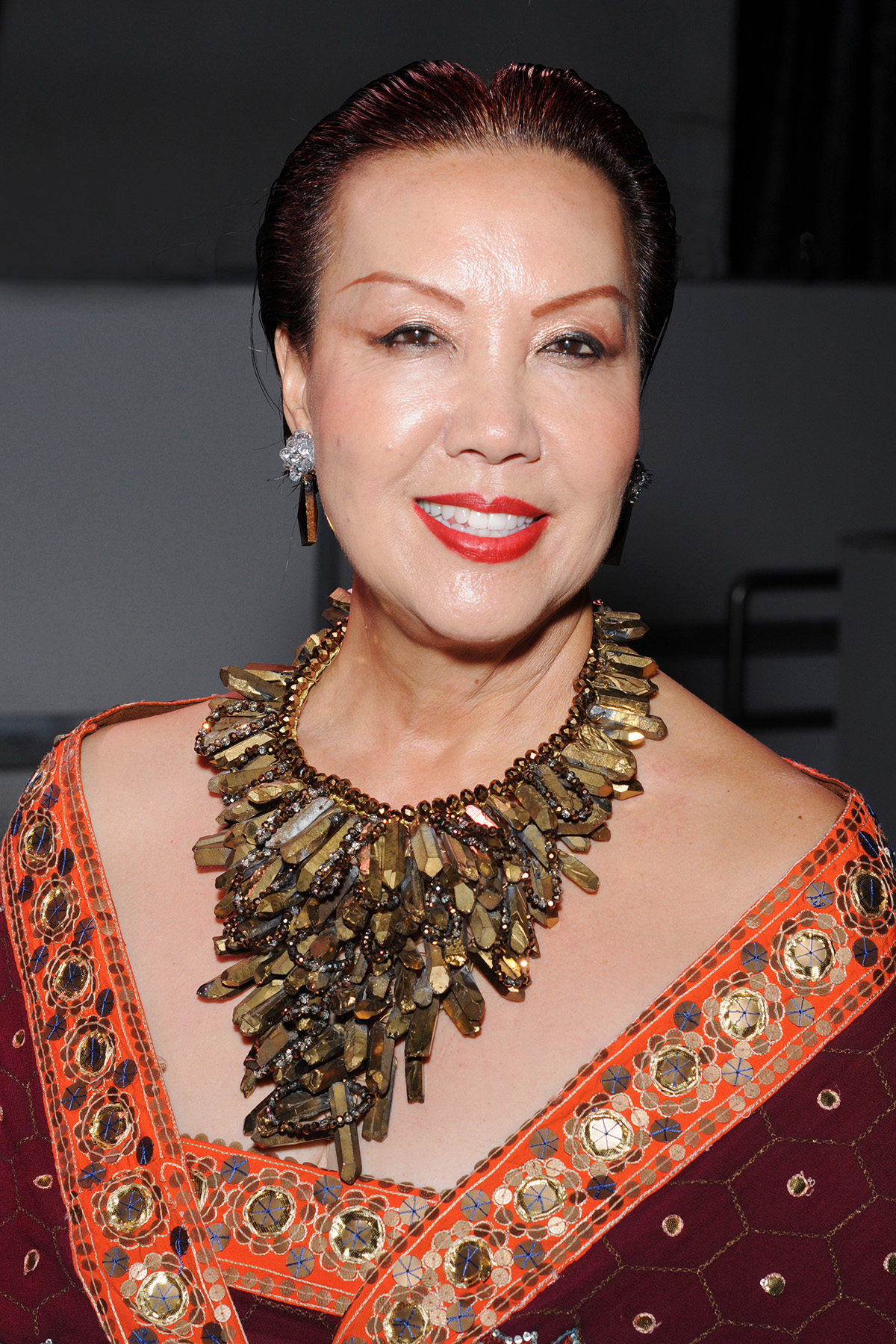
- Wong, Hollywood, California on April 30, 2014
- Born: China
- Education: Los Angeles Technical Trade School
- Occupation: Fashion designer
- Style: Old Hollywood glamour
- Spouse: Ralph Homann (divorced)

Sue Wong is a Chinese-born American fashion designer best known for her dress designs with a contemporary twist based on old Hollywood glamour style. Her collections, available in some 27 countries, have been noted for her interpretations of the traditions of couture dressmaking of romantic eras such as Weimar Berlin, 1930s Shanghai, pre-code Hollywood, and Manhattan’s gilded Jazz Age. She owns Sue Wong Universe, based in Los Angeles, California.

== Early life ==
Sue Wong was born in the remote countryside of southern China. At age five, her mother bribed a border guard with her wedding jewels to allow their escape from Communist China into Hong Kong. A year later, they reached Los Angeles, where they united with Wong's father who had moved to the United States from China before she was born.

When she was nine years old, Wong made her first blouse with her mom's Singer sewing machine from a scrap of fabric and some lace. In junior high and high school, Wong designed and sewed herself a dress for each weekly dance of the school year. Her senior prom dress was her own creation as well, adorned with beads handsewn into the bodice.

== Career ==
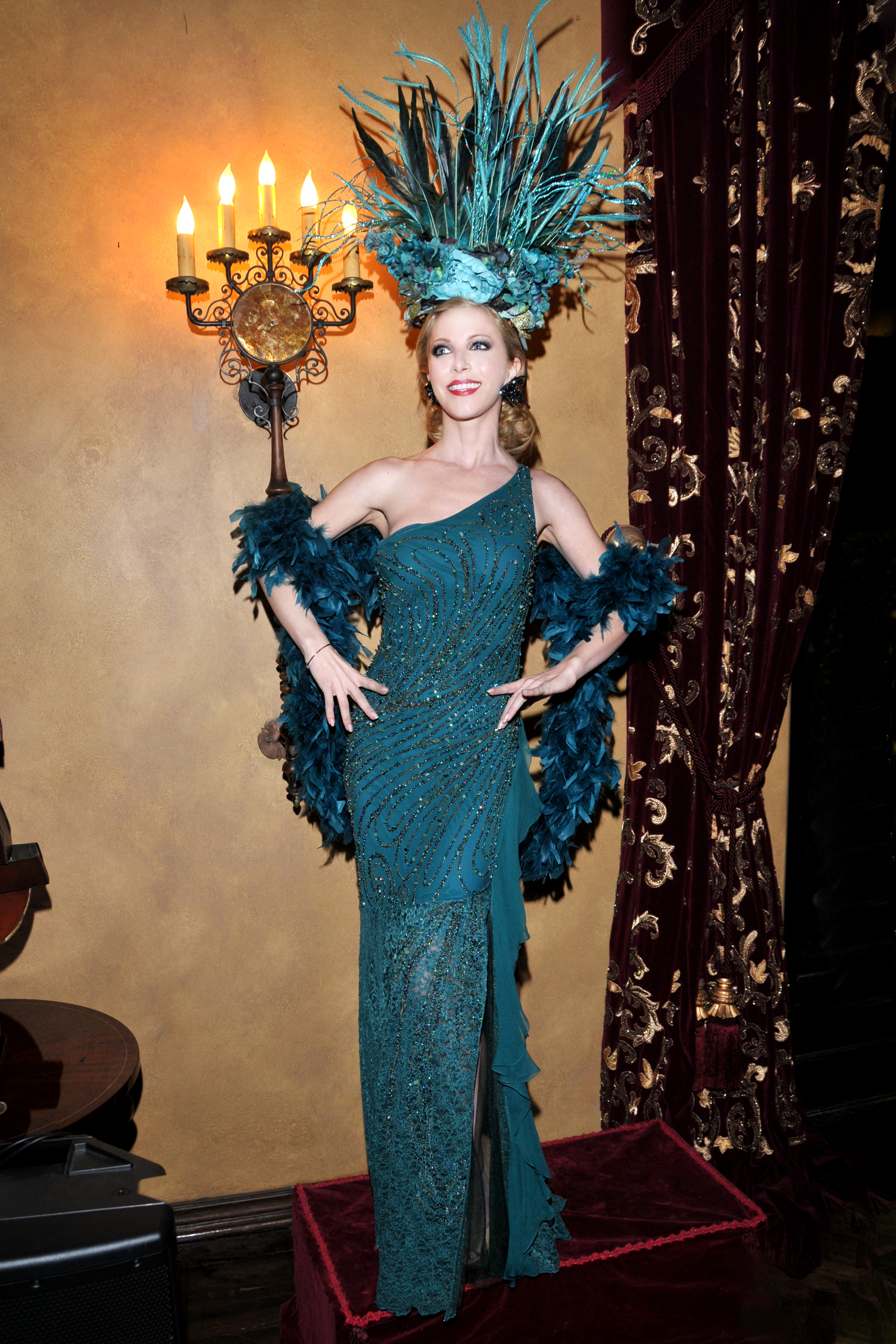
Podium model modelling a dress designed by Wong

Wong became an intern at Arpeja, a popular fashion-design label in the 1960s and '70s. After a brief and failed attempt in 1970 to operate a boutique with her best friend in 1970, she returned to Arpeja in 1976 to become head designer of its Young Edwardian line. By 1977, she had taken the company's sales from $5US million to $50US million.

In 1979, Wong again attempted to establish her own business but was unsuccessful. She finally found success when she founded her own clothing line in 1984. In 1999, she created Sue Wong Nocturne, an evening wear line. Her clothing has been worn by Taylor Swift, Miley Cyrus, Anne Hathaway, Jessica Biel, Vanessa Minnillo, Kelly Osbourne, Tyra Banks, and other celebrities.

== Personal life ==
In her early 20s, Wong married artist and textile designer Ralph Homann and had two sons. After six and a half years of marriage, Homann and Wong divorced, and she has remained unmarried. In 2004, Wong bought The Cedars, a hilltop villa in Los Feliz, originally built in 1926 for French film director and screenwriter Maurice Tourneur. She spent two years restoring the mansion to its intended 1920s state. She has a collection of over 200 paintings and sculptures.
