= Erik Brunetti =

American artist

- Born: May 5, 1967 (age 59); Phillipsburg, New Jersey
- Occupations: artist, designer, director, curator, founder of clothing/lifestyle brand FUCT
- Years active: 1984–present
- Spouse: Emmelie Brunetti
- Website: Official website

Erik Brunetti (born 5 May 1967) is an American artist, designer, director and founder of the lifestyle and clothing brand FUCT (alongside professional skateboarder Natas Kaupas).

== Biography ==
Erik Brunetti was born in Phillipsburg, New Jersey, May 5, 1967. He is of German-Italian descent. He first started writing graffiti in the mid-1980s as DEN ONE.

Brunetti's installation "Lost" was first exhibited in 1996 at OK Harris Gallery in New York City. It was part of a solo exhibition, titled Adaption from lost animal poster flyers. Brunetti also exhibited his work in a 1998 group show titled Channel 3 at Team Gallery in New York alongside Tracey Emin, Jaime Levy and Pedro Ortuno.

Brunetti was invited to re-create this piece as part the 2011 MOCA Los Angeles Art In The Streets exhibitionby curators Jeffrey Deitch and Aaron Rose.

His first feature directorial work was The Doctrine, a series of short movies used as commercials for his brand FUCT, which he directed, produced and scored. "The Doctrine, part II" features Esther De Jong.

Brunetti has been known for candidly discussing his intellectual and political views. His most recent interviews depict his criticism of the foreign policy of the United States and other governments.

=== FUCT ===
In 1990, Brunetti launched his brand clothing brand FUCT, standing for "Friends U Can’t Trust." He repeatedly tried trademarking his brand but was unable to do so due to the U.S. government Patent and Trademark Office citing the Lanham Act, a federal statute that bars trademark protection for words that are deemed "scandalous." In June 2019, the Supreme Court struck down the ban in the court case Iancu v. Brunetti, paving the way for a trademark.

=== Record production ===
Brunetti played in the band Lucifer Wong with guitarist Patrick Sugg, bassist Steve Hanson, guitarist Antonio Ortiz and Drummer Stevie DRT. Brunetti produced the 2004 LP by garage rock band The Superbees under his record label, Sonic Fever Records.

== Exhibitions ==
- Adaption From Lost Animal Poster Flyers (OK Harris Gallery, 1996)
- Substitute Teenager (Merry Karnowsky Gallery, 1997)
- Channel 3 (Team Gallery, 1998)
- Art In The Streets (MOCA Los Angeles, 2011)
- Erik Brunetti & Jesse Edwards (Vito Schnabel Gallery, 2014)
