= Shawn Mortensen =

American photographer and photojournalist (born 1965)

Shawn Mortensen (November 14, 1965—April 15, 2009) was an American art photographer and photojournalist. He was famous for his characteristic, and often-imitated, style.

His subjects included Keith Haring, the Beastie Boys, Biggie Smalls, Kate Moss, and the Sex Pistols.
