= Gary Warnett =

British writer and consultant in sneaker and streetwear culture

- Born: 1978
- Died: 26 September 2017 (aged 38–39)
- Occupations: Writer, consultant, cultural historian
- Known for: Sneaker and streetwear culture journalism, blog "Gwarizm"

Gary Warnett (1978 – 26 September 2017) was a British writer, consultant, and cultural historian known for his influence on sneaker and streetwear journalism. Best known for his blog Gwarizm, he contributed to outlets including Crooked Tongues, Hypebeast, Nice Kicks, Complex, and Sneaker Freaker, and worked closely with brands such as Nike, Reebok, adidas, and Supreme.

Warnett was recognized for his deep archival knowledge and influential voice in sneaker culture. His writing combined product detail with broader cultural context, and he was often consulted by global brands.

== Tributes ==
After his death, multiple brands released commemorative products honoring Warnett. Reebok issued special editions of the Classic Leather and Workout Ripple Low, Nike released an Air Span II marked “GW”, and adidas and Supreme also paid tribute.

== Bibliography ==
Gary Warnett contributed to the following books:

- The Carhartt WIP Archives, Carhartt, 2014. ISBN 9783941489099
- FUCT, Rizzoli, 2013. ISBN 9780847849863
- Caps: One Size Fits All, Gestalten, 2012. ISBN 9783899554351
