= Matt Laug =

American drummer (born 1968)

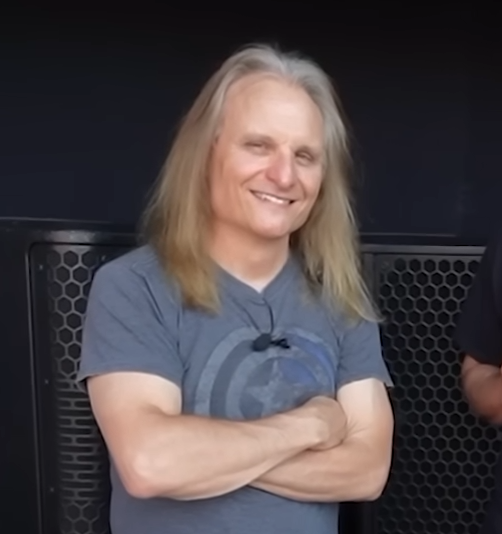
- Laug in 2025

Background information
- Born: March 17, 1968 (age 58)
- Origin: Florence, South Carolina, United States
- Instruments: Drums; vocals
- Years active: 1986–present
- Member of: AC/DC
- Formerly of: Alanis Morissette; Alice Cooper; Autograph; Slash's Snakepit; The Dirty Knobs; Vasco Rossi

Matt Laug (born March 17, 1968) is an American drummer who has played with many bands/artists such as AC/DC, Alanis Morissette, Alice Cooper, Slash's Snakepit and Vasco Rossi.

Laug moved to Los Angeles after graduating from South Florence High School in 1986, and after attending college in LA, Laug became a sought-after studio drummer. Along with a long list of many other rock artists, Laug played drums on Alanis Morissette's June 1995 album, Jagged Little Pill, which sold over 16 million copies and was the number one album on the US Billboard 200 for the decade 1990–1999.

He also played drums as a part of Steve Plunkett's reformed Autograph line-up from 2002 to 2005.

In 2005, Laug joined Mike Campbell of Tom Petty and the Heartbreakers in his side band known as The Dirty Knobs, and the band since has played occasional shows for the next 15 years in between Heartbreakers shows in Los Angeles. After the death of Tom Petty in 2017 effectively ending the Heartbreakers and following Campbell's world tour with Fleetwood Mac, the band released its debut album Wreckless Abandon on March 20.

On October 7, 2023, he performed at the Power Trip Festival at the Empire Polo Club in Indio, California together with AC/DC. He continued to play with AC/DC for their 2024 European Power Up Tour dates. Laug also played with the band through their 2026 tour dates in North and South America.
