= The Art of Letting Go (album) =

Studio album by Myles Kennedy
- Released: October 11, 2024
- Studio: Studio Barbarosa (Orlando, Florida)
- Length: 46:22
- Label: Napalm
- Producer: Michael Baskette

Myles Kennedy chronology
Pawns & Kings (2022)	The Art of Letting Go (2024)	Alter Bridge (2026)

Singles from The Art of Letting Go
- 1. "Say What You Will" Released: June 11, 2024; 2. "Nothing More to Gain" Released: July 30, 2024; 3. "Miss You When You're Gone" Released: September 13, 2024; 4. "Saving Face" Released: October 9, 2024

The Art of Letting Go is the third studio album by American songwriter and Alter Bridge lead singer Myles Kennedy. It is the follow-up to 2021's The Ides of March. It was released on October 11, 2024, via Napalm Records.

== Background ==
On June 10, 2024, Myles Kennedy announced his third solo album, further divulging that the project begins with riff-heavy songs, and closes in a haunting fashion.

In an interview, Kennedy discussed the difference between releasing a solo album compared to his work with Slash and Alter Bridge, and explained that there are a ton of songs and ideas that he would like to express that simply wouldn't work in other realms.

== Track listing ==
All tracks are written by Myles Kennedy.

The Art of Letting Go track listing
No.	Title	Length
1.	"The Art of Letting Go"	4:38
2.	"Say What You Will"	3:33
3.	"Mr. Downside"	4:17
4.	"Miss You When You're Gone"	4:10
5.	"Behind the Veil"	5:48
6.	"Saving Face"	4:10
7.	"Eternal Lullaby"	5:24
8.	"Nothing More to Gain"	5:04
9.	"Dead to Rights"	4:19
10.	"How the Story Ends"	4:59
Total length:		46:22

== Personnel ==
- Myles Kennedy – vocals, guitar
- Zia Uddin – drums, percussion
- Tim Tournier – bass guitar
- Michael "Elvis" Baskette – producer, mixing
- Jef Moll – engineering, digital editing
- Brad Blackwood – mastering

== Charts ==
Chart performance for The Art of Letting Go
Chart (2024)	Peak position
Austrian Albums (Ö3 Austria)	10
Belgian Albums (Ultratop Flanders)	195
French Rock & Metal Albums (SNEP)	23
German Albums (Offizielle Top 100)	36
Scottish Albums (OCC)	9
Swiss Albums (Schweizer Hitparade)	20
UK Albums (OCC)	98
UK Independent Albums (OCC)	2
UK Rock & Metal Albums (OCC)	2
US Top Album Sales (Billboard)	10
US Top Hard Rock Albums (Billboard)	16
US Independent Albums (Billboard)	41
