= 4 (Slash album) =

Studio album by Slash featuring Myles Kennedy and the Conspirators
- Released: February 11, 2022
- Recorded: 2021
- Studios: RCA Studio A (Nashville, Tennessee)
- Length: 43:35
- Label: Gibson
- Producer: Dave Cobb

Slash chronology
Living the Dream Tour (2019)	4 (2022)	Orgy of the Damned (2024)

Myles Kennedy chronology
The Ides of March (2021)	4 (2022)	Pawns & Kings (2022)

Singles from 4
- 1. "The River Is Rising" Released: October 22, 2021; 2. "Fill My World" Released: December 2, 2021; 3. "Call off the Dogs" Released: January 14, 2022

4 is the fourth studio album by Slash featuring Myles Kennedy and the Conspirators, and Slash's fifth solo album overall. It was released on February 11, 2022, as the first album from the new Gibson Records label. The album was produced by country producer Dave Cobb in Nashville. The album was announced on October 20, 2021, with the release of the first track "The River Is Rising" as a single.

== Background ==
Though Slash reunited with Guns N' Roses in 2016, he has still continued with his solo work, this being the second studio album release in that time period. Writing for the album started during the 2018–19 Living the Dream Tour. Slash stated of the album, "There's two or three songs on the record that were written during the pandemic; everything else was written before".

Looking to record the album in a different style than previously, the band travelled to Nashville to record at RCA Studio A with Dave Cobb. Cobb shared the band's vision of recording the tracks live together, a tactic they had not employed on the previous albums. Slash noted that "we did it more or less live, and the mistakes are all in there. It's the sound of the five of us just jamming together in one room."

The band faced the complications of COVID-19 not only in a delay of getting together to record the album, but also with the recording itself. Myles Kennedy was the first of several band members to contract the virus. He points out that you can hear his congestion on the opening track but states that these anomalies make the album interesting because "We just let those imperfections lay."

== Accolades ==
Publication	List
Metal Hammer	The Best Metal Albums of 2022 So Far
Guitar World	The 10 Best Guitar Solos of 2022 (for "Fill My World"; ranked #8)
Guitar World	The Best Guitar Albums of 2022 (ranked #15)

== Track listing ==
All tracks are written by Slash and Myles Kennedy.

4 track listing
No.	Title	Length
1.	"The River Is Rising"	3:42
2.	"Whatever Gets You By"	3:40
3.	"C'est La Vie"	4:38
4.	"The Path Less Followed"	3:40
5.	"Actions Speak Louder Than Words"	4:01
6.	"Spirit Love"	4:15
7.	"Fill My World"	5:28
8.	"April Fool"	4:33
9.	"Call off the Dogs"	3:15
10.	"Fall Back to Earth"	6:23
Total length:		43:35

Japanese edition bonus tracks
No.	Title	Length
11.	"You're a Lie" (Live at Studio 60)	3:44
12.	"World on Fire" (Live at Studio 60)	5:37
13.	"Driving Rain" (Live at Studio 60)	4:17
14.	"Anastasia" (Live at Studio 60)	7:31
Total length:		64:52

Japan Deluxe Edition bonus DVD
No.	Title	Length
1.	"The River Is Rising" (Live at Studio 60)	3:42
2.	"Whatever Gets You By" (Live at Studio 60)	3:40
3.	"C'est La Vie" (Live at Studio 60)	4:38
4.	"The Path Less Followed" (Live at Studio 60)	3:40
5.	"Actions Speak Louder Than Words" (Live at Studio 60)	4:01
6.	"Spirit Love" (Live at Studio 60)	4:15
7.	"Fill My World" (Live at Studio 60)	5:28
8.	"April Fool" (Live at Studio 60)	4:33
9.	"Call off the Dogs" (Live at Studio 60)	3:15
10.	"Fall Back to Earth" (Live at Studio 60)	6:23
11.	"You're a Lie" (Live at Studio 60)	3:43
12.	"World on Fire" (Live at Studio 60)	5:35
13.	"Driving Rain" (Live at Studio 60)	4:16
14.	"Anastasia" (Live at Studio 60)	7:30
Total length:		66:00

== Personnel ==
Slash featuring Myles Kennedy and the Conspirators

- Slash – lead guitar, talkbox on "C'est La Vie"
- Myles Kennedy – lead vocals
- Todd Kerns – bass, backing vocals
- Brent Fitz – drums, percussion, electric piano
- Frank Sidoris – rhythm guitar

Additional personnel

- Dave Cobb – producer, mixing
- Ted Jensen – mastering
- Eddie "Baby Faders" Spear – engineer
- Phillip "Sweet Man" Smith – second engineer
- John Ewing – pre-production engineer
- Craig Defalco – guitar technician
- Andrew Brightman – production coordination
- Frank Maddocks – art direction, design
- Austin Nelson – photography

== Charts ==
Chart performance for 4
Chart (2022)	Peak position
Australian Albums (ARIA)	2
Austrian Albums (Ö3 Austria)	4
Belgian Albums (Ultratop Flanders)	23
Belgian Albums (Ultratop Wallonia)	8
Canadian Albums (Billboard)	67
Dutch Albums (Album Top 100)	11
Finnish Albums (Suomen virallinen lista)	11
French Albums (SNEP)	18
German Albums (Offizielle Top 100)	4
Hungarian Albums (MAHASZ)	15
Irish Albums (Official Charts)	29
Italian Albums (FIMI)	15
Japanese Albums (Oricon)	46
Japanese Hot Albums (Billboard Japan)	61
New Zealand Albums (RMNZ)	20
Polish Albums (ZPAV)	8
Portuguese Albums (AFP)	6
Swedish Albums (Sverigetopplistan)	9
Scottish Albums (Official Charts)	3
Spanish Albums (Promusicae)	10
Swiss Albums (Schweizer Hitparade)	2
UK Albums (Official Charts)	5
UK Independent Albums (Official Charts)	2
UK Rock & Metal Albums (Official Charts)	1
US Billboard 200	93
US Independent Albums (Billboard)	11
US Top Rock Albums (Billboard)	13
