= Motion (EP) =

EP by The Mayfield Four
- Released: November 17, 1997
- Recorded: September 17, 1997
- Venue: Outback Jack's (Spokane, Washington)
- Genre: Alternative rock; indie rock
- Length: 16:50
- Label: Epic
- Producer: Jerry Harrison

The Mayfield Four chronology
Thirty Two Point Five Hours (1996)	Motion (1997)	Fallout (1998)

Myles Kennedy chronology
Thirty Two Point Five Hours (1996)	Motion (1997)	Fallout (1998)

Motion: Live: 9.17.97, commonly referred to as Motion, is a live EP released by The Mayfield Four, released in 1997. It is a very rare item and is a highly sought after collector's item among fans. Former Mayfield Four vocalist Myles Kennedy has stated that "only about 5,000 copies were ever made".

The album does not have a bar code, due to the fact that it was only sold at the band's concerts.

== Album cover ==
The building on the front of the album is the Suki-Yaki inn, a small Japanese restaurant from downtown Spokane. The band was known for hanging out there a lot when they were younger. The inn is a couple of blocks away from Outback Jack's, where the album was recorded.

== Track listing ==
All tracks are written by Myles Kennedy, except where noted.

No.	Title	Writer(s)	Length
1.	"Fallout"		5:31
2.	"10K"		2:33
3.	"No One Nothing"		3:42
4.	"Inner City Blues (Make Me Wanna Holler)"	Marvin Gaye; James Nyx Jr.	5:04
Total length:			16:50

The song "10K" was also featured on the Japanese import version of Fallout.

== Personnel ==
The Mayfield Four

- Myles Kennedy – vocals, guitar
- Craig Johnson – guitar
- Zia Uddin – drums
- Marty Meisner – bass guitar

Additional personnel

- Jerry Harrison – producer
- Karl Derfler – engineer
