= The Ides of March (album) =

Studio album by Myles Kennedy
- Released: May 14, 2021
- Studio: Studio Barbarosa (Orlando, Florida)
- Length: 51:29
- Label: Napalm
- Producer: Michael "Elvis" Baskette

Myles Kennedy chronology
Walk the Sky (2019)	The Ides of March (2021)	4 (2022)

Professional ratings
Review scores
Source	Rating
Blabbermouth	7/10
Classic Rock	4.5/5 stars
Distorted Sound	7/10
Kerrang!	3/5 stars
Metal Hammer	3/5 stars
Riff Magazine	9/10
Sonic Perspectives	8.5/10

The Ides of March is the second solo album by American singer and guitarist Myles Kennedy. It was released on May 14, 2021 via Napalm Records. In an interview with Kylie Olsson, Kennedy stated that he was listening to this record and told himself that he basically just made a "rock" record but only adding elements from his previous solo effort like acoustic guitar and lap steel guitar.

It was chosen by Loudwire as the 29th best rock/metal album of 2021.

== Background ==
In an interview with Loudwire, Myles explained the meaning behind every track of the record and its story behind it. For the song "Get Along," it is basically about the 1992 Los Angeles riots and how the lyrics affected 2020. "A Thousand Words" is about his friend's father's mother and how she was standing in an old photograph. The song "In Stride" is about a survivalist preparing for an impending zombie apocalypse. The title song, "The Ides of March," is about warning and a bleak outlook to remind us who we are. "Wake Me When It's Over" is about Myles's alcohol addiction during the pandemic and how he was very bored during lockdown. The song "Love Rain Down" is about a desire for answers and unity in the world. "Tell It Like It Is" is about speaking your mind when you've had enough. The song "Moonshot" is about the eagerness to go back on tour with his bandmates. For the song "Wanderlust Begins," it is about the yearning to set out and start over from the beginning. "Sifting Through the Fire" is basically about getting the wrong information, whether it's from the news or social media. The final song on the album, "Worried Mind," is about the assurance that someone is willing to remain steadfast for something while calling on the need to compromise.

== Track listing ==
All tracks are written by Myles Kennedy.

The Ides of March track listing
No.	Title	Length
1.	"Get Along"	4:12
2.	"A Thousand Words"	3:41
3.	"In Stride"	3:47
4.	"The Ides of March"	7:39
5.	"Wake Me When It's Over"	4:44
6.	"Love Rain Down"	5:00
7.	"Tell It Like It Is"	4:16
8.	"Moonshot"	4:57
9.	"Wanderlust Begins"	4:06
10.	"Sifting Through the Fire"	4:26
11.	"Worried Mind"	4:41
Total length:		51:29

Bonus tracks
No.	Title	Length
12.	"The Ides of March" (demo)
13.	"Get Along" (demo)
14.	"A Thousand Words" (demo)

== Personnel ==
- Myles Kennedy – vocals, guitar, banjo, lap steel, bass guitar, mandolin
- Zia Uddin – drums, percussion
- Tim Tournier – bass guitar
- Michael "Elvis" Baskette – keyboards, producer, mixing
- Jef Moll – engineering, digital editing
- Brad Blackwood – mastering

== Charts ==
Chart performance for The Ides of March
Chart (2021)	Peak position
Austrian Albums (Ö3 Austria)	8
Belgian Albums (Ultratop Flanders)	106
Belgian Albums (Ultratop Wallonia)	132
Dutch Albums (Album Top 100)	57
German Albums (Offizielle Top 100)	9
Polish Albums (ZPAV)	36
Scottish Albums (OCC)	5
Swiss Albums (Schweizer Hitparade)	11
UK Albums (OCC)	20
UK Independent Albums (OCC)	1
UK Rock & Metal Albums (OCC)	1
US Billboard 200	170
US Independent Albums (Billboard)	26
US Top Hard Rock Albums (Billboard)	7
US Top Rock Albums (Billboard)	33
