= Second Skin (The Mayfield Four album) =

Studio album by The Mayfield Four
- Released: June 26, 2001
- Recorded: Autumn 2000
- Genre: Alternative rock; hard rock
- Length: 47:31
- Label: Sony
- Producer: Peter Collins

The Mayfield Four chronology
Fallout (1998)	Second Skin (2001)

Myles Kennedy chronology
Fallout (1998)	Second Skin (2001)	One Day Remains (2004)

Professional ratings
Review scores
Source	Rating
AllMusic	3/5 stars

Second Skin was the second and final album from American rock band, The Mayfield Four. Two singles were taken from the album: "Sick and Wrong" and "Eden (Turn the Page)". Singer Myles Kennedy has stated that "Sick and Wrong" and "Flatley's Crutch" are the only songs he has written that contain profanity. Lyrically, the album features topics of love, substance abuse, violence, and sex.

Second Skin is a departure from the band's first album, Fallout, which features a more soul-influenced sound, while Second Skin moved in the band in a more hard rock direction.

== Track listing ==
All tracks are written by Myles Kennedy.

No.	Title	Length
1.	"Sick & Wrong"	4:22
2.	"Loose Cannon"	3:57
3.	"Mars Hotel"	3:58
4.	"Lyla"	3:00
5.	"Eden (Turn The Page)"	3:55
6.	"High"	3:35
7.	"Carry On"	3:56
8.	"Backslide"	3:05
9.	"White Flag"	4:51
10.	"Flatley's Crutch"	3:34
11.	"Believe"	4:42
12.	"Summergirl"	4:45
Total length:		47:27

== Personnel ==
The Mayfield Four

- Myles Kennedy – vocals, guitars, arrangements
- Zia Uddin – drums, percussion, vocals, arrangements
- Marty Meisner – bass guitar, arrangements (2–10, 12)

Additional personnel

- Peter Collins – producer
- Michael "Elvis" Baskette – engineer
- Brandon Mason – assistant engineer
- Tom Lord-Alge – mixing
- Suzanne Ybarra – production coordinator for mixing
- Fernio Hernandez – second engineer
- Randy Pencil – guitar and amplifier technician
- Hooshik – art direction, design
- Olaf Heine – photography
- David Sanchez – piano (7)
