= Myles Kennedy =

American singer and guitarist

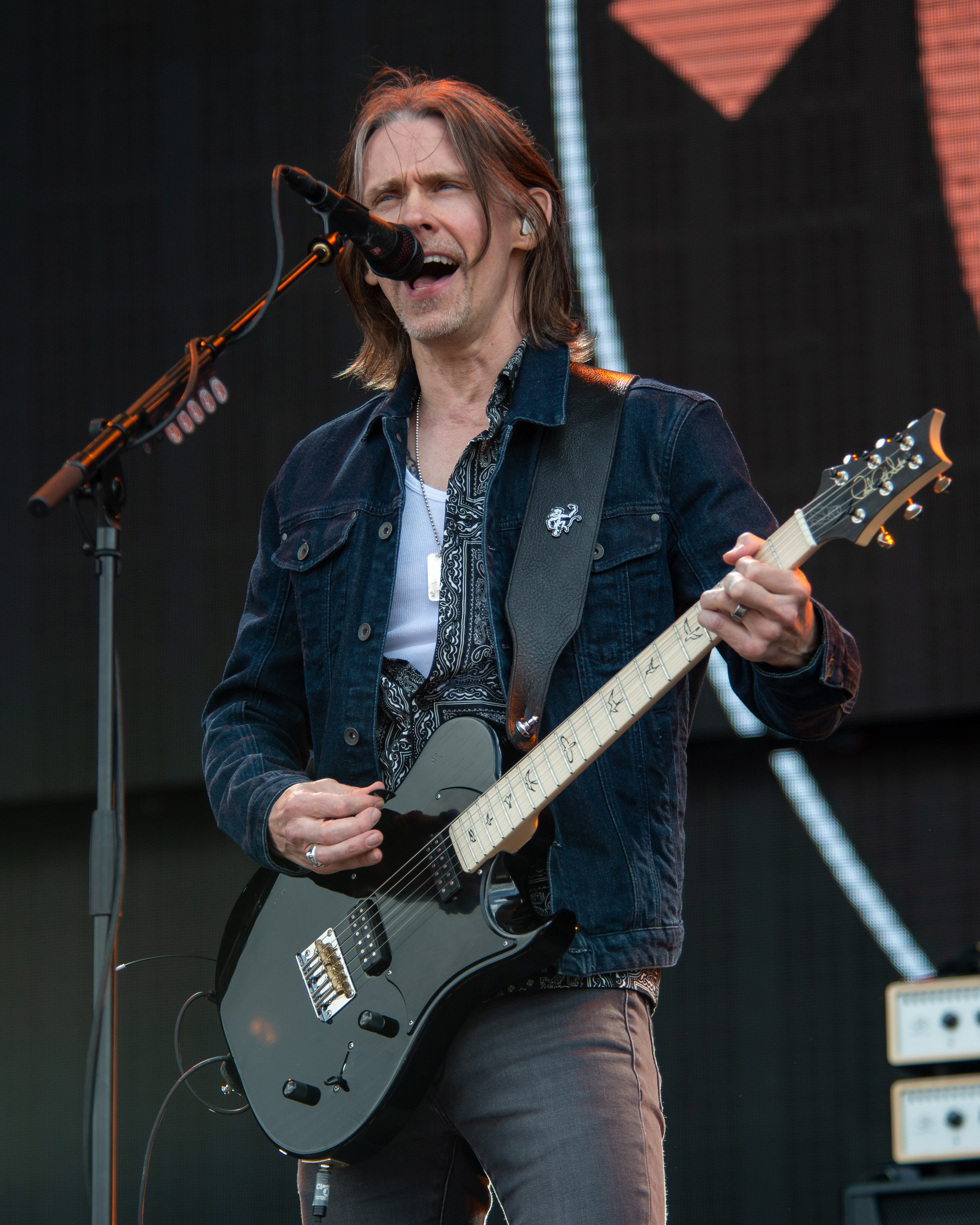
- Kennedy performing in 2022

Background information
- Born: Myles Richard Bass; November 27, 1969 (age 56); Boston, Massachusetts, U.S.
- Origin: Spokane, Washington, U.S.
- Genres: Alternative metal; blues; blues rock; hard rock; heavy metal; jazz-fusion; post-grunge
- Occupations: Musician; songwriter
- Instruments: Vocals; guitar
- Years active: 1988–present
- Labels: Epic; Wind-up; Universal Republic; Roadrunner; Napalm
- Member of: Alter Bridge; Slash featuring Myles Kennedy and the Conspirators
- Formerly of: Bittersweet; Amethyst; The Mayfield Four; Citizen Swing; Cosmic Dust; Kings of Chaos
- Website: myleskennedy.com

Myles Richard Bass (born November 27, 1969), known professionally as Myles Kennedy, is an American singer, guitarist, and songwriter. He is the lead vocalist and rhythm guitarist of the rock band Alter Bridge and of Slash featuring Myles Kennedy and the Conspirators alongside guitarist Slash. A former guitar instructor from Spokane, Washington, Kennedy has worked as a session musician and songwriter, making both studio and live appearances with several artists, and has been involved with several projects throughout his career.

Born in Boston, Massachusetts, and raised in Northern Idaho and Spokane, Kennedy attended Spokane Falls Community College to study music theory. He began his music career in 1990 as the lead guitarist of the instrumental jazz ensemble Cosmic Dust, with which he released one studio album. His second band, Citizen Swing, released two studio albums before disbanding in 1996. With fellow Citizen Swing member Craig Johnson, Kennedy founded the rock band The Mayfield Four, for which he provided lead vocals and guitar. The band released two studio albums and broke up in 2002. After declining an offer to audition as the lead vocalist of Velvet Revolver, he was asked to join Alter Bridge by Mark Tremonti in late 2003, formally joining in 2004, and he has been with the band ever since. He has released eight studio albums with Alter Bridge.

While Alter Bridge was on tour in 2008, Kennedy and former members of Led Zeppelin met and improvised as a group in an informal jam session, but the band never fully materialized. He then started working with Slash, featuring on the guitarist's 2010 eponymous solo album on two tracks and later serving as Slash's vocalist on tour. In 2012, Kennedy filled in with short notice for Guns N' Roses lead singer Axl Rose when Rose refused to show up for the band's Rock and Roll Hall of Fame induction ceremony. With Slash, Myles Kennedy and the Conspirators have recorded four studio albums. Kennedy has also released three solo albums: Year of the Tiger (2018), The Ides of March (2021), and The Art of Letting Go (2024).

== Early life ==
Kennedy was born as Myles Richard Bass on November 27, 1969, in Boston, Massachusetts, and subsequently lived in Northern Idaho. As a child, he moved to Spokane, Washington, where he grew up in a Christian Science family on a farm. His father, Richard Bass, died when he was four years old and his mother subsequently went on to marry a Methodist minister, and the family took the surname Kennedy. Before Kennedy attended Mead High School (which he attended with football player Jason Hanson and Everclear bassist Craig Montoya), he found musical inspiration from Led Zeppelin, Marvin Gaye, Stevie Wonder, and John Sykes' Blue Murder band. Kennedy began playing trumpet at the age of ten and was in a teen air guitar band with then best friends Michael Murphy, Mark Terzenbach and Bruce Kidd at 13. He later traded for a real guitar copying the playing style of Jimmy Page.

He found his singing voice by listening to his parents' Marvin Gaye and Stevie Wonder records, and also states that he was influenced by Robert Plant. He played guitar in the school's jazz band and trumpet in the school's marching band. He also spent some time playing in a local heavy metal band called Bittersweet with some of his friends Zia Uddin on drums, Jason Stewart as lead vocal, Mark Terzenbach (and later, Chris Steffens) on bass and Myles on lead guitar. After graduating in 1988, he enrolled in Spokane Falls Community College to study music.

== Career ==
=== Bittersweet and Amethyst: 1987–1990 ===
After participating in the Rock Off in Spokane, Washington on May 22, 1987, with his band Bittersweet, which consisted of Myles Kennedy (guitar), Mark Terzenbach (bass), Joel Tipke (keyboards), Zia Uddin (drums), and Jason Stewart (vocals), he met Mark Fekete (lead vocalist/rhythm guitarist) of Amethyst, And filled in as their lead guitarist for a season. Though Myles only filled in on lead guitar, he had always dabbled around with his passion for singing, which was later showcased in a guitar contest at a local music store in Spokane.

=== Cosmic Dust and Citizen Swing: 1990–1995 ===
Upon graduating from high school in 1988, Kennedy enrolled in a Commercial Music/Jazz Studies program at Spokane Falls Community College. Using the skills he learned from this course, in 1990 he began playing guitar for a jazz group called the Cosmic Dust Fusion Band, which was formed by keyboardist Jim Templeton in 1990. Kennedy's guitar work with Cosmic Dust was advanced; using his knowledge of jazz theory in conjunction with his advanced technical abilities, interweaving difficult techniques such as chord changes on impulse and precise shredding with rock music, he became a well-respected guitarist among local musicians. Cosmic Dust's first album, Journey, was released in 1991. The album was well received by critics. In 1993, the song "Spiritus" was awarded the Washington State Artist Trust Grant for $5,000.

After the release of Journey, Kennedy left Cosmic Dust to begin working on a new band that would become Citizen Swing, for which Kennedy provided both lead vocals and lead guitar. They were described as "a band that combined the sounds of funk, soul, R&B, blues and alternative into a unique and cohesive sound" and as "Stevie Ray Vaughn [sic] meets Stevie Wonder and then some." They released their first album, Cure Me with the Groove, in 1993. This album featured Kennedy (who helped produce the album), rhythm guitarist Craig Johnson, bassist Dave Turner (also of Cosmic Dust), drummer/percussionist Mike Tschirgi, and trumpeter Geoff Miller. Citizen Swing's second and final album was called Deep Down and was released in 1995. The band disbanded the same year. All the music and lyrics on that album were written by Kennedy. Journey, Cure Me with the Groove, and Deep Down are rare albums and are sought after by fans.

=== The Mayfield Four: 1995–2002 ===
In 1995, Kennedy started teaching guitar in a store called Rock City Music. By August 1996, he became the lead vocalist and lead guitarist of The Mayfield Four, a rock band he formed with his childhood friends Zia Uddin, Marty Meisner, and Craig Johnson (also of Citizen Swing). They signed a contract with Epic Records thanks to a critically acclaimed demo called Thirty Two Point Five Hours that the band recorded in 1996, followed by a live extended play called Motion in 1997. The Mayfield Four's debut album, Fallout, was supported with a fifteen-month tour with bands such as Creed, Big Wreck, and Stabbing Westward. The album was praised by critics, but it failed to chart, and ultimately became the only album by the band to feature rhythm guitarist Craig Johnson, who was fired from the band due to undisclosed reasons.

Following the Fallout tour, Kennedy made an appearance in the 2001 drama film Rock Star starring Mark Wahlberg and Jennifer Aniston. He said that he got a call from his manager telling him that the filmmakers needed someone who could sing high and that his name was suggested. On the set of the film, he met Wahlberg along with Zakk Wylde and Jason Bonham, who also appeared in the movie alongside several other notable musicians. Kennedy was the only actor in the movie whose actual singing voice was used. In the movie, directly paralleling a scene at the beginning of the film, Kennedy's character (Mike, also known as "Thor") is noticed by Wahlberg's character, Chris "Izzy" Cole, the lead singer of Thor's favorite band, Steel Dragon. Izzy pulls Thor onstage and sings the rest of the song with him, eventually telling him to finish the rest of the band's concert. The film was met with mostly mixed reviews, garnering a 52% "Rotten" score on Rotten Tomatoes.

The Mayfield Four's second and final album, Second Skin, was released in June 2001. Kennedy has since said that it is one of the most personal records he has made. The album has been critically acclaimed and Kennedy has commented on how it and Fallout are much more popular now than when they were released.

Though popular, The Mayfield Four never garnered enough exposure to break into the mainstream. In 2002, the future of the band began to look unlikely, and Kennedy began recording new music, which he described as "Daniel Lanois meets Massive Attack." The band went on hiatus that year, and would ultimately disband. In an interview with Pulse Weekly in 2004, Kennedy said that it was because he was "burned out with the whole rock industry at that point." However, three previously unreleased songs appeared on a fan-run Myspace page dedicated to and approved by The Mayfield Four in early 2010, causing rumors of a possible reunion to begin circulating. However, when asked about this during an interview, Kennedy replied that he does not see it happening.

=== Velvet Revolver audition offer: 2002 ===
After The Mayfield Four's unforeseen breakup, and due to a hearing disorder called tinnitus that he developed because of listening to music that he was recording at earsplitting volumes, Kennedy fell into depression in 2002. He said about music, "I can't do it any more. My ears won't let me." He said that he had grown "disillusioned with music and the music business," so he took a hiatus from playing music and went back to teaching guitar. However, in 2002, he was contacted by former Guns N' Roses guitarist Slash, who was looking for a vocalist for a band he was forming, but Kennedy declined the offer. Other sources state that Kennedy had sent in a demo tape but still ultimately declined an invitation to audition after being approached by Matt Sorum. Kennedy recalls, "They had reached out to me in 2002 when they were just getting together. They had sent me a demo tape, and I kind of sat on it for a month, and I didn't really follow up on it."

=== Alter Bridge: 2003–present ===
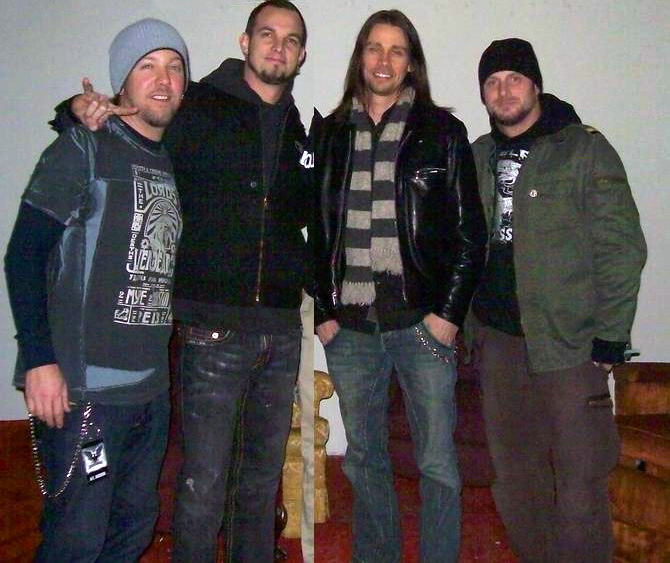
Kennedy (right center) with his Alter Bridge bandmates in 2008

Kennedy is best known as the lead vocalist and one of the two lead guitarists in the band, alongside Mark Tremonti (formerly of Creed). The band's origins lie in late 2003 when Kennedy was contacted by Tremonti, who was interested in having Kennedy lay down vocal tracks for some songs he had recently written. Tremonti and drummer Scott Phillips had reunited with former bassist Brian Marshall who had left Creed in 2000 to form a new band. Alter Bridge, taking its name from an actual bridge that used to be located near Tremonti's home in Detroit, was officially formed in January 2004. Coinciding with the official announcement of Alter Bridge's formation was an announcement regarding their debut album, One Day Remains, along with the release of that album's lead single, "Open Your Eyes." One Day Remains was released in 2004 on Wind-up Records. It received generally mixed to negative reviews and was certified Gold by the RIAA. Two other singles, "Find the Real" and "Broken Wings" were released. One Day Remains was the only album by a band with Kennedy as an official member that does not feature his guitar playing, before his 2014 album World on Fire as a part of Slash featuring Myles Kennedy and the Conspirators.

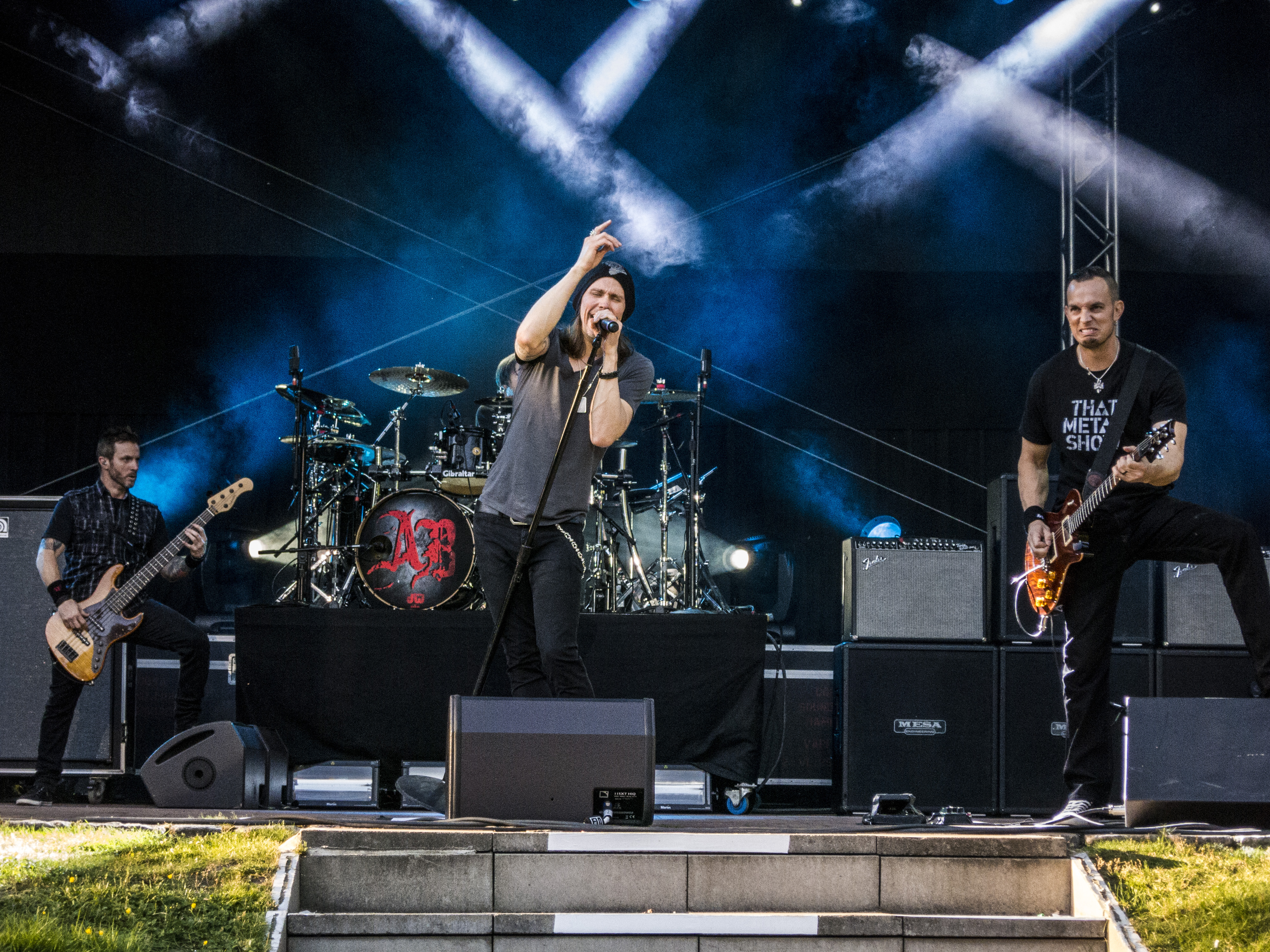
Alter Bridge performing in Hamburg in 2014

Following a successful tour in support of the album, Alter Bridge announced plans for a second release. The album, Blackbird, was released in 2007 on Universal Republic to mostly positive reviews. Unlike One Day Remains, which was largely written by Tremonti, Blackbird featured Kennedy's guitar playing as well as more of his songwriting contributions. Alter Bridge toured in support of Blackbird throughout 2007 and 2008, recording a concert film titled Live from Amsterdam and releasing it in 2009 via Amazon.com. It would later be released in stores in early 2011 after several delays.

Alter Bridge took a temporary break in early 2009 with its members working on other projects, but the band continued writing music throughout the year. The band regrouped later that year to begin work on their third album, AB III, which was released in 2010 on Roadrunner Records worldwide, except for North America where the album was self-released on Alter Bridge Recordings via EMI. For the album, Kennedy chose to write lyrics based on his own personal experiences with faith and believing. As such, it is lyrically the band's darkest album, with Kennedy calling it the most personal album he had made since The Mayfield Four's Second Skin. AB III has received critical acclaim. A second concert film, Live at Wembley, was released on March 26, 2012. The band reunited in late 2012 and recorded from April to July 2013 their fourth album titled Fortress, which was released on September 30, 2013. The band reconvened in January 2016 and, through that July, recorded their fifth album The Last Hero, which was released on October 7, 2016. Walk the Sky was released on October 18, 2019. Following the disruption of touring activities during the COVID-19 pandemic, Alter Bridge returned to the studio in 2022 and released their seventh studio album, Pawns & Kings, on October 14, 2022. The album received positive reviews from critics and featured some of the band's most guitar-driven material, with both Kennedy and Tremonti contributing prominently to the songwriting and lead guitar work. The band's eighth studio album, Alter Bridge, was released in 2026.

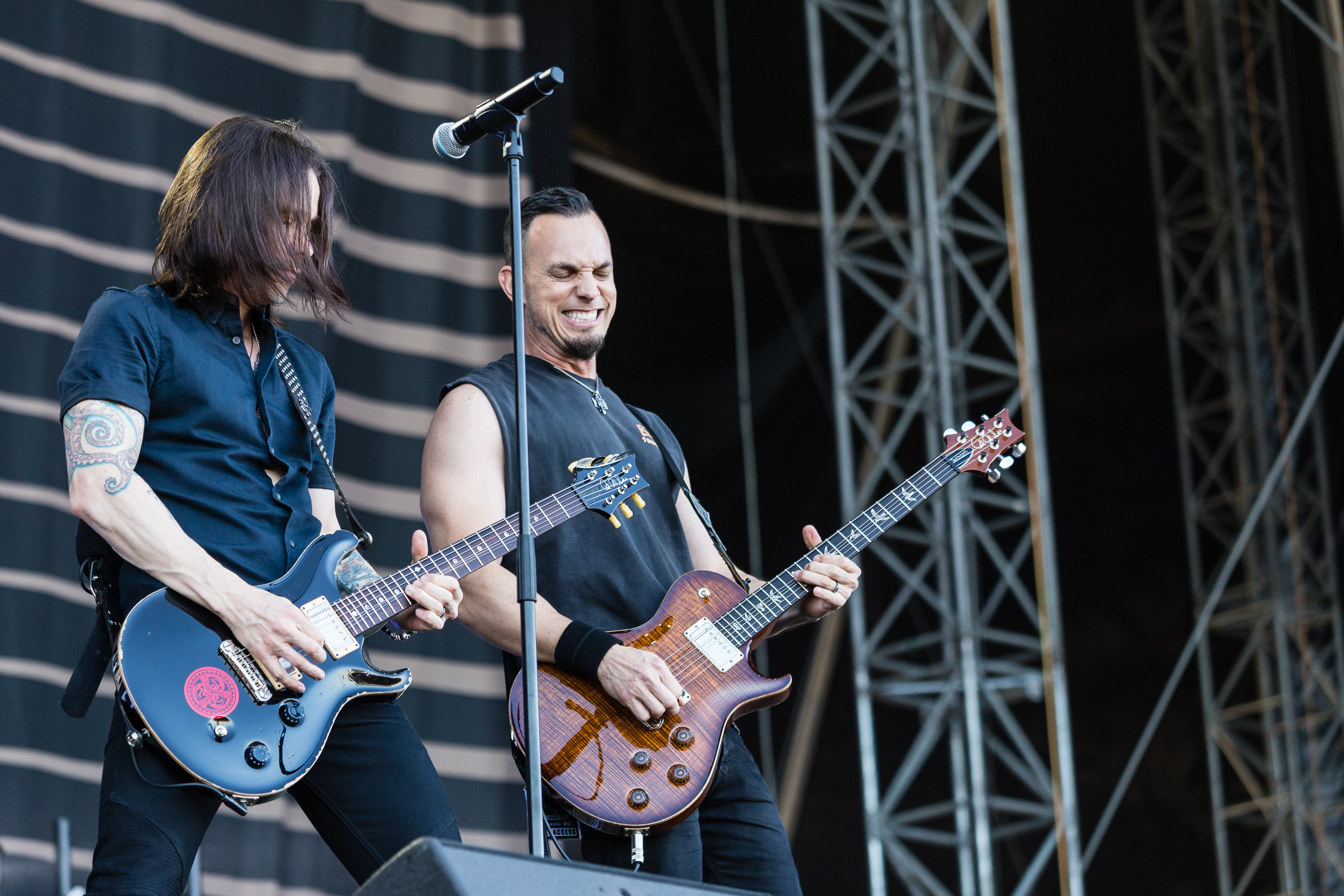
Kennedy (left) playing guitar with Tremonti in 2017.

Having joined Alter Bridge primarily as lead vocalist, Kennedy began to play rhythm guitar during live performances following the release of One Day Remains. He has since performed rhythm guitar on all of the band's subsequent releases and has contributed lead guitar parts both in the studio and during live performances. Although guitarist Mark Tremonti was initially regarded as the band's sole lead guitarist, Kennedy's role gradually expanded as his guitar abilities became more prominent within the group's songwriting and live arrangements. Over time, Alter Bridge developed a dual-guitar approach in which Kennedy and Tremonti shared rhythm and lead guitar responsibilities, including harmonized guitar passages, alternating solos, and collaborative riff writing. Kennedy has stated that lead guitar was his primary musical interest while growing up, and he has performed featured lead sections on numerous Alter Bridge songs.

== Solo career and collaborations ==
=== Work with Led Zeppelin members: 2008–2009 ===
I was just flattered beyond all belief to be in the same room with those guys. I mean, everything I ever learned about rock, I learned from Led Zeppelin. Just being near Jimmy Page was unbelievable.

— Myles Kennedy, on his experiences with Led Zeppelin.

Kennedy received a great amount of press coverage in late 2008, owing to a rumour that he was to join Led Zeppelin. After Zeppelin's one-off reunion in 2007, guitarist Jimmy Page and bassist John Paul Jones reportedly felt the band "still had something to offer." As reported by BBC News, Page and Jones were in the studio with Jason Bonham writing and recording material that was reportedly to be used for a new Zeppelin album. According to Bonham, singer Robert Plant was not involved. Page, Jones, and Bonham auditioned singers, fuelling rumours when they were reported to have attended an Alter Bridge concert. Twisted Sister frontman Dee Snider said that they were offering Kennedy the job to persuade Plant to reconsider. Alter Bridge guitarist Mark Tremonti said Kennedy "deserves" to play with Zeppelin.

Kennedy remained mostly silent about the rumours until January 2009. "I am not singing in Led Zeppelin or any offshoot of Led Zeppelin," he said. "I did have a great opportunity and it was something that I'm very grateful for. But Alter Bridge will go on, and that's that." He later confirmed, however, that he had written and rehearsed with Page, Jones and Bonham. He also said that it was Bonham who "got the ball rolling", since the two had met on the set of the 2001 film Rock Star.

"Working with them felt surreal," he recalled a decade later. "Jimmy played the Les Paul, and just being in the room with that guitar would have been enough for me. But standing next to him as he's playing those iconic riffs, the hairs on the back of my neck are standing up. We played 'No Quarter', 'Kashmir'… We did 'Carouselambra', which was a really challenging arrangement. A lot of wonderful moments." It is unconfirmed if the songs he wrote with Page, Jones, and Bonham will ever be released. Kennedy maintains that the band, had it materialised, would not have been called Led Zeppelin.

=== Solo career: 2009–2010; 2017–present ===
Kennedy has performed two solo benefit concerts: one hosted by Paul Reed Smith and PRS Guitars to benefit cancer patients, and another to benefit abused children. The latter was called Bofest 2009 and was headlined by Kennedy on October 17, 2009. In early 2009, Kennedy announced a solo side project. He described the material as "dreamy" and "[not] aggressive", saving those songs for Alter Bridge. He also said, "It's more singer/songwriter based. I will say it's going to be interesting." He later posted on his Myspace page that he is working with some "great people" and that he has details coming at a future date. Slash announced via Facebook on February 1, 2010, that he would be appearing on Kennedy's solo record, and Kennedy confirmed this via Myspace. Kennedy had originally hoped that his album would be released in early 2010, digitally first and then on CD, but he has since put its release on hold. However, he recently said that he is still too busy to release the album as he stated that he would like to tour to promote it, but he wanted to release it on December 21, 2012, as a joke, although a firm release date has not yet been announced.

When asked if the record would be a departure from his previous work, he replied that it is different and again referred to the singer-songwriter approach that would be featured on it and that it would not be a hard rock album. He also said that "it was maybe the most difficult thing I've ever done in the sense that I didn't have a band." He also said that the music is very intimate and that it features piano as well. In an interview with Guitarist UK magazine, he said that some of the songs will feature jazz, blues, and R&B influences, while others still "get quite atmospheric and ethereal," comparing the sound to Daniel Lanois and Massive Attack, while assuring fans that the rock style will still be present. In the same Guitarist interview, he confirmed the titles of three songs that will appear on his record: "The Light of Day", "Complicated Man", and "The Bar Fly". Most recently, he confirmed that another song will be titled "Love Rain Down". He said in an interview with CraveOnline that "Love Rain Down" differs from anything else he has ever written. In 2017, he said he shelved the songs he had written and started over. His debut solo album, Year of the Tiger, was released on March 9, 2018. Kennedy's second solo album, The Ides of March, was released on May 14, 2021.

On October 11, 2024, Myles released his third solo album, The Art of Letting Go, revealing plans to tour Europe and the US. In interviews, Myles described the album as a "full-on riff based rock record", and mentioned how the record was recorded on, and often inspired by, his newly released signature PRS guitar.

=== Work with Slash: 2009–present ===
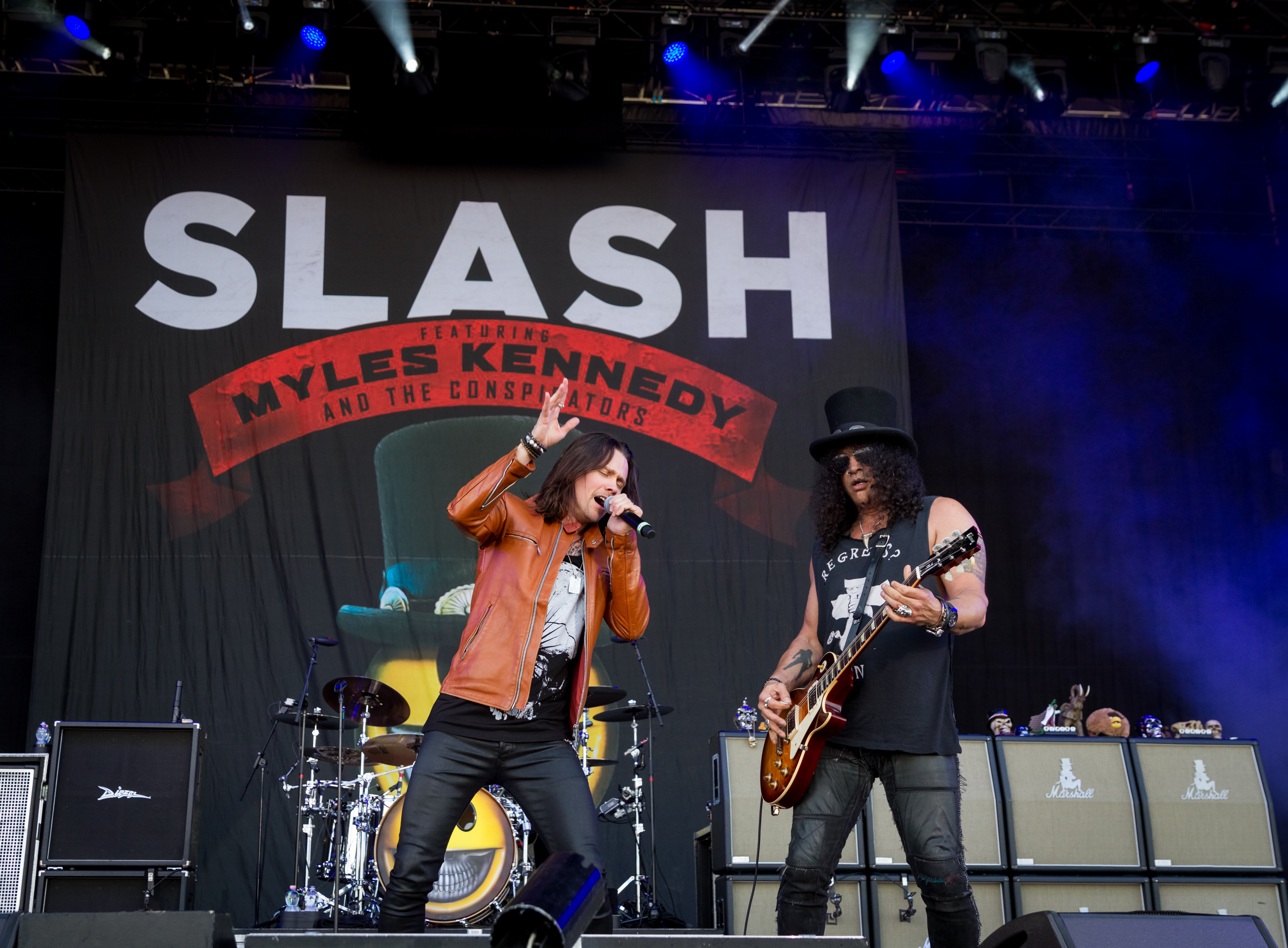
Kennedy performing with Slash and the Conspirators in 2015

Kennedy has become very well known for his collaborations with Guns N' Roses lead guitarist Slash. In late 2009, it was reported that they would be working together on Slash's self-titled debut solo album. Slash later confirmed that Kennedy was chosen to sing and co-write the final song, "Starlight", on his album. Other musicians who appeared on the album include Ozzy Osbourne, Adam Levine of Maroon 5, Dave Grohl of the Foo Fighters, Kid Rock, and Chris Cornell of Soundgarden. Then, according to MusicRadar, Slash asked Kennedy to co-write and sing another song, "Back from Cali", which was added to the album at the last minute, making him the only musician to appear on more than one song on the album's standard track listing. The album was released in April 2010.

On February 3, 2010, Slash announced that Kennedy would be the lead vocalist for his band on tour. On tour, Kennedy performed a number of songs found throughout Slash's catalog. Slash and Kennedy were also the supporting act on Ozzy Osbourne's tour in 2010. The other members of Slash's band are rhythm guitarist Bobby Schneck (replaced as of the Apocalyptic Love tour with Frank Sidoris), bassist Todd Kerns (formerly of Age of Electric), and drummer Brent Fitz (formerly of Theory of a Deadman). In late 2010, Kennedy and Slash appeared on That Metal Show, a talk show on VH1 Classic. On November 14, 2011, Slash released a concert film and live album titled Made in Stoke 24/7/11 featuring Kennedy and the rest of his band.

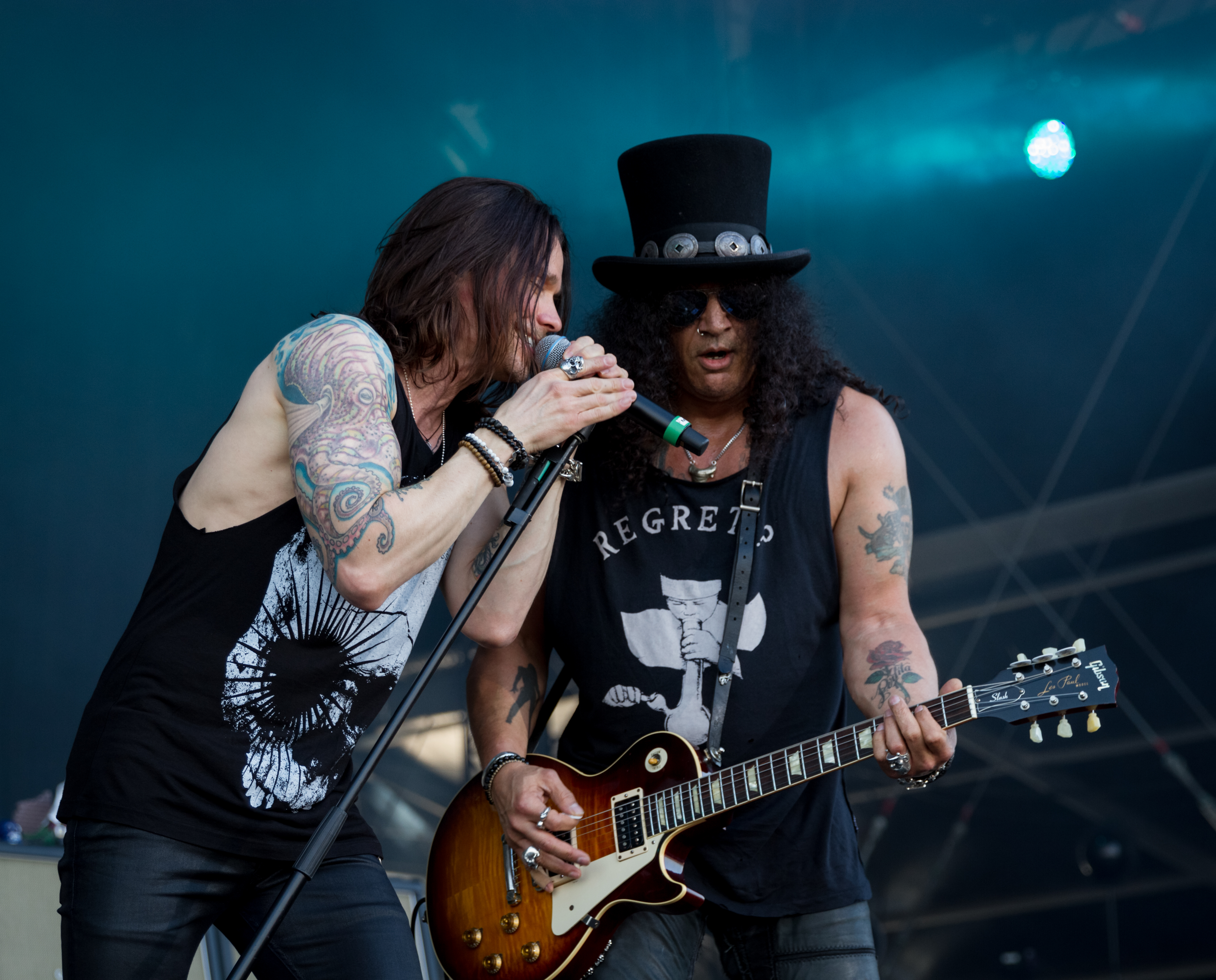
Kennedy and Slash in 2016

Slash's second solo album featured Myles Kennedy, this time as the sole vocalist. It was also announced that bandmates Bobby Schneck, Todd Kerns, and Brent Fitz, along with Slash, would complete the lineup for the album. In an interview with MusicRadar, Slash confirmed that it would be less of an actual solo album and more of a collaboration album with Kennedy, and that he was not sure if the album will be billed to Slash or a new name entirely. As of December 2011, three songs had been recorded: "Halo", "Standing in the Sun", and "Bad Rain". Slash has described the music as "very heavy". The album was released on May 22, 2012. A behind-the-scenes video was also released with this announcement. Titled Apocalyptic Love, the album will be billed to Slash featuring Myles Kennedy and the Conspirators, featuring Kennedy, Kerns, and Fitz as members of Slash's band. The band performed the album in its entirety on April 11, 2012, at the Revolver Golden God Awards. The first single, "You're a Lie", was released to rock radio on February 27, 2012; a 30-second preview of the song was released online. Kennedy has reportedly said that some of the lyrics on the album are about his earlier experiences with drugs. On April 14, 2012, Kennedy performed three Guns N' Roses songs with five former members of Guns N' Roses during their Rock and Roll Hall of Fame induction in Axl Rose's absence. In 2013, he also toured with Kings of Chaos, along with Slash and other ex-Guns N' Roses members. The band's second collective album World on Fire, produced by Michael "Elvis" Baskette, was released on September 16, 2014. The band's third album Living the Dream, again produced by Michael "Elvis" Baskette, was released on September 21, 2018. The fourth record, titled 4 and produced by Dave Cobb, was released on February 11, 2022.

=== Other session work: 2001–present ===
Kennedy is further well known for his work as a session musician and songwriter, having collaborated with several artists. In 2001, he appeared on the album Striped Suit: Lo-Fi by the jazz-rock band Mulligan, playing guitar solos on the songs "Faron" and "Make It Three". In that same year, he provided backing vocals to the song "Breakthrough" by Big Wreck from The Pleasure and the Greed. He also worked with the Spokane based nu-metal band Five Foot Thick on their 2003 album Blood Puddle, providing backing vocals to the song "Ducked Out". In 2005, he sang the chorus of "Nameless Faceless" by Fozzy with Fozzy frontman Chris Jericho from their album All That Remains. In 2008, he sang a duet with Sevendust lead vocalist Lajon Witherspoon on Sevendust's song "Sorrow" from Chapter VII: Hope & Sorrow. Also in 2008, Kennedy made a guest appearance on Mark Tremonti's guitar instructional DVD The Sound & the Story, to which Kennedy provided an in-depth lesson on how to play his guitar solo on the Alter Bridge song "Blackbird". In 2009, he appeared on Slash's self-titled album, co-writing and singing lead vocals on the songs "Back from Cali" and "Starlight". In addition, he has made live appearances with Sevendust and Gov't Mule. In 2011 it was announced that he will appear on a planned tribute album to Tommy Bolin. Further details were announced in January 2012 that the album would be called Great Gypsy Soul. It was released on March 27, 2012, on 429 Records, and Kennedy appeared on a song called "Dreamer" with Nels Cline of Wilco. Other contributors include Steve Lukather, Joe Bonamassa, Peter Frampton, and Glenn Hughes. In 2016, he collaborated with rapper Darryl McDaniels and Disturbed bassist John Moyer on the song "Flames". Also in 2016, he sang on "Black & White" on the Richards/Crane debut album, World Stands Still.

== Artistry and influences ==
Kennedy is influenced by a wide range of artists of several genres. His earliest influence was Led Zeppelin, although he drew his singing influences from jazz, blues, rhythm and blues, and soul artists when he discovered Stevie Wonder and Marvin Gaye albums in his parents' record collection. He said that he owned Stevie Wonder's 1982 compilation album Stevie Wonder's Original Musiquarium I, which was one of his earliest inspirations as a singer. From there, he discovered Songs in the Key of Life, which he has since stated is one of his favorite albums, and today cites Stevie Wonder as a major influence on his singing. He has also cited other jazz players and soul singers John Coltrane, Al Green, Mike Stern, Miles Davis, Otis Redding, Frank Gambale, Pat Metheny, Lyle Mays, and Curtis Mayfield as early influences. He also loves blues music. Additional influences include Guns N' Roses, U2, AC/DC, Mastodon, and Radiohead.

=== Singing style ===
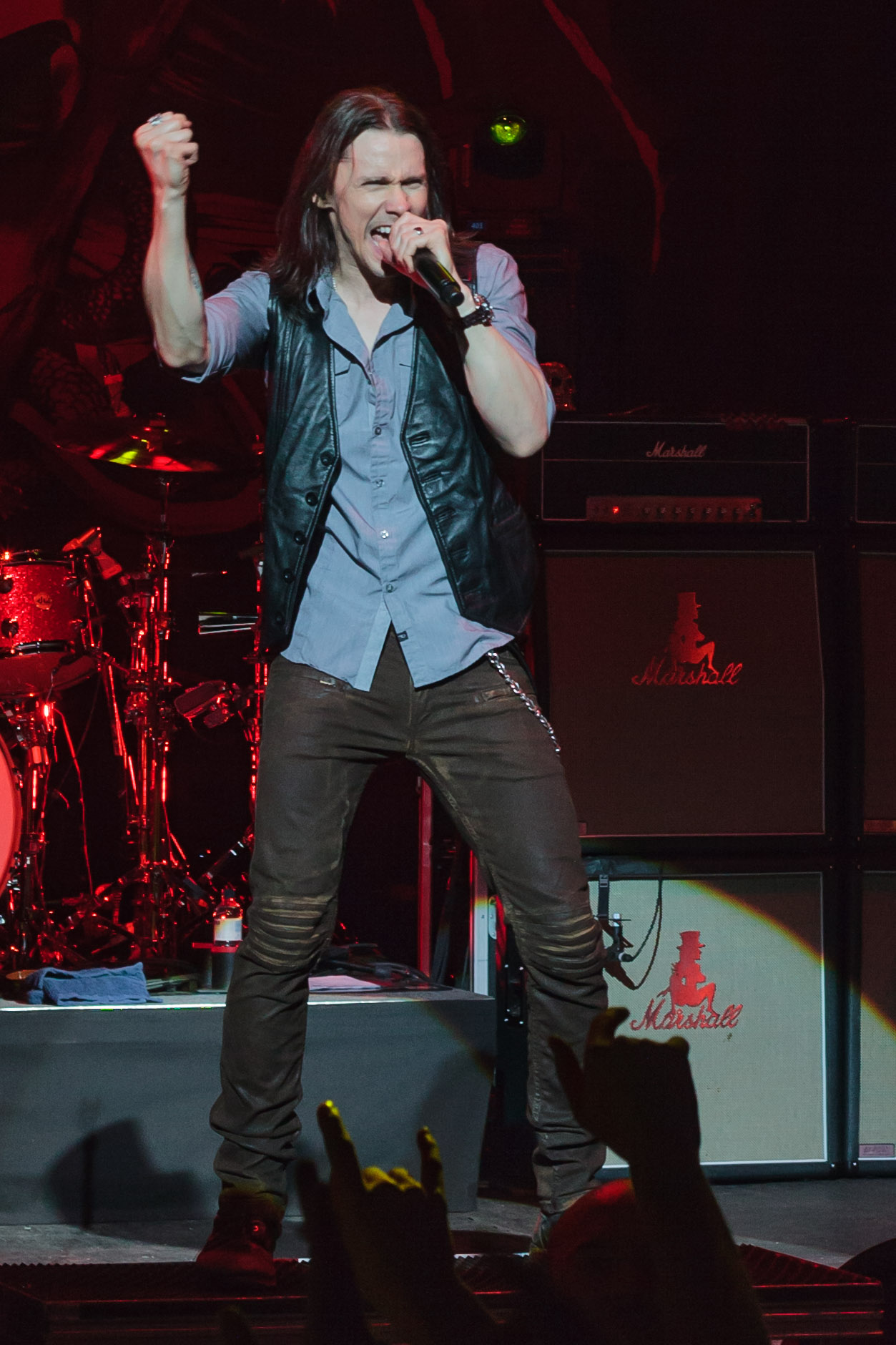
Kennedy singing in 2012

Kennedy's favorite singers include Jeff Buckley, Robert Plant, Bon Scott, Chris Whitley, and k.d. lang. He has stated on several occasions that Jeff Buckley was, and is, a major influence on him as a singer. When asked to describe his vocal style, he said, "I wanted to fuse together my favorite elements of rock and soul singers into something I could call my own. The inflections of Stevie Wonder with the soaring qualities of someone like Buckley." He states that Buckley's "emotional intensity" was one of the most inspirational things for him when it came to singing, and that it made him accept and embrace the fact that he is a tenor. He often performs Buckley's famous cover of "Hallelujah" (originally by Leonard Cohen) during acoustic performances. At one point, he received lessons from Ron Anderson, a bel canto vocal coach who has worked with a wide range of singers, including Axl Rose, Shania Twain, Enrique Iglesias, Chris Cornell, Ozzy Osbourne, Eddie Vedder, Kelly Clarkson, and several others. When asked about his number one secret when it came to singing, Kennedy replied, "Dig deep into your soul and sing as if your life depends on it. Leave your mark. People react to emotion more than technique." Kennedy, who possesses a four-octave vocal range, has been praised for his ability as a singer. Velvet Revolver guitarist Slash, whose touring band consists of Kennedy, has called him "fucking amazing", calling his style "surreal". About Kennedy's ability to recreate Guns N' Roses songs on tour, Slash said, "Myles is fucking amazing. It's very surreal how he handles the stuff he sings. I'm doing GN'R songs I've never done solo before, and Myles manages to own them without changing the style or trajectory of the song. Which is a fantastic fucking ability." Kennedy is often compared to Soundgarden vocalist Chris Cornell.

=== Guitar playing ===
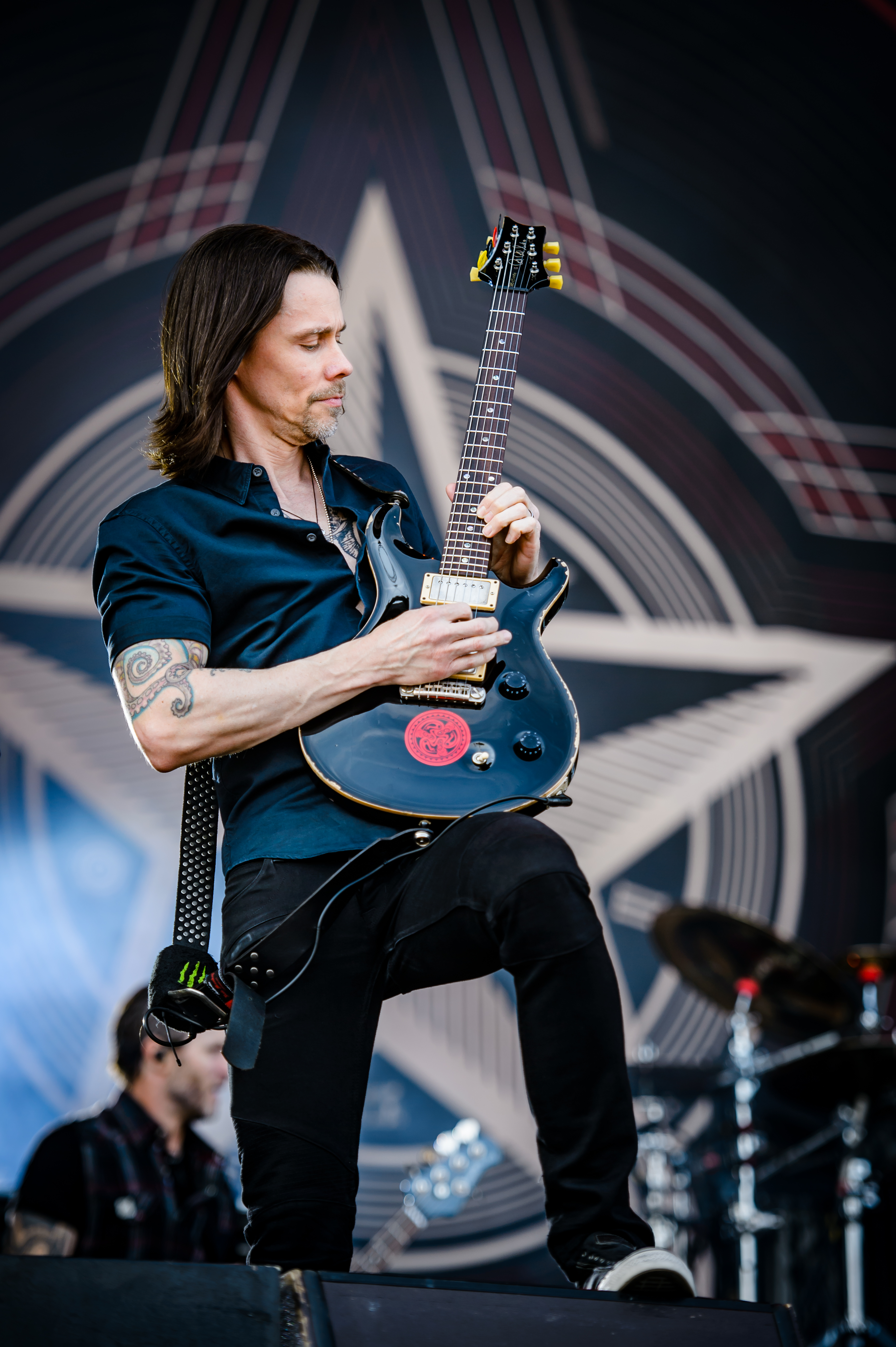
Kennedy playing guitar with Alter Bridge in 2017

Kennedy, a former guitar instructor, is also recognized as an accomplished guitarist. He began learning how to play the guitar by listening to Led Zeppelin records and mimicking Jimmy Page's guitar parts. He said in an interview, "I started off strictly as a lead guitar player. When I first started playing 25 years ago, that was all I’d do is sit in my room and learn solos." He also recalled being inspired by Eddie Van Halen: "When I was in my early teens, I heard 'Eruption' one day and was like, 'That is the most incredible thing I’ve ever heard,' and I begged my mother to give me an advance on my allowance for the next month and go buy that record." Over the next few years, and throughout the 1990s, Kennedy played primarily lead guitar. His early work with Cosmic Dust and Citizen Swing featured a jazz-influenced rock flavor, combining several advanced techniques used in jazz. He would later join Alter Bridge primarily as a lead vocalist, but began playing rhythm guitar on the band's first tour. Mark Tremonti said, "We knew Myles was an amazing singer, that’s why we hired him. What we found out when we toured the first record was that he’s also an incredibly gifted guitar player and songwriter, as well as a vocalist."

In an interview with Ultimate Guitar Archive, Tremonti said:

I remember walking up to my bedroom one night when he was practicing down in the room. The first time I knew he could play guitar well was when I was walking by his room and I heard all this jazz going on and I thought it was a CD. And I stepped in and there he was blazing away on just this ridiculous jazzy, jazzy stuff. And he’d kind of hidden it from me because I think he just didn’t want to step on my toes. He knew we had called because of his voice and not because of his guitar playing and then that guitar playing kind of became our secret weapon.

Kennedy played rhythm guitar on Blackbird and has since played co-lead on several Alter Bridge tracks. In an article about Kennedy as a guitarist on Lemon Squeezings, writer Steve Sauer noted his dexterity and steady rhythm playing. Doug Clark, a writer for The Spokesman-Review and one of Kennedy's former guitar students, wrote that "his six-string skills are pyrotechnically brilliant." Kennedy notes that his job as a guitar player, especially recently with Alter Bridge, is to add texture and colors to the music.

=== Lyrics and themes ===
In addition, Kennedy is the primary lyricist of Alter Bridge and his previous band, The Mayfield Four. His lyrics, which are usually fairly straightforward stylistically, often touch on dark subjects such as death and addiction. On Alter Bridge's first two albums (the lyrics of the former were primarily written by Tremonti, however), the lyrics are about "hope and perseverance in the face of adversity." However, he has been known to write darker lyrics, as heard most notably on Alter Bridge's third album, AB III, which is a loose concept album based on his own personal struggles with faith and spirituality. Similarly, the lyrical themes of The Mayfield Four's second album, Second Skin, touch on struggling with love and substance abuse. Second Skin, Apocalyptic Love, World on Fire and The Ides of March are the only albums to feature lyrics written by Kennedy that contain profanity.

== Personal life ==
Kennedy currently resides in Spokane, Washington with his wife, Selena, whom he married on June 14, 2003. According to Alter Bridge lead guitarist Mark Tremonti, Kennedy is an atheist, although in an article titled "Losing My Religion" from a November 2010 issue of Kerrang! magazine, Kennedy said he places himself "somewhere in the middle" between being an atheist and a Christian. In an interview on the Blairing Out with Eric Blair Show at the NAMM Show in 2009, Kennedy mentioned that despite being raised in a Christian household, he is not a religious person and he does not believe in any organized religion. In an interview with CraveOnline, he said "I would consider myself a part of the growing segment of people who question authority and scrutinize concepts that no longer seem as logical as they once did. [...] I don't find peace in the same concepts that many hold as truth. Believe me, I tried. It's not like I didn't spend most of my life submersed in the bosom of doctrine or dogma." In 2014, he identified himself as an agnostic.

Kennedy has been identified as an avid reader and he says that he especially enjoys the work of John Irving, describing Irving's A Prayer for Owen Meany as one of his favorite novels. He has also cited Effortless Mastery by Kenny Werner as one of his favorites. When asked about his hobbies, he replied: "I guess I have been pretty fortunate since I have turned what was a hobby into a living. Music pretty much consumes me. If I’m not writing, performing or listening I am probably trying to learn more about its history." He has five tattoos: a dragon on his left forearm, a koi fish on his right forearm, an octopus on his right upper arm, and two elephant heads on his chest. He describes the dragon and the fish as symbols of strength, while the octopus was originally supposed to be a small squid but became much larger than he had intended. He got the dragon tattoo first because of a toy he brought back from Japan as a child, and the koi was added a year later after he learned of an ancient Chinese legend of koi swimming up the Yellow River to become dragons. He has said he wants to get more tattoos in the future.

=== Charity work ===
Kennedy has served on the board of directors for the Mead Food Bank since 2003. In addition, he co-founded the Future Song Foundation, a charity organization "that provides funding to ensure that kids have access to musical instruction and instruments which are fundamental parts of a complete education", with his wife in 2015. He serves as a director of the program. A proponent of wildlife conservation efforts, Kennedy is a supporter of the International Fund for Animal Welfare and is outspoken of his criticism of the ivory trade on X.

== Discography ==
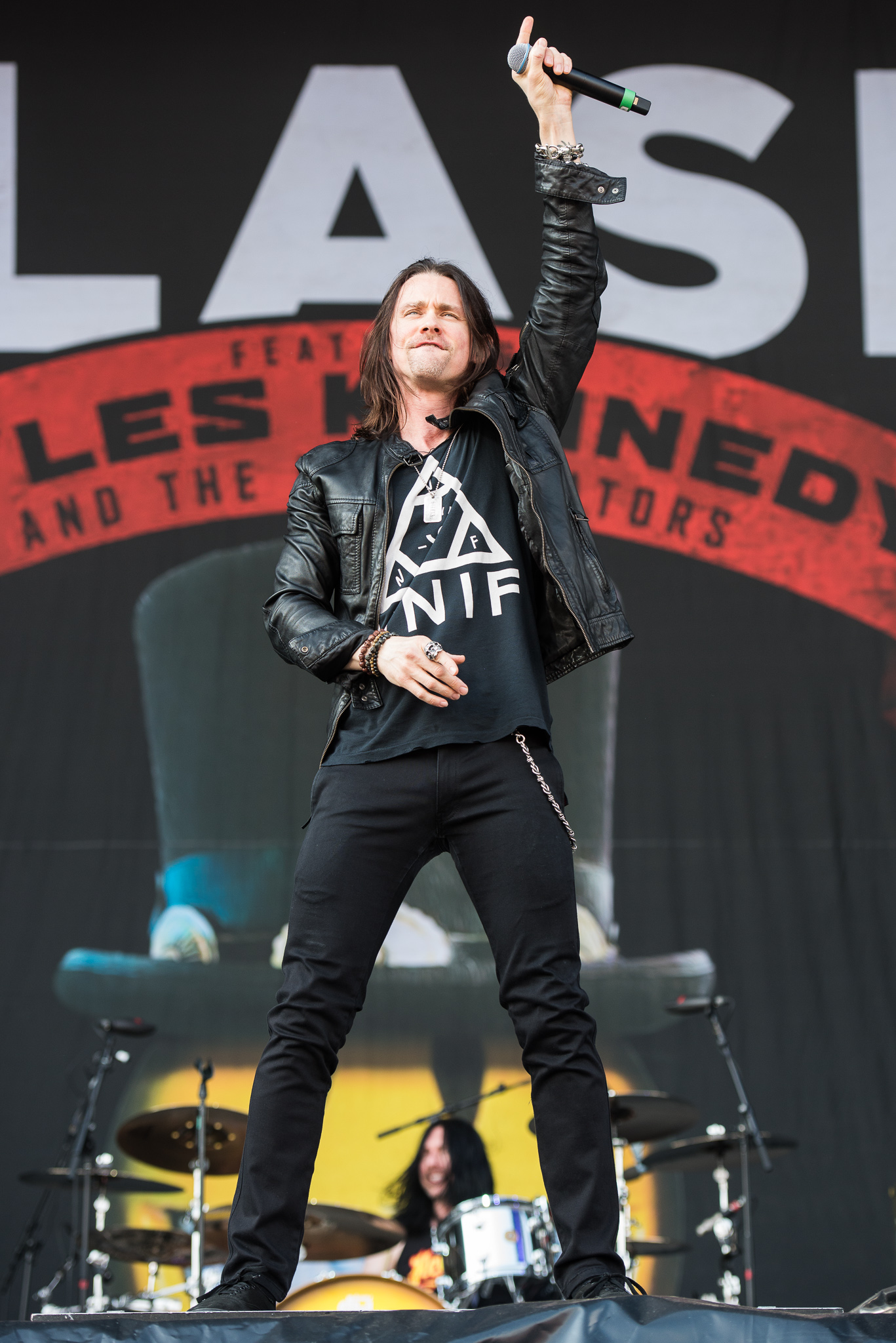
Kennedy in 2015

Cosmic Dust

- Journey (1991)

Citizen Swing

- Cure Me with the Groove (1993)
- Deep Down (1995)

The Mayfield Four

- Fallout (1998)
- Second Skin (2001)

Alter Bridge

- One Day Remains (2004)
- Blackbird (2007)
- AB III (2010)
- Fortress (2013)
- The Last Hero (2016)
- Walk the Sky (2019)
- Pawns & Kings (2022)
- Alter Bridge (2026)

Slash featuring Myles Kennedy and the Conspirators

- Apocalyptic Love (2012)
- World on Fire (2014)
- Living the Dream (2018)
- 4 (2022)
- Flying Blind (2027)

Solo

- Year of the Tiger (2018)
- The Ides of March (2021)
- The Art of Letting Go (2024)

== Filmography ==
Films
| Year | Film | Role | Notes |
|---|---|---|---|
| 2001 | Rock Star | Mike | Cameo appearance |
