= Fallout (The Mayfield Four album) =

Studio album by The Mayfield Four
- Released: May 26, 1998
- Genres: Alternative rock; soul
- Length: 58:28
- Labels: Epic; Sony
- Producer: Jerry Harrison

The Mayfield Four chronology
Motion (1997)	Fallout (1998)	Second Skin (2001)

Myles Kennedy chronology
Motion (1997)	Fallout (1998)	Second Skin (2001)

Singles from Fallout
- 1. "Always" Released: 1998; 2. "Don't Walk Away" Released: 1998

Professional ratings
Review scores
Source	Rating
AllMusic	4/5 stars

Fallout is the debut album released by the Mayfield Four, an American rock band. The album spawned two singles: "Don't Walk Away" and "Always". "Inner City Blues" is a cover of a Marvin Gaye song, "Inner City Blues (Make Me Wanna Holler)".

This album features a much more soul-influenced sound than their second album, Second Skin, which moved the band's music into a more hard rock direction. The themes explored on this album touch upon love, heartbreak and redemption.

== Track listing ==
All tracks are written by Myles Kennedy except where noted.

No.	Title	Writer(s)	Length
1.	"Shuddershell"	Johnson; Kennedy; Meisner; Uddin	4:06
2.	"Suckerpunch"		2:53
3.	"Forfeit"	Johnson; Kennedy; Meisner; Uddin	4:07
4.	"Always"		4:36
5.	"No One Nothing"		3:44
6.	"12/31"		5:55
7.	"Fallout"		4:25
8.	"Big Verb"		5:30
9.	"Realign"		4:37
10.	"Don't Walk Away"		5:27
11.	"Overflow"	Johnson; Kennedy; Meisner; Uddin	6:58
12.	"Inner City Blues"	Marvin Gaye; James Nyx Jr.	5:04
Total length:			58:28

Japanese version
No.	Title	Length
13.	"10K (live version from Motion)"	2:36
Total length:		61:04

== Personnel ==
The Mayfield Four

- Myles Kennedy – vocals, lead guitar, piano, Mellotron
- Craig Johnson – guitar, lap steel, backing vocals
- Zia Uddin – drums, percussion, tabla, backing vocals
- Marty Meisner – bass, backing vocals

Additional personnel

- Jerry Harrison – producer
- Karl Derfler – engineer
- Aaron Warner – assistant engineer
- Brendan O'Brien – mixing
- Ryan Williams – assistant mix engineer
- Gregg Keplinger – drum techn
