= The Mayfield Four =

American rock band

- Origin: Spokane, Washington
- Genres: Hard rock; alternative rock
- Years active: 1996–2002
- Label: Epic Records
- Members: Myles Kennedy; Craig Johnson; Marty Meisner; Zia Uddin

The Mayfield Four was an American rock band active from 1996 to 2002. They are best known for being fronted by Myles Kennedy before going on to form Alter Bridge. The band also consisted of guitarist Craig Johnson, bassist Marty Meisner and drummer Zia Uddin.

After releasing a demo titled Thirty Two Point Five Hours, the band signed with Epic Records. The following year, they released a live extended play called Motion. The band's 1998 debut album, Fallout, was supported with a fifteen-month tour with Creed, Big Wreck, and Stabbing Westward. The album was the only to feature rhythm guitarist Craig Johnson, who was fired from the band due to undisclosed reasons. Their second and final album, Second Skin, was released in June 2001.

In 2002, the future of the band began to look unlikely, and Kennedy began recording new music. The band went on hiatus that year, and would ultimately disband.

After being fired from the band, Craig Johnson retired from the music scene and became a real estate agent. He was later killed in a gunfight with police on October 16, 2017.

== Discography ==
=== Albums ===
- Fallout (1998)
- Second Skin (2001)

=== EPs ===
- Motion (1997)

=== Demos ===
- Thirty Two Point Five Hours (1996)
