= Walk the Sky =

Studio album by Alter Bridge
- Released: October 18, 2019
- Recorded: March–May 2019
- Studios: Studio Barbarosa (Orlando, Florida)
- Genres: Alternative metal; hard rock; progressive metal
- Length: 60:20
- Label: Napalm
- Producer: Michael Baskette

Alter Bridge chronology
Live at the Royal Albert Hall (featuring The Parallax Orchestra) (2018)	Walk the Sky (2019)	Pawns & Kings (2022)

Singles from Walk the Sky
- 1. "Wouldn't You Rather" Released: June 28, 2019; 2. "Pay No Mind" Released: July 25, 2019; 3. "Take the Crown" Released: August 22, 2019; 4. "In the Deep" Released: September 12, 2019; 5. "Dying Light" Released: October 3, 2019; 6. "Godspeed" Released: December 21, 2019; 7. "Native Son" Released: September 15, 2020

Professional ratings
Review scores
Source	Rating
Blabbermouth.net	7.5/10
Classic Rock	4/5 stars
Distorted Sound	8/10 stars
Kerrang!	4/5 stars
Q	8/10 stars
Sonic Perspectives	8.5/10 stars
Time for Metal	10/10
Ultimate Guitar Archive	8.3/10

Walk the Sky is the sixth studio album by American rock band Alter Bridge, released on October 18, 2019 via Napalm Records. It was produced by the band's longtime collaborator Michael Baskette, who has produced all of the band's albums since 2007's Blackbird. The album's first single, "Wouldn't You Rather", was released on June 28, 2019. A second single, "Pay No Mind", was released on July 25, 2019, with four further singles, "Take the Crown", "In the Deep", "Dying Light", and "Godspeed" later released. The album's cover art was designed by Dan Tremonti, brother of guitarist Mark Tremonti; its packaging was designed by Sturge Media and Janus Music Mgmt. Along with the announcement of the album's release, it was also revealed that the band would embark on a European tour with Shinedown, Sevendust and the Raven Age towards the end of 2019.

A deluxe edition of the album, titled Walk the Sky 2.0, was announced on September 15, 2020 and due out on November 6, 2020 via Napalm Records. It features a seven-track EP that consists of a brand new song, "Last Rites", plus six live favourites from Walk the Sky.

It was named one of the 50 best rock albums of 2019 by Loudwire.

== Background ==
Walk the Sky was recorded from the beginning of March through to May 2019. This album was recorded differently from the band's previous record due to scheduling constraints, with vocalist Myles Kennedy and guitarist Mark Tremonti sharing their own song ideas, which were then moulded into shape alongside bassist Brian Marshall and drummer Scott Phillips. On previous albums, Kennedy and Tremonti would combine ideas and riffs with producer Michael Baskette.

"It's kinda like a John Carpenter movie — this old-school synth-wave kind of vibe," Tremonti explained in a 2019 interview with Kerrang! "Somebody might hear the record and have no idea that was intended, but for a batch of songs, I tapped into some old loops that I either created or found randomly online, and worked with them in the background to inspire me to go in a different direction. I loved working like that. We challenge ourselves to not repeat ourselves and find new inspiration to add a different layer to what we do. It's particularly challenging when you've had so many records, but when I showed Myles what I was thinking, he absolutely loved it and was on board right away."

== Track listing ==
All tracks are written by Alter Bridge.

Standard edition
No.	Title	Length
1.	"One Life"	1:23
2.	"Wouldn't You Rather"	3:51
3.	"In the Deep"	3:50
4.	"Godspeed"	4:16
5.	"Native Son"	4:15
6.	"Take the Crown"	4:47
7.	"Indoctrination"	4:40
8.	"The Bitter End"	3:44
9.	"Pay No Mind"	4:16
10.	"Forever Falling"	5:10
11.	"Clear Horizon"	4:56
12.	"Walking on the Sky"	4:55
13.	"Tear Us Apart"	4:31
14.	"Dying Light"	5:46
Total length:		60:20

Walk the Sky 2.0 (deluxe edition bonus disc)
No.	Title	Length
15.	"Last Rites"	4:07
16.	"Wouldn't You Rather" (live)	4:03
17.	"Pay No Mind" (live)	4:29
18.	"Native Son" (live)	4:27
19.	"Godspeed" (live)	4:28
20.	"In the Deep" (live)	4:03
21.	"Dying Light" (live)	5:58
Total length:		91:15

== Personnel ==
Alter Bridge

- Myles Kennedy – vocals, guitar, strings, keyboards, programming
- Mark Tremonti – guitar, vocals, lead vocals on "Forever Falling"
- Brian Marshall – bass
- Scott Phillips – drums

Production

- Michael Baskette – producer, mixing, strings, keyboards, programming
- Jef Moll – engineer, digital editing
- Josh Saldate – assistant engineer
- Brad Blackwood – mastering

Artwork

- Daniel Tremonti – cover art
- Dan Sturge – photos
- Janus Music Mgmt. – packaging and layout

== Charts ==
Chart (2019)	Peak position
Australian Albums (ARIA)	7
Austrian Albums (Ö3 Austria)	3
Belgian Albums (Ultratop Flanders)	32
Belgian Albums (Ultratop Wallonia)	28
Canadian Albums (Billboard)	27
Czech Albums (ČNS IFPI)	69
Dutch Albums (Album Top 100)	16
French Albums (SNEP)	74
German Albums (Offizielle Top 100)	5
Hungarian Albums (MAHASZ)	14
Irish Albums (IRMA)	68
Italian Albums (FIMI)	18
Japanese Albums (Oricon)	98
Polish Albums (ZPAV)	21
Portuguese Albums (AFP)	46
Scottish Albums (Official Charts)	3
Spanish Albums (PROMUSICAE)	25
Swedish Albums (Sverigetopplistan)	59
Swiss Albums (Schweizer Hitparade)	1
Swiss Albums (Romandie)	1
UK Albums (Official Charts)	4
UK Independent Albums (Official Charts)	1
UK Rock & Metal Albums (Official Charts)	1
US Independent Albums (Billboard)	1
US Top Hard Rock Albums (Billboard)	1
US Top Rock Albums (Billboard)	1
US Top Album Sales (Billboard)	1
US Billboard 200	16
