= Alter Bridge (album) =

Studio album by Alter Bridge
- Released: January 9, 2026
- Recorded: 2025
- Studios: 5150 (Los Angeles); Studio Barbarosa (Orlando)
- Genres: Hard rock; progressive rock; alternative metal
- Length: 60:41
- Label: Napalm
- Producer: Michael "Elvis" Baskette

Alter Bridge chronology
Pawns & Kings (2022)	Alter Bridge (2026)

Singles from Alter Bridge
- 1. "Silent Divide" Released: September 3, 2025; 2. "What Lies Within" Released: October 8, 2025; 3. "Playing Aces" Released: December 3, 2025; 4. "Scales Are Falling" Released: January 7, 2026; 5. "Tested and Able" Released: October 6, 2026

Professional ratings
Review scores
Source	Rating
Blabbermouth.net	9/10
Classic Rock	4/5 stars
Distorted Sound Magazine	9/10
Kerrang!	4/5
Spill Magazine	4.5/5 stars

Alter Bridge is the eighth studio album by American rock band Alter Bridge. It is the follow-up to 2022's Pawns & Kings. It was released on January 9, 2026, via Napalm Records.

== Background ==
In an interview with Loudwire, guitarist Mark Tremonti explained that Alter Bridge were planning on doing something "ridiculously cool" for the eighth studio album and that it would be inspired by something "really, really special."

In another interview with frontman Myles Kennedy, he explained that the band's timeline is a little more complex this time around with his bandmates enjoying the Creed reunion. "It's just a matter of when the record will be released, given everyone's schedules", Kennedy adds, "with Alter Bridge, Slash, and his solo projects, everybody loves to work and there's still drive to create and make music and tour".

On July 15, 2025, the band announced their upcoming self-titled eighth studio album along with tour dates for 2026.

Alter Bridge was recorded at Eddie Van Halen's 5150 in Los Angeles, California. Tremonti reflects on the 'once in a lifetime opportunity' of writing and recording Alter Bridge's new album inside the studio. "It gives you the confidence like, 'We must be doing something right if we're allowed to be here on this hallowed ground of rock 'n' roll'", says Tremonti on the band's social media pages, "Every now and then, you'll look at the wall, snap out of it, and think, 'I can't believe we're here'".

According to an article from Blabbermouth.net, the album features songs that would fit well with the classic songs from their catalog. "Trust in Me" will feature Mark Tremonti taking the lead during the chorus and also in "Tested and Able" and vice versa. "Hang by a Thread" will also hint at some of Alter Bridge's previous songs, and "Slave to Master" is an epic track that Alter Bridge has come to be known for.

"Slave to Master" overtakes "Fable of the Silent Son" from their previous album Pawns & Kings (2022) as the longest studio track to date in the Alter Bridge catalog with the length being nine minutes and five seconds long.

== Track listing ==
All tracks are written by Alter Bridge.

No.	Title	Length
1.	"Silent Divide"	5:06
2.	"Rue the Day"	4:46
3.	"Power Down"	4:08
4.	"Trust in Me"	4:48
5.	"Disregarded"	3:55
6.	"Tested and Able"	4:36
7.	"What Lies Within"	5:07
8.	"Hang by a Thread"	4:11
9.	"Scales Are Falling"	5:54
10.	"Playing Aces"	4:05
11.	"What Are You Waiting For"	5:00
12.	"Slave to Master"	9:05
Total length:		60:41

== Personnel ==
Credits adapted from the album's liner notes and Tidal.

=== Alter Bridge ===
- Myles Kennedy – lead vocals, electric guitar, strings, keyboards, programming
- Mark Tremonti – electric guitar, lead vocals
- Brian Marshall – electric bass guitar
- Scott Phillips – drums

=== Additional contributors ===
- Michael "Elvis" Baskette – production, engineering, mixing, strings, keyboards, programming
- Jef Moll – engineering, digital editing
- Josh Saldate – engineering, mix engineering
- Brad Blackwood – mastering
- Daniel Tremonti – cover art
- Chuck Brueckmann – band photography, album artwork

== Charts ==
Chart performance for Alter Bridge
Chart (2026)	Peak position
Australian Albums (ARIA)	50
Austrian Albums (Ö3 Austria)	1
Belgian Albums (Ultratop Flanders)	40
Belgian Albums (Ultratop Wallonia)	34
Dutch Albums (Album Top 100)	29
French Albums (SNEP)	173
French Rock & Metal Albums (SNEP)	8
German Albums (Offizielle Top 100)	4
German Rock & Metal Albums (Offizielle Top 100)	3
Irish Independent Albums (IRMA)	12
Japanese Rock Albums (Oricon)	10
Japanese Western Albums (Oricon)	14
Japanese Download Albums (Billboard Japan)	74
Japanese Top Albums Sales (Billboard Japan)	58
Norwegian Physical Albums (IFPI Norge)	10
Polish Albums (ZPAV)	32
Portuguese Albums (AFP)	160
Scottish Albums (Official Charts)	3
Swedish Hard Rock Albums (Sverigetopplistan)	9
Swedish Physical Albums (Sverigetopplistan)	3
Swiss Albums (Schweizer Hitparade)	4
UK Albums (Official Charts)	20
UK Independent Albums (Official Charts)	4
UK Rock & Metal Albums (Official Charts)	1
US Independent Albums (Billboard)	28
US Top Album Sales (Billboard)	3
US Top Hard Rock Albums (Billboard)	15
