= Pawns & Kings =

Studio album by Alter Bridge
- Released: October 14, 2022
- Recorded: March 28 – May 17, 2022
- Studio: Studio Barbarosa (Orlando, Florida)
- Genre: Hard rock; alternative metal; progressive rock
- Length: 53:37
- Label: Napalm
- Producer: Michael Baskette

Alter Bridge chronology
Walk the Sky (2019)	Pawns & Kings (2022)	Alter Bridge (2026)

Singles from Pawns & Kings
- 1. "Pawns & Kings" Released: July 18, 2022; 2. "Silver Tongue" Released: August 1, 2022; 3. "Sin After Sin" Released: September 8, 2022; 4. "This Is War" Released: October 4, 2022; 5. "Holiday" Released: January 10, 2023

Professional ratings
Aggregate scores
Source	Rating
Metacritic	82/100
Review scores
Source	Rating
AllMusic	3.5/5 stars
Classic Rock	4.5/5 stars
Distorted Sound	4.5/5 stars
Kerrang!	4/5
Metal Digest	60%
Metal Hammer	4/5 stars
MusicOMH	4.5/5 stars
The Spill Magazine	4.5/5 stars

Pawns & Kings is the seventh studio album by American rock band Alter Bridge. It is the follow-up to 2019's Walk the Sky. It was released on October 14, 2022, via Napalm Records. It was ranked as the second best guitar album of 2022 by Guitar World readers, who also ranked the solo of the title track as the 5th best guitar solo of 2022.

== Background ==
In September 2021, guitarist Mark Tremonti revealed that he and Alter Bridge would be recording their seventh studio album during the spring of 2022, with a tentative release date some time in the fall. Tremonti and Myles Kennedy subsequently began pre-production on the album in January 2022, with recording taking place during the April with Michael "Elvis" Baskette once again as producer after producing the previous five Alter Bridge albums. During a radio interview in the May, Tremonti revealed that the album would be entitled Pawns & Kings and would be released on October 14. In a subsequent interview, he explained how Baskette felt that Tremonti and Kennedy's stylistic preferences over time had changed so much that he could not recognise which member of the band was responsible for which music.

The album was officially revealed, including its artwork and tracklist, on July 18. The cover shows a bridge with the date the band was formed on the left side of the bridge and the release date of the album on the right. The same day, the album's titular lead single, "Pawns & Kings", was released on streaming platforms with an accompanying lyric video on social media. At a length of 53 minutes and 37 seconds, Pawns & Kings is the shortest album in the band's discography to date.

== Track listing ==
All tracks are written by Alter Bridge.

Pawns & Kings track listing
No.	Title	Length
1.	"This Is War"	4:03
2.	"Dead Among the Living"	4:52
3.	"Silver Tongue"	4:18
4.	"Sin After Sin"	6:42
5.	"Stay"	4:37
6.	"Holiday"	3:58
7.	"Fable of the Silent Son"	8:22
8.	"Season of Promise"	4:51
9.	"Last Man Standing"	5:33
10.	"Pawns & Kings"	6:18
Total length:		53:37

== Personnel ==
Credits adapted from the album's liner notes.

=== Alter Bridge ===
- Myles Kennedy – vocals, guitar, strings, keyboards, programming
- Mark Tremonti – guitar, vocals, lead vocals on "Stay"
- Brian Marshall – bass
- Scott "Flip" Phillips – drums

=== Additional contributors ===
- Michael "Elvis" Baskette – production, mixing, strings, keyboards, programming
- Jef Moll – engineering, digital editing
- Josh Saldate – engineering assistance
- Brad Blackwood – mastering
- Daniel Tremonti – cover art
- Janus Music Mgmt. – band photography, album booklet art, layout

== Charts ==
Chart performance for Pawns & Kings
Chart (2022)	Peak position
Australian Albums (ARIA)	9
Austrian Albums (Ö3 Austria)	5
Belgian Albums (Ultratop Flanders)	28
Belgian Albums (Ultratop Wallonia)	66
Canadian Albums (Billboard)	84
Dutch Albums (Album Top 100)	15
French Albums (SNEP)	115
German Albums (Offizielle Top 100)	7
Italian Albums (FIMI)	50
Japanese Hot Albums (Billboard Japan)	79
Polish Albums (ZPAV)	14
Scottish Albums (OCC)	4
Spanish Albums (Promusicae)	76
Swedish Physical Albums (Sverigetopplistan)	14
Swiss Albums (Schweizer Hitparade)	2
UK Albums (OCC)	6
UK Independent Albums (OCC)	2
UK Rock & Metal Albums (OCC)	1
US Billboard 200	35
US Independent Albums (Billboard)	6
US Top Hard Rock Albums (Billboard)	2
US Top Rock Albums (Billboard)	8
